= University of Glasgow Memorial Gates =

Gates in Glasgow, Scotland

Coordinates: 55.87225°N 4.2882°W

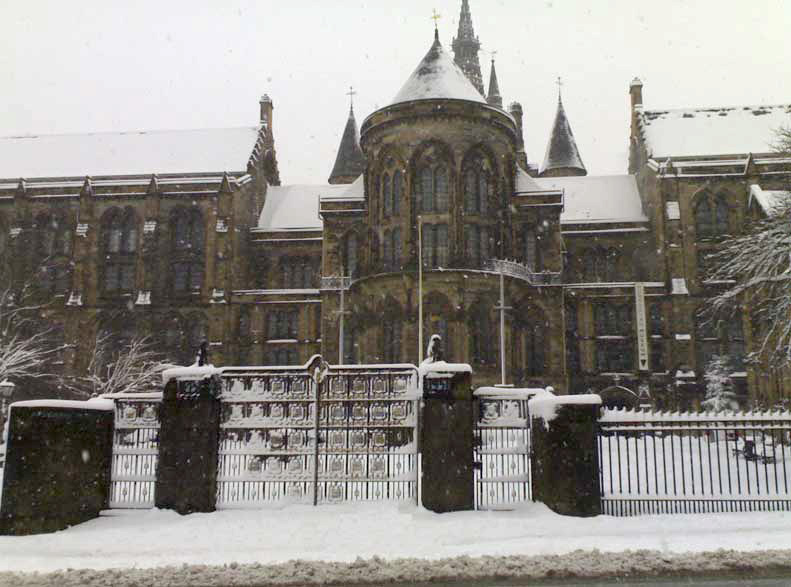
The Memorial Gates in the snow

The Memorial Gates at the University of Glasgow were erected in 1952 as a celebration of the university's quincentenary, or five hundredth anniversary. They form a portal through the University Avenue side of the perimeter fence around the university's current site on Gilmorehill. They stand before the Hunter memorial and Hunterian Museum, on the other side of the John McIntyre Building from the Main Gate. The large gates in the centre are generally locked, although the small pedestrian gates to the left and right are opened during the day. The gates bear the names of thirty distinguished figures associated with the university. The gates are protected as a category B listed building.

The university was originally situated on High Street, near the current site of the University of Strathclyde. The move to the Gilmorehill campus began in the late 19th century.

== Erection ==
The Memorial Gates were erected in 1952 to commemorate the university's quincentenary, which had been in 1951. They were presented to the university by the General Council, the body of graduates of the university, on 18 June 1952. They are attached to older gatepiers, which were erected in 1889 to designs by A G Thomson.

== Design ==
The Memorial Gates were designed by architect A Graham Henderson. The installation is formed of two large central gates, suitable for admitting vehicles, held up by large stone gateposts, with a smaller pedestrian gate on either side. The gates are set back from the main fence and connected to it by curved walls of the same stone as the gateposts. The central gates bear the names of thirty distinguished figures associated with the university (originally twenty-eight with two names added later), with a figure of the University Mace running between the two gates. The gateposts are topped by a lion and unicorn, and the dates 1451 and 1951, on the right and left respectively, while the two pedestrian gates have two each of the heraldic emblems of the university's former nations at their top. The curved wall on one side bears the university's motto, Via, Veritas, Vita, while the other bears the inscription, Almae Matri Alumni Pietatis Causa, indicating the gates represent the devotion of the alumni to their alma mater.

== Names ==
The Memorial Gates bear the names of the following people connected with the university:

Bute	Macewen	Caird	Kelvin	Lister	Bradley	Lushington	Elder
Hunter	Cullen	Millar	Watt	Adam Smith	Campbell	Reid	Foulis
	Gillespie	Stair	Maxwell	Baillie	Montrose	Burnet
	Dewar	Morton	Boyd	Melville	Hamilton	Smith
			James II	Turnbull

- Bute: John Crichton-Stuart, 3rd Marquess of Bute, a benefactor of the university after whom the Bute Hall is named
- Hunter: William Hunter, physician who bequeathed to the university what became the Hunterian Museum
- Macewan: Sir William Macewen, surgeon (Regius Professor of Surgery from 1892 to 1924)
- Cullen: William Cullen, physician (Regius Professor of Practice of Medicine from 1751 to 1755)
- Gillespie: Patrick Gillespie, Covenanter (Principal from 1653 to 1660)
- Dewar: Donald Dewar, First Minister of Scotland*
- Caird: John Caird, theologian (Principal from 1873 to 1898)
- Millar: John Millar, philosopher (Regius Professor of Law from 1761 to 1800)
- Stair: James Dalrymple, 1st Viscount of Stair, jurist, Lord President of the Court of Session
- Morton: James Douglas, 4th Earl of Morton, Regent of Scotland, political benefactor
- Kelvin: William Thomson, 1st Baron Kelvin, physicist (Chancellor from 1904 to 1908)
- Watt: James Watt, inventor of the steam engine
- Maxwell: Sir John Maxwell of Nether Pollok, Lord Justice Clerk (Rector from 1691 to 1718)
- Boyd: Zachary Boyd, benefactor
- James II, King of Scotland when the university was founded
- Lister: Joseph Lister, 1st Baron Lister, pioneer of sterile surgery (Professor of Surgery from 1860 to 1869)
- Adam Smith, father of modern economics, author of The Wealth of Nations (Professor of Moral Philosophy from 1752 to 1764 and Rector from 1787 to 1789)
- Baillie: Robert Baillie, Covenanter (Principal from 1660 to 1662)
- Melville: Andrew Melville, Protestant reformer (Principal from 1574 to 1580)
- Turnbull: William Turnbull, Bishop of Glasgow, founder of the university
- Bradley: A. C. Bradley, literary critic (Regius Professor of English Language and Literature from 1889 to 1900)
- Campbell: Thomas Campbell, poet (Rector from 1826 to 1829)
- Montrose: James Graham, 1st Duke of Montrose, benefactor (Chancellor from 1714 until 1742)
- Hamilton: James Hamilton, 1st Lord Hamilton, benefactor, Sheriff of Lanarkshire
- Lushington: Edmund Law Lushington, classical scholar (Professor of Greek from 1838 to 1875, Rector from 1884 to 1887)
- Reid: Thomas Reid, philosopher (Professor of Moral Philosophy from 1764 to 1781)
- Burnet: Gilbert Burnet, historian (Professor of Divinity from 1669 to 1674)
- Smith: John Smith, politician, leader of the Labour Party*
- Elder: Isabella Elder, benefactor of women's education, provided North Park House as the home for Queen Margaret College
- Foulis: Robert Foulis, Printer to the university, founder of former Academy of Fine Arts

*During the university's 550th anniversary celebrations in 2001, the names of Donald Dewar and John Smith were installed on the Memorial Gates to mark their contribution to Scottish politics in the late 20th century.
