= Professor of Divinity =

Professor of Divinity may refer to academics in the field of theology (see divinity) and in particular to chairs in the UK as in the following:

- Ely Professor of Divinity, Cambridge
- Professor of Divinity, Glasgow
- Professor of Divinity and Biblical Criticism, Glasgow
- Gresham Professor of Divinity, Gresham College, London
- Lady Margaret's Professor of Divinity, Cambridge
- Lady Margaret Professor (Oxford)
- Lightfoot Professor of Divinity, Durham
- Norris-Hulse Professor of Divinity, Cambridge
- Regius Professor of Divinity, Cambridge and Oxford
- Van Mildert Professor of Divinity, Durham
