= Thomas Turnbull =

Thomas Turnbull may refer to:

- Thomas Turnbull (architect), New Zealand architect
- Thomas Turnbull (moderator), Scottish minister, moderator of the General Assembly of the Church of Scotland
- Thomas Scott Turnbull, English businessman and mayor of Sunderland
