= Professor of Divinity (Glasgow) =

Academic position at the University of Glasgow

Professor of Divinity is an academic position at the University of Glasgow.

Although divinity was taught from the foundations of the university in 1451, it was in 1577, as part of James VI's Nova Erectio, that a chair was established, to be held by the principal of the University of Glasgow. The last principal to hold the chair of divinity was Herbert Story, from 1898 to 1907.

In 1640, a second chair of divinity was established, with the holder considered the professor of divinity.

Note, there is also a professor of Divinity and Biblical Criticism.

== Professors of Divinity ==
- David Dickson MA (1640)
- Robert Baillie MA (1642)
- John Young MA (1653)
- Gilbert Burnet MA (1669)
- David Liddell MA (1674)
- Alexander Ross MA (1682)
- James Wemyss DD (1688)
- James Wodrow MA (1692)
- Alexander Wodrow MA (1705)
- John Simson MA (1708)
- Michael Potter MA (1740)
- William Leechman MA DD (1744)
- Robert Trail MA DD (1761)
- James Baillie MA DD (1775)
- William Wight MA DD (1778)
- Robert Findlay MA DD (1782)
- Stevenson Macgill MA DD (1814)
- Alexander Hill MA DD (1840)
- John Caird MA LLD DD (1862)
- William Purdie Dickson MA LLD DD (1873)
- William Hastie MA DD (1895)
- Henry Martyn Beckwith Reid MA DD (1903)
- William Fulton MA BSc LLD DD (1927)
- John Gervase Riddell MA DD (1947)
- Ronald Gregor Smith MA ThD DD (1956)
- Allan Douglas Galloway MA BD PhD STM (1969)
- George McLeod Newlands MA BD PhD DLitt (1986–2008)
- Werner Jeanrond MA PhD (2008–2012)
- George Pattison MA BD PhD DD (2013–2023)
- Garrick Allen PhD (2023–present)

== See also ==
- List of Professorships at the University of Glasgow
