= Patrick Sharp (disambiguation) =

Patrick Sharp (born 1981) is a Canadian ice hockey player.

Patrick Sharp may also refer to:

- Patrick Sharp (theologian) (died 1615), Scottish theologian
- Pat Sharp (born 1961), British radio and television presenter
