= John Adamson =

John Adamson may refer to:

- John Adamson (antiquary) (1787–1855), English antiquary
- John Adamson (Queensland politician) (1857–1922), member of the Parliament of Queensland
- John Adamson (minister) (1742–1808), Moderator of the General Assembly of the Church of Scotland
- John Adamson (New South Wales politician) (1910–1984), member of the New South Wales Legislative Assembly
- John Adamson (physician) (1809–1870), Scottish doctor, physicist and museum curator
- John Adamson (publisher) (born 1949), British publisher
- John Adamson (university principal) (1576–1653), principal of the University of Edinburgh, 1623–1652
