= Marion Fraser =

Scottish music educator (1932–2016)

Lady Marion Fraser LT
- Born: Marion Anne Forbes; 17 October 1932; Glasgow, Lanarkshire, Scotland
- Died: 25 December 2016 (aged 84); Haddington, East Lothian, Scotland
- Education: Hutchesons' Grammar School; Royal Scottish Academy of Music and Drama; University of Glasgow (MA, 1954)
- Occupations: Musician, educator
- Spouse: Sir William Kerr Fraser (m. 1956)
- Children: 4

Lady Marion Anne Fraser LT (née Forbes; 17 October 1932 – 25 December 2016) was a Scottish music educator.

== Personal life ==
Fraser was the daughter of Elizabeth Taylor Watt and Robert Forbes. She attended school in Glasgow at Hutchesons' Girls' Grammar School, going on to the University of Glasgow in 1950, to study for an MA. While a student at the university, she was elected president of the Queen Margaret Union. She then attended the Royal Scottish Academy of Music and Drama where she studied piano.

In 1956, she married William Kerr Fraser, a former president of the Glasgow University Students' Representative Council and at the time a junior civil servant at the Scottish Office. He went on to become permanent secretary there, and later principal and then Chancellor of the University of Glasgow. The couple had three sons and one daughter.

== Career ==
Fraser worked as a music teacher and became director of St Mary's Music School in Edinburgh from 1989 to 1995, as well as being founding chair of the Friends of the Royal Scottish Academy from 1986 to 1989, a governor of the former Laurel Bank School for Girls from 1988 to 1995 and a Director of Scottish Opera from 1990 to 1994. In 1996, shortly after stepping down as Director of St. Mary's, she was created a Lady of the Order of the Thistle. Her husband had been created a Knight Commander of the Order of the Bath in 1979 (and subsequently elevated within the order to Knight Grand Cross), entitling her to be addressed as Lady Fraser; however, she now became Lady Marion Fraser in her own right.

Fraser had been a trustee of the Scottish Churches Architectural Heritage Trust since 1989, and President of Scotland's Churches Scheme since 1997. She was trustee of the Lamp of Lothian Collegiate Trust from 1996 to 2005, and chairman of the Board of Christian Aid from 1990 to 1997, and of both the Scottish International Piano Competition and the Scottish Association for Mental Health from 1995 to 1999. She served as Lord High Commissioner to the General Assembly of the Church of Scotland from 1994 to 1995.

Fraser was made an Honorary Member of the Company of Merchants of the City of Edinburgh in 1998 and an Honorary Fellow of the Royal College of Physicians and Surgeons of Glasgow in 2002, and was awarded an honorary LL.D. degree by the University of Glasgow in 1995 and an honorary D.Univ. degree by the University of Stirling in 1998.

She died at St Columba's Hospice, Edinburgh, on 25 December 2016.

== Arms ==
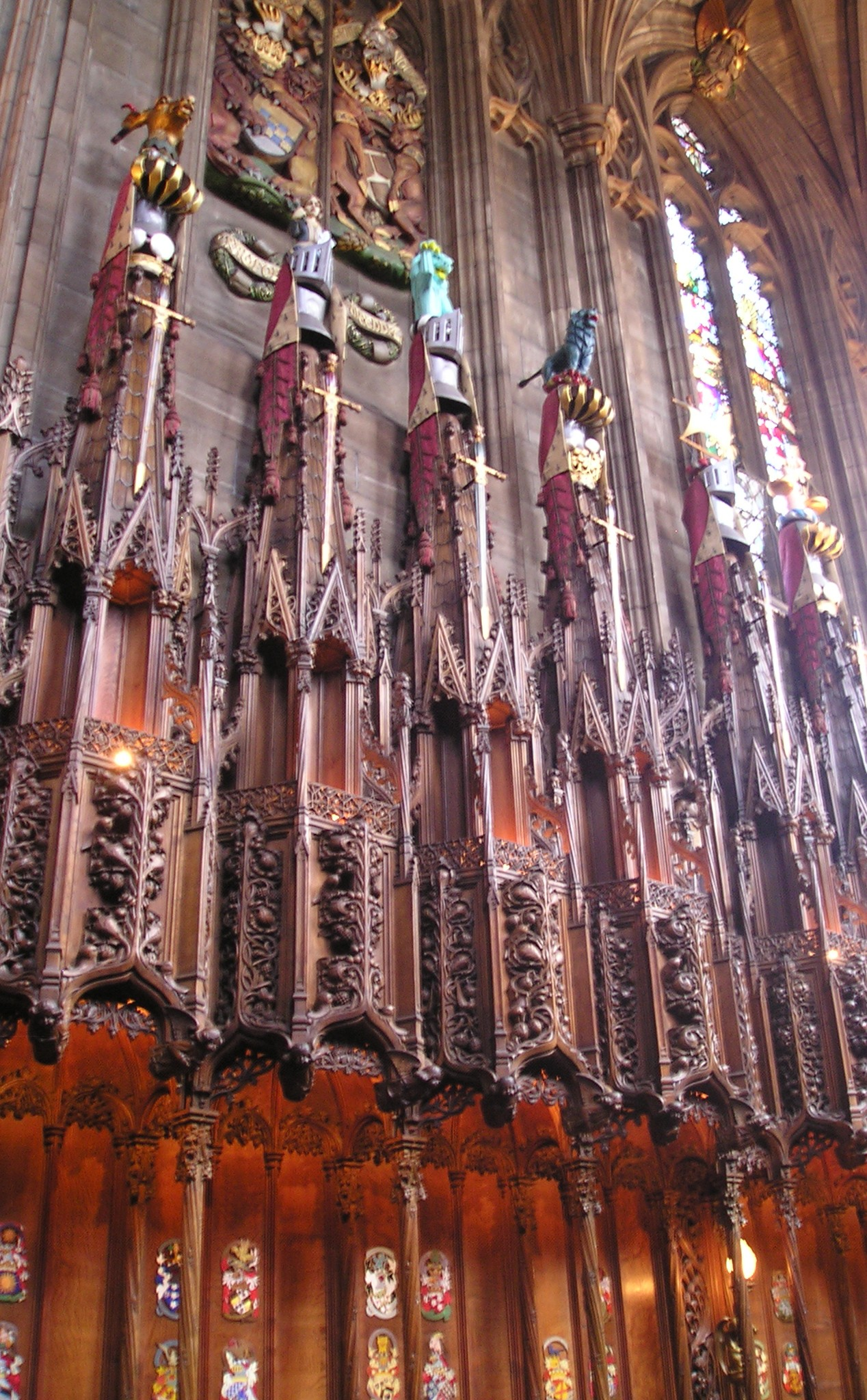
Lady Marion's helm and crest above her stall in St. Giles' Cathedral.

Coat of arms of Marion Fraser
| Crest A demi-female richly attired holding in her dexter hand at the shoulder a thistle slipped and leaved all Proper and in her sinister hand at the hip a fraise Argent. Escutcheon Azure three fraises in pale Argent between two bears' heads couped and respectant of the last muzzled Gules. |
