= An Introduction to the Philosophy of Religion =

1880 book by John Caird

- Author: John Caird
- Language: English
- Subject: Philosophy of religion
- Published: 1880
- Publication place: United Kingdom
- Media type: Print
- ISBN: 978-1230340180

An Introduction to the Philosophy of Religion is an 1880 book by the theologian John Caird.

== Influence ==
The philosopher Mark D. Jordan stated that An Introduction to the Philosophy of Religion helped popularized the term "philosophy of religion" in English.
