= Alwyn Williams (geologist) =

Welsh geologist (1921–2004)

Sir Alwyn Williams FRS FRSE MRIA FGS

Principal of the University of Glasgow
- In office 1976–1988
- Preceded by: Sir Charles Wilson
- Succeeded by: Sir William Kerr Fraser

Personal details
- Born: 8 June 1921 Aberdare, Wales
- Died: 4 April 2004 (aged 82)
- Spouse: Joan Bevan
- Education: University College of Wales
- Profession: Geologist

Sir Alwyn Williams FRS FRSE MRIA FGS (8 June 1921 – 4 April 2004) was a Welsh geologist, who was Principal of the University of Glasgow from 1976 to 1988, and President of the Royal Society of Edinburgh from 1985 to 1988.

== Early life ==
Williams was born in Aberdare, an industrial town in Rhondda Cynon Taf, South Wales, and attended Aberdare Boys' Grammar School. He was a keen sportsman in his youth, taking part in athletics and rugby, and had ambitions to join the Fleet Air Arm of the Royal Navy, although these were thwarted by a bout of tuberculosis in 1939, which confined him for a time to a sanitorium. He instead won a scholarship to study at University College of Wales, Aberystwyth, where he achieved a First in geology in 1939, and a PhD, studying Welsh Ordovician rocks and describing new species of brachiopods. Whilst at Aberystwyth he served both as President of the institution's Students' Representative Council, and as National Vice-President of the National Union of Students. In 1948, he was appointed Lecturer in Geology at the University of Glasgow, but postponed this position to complete a two-year Harkness Fellowship at the Smithsonian Institution, Washington, D.C., working under leading brachiopod expert G. Arthur Cooper.

== Academic career ==
Williams took up his post as Lecturer in Geology at the University of Glasgow in 1950, but remained only four years, moving in 1954 to the Chair in Geology at Queen's University Belfast. Whilst at Belfast, he served as Dean of Science and as Secretary to the Academic Council, and from 1967 as Pro-Vice-Principal. He left Belfast in 1974 to succeed Fred Shotton as Lapworth Professor of Geology and Head of Department at the University of Birmingham, and two years later returned to Glasgow as Principal of the University.

=== Research ===
Whilst at Belfast, Williams began focussing his research on brachiopods, introducing new techniques to study of the species, particularly transmission and scanning electron microscopy. At this time he also began work on the brachiopod volumes of the Treatise on Invertebrate Paleontology, and at the 1990 International Brachiopod Congress, he agreed to co-ordinate a complete revision of these volumes. Whilst Principal at Glasgow, he began expanding his research into the interrelationships between the soft tissues and hard shells of brachiopods in the new Palaeobiology Unit.

=== University of Glasgow ===
Williams was appointed Principal of the University of Glasgow in 1976, succeeding Sir Charles Wilson. He introduced new teaching practices to the University, using modern technology, and established what is now one of the leading departments of Computing Science in the UK, and is credited with improving the research rigour of the institution. Despite his heavy load of administrative duties as Principal, Williams continued his research, publishing twenty refereed papers and holding three NERC grants. He was knighted in 1983. Upon retiring as Principal in 1988, he created a Palaeobiology Unit to support his own continued research.

=== Royal Society of Edinburgh ===
Sir Alwyn became President of the Royal Society of Edinburgh in 1985, serving until 1988. Although his tenure lasted only three years, it included the purchase of the Society's landmark premises in George Street and the fostering of links with the Royal Society in London and the Royal Irish Academy, Williams also holding membership of both organisations. His leadership helped the RSE to develop its position and role as one of the leading academies of the British Isles.

== Sir Alwyn Williams Building ==
Sir Alwyn Williams Building

General information
- Construction started: 2005
- Completed: 2007
- Cost: £4M

Technical details
- Floor count: 5

Design and construction
- Architecture firm: Reiach and Hall

The Sir Alwyn Williams Building at the University of Glasgow was opened on 22 June 2007 by Professor Anne Glover, Chief Scientific Adviser for Scotland, and Williams's widow, Joan. It was an extension to the facilities of the Department of Computing Science, located between the Department's pre-existing accommodation, in a row of interconnected Victorian townhouses on Lilybank Gardens, and the 1968-built Queen Margaret Union building. The Building contains offices and laboratories as well as informal "break-out spaces".

The architectural style is strikingly modern, and building work also included construction of a pedestrianised plaza between University Gardens and Lilybank Gardens, connecting to the North doors of the Boyd Orr Building. Construction lasted between 2005 and 2007, and cost £4M. The building was designed by Reiach and Hall Architects, who also built the University's Wolfson Medical School Building. In 2008, the building was briefly occupied by students protesting against violence in the Gaza Strip.

== Personal life ==
Williams married Joan Bevan in 1949, with whom he had a son and a daughter, Professor Gareth Williams and Dr Sian Shepherd. The pair met while studying in Aberystwyth and married in Canada. The family lived in Pollokshields in the South of Glasgow. As well as his academic and administrative posts, Williams had a keen interest in the arts, and was chairman of the Committee on National Museums and Galleries in Scotland between 1979 and 1981. During this time he conducted a report on the National Museum of Antiquities, which led to the establishment of the Museum of Scotland.

Academic offices
| Preceded by Fred Shotton | Lapworth Professor of Geology, University of Birmingham; 1974–1976 | Succeeded by Anthony Hallam |
| Preceded by Sir Charles Wilson | Principal and Vice-Chancellor of the University of Glasgow; 1976–1988 | Succeeded by Sir William Kerr Fraser |
