= Charles Wilson (political scientist) =

Scottish political scientist (1909–2002)

Sir Charles Wilson

Principal of the University of Glasgow
- In office 1961–1976
- Preceded by: Sir Hector Hetherington
- Succeeded by: Sir Alwyn Williams

Vice-Chancellor of the University of Leicester (Principal of University College Leicester, 1952 - 1957)
- In office 1957–1961

Personal details
- Born: 16 May 1909 Partick, Glasgow
- Died: 1 November 2002 (aged 93)
- Spouse: Jessie Wilson
- Education: University of Glasgow

Sir Charles Haynes Wilson (16 May 1909 – 1 November 2002) was a Scottish political scientist and university administrator. As Principal of University College Leicester, he led the institution to university status in 1957 and served as the first Vice-Chancellor of the new University of Leicester, before becoming Principal of the University of Glasgow in 1961.

Buildings at both universities have been named in his honour.

== Life ==
Wilson was born in Partick, Glasgow, the son of George Wilson and his wife, Florence Margaret Hannay.

He attended Hillhead High School. He then studied languages and philosophy at the University of Glasgow, graduating MA with double first-class honours in 1932 and holding the university's Faulds Fellowship for two years, studying political philosophy.

In 1934, Wilson began lecturing in political science at the London School of Economics, and in 1939 was appointed Fellow and Tutor in Modern History and Politics at Corpus Christi College, Oxford, becoming Junior Proctor in 1945. In 1950, he was visiting professor of comparative government at Ohio State University. In 1952, he was appointed principal of University College Leicester, becoming the institution's vice-chancellor when it was accorded full university status in 1957. He was also involved in the establishment and upgrading of the universities of Sussex, East Anglia and Strathclyde.

In 1961, he succeeded Sir Hector Hetherington as Principal of the University of Glasgow. Professor Hetherington had begun a programme of expansion at the university, which Wilson continued. As well as the establishment of fifty new Chairs, Wilson presided over construction of the Rankine Engineering Building, Queen Margaret Union, Refectory (now the Fraser Building), Adam Smith Building, Boyd Orr Building and Mathematics Building, although the Library, Geology Building and Hunterian Art Gallery remained under construction at the time of his retirement due to financial and planning issues. All of these buildings had modern designs which diverge distinctly from the character of other parts of the university. He was chairman from 1964 to 1967 of the Committee of Vice-Chancellors and Principals, and twice chairman of the Association of Commonwealth Universities.

He was knighted by Queen Elizabeth II in 1965.

Wilson received an honorary doctorate from Heriot-Watt University in 1977.

He retired in 1976, and died on 9 November 2002.

== Charles Wilson Building, Leicester ==
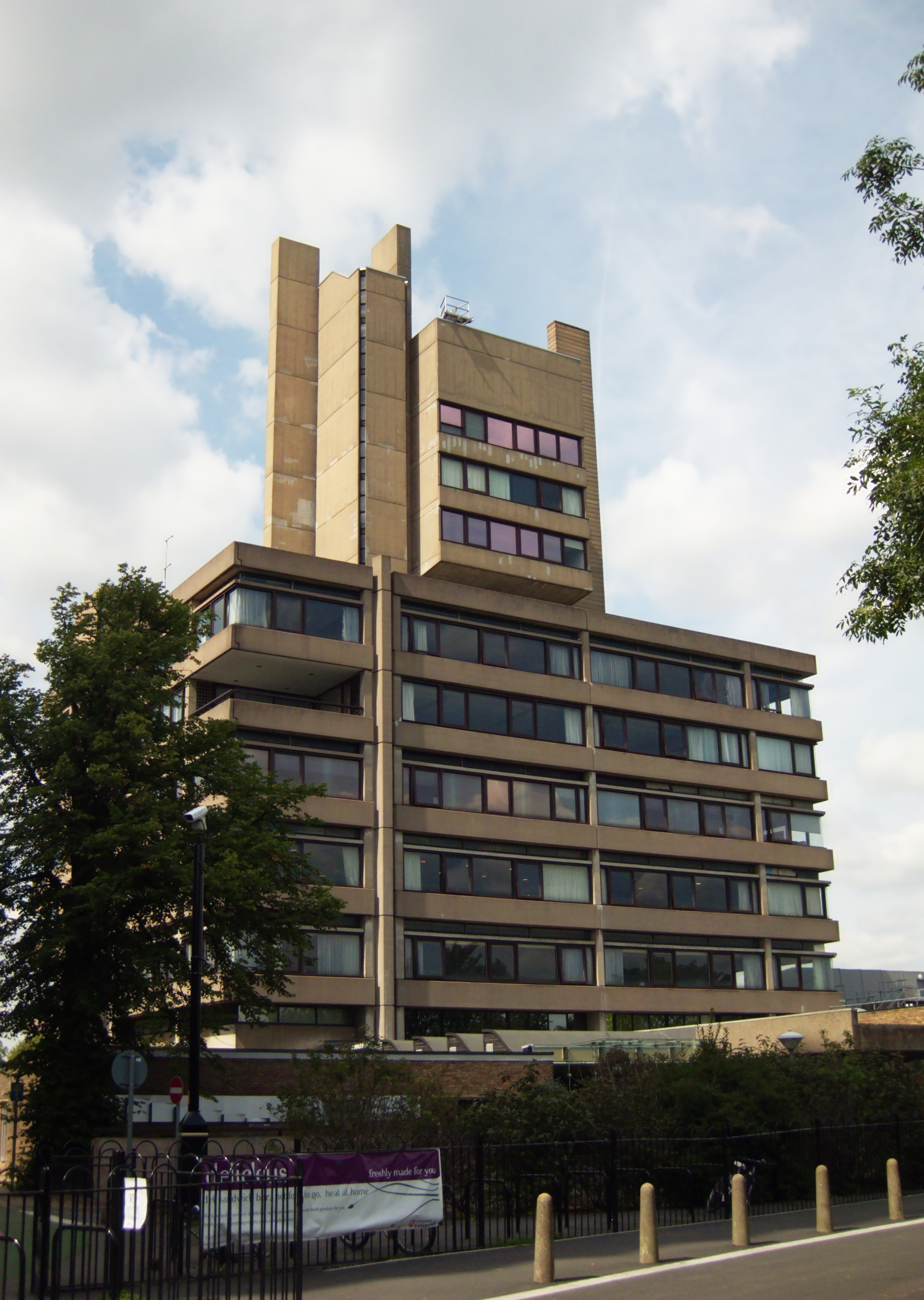
Charles Wilson Building, University of Leicester

The Charles Wilson Building at the University of Leicester was designed by Sir Denys Lasdun in the brutalist style, and completed in 1963. It is Category B listed. It is the university's main social and catering building, and is licensed as a venue for civil weddings and civil partnerships.

== Sir Charles Wilson Building, Glasgow ==
The Sir Charles Wilson Building at the University of Glasgow sits at the foot of University Avenue, opposite the Glasgow University Union and close to the Gilmorehill Centre. It is a converted church now containing a lecture theatre and seminar rooms, and is a Category C listed building.

Originally built as the Hillhead Congregational Church, and opened in 1889, it was designed by Hugh and David Barclay, whose other works included nearby schools Hillhead High School and Glasgow Academy. The building was acquired by the university in 2004 when work began to convert it into a conference and lecture facility. The building opened in 2005 containing a raked auditorium seating three hundred and an eighty-person seminar room with a sliding partition. The design retains a number of the building's period features, such as stained glass windows, arched ceiling and polished granite columns, while introducing contemporary furnishings and comprehensive audio-visual equipment, as well as full disabled access.

== Personal life ==
Wilson married Jessie Gilmour in 1935, with whom he had a son and two daughters. He died on 9 November 2002.

Academic offices
Preceded by new establishment	Vice-Chancellor of the University of Leicester; 1957–1961	Succeeded by Fraser Noble
Preceded by Professor Sir Hector Hetherington	Principal and Vice-Chancellor of the University of Glasgow; 1961–1976	Succeeded by Professor Sir Alwyn Williams
