= Graeme Davies =

New Zealand engineer, academic and administrator (1937–2022)

Sir Graeme Davies
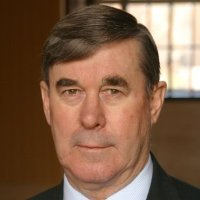
- Born: 7 April 1937; Auckland, New Zealand
- Died: 30 August 2022 (aged 85); Farndon, Nottinghamshire, England
- Education: University of Auckland; St Catharine's College, Cambridge
- Known for: his pioneering work merging the polytechnic and university sectors in the United Kingdom and establishing the Higher Education Funding Council for England, and for his leadership of the leading universities of Liverpool, Glasgow and London.
- Scientific career
- Fields: Materials engineering, Metallurgy
- Workplaces: University of Cambridge, University of Sheffield, University of Liverpool, University of Glasgow, University of London

Sir Graeme John Davies FRSNZ (7 April 1937 – 30 August 2022) was a New Zealand engineer, academic and administrator. During his career, he was Vice-Chancellor of three universities: the University of Liverpool, the University of Glasgow and the University of London.

== Early life and education ==
Graeme John Davies was born in Auckland, New Zealand on 7 April 1937, the son of Harry John Davies and Gladys Edna Davies (née Pratt). He attended Mount Albert Grammar School in Auckland, and later the University of Auckland where he obtained a BE in Aeronautical Engineering and a PhD in Materials Science. His doctoral thesis was entitled The work-hardening behaviour of polycrystalline copper during interrupted tensile testing.

== Career ==
Davies taught metallurgy at the University of Auckland (1960–1962), the University of Cambridge (1964–1977) and the University of Sheffield (1978–1986) where he was Professor of Metallurgy.

He moved in 1962 to the Department of Materials Science and Metallurgy, University of Cambridge, initially as a TI Research Fellow. He was made a Demonstrator in 1964 and a Lecturer in 1966. Some details of his time in the Department are provided in a book covering its history. He also became a Fellow of St Catharine's College, Cambridge, serving as Dean and as a Tutor.

Davies became Chief Executive of the Universities Funding Council (UFC), and also of the Polytechnic and Colleges Funding Council (PCFC), and then of their successor, the Higher Education Funding Council for England (HEFCE). He was also a Fellow of the Royal Academy of Engineering and a Fellow of the Royal Society of Edinburgh and an Honorary Fellow of the Royal Society of New Zealand, the Royal Veterinary College, the UCL School of Pharmacy, Trinity Laban Conservatoire of Music and Dance, St George's, University of London, the Royal College of Physicians and Surgeons of Glasgow and the Chartered Institute of Procurement & Supply. He was awarded Honorary Doctorates by thirteen universities.

He became an Honorary Fellow of St Catharine's College, Cambridge in 1989. Davies also served as the Chairman of Universities Superannuation Scheme (USS), Ltd. He also held roles including Emeritus Vice Chancellor of the University of London; Chairman of the British University Vietnam, the Foundation for Liver Research, Governor of the University of Lincoln, of Taylor's University, of the British Institute of Technology and E-commerce, and Trustee of Regent's University London.

Davies was Member of the Council of the Worshipful Company of Ironmongers, and was Master from 2005 to 2006. He was also the Chairman of the NZ-UK Link Foundation and the Council for the Central Laboratory of the Research Councils, and a Governor of the University of Hertfordshire, of the University of Seychelles, and of Shrewsbury School. For five years he served as a Member of the Public Interest Body of Pricewaterhouse Coopers.

== Later life and death ==
Davies was knighted in 1996 New Year Honours for services to the Higher Education Funding Council for England. He died from cancer at his home in Farndon, Nottinghamshire, on 30 August 2022, at the age of 85.

== Publications ==
- Solidification and Casting (1973)
- Texture and the Properties of Materials (co-ed, 1976)
- Solidificacao e Fundicao das Metals e Suas Ligas (jtly, 1978)
- Hot Working and Forming Processes (co-ed, 1980)
- Superplasticity (jtly, 1981)
- Essential Metallurgy for Engineers (jtly, 1985)
- Herding Cats (jtly, 2010)

== See also ==
- List of Vice-Chancellors of the University of London

Academic offices
Preceded by Professor Robert Whelan	Vice-Chancellor of the University of Liverpool; 1986–1991	Succeeded by Professor Philip Love
Preceded by Sir William Kerr Fraser	Principal and Vice-Chancellor of the University of Glasgow; 1995–2003	Succeeded by Sir Muir Russell
Preceded by Professor Graham J Zellick CBE	Vice-Chancellor of the University of London; 2003–2010	Succeeded by Professor Geoffrey Crossick
