= John Stirling (principal) =

Minister and education administrator

John Stirling (1654–1727) was a minister of the Church of Scotland in the 17th/18th centuries who served as Principal of Glasgow University from 1701 to 1727 and in 1707 attained the highest post in the Scottish church as Moderator of the General Assembly.

== Life ==
He was born in 1654 (baptised on 18 August) in the manse at Kilbarchan the son of Rev John Stirling and his wife Jean Maxwell.

He was educated at the University of Glasgow. He was licensed to preach as a Church of Scotland minister by the Presbytery of Glasgow in February 1690. He was ordained as minister of Inchinnan in May 1691. He translated to Greenock in September 1694.

On 8 May 1701 he was elected Principal of the University of Glasgow in place of William Dunlop and began the role on 18 September. During his principalship he created seven new chairs, reorganised the Faculty of Arts and enlarged the Faculty of Divinity. He created the two new faculties of Law and Medicine to better parallel the subjects offered by other Scottish universities.

In 1707 he was additionally elected Moderator of the General Assembly of the Church of Scotland in succession to William Wishart.

He died on 29 September 1727.

== Family ==
He married Elizabeth Stewart (d. 1738).
