= Thomas Smeton =

Scottish minister

Thomas Smeton, Smeaton or Smieton (1536–1583) was a Scottish minister and Principal of Glasgow University.

== Life ==
He was born at Gask, near Perth, was educated at the school at Perth, and in 1553 incorporated a student in St. Salvator's College, St. Andrews. A promising scholar, he was made a regent of the college, and remained there until the reformers gained the ascendency. He was then ejected, and went to Paris. There he associated with many of the reformers, and enjoyed the friendship of Andrew Melville. Still a Catholic, he entered the Company of Jesus as a probationer, and proceeded to their college at Rome, visiting Geneva on his way. After continuing in Rome about a year and a half, he found himself suspect in Rome as a favourer of Protestant doctrine. He left for Paris, and shortly after proceeded to Clermont, in both places lecturing on the humanities. In Paris in 1571, Thomas Maitland, a younger brother of William Maitland of Lethington, persuaded Smeton to accompany him to Italy. Maitland died there, and Smeton went on to Geneva, where he conversed with the reformers, and finally decided to leave the Roman Catholic church. He was in Paris during the massacre of St. Bartholomew, taking refuge with Francis Walsingham, the English ambassador. On arriving in England he publicly renounced Catholicism, and settled in Colchester as a schoolmaster.

In 1577 he returned to Scotland, and was appointed minister of Paisley Abbey and dean of faculty to Glasgow University. He soon took a prominent part in church matters. In October 1578 he was nominated one of the assessors to the moderator in the general assembly, and in the following year was himself chosen moderator. On 3 January 1580 James VI appointed him principal of Glasgow University, in succession to Andrew Melville. In April 1583 he was again chosen moderator of the general assembly. At this time Andrew Melville was anxious that Smeton should succeed him at the University of St. Andrews, but the king, instigated by the prior of St. Andrews, who was opposed to the appointment, forbade his nomination, on the grounds of the loss it would inflict on the university of Glasgow. On his return to Glasgow Smeton was seized with a high fever, and died on 13 December 1583. He married before 1575, and had a son Thomas.

== Works ==
Smeton was author of Ad Virulentum Archibaldi Hamiltonii Apostatae Dialogum, de Confusione Calvinianae Sectae apud Scotos, impie conscriptum. Orthodoxa Responsio, Edinburgh, 1579; a reply to Archibald Hamilton. With this work was a life of John Knox, Eximii viri Joannis Knoxii, Scoticanae Ecclesiae Instauratori, vera Extreme Vitae Obitus Historia. Thomas Dempster also attributes to Smeton Epitaphium Metellani.

Academic offices
Preceded by Andrew Melville	Principal of the University of Glasgow; 1580–1583	Succeeded by Patrick Sharp
