= Edward Wright (principal) =

Edward Wright of Kersie (c.1605–1683) was a minister of the Church of Scotland who served as Principal of the University of Glasgow from 1662 to 1683.

== Life ==
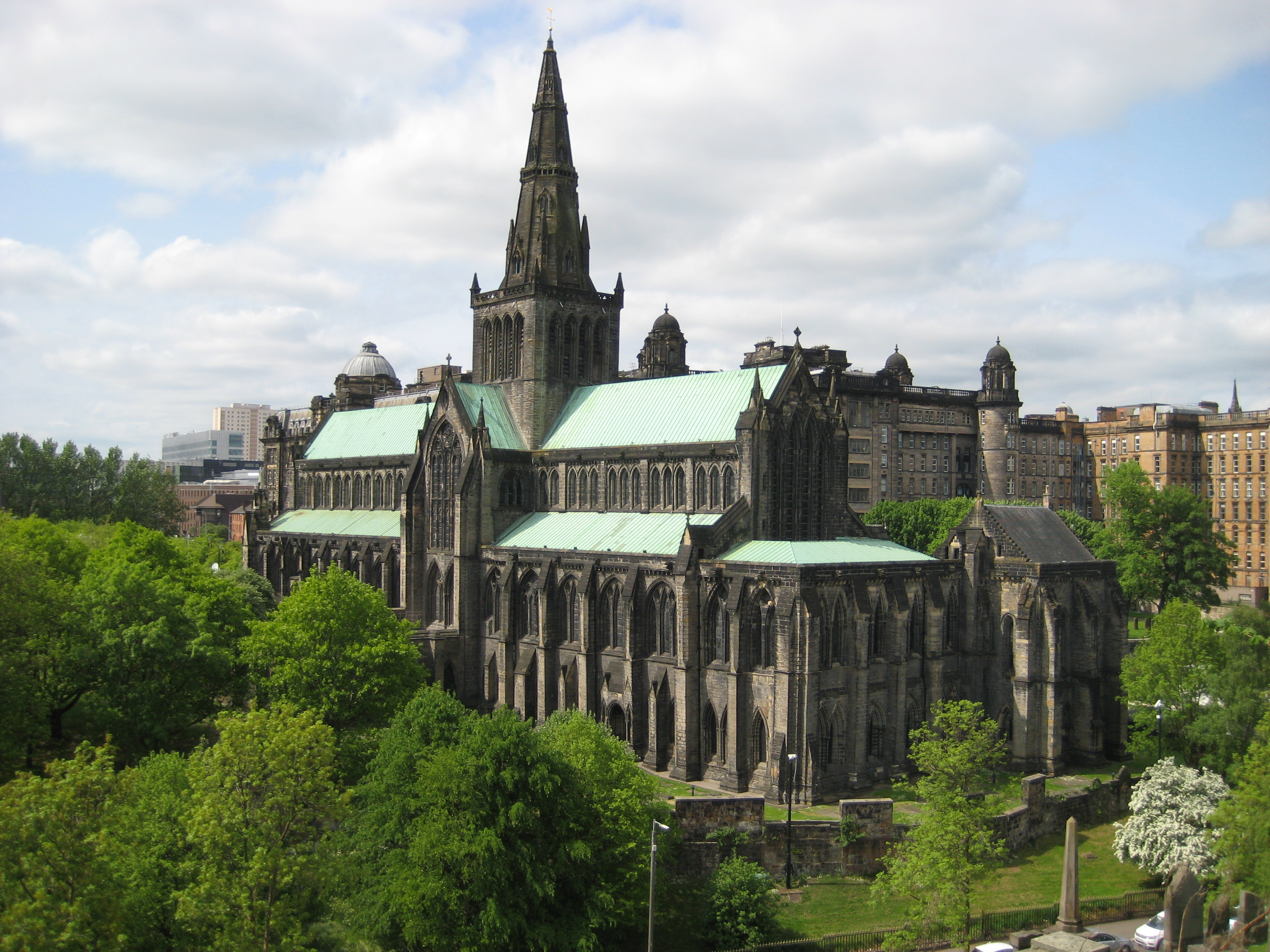
The High Kirk of Glasgow (Glasgow Cathedral)

He was born around 1605 the son of William Wright, probably at Kersie Mains, a property on the River Forth near Falkirk. His father was a merchant either in Falkirk and/or Edinburgh.

Edward was educated at the University of Edinburgh, graduating with an MA in June 1620. Joining the Church of Scotland he was ordained as minister of Clackmannan in September 1666. He translated to the High Kirk of Glasgow in April 1641. In August 1641 he was elected Professor of Divinity at the University of Aberdeen but the General Assembly refused him permission to move and required him to stay in Glasgow. In November 1646 he deliberately moved to the less onerous position as minister of Falkirk.

In December 1662 he replaced Robert Baillie as Principal of the University of Glasgow. He died in 1683. His position as Principal was filled by Rev James Fall.

Kersie Mains was owned by a John Wright in 1707 but passed to the Earl of Dunmore around 1745. The house still stands. It was made a listed building in 1972.

== Family ==
He married Margaret Brown and had two sons.
