= William Purdie Dickson =

Scottish minister and theologian

Professor William Purdie Dickson
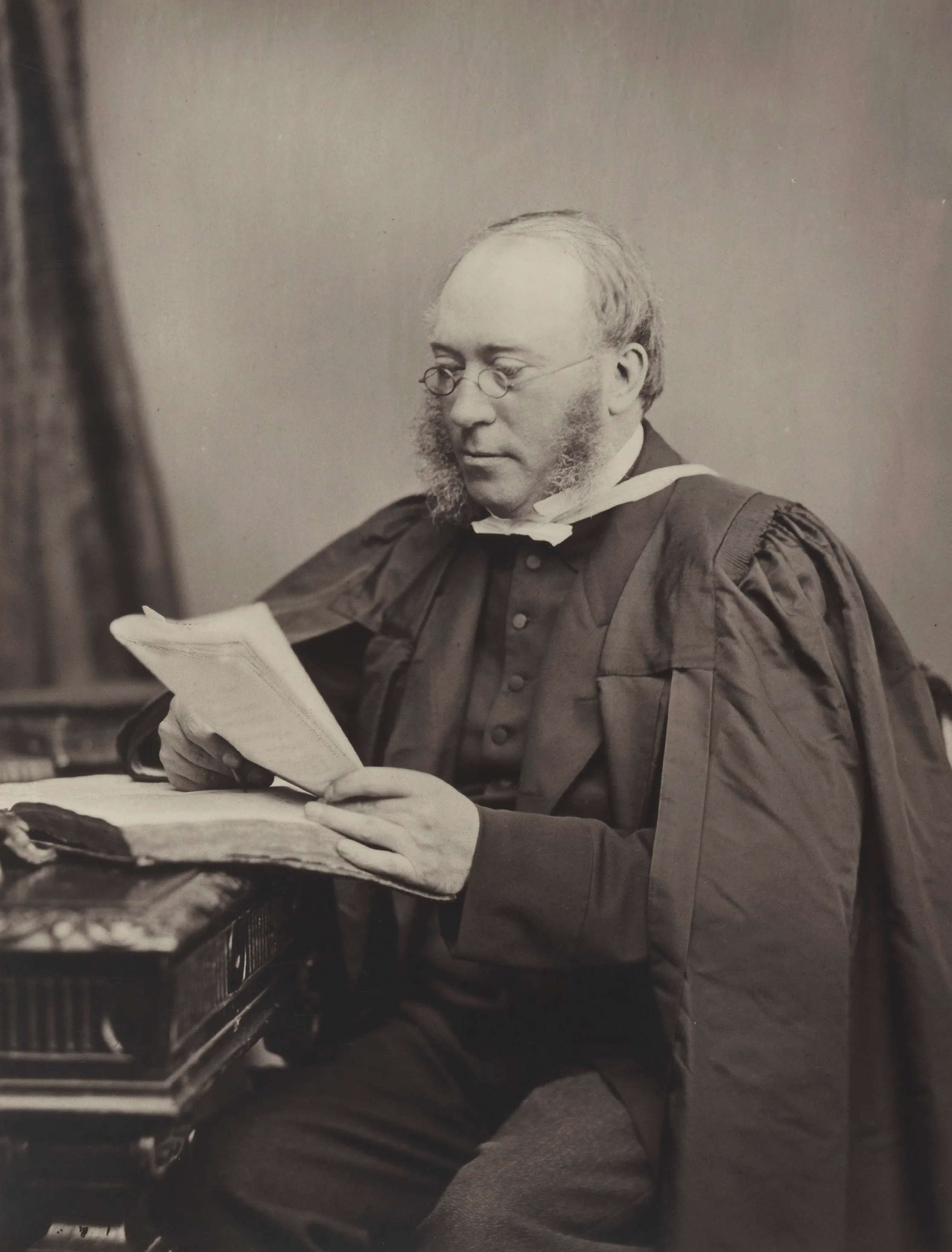
- Portrait by Thomas Annan, 1871

Professor of Divinity University of Glasgow
- In office 1873–1895
- Preceded by: John Caird
- Succeeded by: William Hastie

Professor of Biblical Criticism University of Glasgow
- In office 1863–1873
- Succeeded by: William Stuart

William Purdie Dickson DD LLD (1823–1901) was a Scottish minister and theologian. He was Professor of Divinity at the University of Glasgow from 1873 to 1895. The William Dickson Prize is named in his honour.

== Early life ==
William Purdie Dickson was born 22 October 1823 in Pettinain, Lanarkshire, Scotland, the son of Rev George Dickson, the minister of Kilrenny in Fife. The younger Dickson attended Lanark School and St. Andrews University. He was lincensed to preach as a Church of Scotland minister by the Presbytery of Linlithgow in 1845.

He was ordained in Cameron, Fife, on 9 September 1851 and received a Doctor of Divinity from St. Andrews in 1865 and a Doctor of Laws (LLD) from Edinburgh University in 1885.

== Academic life ==
In 1863 Dickson came to Glasgow, Scotland, as the Professor of Divinity and Biblical Criticism at the University of Glasgow, a position he held until 1873. From 1873 to 1895 he served as the professor of divinity after which he was succeeded by William Hastie.

Additionally, in 1866 he was also appointed the curator of the University of Glasgow Library. In that capacity he rearranged the entire library inventory into a single alphabetical sequence and produced a complete catalogue and other finding aids.

Dickson also translated several publications during his career, including Theodor Mommsen's History of Rome and Provinces of the Roman Empire.

He was President of the Library Association in 1888 and Convener of the Education Committee of the Church of Scotland from 1875 to 1888.

Dickson was awarded the Doctor of Divinity degree from The University of Glasgow in 1896.

== William Dickson Prize ==
The William Dickson Prize was founded at The University of Glasgow in 1895 by Dickson and his wife. The prize is awarded annually to the most distinguished student in the College of Divinity.

== Personal life ==
Dickson was married to Tassie Wardlaw Small on 7 December 1853 in Cameron, Fife, Scotland. His wife was the daughter of John Small (1797-1847), acting Librarian of the University of Edinburgh, and the sister of John Small (1828-1886), who succeeded his father as Librarian. Dickson's wife and family were members of the Smalls of Dirnanean, Perthshire, Scotland. The couple had two daughters and a son.

He lived his final years at 16 Victoria Crescent in the Dowanhill district of Glasgow.

William Purdie Dickson died on 9 March 1901.

== Publications ==
- The Theological Chairs of the Scottish Universities (1883)
- The Glasgow University Library (1888)

Academic offices
| Preceded by John Caird | Professor of Divinity University of Glasgow; 1873 - 1895 | Succeeded by William Hastie |
