= William Kerr Fraser =

British civil servant (1929–2018)

Sir William Fraser GCB

Chancellor of the University of Glasgow
- In office 1996–2006
- Preceded by: Sir Alexander Cairncross
- Succeeded by: Sir Kenneth Calman

Principal and Vice-Chancellor of the University of Glasgow
- In office 1988–1995
- Preceded by: Sir Alwyn Williams
- Succeeded by: Sir Graeme Davies

Permanent Secretary to the Scottish Office
- In office 1978–1988
- Preceded by: Sir Nicholas Morrison
- Succeeded by: Sir Russell Hillhouse

Personal details
- Born: 18 March 1929 Glasgow, Scotland
- Died: 13 September 2018 (aged 89)
- Spouse: Lady Marion Fraser (m. 1956; died 2016)
- Education: University of Glasgow
- Profession: Civil servant

Sir William Kerr Fraser GCB (18 March 1929 – 13 September 2018) was a British civil servant, who served as Permanent Secretary at the Scottish Office, and as Principal and later Chancellor of the University of Glasgow.

== Early life ==
William Kerr Fraser was educated at Eastwood High School in Glasgow. He studied at the University of Glasgow (M.A., LL.B.), where he was President of the Students' Representative Council from 1951–52.

== Civil Service ==
He joined the Scottish Home Department, part of the Civil Service, in 1953, becoming Private Secretary to Parliamentary Under-Secretary of State in 1959, and to the Secretary of State in 1966. In 1967, he became Assistant Secretary at the Regional Development Division, and in 1971 became Under-Secretary at the Scottish Home and Health Department. In 1975, he became Deputy Secretary, and in 1978 Permanent Secretary at the Scottish Office, serving until 1988. He was appointed a Companion of the Order of the Bath (CB) in 1978, and created a Knight Commander of the order (KCB) in 1979 and a Knight Grand Cross of the order (GCB) in 1984.

== University of Glasgow ==
Sir William became Principal and Vice-Chancellor of the University of Glasgow in 1988 and served in these posts until 1995. In 1996, he was elected Chancellor of the University. He stood down from this role in 2006 and was succeeded by Professor Sir Kenneth Calman. The HUB Building at the University of Glasgow was refurbished as a student services centre and named the Fraser Building in his honour. He was awarded an honorary LL.D. by the University in 1982.

== Personal life ==
In 1956, Fraser married Marion Forbes, a Past President of the Queen Margaret Union, then the women's union of the University of Glasgow. They had three sons and one daughter, and several grandchildren – one of whom is himself a former President of the Queen Margaret Union, Colum Fraser.

Sir William served as Governor of the Caledonian Research Foundation from 1990–99 and Chairman of the Royal Commission on the Ancient and Historical Monuments of Scotland from 1995–2000. He was appointed a Fellow of the Royal Society of Edinburgh in 1985, and an honorary Fellow of the Royal College of Physicians and Surgeons in 1992, and of the Royal Scottish Academy of Music and Drama in 1995. He received honorary degrees (LL.D.) from the Universities of Glasgow (1982), Strathclyde (1991) and Aberdeen (1993), and a Doctorate honoris causa from Edinburgh (1995).

Government offices
Preceded by Sir Nicholas Morrison	Permanent Secretary to the Scottish Office; 1978–1988	Succeeded by Sir Russell Hillhouse
Academic offices
Preceded by Professor Sir Alwyn Williams	Principal and Vice-Chancellor of the University of Glasgow; 1988 to 1995	Succeeded by Sir Graeme Davies
Preceded by Professor Sir Alexander Cairncross	Chancellor of the University of Glasgow; 1996 to 2006	Succeeded by Professor Sir Kenneth Calman
