= Duncan Macfarlan =

Scottish minister

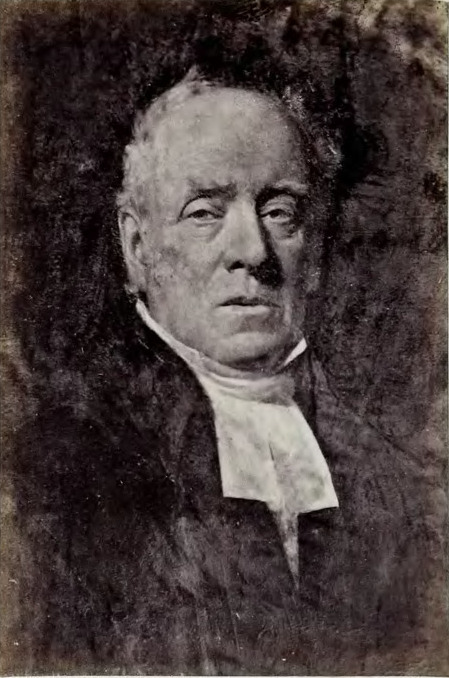
- Portrait by John Graham Gilbert
- Born: 27 September 1771; Drymen
- Died: 25 November 1857 (aged 86)
- Position held: Moderator of the General Assembly of the Church of Scotland, Principal of the University of Glasgow (1823–1857)

Duncan Macfarlan (1771–1857) was a Scottish minister. He was twice Moderator of the General Assembly of the Church of Scotland both in 1819 and in its most critical year of 1843. He was Principal of Glasgow University from 1823 to 1857.

== Life ==
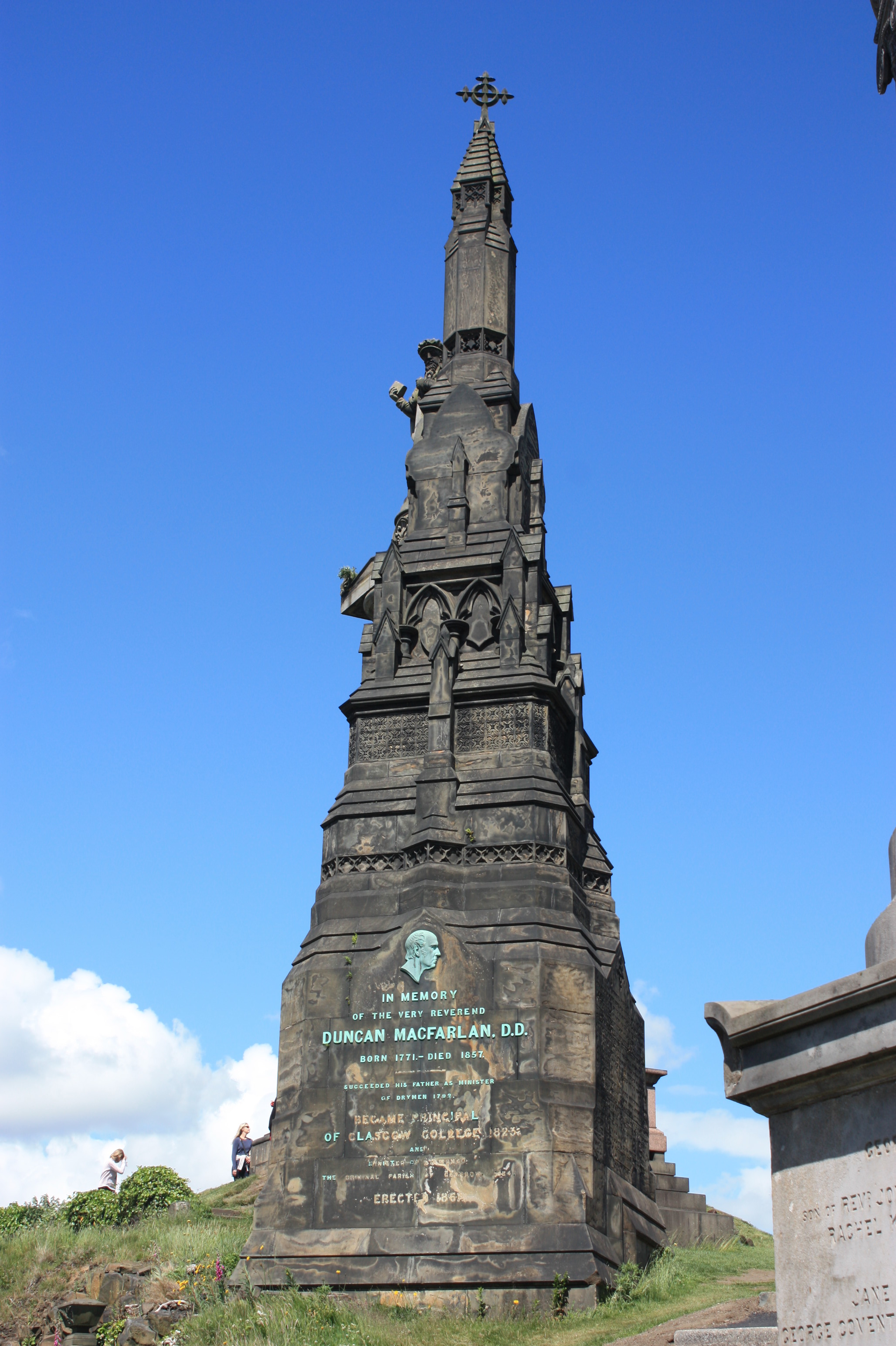
The huge monument to Rev Duncan Macfarlan, Glasgow Necropolis

He was born on 27 September 1771 in the manse at Drymen, a village north-east of Glasgow. He was the son of Rev Duncan Macfarlan (1708–1791) minister of Drymen, and maternal grandson of Rev John Allan. His father was 63 years old when he was born. He was educated locally then went to Glasgow University where he studied Philosophy and Literature, graduating MA in 1788. He then decided to take a further degree in divinity. He was licensed to preach on 28 June 1791, two days before his father's death. In 1792 he became minister of Drymen church.

Glasgow University awarded him an honorary doctorate (DD) in 1806. In 1819 he succeeded Rev John Campbell as Moderator of the General Assembly.

In 1823 he was elected both Principal and Vice Chancellor of Glasgow University. He remained Principal until his death in 1857, a remarkable 34 years in the role. He moved to take the ministry of Glasgow High Church in 1824.

He died on 25 November 1857 at Drymen. He is buried beneath a huge monument in the Glasgow Necropolis. It stands in front of the John Knox Monument, and forms an important part of the local Glasgow skyline.

== Family ==
In 1797 he married his cousin, Anne Allan (1778–1814) of Row near Cardross. They had nine children.

== Publications ==
- The Right Appointment of Ministers (1840)
- Railway Travel on the Lord’s Day Indefensible (1841) a curious tract against Sunday travel
- Bible Temperance and Present Duty (1847)
- A Concise System of Theology (posthumous- 1860)

== Artistic recognition ==
He was portrayed by John Graham Gilbert RSA.

Academic offices
Preceded by William Taylor	Principal of the University of Glasgow; 1823-1857	Succeeded by Thomas Barclay
