= Archibald Davidson =

Scottish minister

Archibald Davidson (c. 1732 – 1803) was a Scottish minister who was moderator of the General Assembly of the Church of Scotland in 1788 and was principal of Glasgow University.

== Life ==
He was born about 1732 in the manse in the village of Crawfordjohn in South Lanarkshire, the son of Rev Robert Davidson.

He attended Glasgow University where he graduated M.A. in 1752. Later that year (in November), he was writing home from Göttingen University to William Cullen, a professor at Glasgow University. He wrote with a fluid confident style, had had conversations with the German professors and promised his friend a good German dictionary if he could find one. He was in the company of young Scottish gentlemen and noblemen, and his future career would depend on good connections and the patronage they would offer.

Six years later, he was presented by the commissioner for William, Earl of Dundonald, who had electoral interests in the area, to Paisley High Kirk as 2nd Charge Minister, where he was ordained on 7 September 1758. He remained there for three years, and represented the Presbytery in the General Assembly of the Church of Scotland in 1760. The following year, 1761, he transferred to the nearby Parish of Inchinnan. He was presented by the Patron and major Heritor, John Campbell of Blythswood, (who also had electoral interests in the area) on 17 December 1760, but was not able to take up the post until 20 October 1761, . suggesting he was opposed by some members of the Kirk Session (a not uncommon occurrence).

While minister of Inchinnan, he took part in agitation in response to the granting to Roman Catholics of some relief from legal restrictions under which they suffered at the time. He signed a proclamation in Glasgow newspapers, in the name of the Minister, Elders and Heads of Families of the Parish of Inchinnan, denouncing "the unchristian spirit and savage cruelties of Popery", declaring that "we desire to see no Papist suffering ... for conscience sake, nor for his speculative opinions, however absurd or erroneous, while he lives quietly and inoffensively, and does not attempt in any manner of way to seduce or pervert others". However, they would not submit to allowing Popish priests, "ever zealous and artful ... to teach and preach openly, and with impunity, in a Protestant country" They threatened to "use every legal and constitutional measure in our power" to make sure it did not happen. This was part of widespread opposition, including the Gordon Riots of the following year, but the Relief Act had already been passed in Parliament. Davidson signed the Proclamation, along with "Masons".

In March 1792, he was appointed dean of the Thistle Chapel. He died on 7 July 1803.

== Family ==
While in Inchinnan, Davidson married Grizell Scott, daughter of Rev Peter Scott, his late colleague in Paisley High Kirk. Their banns of marriage were published on 17 July 1767 and from the marriage resulted three sons, Robert (1768), John Peter (1770), Andrew (1773) and three daughters, Ann (1771), Barbara (1775) and Elizabeth (177?) Robert Davidson was later Professor of Law at Glasgow University.

== Principal of Glasgow University ==
After 25 years at Inchinnan, Davidson became principal of Glasgow University. This was a Crown appointment and he owed his appointment to his involvement with the political networks of Henry Dundas, the virtual ruler of Scotland (on behalf of the King). The post had been promised to his older brother, John Davidson, who had become too enfeebled to take up the chair, and Dundas honored the promise by giving it to the younger brother, passing over the favourite candidate of the professors at the time. The university made Davidson a Doctor of Divinity that same year, but there is no trace of any previous academic post. The Principalship was regarded as lucrative – a stipend of £600 – but with only honorific duties. However, it involved complex political maneuverings around the other Patronage appointments to professors posts in the university. Davidson was regarded as perfectly "safe". One success was getting his son, the non-descript Robert Davidson, appointed Regius Professor of Civil Law at the university. In 1787, Adam Smith wrote to Davidson, accepting the post of Lord Rector of the university.

== Moderator of the General Assembly ==
In 1788, he was elected Moderator of the General Assembly of the Church of Scotland. This was the centenary year of the so-called Glorious Revolution, which had, the church believed, restored the Church of Scotland to its just rights and privileges, and re-established Presbyterian order. The King in his letter to them asked them to avoid any "disputes and unnecessary and unbecoming discussions" (Principal Acts, page 5) and in response the Assembly wanted "to embrace every opportunity of testifying the ardent zeal which we feel for the support of Your Majesty's Government and Royal person". It thanked the King for delivering the nation from the threat of war, securing the independence of "a neighbouring Protestant country", and re-establishing an old alliance with it. This was the United Provinces from which William of Orange had invaded England in 1688, so the Assembly asked the King to take the opportunity to commemorate "the Revolution of 1688 which delivered us from Popery and arbitrary power". They themselves passed An Act Appointing a National Thanksgiving in Commemoration of the Revolution in 1688 which had "delivered the Nation from Civil and Religious Oppression, set proper bounds to the Royal Prerogative, secured the Liberties and just Rights of the People, and confirmed to this National Church all the Religious Rights and Privileges which it now enjoys under the illustrious House of Hanover". 5 November was to be a day of Solemn Thanksgiving, which was to be announced from the pulpit the Sabbath before with "suitable Exhortations". A thousand copies of the Act were printed and sent to every parish.

Meanwhile, the King had, as normal, awarded the Assembly £1,000 for promoting the Protestant religion and loyalty in the Highlands and Islands. They set up a commission "for promoting the knowledge of true religion, suppressing Popery and profaneness ... (having) particular regard to such parishes in South Uist, Small Isles, Glenco, Harris, the countries of Moidart, Glengary and the other parishes of the Synods Glenelg and Argyle ... (affected) by the prevalency of Popery and ignorance". Missionaries were to be sent, who would be persons of "undoubted loyalty to his Majesty and of competent skills in the principles of Divinity, and particularly in Popish controversies" (p13) and they were to "teach the principles and duties of the true Christian Protestant religion, and the obligations they are under to duty and loyalty to our Sovereign King George, and obedience to the laws". This committee was empowered to call on the government for help, if need be. This was an annual commission, as were other commissions to "enquire into the publishing of books and pamphlets, tending towards the promoting of opinions of any kind, inconsistent with our Confession of Faith", and it was to contribute what it could to the suppression of vice and immorality. There were detailed rules to make sure the missionaries would only be paid if they actually did some missionary work (p23). Similarly, it considered proposals to avoid people unconnected with a parish being ordained elders there, as well as stringent rules for making sure only fit and proper persons were licensed to preach the Gospel, and even more stringent rules for the training of ministers (six years post -M.A. study in philosophy and then had to pass a number of tests – producing an exegesis in Latin on a contested topic in divinity, a homily in English and a "popular sermon". At the end, Presbytery should check that the student was over 21, sober and "well affected to the happy establishment in this Kingdom, both in Church and State" (p 28) with sufficient knowledge in the Greek and Latin languages (and, often, Hebrew), and in philosophy and theology.

The Assembly agreed to declare their abhorrence of the slave trade (page 40) and their earnest wish that the legislature would do something about it, but rejected a motion to petition the House of Commons on the subject. They set up a committee to examine how new taxes on horses and other taxes would affect clergy. A petition from a congregation in the city of St John in New Brunswick was accepted as a parish of the Church of Scotland.

== Sources ==
- Scotland's Opposition to the Popish Bill. Glasgow: David Paterson. 1780 – via Google Books.
- The Principal Acts of the General Assembly of the Church of Scotland. Edinburgh: George Mosman. 1781 – via Google Books.
- "Preferments". The Scots Magazine. 47. Edinburgh: J Murray. 1785 – via Google Books.
- "Scotland". The Edinburgh Magazine, or Literary Miscellany. VII. Edinburgh: J Murray. 1788 – via Google Books.
- Thomson, John (1832). An account of the life, lectures and writings of William Cullen. Edinburgh: Blackwood. p. 390 – via Google Books.
- Scott, Hew (1920). Fasti Ecclesiae Scoticanae. Vol. III (New ed.). Edinburgh: Oliver and Boyd.
- Smith, Adam (1987). The Correspondence of Adam Smith. Oxford University Press – via Google Books.
- Heizer, Ruth Bradfute (1988). Bradfute beginnings: the story of the ancestors and descendants of Robert Bradfute, (1749-1816?) of Scotland and Virginia. Gateway Press. pp. 30–31 – via Google Books.
- Emerson, Roger L (2007). Academic Patronage in the Scottish Enlightenment: Glasgow, Edinburgh and St Andrews Universities. Edinburgh University Press – via Google Books.
- Hook, Andrew; Sher, Richard B (1995). The Glasgow Enlightenment. Eighteenth Century Scottish Studies Society. p. 308 – via Google Books.
- "The University of Glasgow Story – Browse Graduates". University of Glasgow.

== See also ==
- List of moderators of the General Assembly of the Church of Scotland

Church of Scotland titles
Preceded by Robert Liston	Moderator of the General Assembly of the Church of Scotland; 1788	Succeeded by George Hill
Academic offices
Preceded by William Leechman	Principal of the University of Glasgow; 1785-1803	Succeeded by William Taylor
