= Thomas Barclay (minister) =

Minister of the Church of Scotland (1792–1873)

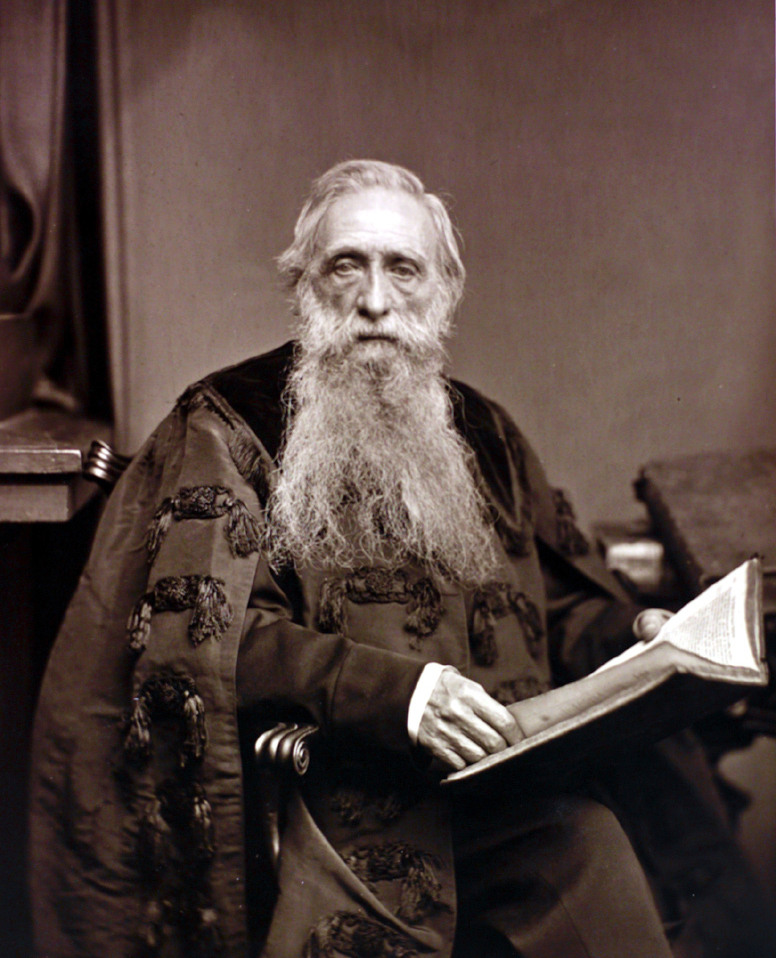
- Barclay, c. 1870

Principal of the University of Glasgow
- In office 1858–1873

Personal details
- Born: 14 June 1792
- Died: 23 February 1873 (aged 80)
- Education: King's College, Aberdeen
- Profession: Minister

Thomas Barclay (14 June 1792 – 23 February 1873) was a minister in the Church of Scotland and Principal of the University of Glasgow.

Barclay was born in Unst, one of the North Isles of the Shetland Islands in the far north of Scotland. He studied at King's College, Aberdeen, the predecessor institution of the University of Aberdeen, graduating M.A., and relocated to London to work as a journalist. He later returned to Scotland to become a minister in the Church of Scotland.

He was appointed Principal of the University of Glasgow in 1858, and worked to raise funds to build the university's new campus in Gilmorehill. He is said to have been popular amongst the students due to his resemblance to Scottish Protestant reformer John Knox. He died in office in 1873.

== Biography ==
Barclay was born on 14 June 1792, in the manse on Unst, northmost of the Shetland Islands, of which parish his father, the Rev. James Barclay, was minister. He was entered of King's College, Aberdeen, in 1808. Here he attained considerable distinction. He took the degree of M.A. 28 March 1812, and subsequently prosecuted his theological studies for four years, during which he taught elocution at Aberdeen. Later he proceeded to London, where for four years, 1818–22, he acted as one of the parliamentary and general reporters of the 'Times.' He received licence to preach the gospel from the presbytery of Lerwick 27 June 1821, and quit the 'Times' in the following year, when he was presented by Lord Dundas, and ordained 12 September 1822, to the parish of Dunrossness, in Shetland. Here he remained until his presentation by the same patron to the parish of Lerwick in October 1827, to which he was admitted 13 December following.

He was elected clerk of the synod of Shetland 27 April 1831. In 1840 Sir Henry Holland heard 'an admirable sermon' from Mr. Barclay, whom he accompanied the next day on a boating excursion to the Isle of Noss. A sudden and furious squall arose. Mr. Barclay was the only one who retained his presence of mind; but he, 'deemed,' as Sir Henry Holland says, to be 'one of the best boatmen in Scotland, seized the tiller, and by his firmness and skill brought us into safety.' Sir Henry Holland in 1858, on the occurrence of a vacancy in the principalship of the university of Glasgow, urged the claims of Dr. Barclay to the appointment upon Sir George Grey, expressing his conviction that the man who could preach such a sermon on Sunday, and next day by his firmness and promptitude save a boat from being swamped, was one eminently fitted for the government of young men and of a great college. 'How far this contributed to it I know not; but Dr. Barclay received the appointment, which he has ever since held with high honour and usefulness'. Barclay had removed, September 1843, to Peterculter, Aberdeenshire, and in July of the following year accepted a call to Currie, south of Edinburgh, on the presentation of Sir James Gibson-Craig, bart., of Riccarton. During his tenure (1844 to 1858) he established an excellent parochial library in the village.

On 10 February 1849 the University of Aberdeen awarded him an honorary Doctor of Divinity (D.D.). Dr. Barclay took a somewhat prominent part, along with the late Dr. Robert Lee, in 'waging in the church courts the battle of religious liberalism'. Barclay supported Dr. Lee in the liturgical innovations introduced by the latter into the Scottish system of worship. From the time of his appointment, however, to the principalship of the university of Glasgow, in succession to Dr. Duncan Macfarlane, to which he was admitted 13 Feb 1858, he devoted himself exclusively to the duties of that office. Latterly his energy was impaired by delicate health and advanced age. For over twenty years, indeed, he was a sufferer from asthmatic bronchitis, and he found it necessary to spend a portion of each winter in Egypt, on the climate of which he wrote a long and valuable article for a medical journal. Dr. Barclay died at his official residence, on Sunday afternoon, 23 Feb 1873, and was buried at Sighthill Cemetery.

The Rev. Dr. John Caird, his successor as Principal, preached a university sermon, 'In Memoriam,' on Sunday, 9 March, which was afterwards published, with a dedication 'to Mrs. Barclay and her family.’

Barclay married in 1820 the daughter of Captain Adamson, of Kirkhill; his wife, two married daughters and a son, who was settled as a medical man in China, survived him. Dr. Barclay was not eminent as a pulpit orator, but he was a sound and varied scholar, deeply read, not only in biblical learning, but in various branches of philology, and more particularly in the languages of northern Europe. As Dr. Caird said, he 'wrote no books.' He contributed, however, a sermon on 'Charity the Characteristic of Christianity' to the first volume of the 'Church of Scotland Pulpit,' Edinburgh, 1845, and also published in 1857 his 'Speech against the Transmission of an Overture condemning the System of Government Education in India.’

Academic offices
Preceded by Duncan Macfarlan	Principal of the University of Glasgow; 1856-1873	Succeeded by John Caird
