= William Leechman =

Scottish minister, theologian and academic (1706–1785)

- Born: 1706; Dolphinton, Scotland
- Died: 3 December 1785 (aged 78–79); Glasgow, Scotland, Great Britain
- Occupations: Theologian, Professor, Moderator of the General Assembly of the Church of Scotland
- Notable work: The Composition of the Ancients
- Spouse: Bridget Balfour

William Leechman or Leishman (1706 – 3 December 1785) was a Scottish minister, theologian and academic. He was Professor of Divinity and later Principal at Glasgow University.

== Early life and education ==
The son of William Leechman, a farmer of Dolphinton, Lanarkshire, he was educated at the parish school; the father had taken down the quarters of Robert Baillie of Jerviswood, which had been exposed after his execution (24 December 1684) on Lanark Tolbooth. In gratitude for this service, the Baillie family helped young Leechman to go to the University of Edinburgh, where he graduated 16 April 1724. He studied divinity there under William Hamilton (1669–1732).

== Adulthood and marriage ==
He was tutor to James Geddes, and then around 1727 he became tutor to William Mure of Caldwell, a friend of David Hume. The family passed the winters at Glasgow, where he attended the lectures of Francis Hutcheson. In October 1731, he was licensed to preach by the presbytery of Paisley, where Scottish bookseller Andrew Millar's father, Robert Millar, had also been licensed. By 1745, Andrew Millar was selling Leechman's sermons in London.

In 1736, Leechman was ordained minister of Beith in the neighbourhood of Caldwell. He was moderator of a synod at Irvine in 1740, and on 7 April 1741 preached a sermon at Glasgow "on the ... character of a minister of the gospel", which was published, and passed through several editions.

In July 1743, he married Bridget Balfour, daughter of James Balfour of Pilrig, a noted Edinburgh businessman, connecting him to her brothers James Balfour and the bookseller John Balfour, and also Robert Whytt and Gavin Hamilton who had married Bridget's sisters. At the end of the year he was elected professor of divinity at the University of Glasgow by the casting vote of the lord rector, in a closely contested election with William Craig and John MacLaurin also candidates. He resigned Beith on 3 January 1744 upon his election. The presbytery of Glasgow refused to enrol him, alleging that he had made heretical statements in a sermon published in 1743 "On the Nature, Reasonableness, and Advantages of Prayer". He was accused of laying too little stress upon the merits of the intercession of the Saviour. Hume criticised the sermon in a letter to Leechman's pupil, William Mure, suggesting minute corrections of style, and urging that Leechman really made prayer a mere "rhetorical figure". The synod of Glasgow and Ayr rejected the accusation of the presbytery, and their acquittal was confirmed by the general assembly.

Leechman's lectures were popular, and he followed the example first set by Hutcheson of using English instead of Latin. James Wodrow gives a long account of them. They dealt with polemical divinity, the evidences of Christianity, and the composition of sermons. He refused to publish them.

He visited England with his old pupil Geddes in 1744, and made the acquaintance of Richard Price. In 1757, he served as Moderator of the General Assembly of the Church of Scotland. In 1759 he went to Bristol in ill-health and drank the waters at Clifton. In 1761 he was appointed Principal of the University of Glasgow in place of Rev Neil Campbell, but for a time continued to lecture.

He had two paralytic strokes in 1785, and died on 3 December that year. His position as Principal was filled by Archibald Davidson.

== Sources ==
- Circulating Enlightenment

Attribution

This article incorporates text from a publication now in the public domain: "Leechman, William". Dictionary of National Biography. London: Smith, Elder & Co. 1885–1900.

Church of Scotland titles
Preceded by George Reid	Moderator of the General Assembly of the Church of Scotland; 1757	Succeeded by Thomas Turnbull
Academic offices
Preceded by Neil Campbell	Principal and Vice-Chancellor of the University of Glasgow; 1761–1785	Succeeded by Archibald Davidson
