= Neil Campbell (minister) =

Scottish minister

Neil Campbell (1678 - 1761) was a Scottish minister, moderator of the General Assembly of the Church of Scotland at the start of the Original Secession and Principal of Glasgow University during a flourishing period of the Scottish Enlightenment.

== Life ==
Neil Campbell's origins are obscure, though it is clear he was well connected to the Patronage networks of the Argyle Interest, which was to triumph in the so-called Glorious Revolution.

Hew Scott's "Fasti Ecclesiae..." (which was based on reading original parish records) says he was the son of Major John Campbell of the Clenary family, but Neil was sent to his uncle, Rev Patrick Campbell of Glenaray and his wife Jean McIver, to raise and educate him in the church.

Some genealogy websites, and others who may have access to private family papers, suggest he was the, possibly illegitimate, son of a John Campbell (and possibly a cadet of the Argyle family).

Neil matriculated at Glasgow University on 1 January 1697 to study Divinity. There is no record of him graduating, a not uncommon occurrence. He was licensed to preach as a Church of Scotland minister by the Presbytery of Argyll in June 1701.

=== Minister ===
He was ordained Minister of Kilmallie in Lochaber on 9 September 1702. Kilmallie was the large parish, in geographical extent, and its Highland population generally held Jacobite sympathies, implying a lean towards the Catholic cause.

Seven years later, he transferred to Rosneath, on the Firth of Clyde just opposite the traditional Campbell heartlands. He received the call on 13 June 1709 and admitted on 15 July. He served there for another seven years.

Meanwhile, the Church Patronage (Scotland) Act 1711 had come into force, which meant the Crown, and other Patrons, could present Ministers to vacancies in their churches. Neil Campbell was presented to the Kirk at Renfrew by George I - really Argyle - on 15 November 1715. He was called on 26 April, and subsequently translated and admitted on 18 July 1716. He served there until 1728, when through the influence of his Patrons, the Crown appointed him Principal of Glasgow University.

=== Principal ===
The Principal of Glasgow University was a key appointment in the Patronage networks available to the Crown. He was an important player in the Presbytery of Glasgow which was in turn a major influence on the Town Council, and in Parliamentary elections. There were shifting (and interlocking) allegiances to Montrose, Hamilton and Argyle networks. Neil Campbell was appointed in 1727 at the instigation of the Lord Justice General, Lord Islay and his brother, the Duke of Argyle, largely as a safe pair of hands in a religiously and politically disputed terrain.

The teaching at Glasgow had been reformed by his predecessor, Principal Stirling, and a number of important appointments were made during Campbell's tenure, notably Adam Smith and William Cullen - who turned the Glasgow medical school into a rival to Edinburgh's, which was made possible by major increases in finance, again from Government and other sources of patronage. Another appointment was the scientist and educator John Anderson, whose Anderson's Institution developed into Strathclyde University. Campbell might not be able to take credit for the appointments or for the finance, as he was regarded as a somewhat weak leader, but Glasgow was even more flourishing at the end of his regime than it was at the beginning. Smith recalled his time there as by far the most useful and therefore as by far the happiest and most honourable period of my life.

Campbell helped negotiate a return to Glasgow of copies of important archives of the pre-Reformation Roman Catholic Archdiocese of Glasgow, from the Scots College in Paris.

A lot of Campbell's time was taken up in contending with religious divisions among the staff (reflected in student concerns) and in the Glasgow Presbytery. He unsuccessfully tried to defend his colleague, the Professor of Divinity John Simson, from charges of heresy brought by the Presbytery, and ended up having to take over all his classes, without any increase in pay (though some compensation was given much later). Campbell?s own religious philosophy seems to have been hyper-Calvinist, which might explain his quarrels with the philosopher Francis Hutcheson and his opposition to David Hume getting a professorship at Glasgow.

He was in post during challenging times, including the occupation of Glasgow by the Young Pretender. He loyally supported the Government. It is no surprise that he seems to have had a stroke in 1753. He did not resign his post, but lived on, disabled, until his death on 22 June 1761.

=== Moderator ===
==== 1732 General Assembly, the beginnings of Secession ====
Principal Campbell was elected Moderator of the General Assembly of the Church of Scotland for 1732. The King?s Commissioner brought a message of respect and admiration, along with encouragement to wise, sober debate, from King. In return the Assembly voted a loyal address in return, expressing gratitude, loyalty etc. It expressed particular gratitude for the King's gift of £1000, and it made the customary arrangements for using it to fight Roman Catholicism in the Highlands and Islands. The Assembly also voted to urge all congregations to contribute to the Society in Scotland for Propagating Christian Knowledge (SSPCK), which had similar missionary aims in the Highlands. Both also contributed to the spread of the English language there, along with loyalty to the House of Hanover.

A less routine, and more eventful, decision was taken to regulate the procedures for filling vacant Ministers? posts in Parishes, where the Patron had failed to do so. The Church Patronage (Scotland) Act 1711 was a long-standing grievance to the Church of Scotland, and it annually protested against it. The decision that year was meant to bring some order into the few, but fraught, occasions when the Patron, through death, or illness, or oversight, had not presented a candidate to a vacancy within the six-months required. In these cases the right fell to the Presbytery in which the Parish lay, and each proceeded in its own way, some involving the whole congregation of the Parish concerned, most limiting it to a small group of Heritors and Elders. The Assembly enacted that this latter process should be the norm. Some of the Ministers attending objected, claiming that the majority of Presbyteries consulted preferred the involvement of the whole congregation of a Parish. They were further incensed when their objections were not recorded in the final minutes of the debate. (An Act of the 1730 Assembly has abolished the process of recording objections to decisions of all the Courts of the Church.). This decision was later repealed, but the leading protester, Ebenezer Erskine, though an Englishman, went on, three years later, to lead his supporters out of the Church of Scotland to form the Original Secession Church, the first of many splits in Scottish Presbyterianism.

==== 1737 General Assembly ====
Principal Campbell must have nonetheless been held in high esteem, for he was again elected Moderator for the 1737 Assembly, a less momentous one. The same courtesies were exchanged with the King - who this time urged them to work together for the increase of piety and virtue, the preventing of the growth of Popery, and the suppressing of profaneness and immorality, and earnestly urged them to avoid all disputes and contentions among yourselves, and to proceed upon the business proper for your consideration, with that unanimity and brotherly love, as may justly be expected from so venerable a body. The ??Secession?? mentioned above was meanwhile gathering pace.

The Assembly responded loyally, though it did express a hope that the King would relieve them of the Patronage grievance they had been protesting about annually. They promised to put the King's Bounty to good use in the more remote and less civilised parts of (his) British dominions ... to counteract the Popish emissaries trafficking in these parts.

Some Presbyteries had complained that a decision of the previous year meant the Assembly was approving some heretical opinions. It passed a special Act declaring this was not so. Some other Presbyteries had complained that some Elders attending the Assembly were not properly qualified (either not residing in their Parishes, or harbouring dubious opinions). A special Act was passed urging Presbyteries only to send properly qualified representatives in future. There seemed to have been an over-supply of divinity students, so the Assembly enacted that there was no longer any need for Presbyteries and Synods to provide Bursaries for new students.

== Family ==
Neil Campbell published his intention to marry Henrietta Campbell, daughter of Patrick Campbell of Kilduskland, on 17 June 1705, and he subsequently had four daughters and seven sons by her. One of his sons, Rev Colin Campbell, followed his father as Minister at Renfrew. Another, Duncan Campbell, took charge of managing the prison hulks, which transported the first prisoners to Botany Bay and another of which was sold off and became the famous HMS Bounty (formerly known as The Bethia). His daughter Mary " Mally " married William Richard Betham in 1817 and they were parents to Elizabeth " Betsy " who married Capt William Bligh, famous for the Mutiny on the Bounty. Neil Campbell seems to have inherited an estate - and minor title - near Inverary, called variously Clenary/Clenarie/Clonary/Clunary/Claonairigh. In 1744, he was appointed a Chaplain to the King, with joint share in the emoluments of the Dean, etc. of the Chapel Royal in Scotland.

Campbell had a stroke in 1753. Though incapable, he remained in post, in a crumbling Principal's House, until his death on 22 June 1761. He was buried on 25 June in Blackfriar's Kirkyard, Glasgow (which was cleared in the 19th Century along with the Old College Buildings). The bones were moved to the Glasgow Necropolis.

== Sources ==
- Principal Acts of the General Assembly of the Church of Scotland Church Law Society, Edinburgh 1843 (Online at british-history.ac.uk )
- Innes, Cosmo Registrum episcopatus glasguensis: munimenta Ecclesie metropolitane glasguensis a sede restaurata seculo ineunte XII ad reformatam religionem Maitland Club, Ballantyne & Hughes, Edinburgh, 1843
- Chambers, W & R Chambers' encyclopaedia: a dictionary of universal knowledge London, 1868
- Campbell, P C Account of the Clan Iver Edinburgh, 1873
- Morren, Nathaniel Annals of the General Assembly of the Church of Scotland ... Church of Scotland, Edinburgh, 1838
- Scott, Hew Fasti ecclesiae scoticanae; the succession of ministers in the Church of Scotland from the reformation New Edition, Vol III Synod of Glasgow and Vol IV Synods of Argyle and of Perth and Stirling, Oliver and Boyd, Edinburgh, 1925 []
- Clan Campbell Society Journal of the Clan Campbell Society (United States of America). Vol 17 -19, 1971.[]
- Campbell, R H & Skinner, A S Adam Smith Routledge, London, 1985
- Skoczylas, Anne Mr. Simson's Knotty Case: divinity, politics, and due process in early eighteenth-century Scotland McGill-Queen?s Press, Canada, 2001
- Emerson, Roger L Academic Patronage in the Scottish Enlightenment: Glasgow, Edinburgh and St Andrews Universities. Edinburgh University Press, 2007
- Ross, I A The Life of Adam Smith Oxford University Press 2010
- Glasgow University The University of Glasgow Story (updated website )
- GASHE (Gateway to the Archives of Scottish Higher Education - updated website)
- thePeerage.com - a genealogical survey of the peerage of Britain as well as the royal families of Europe. (updated website )

== See also ==
- List of moderators of the General Assembly of the Church of Scotland

Church of Scotland titles
| Preceded by James Smith | Moderator of the General Assembly of the Church of Scotland; 1732 | Succeeded by John Gowdie |
| Preceded by Alexander Anderson | Moderator of the General Assembly of the Church of Scotland; 1737 | Succeeded by James Ramsay |
Academic offices
| Preceded by John Stirling | Principal and Vice-Chancellor of the University of Glasgow; 1727 to 1761 | Succeeded by William Leechman |
