= Nations in Scottish universities =

Type of student society

Nations are student divisions at some of the ancient universities of Scotland.

Nations were a characteristic of some of the ancient universities and have gradually decreased in significance in recent times. As the newest of the ancient universities, nations never existed at the University of Edinburgh, and were abolished at St Andrews following discussions at the Royal Commission on the Universities of Scotland, which later led to the Universities (Scotland) Acts.

Student nations continued into modern times at the University of Aberdeen and the University of Glasgow for the specific purpose of electing a Rector of the university.

== St Andrews ==
The University of St Andrews, in common with continental universities at the time of its founding, was divided into nations each presided over by a Procurator. The four nations were originally "Albany", "Angus", "Lothian", and "Britain", covering approximately northwest, northeast, southeast and southwest Scotland respectively. Later, the original Albany was renamed "Fife", while Britain became "Albany" and included the Western Isles and all places outside Scotland.

The four nations each chose an “intrant”, who in turn chose the Lord Rector. At that time the duties of Rector were similar to those of the Principal of the university today. In case of a tie, the decision was left to the outgoing Lord Rector.

The use of the nations system for rectorial elections was discontinued after the national establishment of elected Rectors under the Universities (Scotland) Act 1858.

== Glasgow ==
At the University of Glasgow the use of nations continued until 1977 for the election of the university's Lord Rector. The University has four nations, originally called Clydesdale, Teviotdale, Albany and Rothesay, and later as Clydesdale (Glottiana), Lothian (Loudonian), Transforthana ('beyond the Forth', essentially Albany) and Rothesay (Rothseiana). Respectively, their heraldic symbols are: a two-headed bird over crossed tools, an anchor over crossed tools, a horn over crossed tools and a sailing ship over crossed tools.

Three of the 'nations' consisted of defined areas in Scotland, with Transforthana consisting of students from all other places. The heraldic symbols of the nations can be seen in the stonework of a number of university buildings, including the Glasgow University Union and the chapel, under the Latin title of the university.

== Aberdeen ==
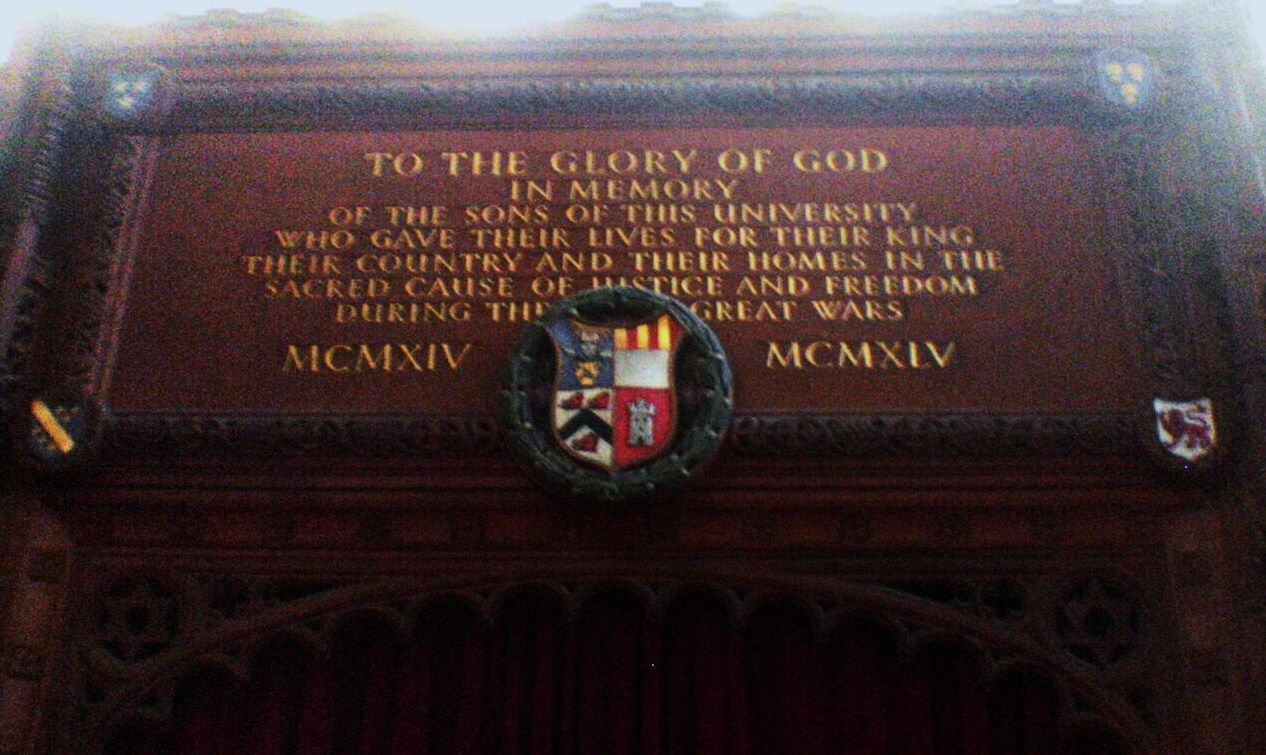
Plaque depicting the arms of the University of Aberdeen and its four nations (in each corner) in King's College Chapel.

The University of Aberdeen also had a system of nations. Following the Universities (Scotland) Act 1858, the use of nations to elect the Lord Rector continued via the election of Procurators, similar to the system used at the University of Glasgow, with the Chancellor having deciding vote in case of a tie. The four nations of the University were Angus, Mar ("Marriensis"), Buchan ("Buchanensis") and Moray ("Moraviensis").

Prior to the 1858 Act, Glasgow and Marischal College, one of Aberdeen's predecessor universities, were alone in making provision via the nations for election of a Rector.
