= Patrick Sharp (theologian) =

Scottish theologian and Principal of the University of Glasgow

Patrick Sharp (died 1615) was a Scottish theologian and Principal of the University of Glasgow.

== Life ==
He was made master of Glasgow grammar school in 1574. Soon after 1575 he was appointed one of a commission of classical scholars to draw up a new Latin grammar for use in the Scottish schools. In 1585 James VI appointed him Principal of the University of Glasgow. From this time he took an important part in the government and controversies of the Scottish church, He seems to have wished to preserve a position of neutrality between the two parties which divided the kirk, but he gradually inclined to the king's party.

In 1586 he was placed on a commission charged by the general assembly to control the proceedings of the bishops. In 1596 the general assembly appointed him and fifteen others to organise the church in opposition to the government. Consequently, he was ordered by the privy council to return to Glasgow. But in the same year he took part in the reactionary general assembly at Perth, and in 1597 he formed part of the commission to whom were delegated the powers of the general assembly when that body was not in session, and whose appointment paved the way for the re-establishment of episcopacy.

In 1606 Sharp was summoned to Hampton Court with seven other divines, to support the king's side in a debate with Andrew Melville and seven strong presbyterians, on the general questions at issue between king and kirk. In the same year he was appointed constant moderator to the Glasgow presbytery in the absence of the bishop, and encountered such opposition that the privy council ordered the presbytery to receive him under pain of rebellion. The following year he was rebuked for endeavoring to extend the judicial powers of the presbytery to the decision of criminal cases. In 1609 Sharp took part in the Falkland conference, which was intended to make matters easy for the bishops at the general assembly. On 15 May 1610 he was appointed to the Scottish court of high commission, and held the office till 11 August 1614.

He died in May 1615, having been twice married: first, to Mary Fowlls, widow of John Houlden of Balwill, on 1 September 1593, by whom he had two sons, David and Christian, and two daughters; and, secondly, to Elizabeth, daughter of Thomas Gale of Eastwood, by whom he had a son James.

Sharp was the teacher of John Cameron. Only one of his works survives, Doctrinae Christianae brevis explicatio, printed by Robert Waldegrave in Edinburgh in 1599.

Academic offices
Preceded by Thomas Smeaton	Principal of the University of Glasgow; 1586–1614	Succeeded by Robert Boyd
