= Thomas Turnbull (moderator) =

Scottish minister

Thomas Turnbull (1701–1786) was an 18th century Scottish minister who served as Moderator of the General Assembly of the Church of Scotland in 1758.

== Life ==
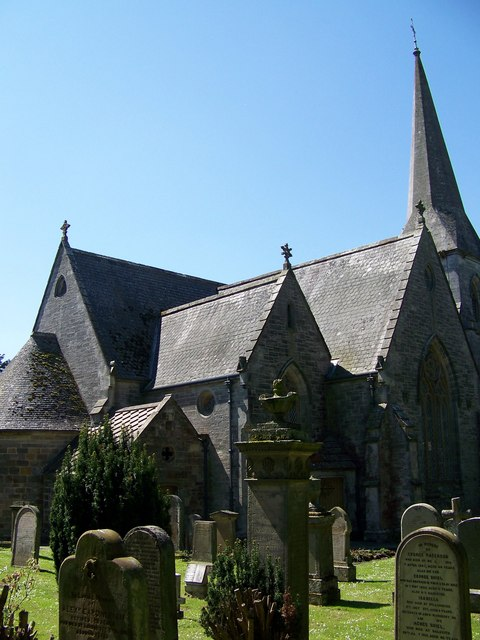
Borthwick Church

Turnbull was born in the manse in Tyninghame in East Lothian on 27 September 1701 the son of George Turnbull, the parish minister. He was licensed to preach by the Presbytery of Dunbar in March 1724. He was ordained as minister of Greenlaw in August 1725. In June 1734, he translated to the historic Borthwick Parish Church and remained minister of the parish for 52 years.

In 1758, Turnbull succeeded the William Leechman as Moderator of the General Assembly of the Church of Scotland, the highest position in the Scottish Church. He was succeeded in turn by George Kay.

Turnbull died in Borthwick manse on 23 March 1786. He was succeeded by James Finlayson.

== Family ==
In November 1726, Turnbull married Margaret Stevenson daughter of Hugh Stevenson of Montgrenan. They had five children.
