= John Adamson (minister) =

Scottish minister

John Adamson (1742–1808) was a Scottish Minister and Moderator of the General Assembly of the Church of Scotland in 1797.

== Life ==
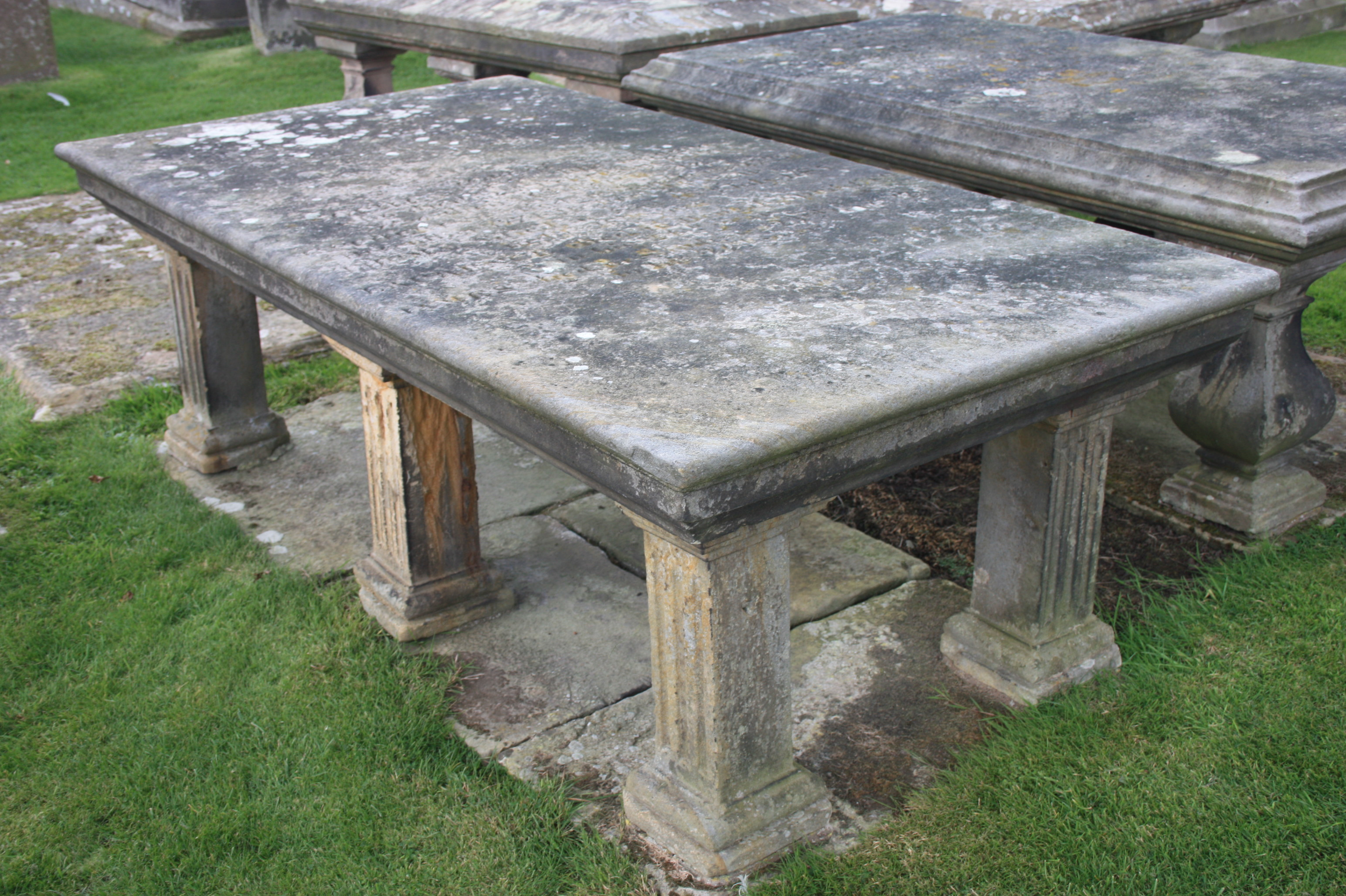
The grave of Very Rev John Adamson, St Andrews Cathedral graveyard

He was the son of Lawrence Adamson, Schoolmaster of Leuchars. He was educated in St Andrews University where he received the degree of M.A. in 1757. He was licensed to preach the gospel by the Presbytery of St Andrews on 2 March 1753, but it was not until 1764 that he was ordained as Minister of Kilmany. Eight years later, in 1772 he transferred to the more lucrative post as Minister of the Second Charge of St Andrews. He also became Professor of Civil History in the United College in the University there. He was awarded a Doctorate in Divinity by his University in 1777. Two years later, in 1779 he transferred to the even more lucrative First Charge of St Andrews. He was technically presented to this charge by King George III, but in fact by Henry Dundas, who exercised the royal patronage in Scotland. He was elected Moderator of the General Assembly of the Church of Scotland on 18 May 1797. This was during the French Revolutionary Wars and the Government in Britain feared political agitation, so the General Assembly was anxious to demonstrate its loyalty and devotion. It voted an address to the King, signed by John Adamson, Moderator, which they assured him that

They continue to feel and to act as becomes Britons, ready to sacrifice every private consideration in behalf of their beloved Sovereign, of the independence of their country, and of their religion and liberties.While our people patiently and cheerfully endure the inevitable toils and burdens of a war, they join with us in cherishing the pleasing hope of peace, when peace can be obtained on terms fair and honourable, such as will give full security for the many blessings by which your Majesty's subjects are distinguished. For the attainment of which most desirable object, we rely, under God, with the most entire confidence on the wisdom and vigour of your Majesty's councils.

He died of "an apoplexy" after preaching on 21 August 1808. His table form grave lies close to St Rule's Tower in the graveyard of St Andrews Cathedral.

== Family ==
On 4 July 1765 he married Sophie Kay, daughter of Thomas Kay, Minister of Kilmany, and had a large family.

== Publications ==
- A Sermon preached on the anniversary of the Revolution 1789 (i.e. the Glorious Revolution)
- Statistical Account of Scotland, Parish, Vol XIII p 187 et seq, Report on the Parishes of St Andrews and St Leonards, Edinburgh 1792

== Sources ==
- Scott, Hew 'Fasti ecclesiæ scoticanæ; the succession of ministers in the Church of Scotland from the reformation' Volume 5: synods of Fife, and of Angus and Mearns, pp 161, 235, 249 Edinburgh 1915
- Acts of the General Assembly of the Church of Scotland 1638-1842, Church Law Society, Edinburgh, 1843. (British History Online
- Grierson, James Delineations of St. Andrews: being a particular account of every thing remarkable in .....(page 188) P Hill, Edinburgh 1807

== See also ==
- List of moderators of the General Assembly of the Church of Scotland

Church of Scotland titles
| Preceded by William Greenfield | Moderator of the General Assembly of the Church of Scotland; 1797 | Succeeded by William Taylor |
