= Robert Herbert Story =

Scottish divine

Robert Story
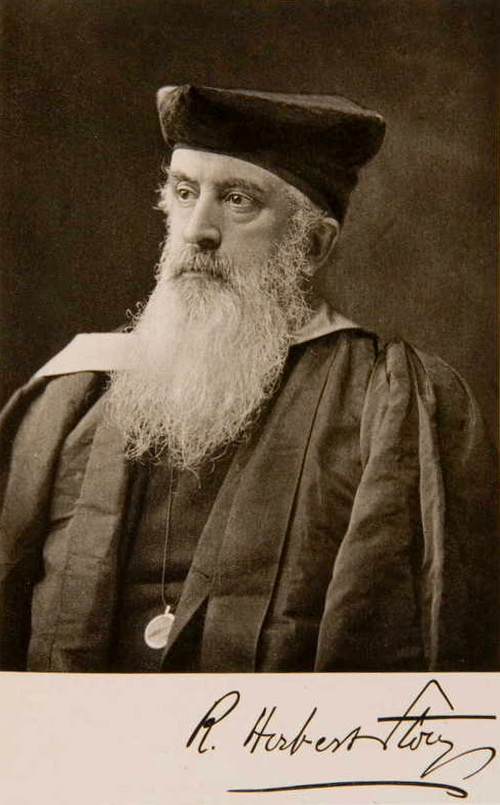

Principal of the University of Glasgow
- In office 1898–1907
- Preceded by: John Caird
- Succeeded by: Sir Donald MacAlister

Personal details
- Born: 28 January 1835 Rosneath, Dunbartonshire
- Died: 13 January 1907 (aged 71)
- Education: Edinburgh, St Andrews and Heidelberg

Robert Herbert Story (28 January 1835 – 13 January 1907) was a Scottish divine and Principal of the University of Glasgow. He attained the highest position in the Scottish church as Moderator of the General Assembly of the Church of Scotland in 1894.

== Biography ==
Story was born on 28 January 1835 at the manse at Rosneath, Dunbartonshire, the son of Rev Robert Story, the parish minister.

He was educated at the universities of Edinburgh, St Andrews and Heidelberg. In November 1858 he was licensed to preach as a Church of Scotland minister by the Presbytery of Dumbarton. He was then sent to Canada to improve the Church of Scotland's presence there. In 1859, he was assistant minister at St Andrew's Church, Montreal, but in February 1860 returned to Scotland when he was inducted as minister of his home town of Rosneath in succession to his father.

Edinburgh University awarded him a Doctor of Divinity in 1874. He was appointed Junior Clerk of the General Assembly in 1886. From 1885 to 1889 he was Editor of the Scots Magazine.

In November 1886, he moved to Glasgow University as Professor of Church History. In 1898, he became principal of the university, succeeding John Caird. He was moderator of the General Assembly of the Church of Scotland in 1894, and its Principal Clerk from that year until his death on 13 January 1907.

Story had been appointed in 1886 as Chaplain in Ordinary to Queen Victoria, and was also Chaplain-in-Ordinary in Scotland to King Edward VII following Victoria's death. Story was appointed Honorary Chaplain to the Clyde Brigade of the Royal Naval Artillery Volunteers in 1896., and to the Royal Naval Volunteer Reserve in 1904.

He received an honorary doctorate as Doctor of Laws (LL.D.) from the University of St Andrews in 1900.

He lived his final years in rooms at the university (13 University) and died in Glasgow on 13 January 1907. His position as principal was filled by Sir Donald MacAlister.

== Family ==
In October 1863 he married the author Janet Leith Maughan (d. 1926), daughter of Captain Philip Maughan. They had a son, who died in infancy and two daughters.

== Trivia ==
John Anderson, the eighteenth-century pioneer of vocational education and Professor of Natural Philosophy at Glasgow, was also born in Rosneath and the son of the minister of the parish church.

== Character ==
Story was a staunch supporter of the Church of Scotland, and had little sympathy for schemes of reunion with the other Presbyterian communities. He vigorously opposed the action of Bishop Welldon, then metropolitan of Calcutta, in excluding Scottish chaplains and troops from the use of garrison churches in India because these had not received episcopal consecration. He was characterized by an absolutely fearless honesty, which sometimes gave offence, but at the basis of his nature there was a warm, tender and sympathetic heart, incapable of meanness or intrigue.

== Works ==
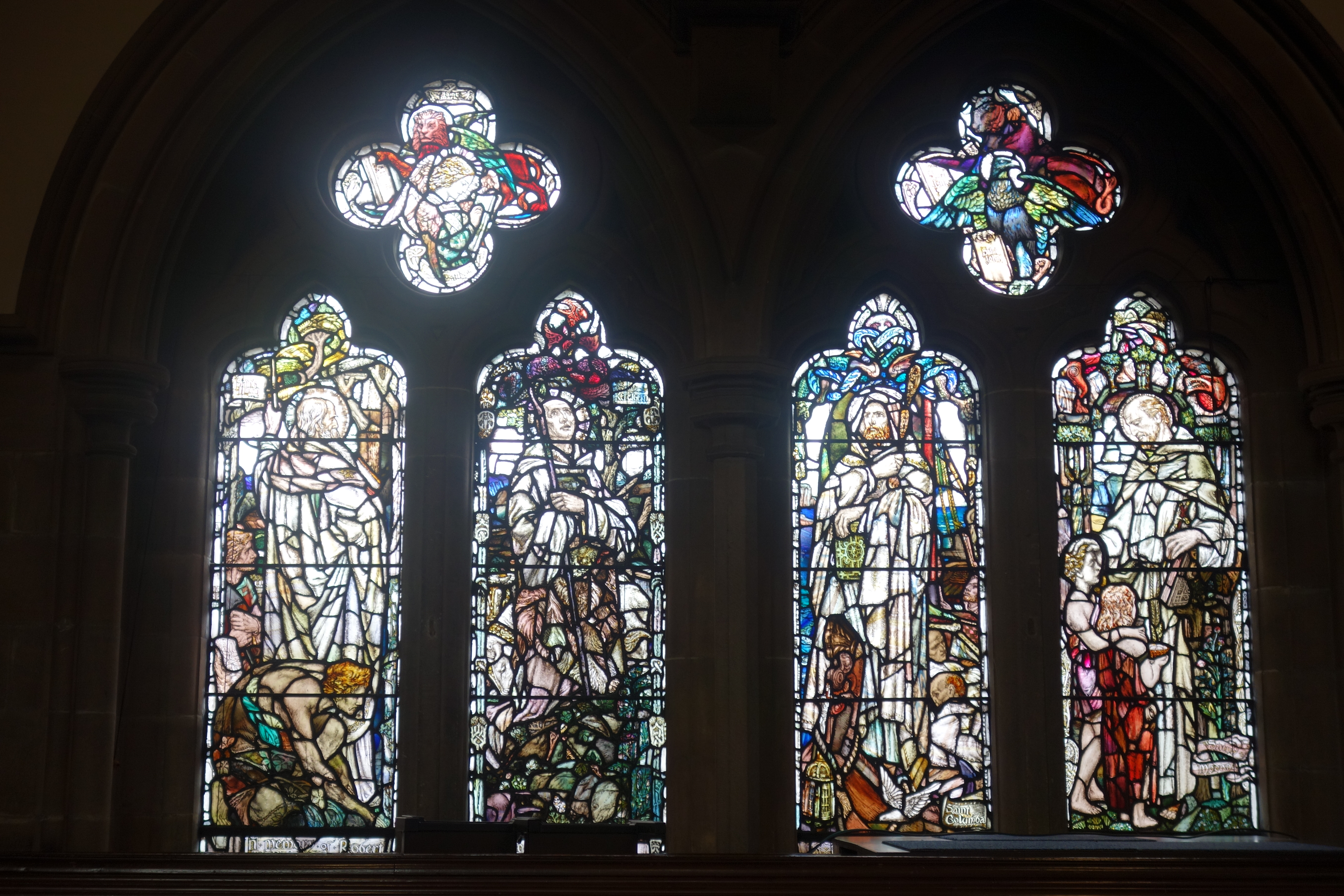
Robert Story Memorial Window by Douglas Strachan, in the Bute Hall of Glasgow University

In addition to lives of his father (1862), Professor Robert Lee (1870) and William Carstares (1876), he published a devotional book Christ the Consoler; a volume of sermons, Creed and Conduct (1878); The Apostolic Ministry in the Scottish Church (Baird Lecture, 1897), and several pamphlets on church questions.

Is magnum opus was The Church of Scotland, Past and Present 5.vols. (1890/1)

Academic offices
Preceded by Professor John Caird	Principal and Vice-Chancellor of the University of Glasgow; 1873 to 1898	Succeeded by Sir Donald MacAlister
