= Professor of Divinity and Biblical Criticism =

The Professorship of Divinity and Biblical Criticism at the University of Glasgow was founded in 1861. The patron was formerly the Crown (i.e. a Regius Professorship). Since 1935, the University Court, acting on the recommendation of a Board of Nomination consisting of representatives of the University Court and of the General Assembly of the Church of Scotland, appoints the Professor.

== (Regius) Professors of Divinity and Biblical Criticism ==
- William Purdie Dickson MA LLD DD (1863)
- William Stuart MA LLD DD (1873)
- George Milligan MA DCL DD (1910)
- George Hogarth Carnaby MacGregor MA DLitt DD (1933)
- William Barclay CBE MA BD DD (1963)
- Ernest Best MA BD PhD DD (1974–1982)
- John Riches MA (1991)

== See also ==
- List of Professorships at the University of Glasgow
