= John Caird (theologian) =

Scottish theologian (1820–1898)

The Very Reverend John Caird FRSE
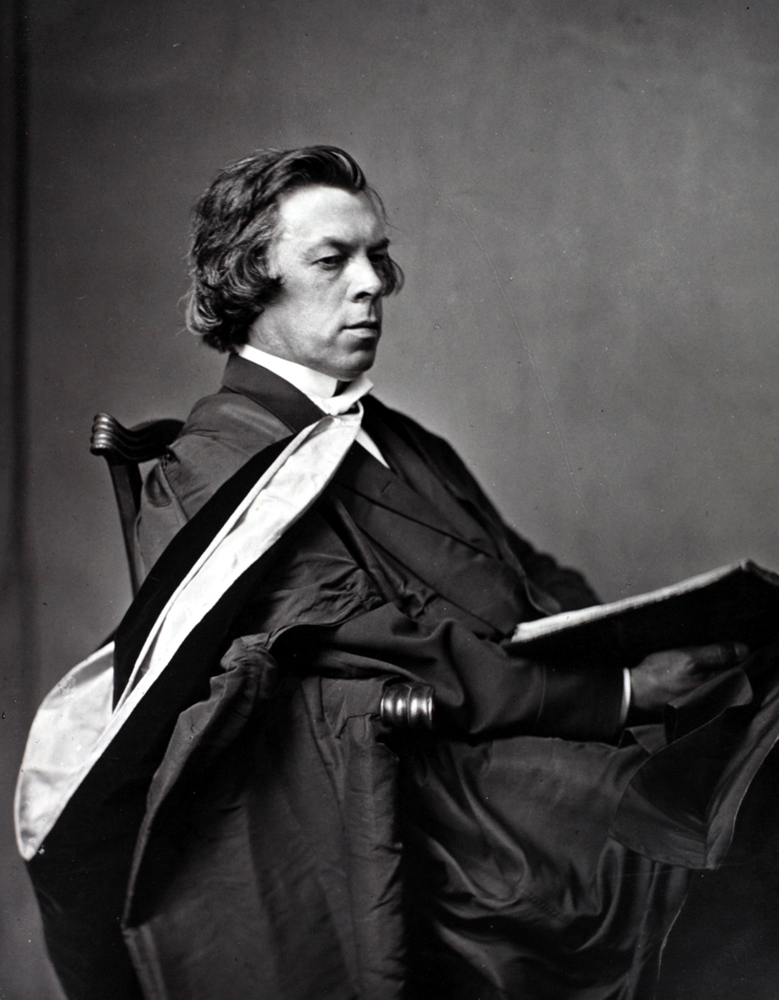
- Born: 15 December 1820; Greenock, Scotland
- Died: 30 July 1898 (aged 77); Greenock, Scotland
- Office: Principal of the University of Glasgow (1873–1898)
- Spouse: Isabella Glover (m. 1858)
- Relatives: Edward Caird (brother)

Ecclesiastical career
- Religion: Christianity (Presbyterian)
- Church: Church of Scotland
- Ordained: 1845

Academic background
- Education: University of Glasgow
- Influences: G. W. F. Hegel

Academic work
- Discipline: Theology
- School or tradition: British idealism
- Institutions: University of Glasgow
- Notable works: An Introduction to the Philosophy of Religion (1880)
- Influenced: Bernard Bosanquet; John Watson

John Caird (Note: Pronounced /kɛərd/.) (1820–1898) was a Scottish theologian. He entered the Church of Scotland, of which he became one of the most eloquent preachers. He served as the Principal of the University of Glasgow from 1873 until 1898.

== Life ==
He was born at 24 Nicholson Street in Greenock on 15 December 1820, the son of John Caird of Caird and Co. and Janet Young. His younger brother was Edward Caird.

He was educated at Greenock Grammar School, and then attended the University of Glasgow graduating MA in 1845. He spent some time as a missionary in Ardentinny before being licensed to preach as a Church of Scotland minister by the Presbytery of Glasgow in 1845.

In September 1845 he was ordained as minister at Newton-on-Ayr, translating to Lady Yester's Church in Edinburgh in May 1847, and to Errol, Perthshire in July 1849. Caird was transferred to Park Church, Glasgow in 1857, being appointed Chaplain in Ordinary to Queen Victoria in the same year.

In 1862 he became Professor of Divinity at the University of Glasgow, and, in 1873 following the death of Thomas Barclay, became Principal of the university, a post which he then held for 26 years, until 1898.

The University of Glasgow made him a Doctor of Divinity in 1860 and St Andrews University awarded him an honorary Doctor of Laws in 1863. Edinburgh gave him a second DD doctorate in 1884.

A sermon on Religion in Common Life, preached before Queen Victoria, made him known throughout the Protestant world. He wrote An Introduction to the Philosophy of Religion (1880), and Spinoza (1888).

Caird delivered the 1892–1896 Gifford Lectures at the University of Glasgow, entitled The Fundamental Ideas of Christianity.

In 1897 he was elected an Honorary Fellow of the Royal Society of Edinburgh.

He died on 30 July 1898 in Greenock and is buried in Greenock Cemetery. His position as Principal was filled by Robert Herbert Story.

== Family ==
In June 1858 he married Isabella Riddle Glover, daughter of Rev Dr William Glover of Greenside. They had no children.

== Publications ==
- Religion in Common Life (1855)
- The Fundamental Ideas of Christianity 2 vols. (1899)

== Notes ==
Academic offices
| Preceded by Alexander Hill | Professor of Divinity at the University of Glasgow; 1862– | Succeeded by William Purdie Dickson |
| Preceded by Thomas Barclay | Principal and Vice-Chancellor of the University of Glasgow; 1873–1898 | Succeeded by Robert Story |
| Preceded by Max Müller | Gifford Lecturer at the University of Glasgow; 1892–1896 | Succeeded by Alexander Balmain Bruce |
