= Principal of the University of Glasgow =

The Principal of the University of Glasgow is the working head of the University, acting as its chief executive. They are responsible for the day-to-day management of the university as well as its strategic planning and administration. The Principal is appointed by the University Court and is President of the Senate, the university's supreme academic body. The Principal is normally also created Vice-Chancellor of the university, conferring on them the degree-awarding powers of the Chancellor.

Professor Andy Schofield succeeded Sir Anton Muscatelli as Principal on 1 October 2025

== History ==
From around the foundation of the university in the 15th century there existed the office of the Principal Regent, who was the senior regent of the university, with jurisdiction over the other regents and the students and responsible for day-to-day administration of the college. This office developed over the years, most notably through the Universities (Scotland) Acts, although the Principal remains the chief academic officer of the university, President of the Senate, and is permitted to award degrees by virtue of their status as Vice-Chancellor. Although the office of Principal is an academic post, the Principal is not always an academic, as was the case with Sir William Kerr Fraser and Sir Muir Russell.

== List of principals and vice-chancellors ==
- 1460 – Duncan Bunch
- 1475 – Walter Bunch
- 1478 – John Goldsmith
- 1478 – John Doby
- 1480 – John Brown
- 1483 – Walter Leslie
- 1485 – George Crichton
- 1488 – John Goldsmith
- 1489 – John Doby
- 1498 – Patrick Coventry
- 1510 – Thomas Coutts
- 1514 – David Melville
- 1517 – David Abercromby
- 1518 – John Mair
- 1523 – James Lindsay
- 1527 – Alexander Logan
- 1540 – Alexander Hamilton
- 1547 – John Hamilton
- 1555 – John Houston
- 1556 – John Davidson
- 1574 – Andrew Melville
- 1580 – Thomas Smeaton
- 1585 – Patrick Sharp
- 1615 – Robert Boyd
- 1622 – John Cameron
- 1626 – John Strang
- 1651 – Robert Ramsay
- 1653 – Patrick Gillespie
- 1660 – Robert Baillie
- 1662 – Edward Wright
- 1684 – James Fall
- 1690 – William Dunlop
- 1701 – John Stirling
- 1728 – Neil Campbell
- 1761 – William Leechman
- 1785 – Archibald Davidson
- 1803 – William Taylor
- 1823 – Duncan Macfarlan
- 1858 – Thomas Barclay
- 1873 – John Caird*
- 1898 – Robert Story
- 1909 – Sir Donald MacAlister
- 1929 – Sir Robert Sangster Rait
- 1936 – Sir Hector Hetherington*
- 1961 – Sir Charles Wilson*
- 1976 – Sir Alwyn Williams
- 1988 – Sir William Kerr Fraser*
- 1995 – Sir Graeme Davies
- 2003 – Sir Muir Russell*
- 2009 – Sir Anton Muscatelli*
- 2025 – Andy Schofield

(*) = denotes alumnus

== See also ==
- Principal (university)
- Chancellor of the University of Glasgow
- Rector of the University of Glasgow
- Ancient university governance in Scotland

== Resources ==
- Reid, Henry Martin Beckwith (1917). The divinity principals in the University of Glasgow. Glasgow: J. Maclehose. pp. 1-82.
- "University of Glasgow :: Story :: The Principal". University Story. University of Glasgow.
