= Christopher Magnay =

Christopher Magnay may refer to:

- Christopher Magnay (lord mayor) (1767–1826), English merchant, Lord Mayor of London, 1821–22
- Sir Christopher Magnay, 3rd Baronet (1884–1960), English cricketer
