= Magnay =

Magnay is a surname. Notable people with the surname include:

- Carl Magnay (born 1889), English footballer
- Christopher Magnay (lord mayor) (1767–1826), Lord Mayor of London in 1821
- Claude Magnay (1819–1870), English clergyman, writer and cricketer
- Thomas Magnay (1876–1949), English politician
- William Magnay (disambiguation)
