= William Magnay =

William Magnay may refer to:

- Sir William Magnay, 1st Baronet, Lord Mayor of London
- Sir William Magnay, 2nd Baronet, novelist
