= Claude Magnay =

English clergyman and cricketer

Claudius Stephen Magnay (8 May 1819 – 17 December 1870), known as Claude, was an English clergyman, a writer, and a cricketer who played first-class cricket in a single match for Cambridge University in 1841. He was born at Clapham, London and died at Bedford.

Magnay was the son of Christopher Magnay who was Lord Mayor of London in 1821-22 and the brother of Sir William Magnay, 1st Baronet, who was Lord Mayor in 1843. He was educated at Elizabeth College, Guernsey and at Clare College, Cambridge. While at Cambridge University, he made a single appearance for the university cricket team in a match at Lord's against Marylebone Cricket Club; he batted at No 11 and failed to score in either innings, being not out once. The scorecard for the match is incomplete and it is not known if he bowled.

After graduating from Cambridge, Magnay was ordained as a clergyman in the Church of England; he was curate at parishes in Hampshire, Dorset and, from 1857 to his death in 1870, at Hemyock in Devon. He was also a published author and poet; among his books is a novel, Reginald Græme, or Visible and Invisible.
