= University of Glasgow =

Public university in Glasgow, Scotland

Coordinates: 55°52′19″N 4°17′15″W

- Scottish Gaelic: Oilthigh Ghlaschu
- Coat of arms
- Latin: Universitas Glasguensis
- Motto: Latin: Via, Veritas, Vita
- Motto in English: The Way, The Truth, The Life
- Type: Public research university Ancient university
- Established: 7 January 1451; 575 years ago
- Academic affiliations: ACU; EUA; The Guild; PEGASUS; Russell Group; UArctic; Universitas 21; Universities Scotland; Universities UK; Defence Universities Alliance
- Endowment: £283.1 million (2025)
- Budget: £1.055 billion (2024/25)
- Chancellor: The Baroness Grainger
- Rector: Ghassan Abu-Sittah
- Principal and Vice-Chancellor: Andy Schofield
- Academic staff: 5,870 (2024/25)
- Administrative staff: 4,895 (2024/25)
- Students: 38,710 (2024/25); 34,500 FTE (2024/25)
- Undergraduates: 24,300 (2024/25)
- Postgraduates: 14,410 (2024/25)
- Location: Glasgow, Scotland, UK
- Flag
Colours
More
- Arts
  Dentistry
  Divinity
  Engineering
  Law
  Medicine
  Nursing
  Science
  Social Sciences
  Veterinary Medicine
- Website: gla.ac.uk

The University of Glasgow (abbreviated as Glas. in post-nominals; Scottish Gaelic: Oilthigh Ghlaschu) is a public research university in Glasgow, Scotland. Founded by papal bull in 1451 [O.S. 1450], it is the fourth-oldest university in the English-speaking world and one of Scotland's four ancient universities. Along with the universities of St Andrews, Aberdeen, and Edinburgh, the university was part of the Scottish Enlightenment during the 18th century. Glasgow is the second largest university in Scotland by total enrolment and 8th-largest in the United Kingdom.

In common with universities of the pre-modern era, Glasgow originally educated students primarily from wealthy backgrounds; however, it became a pioneer in British higher education in the 19th century by also providing for the needs of students from the growing urban and commercial middle class. Glasgow University served all of these students by preparing them for professions: law, medicine, civil service, teaching, and the church. It also trained smaller but growing numbers for careers in science and engineering.

Glasgow has the fifth-largest endowment of any university in the UK and the annual income of the institution for 2024–25 was £1.05 billion of which £241.1 million was from research grants and contracts, with an expenditure of £982.8 million. It is a member of Universitas 21, the Russell Group and the Guild of European Research-Intensive Universities.

The university was originally located in the city's High Street; since 1870, its main campus has been at Gilmorehill in the City's West End. Additionally, a number of university buildings are located elsewhere, such as the Veterinary School in Bearsden, and the Crichton Campus in Dumfries.

The alumni of the University of Glasgow include some of the major figures of modern history, including James Wilson, a signatory of the United States Declaration of Independence, 3 Prime Ministers of the United Kingdom (William Lamb, Henry Campbell-Bannerman and Bonar Law), 3 Scottish First Ministers (Humza Yousaf, Nicola Sturgeon and Donald Dewar), economist Adam Smith, philosopher Francis Hutcheson, engineer James Watt, physicist Lord Kelvin, surgeon Joseph Lister along with 4 Nobel Prize laureates (in total 8 Nobel Prize winners are affiliated with the university) and numerous Olympic gold medallists, including the current chancellor, Dame Katherine Grainger.

== History ==
The University of Glasgow was founded in 1451 by a charter or papal bull from Pope Nicholas V, at the suggestion of King James II, giving Bishop William Turnbull, a graduate of the University of St Andrews, permission to add a university to the city's Cathedral. It is the second-oldest university in Scotland after St Andrews and the fourth-oldest in the English-speaking world. The universities of St Andrews, Glasgow, and Aberdeen were ecclesiastical foundations, while Edinburgh was a civic foundation. As one of the ancient universities of the United Kingdom, Glasgow is one of only eight institutions to award undergraduate master's degrees in certain disciplines.

The university has been without its original Bull since the mid-sixteenth century. In 1560, during the political unrest accompanying the Scottish Reformation, the then chancellor, Archbishop James Beaton, a supporter of the Marian cause, fled to France. He took with him, for safe-keeping, many of the archives and valuables of the cathedral and the university, including the Mace and the Bull. Although the Mace was sent back in 1590, the archives were not. Principal James Fall told the Parliamentary Commissioners of Visitation on 28 August 1690, that he had seen the Bull at the Scots College in Paris, together with the many charters granted to the university by the monarchs of Scotland from James II to Mary, Queen of Scots. The university enquired of these documents in 1738 but was informed by Thomas Innes and the superiors of the Scots College that the original records of the foundation of the university were not to be found. If they had not been lost by this time, they certainly went astray during the French Revolution when the Scots College was under threat. Its records and valuables were moved for safe-keeping out of the city of Paris. The Bull remains the authority by which the university awards degrees.

Teaching at the university began in the Chapter House of Glasgow Cathedral, subsequently moving to nearby Rottenrow, in a building known as the "Auld Pedagogy". The university was given 13 acres (5.3 ha) of land belonging to the Black Friars (Dominicans) on High Street by Mary, Queen of Scots, in 1563. By the late 17th century its building centred on two courtyards surrounded by walled gardens, with a clock tower, which was one of the notable features of Glasgow's skyline—reaching 140 feet (43 m) in height—and a chapel adapted from the church of the former Dominican (Blackfriars) friary. Remnants of this Scottish Renaissance building, mainly parts of the main façade, were transferred to the Gilmorehill campus and renamed as the "Pearce Lodge", after Sir William Pearce, the shipbuilding magnate who funded its preservation. The Lion and Unicorn Staircase was also transferred from the old college site and is now attached to the Main Building.

John Anderson, while professor of natural philosophy at the university, and with some opposition from his colleagues, pioneered vocational education for working men and women during the Industrial Revolution. To continue this work in his will, he founded Anderson's College, which was associated with the university before merging with other institutions to become the University of Strathclyde in 1964.

In 1973, Delphine Parrott became its first female professor, as Gardiner Professor of Immunology.

In October 2014, the university court voted for the university to become the first academic institution in Europe to divest from the fossil fuel industry. This followed a 12-month campaign led by the Glasgow University Climate Action Society and involved over 1,300 students.

== Campus ==
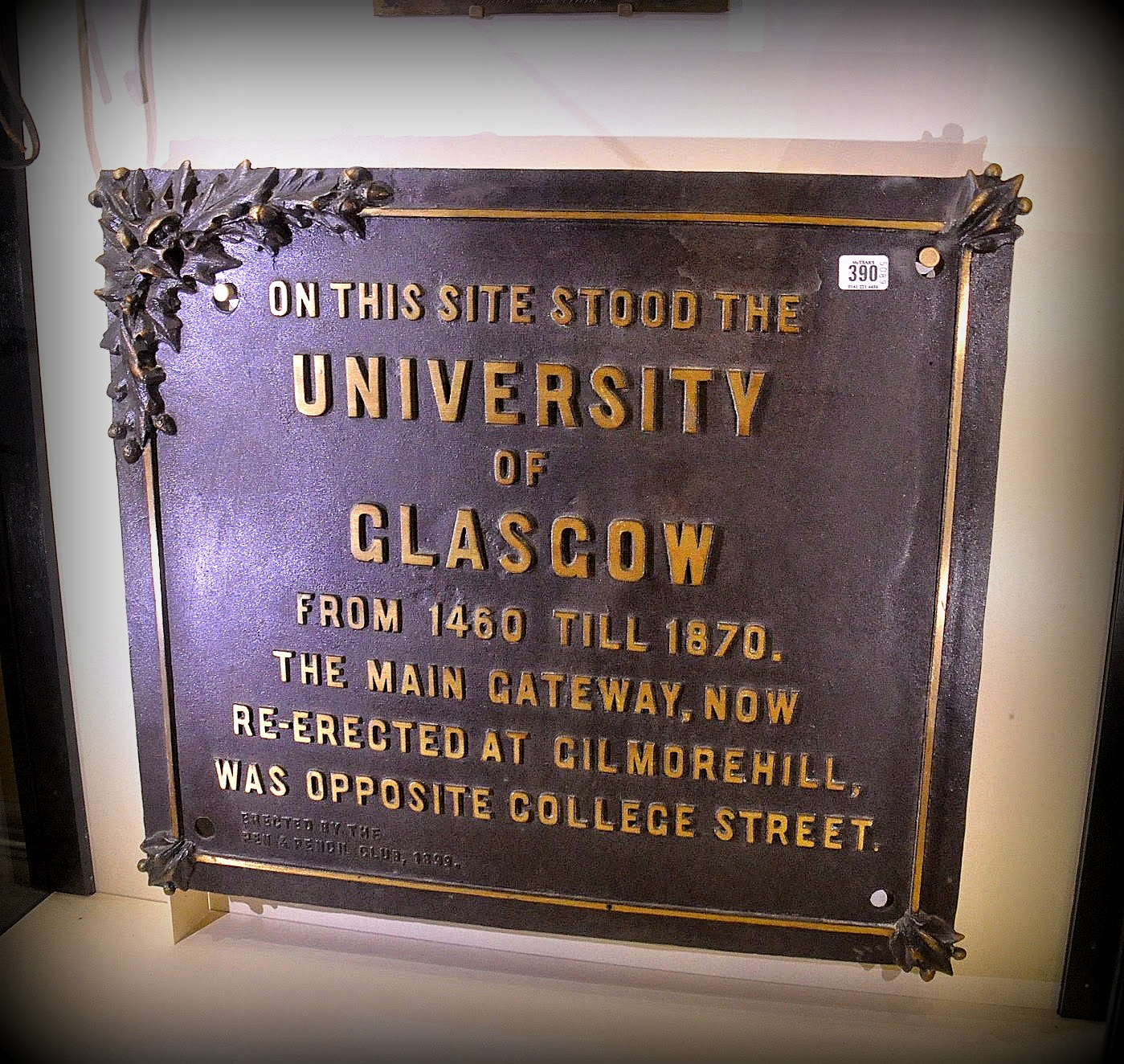
University of Glasgow, Older Building Sign

The university is currently spread over a few campuses. The main one is the Gilmorehill campus, in Hillhead. As well as this there is the Garscube Estate in Bearsden, housing the Veterinary School, Observatory, ship model basin and much of the university's sports facilities, the Dental School in the city center, the section of Mental Health and Well Being at Gartnavel Royal Hospital on Great Western Road, the Teaching and Learning Centre at the Queen Elizabeth University Hospital and the Crichton Campus in Dumfries (operated jointly by the University of Glasgow, the University of the West of Scotland and the Open University).

The Imaging Centre of Excellence (ICE) was opened at the Queen Elizabeth University Hospital on 29 March 2017, including a Clinical Innovation Zone spanning 11,000 square feet (1,000 m^{2}) of collaboration space for researchers and industry.

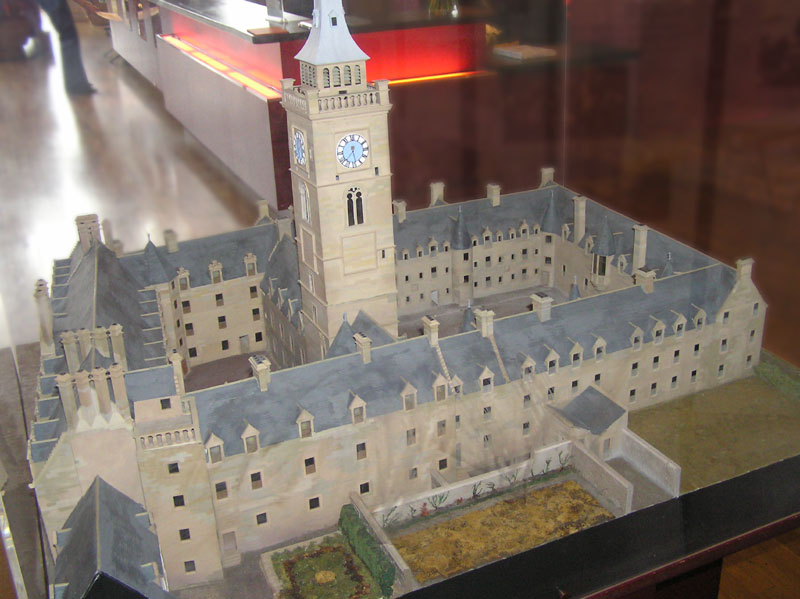
A model of the old High Street Building, in the Hunterian Museum

=== High Street ===
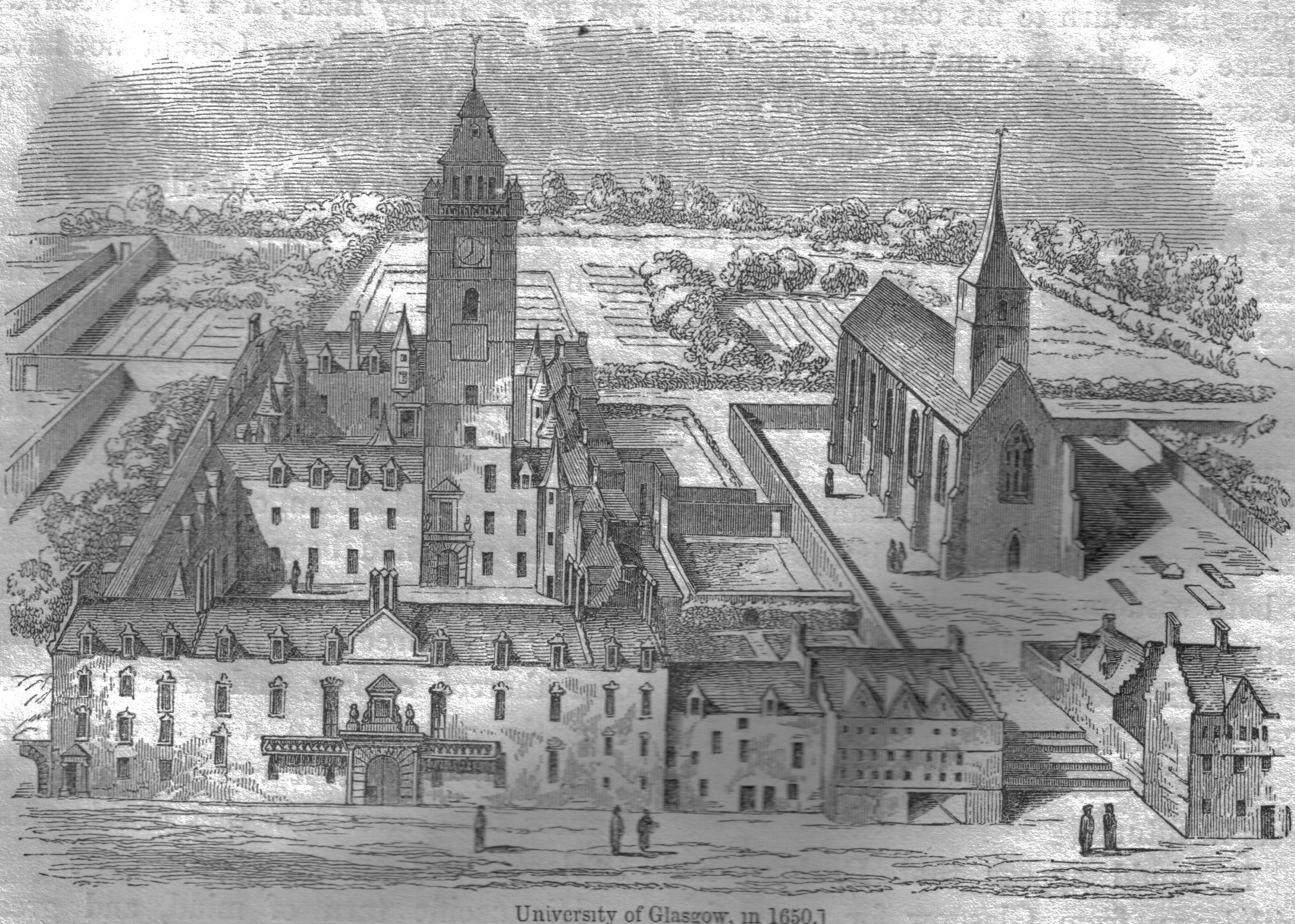
The University of Glasgow in 1650 on a 19th century engraving

The university's initial accommodation including Glasgow University Library was part of the complex of religious buildings in the precincts of Glasgow Cathedral. In 1460, the university received a grant of land from James, Lord Hamilton, on the east side of the High Street, immediately north of the Blackfriars Church, on which it had its home for the next four hundred years. In the mid-seventeenth century, the Hamilton Building was replaced with a very grand two-court building with a decorated west front facing the High Street, called the 'Nova Erectio', or New Building. This foundation is widely considered to have been one of the finest 17th-century buildings in Scotland. Decorated fragments from it, including a complete exterior stairway, were rescued and built into its 19th-century replacement. In Sir Walter Scott's best-selling 1817 novel Rob Roy, set at the time of the Jacobite rising of 1715, the lead character fights a duel in the New Building grounds before the contest is broken up by Rob Roy MacGregor.

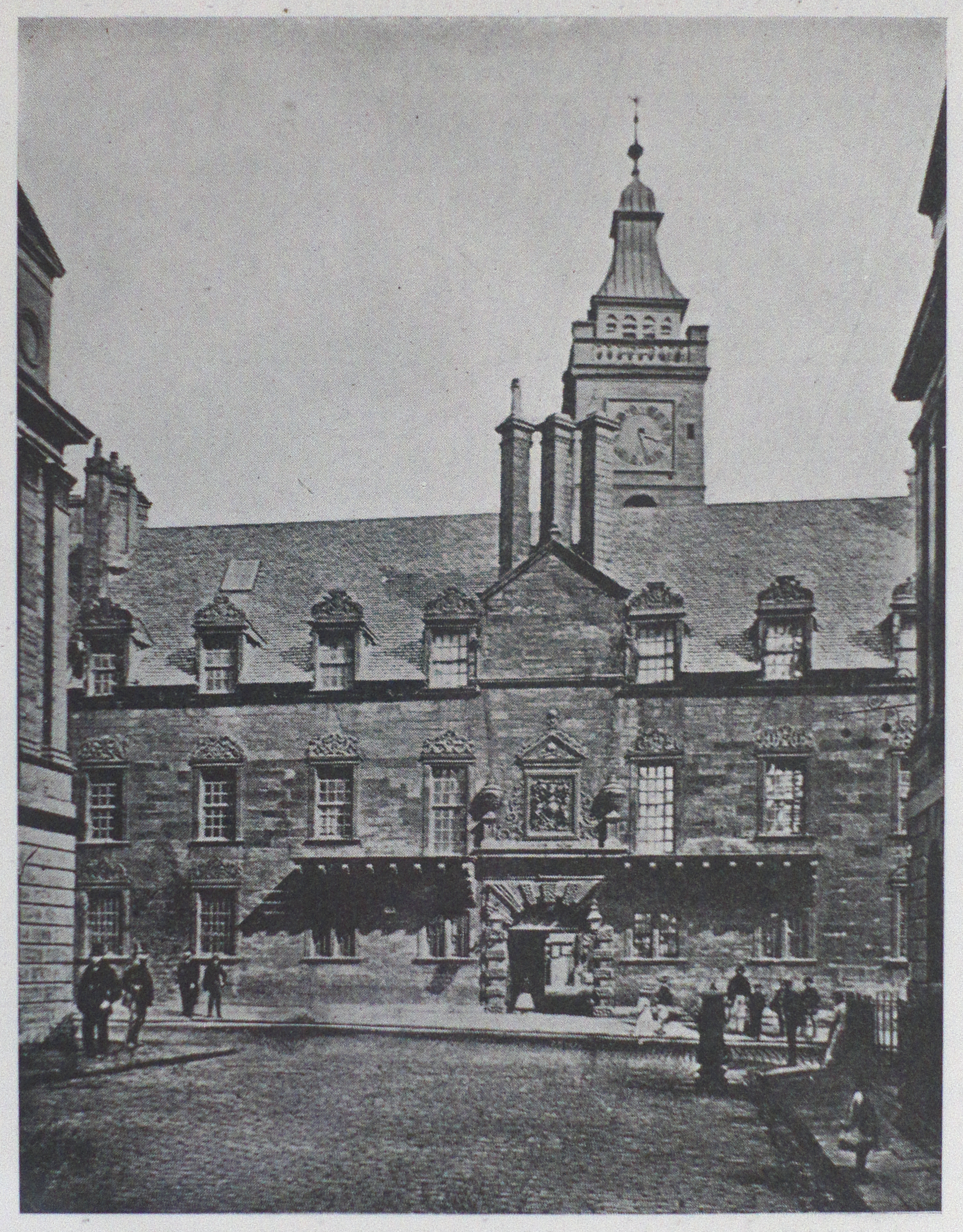
Front of The University of Glasgow on High Street, Glasgow, 1870. Original photograph by Thomas Annan and Richard Annan.

Over the following centuries, the university's size and scope continued to expand. In 1757 it built the Macfarlane Observatory and later Scotland's first public museum, the Hunterian. It was a center of the Scottish Enlightenment and subsequently of the Industrial Revolution, and its expansion in the High Street was constrained. The area around the university declined as well-off residents moved westwards with the expansion of the city and overcrowding of the immediate area by less well-off residents. It was this rapid slumming of the area that was a chief catalyst of the university's migration westward.

=== Gilmorehill ===
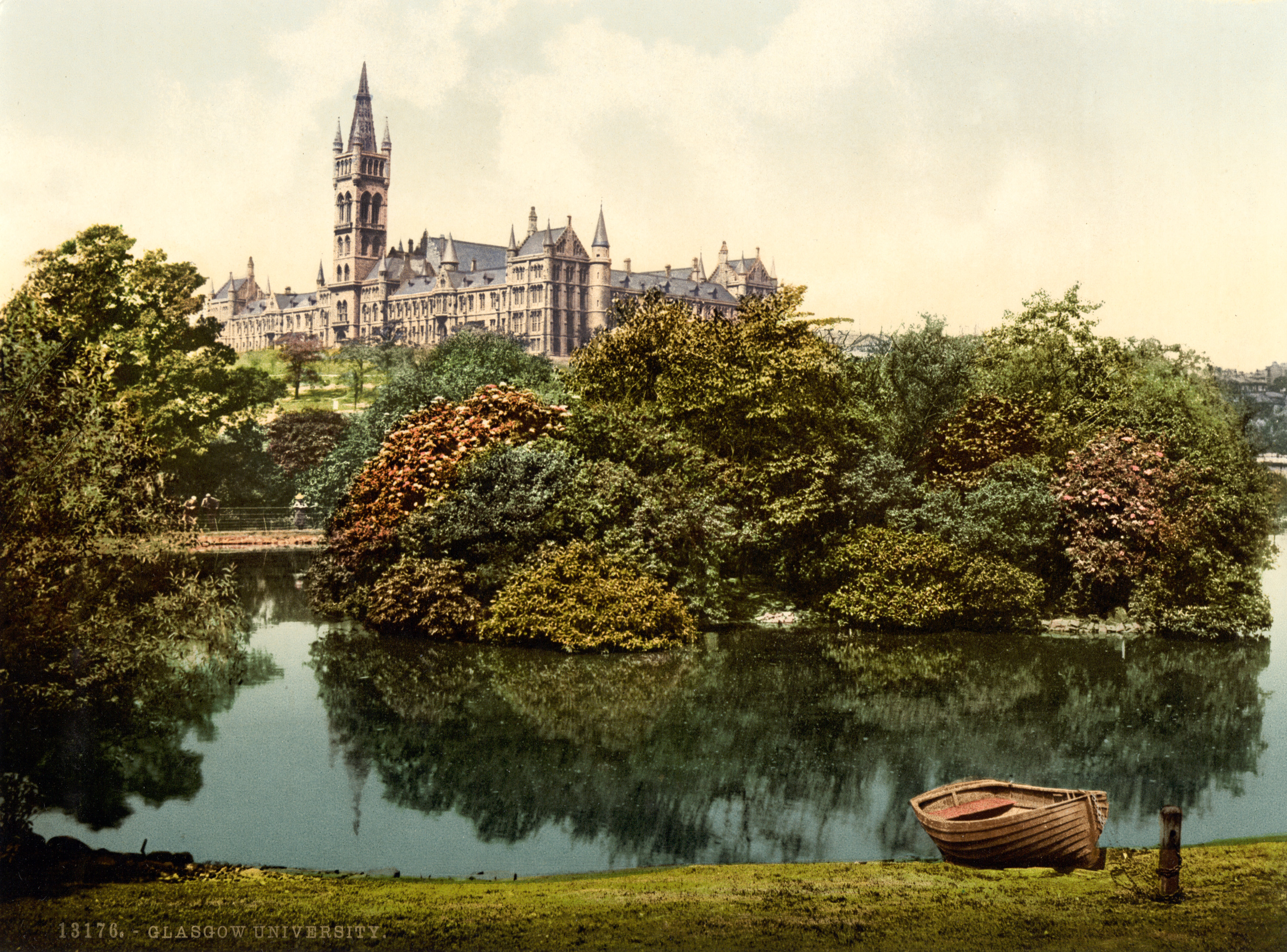
The new buildings of the University of Glasgow at Gilmorehill, circa 1895.

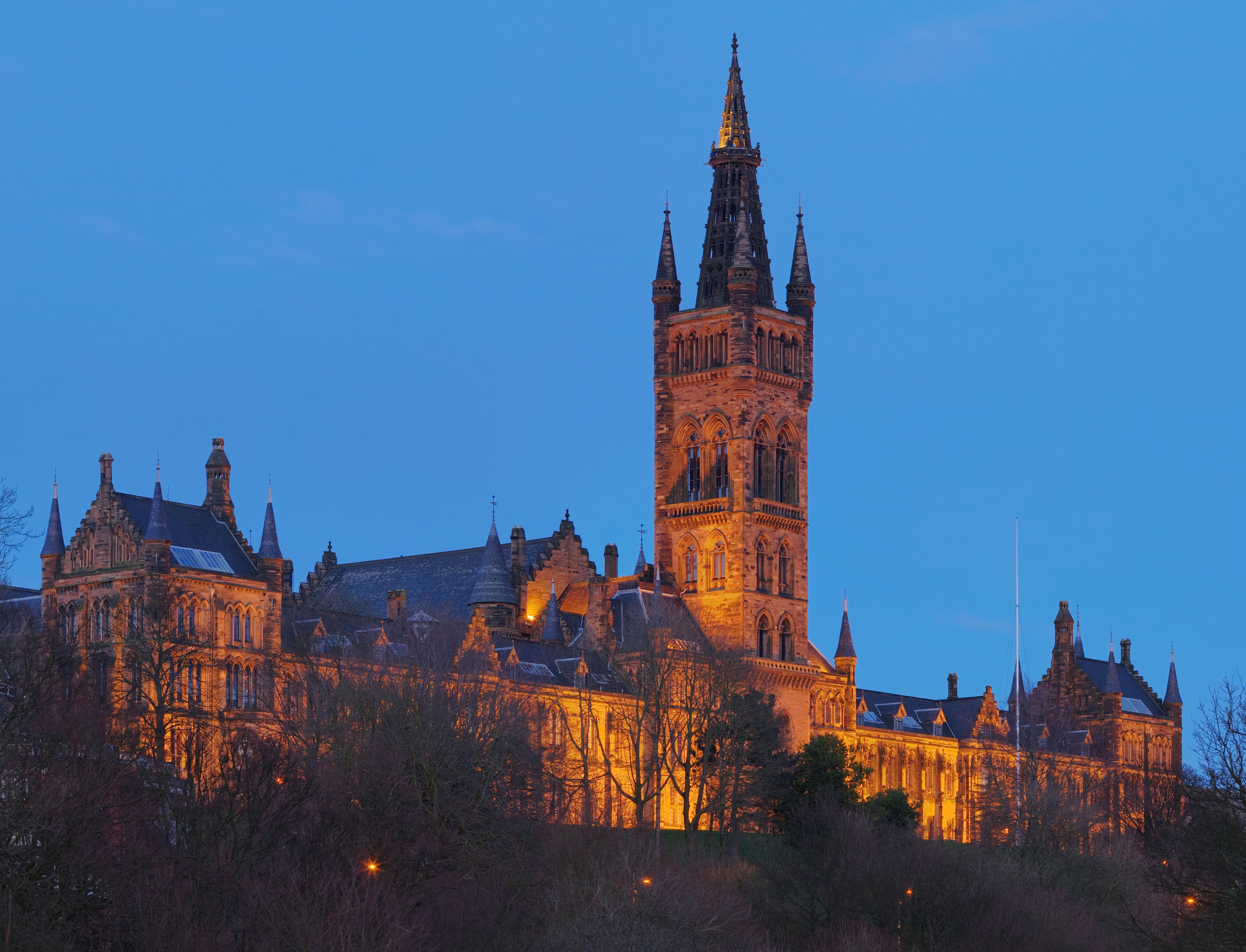
The night view of the university's main building

In 1870, the university moved to a (then greenfield) site on Gilmorehill in the West End of the city, around three miles (five kilometres) west of its previous location, enclosed by a large meander of the River Kelvin. The original site on the High Street was sold to the City of Glasgow Union Railway and replaced by the college goods yard. The new-build campus was designed by Sir George Gilbert Scott in the Gothic revival style. The largest of these buildings echoed, on a far grander scale, the original High Street campus's twin-quadrangle layout, and may have been inspired by Ypres' late-medieval cloth hall; Gilmorehill, in turn, inspired the design of the Clocktower complex of buildings for the new University of Otago in New Zealand. In 1879, Gilbert Scott's son, Oldrid, completed this original vision by building an open undercroft forming two quadrangles, above which is his grand Bute Hall (used for examinations and graduation ceremonies), named after its donor, John Crichton-Stuart, 3rd Marquess of Bute. Oldrid also later added a spire to the building's signature gothic bell tower in 1887, bringing it to a total height of some 85 metres (278 ft). The local Bishopbriggs blond sandstone cladding and Gothic design of the building's exterior belie the modernity of its Victorian construction; Scott's building is structured upon what was then a cutting-edge riveted iron frame construction, supporting a lightweight wooden-beam roof. The building also forms the second-largest example of Gothic revival architecture in Britain, after the Palace of Westminster. An illustration of the Main Building previously featured on the reverse side of £100 notes issued by Clydesdale Bank.

The university's Hunterian Museum resides in the Main Building, and the related Hunterian Gallery is housed in buildings adjacent to the University Library. The latter includes "The Mackintosh House", a rebuilt terraced house designed by, and furnished after, architect Charles Rennie Mackintosh.

Even these enlarged premises could not contain the expanding university, which quickly spread across much of Gilmorehill. The 1930s saw the construction of the award-winning round Reading Room (it is now a category-A listed building) and an aggressive program of house purchases, in which the university (fearing the surrounding district of Hillhead was running out of suitable building land) acquired several terraces of Victorian houses and joined them together internally. The departments of Psychology, Computing Science, and most of the Arts Faculty continue to be housed in these terraces.

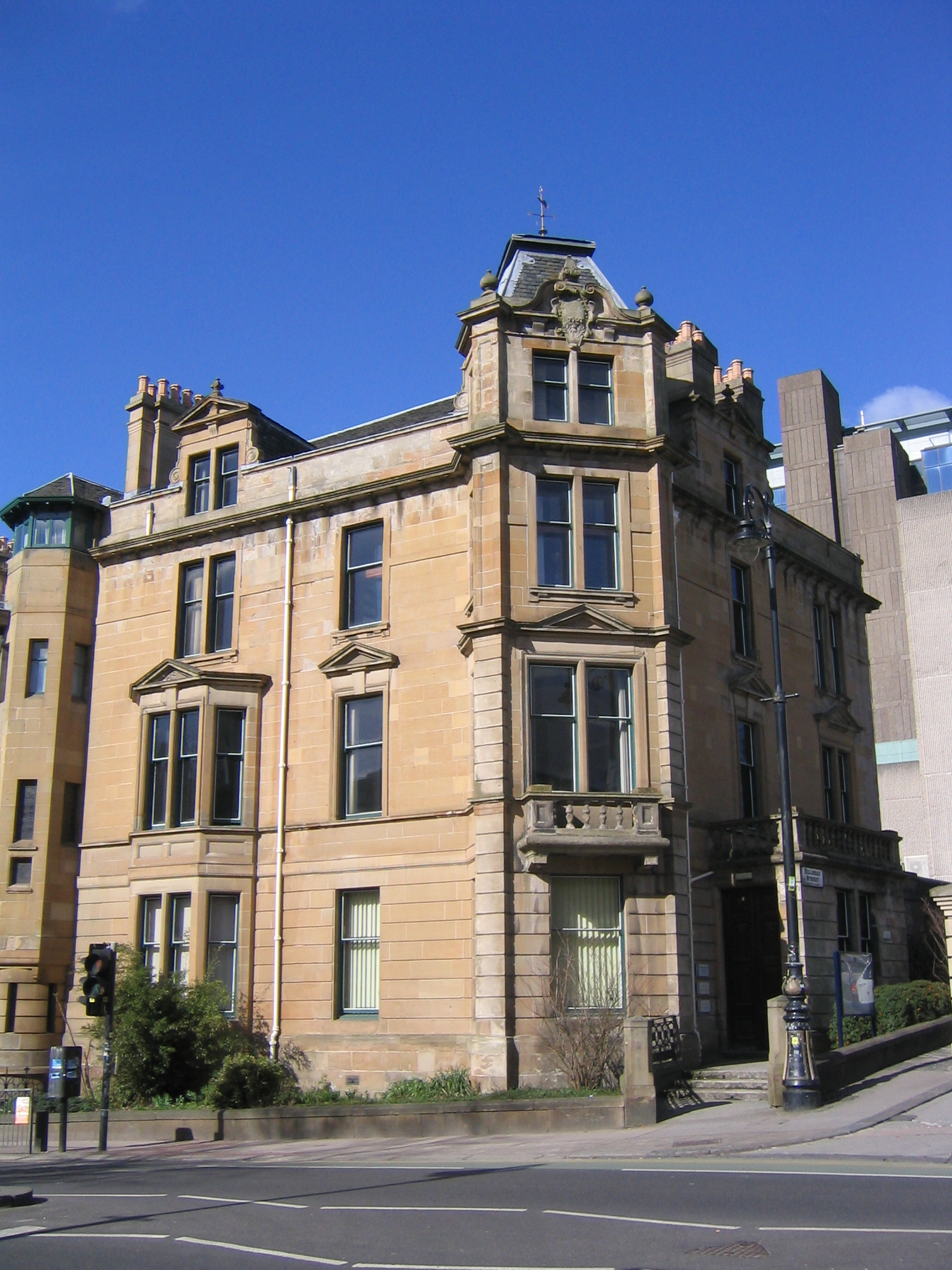
The School of History building occupies what were formerly townhouses on University Avenue.

More buildings were built to the west of the Main Building, developing the land between University Avenue and the River Kelvin with natural science buildings and the faculty of medicine. The medical school spread into neighboring Partick and joined with the Western Infirmary. At the eastern flank of the Main Building, the James Watt Engineering Building was completed in 1959. The growth and prosperity of the city, which had originally forced the university's relocation to Hillhead, again proved problematic when more real estate was required. The school of veterinary medicine, which was founded in 1862, moved to a new campus in the leafy surrounds of Garscube Estate, around two miles (3 km) west of the main campus, in 1954. The university later moved its sports ground and associated facilities to Garscube and also built student halls of residence in both Garscube and Maryhill.

The expected growth of tertiary education in the 1960s following publication of the Robbins Report led the university to build numerous modern buildings across Hillhead in a development zone, originally comprising mainly residential tenements, that had been designated on the north side of University Avenue in 1945. Several of these new buildings were in the brutalist style; the Mathematics Building at the west end of University Avenue (opened 1968, demolished 2017), the Rankine Building at the east end of University Avenue (opened 1970), the multipurpose Adam Smith Building (opened 1967) on the crest of the hill above University Gardens, and the new Queen Margaret Union building (opened 1968) on the University Gardens site previously occupied by the University Observatory. These were joined by others in various modernist styles; both the Library and Boyd Orr Building (opened 1968 and 1972 respectively) were configured as tower blocks, as was the Genetics Building at the very south end of the campus on Dumbarton Road (opened 1967, named for Guido Pontecorvo in 1994, demolished 2021), while the amber-brick Geology Building (opened 1980, named for John Walter Gregory in 1998, renamed for Silas Molema in 2021) was built to a low-rise design on the former site of eight terraced houses in Lilybank Gardens.

To further cater to the expanding student population, a new refectory—known as the Hub—was opened adjacent to the library in 1966, and the Glasgow University Union building at the eastern end of University Avenue was extended in 1965.

In October 2001 the century-old Bower Building (previously home to the university's botany department) was gutted by fire. The interior and roof of the building were largely destroyed, though the main façade remained intact. After a £10.8 million refit, the building re-opened in November 2004.

The Wolfson Medical School Building, with its award-winning glass-fronted atrium, opened in 2002, and in 2003, the St Andrews Building was opened, housing what is now the School of Education. It is sited a short walk from Gilmorehill, in the Woodlands area of the city on the site of the former Queens College, which had in turn been bought by Glasgow Caledonian University, from whom the university acquired the site. It replaced the St Andrews Campus in Bearsden. The university also procured the former Hillhead Congregational Church, converting it into a lecture theatre in 2005. The Sir Alwyn Williams building, designed by Reiach and Hall, was completed at Lilybank Terrace in 2007, housing the School of Computing Science.

In September 2016, in partnership with Glasgow City Council, Glasgow Life, and the National Library of Scotland, the transformed Kelvin Hall was brought into new public use including in Phase I the Hunterian Collections and Study Centre.

The Mathematics Building, on University Way adjacent to the Boyd Orr Building, was demolished in 2017 to make way for a new 'Learning Hub' intended to provide individual and group study spaces for more than 2,500 students, as well as a 500-seat lecture theatre. Built at a cost of £90.6 million, it opened in April 2021 and is named for James McCune Smith, the first African American to earn a degree in medicine and a University of Glasgow alumnus. A further investment of over £900 million is being made across the Gilmorehill campus, focused mainly on redeveloping the 5.7-hectare (14-acre) site between University Avenue and Dumbarton Road that was occupied by the Western Infirmary between 1874 and 2015.

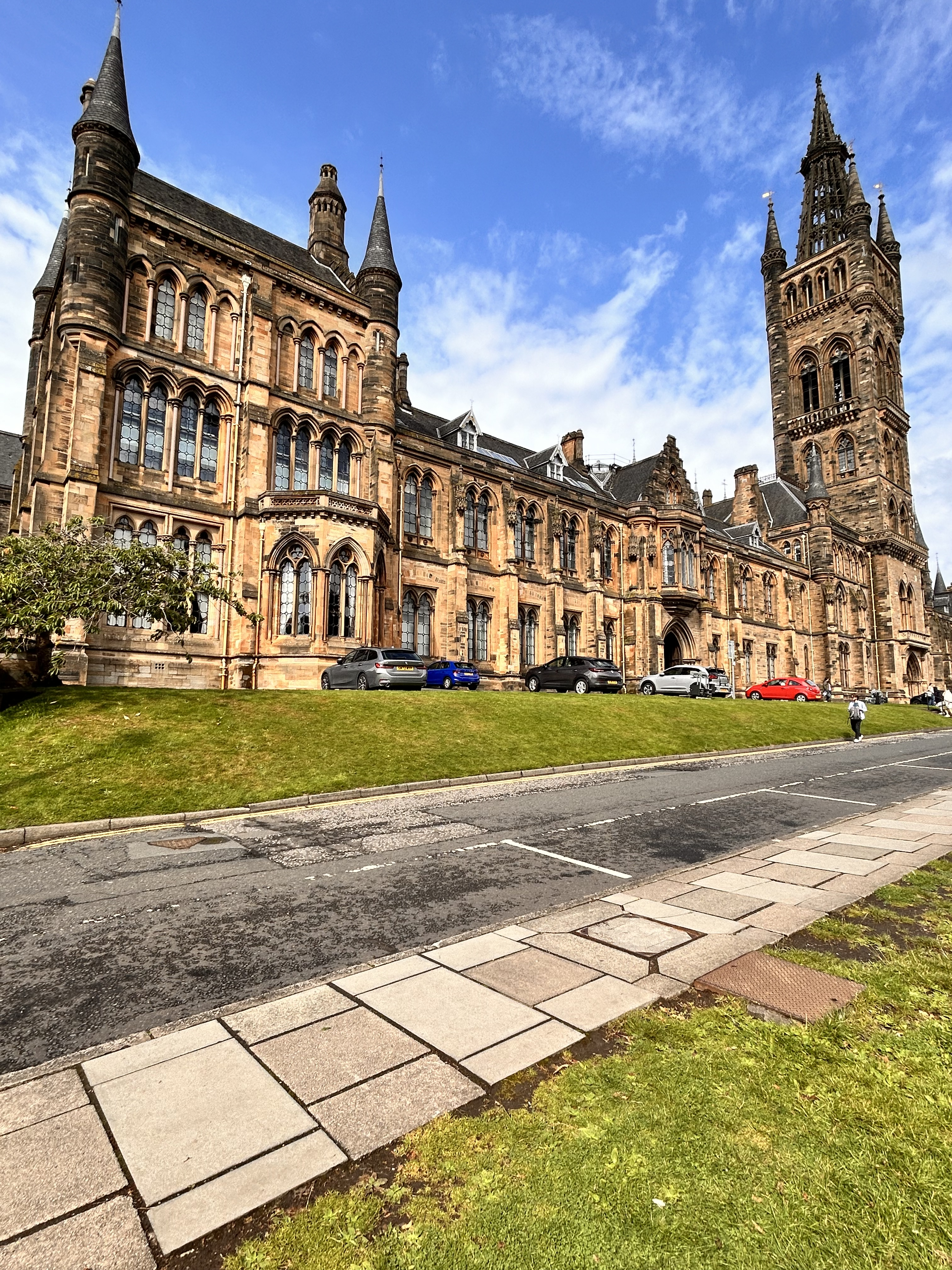
The University of Glasgow 14 July 2025

==== Chapel ====
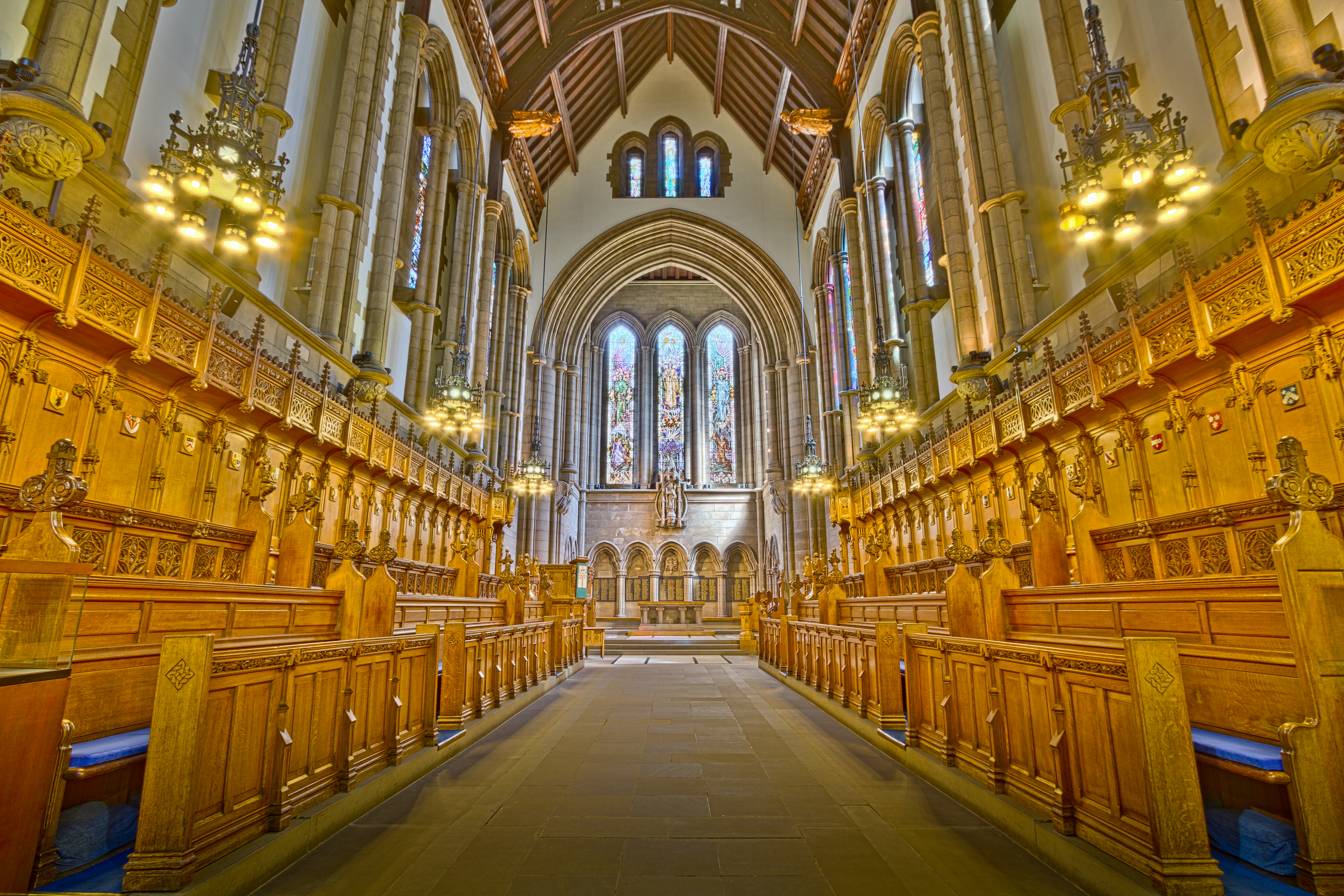
Interior of the Chapel

The University Chapel was constructed as a memorial to the 755 sons of the university who had died in the First World War. Designed by Sir John Burnet, it was completed in 1929 and dedicated on 4 October. Tablets on the wall behind the Communion Table list the names of those who died, while other tablets besides the stalls record the 405 members of the university community who gave their lives in the Second World War. Most of the windows are the work of Douglas Strachan, although some have been added over the years, including those on the South Wall, created by Alan Younger.

Daily services are held in the chapel during term-time, as well as seasonal events. Before Christmas, there is a Service of Nine Lessons and Carols on the last Sunday of term, and a Watchnight service on Christmas Eve. Graduates, students, members of staff, and the children of members of staff are entitled to be married in the chapel, which is also used for baptisms and funerals. Civil marriages and civil partnerships may be blessed in the chapel, although under UK law may not be performed there.

The current chaplain of the university is the Reverend Stuart MacQuarrie, and the university appoints honorary chaplains of other denominations.

==== Library and archives ====
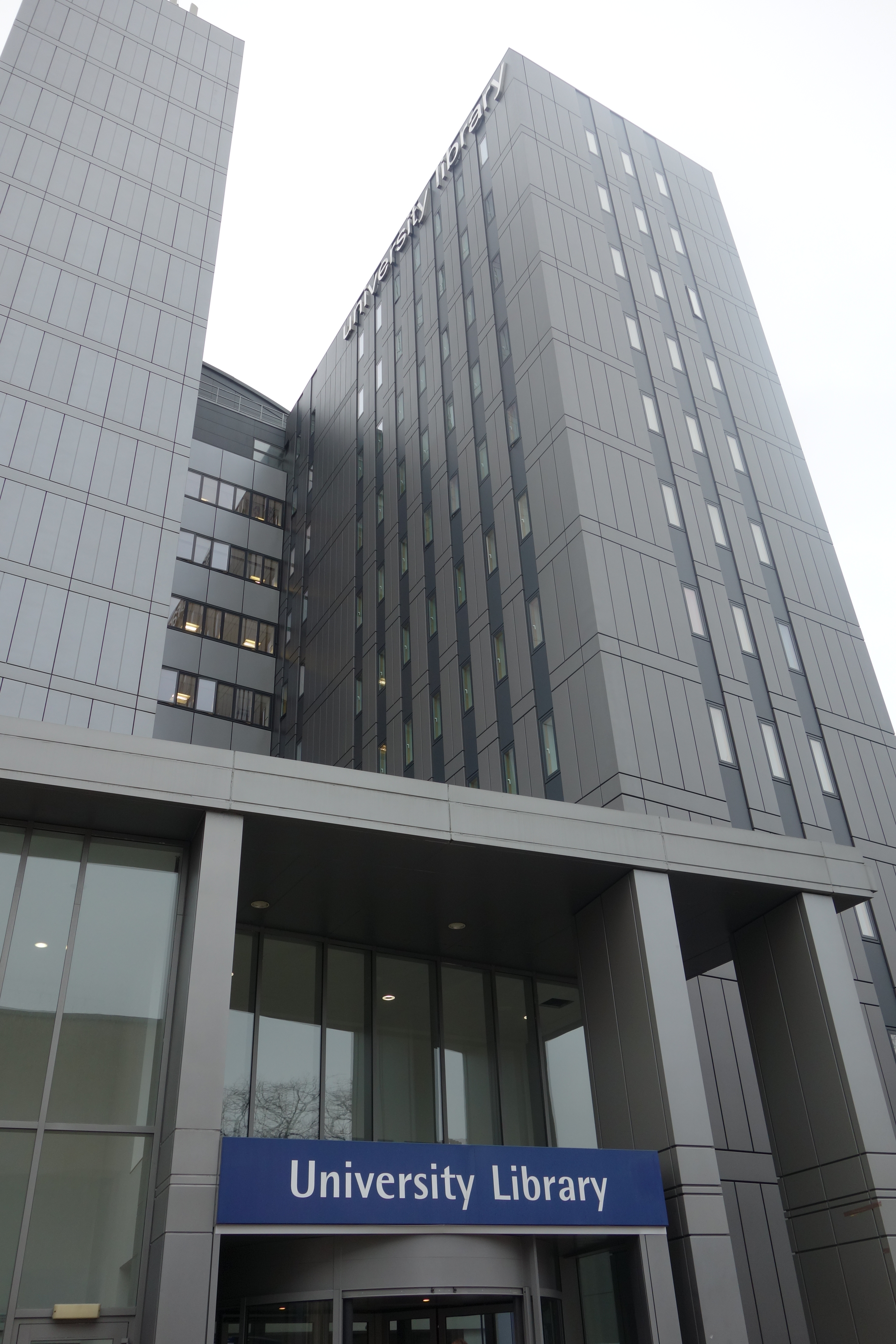
The university's library as of 2017

Glasgow University Library is situated on Hillhead Street opposite the Main Building. The current 12-storey building was opened in 1968 and hosts approximately 2.5 million books and journals, and provides electronic resources, including over 50,000 electronic journals. It houses sections for periodicals, microfilms, special collections and rare materials.

In addition to the main library, subject libraries exist for Medicine, Chemistry, Dental Medicine, Veterinary Medicine, Education, Law, History of Art, and the faculty of Social Sciences, which are held in branch libraries around the campus. In 2007, a section to house the library's collection of historic photographs was opened, funded by the Wolfson Foundation.

The Archives of the University of Glasgow maintains the historical records of the university, created and accumulated since its foundation in 1451.

=== Crichton campus, Dumfries ===
The university opened the Crichton campus in Dumfries, Dumfries and Galloway during the 1980s. It was designed to meet the needs for tertiary education in an area far from major cities and is operated jointly by the University of Glasgow, the University of the West of Scotland and the Open University. It offers a modular undergraduate curriculum, leading to one of a small number of liberal arts degrees, as well as providing the region's only access to postgraduate study.

=== Non-teaching facilities ===
As well as the teaching campuses, the university has halls of residence in and around the north-west of the city, accommodating a total of approximately 3,500 students. These include the Murano Street Student Village in Maryhill; Wolfson halls on the Garscube Estate; Queen Margaret halls in Kelvinside; and Cairncross House and Kelvinhaugh Gate, in Yorkhill. In recent years, Dalrymple House and Horslethill halls in Dowanhill, Reith halls in North Kelvinside and the Maclay halls in Park Circus (near Kelvingrove Park), have closed and been sold, as the development value of such property increased.

The Stevenson Building on Gilmorehill opened in 1961 and provides students with the use of a fitness suite, squash courts, sauna, and six-lane, 25-metre swimming pool. The university also has a large sports complex on the Garscube Estate, besides their Wolfson Halls and Vet School. This is a new facility, replacing the previous Westerlands sports ground in the Anniesland area of the city. The university also has use of half of the East Boathouse situated at Glasgow Green on the River Clyde where Glasgow University Boat Club train.

== Governance and administration ==
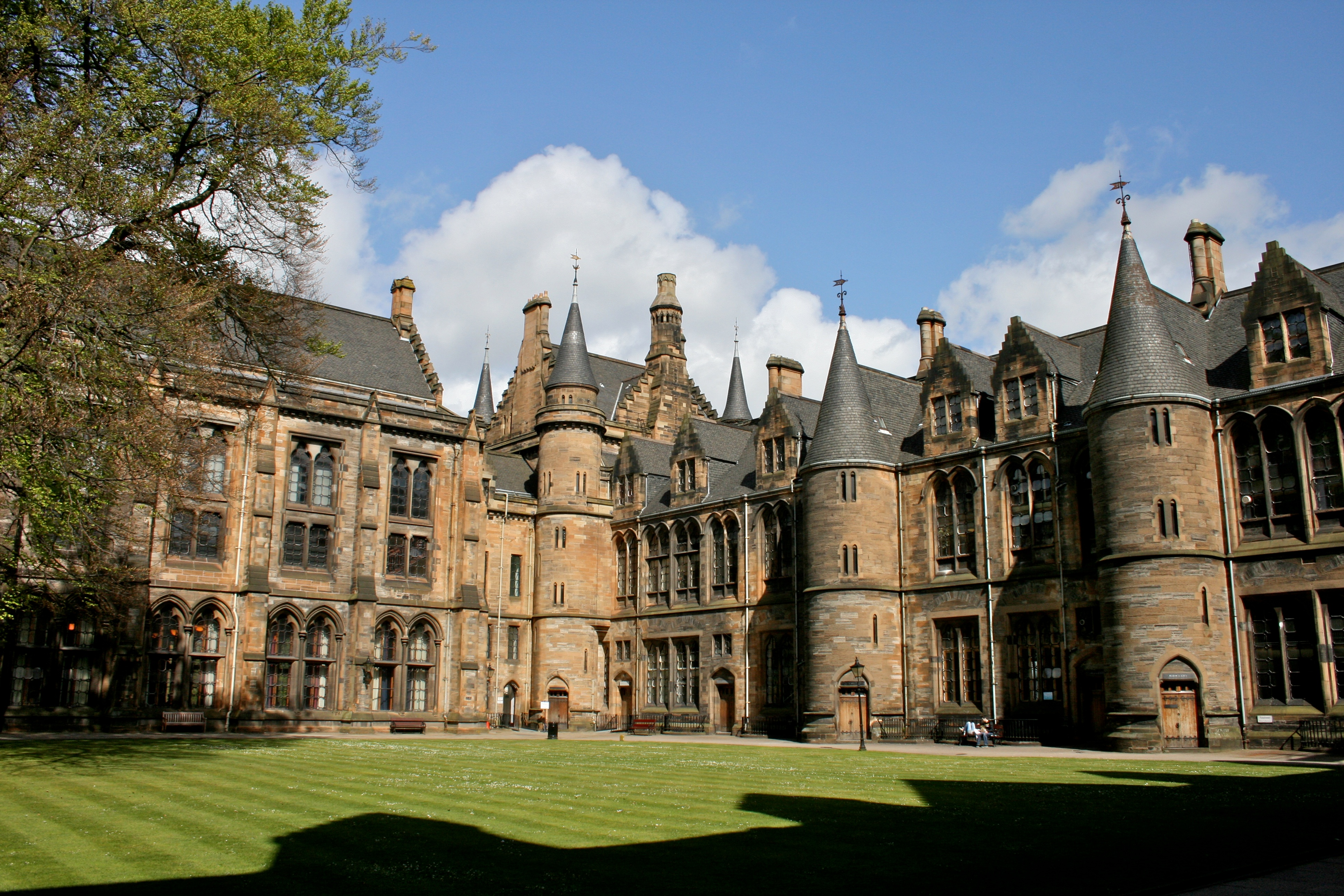
A block of buildings in Gilmorehill campus

In common with the other ancient universities of Scotland the university's constitution is laid out in the Universities (Scotland) Acts. These Acts create a tripartite structure of bodies: the University Court (governing body), the Academic Senate (academic affairs), and the General Council (advisory). There is also a clear separation between governance and executive administration.

The university's constitution, academic regulations, and appointments are described in the university calendar, while other aspects of its story and constitution are detailed in a separate "history" document.

=== University officials ===
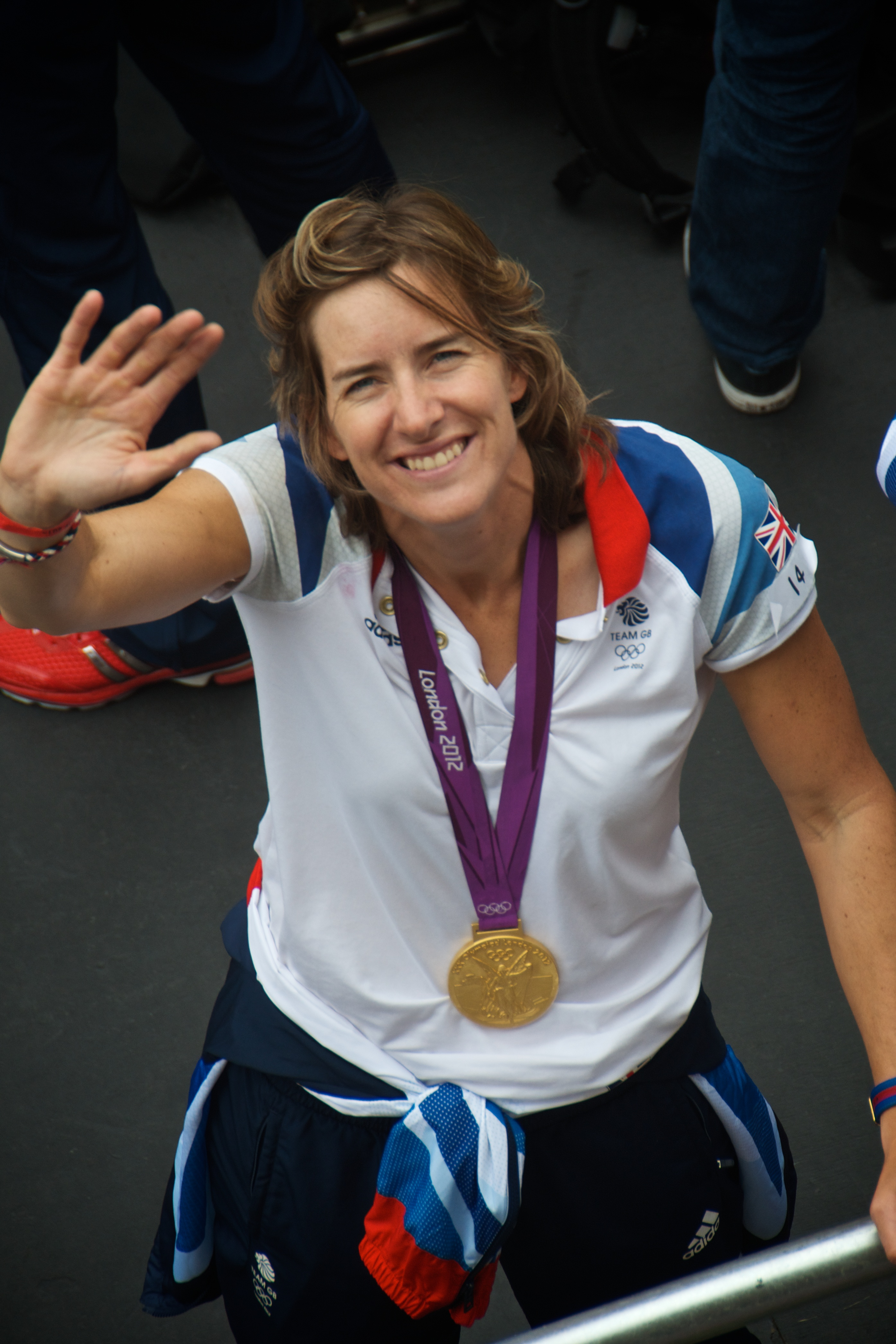
Dame Katherine Grainger, current chancellor

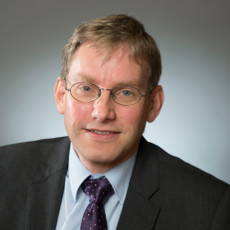
Andy Schofield, current Principal and Vice-Chancellor

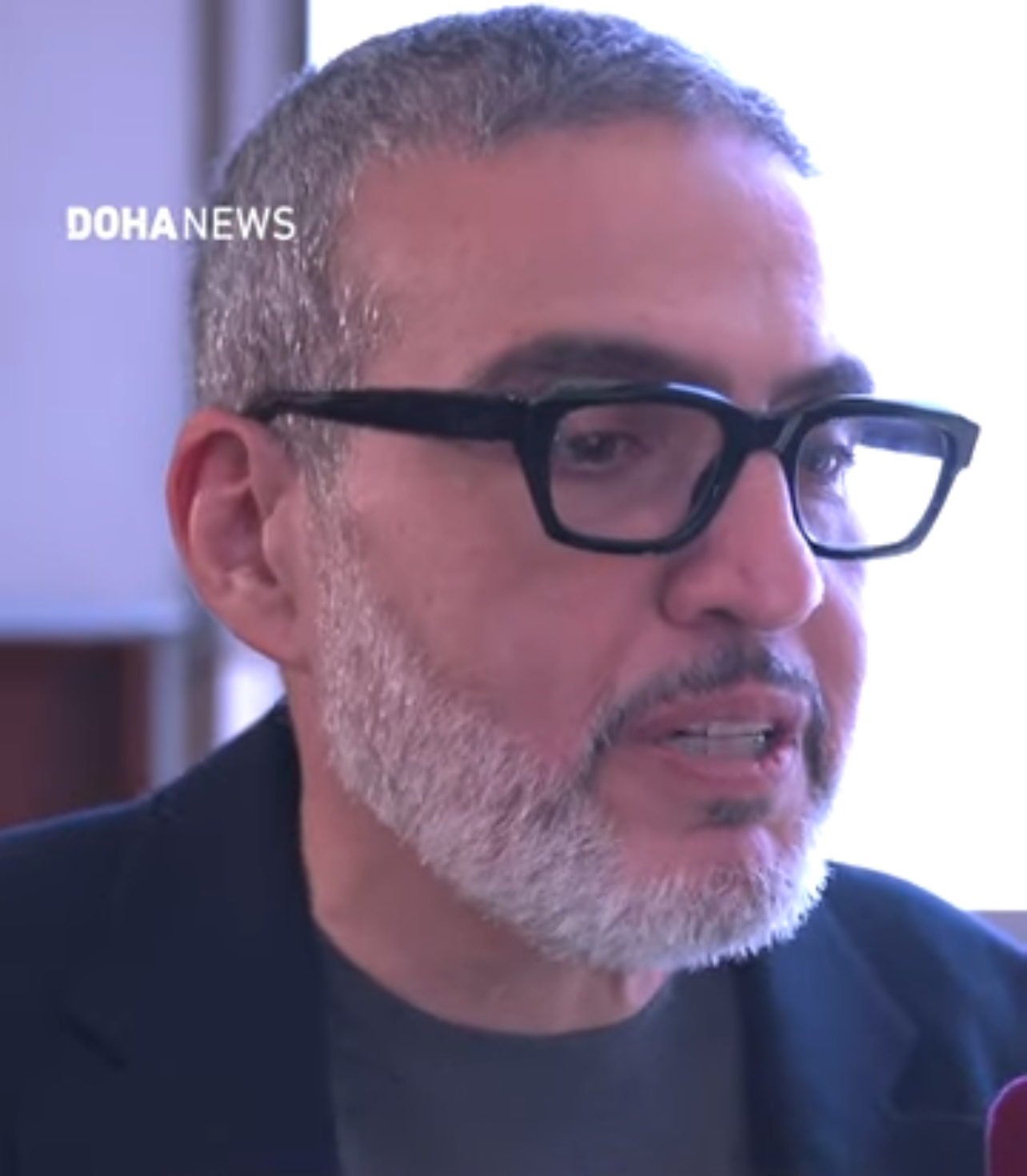
Ghassan Abu-Sittah, current rector

The university's three most significant officials are its chancellor, principal, and rector, whose rights and responsibilities are largely derived from the Universities (Scotland) Act 1858.

The chancellor is the titular head of the university and president of the general council. They award all degrees, although this duty is generally carried out by the vice-chancellor, appointed by them. The current chancellor is Dame Katherine Grainger, a former rower who is Britain's most decorated female Olympian, the current chair of UK Sport, and former chancellor of Oxford Brookes University. She is an alumna of the university, with a Master of Philosophy (MPhil) in medical law and medical ethics. She is the first woman to hold the office in the university.

Day-to-day management of the university is undertaken by the University Principal (who is also Vice-Chancellor). The current principal is Andy Schofield who replaced Sir Anton Muscatelli in October 2025. There are also several Vice-Principals, each with a specific remit. They, along with the Clerk of Senate, play a major role in the day-to-day management of the university.

All students at the university are eligible to vote in the election of the rector (officially styled "Lord Rector"), who holds office for a three-year term and chairs the University Court. In the past, this position has been a largely honorary and ceremonial one, and has been held by political figures including William Gladstone, Benjamin Disraeli, Bonar Law, Robert Peel, Raymond Poincaré, Arthur Balfour, Charles Kennedy and 1970s union activist Jimmy Reid, and latterly by celebrities such as TV presenters Arthur Montford and Johnny Ball, musician Pat Kane, and actors Richard Wilson, Ross Kemp and Greg Hemphill. In 2004, for the first time in its history, the university was left without a rector as no nominations were received. When the elections were run in December, Mordechai Vanunu was chosen for the post, even though he was unable to attend due to restrictions placed upon him by the Israeli government. In 2014, Edward Snowden, an American computer specialist, a former Central Intelligence Agency (CIA) employee, and former National Security Agency (NSA) contractor—who came to international attention when he disclosed a large number of classified NSA documents to several media outlets—was elected. In 2017, Aamer Anwar a Scottish lawyer and former student of the university was elected rector until 2020 when rector elections had to be postponed due to the COVID-19 pandemic. On 21 April 2021, Rita Rae, Lady Rae a Scottish lawyer, judge and former senator of the College of Justice was appointed rector after a decisive victory. The current office holder is Dr. Ghassan Abu-Sittah, who was installed in the position on 11 April 2024, after winning 80% of the vote and while under investigation by the university.

=== University Court ===
The governing body of the university is the University Court, which is responsible for contractual matters, employing staff, and all other matters relating to finance and administration. The court takes decisions about the deployment of resources as well as formulating strategic plans for the university. The court is chaired by the rector, who is elected by all the matriculated students at the university. The university secretary is the head of university services and assists the principal in day-to-day management. The current university secretary is David Duncan.

=== Academic Senate ===
The Academic Senate (or University Senate) is the body which is responsible for the management of academic affairs, and which recommends the conferment of degrees by the chancellor. Membership of the Senate comprises all Professors of the university, as well as elected academic members, representatives of the Student's Representative Council, the Secretary of Court and directors of university services (e.g. Library). The president of the Senate is the principal.

The clerk of Senate, who has a status equivalent to that of a vice-principal and is a member of the Senior Management Group, has responsibility for regulation of the university's academic policy, such as dealing with plagiarism and the conduct of examinations. Notable clerks of Senate have included the chemist, Joseph Black; John Anderson, father of the University of Strathclyde; and the economist, John Millar.

=== Committees ===
There are also a number of committees of both the court and Senate that make important decisions and investigate matters referred to them. As well as these bodies there is a general council made up of the university graduates that is involved in the running of the university. The graduates also elect the chancellor of the university.

=== Research system and repository ===
The University maintains an in-house constructed research information system containing data on all institutional research, including financial and personnel information. This research system is closely linked to the "Enlighten" institutional repository, which is effectively a collection of research output in the form of publications and theses.

=== Finances ===
In the financial year ending 31 July 2024, the University of Glasgow had a total income of £950 million (2022/23 – £944.2 million) and total expenditure of £658.6 million (2022/23 – £827.4 million). Key sources of income included £387.8 million from tuition fees and education contracts (2022/23 – £403.8 million), £182.7 million from funding body grants (2022/23 – £185.9 million), £221.1 million from research grants and contracts (2022/23 – £220.7 million), £40.2 million from investment income (2022/23 – £23 million) and £7.3 million from donations and endowments (2022/23 – £8 million).

At year end, Glasgow had endowments of £262.4 million (2023 – £234.3 million) and total net assets of £1.409 billion (2023 – £1.079 billion). It holds the fifth-largest endowment of any university in the UK.

== Organisation ==
There are currently four Colleges, each containing a number of Schools. They are:

College of Arts & Humanities

- ArtsLab Glasgow
- Graduate School of the College of Arts & Humanities
- School of Critical Studies
- School of Culture and Creative Arts
- School of Humanities
- School of Modern Languages and Cultures

College of Medical, Veterinary and Life Sciences

- School of Biodiversity, One Health & Veterinary Medicine
- School of Cancer Sciences
- School of Cardiovascular & Metabolic Health
- School of Health & Wellbeing
- School of Infection & Immunity
- School of Medicine, Dentistry & Nursing
- School of Molecular Biosciences
- School of Psychology & Neuroscience

College of Science and Engineering

- School of Chemistry
- School of Computing Science
- James Watt School of Engineering
- School of Geographical and Earth Sciences
- School of Mathematics & Statistics
- School of Physics and Astronomy

Research at the James Watt School of Engineering includes electromagnetic sensing and 6G wireless systems, with work by Qammer H. Abbasi]. College of Social Sciences

- Adam Smith Business School
- School of Education
- School of Social & Environmental Sustainability (at Crichton Campus, Dumfries)
- School of Law
- School of Social & Political Sciences

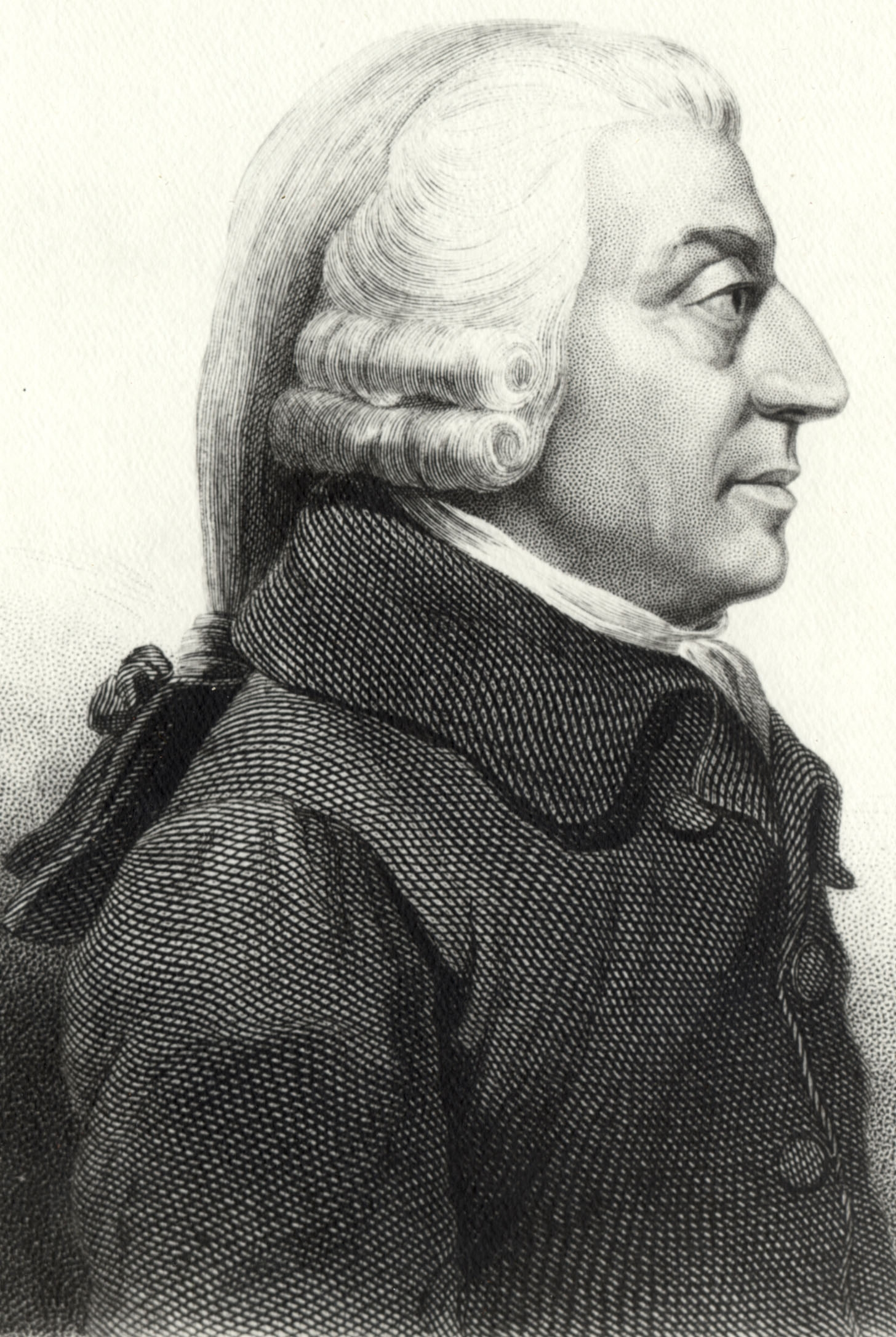
Adam Smith lends his name to the business school

At the university's foundation in 1451, there were four original faculties: Arts, Divinity, Law, and Medicine. The Faculty of Divinity became a constituent school of the Faculty of Arts in 2002, while the Faculty of Law was changed in 1984 into the Faculty of Law and Financial Studies, and in 2005 became the Faculty of Law, Business and Social Sciences. Although one of the original faculties established, teaching in the Faculty of Medicine did not begin formally until 1714, with the revival of the Chair in the Practice of Medicine. The Faculty of Science was formed in 1893 from Chairs removed from the Faculties of Arts and Medicine, and subsequently divided in 2000 to form the three Faculties of Biomedical and Life Sciences, Computing Science, Mathematics and Statistics (now Information and Mathematical Sciences) and Physical Sciences. The Faculty of Social Sciences was formed from Chairs in the Faculty of Arts in 1977, and merged to form the Faculty of Law, Business and Social Sciences in 2005, the two having operated as a single 'resource unit' since 2002. The Faculty of Engineering was formally established in 1923, although engineering had been taught at the university since 1840 when Queen Victoria founded the UK's first chair of engineering. Through a concordat ratified in 1913, Royal Technical College (later Royal College of Science and Technology and now University of Strathclyde) students received Glasgow degrees in applied sciences, particularly engineering. It was in 1769 when James Watt's engineering at Glasgow led to a stable steam engine and, subsequently, the Industrial Revolution. The Faculty of Veterinary Medicine was established in 1862 as the independent Glasgow Veterinary College, being subsumed into the university in 1949 and gaining independent Faculty status in 1969. The Faculty of Education was formed in 1999 when the university merged with St Andrew's College of Education, which had been formed in 1981 through the merger of two Catholic colleges: Notre Dame College of Education, Glasgow, founded in 1895 and Craiglockhart College of Education, Edinburgh, founded in 1920.

On 1 August 2010, the former faculties of the university were removed and replaced by a system of four larger Colleges, intended to encourage interdisciplinary research and make the university more competitive. This structure was similar to that at other universities, including the University of Edinburgh.

== Academic profile ==
=== Rankings and reputation ===
Rankings
National rankings
- Complete (2027): 29
- Guardian (2027): 21
- Times / Sunday Times (2027): 15

Global rankings
- ARWU (2026): 151–200
- QS (2027): 80
- THE (2026): 84

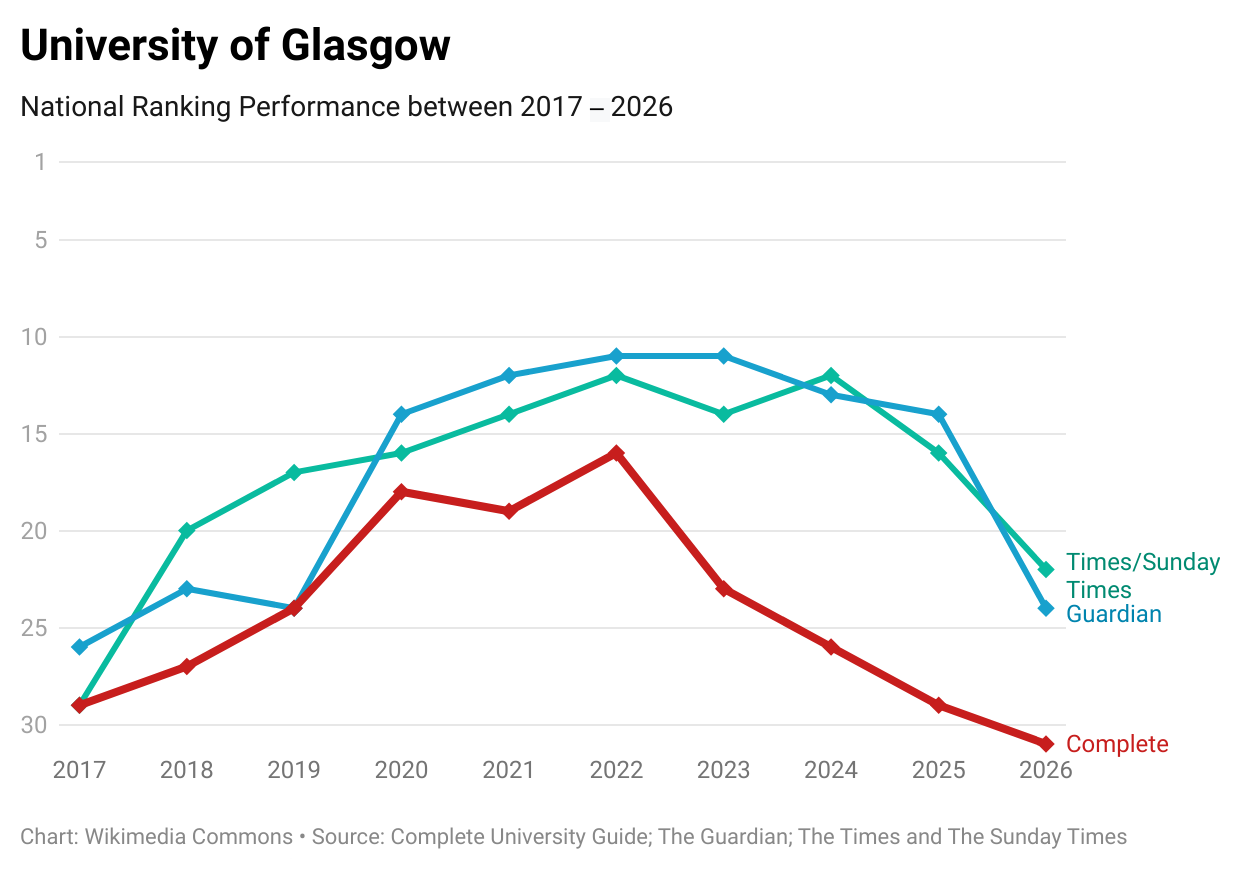
University of Glasgow's national league table performance over the past ten years

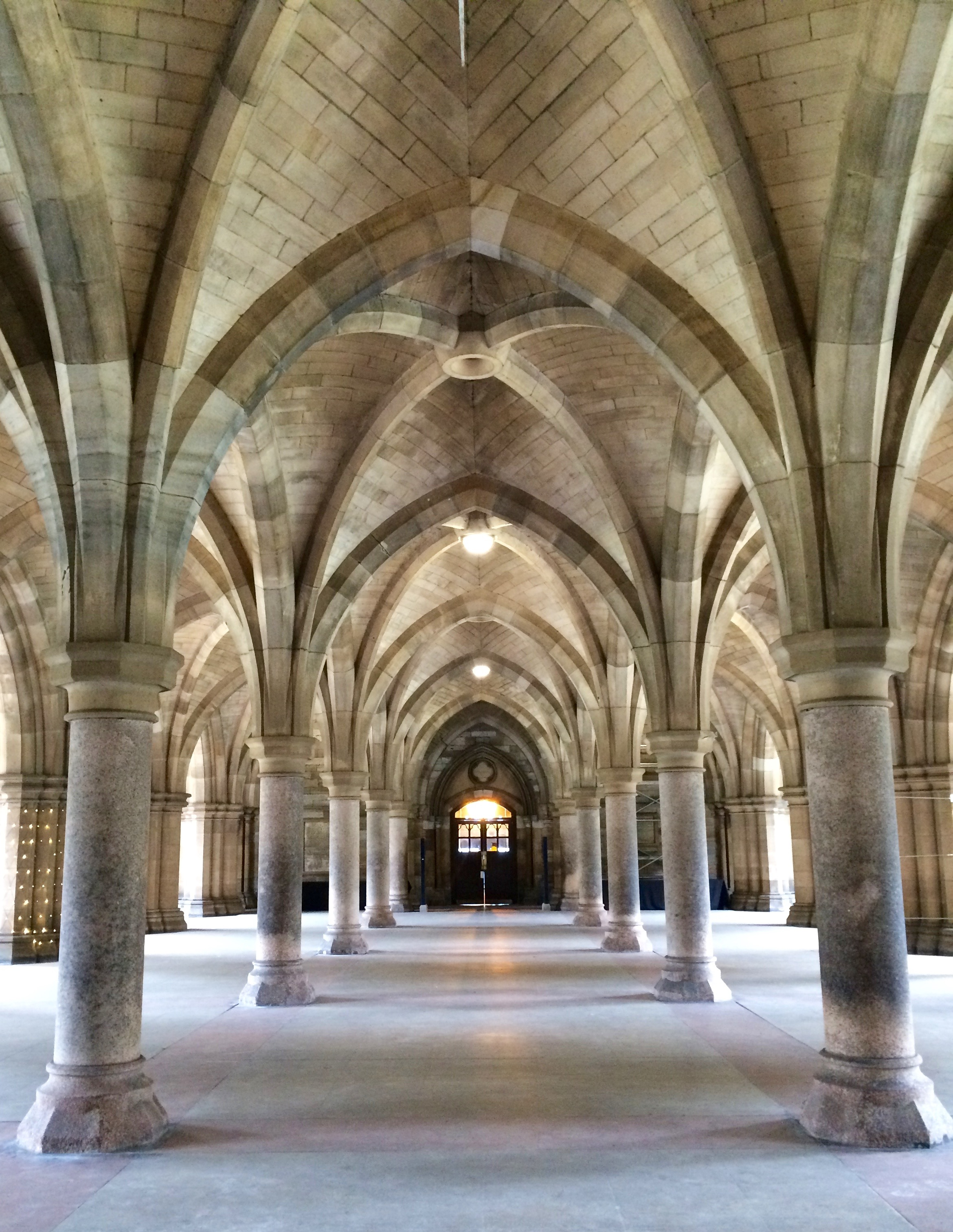
Cloisters between quadrangles

The university is a member of the Russell Group of research-led British universities and was a founding member of the organisation Universitas 21, an international grouping of universities dedicated to setting worldwide standards for higher education. The university currently has fifteen Regius Professorships, more than in any other UK university.

In the QS World University Rankings, Glasgow climbed to 51st in 2013. In national rankings, Glasgow places within the top 30 in the UK and 3rd in Scotland for the employability of its graduates as ranked by recruiters from the UK's major companies.

In the 2008 Research Assessment Exercise (RAE), almost 70% of research carried out at the university was in the top two categories (88% in the top three categories). Eighteen subject areas were rated top ten in the UK, whilst fourteen subject areas were rated the best in Scotland. The 2008 Times RAE table ranks according to an 'average' score across all departments, of which Glasgow posted an average of 2.6/4. The overall average placed Glasgow as the 33rd-highest of all UK universities, perhaps reflecting the broadness of the university's activities. In terms of research 'power', however, Glasgow placed 14th in the UK and 2nd in Scotland.

=== Admissions ===
UCAS Admission Statistics
	2025	2024	2023	2022	2021
Applications (Note: Main scheme applications, International and UK)	37,925	36,830	37,300	41,915	42,180
Accepted	6,360	6,665	6,055	6,220	6,605
Applications/Accepted Ratio	6.0	5.5	6.2	6.7	6.4
Overall Offer Rate (%)	68.9	69.8	65.8	64.0	59.4
↳ UK only (%) (Note: UK domiciled applicants)	64.7	66.6	63.6	61.2	56.3
Average Entry Tariff	—N/a	—N/a	203	215	209
↳ Top three exams (Note: The maximum tariff score for three exams is 168: the equivalent of A*A*A* at A-Level, 777 at HL for the IB Diploma Programme, or AAA at Advanced Higher)	—N/a	—N/a	145.3	153.3	146.6

HESA Student Body Composition (2024/25)
Domicile and Ethnicity	Total
British White (Note: Not be confused solely with White British)	52%
British Ethnic Minorities (Note: Includes those who indicate that they identify as Asian, Black, Mixed Heritage, Arab or any other ethnicity except White.)	12%
International EU	3%
International Non-EU	33%
Undergraduate Widening Participation Indicators
Female	59%
Independent School	14%
Low Participation Areas (Note: Calculated from the Polar4 measure, using Quintile1, in England and Wales. Calculated from the Scottish Index of Multiple Deprivation (SIMD) measure, using SIMD20, in Scotland.)	4%

In the 2024/25 academic year, the student body consisted of 38,710 students, composed of 24,300 undergraduates and 14,410 postgraduate students. The university is consistently designated as a 'high-tariff' institution by the Department for Education, with the average undergraduate entrant to the university in recent years amassing between 145–153 UCAS Tariff points in their top three pre-university qualifications – the equivalent of AAA to A*AA at A-Level. Based on 2022/23 HESA entry standards data published in domestic league tables, which include a broad range of qualifications beyond the top three exam grades, the average student at the University of Glasgow achieved 215 points – the highest in the United Kingdom.

For undergraduate entry, in 2018 course requirements ranged from A*A*A* (for second year entry) to BBB (for minimum requirements for Primary Teaching) in A-levels. Glasgow has a large (for the UK) proportion of "home" students, with almost 40 per cent of the student body coming from the West of Scotland. In the 2016–17 academic year, the university had a domicile breakdown of 71:11:18 of UK:EU:non-EU students, respectively, with a female-to-male ratio of 59:41.

As the number of places available for Scottish applicants are capped by the Scottish Government as they do not pay tuition fees, students applying from the rest of the UK and outside of the UK have a higher likelihood of an offer. For most courses, with the exceptions of Medicine, Dentistry, Veterinary Medicine and Law, the university guarantees unconditional offers to applicants who have achieved AAAA or AAABB in one sitting at Scottish Highers. The other components of the applicant's UCAS form (such as predicted grades and the personal statement) are only taken into account if the applicant has not achieved these grades.

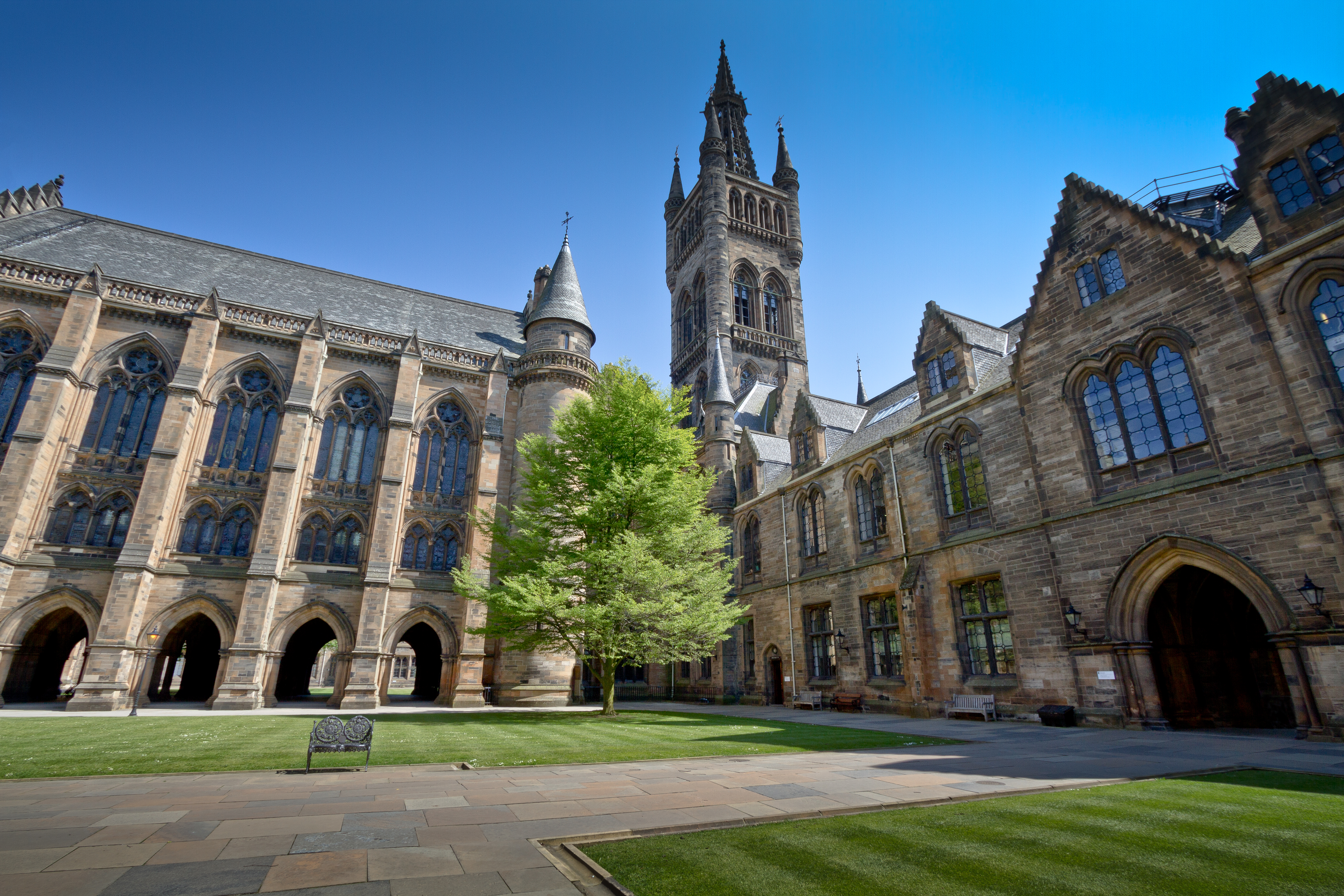
The quadrangle at the University of Glasgow

== Student life ==
Unlike other universities in Scotland, Glasgow does not have a single students' association; instead, there exist a number of bodies concerned with the representation, welfare, and entertainment of its students. Due to the university's retention of its separate male and female students' unions, which since 1980 have admitted both sexes as full members, there are two independent students' unions, as well as a sports association and the students' representative council. None of these are affiliated to the National Union of Students: membership has been rejected on a number of occasions, most recently in November 2006, on both economic and political grounds. A student-run "No to NUS" campaign won a campuswide referendum with more than 90% of the vote.

In common with the other ancient universities of Scotland, students at Glasgow also elect a Rector.

The university has an eclectic body of clubs and societies, including sports teams, political and religious groups, and gaming societies.

=== Students' Representative Council ===
Glasgow University Students' Representative Council is the legal representative body for students, as recognized by the Universities (Scotland) Act 1889. The SRC is responsible for representing students' interests to the management of the university, to local and national government, and for health and welfare issues. Under the Universities (Scotland) Acts, all students of the university automatically become members of the SRC; however, they are entitled to opt-out of this. Members of the SRC sit on various committees throughout the university, from the departmental level to the Senate and Court.

The SRC organizes Media Week, RAG (Raising And Giving) Week, and Welfare Week, as well as funding some 130 clubs and societies.

=== Unions ===
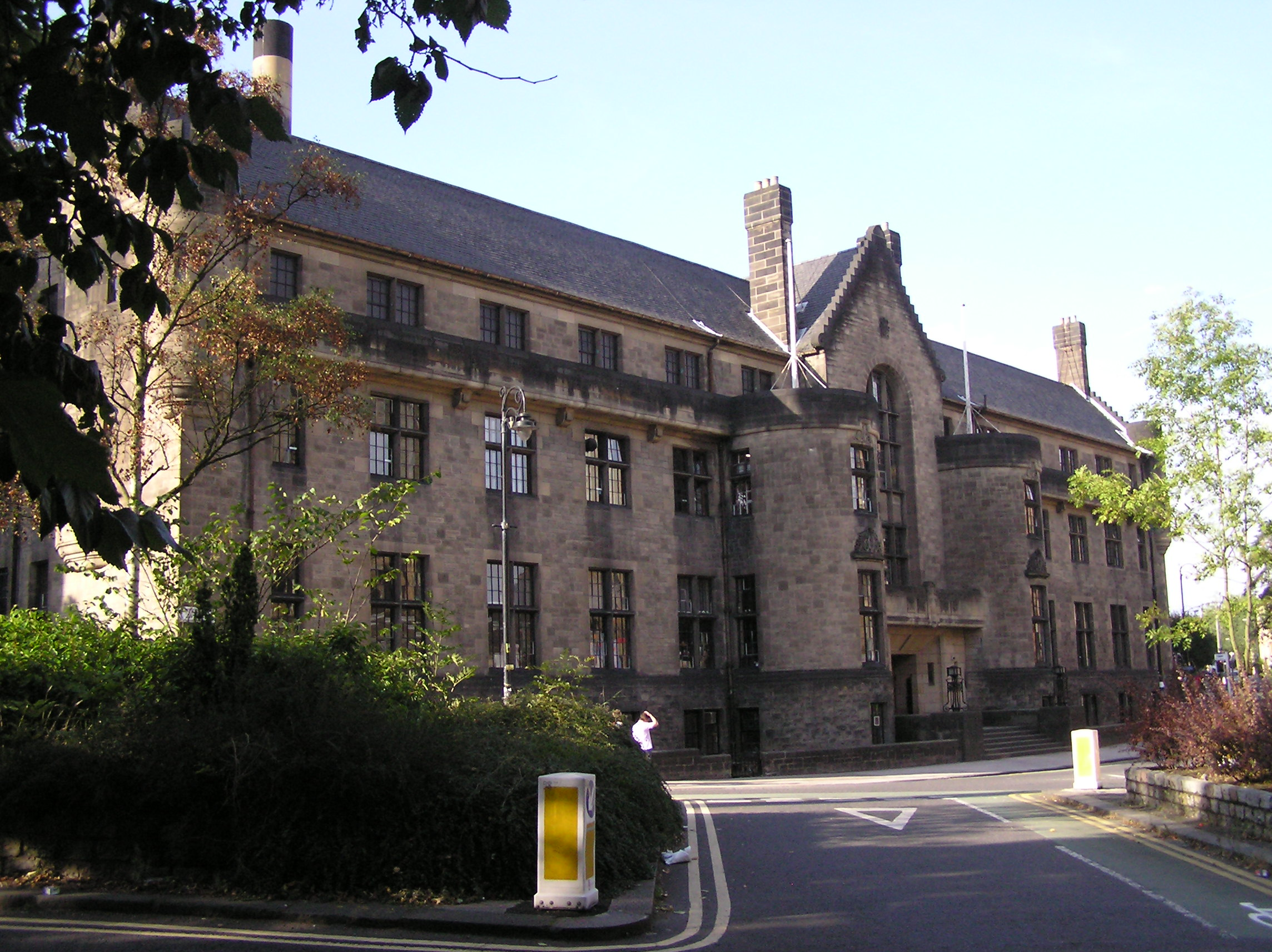
The Glasgow University Union's building at No. 32 University Avenue

In addition to the Students' Representative Council, students are commonly members of one of the university's two students' unions, the Glasgow University Union (GUU) and the Queen Margaret Union (QMU). Unlike many other student unions in the UK, membership to either GUU or QMU is not automatic and students must apply, for free, to become a member of either. Students are also permitted to be a member of both. These are largely social and cultural institutions, providing their members with facilities for debating, dining, recreation, socializing, and drinking, and both have a number of meeting rooms available for rental to members. Postgraduate students, mature students and staff were previously able to join the Hetherington Research Club; however, large debts led to the club being closed in February 2010. However, in February 2011, students gained access to the old HRC building, situated at 13 University Gardens (Hetherington House) and "reopened" it as the Free Hetherington, a social centre for learning and lectures, as well as protesting the shutting down of the club. Attempts to evict this occupation resulted in complaints of heavy-handed policing and much controversy on campus.

The separate unions exist due to the university's previous male-only status; the GUU was founded before the admission of women, while the QMU was originally the union of Queen Margaret College, a women-only college which merged with the university in 1892. Their continued separate existence is due largely to their individual atmospheres. The GUU's focus is mainly towards people involved in sports and debates (as among its founders were the Athletic Association and Dialectic Society), the QMU is one of Glasgow's music venues, and has played host to Nirvana, Red Hot Chili Peppers, Biffy Clyro and Franz Ferdinand.

In 1955, the GUU won the Observer Mace, now the John Smith Memorial Mace, named after the deceased GUU debater and former leader of the British Labour Party. The GUU has since won the mace debating championship fourteen more times, more than any other university. The GUU has also won the World Universities Debating Championships five times, more than any other university or club in the series' history.

=== Sports association ===
Sporting affairs are regulated by the Glasgow University Sports Association (GUSA) (previously the Glasgow University Athletics Club) which works closely with the Sport and Recreation Service. There are a large number of varied clubs, including Squash, Gaelic Football, Basketball, Cycling, Football, Hockey, Netball, Martial Arts and Rowing, who regularly compete in BUCS competitions. Students who join one of the sports clubs affiliated with the university must also join GUSA. However, there are also regular classes and drop-in sessions for various sports which are non-competitive and available to all university gym members.

=== Mature Students' Association ===
The community of mature students—that is those students aged 21 or over—are served by the Mature Students' Association located at 62 Oakfield Avenue. The MSA aims are to provide all mature students with facilities for recreation and study. Throughout the year, the MSA also organizes social events and peer support for the wide range of subjects studied by the university's mature students.

=== Media ===
There is an active student media scene at the university, part of, but editorially independent from, the SRC. There is a newspaper, the Glasgow University Guardian; Glasgow University Magazine; Glasgow University Student Television; and Subcity Radio. The Queen Margaret Union also publishes an independent magazine, qmunicate, and the Glasgow University Union produces the Magazine of the Glasgow University Union, referred to and marketed as "MoGUU", formerly known as 'G-you' and GUUi.

=== Mountaineering Club ===
Glasgow University Mountaineering Club is an outdoor association whose membership is composed of students and staff. Its origins are known from the late 1930s when students were already meeting on the Arrochar Alps; however, the club was officially constituted at the university in March 1941.

== Notable alumni and staff ==
Many distinguished figures have taught, worked and studied at the University of Glasgow, including seven Nobel laureates and three Prime Ministers, William Lamb, 2nd Viscount Melbourne, Sir Henry Campbell-Bannerman and Bonar Law. Famous names include the physicist Lord Kelvin, his pupil, and later partner of the Carnegie Steel Corporation, George Lauder, 'father of economics' Adam Smith, engineer James Watt, inventors Henry Faulds and John Logie Baird, chemists William Ramsay, Frederick Soddy and Joseph Black, biologist Sir John Boyd Orr, philosophers Francis Hutcheson, Thomas Reid and Dugald Stewart, mathematician Colin Maclaurin, ethnologist James George Frazer, missionary David Livingstone, writers James Boswell, John Buchan, A. J. Cronin, Amy Hoff, Tobias Smollett and Edwin Morgan, and surgeon Joseph Lister. Famous orientalist and president of the Asiatic Society of Bengal Henry Beveridge, University of Aberdeen founder Bishop William Elphinstone also graduated from Glasgow. In June 1933 Albert Einstein gave the first Gibson Lecture, on his general theory of relativity; he subsequently received an honorary degree from the university. Also John Macintyre, pioneer of radiology and Jocelyn Bell Burnell who discovered radio pulsars. In 1974, professors Graham Teasdale and Bryan Jennett developed the Glasgow Coma Scale.

In more recent times, the university was the focus of the "Glasgow Group" of poets and literary critics, including Philip Hobsbaum, Tom Leonard and Alasdair Gray. The university boasts one of Europe's largest collections of life scientists, as well as having been the training ground of numerous politicians including former prime ministers Bonar Law and Sir Henry Campbell-Bannerman, former First Minister Donald Dewar, former leader of the Liberal Democrats and former rector Charles Kennedy, Defence Secretaries Liam Fox and Des Browne, the founder of the UK Independence Party Alan Sked, former Labour Party leader John Smith, Business Secretary Vince Cable, former leader of the Liberal Democrats Sir Menzies Campbell, and former First Ministers Nicola Sturgeon and Humza Yousaf. Other notable alumni include banker Fred Goodwin, actor Gerard Butler, Rangers and Scottish footballer Neil Murray, actor, writer, television and radio broadcaster Colin Lamont (aka Scottie McClue), novelist Robin Jenkins, founder of the world's largest non-governmental development organisation BRAC Fazle Hasan Abed, television writers Armando Iannucci and Steven Moffat, comedian Greg Hemphill, television presenter Neil Oliver, journalists Andrew Neil and Raman Bhardwaj, and musicians Emeli Sandé and Simon Neil.

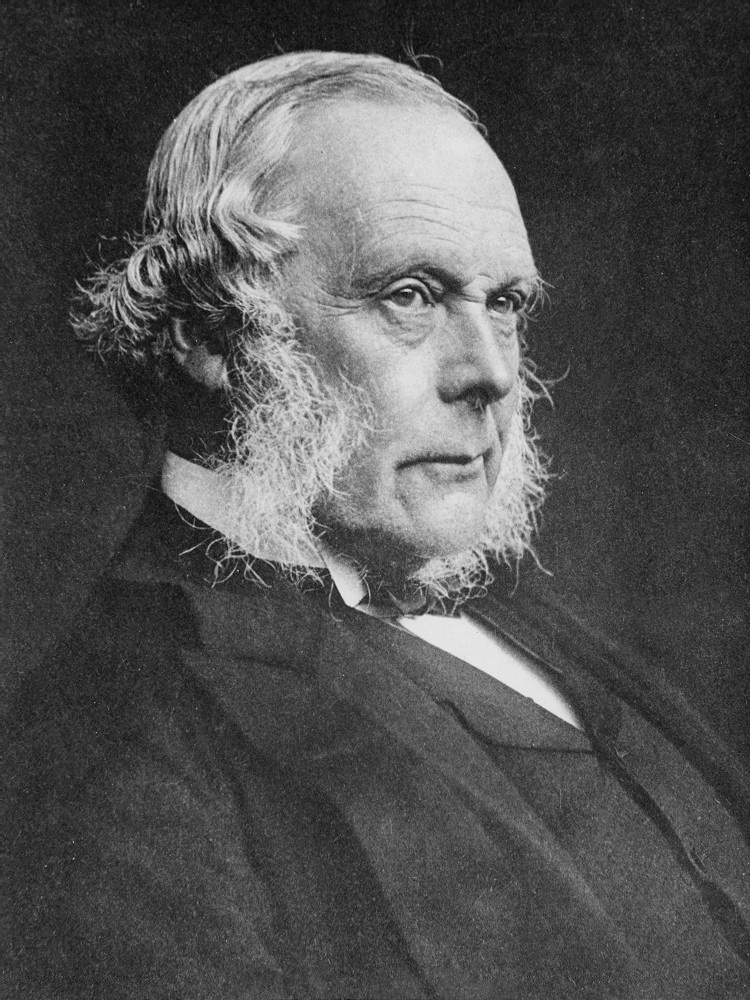
Lord Lister

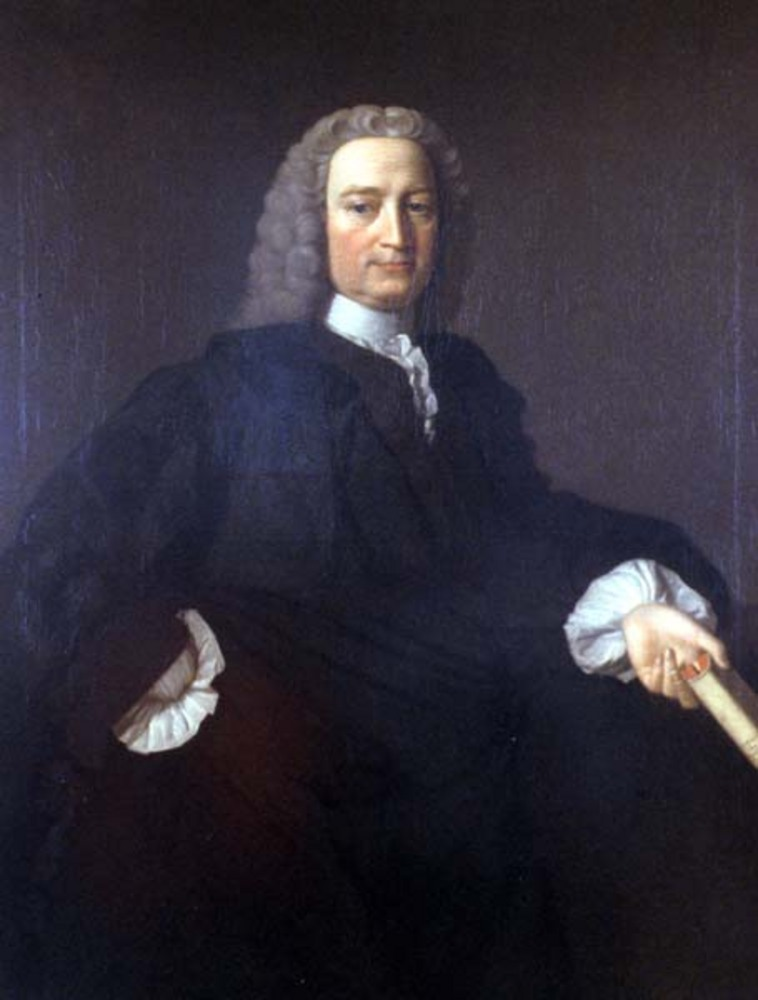
Francis Hutcheson

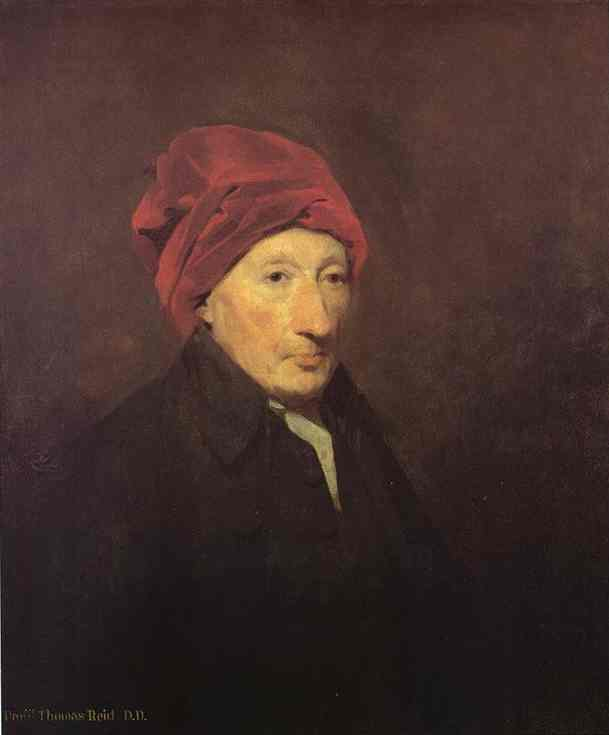
Thomas Reid

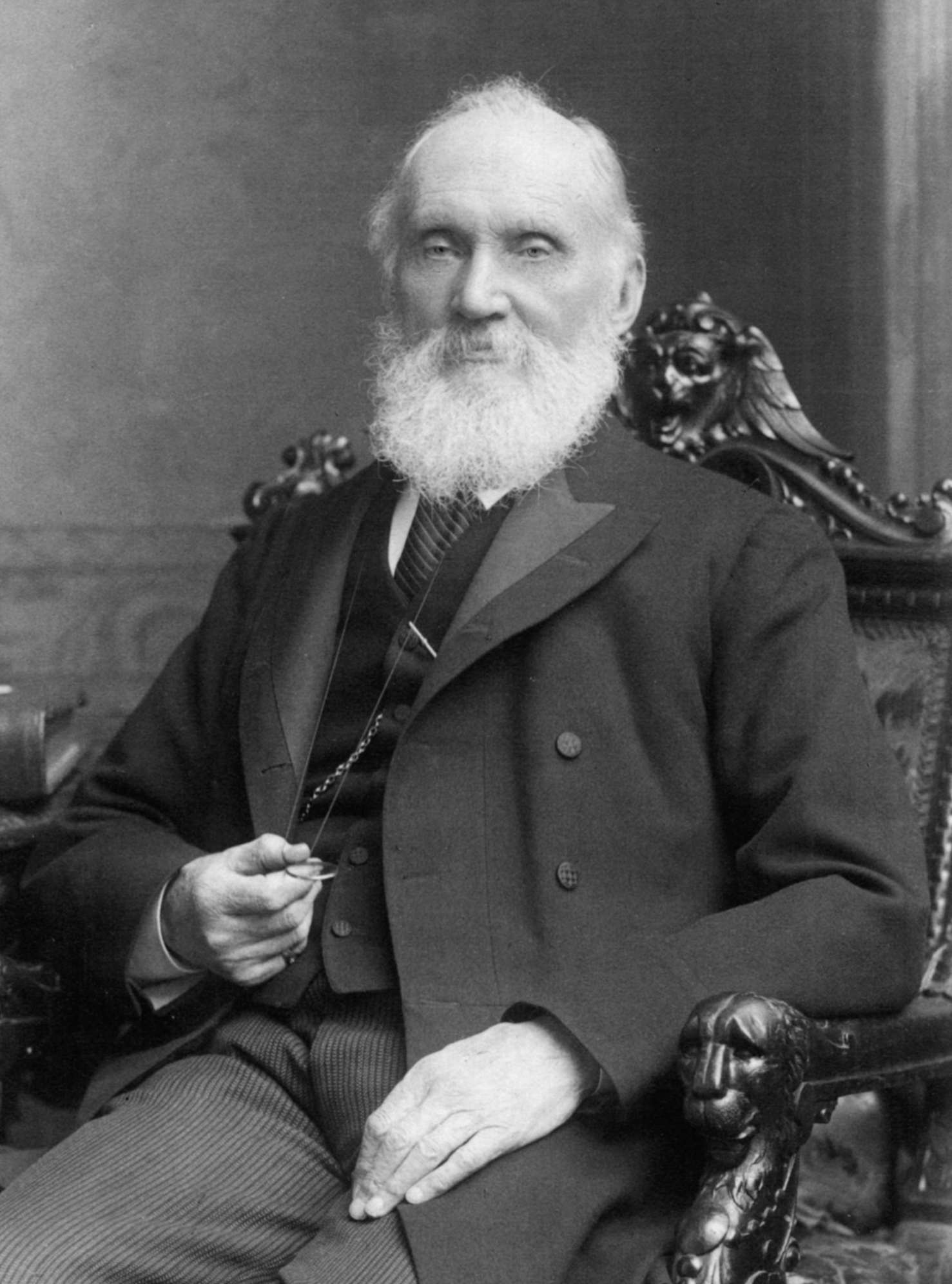
Lord Kelvin

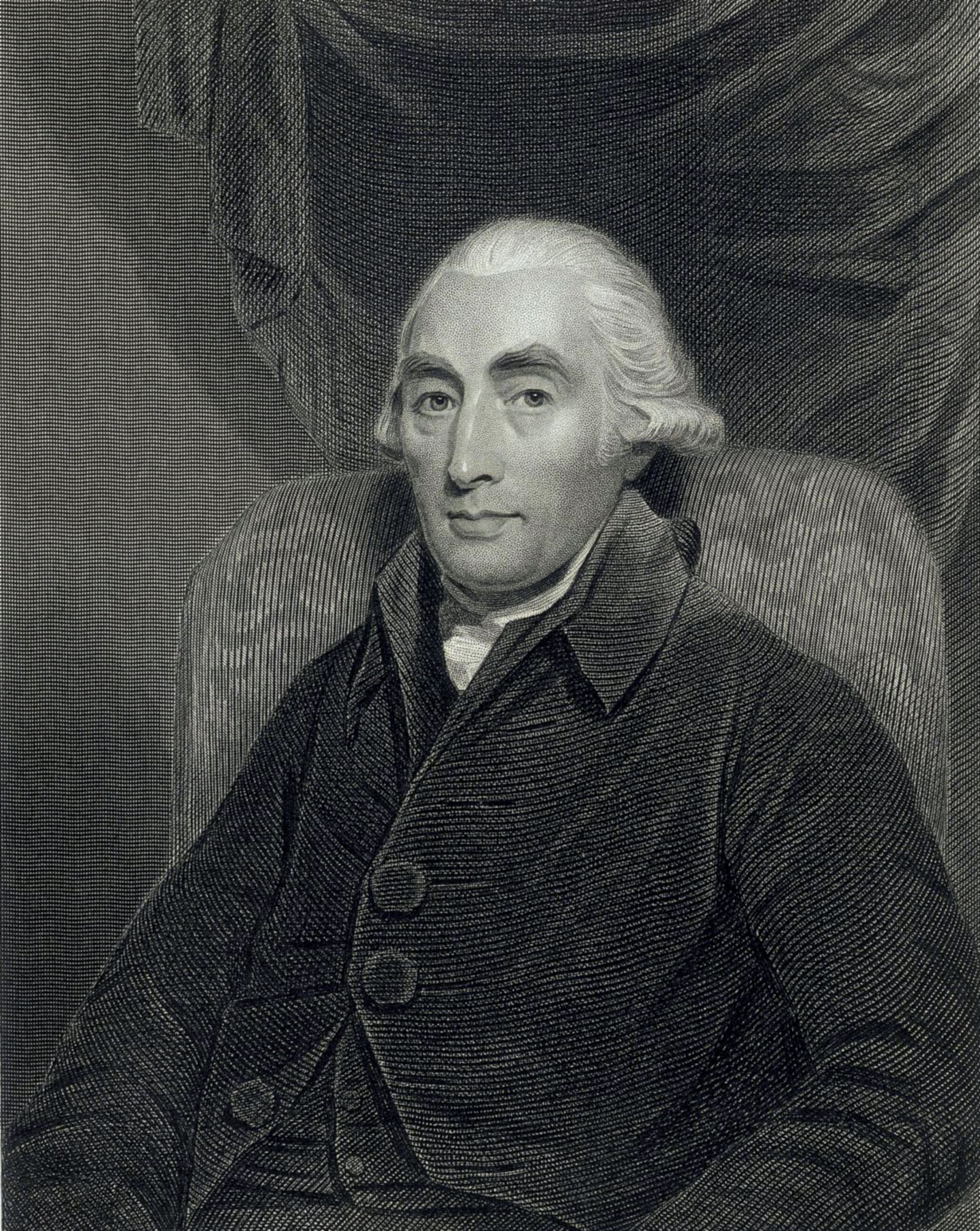
Joseph Black

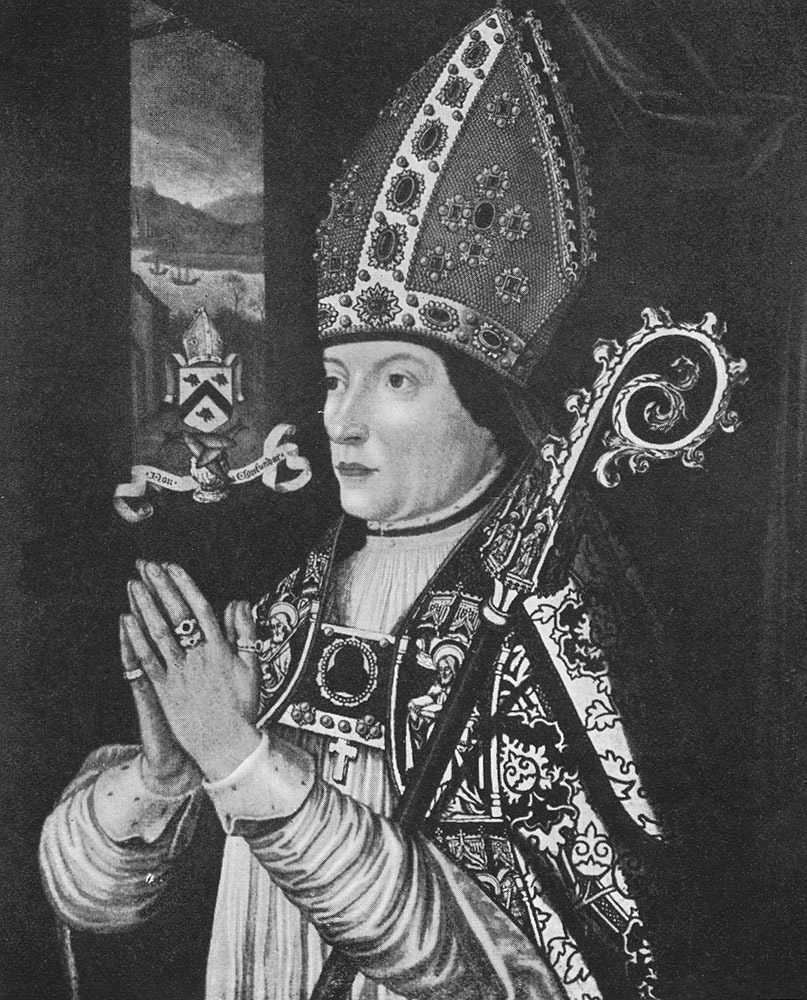
William Elphinstone

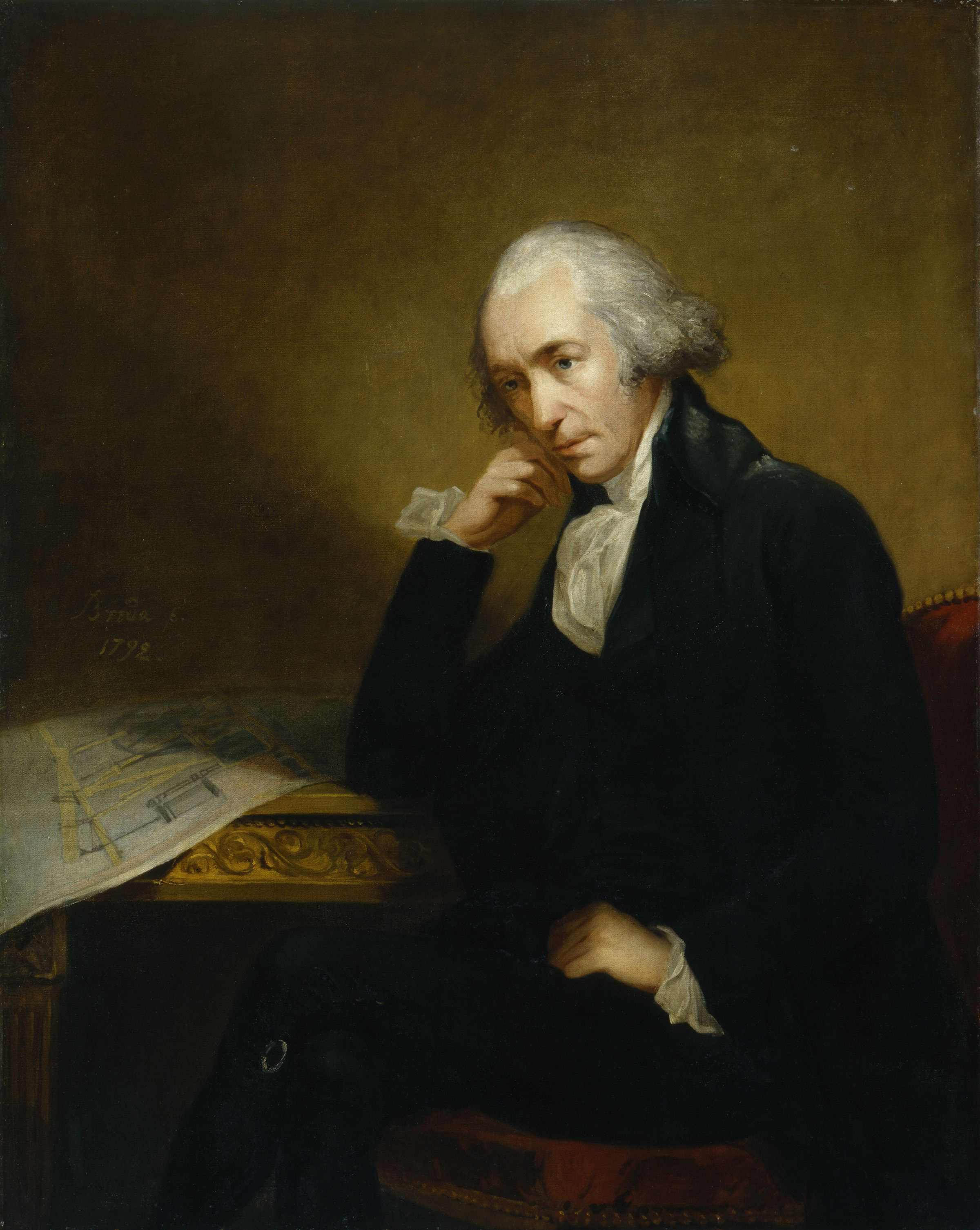
James Watt

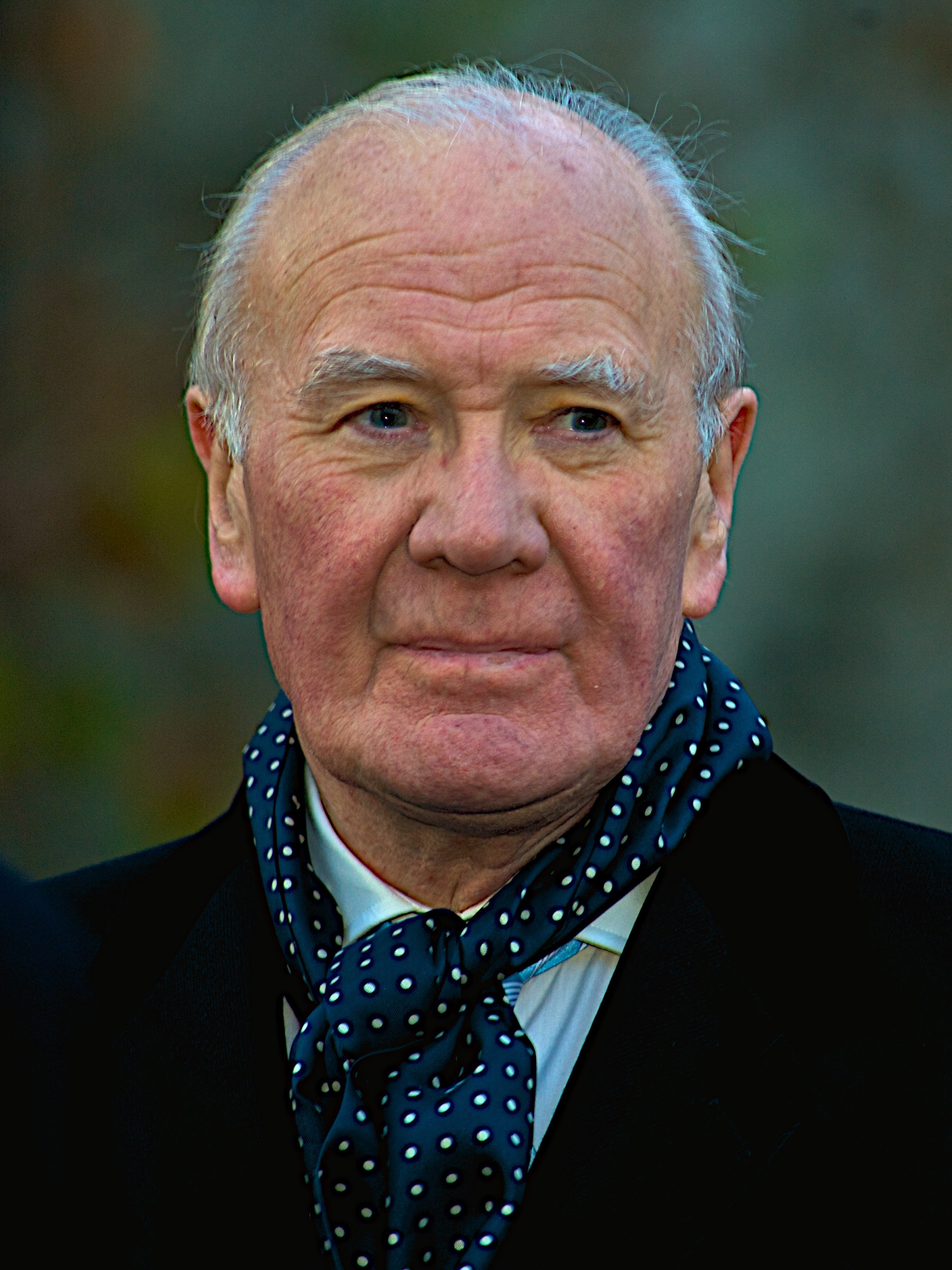
Sir Menzies Campbell

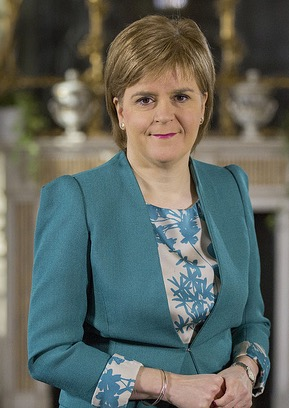
Nicola Sturgeon

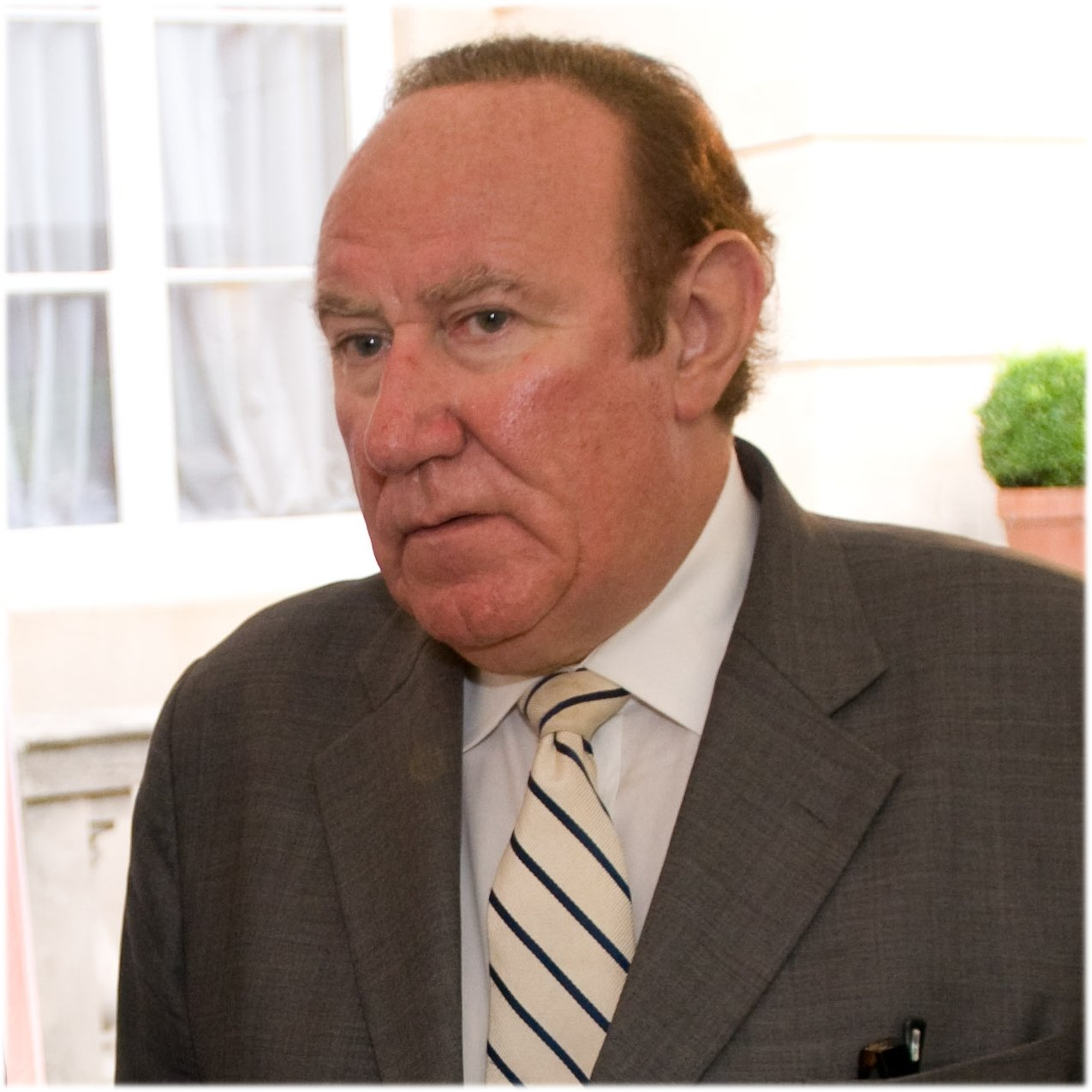
Andrew Neil

=== World Changing Alumni Award ===
With the World-Changing Alumni Award, formerly the Young Alumnus of the Year Award, the university is recognizing and celebrating the achievements of alumni who have graduated within the last 15 years and made a major contribution to the community, arts, sciences, or business.

The award was established in 2001 as part of the university's 550th-anniversary celebrations and is given out once per year. The trophy was donated by the Old Boys of Allan Glen's School, is presented to the winning candidate at one of the year's graduation ceremonies or flagship events.

Winners:

- 2025: Deborah Adeniran (MSc 2024)
- 2024: Vitalii Klymchuk (PGDip 2023)
- 2023: Daniel Crawford (MSc 2013)
- 2022: Dr Nadia Maarouf (MSc 2011)
- 2021: Fiona McPhail (LLB 2007)
- 2020: Selina Hales (MA 2005)
- 2019: Eunice Ntobedzi (MSc 2016)
- 2018: Amal Azzudin (BA 2011, MSc 2014)
- 2017: Susanne Mitschke (MSc 2015); Patrick Renner (MSc 2015)
- 2016: Matt Fountain (MA Hons 2011)
- 2015: Mhairi Black MP (MA 2015)
- 2014: Martin Patience (MA 2002)
- 2013: Karina Atkinson (BSc 2007)
- 2012: Katherine Grainger MBE CBE (MPhil 2001)
- 2011: Emeli Sandé (BSc 2009)
- 2010: Patrick Gunning (BSc 2001, PhD 2005)
- 2009: Euan Murray (BVMS 2003)
- 2008: Mark Beaumont (MA 2006); John Tiffany (MA 1994)
- 2007: Vanessa Munro (LLB 1997, PhD 2001)
- 2006: Richard Dixon (BVMS 1993, PhD 2000)
- 2005: Christopher Brookmyre (MA 1989)
- 2004: Colin McInnes (BSc 1988, PhD 1991)
- 2003: Emma Richards (BSc 1996)
- 2001: Mark Johnston (BVMS 1983); Lorraine Clinton (MA 1986)

== International connections ==
In 2012, the university published online a list of its connections (current and historic) to more than one hundred countries and territories. under the heading "International Story."

The homepage started with a welcome from Vice Principal James C Conroy and features links to all the continents, an interactive map and a list of countries in alphabetical, For each country, the number of "associations" (i e connections) is given - e g Afghanistan has two, Canada has 22, Myanmar 23 and so on.

== See also ==
- Academic dress of the University of Glasgow
- Armorial of UK universities
- Banknotes of Scotland (Gilmorehill featured on design)
- List of medieval universities
- List of universities in the United Kingdom
- Richard Yuill PhD thesis controversy
