= Thomas Innes =

Thomas Innes may refer to:

- Thomas Innes (historian) (1662–1744), Scottish Roman Catholic priest and historian
- Thomas Innes of Learney (1893–1971), Lord Lyon
