= Magnay baronets =

Extinct baronetcy in the Baronetage of the United Kingdom

The Magnay Baronetcy, of Postford House in the County of Surrey, was a title in the Baronetage of the United Kingdom. It was created on 8 November 1844 for William Magnay, a wholesale stationer and Lord Mayor of London from 1843 to 1844. The second Baronet was a novelist. The title became extinct on the death of the third Baronet on 4 September 1960.

Christopher Magnay, father of the first Baronet, was Lord Mayor of London from 1821 to 1822.

== Magnay baronets, of Postford House (1844) ==
- Sir William Magnay, 1st Baronet (1797–1871)
- Sir William Magnay, 2nd Baronet (1855–1917)
- Sir Christopher Boyd William Magnay, 3rd Baronet (1884–1960)

== Arms ==
Coat of arms of Magnay baronets

Crest
A lion rampant Sable billety Erminois murally crowned gorged with a chain reflexed over the back and holding between the forepaws a leopard's face Or.
Escutcheon
Ermine fretty Gules on a chief per pale of the second and Azure a sword Proper pommel and hilt Or surmounting a key saltirewise the ward upwards Gold interlaced with the collar of the Lord Mayor of the City of London between two leopards' faces Erminois.
Motto
Magna Est Veritas
