= Richard Yuill PhD thesis controversy =

Univeristy of Glasgow research controversy

From 1999 to 2004, University of Glasgow post-graduate student Richard Yuill conducted his PhD research on "male adult-youth relationships in contemporary Britain". The research caused a public controversy, and investigations against Yuill by the university and Strathclyde Police, which later concluded with Yuill being cleared of any wrongdoing. He received his doctorate in 2004, and access to his thesis was made restricted.

== Background ==
Richard Yuill joined the University of Glasgow in 1999. He previously served as a teacher at Oban High School until, he said, he was removed for failing to report drug use by two students. The General Teaching Council for Scotland did not release any detail of the incident.

== History ==
In 1999, Yuill conducted his PhD research on "male adult-youth relationships in contemporary Britain", titled "Male age-discrepant intergenerational sexualities and relationships". The study involved interviews with a number of participants, including former members of the Paedophile Information Exchange and the International Paedophile and Child Emancipation association. It was supervised by David Evans.

The research underwent a number of investigations. In 2001, the university started an investigation under the request of secretary Dugald Mackie. A spokesperson for the university stated that "the research topic was approved by the Department of Sociology and the Faculty of Social Sciences on the grounds that it was seen as opening up an important area of research into intergenerational relationships between males which has largely been neglected in academic literature". The research was investigated by the university's senate.

The study was also investigated by Strathclyde Police, which examined transcripts of Yuill's research. As of 2004, access to his thesis had been temporarily withheld, the university stated, by his own accord.

Yuill was cleared of any wrongdoing and received his doctorate in late 2004. The university stated that "[t]his student and his research was the subject of a full investigation by senior university staff. His research material was examined by Strathclyde police who were satisfied that nothing of an illegal nature had taken place".

== Reception ==
Lucy Faithfull Foundation spokesman Donald Findlater criticized the university for restricting access to Yuill's research. He stated that he had "no problem with an exploration of these kinds of views in an academic thesis, but [...] [i]f access is being restricted, how can we make a legitimate assessment of the methodology, the sources and the validity of the work?"

The research was criticized by tabloid newspaper News of the World. Times Higher Education (THE) reported that Yuill had received a number of abusive emails. Yuill said that he and his family were "subjected to offensive phone calls", and that he had "sensitive material stolen from my office and passed on to a journalist". He said that THE had published "false" information about his thesis.

A number of other researchers commented on the Yuill's thesis. London Metropolitan University professor Liz Kelly said in 2004 that "Within its own terms the thesis may be fine but that is not the same question as whether its contents are strong enough to carry such big claims as that made with respect to the age of consent."

== Aftermath ==
Yuill was later employed by Cumbernauld College.

== See also ==
- Rind et al. controversy
