= Sir Christopher Magnay, 3rd Baronet =

English cricketer

Christopher Magnay
Personal information
- Full name: Christopher Boyd William Magnay
- Born: 27 March 1884; Marylebone, London, England
- Died: 4 September 1960 (aged 76); Great Saxham, Suffolk, England
- Batting: Right-handed

Domestic team information
- Years: Team
- 1904: Cambridge University
- 1906–1909: MCC
- 1906–1911: Middlesex
- FC debut: 19 May 1904 Cambridge Univ. v GJV Weigall's XI
- Last FC: 18 May 1911 Middlesex v MCC

Career statistics
| Competition | First-class |
|---|---|
| Matches | 12 |
| Runs scored | 308 |
| Batting average | 14.66 |
| 100s/50s | 0/1 |
| Top score | 73 |
| Balls bowled | 6 |
| Wickets | 0 |
| Bowling average | – |
| 5 wickets in innings | – |
| 10 wickets in match | – |
| Best bowling | – |
| Catches/stumpings | 5/– |
- Source: CricketArchive, April 2012

Sir Christopher Boyd William Magnay, 3rd Baronet, MC (27 March 1884 – 4 September 1960) was an English cricketer who played first-class cricket for Cambridge University in 1904, for Marylebone Cricket Club (MCC) from 1906 to 1909 and for Middlesex from 1906 to 1911.

Magnay was born at Marylebone, London, the son of Sir William Magnay, 2nd Baronet. He was educated at Harrow School and Pembroke College, Cambridge. He played two matches for Cambridge University in 1904. In 1906 he began playing for MCC and also appeared for WG Grace's XI that summer. He made his debut for Middlesex in June 1906 against Sussex. His next match for Middlesex was in 1908 against Gentlemen of Philadelphia. His third and final match for Middlesex was in 1911 against MCC. All his remaining matches were for MCC.

Magnay was a right-handed batsman and played 21 innings in 12 first-class matches at an average of 14.66 and a top score of 73. He bowled one over in the first-class game and took no wickets.

He was also a member at Brokenhurst Manor Golf Club in the New Forest, and won the 1924 Hampshire, Isle of Wight and Channel Islands Amateur Championship, at Southampton's Stoneham Golf Club.

In October 1914 Magnay became lieutenant in the Norfolk Regiment. He served in the First World War, was awarded the Military Cross and reached the rank of major. He succeeded to the baronetcy on the death of his father in 1917. In 1935 he was appointed High Sheriff of Suffolk for 1935-36 and in 1937 he was appointed Deputy Lieutenant of Suffolk.

Magnay lived at Saxham Hall, Great Saxham, Suffolk, where he died in 1960 at the age of 76.

In 1925 Magnay married Winifred Madeline Leigh, daughter of Arthur Frederick Jeffreys and widow of Major Chandos Leigh. They had no children and the baronetcy became extinct on his death.

== Arms ==
Coat of arms of Sir Christopher Magnay, 3rd Baronet

Crest
A lion rampant Sable billety Erminois murally crowned gorged with a chain reflexed over the back and holding between the forepaws a leopard's face Or.
Escutcheon
Ermine fretty Gules on a chief per pale of the second and Azure a sword Proper pommel and hilt Or surmounting a key saltirewise the ward upwards Gold interlaced with the collar of the Lord Mayor of the City of London between two leopards' faces Erminois.
Motto
Magna Est Veritas

Baronetage of the United Kingdom
| Preceded by William Magnay | Baronet (of Postford House); 1917–1960 | Extinct |
