= Thomas Innes (historian) =

Scottish Roman Catholic priest and historian

The Reverend Thomas Innes
- Born: 1662; Drumgask, Aboyne, Scotland
- Died: 28 January 1744 (aged 81–82); Paris, France
- Occupations: priest, historian

Ecclesiastical career
- Church: Roman Catholic
- Ordained: 10 March 1691

Thomas Innes (1662 – 28 January 1744) was a Scottish Roman Catholic priest and historian. He studied at the Scots College, (Paris), of which he became vice-principal. He was the author of two learned works, Critical Essay on the Ancient Inhabitants of the Northern Parts of Britain (1729), and Civil and Ecclesiastical History of Scotland, 80 to 818 (published 1853).

== Life ==
The second son of James Innes, and younger brother of Lewis Innes, he was born at Drumgask in the parish of Aboyne, Aberdeenshire. In 1677 he was sent to Paris, and studied at the College of Navarre. He entered the Scots College on 12 January 1681, but still attended the College of Navarre.

On 26 May 1684 he received the clerical tonsure; on 10 March 1691 was promoted to the priesthood, and afterwards spent a few months at Notre Dame des Vertus, a seminary of the Oratorians near Paris. Returning to the Scots College in 1692, he assisted the principal, his elder brother Lewis, in arranging the records of the church of Glasgow, which had been deposited partly in that college and partly in the Carthusian monastery at Paris by Archbishop James Beaton. In 1694 he graduated M.A. at Paris, and in 1695 matriculated in the German nation. After officiating as a priest for two years in the parish of Magnay in the diocese of Paris, he went again to the Scots College in 1697.

In the spring of 1698 he returned to Scotland, and officiated for three years at Inveravon, Banffshire, as a priest of the Scottish mission. In October 1701 he returned to Paris, and became prefect of studies in the Scots College, and also mission agent. There he spent twenty more years. His friendship with Charles Rollin, Jacques-Joseph Duguet, and Jean Santeul led to his being suspected of Jansenism. In 1720 his brother Lewis, in what may be a formal letter to the vicar-general of the Bishop of Apt, contradicted a report that Thomas had concurred in an appeal to a general council against the condemnation of Pasquier Quesnel's 'Moral Reflections' by Pope Clement XI.

After a long absence he again visited Scotland to collect materials for his 'Essay' and his 'History.' In the winter of 1724 he was at Edinburgh, pursuing his researches in the Advocates' Library. In December 1727 he was appointed vice-principal of the Scots College at Paris, where he died on 28 January 1744.

== Works ==
The results of Innes's researches in Scottish history and antiquities were communicated to scholars who sought his assistance. Francis Atterbury and Thomas Ruddiman were among them, and Robert Keith was given materials for his Catalogue of Scottish Bishops. George Grub wrote that Innes was opposed to ultramontanism, but was not Jansenist as historian.

His works are:

- ‘A Critical Essay on the Ancient Inhabitants of the Northern Parts of Britain or Scotland. Containing an Account of the Romans, of the Britains betwixt the Walls, of the Caledonians or Picts, and particularly of the Scots. With an Appendix of ancient manuscript pieces,’ 2 vols., London, 1729; reprinted, with a Memoir by George Grub, LL.D., in vol. viii. of ‘The Historians of Scotland,’ Edinburgh, 1879. This work elicited an anonymous volume of ‘Remarks’, by George Waddel, Edinburgh, 1733, and 'The Roman Account of Britain and Ireland,' by Alexander Taitt, 1741. Both these replies are reprinted in 'Scotia Rediviva,' 1826, vol. i., and in 'Tracts illustrative of the Antiquities of Scotland,' 1836, vol. i. Innes's reputation mainly rests on this 'Critical Essay.’
- 'Epistola de veteri apud Scotos habendi Synodos modo,' dated Paris, 23 November 1735. In vol. i. of David Wilkins's 'Concilia Magnæ Britanniæ;' reprinted with Innes's 'Civil and Ecclesiastical History.’
- 'The Civil and Ecclesiastical History of Scotland,' edited by George Grub, and printed at Aberdeen for the Spalding Club, 1853, from a manuscript in the possession of James Kyle, bishop of Germanica, and vicar-apostolic of the northern district of Scotland.
- Papers by Innes, and documents connected with his family. In 'Miscellany of the Spalding Club,' ii. 351–80. They include (a) 'Letter to the Chevalier de St. George,' dated 17 October 1729; (b) 'Remarks on a Charter of Prince Henry, son of David I;' (c) 'Of the Salisbury Liturgy used in Scotland.'

Five volumes, mostly in his handwriting, of his manuscript collections in Scottish history, went to the Laing manuscripts in the library of Edinburgh University. A thick quarto volume of collections and dissertations was at Preshome under the charge of Bishop Kyle in 1853. His 'Original Letters,' 1729–33 are the University Library, Edinburgh ('Laing Collections,' No. 346). Several of his letters to the Hon. Harry Maule of Kelly, author of the 'Registrum de Panmure,' are printed in the appendix to John Stuart's edition of that work, 2 vols. Edinburgh, 1874.

The 'Life of King James II' has been attributed to him, but was more probably compiled by his brother, Lewis Innes.

== Legacy ==
The academic journal The Innes Review, published since 1950 by the Scottish Catholic Historical Association, is named after Thomas Innes.

== Sources ==
- Innes, Thomas (1729), A Critical Essay on the Ancient Inhabitants of the Northern Parts of Britain or Scotland, Edinburgh: William Paterson (published 1885)
- Innes, Thomas (c. 1740), The Civil and Ecclesiastical History of Scotland, A.D. 80 to 818, Aberdeen: The Spalding Club (published 1853)
