= Sir William Magnay, 2nd Baronet =

Sir William Magnay, 2nd Baronet (1855 – 8 January 1917) was an English baronet and novelist.

Magnay was a son of Sir William Magnay, 1st Baronet who was Lord Mayor of London. He succeeded to the baronetcy in 1871. He was a prolific novelist, and published twenty-five novels before his death; a further three were brought out posthumously.

Magnay married in 1879, and was himself succeeded by his son Christopher Magnay, born 1884.

== Works ==
Magnay's publications included:

- The Red Chancellor
- Poached Peerage
- Honi Soit: an Original Play in Four Acts (1887)
- The Fall of a Star, a novel (1897)
- The Heiress of the Season (1899)
- Count Zarka; a Romance (1903)
- A Prince of Lovers; a Romance (1905)
- The Master Spirit (1906)
- The Amazing Duke : a Romance (1907)
- The Players: a Tragi-comedy (1913)
- The Cloak of Darkness (1917)
- The Hunt Ball Mystery (1918)

== Arms ==
Coat of arms of Sir William Magnay, 2nd Baronet

Crest
A lion rampant Sable billety Erminois murally crowned gorged with a chain reflexed over the back and holding between the forepaws a leopard's face Or.
Escutcheon
Ermine fretty Gules on a chief per pale of the second and Azure a sword Proper pommel and hilt Or surmounting a key saltirewise the ward upwards Gold interlaced with the collar of the Lord Mayor of the City of London between two leopards' faces Erminois.
Motto
Magna Est Veritas

Baronetage of the United Kingdom
Preceded by William Magnay	Baronet (of Postford House); 1871–1917	Succeeded by Christopher Magnay
