= Sir William Magnay, 1st Baronet =

English merchant and Lord Mayor of London

Sir William Magnay, 1st Baronet (4 March 1795- 3 April 1871) was an English merchant who was Lord Mayor of London in 1843.

Magnay was the son of Christopher Magnay who was Lord Mayor of London from 1821 to 1822. He became a city of London merchant and was a member of the Worshipful Company of Stationers and Newspaper Makers of which company he was master from 1847 to 1848. In 1838 he was elected an alderman of the City of London for Vintry ward. He was Sheriff of London from 1841 to 1842. In 1843, he was elected Lord Mayor of London. He was treasurer of the Honourable Artillery Company from 1843 to 1857.

Magnay was created Baronet of Postford House in the County of Surrey on 8 November 1844. He was a major in the HAC from 1845 to 1848.

Magnay died at the age of 76.

Magnay was the father of William who was a novelist.

== Arms ==
Coat of arms of Sir William Magnay, 1st Baronet

Crest
A lion rampant Sable billety Erminois murally crowned gorged with a chain reflexed over the back and holding between the forepaws a leopard's face Or.
Escutcheon
Ermine fretty Gules on a chief per pale of the second and Azure a sword Proper pommel and hilt Or surmounting a key saltirewise the ward upwards Gold interlaced with the collar of the Lord Mayor of the City of London between two leopards' faces Erminois.
Motto
Magna Est Veritas

Civic offices
Preceded by John Humphery	Lord Mayor of the City of London; 1843	Succeeded by Michael Gibbs
Baronetage of the United Kingdom
New creation	Baronet (of Postford House); 1844–1871	Succeeded by William Magnay
