= Christopher Magnay (lord mayor) =

English merchant and Lord Mayor of London

Christopher Magnay (bapt. 6 October 1767 – 27 October 1826) was an English merchant who was Lord Mayor of London from 1821 to 1822.

Magnay was the son of John Magnay and Ann Liddle of Haltwhistle, Northumberland, where he was baptised in October 1767. He was a City of London merchant and a member of the Worshipful Company of Merchant Taylors. In 1809, he was elected an alderman of the City of London for Vintry ward. He was Sheriff of London from 1813 to 1814. He was master of the Stationers Company from 1816 to 1817. In 1821, he was elected Lord Mayor of London.

Magnay was the father of William Magnay, who was also Lord Mayor of London, in 1843, and became a baronet.

Civic offices
Preceded by John Thomas Thorp	Lord Mayor of the City of London; 1821-1822	Succeeded by Sir William Heygate, 1st Baronet
