= 2011 Hetherington House Occupation =

Anti-austerity protest at the University of Glasgow, Scotland

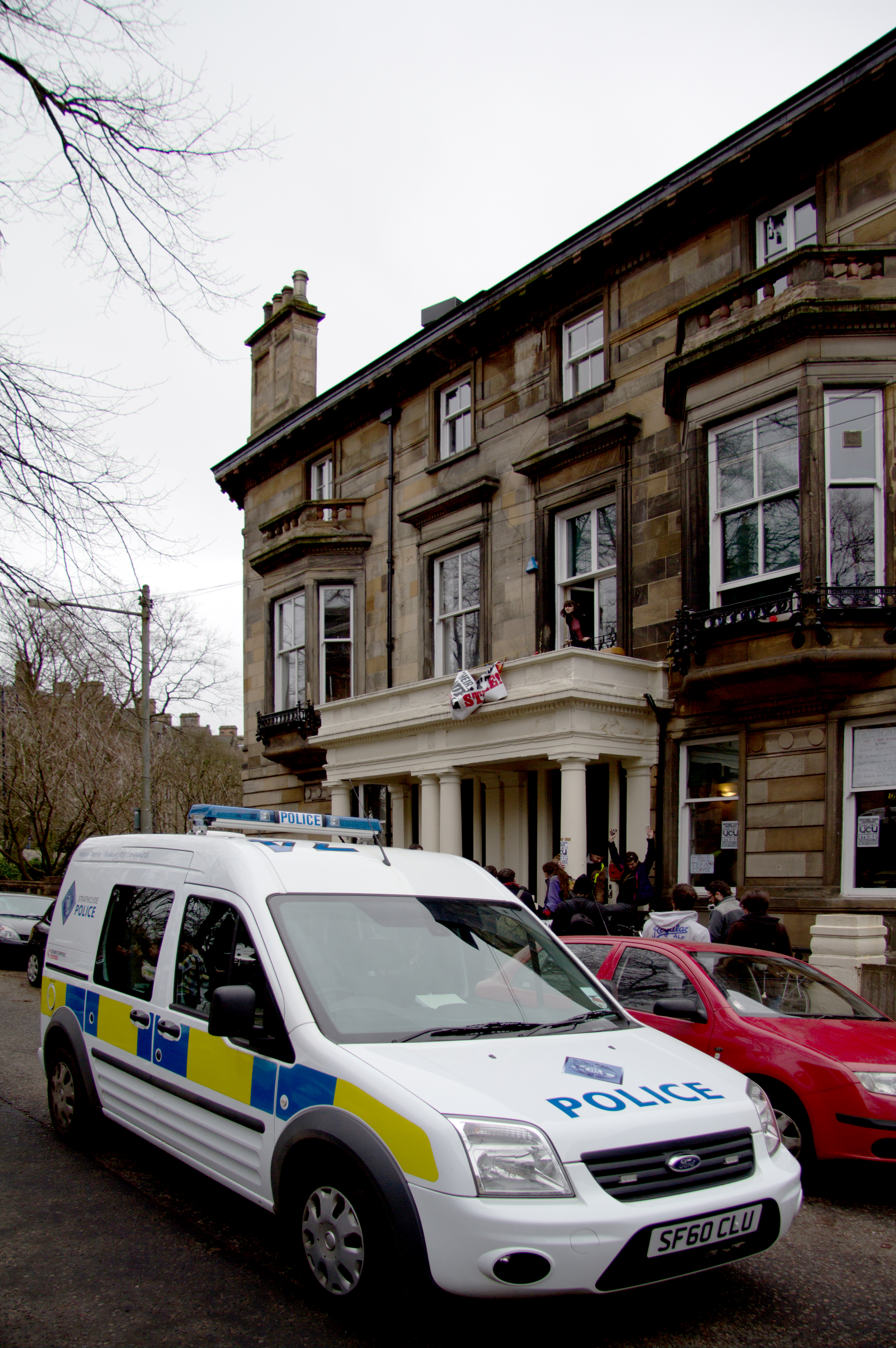
A police van outside Hetherington House during the eviction on 22 March 2011

The 2011 occupation of Hetherington House at the University of Glasgow, Glasgow, Scotland, was a student, staff and community anti-austerity protest from 1 February to 31 August 2011. It became one of the longest-running student occupations in the context of the wider movement of student protests in the UK in 2010 and 2011 United Kingdom anti-austerity protests.

The occupation was referred to by the occupants as the 'Free Hetherington'. Its purpose was to protest against cuts to higher education within Glasgow University and nationwide. The occupation hosted several talks and discussion sessions. It triggered debate about the legitimacy of protest action versus consultation with University management. One manifestation of this was a debate hosted by the University Dialectic Society on the utility of the occupation's approach. Ultimately, the university implemented some of its proposed cuts, though its plans were scaled back in some areas, although this was not directly related to the protest. The occupation ended peacefully at noon on 31 August 2011, after an agreement between the occupation and University management.

== Hetherington House ==
Hetherington House, at 13 University Gardens, was acquired by the university in 1956. The building was formerly used as a place for postgraduate students and staff to meet, and is believed to have been the first University Research Club of its kind established in the UK. The building was named after Hector Hetherington, principal of the university between 1936 and 1961. Its final incarnation was as the Hetherington Research Club (HRC), which additionally permitted mature student membership alongside staff and postgraduates.

The Hetherington Research Club ceased operating in February 2010 due to financial problems. The university later stated that they were unwilling to continue supporting the club after the Student Finance Sub-Committee rejected two proposed business plans on the grounds that they lacked financial viability. The building was largely unused until the occupation commenced on 1 February 2011, but was scheduled to be redeveloped by the university.

== The occupation ==
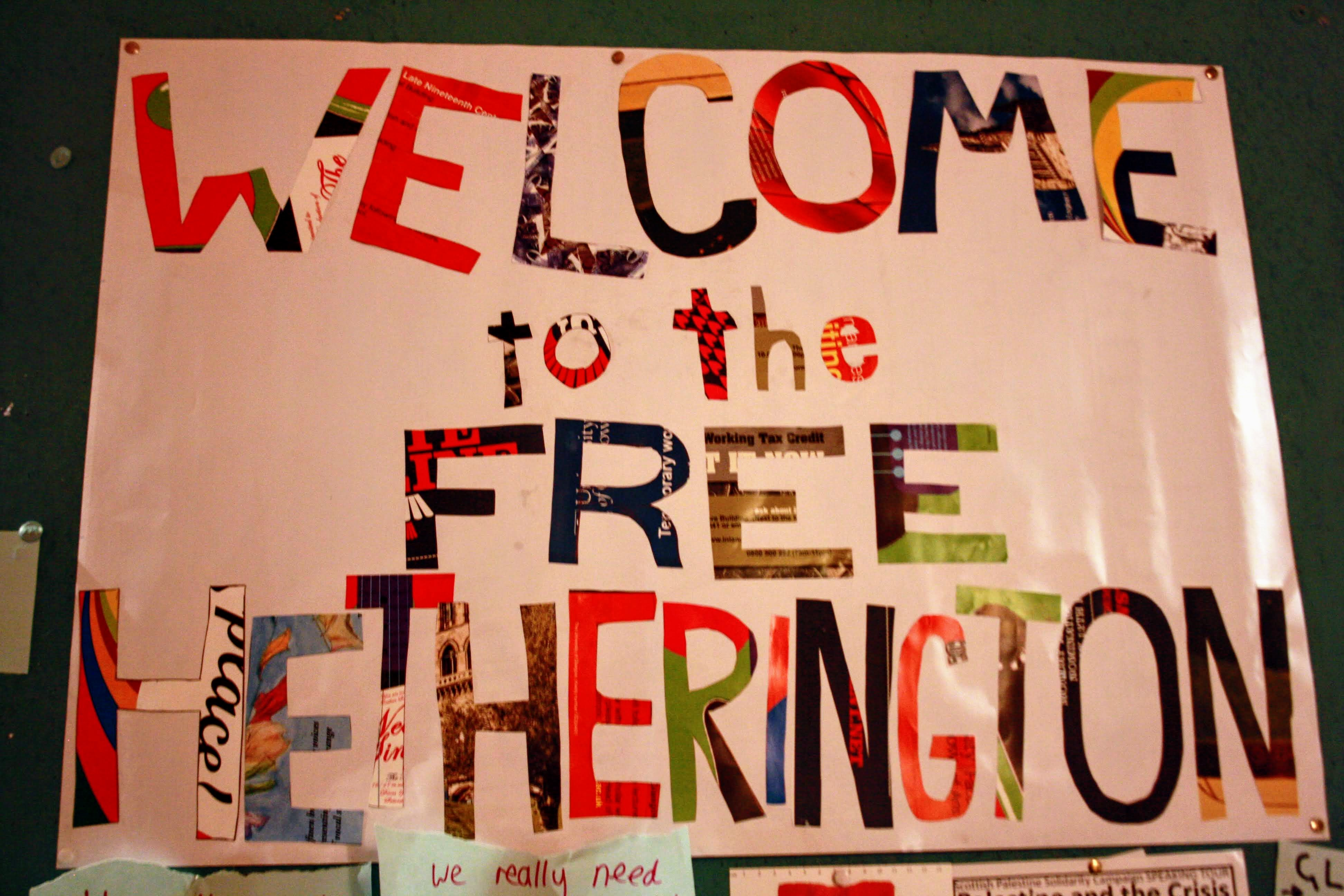
Welcome sign in the entrance of the occupation

The occupation maintained a schedule of film screenings, talks, workshops and performances since the start of February. The occupation met 3 times each week to discuss progress and future direction.

Several notable figures visited and supported the occupation including Scottish Green politicians Patrick Harvie (MSP) and Martha Wardrop (councillor), singer-songwriter Billy Bragg, singer-songwriter David Rovics, Scottish Makar Liz Lochhead, writer A. L. Kennedy comedian Mark Steel, Scottish poet Tom Leonard (poet), comedian Josie Long, comedian Jeremy Hardy, writer Louise Welsh, writer Owen Jones and film and television director Ken Loach.

=== Criticism ===
The occupation faced criticism from groups and individuals on campus including both of the university's Student Unions, the Glasgow University Union (GUU) and Queen Margaret Union (QMU), and the Students' Representative Council(SRC). Some members of the SRC issued, but later withdrew, an emergency motion calling for disciplinary action against the occupiers. Chris Sibbald, president of the GUU, claimed that "They are undermining all the hard work we have been doing and the majority of students believe the students in the Hetherington are a distraction and are costing us time and money."

On 12 February 2011, a group of individuals associated with the occupation 'kettled' Aaron Porter, the then president of the National Union of Students while he was at the university, claiming that they were doing so to criticise his refusal to condemn police kettling tactics. The QMU and the GUU subsequently issued a statement condemning the behaviour and apparent lack of accountability in the organisation, citing the Aaron Porter incident as an example of this.

=== Conflicts with students ===
On 6 March 2011 several students clashed with the occupiers. The group, including several who were allegedly members of the GUU Board of Management, were accused by the activists of removing banners, stripping naked and activating a fire alarm. The GUU distanced itself, saying that anyone who was involved was not acting as a representative of the union.

One student attempted to film an occupation meeting. In a subsequent interview with Subcity Radio, the student claimed that occupation members pushed him to the floor trying to take the camera from him when he refused to cease filming. He said that he was only allowed to leave after he threatened to call the police.

=== Eviction and reoccupation ===
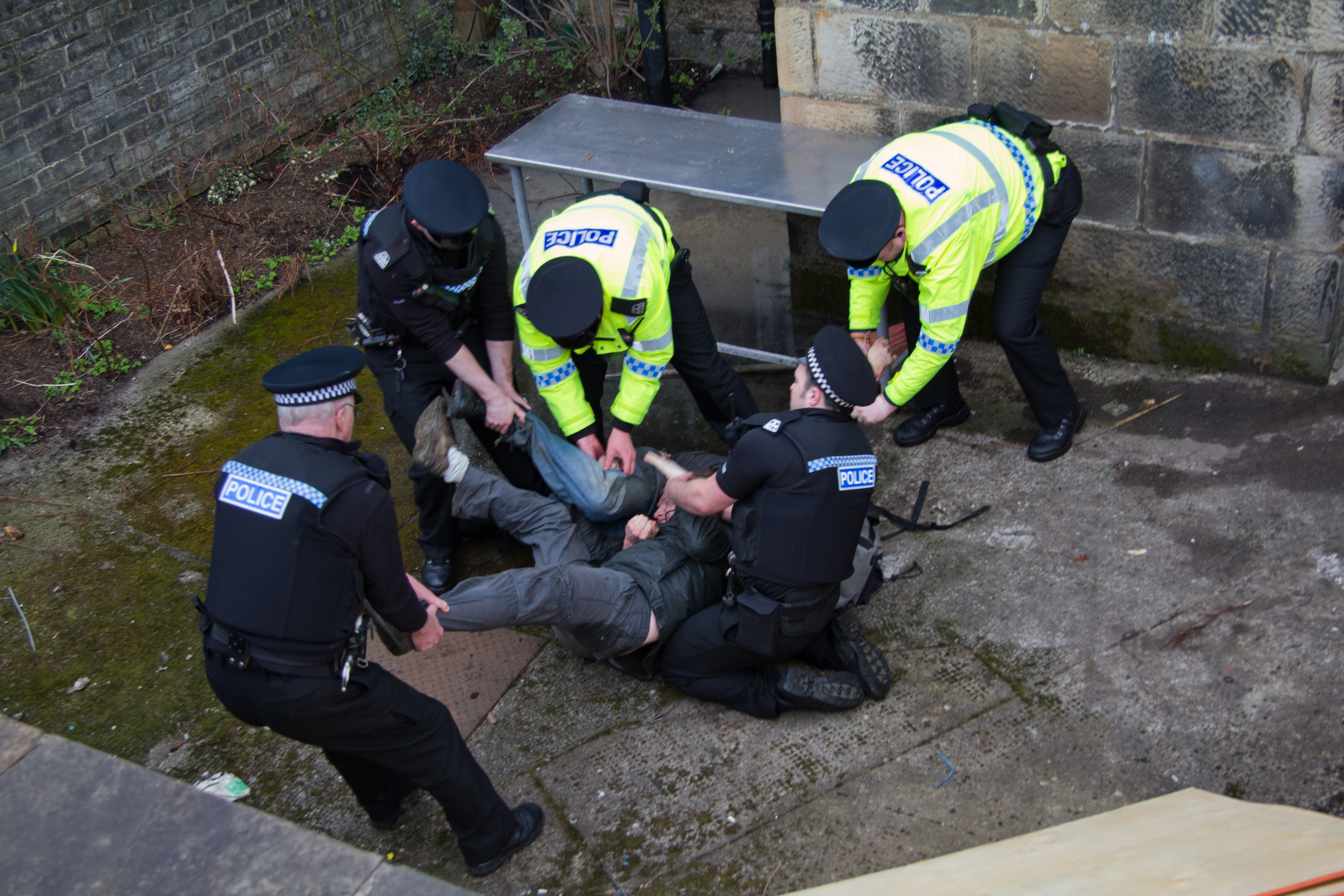
Two men are removed by police officers from the back door area of Hetherington House during the eviction on 22 March 2011

On 22 March 2011, the university made the decision to ask the occupiers to voluntarily leave. When the occupiers refused and informed supporters, crowds started to gather outside Hetherington House and Strathclyde Police were called by university security to assist. When students were forcibly removed from the premises, the remaining occupiers agreed to leave. In response to the eviction, a subsequent protest on the same day occupied the Senate and management suite of the university. After negotiations, the university offered occupiers the option of returning to Hetherington House, an offer which they accepted.

The decision made by the police to forcibly remove some students from the premises during the eviction attracted criticism, after some involved were injured. Around 100 members of staff/students openly criticised the eviction. Some academics at the university called for an independent inquiry into the eviction and the immediate resignation of the university's senior management group. Tommy Gore, president of the SRC, condemned the police presence on campus. Strathclyde Police have described calls that the police presence was disproportionate as "ridiculous". Patrick Harvie, member of the Scottish Parliament condemned the actions of the university and Strathclyde Police, and Scottish Green Party Councillor Martha Wardrop said the police's role "served to inflame a volatile situation".

In response to the criticism, the university launched an independent inquiry into the eviction. The Hetherington Enquiry report was published on 9 September 2011. The enquiry found that although the police had the authority to make the decision to remove students from the building, they did not have to make such a decision. The enquiry report states that it would have been more appropriate for the university to have acquired a court order if its aim was to remove people from the premises.

=== Cost of the occupation ===
The Glasgow University Guardian reported that, between 1 February and 20 April 2011, the estimated cost of the occupation to the university was almost £10,000. These costs were divulged in a Freedom of Information (FOI) release requested by the newspaper, detailing approximate utility costs, a maximum cost for the replacement of a window in the Gilbert Scott building that was damaged during the eviction on 22 March, and an approximate calculation of security staff costs based on overtime hours billed up to the date of the FOI request. The occupants responded by saying they did not recognize the method of calculating these costs, and by stating that it is not legitimate to criticise the right to protest because of cost.

Additionally, the University of Glasgow stated that the occupation was preventing plans to re-develop the building for academic use.

== Conclusion ==
After negotiation with members of the occupation, the Glasgow University Senior Management Group offered the following terms, which the occupation voted on and agreed to: 1. No more course cuts. 2. No compulsory redundancies. 3. A new postgraduate club, to be opened in the next year. 4. No cuts for student services, a guarantee of transparency with the SRC (Student Representative Council). 5. A public meeting with the principal Anton Muscatelli, where students and staff may address their worries. 6. No repercussions from the university for staff or students involved in the occupation. 7. An assurance that no information will be volunteered to the police about people involved.

The occupation ended at noon on 31 August 2011.

== See also ==
- University of Glasgow
- 2010 UK student protests
- 2011 United Kingdom protests
- 2011 United Kingdom anti-austerity protests
- Occupation (protest)
