= Academic dress of the University of Glasgow =

Academic dress at the University of Glasgow is worn at ceremonial events throughout the academic year. This primarily entails graduations, but includes Commemoration Day, church services, and the installation of Chancellors and Rectors of the University. The academic dress of all members of the University of Glasgow, including students, is regulated by the University Regulations. It shares many similarities with the other ancient universities of Scotland, most conspicuously that, unlike in the rest of the United Kingdom, headwear is only very rarely worn. Academic dress has been worn in the University of Glasgow since medieval times.

== Officers of the University ==
The Chancellor wears a gown of "black watered silk, with long closed sleeves and square collar, trimmed with gold lace and gold frogs." There is also a black velvet trencher cap with a gold tassle, although this is very rarely worn.

The Vice-Chancellor, normally the Principal (for whom see below), wears identical dress but with silver trimmings, frogs and tassel. (The position of Vice-Chancellor at the Scottish universities is not analogous to that in England; see Chancellor of the University of Glasgow.)

The Rector wears a gown of "black cloth, with square collar and full-length capelike sleeves: five gold bands on each sleeve". He has an identical cap to the Chancellor, although does not wear it.

The Principal wears a gown of "purple silk, with open sleeves, facings of black silk and a border of purple velvet." This gown is rarely worn as the Principal acts as Vice-Chancellor for most ceremonial events.

The Dean of Faculties, an honorary position, is entitled to wear a gown of "black silk, with square velvet collar, full-length capelike sleeves and velvet frogs."

Members of the University Court are entitled to wear frogs on the sleeves of their gowns.

== Staff ==
Academic dress is not prescribed for members of the academic staff of the University, who wear the gown and hood proper to their highest degree. The only other member of staff to wear ceremonial dress is the Bedellus, the head of the janitorial staff, who carries the Mace at ceremonial events and wears a black gown with gold trimmings and faced with the University badge.

== Graduates ==
Along with the hood appropriate to their degree, Bachelors wear "black stuff [gowns], with open pointed sleeves reaching to the foot of the gown", whilst Masters wear gowns of "black silk or stuff, with cord and button on the yoke and closed sleeves (with horizontal arm-slit) reaching to the foot of the gown and ending in a crescent shaped cut (the points of the crescent facing back)." Note that the ancient universities of Scotland, including Glasgow, award the degree of Master of Arts as a first degree; graduands to receive a Master of Arts degree as their first degree therefore wear the master's gown but with the appropriate hood pertaining to their undergraduate degree. Doctors of Philosophy (PhD) wear as Undress Black silk or stuff, with a collar falling over the yoke and full sleeves half the length of the gown. on top of this there are facings of crimson silk.

== Undergraduates ==
Undergraduate students are entitled, as at the other ancient universities of Scotland, to wear a scarlet gown with full sleeves half the length of the gown. The Calendar permits students to add "a narrow band of silk on the breast of each side of the gown of the colour of the hood-lining proper to the lowest degree in the Faculty", although the former Faculties of the University have now been removed and replaced by a structure of Colleges.

Officers of the Glasgow University Union and Queen Margaret Union, the Sports Association and the Students' Representative Council have their own gowns, as do those of some societies, including the Dialectic Society, Conservative Association and Medico-Chirurgical Society.

== See also ==
- Ede & Ravenscroft – official dressmakers to the University
