= Glasgow University Student Television =

Glasgow University Student Television (more commonly known as GUST) is the student television station at the University of Glasgow and the oldest student-run television station in the world, founded in 1964. GUST is affiliated with the National Student Television Association (NaSTA) and broadcasts a wide range of programmes, including creative and factual as well as annual Freshers’ Week coverage. It is one of the four mediums of student media at the University of Glasgow, along with the Glasgow Guardian, Glasgow University Magazine and Subcity Radio.

== History ==
=== Founding ===
During interviews with current staff of the Media Production Unit at Glasgow University, it was revealed that the university's Television Service began operating in 1963. However, it is believed that Glasgow University Student Television (GUST) was founded in 1964. It is unclear when the name GUST was actually created, but it began being commonly used in the 1970s.

This means that GUST was the first student television station to be founded in the United Kingdom, and also the oldest student television station in Europe. There is a station in the United States that was founded before GUST, but this station was staff run for students. Thus, GUST is the oldest student-run television station in the world.

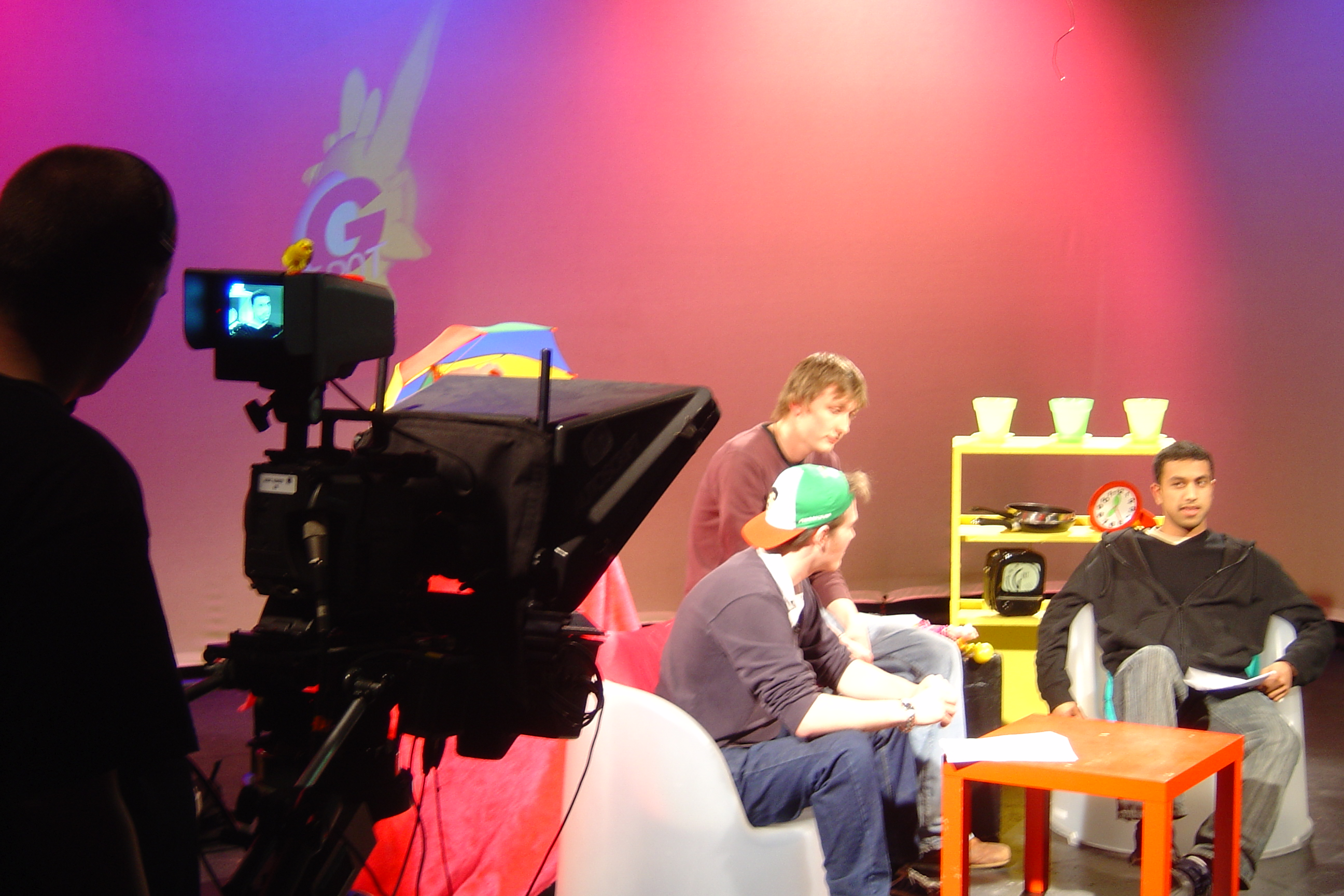
Content being produced during a weekly GUST studio at Southpark House, Glasgow

Between 1966 and 1968, Glasgow University built a television studio in the basement of Southpark House in order to support teaching facilities. It was hoped that this new facility would be used for a student operated TV service made by students. This marked the beginning of GUST as a broadcasting station. To this day, GUST hold their weekly studios in these facilities to create videos.

=== 1960s–1990s ===
GUST would originally broadcast a weekly live programme on a Friday lunchtime, cleverly titled “Lunchtime Friday,” which would run for about an hour and would be shown at 12:10pm and repeated at 1:10pm every Friday during term time. This content would be broadcast on the university's cable network so GUST programmes would reach every building on campus, and also many others outside the university, on a network rented by British Relay. That then means GUST was broadcasting on the biggest cable network in Europe at the time.

The earliest surviving video footage of GUST is from approximately 1970, with its output consisting of comedy sketches and live band performances.

GUST was a founding member of the National Student Television Association (NaSTA), helping establish the first awards ceremony in 1973. Notable past GUSTies include Steven Moffat and Andrew Neil, both of whom were members of the station during their time at the University of Glasgow.

In 1979, GUST started colour broadcasts and attracted its highest audience so far in 1980 with an interview given to Def Leppard. In 1985, the University bought the cable network from British Relay for £1. In later years, GUST made several technological upgrades and was given the approval by the BBC to be featured on a student television theme night on BBC Choice in early 2000.

=== Present day ===
GUST is shown on television screens around campus but also broadcasts their programming on their own website, gust.tv, which it has done since 2005. Alongside ongoing coverage of student life and goings-on in Glasgow as a whole, they cover Freshers' Week every year, including events organised by the Students' Representative Council, Glasgow University Union, Glasgow University Sports Association and Queen Margaret Union. Notably, GUST produces a Freshers' Guide each year that is streamed at the Freshers' Address given on the Monday of Freshers' Week.

In 2014, the university's production studio at Southpark House was upgraded to a full HD studio. GUST produces a variety of programmes, ranging from interviews with musicians and documentaries on cosplay and mental health, as well as much more. Some recent GUST series include Miscellanea, Surround Sound Live, Creative Conflict and Experimental Shorts.

== Structure ==
GUST is managed by an executive team named the Top 4, composed of the Controller (the head of the station), Head of Creative Programming, Head of Factual Programming and Head of Technical. Unlike most British student television stations, the station chose to keep the name "Controller" as opposed to "Station Manager" to reflect the historical name for that position at the BBC. Producers, coordinators and convenors fall under the supervision of one of the members of the Top 4. There are four Creative producerships (Arts, Comedy/Drama, Music and Lifestyle), four Factual producerships (Clubs/Societies, News, Science and Sports), three technical positions (Assistant Technical Coordinator, Webmaster and Animation Producer) and three organisational positions (Social Convenor, Broadcast/Publicity Coordinator and Fundraising Convenor). Whilst producers focus on the creation of content, the various coordinators and convenors assist with the general functioning of the station.

== Awards ==
Along with the many NaSTA awards that GUST has been able to obtain over the years, there are also many other awards that GUST have been fortunate enough to receive.

In 1977 and 1978, GUST won Best Float in the Charity's float competition. Their prize was a barrel of beer and GUST came out and apologised if this prize affected their video quality in any way.

In 1995, GUST were awarded 'The Stanley's: The Next Big Thing' in the Student category by the Royal Television Society. In 1998, two of GUST's videos were selected to be screened at the University of Glasgow International Student Film and Video Festival. These programmes were the Best of G-Spot and Best of GUST.

In 2005, GUST won the Best Drama and Best Documentary awards at NaSTA.

In 2016, GUST won Most Dedicated Member: Sarah Battensby (GUST) in Volunteering, Clubs and Societies Awards at the University of Glasgow.

At the most recent edition of the NaSTA awards (2019, Nottingham), GUST won Best Documentary & Factual. In 2018 (Sheffield) they received three Highly Commended awards for Best Writing, Best On-Screen Talent and Best Freshers' Coverage, and in 2017 (Birmingham) they won Best Male and Best Ident as well as received two Highly Commended awards for Best Open and Best Station Marketing.
