= Meta Ramsay, Baroness Ramsay of Cartvale =

British politician, diplomat and life peer (1936–2026)

The Right Honourable The Baroness Ramsay of Cartvale
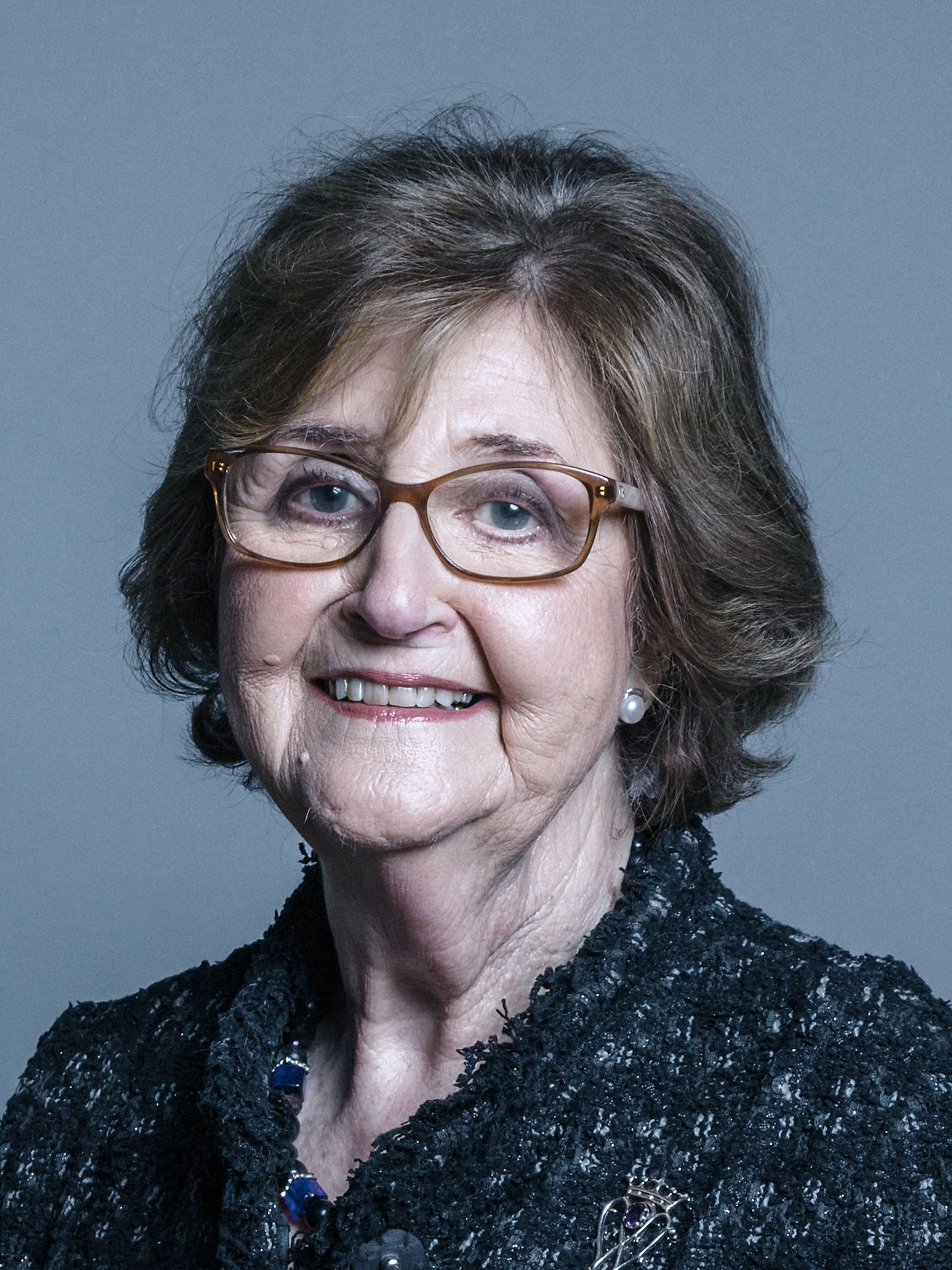

Member of the House of Lords
- Lord Temporal
- Life peerage 11 October 1996 – 28 May 2026

Personal details
- Born: Margaret Mildred Ramsay; 12 July 1936 Glasgow, Scotland
- Died: 28 May 2026 (aged 89) Glasgow, Scotland
- Party: Labour
- Education: University of Glasgow, Graduate Institute of International Studies

Margaret Mildred Ramsay, Baroness Ramsay of Cartvale (12 July 1936 – 28 May 2026), commonly known as Meta Ramsay, was a British politician and diplomat who was a Labour Party member of the House of Lords from 1996 until her death in 2026.

== Early life and career ==
Ramsay was born in Glasgow, Scotland on 12 July 1936. She was educated at the University of Glasgow and the Graduate Institute of International Studies, Geneva. Whilst at Glasgow she served as President of the Students' Representative Council, wrote for the then Gilmorehill Guardian, and was a member of the Dialectic Society. Ramsay served in the British diplomatic service from 1969 to 1991. A fluent Russian speaker, having studied with Elizabeth Smith, wife of the late John Smith, she was a well-respected case officer with Britain's Secret Intelligence Service (SIS/MI6). She served with distinction in Stockholm and in Helsinki where, as the SIS Head of Station, she was involved in the successful exfiltration of the former KGB Colonel Oleg Gordievsky. A news article states that SIS will neither confirm nor deny they ever employed Ramsay.

A contemporary of Sir John Scarlett, the chief of SIS from 2004 to 2009, she was short-listed to succeed an earlier MI6 chief – Sir Colin McColl, though at that time, 1994, she lost out to Sir David Spedding, left the Service and moved into full-time politics.

She was foreign policy adviser to John Smith, Leader of the Labour Party from 1992–94, and was special adviser to Jack Cunningham, Shadow Secretary of State for Trade and Industry 1994–95.

== Parliamentary career ==
Ramsay was made a life peer as Baroness Ramsay of Cartvale, of Langside in the City of Glasgow, on 11 October 1996.

Between 1998 and 2001, Ramsay was Baroness in Waiting (Whip); Spokesperson of the Scottish Office; Spokesperson of Foreign and Commonwealth Affairs; and Spokesperson of Culture, Media and Sports; in the Lords. In 2002 she was appointed Deputy Speaker of the House of Lords (one Deputy Speaker from a panel of 20 to 25 Deputy Speakers preside over debates when the Lord Speaker is not present).

In 2005 she was appointed a member of the Intelligence and Security Committee, which provides parliamentary oversight of the Secret Intelligence Service (MI6), GCHQ and the Security Service (MI5). She served on the Committee until 2007. She was an advisory council member of the foreign-policy think-tank, the Foreign Policy Centre.

She was the chair of Labour Friends of Israel in the House of Lords.

== Death ==
Ramsay died from cancer in Glasgow, on 28 May 2026, aged 89.
