= Charles Kennedy =

British politician (1959–2015)

The Right Honourable Charles Kennedy
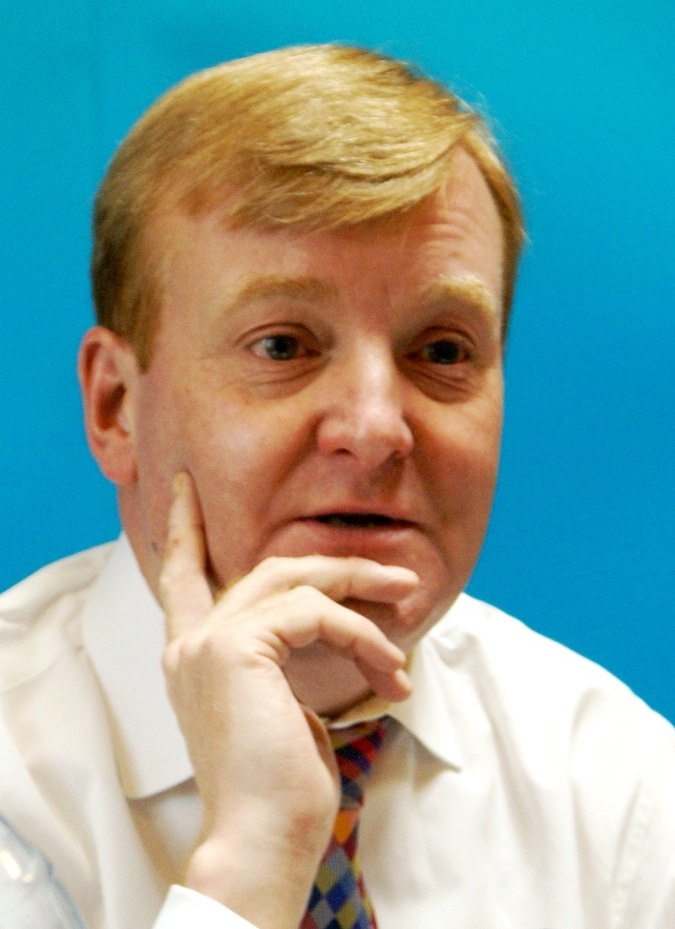
- Kennedy in 2006

Leader of the Liberal Democrats
- In office 9 August 1999 – 7 January 2006
- Deputy: Menzies Campbell; Alan Beith
- Preceded by: Paddy Ashdown
- Succeeded by: Menzies Campbell

President of the Liberal Democrats
- In office 1 January 1991 – 31 December 1994
- Leader: Paddy Ashdown
- Preceded by: Ian Wrigglesworth
- Succeeded by: Robert Maclennan
Frontbench portfolios
1997–1999	Agriculture and Rural Affairs
1992–1997	Foreign and Commonwealth Affairs
1989–1992	Health

Member of Parliament for Ross, Skye and Lochaber Ross, Skye and Inverness West (1997–2005) Ross, Cromarty and Skye (1983–1997)
- In office 9 June 1983 – 30 March 2015
- Preceded by: Constituency established
- Succeeded by: Ian Blackford

Personal details
- Born: Charles Peter Kennedy; 25 November 1959 Inverness, Scotland
- Died: 1 June 2015 (aged 55) Fort William, Scotland
- Party: Liberal Democrats (from 1988)
- Other political affiliations: SDP (1981–1988); Labour (1974–1981)
- Spouse: Sarah Gurling (m. 2002; div. 2010)
- Children: 1
- Education: University of Glasgow (MA)

Charles Peter Kennedy (25 November 1959 – 1 June 2015) was a Scottish politician who served as Leader of the Liberal Democrats from 1999 to 2006, and was the Member of Parliament (MP) for Ross, Skye and Lochaber from 1983 to 2015.

Kennedy was elected to the House of Commons in 1983 as a member of the Social Democratic Party, and after the SDP–Liberal Alliance merged into the Liberal Democrats, became the party's president. Following the resignation of Paddy Ashdown in August 1999, Kennedy became the party's leader. He led the party in the 2001 and 2005 general elections, increasing its number of seats in the House of Commons to their highest level since 1923, led his party's opposition to the Iraq War, and broadly positioned the party to the left of New Labour. A charismatic and affable speaker in public, he appeared extensively on television during his leadership.

During the latter stages of Kennedy's leadership, there was concern about both his leadership and his health. From December 2005, some within the party were openly questioning his position and calling for a leadership election. On 5 January 2006, he was informed that ITN would be reporting that he had received treatment for alcoholism; he pre-empted the broadcast by admitting that he had had treatment, and resigned as leader the following day after receiving no support within the parliamentary party. After Menzies Campbell succeeded him as leader, Kennedy remained in office as a backbench MP, where he voted against the formation of the Cameron–Clegg coalition. He died less than a month after losing his seat in the House of Commons in 2015.

== Early life ==
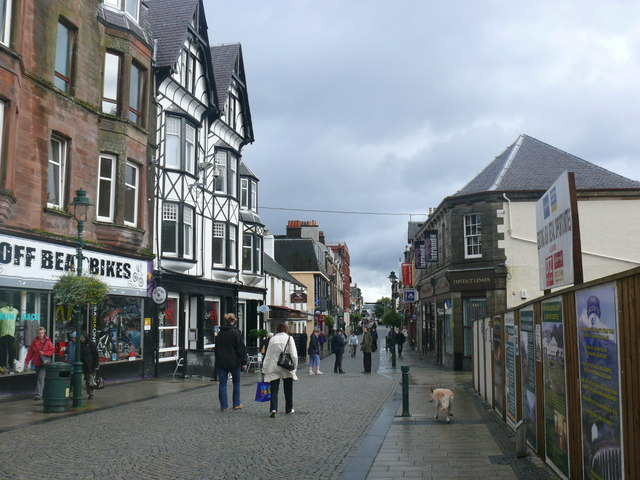
Fort William, Scotland

Kennedy was born on 25 November 1959 in the Scottish Highlands town of Inverness, the son of Mary and Ian Kennedy, and grew up in a remote crofter's cottage in the Highlands. He had a Catholic upbringing, and was educated at Lochaber High School in Fort William. He went on to study for a Master of Arts degree in Politics and Philosophy at Glasgow University. Kennedy first became politically active at university, where he joined the SDP as well as the Dialectic Society, in which he led the Social Democratic faction in debates and took the jocular "constituency" of Lochaber. Between 1980 and 1981, Kennedy was President of the Glasgow University Union. He won the Observer Mace debating competition in 1982, speaking with Clark McGinn.

Upon graduation in 1982, Kennedy went to work for BBC Scotland as a journalist. He later received a Fulbright Fellowship which allowed him to carry out research at Indiana University in the United States.

== Early political career ==
At the age of 15 he joined the Labour Party, followed in 1981 by the newly formed Social Democratic Party (SDP). Two years later, Kennedy received the SDP nomination to stand for the Scottish seat of Ross, Cromarty and Skye—then held by Conservative Hamish Gray—at the 1983 general election. Kennedy won the seat with 13,528 votes (38.5%) and a majority of 1,704. He was, at the age of 23, the youngest sitting Member of Parliament at the time he was elected to the House of Commons. He served on the Social Services select committee from 1985 to 1987, retained his seat at the 1987 general election, and served on the Televising of Proceedings of the House select committee from 1987 to 1989.

He was the first of the five SDP MPs to support its merger with the Liberal Party (with which the SDP was co-operating in the SDP–Liberal Alliance) because of pressure from Liberal activists in his constituency. The parties merged in 1988, forming the Social and Liberal Democratic Party, later renamed the Liberal Democrats.

Kennedy moved into frontbench politics in 1989, becoming the Liberal Democrats' spokesperson for health. After retaining his seat in the 1992 general election he served as the party's spokesperson for foreign and Commonwealth affairs during the 1992–97 parliament. He retained his seat in the 1997 general election and served on the Standards and Privileges select committee from 1997 to 1999.

He was president of the Liberal Democrats from 1990 to 1994, and Liberal Democrat spokesperson for the office of the Leader of the House of Commons from 1997 to 1999.

== Leader of the Liberal Democrats ==
Kennedy was elected leader of the Liberal Democrats on 9 August 1999, following the retirement of Paddy Ashdown. He won 57% of the transferred vote under the alternative vote system, beating the runner-up Simon Hughes (43% of the transferred vote), Malcolm Bruce, Jackie Ballard and David Rendel. In October of the same year, he was sworn in as a Member of the Privy Council.

Kennedy's style of leadership was regarded as "conversational and companionable". He was labelled "Chatshow Charlie" by some observers as a result of his appearances on the satirical panel show Have I Got News for You. (Note: Kennedy appeared in nine episodes of HIGNFY, with the first episode following his death ending with a tribute to him.)

In Kennedy's first campaign as leader, the 2001 general election, the Liberal Democrats won 52 seats with an 18.3% share of the vote; this was a 1.5% improvement in vote share (and an improvement of six seats) over the 1997 election, but smaller than the 25.4% vote share the SDP/Liberal Alliance had achieved in 1983, which won it 23 seats. Kennedy led his party's opposition to the Iraq War, with all Liberal Democrats voting against or abstaining in the vote for the invasion of Iraq—the largest British party to do so.

=== Health concerns ===
In July 2002, Jeremy Paxman publicly apologised after asking Kennedy about his drinking in a television interview. Reports emerged of Kennedy's ill-health in 2003 at the time of crucial debates on the Iraq War and following the 2004 Budget, along with linked rumours of a drinking problem, which were strenuously denied at the time by both Kennedy and his party. The Times published an apology over a report it had made stating Kennedy had not taken part in that year's Budget debate because of excessive drinking.

In April 2005, the launch of his party's manifesto for the 2005 general election was delayed because of the birth of his first child, with Menzies Campbell taking temporary charge as acting leader and covering Kennedy's campaign duties. At the manifesto launch, on his first day back on the campaign trail following the birth, Kennedy struggled to remember the details of a key policy (replacing the Council Tax with a local income tax) at an early morning press conference, which he later blamed on a lack of sleep due to his new child.

=== 2005 general election ===
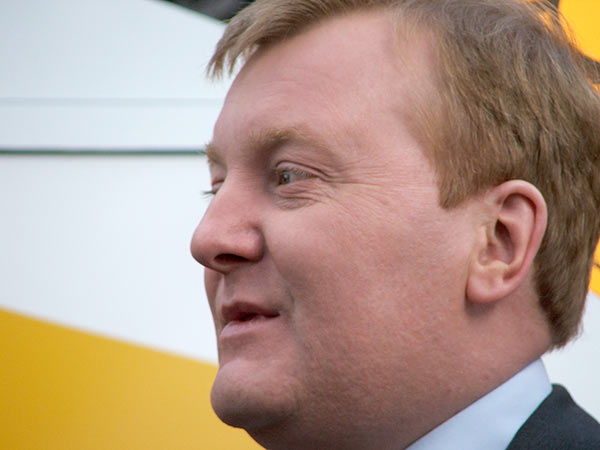
Kennedy during the 2005 election campaign

In his last general election as leader, in May 2005, he extended his strategy from the 2001 election of targeting the seats held by the most senior and/or highly regarded Conservative MPs, dubbed a "decapitation" strategy. The Liberal Democrats also hoped to capture marginal Labour seats, attracting particularly Muslim Labour voters who were dissatisfied with the party over the Iraq War.

Just before the election, it had been anticipated by the media and opinion polls that the Liberal Democrats could win up to 100 seats and place themselves close to the Conservatives in terms of seats as well as votes. They won 62 seats and 22.1% of the vote, at the time their greatest number of seats since their Liberal Party predecessor won 158 seats in 1923.

The Liberal Democrats made a net loss of five seats to the Conservatives, only managing to win three seats from them. While they were able to unseat Shadow Secretary of State for Education Tim Collins, they failed to unseat leading Conservatives such as the Shadow Chancellor of the Exchequer Oliver Letwin, Shadow Home Secretary David Davis, Shadow Secretary of State for the Family (later Prime Minister of the United Kingdom) Theresa May and the Leader of the Opposition Michael Howard. The "decapitation" strategy was widely seen to have failed. They won twelve seats from Labour, but lost Leicester South. They succeeded in regaining Ceredigion from Plaid Cymru.

Kennedy heralded the Liberal Democrats, who now had a total of 62 seats, as the "national party of the future", but in the wake of the general election, Kennedy's leadership came under increased criticism from those who felt that the Liberal Democrats could have surged further forward, with the official opposition Conservative Party having been relatively weak.

=== Leadership concerns ===
Following the election of David Cameron as Leader of the Conservative Party in December 2005, it was widely reported that senior members of the Liberal Democrats had told Kennedy that he must either "raise his game" or resign. Speculation surrounding the leadership of the Liberal Democrats was widespread in late 2005, with the journalist Andrew Neil claiming to speak "on good authority" that Kennedy would announce his resignation at the 2006 spring conference of the Liberal Democrats. Kennedy's spokeswoman denied the report and complained against the BBC, which had broadcast it.

A "Kennedy Must Go" petition was started by The Liberal magazine (a publication with no affiliation to the Liberal Democrats); this allegedly had been signed by over 3,300 party members including 386 local councillors and two MPs by the end of 2005. A round robin signed by Liberal Democrat MPs rejecting his leadership received 23 signatures.

=== Resignation ===
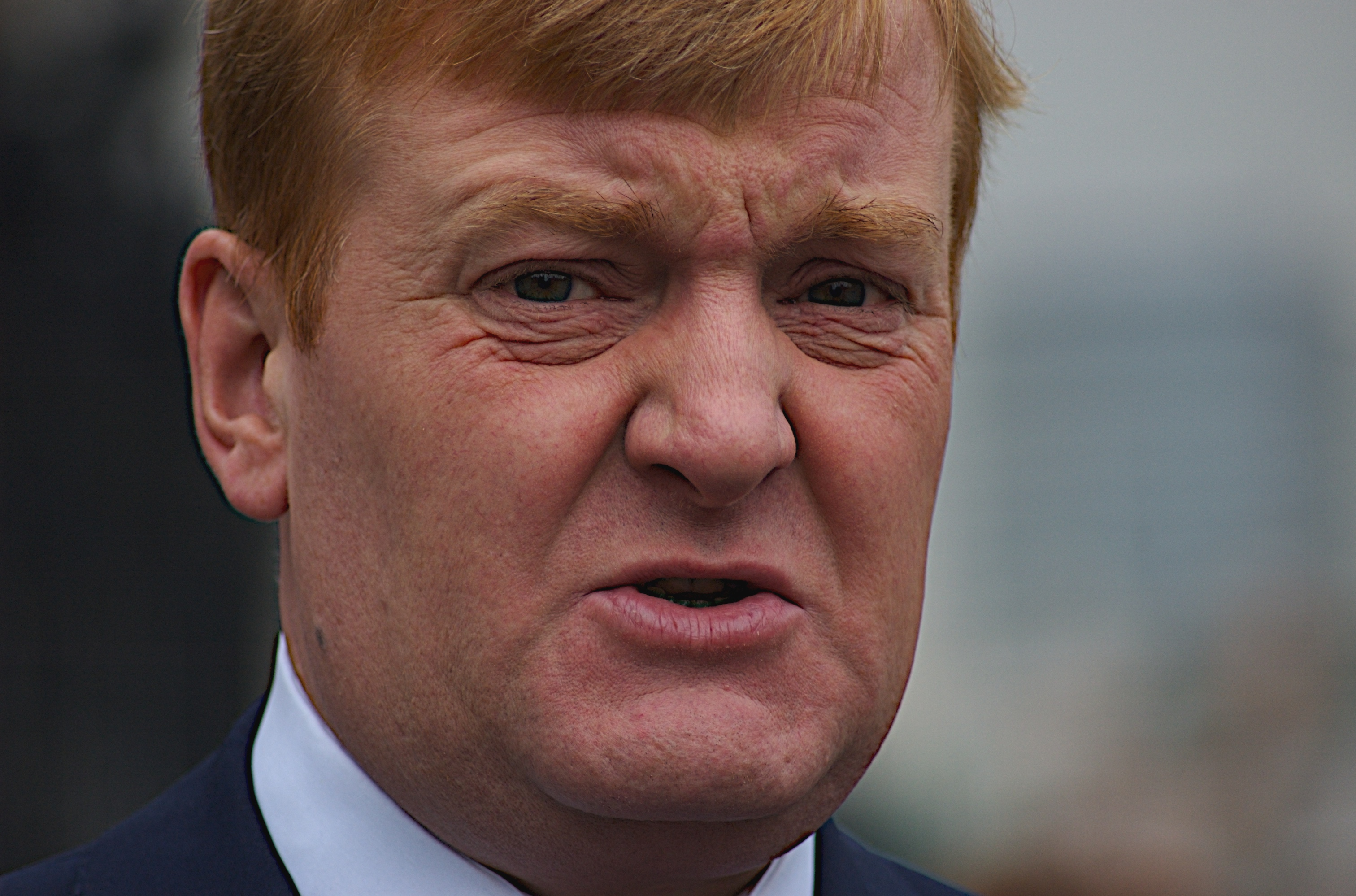
Kennedy in October 2007.

On 5 January 2006, Kennedy was informed that ITN would be reporting that he had received treatment for a drinking problem. He decided to pre-empt the broadcast, called a sudden news conference, and made a personal statement that over the past eighteen months he had been coming to terms with a drinking problem, but had sought professional help. He told reporters that recent questions among his colleagues about his suitability as leader were partly as a result of the drinking problem but stated that he had been dry for the past two months and would be calling a leadership contest, in which he would stand, to resolve the issues surrounding his authority once and for all. It was later claimed that the source for ITN's story was his former press secretary turned ITV News correspondent, Daisy McAndrew.

The admission of a drinking problem seriously damaged his standing, and 25 MPs signed a statement urging him to resign immediately. It was later claimed in a biography of Kennedy by the journalist Greg Hurst that senior Liberal Democrats had known about Kennedy's drinking problem when he was elected as leader in 1999, and had subsequently kept it hidden from the public.

On 7 January 2006, Kennedy called another press conference, at which he announced that while he was buoyed by the supportive messages he had received from grass root members, he felt that he could not continue as leader because of the lack of confidence from the parliamentary party. He said he would not be a candidate in the leadership election and was standing down as leader "with immediate effect", with Menzies Campbell to act as interim leader until a new leader was elected. He also confirmed in his resignation statement that he did not expect to remain on the Liberal Democrat frontbench team. He pledged his loyalty to a new leader as a backbencher, and said he wished to remain active in the party and in politics. Campbell went on to win the resulting leadership election, and Kennedy subsequently gave his successor full public support. His leadership had lasted slightly less than six years and five months.

== Later political career ==
=== Backbencher ===
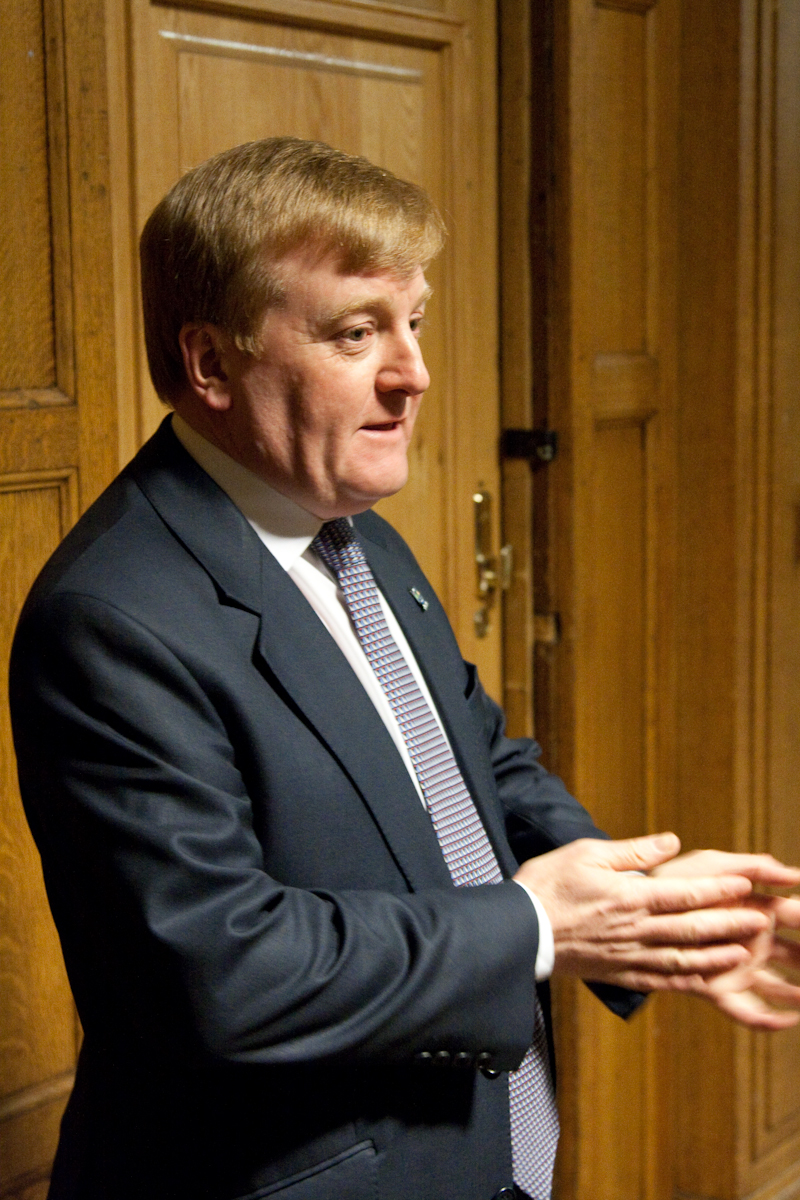
Charles Kennedy attending a debate at the Glasgow University Union on 10 February 2009

After resigning as party leader, Kennedy remained in office as a backbench MP. His first major political activity was to campaign in the 2006 Dunfermline and West Fife by-election, which the Liberal Democrats went on to win, taking the seat from Labour.

On 22 June 2006, Kennedy made his first appearance in the national media after stepping down as party leader when he appeared on the BBC's Question Time. One of the questions on the show was about his possible return as leader, which he declined to rule out.

On 4 August 2006, he hosted a documentary on Channel 4 about what he saw as the increasing disenchantment felt by voters towards the main parties in British politics because of their hesitation to discuss the big issues, especially at election time, and the ruthless targeting of swing-voters in key constituencies at the expense of the majority. He also contributed an article covering the same issues to The Guardian's Comment Is Free section.

After Campbell resigned as Liberal Democrat leader on 15 October 2007, Kennedy said that it was "highly unlikely" that he would try to return as party leader, but he did not rule it out completely.

=== Conservative–Liberal Democrat coalition (2010–2015) ===
At the 2010 general election, Kennedy was re-elected to parliament with a majority of 13,070.

Kennedy voted against the Conservative–Liberal Democrat coalition in May 2010, explaining in an article for The Observer that he "did not subscribe to the view that remaining in opposition ourselves, while extending responsible 'confidence and supply' requirements to a minority Conservative administration, was tantamount to a 'do nothing' response". Finally, Kennedy warned of the risks of "a subsequent assimilation within the Conservative fold", adding: "David Cameron has been here often before: from the early days of his leadership he was happy to describe himself as a 'liberal Conservative'. And we know he dislikes the term Tory. These ongoing efforts at appropriation are going to have to be watched".

The media reported on 21 August 2010 that Kennedy was about to defect from the Liberal Democrats to Labour in protest against his party's role in the coalition government's public spending cuts, but the Liberal Democrats were swift to deny these reports.

Kennedy played a role in the cross-party Better Together campaign in favour of a "No" vote in the 2014 Scottish independence referendum. In March 2014, The Sunday Post reported that Kennedy had criticised Labour's strategy in the referendum campaign and said that Better Together needed to consider its legacy.

Kennedy lost his seat at the 2015 general election to Ian Blackford of the Scottish National Party, amid a nationwide loss of 49 seats by the Liberal Democrats. He received 14,995 votes and 35.9% of the vote, losing to Blackford by 5,124 votes. The campaign attracted national attention because of its acrimony; Blackford objected to being called a "well-funded banker" and confronted Kennedy in his office. Liberal Democrats accused Blackford of dog whistling about Kennedy's struggles with alcoholism. Leaflets were distributed telling voters "Why bottle it? Make a Change!", but the SNP denied responsibility for their distribution and condemned them. Former Liberal Democrat leader Menzies Campbell labelled the campaign, "far and away the most despicable I encountered in all my years in UK politics." However, Blackford said he was "proud" of the campaign and claimed there was "absolutely no issue" between himself and Kennedy before his death in June 2015.

=== Rector of University of Glasgow ===
In February 2008, Kennedy was elected Rector of the University of Glasgow and was officially installed, succeeding Mordechai Vanunu, on 10 April 2008. He won the election with a 46% share of the vote, supported by not only his own Glasgow University Union but also the Queen Margaret Union and Glasgow University Sports Association. He was re-elected in February 2011, defeating one other candidate, the writer A. L. Kennedy, by a clear margin. He served six years as rector until Edward Snowden was elected in February 2014.

== Personal life ==
In July 2002, Kennedy married Sarah Gurling, the sister of his friend James Gurling. They had a son, who was born in 2005. On 9 August 2010, it was announced that Kennedy and his wife were to separate, and their divorce was granted on 9 December 2010.

Late in life Kennedy began a relationship with Carole Macdonald, a close friend from University and the widow of his long-time friend Murdo Macdonald. Murdo had been godfather to Charles' son Donald, with the two being good friends since their days together on the Glasgow University Union Board in the late 1970s. Macdonald had at times accompanied Kennedy on campaign offering support and acting as an informal adviser. His death from cancer in 2007 hit Kennedy hard, leading to a serious deterioration in his long-term struggle with alcohol from which he never truly recovered. Carole discovered Kennedy's body the night he died.

Kennedy's father Ian, to whom he was close, died in April 2015, just two months before his son's death. He had been a brewery worker but a lifelong teetotaller. Kennedy had chosen a recording of his father's fiddle playing when he appeared on Desert Island Discs in 2003.

== Death ==
Kennedy died on the evening of 1 June 2015 at his home in Fort William, aged 55. His death was announced in the early hours of the following day. The police described his death as "sudden and non-suspicious". Following a post-mortem, his family announced that Kennedy had died of a major haemorrhage linked to his alcoholism.

A funeral Mass was held on 12 June at his parish church, St John's Roman Catholic Church, in Caol near Fort William, and his body was buried at his family's cemetery at Clunes. A service of thanksgiving was held at the University of Glasgow on 18 June and it was announced that the university would be fundraising to name a teaching area in memory of him. A memorial service was held in St George's Cathedral, Southwark, London, on 3 November.

== Electoral history ==
UK general elections
Date of election	Constituency	Party	Votes	% of votes	Result	Ref
1983 general election	Ross, Cromarty and Skye	Social Democratic Party	13,528	38.5	Elected	
1987 general election	Ross, Cromarty and Skye	Social Democratic Party	18,809	49.4	Re-elected	
1992 general election	Ross, Cromarty and Skye	Liberal Democrats	17,066	41.6	Re-elected	
1997 general election	Ross, Skye and Inverness West	Liberal Democrats	15,472	38.7	Re-elected	
2001 general election	Ross, Skye and Inverness West	Liberal Democrats	18,832	54.1	Re-elected	
2005 general election	Ross, Skye and Lochaber	Liberal Democrats	19,100	58.7	Re-elected	
2010 general election	Ross, Skye and Lochaber	Liberal Democrats	18,335	52.6	Re-elected	
2015 general election	Ross, Skye and Lochaber	Liberal Democrats	14,995	35.9	Unseated	

== Bibliography ==
=== Works ===
- The Future of Politics (2000) ISBN 0-00-710131-7 (hardcover) ISBN 0-00-710132-5 (paperback)

=== Biography ===
- Hurst, Greg. Charles Kennedy: A Tragic Flaw. Politico's Publishing Ltd (18 September 2006) ISBN 1-84275-176-X

== See also ==
- List of Liberal Democrat MPs
- List of deaths through alcohol

== Notes ==
Parliament of the United Kingdom
New constituency	Member of Parliament for Ross, Cromarty and Skye; 1983–1997	Constituency abolished
New constituency	Member of Parliament for Ross, Skye and Inverness West; 1997–2005	Constituency abolished
New constituency	Member of Parliament for Ross, Skye and Lochaber; 2005–2015	Succeeded by Ian Blackford
Preceded by Owen Carron	Baby of the House; 1983–1987	Succeeded by Matthew Taylor
Party political offices
Preceded by Ian Wrigglesworth	President of the Liberal Democrats; 1991–1994	Succeeded by Robert Maclennan
Preceded by Paddy Ashdown	Leader of the Liberal Democrats; 1999–2006	Succeeded by Menzies Campbell
Academic offices
Preceded by Mordechai Vanunu	Rector of the University of Glasgow; 2008–2014	Succeeded by Edward Snowden
