= Glasgow University Dialectic Society =

Student debating society in Glasgow City, Scotland

- Formation: Before 1770; claims 1451. Refounded 1861.
- Location: Glasgow
- Members: ~145 (excl. Life Members)
- President: Harry Braid
- Honorary Secretary: Emilia Faulkiner
- Honorary President: Armando Ianucci
Colours
- Parent organization: University of Glasgow
- Affiliations: Glasgow University Union, Students' Representative Council
- Website: Society Website

The Glasgow University Dialectic Society, re-instituted in 1861, is a student society at the University of Glasgow, Scotland, committed to the promotion of debating, logic, ethics and literary discussion at the university. The society is independent and open to all students of the university, but maintains strong links with debating at Glasgow University Union.

== History ==
The date of the society's foundation is contested; the earliest paper records of the society are dated before 1770, and there are, moreover, mentions within the university records of a society existing and being open to students who took Logic, back when the university still resided within Glasgow Cathedral. By 1776 students at the University had formed three societies, "the Eclectic, the Dialectic, and the Academic", of which John Jamieson was a member of all three. Society meetings were held in college classrooms, and attended by visitors and professors. Pope John Paul II issued a 'Papal Letter' to the society upon his visit to Scotland in 1982, which recognised the society's claim to have been established in 1451. The society was formally re-instituted in 1861. The society has led the UK's university debating culture since 1953. In 1955, it won the Observer Mace, now the John Smith Memorial Mace, named after the deceased GUU debater and former leader of the British Labour Party. The Society won the 1983 World University Debating Championships in Princeton with a team headed by John Nicolson and Frank McKiergan. The GUU has since won the Mace debating championship sixteen more times, far more than any other university. The GUU has also won the World Universities Debating Championships five times.

== Activities ==
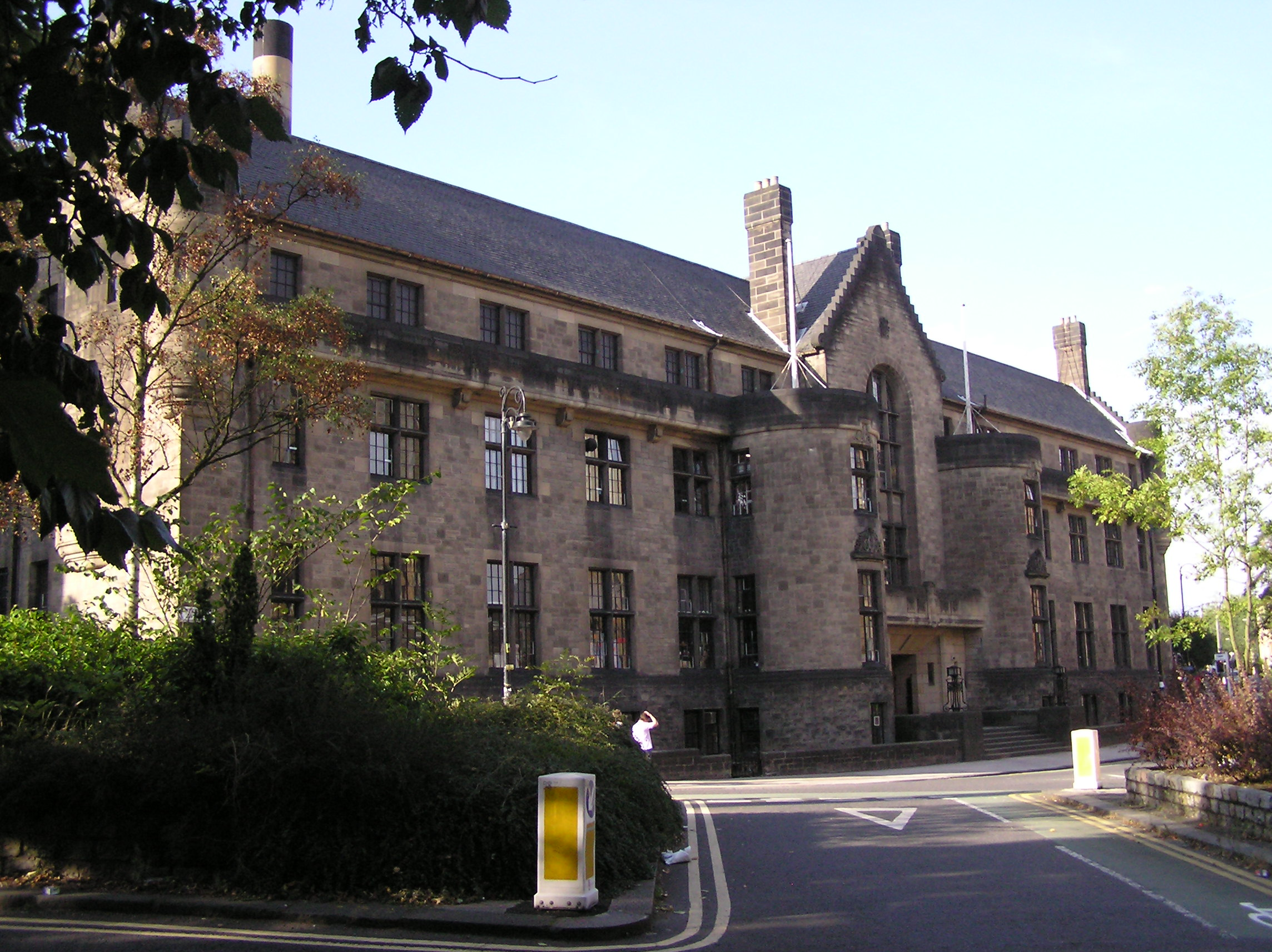
The Glasgow University Union, the principal venue for debating at the University of Glasgow.

The society organises a variety of events during term-time ranging from panel debates and discussions to social mixers and show debates for its members. In November, the society holds a New Members' Dinner, followed in March by the Annual Members' Dinner, held shortly before the AGM. Additionally it holds the Honorary President's Debate and a Sports Day - the Dialectic Olympics - as part of its marquee annual events. The society holds a number of more informal events, especially during Freshers' Week, to attract new members.

Two internal competitions are organised by the society: the Reftable, for new speakers; and the Garry-MacDonald Debate, between incoming and outgoing club leaders of the Glasgow University Union's Parliamentary Clubs.

The Dialectic Society, along with the Glasgow University Medico-Chirurgical Society and Glasgow University Athletic Club, was one of the founding societies of the Glasgow University Union in 1885, as well as being instrumental in establishing the Glasgow University Students' Representative Council the following year, and remains an active contributor to the activities of both organisations.

The archives of Glasgow University Dialectic Society are maintained by the Archives of the University of Glasgow (GUAS).

== Management ==
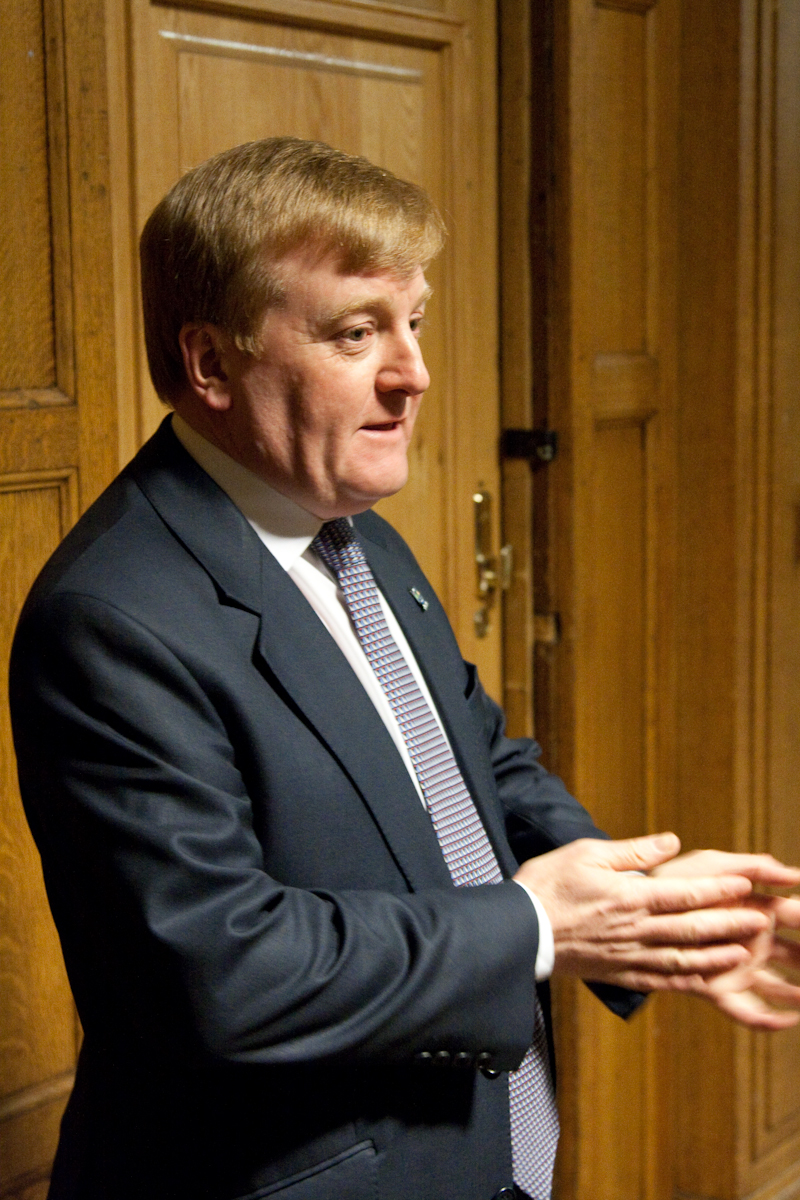
Charles Kennedy at the Honorary President's Debate, February 2009

The management of the society is entrusted to a board elected at the Annual General Meeting (AGM). The Board consists of an Executive of five individuals comprising the President, Vice-President, Honorary Secretary, Honorary Treasurer, and Assistant Honorary Secretary. They are additionally joined on the Board by the Whip Secretary, Publicity Secretary, Macer, Social convenor, Welfare Officer, Charity Officer, Archive Librarian, and up to four Ordinary Board Members, the number of which is determined by the newly elected Executive. Two first-year members are elected to the Board by the end of the first semester of each year. The Convenor of Debates of the Glasgow University Union and the Society's immediate past President are Ex Officio members of the Board.

The electoral procedure at the AGM runs such that posts are filled in descending order, allowing those who failed to win more important posts to stand for others. The AGM was traditionally held at the end of the university's Candlemas Term, around the middle of March. Despite the new semester-based structure of the university's academic year, this remains the case and the AGM is now held shortly before the end of the teaching period of the second semester, which is separated from the exam period by the Easter vacation.

At the AGM the Society elects an Honorary President, alongside up to eight Honorary Vice-Presidents and Honorary Life Members. Those elected are often respected public figures and persons who have done some service to the Society, although less serious joke candidates often also make it onto the ballot. From time to time these elections have generated some public controversy, most notably with the previous choices of Bobby Sands and Leopoldo Galtieri. The current Honorary President is Armando Iannucci.

One of the honorary president's duties is to chair the Honorary President's Debate, held in February each year. If not chaired by the Honorary President, then the next highest ranking member of the Board (usually the President) will chair the debate.

== Former members ==
Notable former members of the society include:

- Sir Menzies Campbell — former leader of the Liberal Democrats
- Donald Dewar — former First Minister of Scotland
- Liam Fox — Secretary of State for International Trade
- Brian Gill, Lord Gill — Lord Justice Clerk
- Derry Irvine, Lord Irvine — former Lord Chancellor
- Charles Kennedy — former leader of the Liberal Democrats, former Rector of the University
- Andrew Neil — journalist and broadcaster
- Meta Ramsay — former Secret Intelligence Service officer
- John Smith — former leader of the Labour Party, President 1960-1961
- Paul Sweeney — Labour & Co-operative MSP for Glasgow Region
- Cosmo Gordon Lang, Baron Lang — former Archbishop of Canterbury

== Groundings ==
Groundings
- Discipline: Humanities, arts, social sciences
- Language: English

Publication details
- History: 2007–present
- Publisher: Glasgow University Union (United Kingdom)
- Frequency: Annually
- Open access: Yes
- License: CC-BY 4.0

Standard abbreviations
- ISO 4: Groundings

Indexing
- ISSN: 1754-7474 (print); 1755-2702 (web)

Links
- Journal homepage; Current Issue

The society was responsible for the founding of Groundings, an interdisciplinary journal publishing work in the humanities, arts, and social sciences.

Groundings was established by the society in 2007 and has since been published annually. The purpose of the journal is to provide an opportunity for undergraduate students at the university to have their work peer-reviewed and published in an accessible academic resource as a stepping stone to publication in more mainstream scholarly journals. As such, all entries are written by undergraduate students, and the editorial board is made up of undergraduates, although there exists an advisory panel mainly comprising academics of the university drawn from a range of disciplines.

Following an agreement between the Society and the Glasgow University Union in 2018, control over the management and publication of Groundings was transferred into the remit of the Libraries Committee of the Glasgow University Union, with the archives librarian acting as a representative for the Dialectic Society amongst the editors.

There are generally around ten articles per volume, each written and peer-reviewed by undergraduate students, and each volume of the journal follows a theme, to which it is intended the articles in that volume will relate. The theme for the first volume was "Identity and Commemoration", and for the second volume, "Individuals, institutions, and the relations between them". The themes used are intentionally broad in order to accommodate the largest variety possible between submissions, whilst ensuring each volume retains a sense of inherent direction.

The journal is produced in paper and electronic form, with initial funding for publication provided by the Chancellor's Fund. Print copies are made available to a number of depositories in the United Kingdom, including the Glasgow University Library, and the journal is available to read online.
