= Glasgow University Magazine =

Student magazine of the University of Glasgow

Winter 2009 issue of GUM

The Glasgow University Magazine (GUM) was first published on 5 February 1889, aiming to keep students informed of news and events within the university, and to provide an outlet for student writing and illustrations.

It is the oldest continuously published student magazine in Scotland and despite changes in style has continued to document the university's history from the student's point of view, with reports of sporting achievements and debates, short stories and poems, articles and letters giving opinions on the political and moral issues of the day, and photographs of office bearers and medal winners.

GUM provided a start for a number of illustrators, writers and editors who went on to make their marks in the wider world. They included James Bridie, Charles Oakley, and John Buchan, the author of The Thirty-Nine Steps, who wrote for GUM in the 1890s.

GUM is a part of and is partially funded by Glasgow University Students' Representative Council, although it retains editorial independence. It is one of four student media organisations within the SRC, who provide both a service and opportunities to students at the university and to the local community.

The Magazine won three awards in The Herald Scottish Student Press Awards 2006: Best Production, Best Magazine and Student Journalist of the Year for Jenny Munro's fashion writing.

The Magazine also won the award for Best Magazine at the 2008 Herald Scottish Student Press Awards.
