= University of Glasgow Medico-Chirurgical Society =

- University of Glasgow Medico-Chirurgical Society
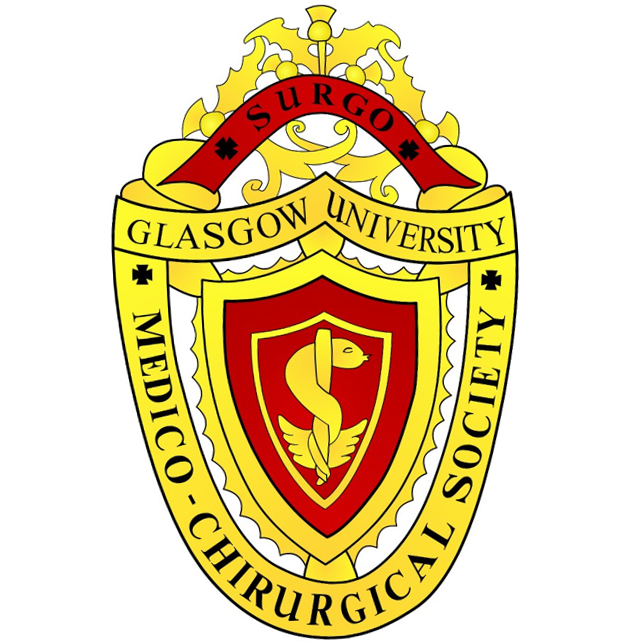
- MedChir Coat of Arms
- Abbreviation: MedChir
- Established: 1802
- Founded at: University of Glasgow
- Location: Glasgow, Scotland
- Members: c. 7,000
- President: Rohaid Riaz
- Vice President: Abigail Thomson
- Secretary: Tegan Edwards
- Treasurer: Nia Edwards
- Publication: Surgo; Editor-in-Chief (Innes Crawford)
- Affiliations: University of Glasgow; Glasgow University Union] University of Glasgow Medical School
- Website: www.medchir.co.uk

The University of Glasgow Medico-Chirurgical Society is a student society at the University of Glasgow which organises social and educational events for medical students at the university. The president for 2026-27 is Abbie Thomson.

== History ==
Founded in 1802, Med-Chir is one of the oldest medical societies in Scotland The society was formed twelve years before practising physicians and surgeons in Glasgow began to meet for formal instruction.

It is one of the oldest societies in the university and was instrumental in founding the Glasgow University Union in 1890, along with the Glasgow University Dialectic Society, Comunn Oiseanach Oilthigh Ghlaschu, and Glasgow University Athletic Club. It retains close ties with the Glasgow University Union. In 1936, the society arranged an excursion to Hamburg, Berlin and London.

== Activities ==
The University of Glasgow Medico-Chirurgical Society, AKA MedChir, is one of Glasgow University’s longest running societies. MedChir are responsible for organising social nights, educational events and sports for Glasgow University Medical Students, with the highlights being the Annual Medical School Ball, the Revue (all-medic talent competition, won by Emeli Sandé during her time at Glasgow Medical School).

Additionally, 'Surgo' has been MedChir’s in-house publication since 1935 and it provides a look at medic life.

MedChir has its own medics Football, Rugby, Netball, Badminton, Squash, Basketball, Ultimate Frisbee and Hockey clubs.

== Former members ==
Many illustrious former members maintain a link with the society and the MedChir Life Members Tie has been spotted on more than a few occasions, notably when Sam Galbraith presented the Scottish Cup. During the 2011-12 session the MedChir Life Members Badge was introduced.

== Archives ==
The archives for the University of Glasgow Medico-Chirurgical Society are maintained by the Archives of the University of Glasgow (GUAS).
