= Duncan Hamilton (politician) =

Scottish lawyer and politician (born 1973)

Duncan Hamilton KC

Member of the Scottish Parliament for Highlands and Islands (1 of 7 Regional MSPs)
- In office 6 May 1999 – 31 March 2003

Personal details
- Born: 1973 (age 52–53) Irvine, Scotland
- Party: Scottish National Party
- Profession: Lawyer

Duncan Hamilton KC (born 1973 in Troon) is a Scottish lawyer and Scottish National Party politician. He was a Member of the Scottish Parliament (MSP) for the Highlands and Islands region from 1999 to 2003.

He previously wrote a column for The Scotsman newspaper.

== Education ==
Hamilton attended the University of Glasgow, obtaining a first class MA in modern History, before going on to the University of Edinburgh, where he received an LL.B. He also attended the John F. Kennedy School of Government at Harvard University.

In 1994, he and Manus Blessing won the World Universities Debating Championship.

== Career ==
He worked briefly for Procter & Gamble before becoming Assistant to SNP Leader, Alex Salmond and then to the SNP Chief Executive, Michael Russell.

In the 1999 election he stood as a constituency candidate in Argyll and Bute, where he finished second and in Highlands and Islands where he was elected.

Upon his election in 1999 he was, at the age of 25 years old, the youngest Member of the Scottish Parliament. In Holyrood he was the SNP Deputy Party Spokesperson on Enterprise (27 June 2001 – 30 May 2003), then Deputy Party Spokesperson on Lifelong Learning (27 June 2001 – 30 May 2003).

In February 2002, he wrote an open letter to his Argyll and Bute constituency party explaining his decided not to stand for election in 2003 in which he said he believed it was best for elected representatives to have "real life experience" outside politics. He had been tipped to be one of the rising stars of the Scottish Parliament and was regarded as one of the SNP's most able politicians.

He has since pursued a career in law, having been admitted to the Faculty of Advocates in 2006. He has criticised the quality of the legislation passed by the Scottish Parliament.

In 2007 Hamilton was appointed as a political advisor to First Minister Alex Salmond.

On 8 September 2021, it was announced that Hamilton was one of twelve Scottish lawyers to be nominated for appointment as a Queen's Counsel in Scotland.

In 2022 Hamilton became a Part-time Sheriff
