= Glasgow University Union =

Students' union in Glasgow, Scotland

Coordinates: 55.8724°N 4.2850°W

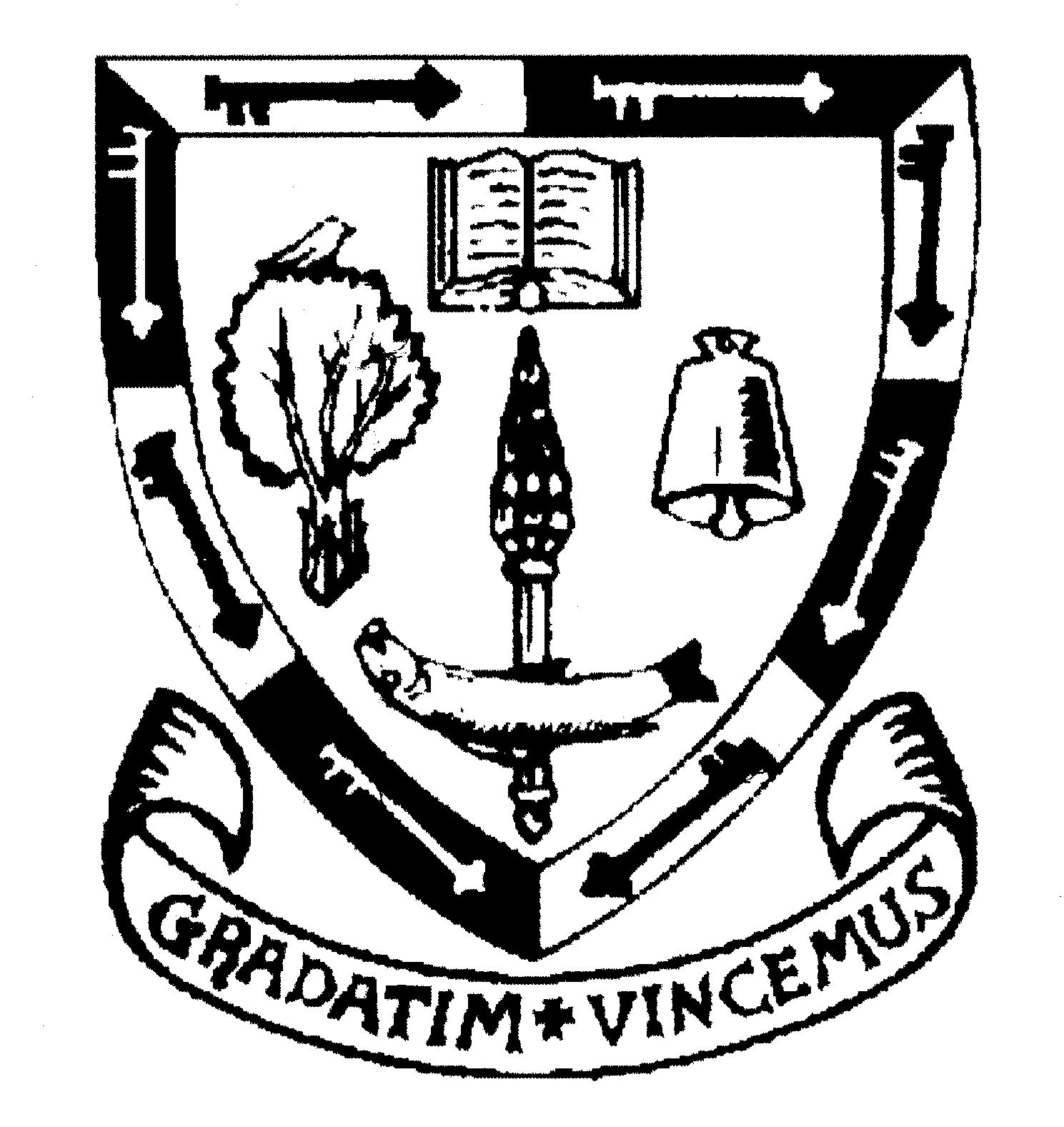
- Motto: Gradatim Vincemus – Latin: (We will conquer by degrees)
- Institution: University of Glasgow
- Location: Glasgow, Scotland, UK
- Established: 1885
- President: Cameron MacKenzie
- Honorary secretary: Anna Dunn
- Members: c. 20,400 (15,000 Life Members)
- Affiliations: Glasgow University Dialectic Society; University of Glasgow Medico-Chirurgical Society; Glasgow University Sports Association
- Website: www.guu.co.uk

Glasgow University Union (GUU) is one of the largest and oldest students' unions in the UK, serving students and alumni of the University of Glasgow since 1885.

The GUU organises social affairs for its members, provides catering and entertainment. Students are eligible to become members for free at any point throughout their university career and alumni may become Life Members by applying to the Board of Management.

== History ==
=== Foundation ===
Students at the university instituted the idea of a union building in 1885 to help promote social interaction on campus. The union's formation was driven by members of Glasgow University Dialectic Society, the Glasgow University Medico-Chirurgical Society and the Glasgow University Athletic Club. The same group formed a Students’ Representative Council in 1886 to raise funds for the building and procured the sum of £5000 from John McIntyre of Odiham, Hampshire.

The Glasgow University Students' Representative Council obtained statutory recognition under the Universities (Scotland) Act 1889 and in 1890 they managed to raise sufficient funds to build the union.

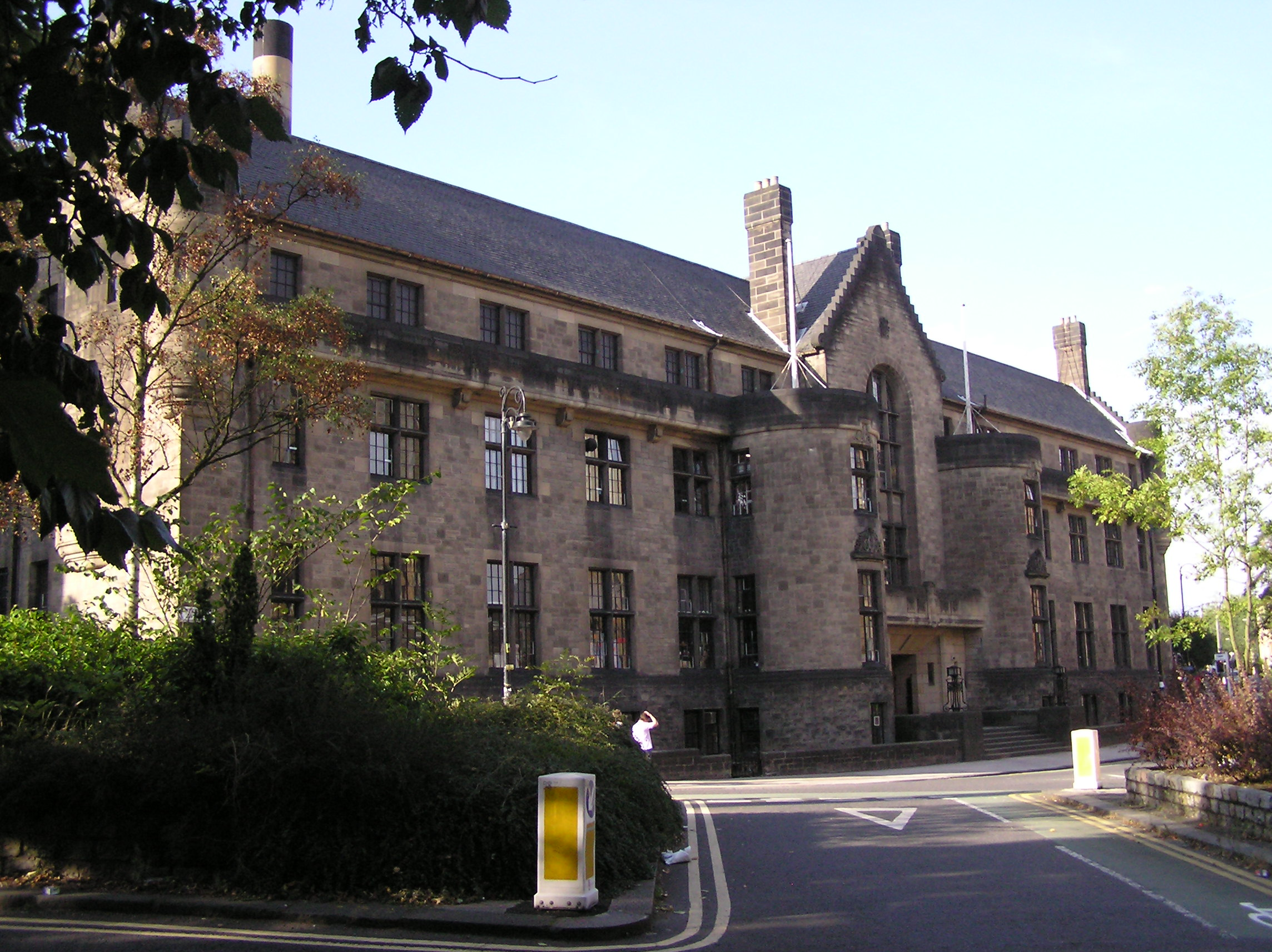
The Glasgow University Union's building at No. 32 University Avenue has been home to the GUU since 1931.

The union was originally accommodated in the John McIntyre Building, named for a major benefactor, which opened in 1890 and was designed by John James Burnet. These premises soon proved to be inadequate however, and a new building at the foot of University Avenue was designed by the architect and former assistant to J.J. Burnet, Alan McNaughton of Arthur & McNaughton in the Scots Baronial style. The new Union building was financed from funds raised by donations to the Student Welfare Scheme, started in 1921 to re-invigorate student life and was erected between 1929 and 1931, with the women of the Queen Margaret Union (QMU) moving into the John McIntyre Building in 1932. The John MacIntyre has been the location of the Glasgow University Students' Representative Council, since the new QMU building opened in 1969. An extension to the Glasgow University Union building was designed by Keppie, Henderson & Partners and opened in 1965, which housed four bars: Deep Six, the Gallery Bar, Altitude and Playing Fields - and the union's nightclub, The Hive. The extension was closed in late January 2013, with demolition of the building following in July of that year. Construction of a new 4,191-square-metre (45,110 sq ft), £13.4 million sports and social facility designed by Page/Park Architects and ECD Architects began in June 2014. This is a shared premises with Glasgow University Sports Association. The GUU element of the building includes a revitalised Hive nightclub and three bars: The Well, Base and G12. The new facility was completed in September 2015 and formally launched on 17 October 2015.

=== Two-union structure ===
The GUU is one of two unions at the University of Glasgow, the other being the Queen Margaret Union, which was established in 1890, after the first matriculation of women at the university in the wake of its merger with Queen Margaret College.

The reason for this separation is that the GUU originally only permitted men to join, while the QMU only admitted women; in fact, the GUU was the last student union in the UK to have single-sex membership. In 1977, in the wake of the Sex Discrimination Act 1975, there was a referendum to mix the two unions, but this was defeated by a large majority. A mixing campaign got seriously under way in 1979, at one point the strictly all-male "Beer Bar" being occupied by a large mixed group of students. An extraordinary general meeting of the QMU voted overwhelmingly to admit men into membership, a move which subverted the whole structure of separate unions. Eventually, in 1980, a GUU special general meeting voted overwhelmingly to admit women into membership, under threat from the University Court of losing the lease on the extension to its building, with just 139 votes against.

== Services ==
=== Board of Management ===
Unlike most student unions, the GUU has no sabbatical officers. Instead, the Union's affairs are controlled on behalf of the membership by a 26-member board of management, featuring 17 elected student positions, seven alumni positions and two ex-officio seats for the President of the Glasgow University Sports Association and the Past President.

The three-person executive committee is made up of the President, Honorary Secretary and Assistant Honorary Secretary. The President chairs the board and is responsible for special projects, external communications and external relations. The Honorary Secretary is responsible for day-to-day operations, membership experience and security & licensing matters, as well as organising flagship events such as Freshers' Week and Daft Friday. This is supported by the Assistant Honorary Secretary, who is also responsible for managing the board and supporting them in operating the Union, whilst also handling the Union's relationships with affiliated clubs and societies.

The Executive liaise with the building management daily to organise operations, and are supported by two alumni Vice Presidents (each elected for two-year terms with one up for re-election each year) and the Honorary Treasurer, who provide strategic guidance. Four conveners operate below this, managing their own committees of Debates, Games, Libraries and Entertainments, made up of Union members, which organise regular events during term-time. Ten Present Student Members are elected, five per year on a two-year term, to represent the members and partake in operational committees ranging from PR to Student Welfare and Sustainability. Four Former Student Members provide a voice for the Union's alumni members as well as experience and support for the student members.

=== Activities ===
The GUU is a social hub for the university, providing the largest billiard hall in the West End, bars, live entertainment and a nightclub. It is one of the largest licensed premises in Scotland with nine bars (and a tenth which is portable for use during functions). In addition, members can eat in the Union Kitchen, relax in the Drawing Room Coffee Shop (formerly the Smoking Room) and take advantage of two libraries provided for study.

The two libraries and the Reading Room, available for study and social events, are maintained by the Libraries Convener. The Elliot Library is named after former inter-war Cabinet Minister Walter Elliot; the Bridie Library after Osborne Mavor, physician, dramatist and founder of the Citizens Theatre, who wrote under the pseudonym, "James Bridie". A mural by Fyffe Christie hangs in the room, illustrating the West End Perk, a poem by Bridie. The Reading Room is dedicated to Donald Dewar, former President of the Union, Secretary of State for Scotland and First Minister of Scotland, and a portrait hangs there in his memory.

== Daft Friday ==
After its impromptu initiation as a piano Sing-along and Smoking concert by the then Honorary Secretary Osborne Henry Mavor on the last day of the 1908 Martinmas Academic term, the highlight of the Union's social calendar is the annual 'Daft Friday' black tie ball which continues to be held at the end of the Martinmas term exam diet. Over the years the event has become increasingly elaborate with the entire union building decorated to a theme and devoted to the festivities.

Over 2000 students attend the event, which includes revolves around a secret theme and hosts entertainments such as a swing band, string quartet, DJs, ceilidhs and laserquest. Bands that have played Daft Friday in recent years, include: Arcade Fire in 2008, Jack Penate in 2009, Bombay Bicycle Club in 2010, Frightened Rabbit in 2011, Basshunter in 2012, Chvrches in 2013, Sub Focus in 2015, Gabrielle Aplin in 2016, Fickle Friends in 2017 and the Hoosiers in 2018.

The evening also includes the James Bridie Memorial dinner; a seven–course meal for around 150 guests. Speakers at the 2011 dinner included Charles Kennedy and David Ross, both of whom are former presidents of the union.

== Debating ==
The GUU is one of the most successful university debating institutions in the world, winning the World Universities Debating Championship five times, the European Universities Debating Championships once and the John Smith Memorial Mace a record 16 times.

The Convener of Debates on the GUU Board is elected from the Union membership and heads the Union Debates Committee. The Convener is responsible for the internal and intervarsity debating activities of the GUU. The Union's Debates Chamber spans the first and second floors of the building.

The Union historically held the biennial John Smith Memorial Debate in memory of the former Leader of the Labour Party and former member of the union and Convener of Debates. The last of these was held in 2011, when guest speakers included Shadow Scottish Secretary Ann McKechin and former Conservative Health Minister Gerry Malone, and which was chaired by then Rector of the University and former leader of the Liberal Democrats Charles Kennedy. A bust of John Smith by Eduardo Paolozzi stands at the entrance to the Debates Chamber gallery.

The Union holds a biennial Charles Kennedy Memorial Debate, the first having been held in 2015. In attendance at the inaugural memorial debate were: Alex Cole-Hamilton, subsequent Liberal Democrat MSP for Edinburgh Western; Alistair Darling, former Chancellor of the Exchequer and Labour MP for Edinburgh South West; Fiona Hyslop, SNP MSP for Linlithgow and Cabinet Secretary for Culture, Tourism and External Affairs; Ian Duncan, Conservative MEP; Graham Stringer, Labour MP for Blackley and Broughton; and Alastair Campbell, former Director of Communications and Strategy at Number 10. The debate was chaired by Former President of the Union and former leader of the Liberal Democrats and MP for North East Fife Sir Menzies Campbell.

=== World Debating Anniversary ===
To mark the 30th anniversary of the World Universities Debating Championships, which were founded by GUU, it held a Grand Show Debate on the subject of Scottish independence. This was held in the union on 19 November 2011.

The debate featured eight of the union's ten former world champions and was chaired by the union president, Chris Sibbald. Speakers in the debate included: former ITN presenter John Nicolson, Managing Director of McKinsey & Company UK and Ireland Kevin Sneader, Royal Bank of Scotland Global Head of Equities Frank McKirgan, Gillette Chief Marketing Officer and Vice President of Procter & Gamble Austin Lally, now President of Braun and a member of the P&G Global Leadership Council, advocate Manus Blessing, Managing Director of Bain Capital Robin Marshall, former MSP, Duncan Hamilton, and entrepreneur Gordon Peterson.

Over two hundred of the union's distinguished alumni turned out for the event, including: former leader of the Liberal Democrats Charles Kennedy; former Conservative Minister of Health Gerald Malone; Channel Four Business Correspondent Sarah Smith; Labour peers Lord James Gordon and Baroness Smith, wife of former Leader of the Opposition and friend of the union, John Smith; Lord Justice Clerk Lord Gill; football commentator Archie Macpherson and comedian Len Murray.

The debate motion of "This House believes in an Independent Scotland", a controversial issue in British politics, was won by the 1987 World Champion team of Kevin Sneader and Austin Lally. They won a Worlds tournament in UCD in 1987 of 110 teams. The Best Speaker prize was awarded to Duncan Hamilton.

The debate garnered national press attention and was filmed live and broadcast internationally by STV. STV's political editor Bernard Ponsonby covered the event.

=== Inter-Varsity Debating ===
The GUU has an established record of international debating success and prominence. It hosted the first World Universities Debating Championship in its current form in 1981 and again in 1990 and 2001. The Union won the Championship five times, in 1983, 1987, 1992, 1994 and 1997. In addition, the GUU has a distinguished history in the John Smith Memorial Mace, a competition between the winners of regional competitions in Ireland, England, Scotland and, latterly, Wales. It holds the record for the most overall wins with a total of sixteen.

In more recent years, the GUU has regularly reached the advanced stages of both the World and European Universities Debating Championships, in addition to winning several domestic UK competitions. The Union most recently made the World Universities Debating Championships Finals in Chennai 2014 and, with a team of Bethany Garry and Owen Mooney, won the European Universities Debating Championship for the first time in August 2017.

=== Parliamentary Debating ===
The Union is notable for its five annual Parliamentary Debates. This format is unique to the Union, involving an Afternoon Session and an Evening Session of five rounds each. GUU Parliamentaries are not to be confused with the British Parliamentary style of debating. Parliamentary debates currently involve five (fictitious) clubs: the Scottish Nationalist Association, Her Majesty's Loyal Tory Club, the Whigs Club, the Independent Socialists and The World Almighty Distributist League. During Parliamentary debates, speakers are referred to by Parliamentary names, assigned to them akin to "constituencies", but usually of a humorous nature.

Some members join clubs to which they are politically aligned; others join clubs for social reasons or for competitive reasons, hoping to be selected by that club's leader to deliver speeches during desirable rounds of the debate. In each year, the clubs rotate roles, as the "Government", "Opposition", Strong Support, Strong Opposition, and Weak Support/Opposition. The Government presents a Bill containing a preamble and three clauses, which is then argued over the course of about nine hours of debate, concluded by the "Prime Minister" who typically gives a speech of between thirty and sixty minutes to sum up the debate.

The debate is judged by the Clerks Bench, consisting of the Clerk to the House, the Deputy Clerk, and three Assistant Clerks. The scores are revealed during the last (and longest) debate. In addition to the Club Championship, individual prizes are awarded to the Best Speaker, Most Promising Speaker, Best Maiden Speaker. There are two additional prizes, the Frederick Richters Cup for best performing speaker for whom English is their Second Language and the John Morrison "Hobbit" Prize for outstanding contributions to the GUU debating community.

Each Parliamentary Debate has a theme and the order is usually as follows: The President's Debate (dedicated to the President of the Union), The Secretary's Debate (dedicated to the Board of Management of the GUU), The Dialectic Debate (dedicated to the Dialectic Society), The Old Hacks' debate (where graduates and former members of the House return for a dedicated additional round) and the Guests' Debate (where members of other debating institutions are invited to participate in the "Guest Round").

The Club Leaders for 2026–2027 are:

- Scottish Nationalist Association – Emilia Faulkiner
- His Majesty's Loyal Tory Club – Jamie Ghosh
- The Whig Club – Harry Braid
- Independent Socialists – Zoe McFadyen
- The World Almighty Distributist League – Amber Okelo

=== Dialectic Society ===
The Glasgow University Dialectic Society was the original debating society for students at the university, thought to have originated from some time around the university's foundation in 1451 but re-instituted in 1861. The Dialectic Society was one of the organisations which contributed to the establishment of the union in 1885 and continues to be involved in the debating activities of the union, whilst retaining an independent status. The GUU Convenor of Debates is an ex officio member of the Board of the Dialectic Society, and the third Parliamentary of the year is dedicated the Dialectic Parliamentary.

== Entertainment ==
The union offers regular entertainments and competitions for members and non-members. Open Mic runs on a Friday evening from 9pm in the Beer Bar along with a number of occasional events such as comedy nights, Battle of the Bands style competitions and concerts. The entertainments committee is also charged with coordinating the Daft Friday ball at the end of the first semester. The Union currently runs two weekly club nights - HIVE Thursdays and Sports Wednesdays.

== Games ==
The Games Convener was originally charged with ensuring that the tables in the union's Billiard room were kept to a good standard. The Games Committee now runs free weekly events as well as the annual 'Month of Games'.

Weekly events include the Beer Bar Quiz (Mondays at 8pm), Snooker Competition (Wednesdays), and annual events comprise snooker and darts competitions, a dodgeball tournament, drinking and Iron Stomach competitions and B.A.D.G.E. (Big All Day Games Event).

== Closure of The Hive ==
In the autumn of 2011, it emerged that the university was considering proposals to demolish the union's extension building and replace it with increased sports facilities. The union's extension building housed five of the union's bars and its nightclub, The Hive. The reaction to these proposals was met with anger among the student population, particularly as loss of the union's nightclub, would result in the closure of the union.

As a result, the union Board of Management campaigned and lobbied the university senior management group, which resulted in national press attention. Many of the union's alumni reacted to the news of this decision with Duncan Hamilton saying: "This is a total failure to appreciate that for many alumni the GUU was the most influential and important part of their university life."

As a result, the university abandoned its original proposals; rather, opting for a joint-venture for union and sports facilities. University of Glasgow principal Professor Anton Muscatelli issued a statement saying: "The University will only commit the Sports Extension when we are also able to commit to a development of GUU social space that will sustain its activities." This was ultimately achieved, with construction of a new extension building starting in June 2014 and completed in September 2015. The Board of Management of 2015−16, along with the Union's General Manager Anne Marie Bennett, formally opened the Hive on 17 October 2015.

== Friends of Glasgow University Union ==
Friends of Glasgow University Union (FoGUU) was formed in 2011 as an independent charity to raise funds for projects at Glasgow University Union. A committee of various life members runs FoGUU and meets on a monthly basis. The committee seeks monthly donations from alumni, with patrons' names being displayed in a Patrons' Board in the union.

FoGUU runs activities for life members, including: reunion dinners, golf days and anniversary events. The charity is an extension of the committee that the union's 125th celebrations in October 2010. This culminated in a dinner for over two hundred alumni, hosted by broadcaster, and former union board member, Andrew Neil.

== Controversy ==
In March 2013, two female debaters visiting the university from Edinburgh and Cambridge for the GUU Ancients Debating Championship complained of incidents of sexist heckling and misogynistic objectification by a number of GUU members. The University's Senate launched disciplinary proceedings against two students, holding a hearing before finding there was "no case to answer". As a result of a separate inquiry launched by the University Union into sexism in its community, conducted by Professor Noreen Burrows, Sandra White MSP and Roddy Neilson, the GUU introduced a new Equality and Diversity policy, Harassment and Bullying policy and Complaints Procedure and made several changes to its Constitution. As part of its response to the culture of sexism identified in the report, the GUU also became the first debating Union in Scotland to introduce diversity quotas, directed towards the increased participation of women in competitions. As a result of these policies, the GUU fielded the team to the European Universities Debating Championships that contained the first woman to win the competition and be named Best Open Speaker.

== Notable members ==
The union counts amongst its former members:

- John Buchan, author and former Governor General of Canada
- Menzies Campbell, former leader of the Liberal Democrats (President)
- Donald Dewar, former First Minister of Scotland (President)
- Walter Elliot, former Cabinet Minister, after whom the Elliot Library is named
- Fred Goodwin, former Chief Executive of the Royal Bank of Scotland
- Hugh Henry, Labour MSP and former Scottish Minister for Education (Assistant Honorary Secretary)
- Robert Stevenson Horne, former Chancellor of the Exchequer
- Gerald Malone, former Conservative Minister of Health
- Archie MacPherson, football commentator
- Angus Grossart, investment banker
- Brian Gill, Lord Gill, Lord Justice Clerk
- John Nicolson, SNP MP and former BBC and ITV News journalist. World University Debating champion in 1983, representing Glasgow.
- Duncan Hamilton, Advocate and former MSP
- Derry Irvine, former Lord Chancellor
- Charles Kennedy, former leader of the Liberal Democrats and Rector of the University (President)
- John MacCormick, one of the founders of the Scottish National Party, former Rector of the University
- Dickson Mabon, former Scottish Office Minister and Labour MP for Greenock (President)
- Andrew Neil, journalist and broadcaster
- Gordon Prentice, Labour MP (President)
- John Smith, former Leader of the Labour Party (Convener of Debates)
- Sarah Smith Scotland Editor for the BBC
- Brian McBride, Chairman of ASOS.com (President)
- David Muir, former CEO of The Channel and pollster and strategist to Rt. Hon Gordon Brown.
- Liam Fox, Conservative MP and former Secretary of State for Defence
- Kirsten Oswald, Former SNP MP for Renfrewshire East.
- Paul Sweeney, Labour & Co-operative MSP for Glasgow Region.
- Joani Reid, Labour MP for East Kilbride & Strathaven

== Archives ==
The archives relating to the Glasgow University Union are maintained in part by the Archives of the University of Glasgow and internally by the Dialectic Society's Archives Librarian.
