= Subcity Radio =

Coordinates: 55.8722°N 4.2888°W

- Scotland

Programming
- Format: Student Radio
- Affiliations: Student Radio Association; University of Glasgow

History
- First air date: 1995

Links
- Webcast: On demand: archived episodes interviews, sessions; Live stream: 24/7 during term time
- Website: subcity.org

Subcity Radio (formerly Sub City and SubCity) is a non-profit freeform radio station, arts collective and events promoter based at the University of Glasgow which is run by volunteers from the university and local community with the aim of providing an alternative to commercial and mainstream radio providers. It currently broadcasts online year round and until September 2009 also on temporary short-term FM restricted service licence broadcasts. The station also hosts a large catalogue of audio for on-demand listening and podcasting, including recordings of the live stream, sessions, interviews, news and live recordings. Off-air, Subcity runs various events and club nights throughout the year, with previous venues including the Sub Club, Art School, Research Club, Stereo, and The Arches.

== Overview ==
Subcity is run by volunteers and has over 200 weekly contributors from all over the city. Contributors include current students and staff of the university, students from other institutions, former students and others from the local community. Many previous contributors have gone on to jobs at commercial and BBC radio stations most notably: Laura Sayers (BBC Radio 1), Dougal Perman (Radio Magnetic), Annie McGuire (BBC Scotland) and Adam Uytman (XFM). In addition to those who have gone on to high-profile careers in radio, many Subcity contributors already had or went on to achieve fame in other areas most notably: Hudson Mohawke, Optimo, Boom Monk Ben, Slam (band) as well as many other Glasgow clubs and DJs.

Subcity has no playlist, instead each show is largely autonomous from station management and presenters have full choice in what music they play as well as the format sound and branding of their shows. The station broadcasts all year round, and from November 2015, the show application process was changed from being a twice yearly window to being open indefinitely. Applicants are invited to submit proposals for a radio show with an outline of what music would be played and what style and format the show would take. Musical specialism, non-mainstream music and under-represented musical styles are encouraged. This contributor autonomy is extended to most areas of the station's output including podcasts, reviews, design, photography, comedy and current affairs output.

It is a part of, and partially funded by, Glasgow University Students' Representative Council. It is one of four student media organisations who receive support from the SRC, who provide both a service and opportunities to students at the university and to the wider community. Subcity is also a former member of the Student Radio Association.

== History ==
Subcity logo 1995-2001 and 2003-2012

Subcity was founded in 1995 after the initial Glasgow University radio brand, Sweet FM, was used by former members of the team who had graduated. They encountered regulatory problems during their broadcast in 1994, leaving the Sweet FM brand tarnished and in dispute with the university student authorities over naming and logo rights. Subsequently, the official university station was rebranded as Subcity Radio.

The university's first broadcast was as Sweet FM in September 1993 for one month on an FM restricted service licence (RSL) from an un-let university flat in the Murano Street Student Village. The next broadcast was under the Ton and a Half brand in conjunction with the Glasgow School of Art who were celebrating their 150th anniversary in the Winter of 1994, with a subsequence joint venture with the School of Art in the winter of 1995 under the "Art School Radio" brand.

=== 1995 ===
- Its first broadcast under the new SubCity brand was in October 1995 from an unused university apartment in Park Circus on a minimal budget. As part of this inaugural broadcast the K Foundation gave their only radio interview about their burning of a million pounds on the SubCity show "Everything You Know Is Wrong" on 3 November 1995 at 6 pm. JD Twitch (of Optimo) was one of the first non student DJs to be invited to contribute and would go on to do a show "Freestyle with Twitch" every year until 2000.

=== 1996 ===
- February saw the station's second broadcast as Subcity Radio .
- The station was later awarded Best Station at the inaugural UK Radio 1 Student Radio Awards.
- In July Subcity ran a 3-week RSL to cover that year's T in the Park festival.

=== 1997 ===
- In March, following the station's awards win the year before, John Peel and Steve Lamacq presented shows from the station's studio, which at the time was in a student's kitchen.
- In July Subcity joined forces with Edinburgh's Fresh Air FM to provide RSLs in Edinburgh, Glasgow and on site for the T in The Park festival.

=== 2001 ===
- The station moved into a purpose built permanent studio on campus in the McIntyre Building where it remains as of 2024.
- In February 2001 Subcity broadcast online for the first time, simultaneously alongside its usual annual month-long FM broadcast.

=== 2002 ===
- In 2002, a five-year low-powered AM licence was awarded. This allowed for year-round broadcasting to campus, rather than for just one month per year. However the AM broadcast was discontinued after 5 months due technical issues.

=== 2003 ===
- The station ceased broadcasting on AM, but continued to streaming online year-round rather than only simulcasting their analogue radio broadcasts.
- In November, the Subcity show 'The City Sessions' won Bronze at the Student Radio Association Student Radio Awards in the Best Specialist Music category.

=== 2004 ===
- In February the station celebrated its tenth birthday with a large event at The Arches in Glasgow. The line up featured DJs from Subcity's past who had gone on to bigger things. 1800 people filled the venue – the largest crowd a student station had ever attracted to an event. It was later discovered that the station's tenth birthday would be in 2005.
- In November, Subcity won the Student Radio Association Student Radio Award for Best Marketing.

=== 2005 ===
- Subcity launch a Listen Again feature, allowing shows to be listened to after their initial broadcast.
- In July the station hosted a small stage on Byres Road at the West End Festival Opening Parade Street Party.
- In November, Subcity show Grind Your Mind won the Student Radio Association Student Radio Award for Best Specialist Music Show, and the Stations won Silver in the Off-Air Promotions and Imaging category.

=== 2007 ===
- In June the station hosted a stage in Lilybank Gardens for the West End Festival Opening Parade Street Party.
- Beginning in November, the station ran a monthly club night during term-time at the university's Hetherington Research Club. This continued until June 2009.

=== 2008 ===
- In Freshers' Week the station launched a new website featuring dynamically updated navigation of its listen again content based on playlist data from every show.
- In November the station won Silver at the Student Radio Association Student Radio Awards in the Best Specialist Music category for drum and bass show Armed Response.
- In June the station again hosted a stage in Lilybank Gardens for the West End Festival Opening Parade Street Party.

=== 2009 ===
- In February Subcity broadcast on 106.6FM across Glasgow for 28 days.
- In June the station again ran a stage at the West End Festival, this time in Kelvingrove Park.
- In September the station broadcast on 106.6FM across Glasgow during Freshers' Week.
- In October, part of Subcity's website was nominated for a Technical Achievement Award at the Student Radio Awards.
- In December, the station launched an archives podcast featuring highlights from sessions, events and the broadcast from the past 15 years.

=== 2010 ===
- On 6 March Subcity celebrated 15 years of broadcasting with a sold out birthday party at The Arches, the first time the station had returned to the venue since the Block Party era ended in 2006.
- On 19 March an episode of the 'Party Party' show on the station was the subject of a news story run initially by the BBC and later in the day by other news outlets including Reporting Scotland. The articles focused on a drinking game feature and the provocative language and nature of the presenters in the episode. The story was the top UK story that day on the BBC News website and made the top 5 total.
- Between April and August, the station moved to temporary premises on South Park Avenue whilst the John McIntyre Building's roof was repaired.
- In September 2010, the station produced a 60-page hand illustrated guide book to Glasgow, called "Subcity's Guide to Staying Fresh 2010". The station also ran an open top bus tour of the city for freshers' of the Art School and University of Glasgow.

=== 2015 ===
- To celebrate its 20th year on air, the station ran a number of events at The Art School including an exhibition featuring print and audio archival content, a party featuring DJs from the station's extensive throughput, and a film screening of a documentary specially made to commemorate the 20th birthday. Some controversy arose from the line up of the 20th birthday party, which initially featured exclusively male DJs.

=== 2017 ===
- In February, DJ and presenter (and ex-station team member) Sofay invited Ben UFO onto the station.
- In May, Subcity Radio held a party at Gourock Outdoor Pool to celebrate the end of the academic year.
