= Queen Margaret Union =

Students' union in Glasgow City, Scotland

Coordinates: 55.874°N 4.291°W

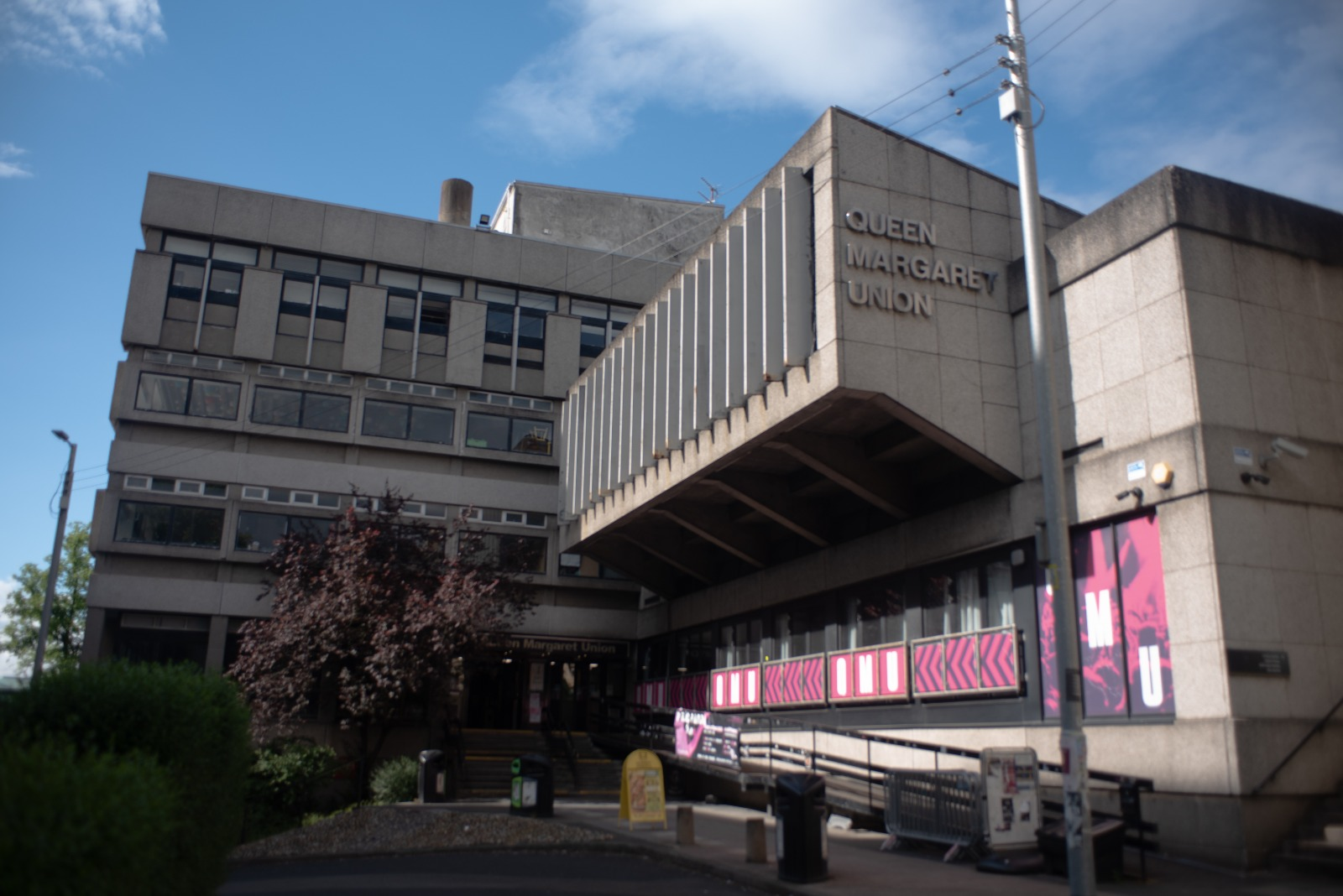
- Exterior of the QMU, 2026
- Institution: University of Glasgow
- Location: 22 University Gardens, Glasgow, Scotland, UK
- Established: 29 March 1890
- President: Urja Singh (2026-2027)
- CEO: Margaret Davidson
- Members: c. 3,000 total
- Website: www.qmunion.org.uk

The Queen Margaret Union (QMU) is one of two students' unions at the University of Glasgow, Scotland. Created as a provider of social activities for the Queen Margaret College, it became a formal organisation in 1890.

The QMU currently caters to the social and cultural needs of students through entertainment, catering, bars, and games, alongside being a gig venue.

== History ==
=== 1890-1979 ===
The Queen Margaret Union was created as the provider of social activities for the social and cultural needs of the Queen Margaret College, which was named after Saint Margaret of Scotland.

The first meeting that led to the formation of the Queen Margaret Students' Union was held on 28 March 1890. Jessie Campbell was elected as honorary president of the union, and all matriculated students of the college were made members of the union. The meeting also decided that the committee of the union would be made up of representatives from the college's classes and two former students.

The union officially formed on 29 March 1890, and held its second meeting on 3 April 1890, which led to Miss Watson being appointed vice president, Miss Cumming as secretary and Miss McMillan as acting president.

Initially, the QMU operated in the basement of the college similarly to a student society. The election of Janette R. B. Nelson as president in 1904 was notable in shifting the role of president from an honorary position to a proper job, being the last president to serve more than one term, and beginning the drive for the QMU to become an independent group from the college.

A bazaar was held by the Board of Management from 7 November until 10 November for "obtaining funds for the erection, equipment and endowment of a Union Building for the Women Students and Graduates of the University of Glasgow". The bazaar was held at St Andrews Halls (now an extension of the Mitchell Library after a fire almost completely destroyed the building in 1962) and the opening ceremony of the event was attended by Princess Louise. The event featured stalls selling a variety of wares from businesses and traders, and entertainment including an underground casino, comedy skits, and a lecture by Ernest H. Shackleton on his Antarctic expedition. By its conclusion, the bazaar had not raised enough money to construct a new building.

A concert in aid of the bazaar was held in October 1906 in Hillhead Burgh Hall. This was "largely attended" and featured a string orchesta and several vocalists including Jessie Soga.

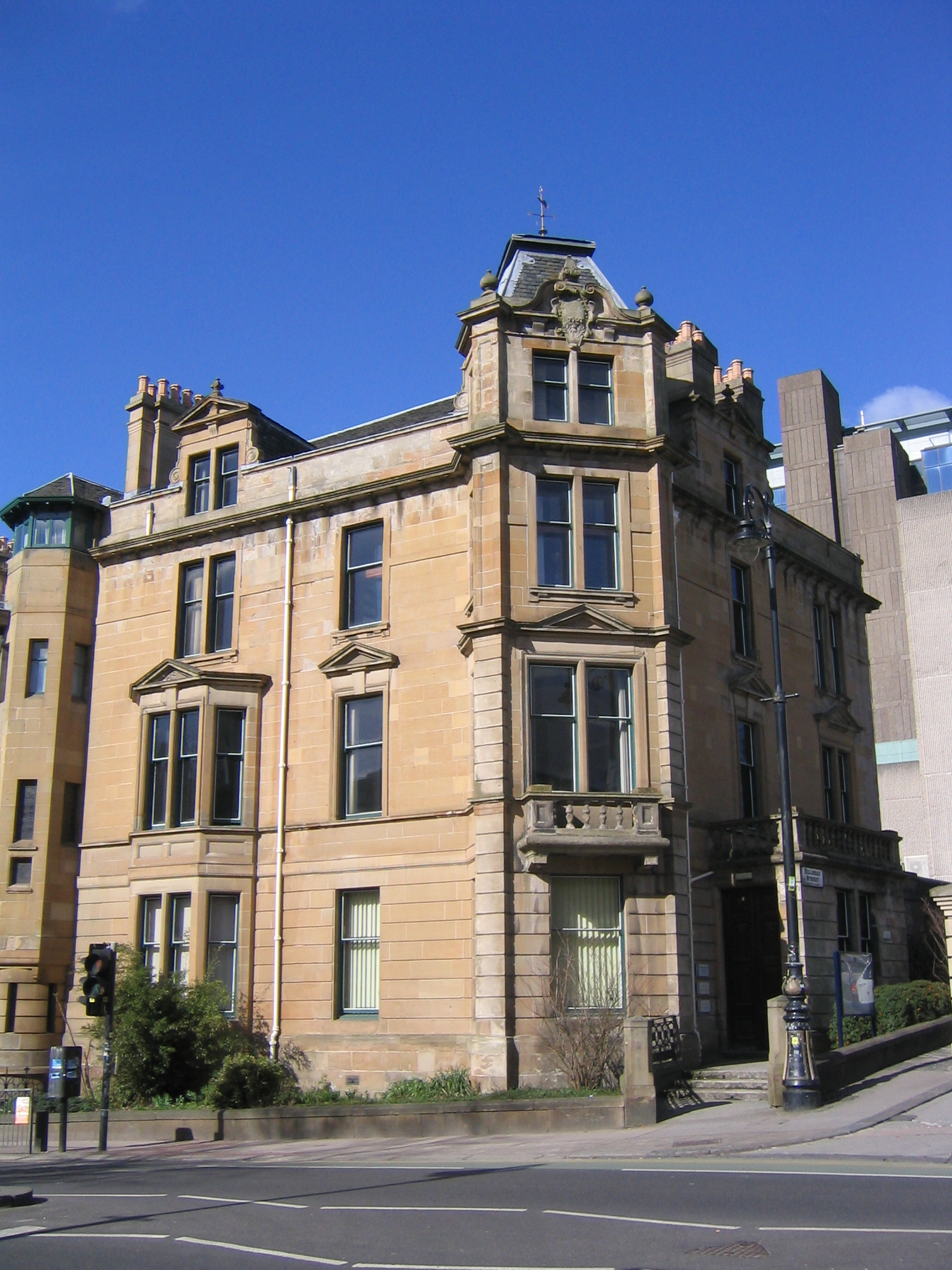
The QM's former home at 1 University Gardens

While the money raised at the bazaar was insufficient for constructing a new building, it was still used to rent a house at 31 Buckingham Terrace. In 1912, the College Club at the University of Glasgow went into liquidation and the QMU took over the premises at 67 Ann Street (now Southpark Terrance). The new premises included a places to read privately, a library, and rooms for clubs and societies to use. A cake stall was held to help pay for the upkeep of the building.

Integration of the two unions became less popular over the 1920s, with women students arguing for a "Queen Margaret esprit de corps" in opposition to a masculine environment at the university which was becoming more misogynistic.

In 1922, the University Court purchased 1 University Gardens with assistance from a grant given by the Carnegie Trust and gifted it to the QMU. The Union moved to 1 University Gardens (now part of the Department of History), across the road from the Glasgow University Union (GUU, which only admitted men) in the John McIntyre Building. The Great Depression led to a drop in membership

During this period, the QM Union mostly provided space for its members to study, discuss, debate and eat.

In 1932, the QM Union moved from 1 University Gardens to the John McIntyre Building as the GUU had moved to a new location.

At this time in its history the QMU was beginning to explore, rather successfully, in the world of university debating. Men and other delegates were allowed to attend but only as "distinguished strangers", who sat in a separate gallery. Other facilities included a library, dining room, study space, and cubicles so that members who lived at home outwith the city centre could stay over after public transport had ended.

In 1968 the QMU moved into a building at 22 University Gardens which was built to accommodate the Union. The University Grants Committee, at the request of the University Court, provided the funds for the new building. The QMU was granted a Coat of arms by the Lord Lyon, James Monteith Grant in 1970.

The women of the QMU were often involved in the debating circuit and especially in Rectorial elections and campaigns at the university. Musical acts starting appearing at the QMU with The Move playing there in April 1968.

The division of the sexes at Glasgow became more questioned following the passing of the Sex Discrimination Act 1975. The two unions had an agreement allowing reciprocal use of much of each other's facilities, but the QMU allowed men to use the bulk of its facilities with a few restrictions, while the GUU confined women only to its extension. As the 1970s came to a close, several men had requested to join the QMU.

The Union held an extraordinary general meeting on 13 March 1979, leading to Michael McCullough to become the first male member of the QMU and for the constitution to be changed to allow men to become members. The building was also renovated to install a disco suite, showers and men's bathrooms.

=== 1979-present ===
A fire in 1982 shut the building and the Union had to deal with financial problems throughout the 1980s, however they were financially solvent again by the 1990s.

In 1986, the QMU banned an issue of the Glasgow Guardian due to an interview with the South African Consul-General for Scotland. President Richard Gass stated that the issue was banned due to platforming racism.

The early 1990s saw the QMU stage Nirvana, Soundgarden, Smashing Pumpkins, Hole, Garbage and Belle & Sebastian. This continued with bands such as Coldplay, Biffy Clyro and Franz Ferdinand playing on the same stage in the 2000s. In 2016, Troye Sivan performed at the venue marking his first visit to Scotland on his blue neighbourhood tour.

The late 1990s until the early 2000s saw the QMU redevelop many of its social and commercial areas, including all of its bars. Other recent notable events at the QMU have included supporting Charles Kennedy in his successful campaign to become Rector.

In 2007 and 2009, qmunicate, the QMU's member-run fortnightly publication, won the Best Magazine Award at The Herald Scottish Student Press Awards. It was shortlisted in 2006, 2008 and 2010. In 2010 Ruaraidh J MacIntyre, qmunicate's resident columnist won the 'Best Columnist' award at the Herald Student Press Awards.

The Union was again faced with financial difficulty in the 2000s as a result of the University of Glasgow cutting the block grant – the money annually supplied to both unions – by around half. This, exacerbated by the 2008 financial crisis, meant the Union saw several consecutive years of financial loss. Responding to these financial difficulties, work by successive boards of management to engage with University management led to parity of funding with the Glasgow University Union for the first time in 2010 and the subsequent reinstatement of the block grant in 2011. However, many changes in the tastes, lifestyles and expectations of students have left the Queen Margaret Union - and many other student unions - facing severe problems.

Due to the COVID-19 pandemic, the QMU closed most of its facilities and came into controversy for not reinstating 31 members of staff that were laid off prior to Rishi Sunak's announcement of the furlough scheme on 20 March. In response, the QMU announced that it had reinstated all staff until 31 May. The Union came under further criticism in June 2020 again by Unite the Union and also former University Rector Aamer Anwar for firing the 31 staff instead of continuing to furlough them. The QMU's President Courtney Hughes said that furloughing staff would cause financial difficulties in the future. The CEO of the Union, Margaret Davidson reasoned that there would be far more job seekers in August after changes in the furlough scheme occur, so firing their staff earlier was better as many employers were recruiting, and also stated that there were financial reasons for the layoffs.

The QMU also defaulted on its charity status by failing to supply information to OSCR, which was claimed to be as a result of COVID-19 delaying the auditing process.

In 2025, the QMU walked out of a group photo during freshers' week at the university's quadrangle, after refusing to remove a Palestinian flag from the photo.

== Relationship with other student organisations ==
There are two Unions at the University of Glasgow with some students choosing to join both of them during, and after, Freshers' week. In 2003–2004, both Unions attempted to change their Constitutions to allow for Automatic Joint Student Membership.

The University of Glasgow is not affiliated to the National Union of Students (NUS), with the QMU instead being part of Northern Services, a purchasing consortium set up by the students unions of Edinburgh. In 2006, a referendum was held to ask the students of the university whether it should affiliate with the NUS, during which the QMU formed part of the "No to NUS" campaign.

== Governance ==
=== Initial Governance ===
When established in 1890, the Committee of the QMU was initially made up of representatives from the Queen Margaret College's classes, along with two former students. The initial committee was then decided as:

- History: Miss Young
- German Literature: Miss Watson
- German Language: Miss Menzies
- German Tutorial: Miss Carrick
- French Literature: Miss Story
- French Language: Miss Mackay
- Chemistry: Miss Fraser
- Natural Philosophy: Miss Gilchrist
- Moral Philosophy: Miss McIntosh
- Logic: Miss Black
- English Literature: Miss Blacklock and Miss Fraser
- Art: Miss Jolly
- Latin: Miss Cumming
- Music: Miss Allen
- Former Students: Miss Duguid and Miss Robertson

=== Modern Governance ===
The QMU is run by a student Board of Management in which elections for positions are held bi-annually. The names of the Presidents of the Union are preserved on a board in the main stairwell of the Union and photographs of each entire Board of Management are taken at the start of their term of office and displayed on the walls of the Board Room.

The Board is divided into three main parts. The Executive, Convenors and Current Student Representatives.

The Executive comprises the offices of President, and two Vice Presidents (Vice President: Membership, Clubs and Societies and Vice President: Board of Management) and are charged with the day-to-day running of the union and maintaining a high level of discipline, member and clubs and societies involvement and representing the union externally. They oversee every event, operation and campaign within the Union. They also act as trustees.

The archives of the QMU are maintained by the Archives of the University of Glasgow (GUAS).

The Convenors are each responsible for running the committees and cover an aspect of the unions' activity. The current convenors as of January 2026 are:

- Campaigns Convenor: Chairs the Campaigns Committee which oversees all Union fundraising and campaigns. Fundraising for local, national and international charities and campaigning for wider causes has been an integral part of the Queen Margaret Union for many years.
- Events Convenor: Chairs the Events Committee which assist in the planning and running of QM-run events that take place in the Union (e.g. Q the Music).
- Publications Convenor: Chairs the Publications Committee (Also colloquially referred to as Pubs), which are responsible for all Union publications, namely the production and distribution of Qmunicate magazine, the Union's in-house news and views magazine.
- Social Convenor: Chairs the Social Committee, who are concerned with the planning and execution of the events that take place every day in Jim's Bar and Games Bar. Includes pub quizzes, open mics
- Technical Convenor: Chairs the Tech Committee/Tech Team, who are involved with the practicalities of running the QM's events, including lighting and sound tech. Unlike other convenors, Tech team jobs often involve payment as freelancers.
- Welfare Convenor. Chairs the Welfare Committee, which are involved in planning events and campaigns to help with students mental health such as de-stress days.
- Communications Convenor: Chairs the Communications Committee, which are closely involved with the advertising and promotion of the Union and its events.

The last section of the board are the Current Student Representatives. The 'CSR Committee' is composed of twelve elected students, at least three of whom are in their first year of study, who are largely free to involve themselves with whatever aspects of the union they see fit. A Convenor of Current Student Representatives (CCSR) is elected from amongst them to represent the committee as a whole to the Executive and Convenors. CSRs must sit on at least two committees.

In addition to this, the Board of Management contains two Former Student Members, the Past President, Honorary President and two Honorary Vice Presidents.

== Facilities ==
The QMU offers a number of facilities over four floors. Aside from general facilities, the Union's facilities include:

=== Ground floor ===
- Venue: the Union's primary venue is used to host club nights and gigs, with a capacity of approximately 900. Amongst the most famous bands to have played there on their way to making it big are Queen (15 March 1974), Red Hot Chili Peppers (3 February 1990) and Nirvana (30 November 1991), as have other more recent bands such as Biffy Clyro. It has also been used for large pub quizzes, and for shows organised by affiliated clubs and societies.
- Pekopanda Takeaway
- Cafe: Originally opened in 2014 as Cafe Twenty2
- Accessible toilets

=== First floor ===
- Jim's Bar: Many small Union events are run in Bar, including the Big Wednesday Night Pub Quiz (described by NME as the best in Glasgow).
- Games Bar: the QMU's sports bar, complete with pool tables. Previously called the Champions Bar

=== Second Floor ===
- Pekopanda Restaurant: A restaurant serving Asian fusion style cuisine.
- Bistro

=== Third floor ===
- The Executive office
- The Boardroom
- Committee rooms
- Laundry facilities
- Administrative offices
- Gender-neutral toilets (introduced February 2012)

=== Former Facilities ===
- Shop (ran by the SRC)
- Food Factory
- SCRAN
- Quiet Study Room (also previously a Library, where Champions Bar used to be)

== Notable alumni ==
=== Past Presidents of the QMU ===
- Marion Gilchrist 1894-1898
- Marion A. Forbes 1953-1954
- Rona Davidson 1961

=== Other Notable Alumni ===
- Iris Duane, Scottish Greens MSP (Vice-President 2023–24)

== Sources ==
- Union With Many Crowns from Cobain to Queen, Glasgow Herald, 4 January 2008
- Presidential Summit at the QMU, University of Glasgow Newsletter, Issue 279 October 2006
- We thought it was for the posh kids The Herald, April 2006
- Uni Considers Early Smoking Ban BBC News, August 2005
