= Glasgow University Students' Representative Council =

Students' union in Scotland

- Institution: University of Glasgow
- Location: Glasgow, Scotland
- Established: 9 March 1886
- President: Molly Corbett
- Members: c. 38,000
- Address: McIntyre Building, University Avenue, Glasgow G12 8QQ
- Website: www.glasgowstudent.net

The Glasgow University Students' Representative Council, also known simply as the Students' Representative Council or by the acronyms GUSRC and SRC is a student union at the University of Glasgow. Unlike at other universities in the United Kingdom, the University of Glasgow operates a unique system, with four separate and independent bodies providing services to the student body. In contrast with the Glasgow University Union, Queen Margaret Union, and Glasgow University Sports Association, which provide social and sporting facilities for their respective members, the SRC is responsible for representing the views and interests of the student body to the university.

The Students’ Representative Council is recognised as the only representative body at the university under the Universities (Scotland) Act 1889 and subsequent enactments. The other student bodies have limited representation on University Committees to enable the university to support their work, but the SRC is the only representative body and consequently the only student body to hold positions on the University Senate and University Court. Upon enrolment at the university, all students automatically become members of the SRC, although they are entitled to opt out of this membership.

In addition to its representative function, the Students’ Representative Council runs events for students at the university. These include the university’s Freshers’ Week (in collaboration with the other student bodies) and its Freshers’ Fair; welfare initiatives; support for 300 clubs and societies; and housing and funding the university's Glasgow Guardian newspaper and other student media.

Originally located in Pearce Lodge, the SRC is now housed in the McIntyre Building on University Avenue.

== History ==
The Students’ Representative Council was founded on 9 March 1886. Despite its contemporary independence from the Glasgow University Union, members of the Union founded the SRC in order to lobby the university to fund the creation of a building for the Union they had founded the previous year. In 1890, the university agreed to construct the John McIntyre Building, now the offices of the SRC, for the Glasgow University Union.

Prior to the establishment of the Students’ Representative Council, the only official representation of the student body was carried out through the Rector and clubs established to support Rectorial campaigns, such as the Peel Club.

In 1932, the Glasgow University Union relocated to its own building at 32 University Avenue, where it remains today, with the John McIntyre Building then housing the all-female Queen Margaret Union. At this time, the SRC was housed in the Pearce Lodge, the former gatehouse of the university's old site on the High Street which had been reassembled at Gilmorehill. After the Queen Margaret Union relocated to its current location in 1969, the SRC’s offices moved into the then-John McIntyre Building. The building was later renamed to simply the McIntyre Building to reflect that John McIntyre’s gift of £5,000 (equal to around £300,000 in 2010) was donated in memory of his wife Anne.

In February 1982 it banned the Daily Record for being sold.

=== Notable former officers ===
A number of former Students' Representative Council officer bearers have gone on to careers in politics and public service, including:

- Jamie Hepburn, Member of the Scottish Parliament (Senior Vice-President)
- Angela Constance, Member of the Scottish Parliament (President, 1991–92)
- Alasdair Allan, Member of the Scottish Parliament (Senior Vice-President, 1991–92)
- Ron Donachie, actor (President, 1976–77) (as Ronald Porter)
- John Lamberton Bell, minister and hymn-writer, Rector of the University (President, 1974–75)
- Donald Dewar, First Minister of Scotland (Honorary Secretary, 1959–60)
- Sir William Kerr Fraser, civil servant, Chancellor of the University (President, 1951–52)
- Robert Gibson, Lord Gibson, Member of Parliament and Chairman of the Scottish Land Court (President, 1910–11)
- Sir Robert Horne, Chancellor of the Exchequer (President, 1892–93)
- Liam Fox, Member of Parliament (General Representative, 1981–82)
- John Nicolson, Member of Parliament (General Representative, 1982–83)
- Nicola Sturgeon, First Minister of Scotland (General Representative)
- Alistair Carmichael, Member of Parliament (Unknown, 1982–83)
- Alberto Costa, Member of Parliament (President, 1995–96)

== Representation ==
The SRC comprises 53 representatives, four of whom are general representatives and two of whom are first-year representatives. Elections to all positions are held annually in the spring, with a secondary election in the autumn to fill any academic or welfare positions left vacant and to elect general and first-year representatives. In addition to the elected members, the Presidents of the Glasgow University Union, Queen Margaret Union, and Glasgow University Sports Association are invited to attend meetings, as is the immediate Past President of the SRC.

University departments are responsible for organising the election of individual class representatives, who are supported in their duties by the Vice-President (Education) and their college's convenor. The academic convenors sit on various committees within their Faculty and are ex officio members of the Senate. The four sabbatical officers are also accorded membership of the Senate, while the President and a Court Assessor (elected by the Council) are entitled to sit on the University Court. The Council also elects representatives to numerous university committees, including the Health, Safety & Well-being Committee, the Library Committee and the Academic Dress Committee.

The SRC is also home to the Rector of the University, elected by the students to represent them. This is achieved primarily through the Rector's role as chair of the University Court. The incumbent Rector is Ghassan Abu-Sittah, a plastic surgeon and activist. Abu-Sittah was elected in April 2024 and will serve until April 2028.

Glasgow University SRC is represented at a national level by the Coalition of Higher Education Students in Scotland (CHESS), the National Postgraduate Committee (NPC), and the Aldwych Group.

== Services ==
The SRC provides the following non-representative services to students at the University:

- Advice Centre - free and confidential advice
- GU Volunteering - opportunities for students
- Jobshop - a job vacancies service
- Secondhand Bookshop - students can buy and sell course texts
- Nightline - an anonymous, confidential telephone support and information service
- Photocopying - photocopying service available for students at the University

Until 2004 the SRC ran a shop selling stationery, newspapers, snacks and University merchandise. It was housed in the "HUB" building beside the university library, now refurbished as the Fraser Building.

== Media ==
The SRC also partly funds and houses four student media groups. They retain editorial independence from the SRC whilst benefiting from its support. Many of those involved in the SRC's student media have won awards for their work and gone on to find a career in the media.

These groups are:

- Glasgow University Guardian - fortnightly newspaper
- Glasgow University Magazine (GUM) - termly magazine
- Glasgow University Student Television (GUST) - broadcast online and via screens around campus
- Subcity Radio - internet radio station

The SRC previously referred to the media as "publications" and until 2004 the SRC website glasgowstudent.net was run as a fifth media group. There are other student run media groups at the university, housed within the unions, including G-YOU, published by the Glasgow University Union, and qmunicate, published by the Queen Margaret Union.
