= List of University of Glasgow people =

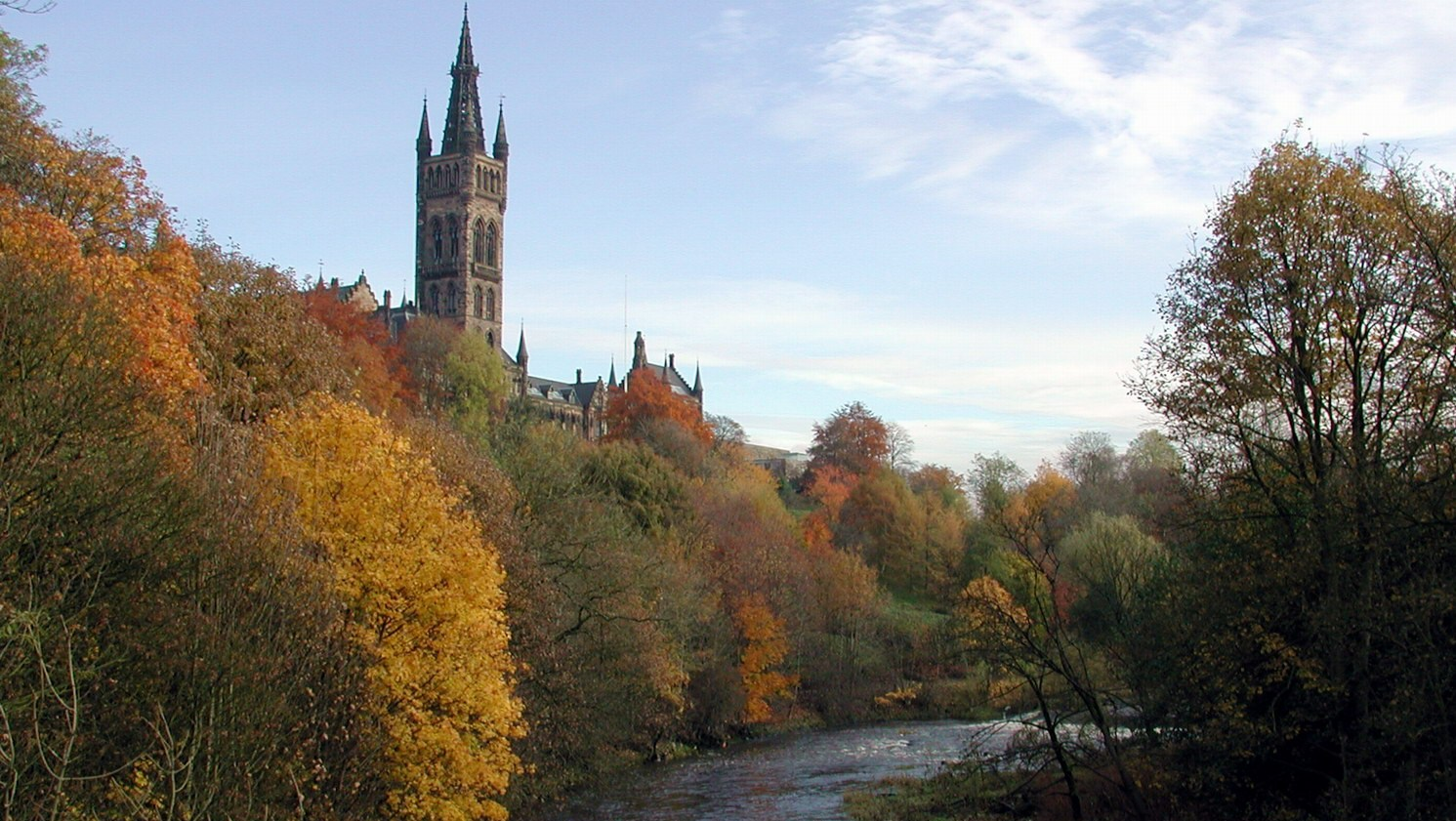
The University of Glasgow overlooking the River Kelvin and Kelvingrove Park

The following well-known people have studied or taught at the University of Glasgow since its inception in 1451. Historical lists of chancellors, rectors and principals of the university are contained in those offices' respective articles.

== Nobel laureates ==
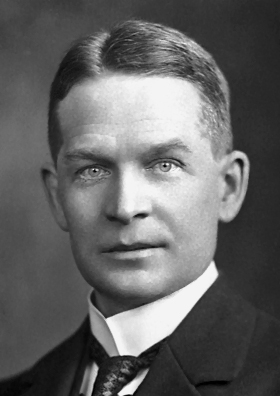
Frederick Soddy

- Sir Derek Barton, winner of the Nobel Prize in Chemistry
- Sir James Black, winner of the Nobel Prize in Medicine
- Sir Robert Geoffrey Edwards, awarded the Nobel Prize in Physiology or Medicine
- David MacMillan, awarded the Nobel Prize in Chemistry
- John Boyd Orr, 1st Baron Boyd-Orr, biologist and winner of the Nobel Peace Prize
- Sir William Ramsay, winner of the Nobel Prize in Chemistry
- Frederick Soddy, winner of the Nobel Prize in Chemistry
- Alexander R. Todd, Baron Todd, winner of the Nobel Prize in Chemistry

== Arts ==
- Sir Drummond Bone, Byron scholar and Master of Balliol College, Oxford
- Hannah Frank, artist and sculptor
- Peter Mullan, actor and filmmaker
- Alexander Stoddart, Her Majesty's Sculptor in Ordinary for Scotland
- Alison Yarrington, art historian

=== Classics ===
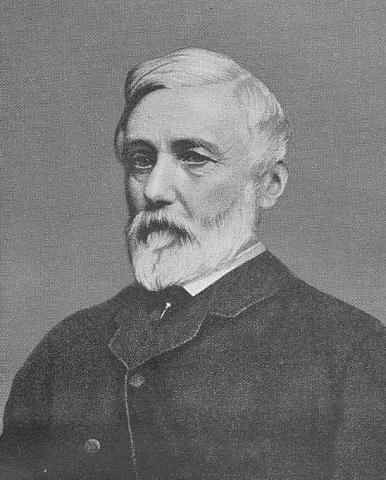
William Young Sellar

- Douglas Cairns, Professor of Classics at the University of Edinburgh
- D. B. Campbell, ancient historian
- Lewis Campbell, classical scholar
- Nan Dunbar, known for her 1995 edition of Aristophanes' The Birds
- Sir James Frazer, author of The Golden Bough; a founder in the field of anthropology
- Gilbert Highet, classicist and literary historian
- Richard Claverhouse Jebb, classical scholar and politician
- Gilbert Murray, classical scholar
- William Young Sellar, classical scholar

=== History ===
- John Bannerman, historian, noted for his work on Gaelic Scotland
- Robert Browning, Byzantinist
- Sir William Wilson Hunter, historian, Indologist
- Sir Richard Lodge, historian
- John Duncan Mackie, Scottish historian
- F. Marian McNeill, social historian and author of The Silver Bough
- Charlotte Methuen, church and Reformation historian
- Hew Strachan, historian
- Bernard Wasserstein, historian

=== Musicians ===
Sydney MacEwan

- Paul Buchanan, Robert Bell and Paul Joseph Moore of The Blue Nile
- Neil Clark, Lloyd Cole, Blair Cowan, Lawrence Donegan and Stephen Irvine of Lloyd Cole and the Commotions
- Isaac Hirshow, cantor and composer
- Sydney MacEwan, tenor, singer of Scottish and Irish traditional songs
- Stuart Murdoch, musician and songwriter; principal member of Belle & Sebastian
- Simon Neil, lead vocalist, guitarist and principal songwriter of Biffy Clyro
- Albert Lister Peace, the university's organist between 1870 and 1880
- Emeli Sandé, R&B, soul and breakbeat singer/songwriter
- Ramesh Srivastava, musician and songwriter; principal member of Voxtrot

=== Philosophy and theology ===
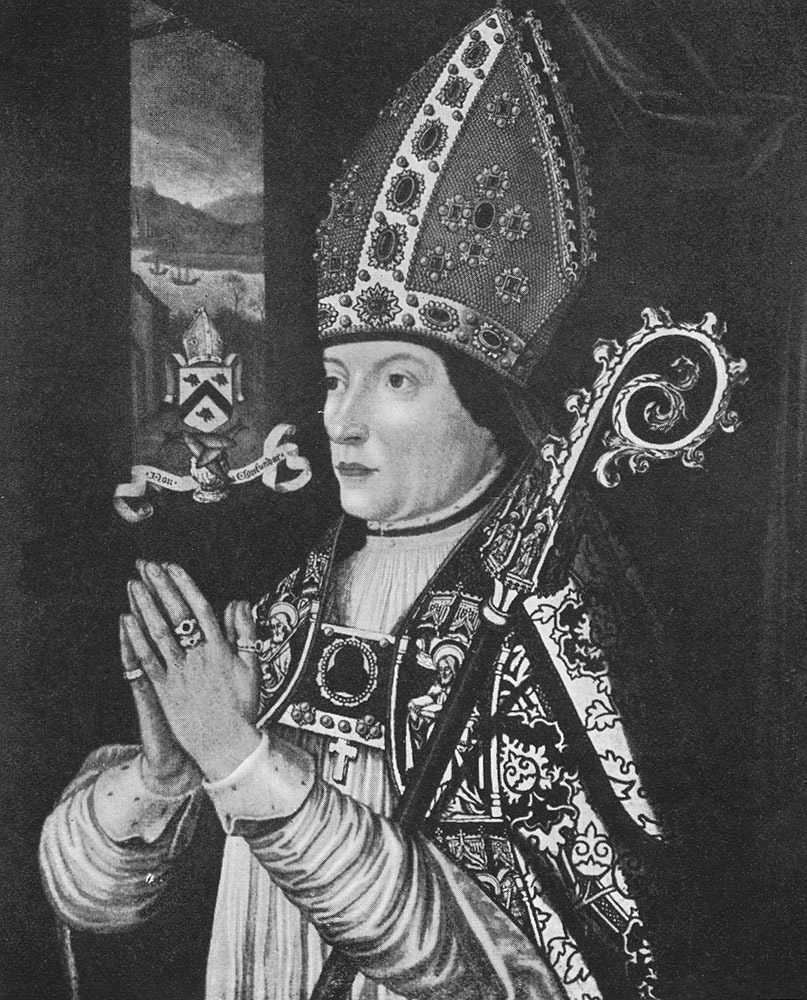
William Elphinstone

David Livingstone

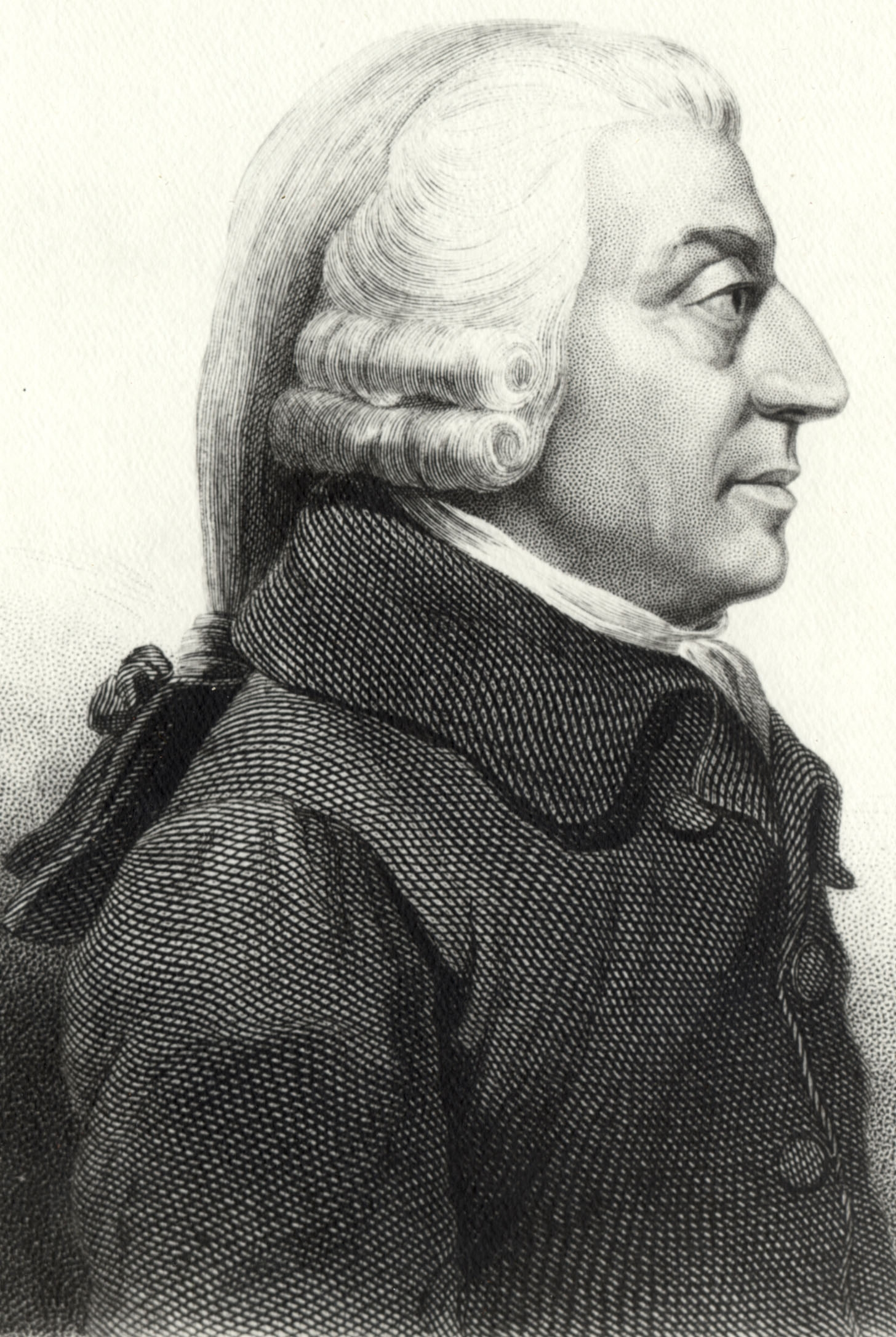
Adam Smith

- John Abernethy, Irish Presbyterian leader
- David Stow Adam, theologian
- William Adam, Baptist minister, missionary, abolitionist
- William Menzies Alexander, medical and theological writer
- John Anderson, Scottish-Australian philosopher, founded the empirical brand of philosophy known as Australian realism
- Alexander Bain, philosopher
- William Barclay, theologian
- David Beaton, cardinal and Archbishop of St. Andrews
- James Beaton, Archbishop of Glasgow and St. Andrews, Primate of Scotland
- Zachary Boyd, theologian
- John Caird, theologian and preacher, principal and vice-chancellor of the University of Glasgow (1873–98)
- Alexander Campbell, co-founder of the Restoration Movement
- Neil Campbell, minister, principal of the University of Glasgow (1727 to 1761)
- Tom Campbell, philosopher and jurist
- Semyon Desnitsky, legal scholar, professor of the Moscow University
- William Elphinstone, statesman and bishop, founder of the University of Aberdeen
- Patrick Forbes, Chancellor of Aberdeen University and Bishop of Aberdeen
- William Hugh Clifford Frend, early church historian
- Francis Hutcheson, philosopher
- David Jasper, leader in study of literature and theology
- John Knox, religious reformer and theologian
- Cosmo Lang, Archbishop of Canterbury
- Kung Lap-yan, Hong Kong public theologian
- David Livingstone, missionary
- John Macquarrie, leading 20th century theologian and Professor of Divinity at Union Theological Seminary (NY) and Oxford
- William McIntyre, minister and educator
- Andrew Melville, theologian and religious reformer
- George Newlands, theologian
- Alexander Peden, one of the leading figures in the Covenanter movement in Scotland
- R Guy Ramsay, Baptist minister and President of the Baptist Union of Scotland, 1948–49
- Thomas Reid, philosopher
- Daniel Sandford, Bishop of Tasmania
- Adam Smith, economist and philosopher
- Tiyo Soga, minister infuential intellectual, translator and hymn composer
- Dugald Stewart, philosopher
- Archibald Campbell Tait, Archbishop of Canterbury

=== Writers and poets ===
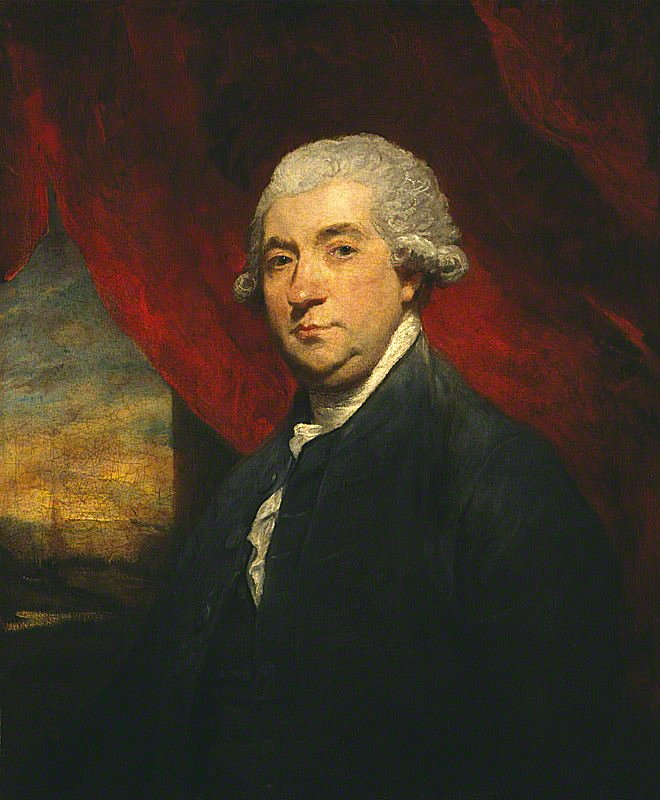
James Boswell

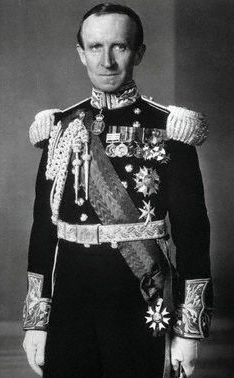
John Buchan, 1st Baron Tweedsmuir

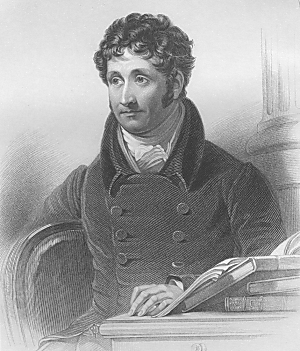
Thomas Campbell

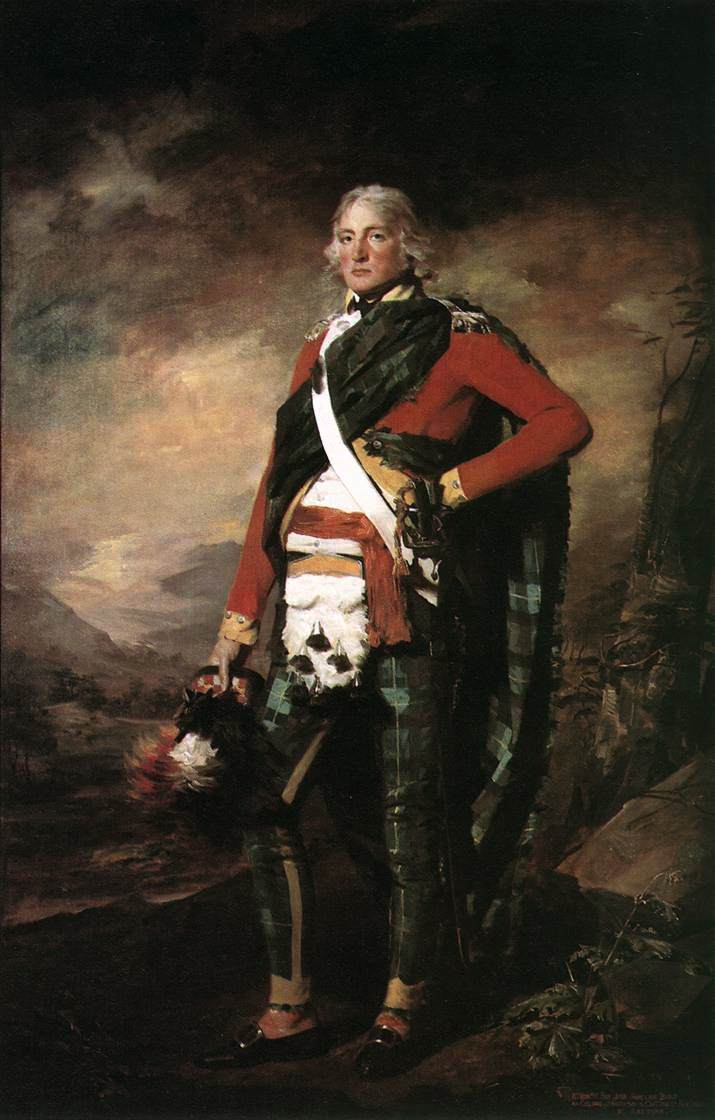
Sir John Sinclair

- Archibald Alison, Scottish episcopalian priest and essayist
- Lin Anderson, writer
- Julie Bertagna, writer
- James Boswell, writer
- William Boyd, writer
- James Bridie (Osborne Henry Mavor), dramatist and founder of the Glasgow Citizens' Theatre
- Christopher Brookmyre, writer
- Luke Brown, writer
- John Buchan, 1st Baron Tweedsmuir, writer and Governor General of Canada
- Robert Williams Buchanan, poet
- C. Delisle Burns, atheist and secularist writer and lecturer
- Thomas Campbell, poet
- Alexander Carlyle, church leader, autobiographer
- Robert Crawford, poet, Professor of English at the University of St Andrews
- A. J. Cronin, physician and writer who's given credit for inspiring the National Health Service
- Ann Marie Di Mambro, playwright and scriptwriter
- Hal Duncan, writer
- Jane Duncan (Elizabeth Jane Cameron), writer
- Dimitra Fimi, writer and academic
- Fraser Frisell, friend of Chateaubriand
- Janice Galloway, writer
- Robert Cunninghame Graham of Gartmore, poet and politician
- Alasdair Gray, writer and artist
- David Gray, poet
- Janice Hally, playwright and scriptwriter
- Thomas Hamilton, among the 'Glasgow School' of early nineteenth century Scottish novelists
- Robert Henryson, poet (probably taught)
- James Herriot, writer
- Philip Hobsbaum, poet and critic
- Clare Hunter, artist and writer
- John Jamieson, lexicographer
- James Kelman, writer
- Walter Kennedy, poet
- Tom Leonard, poet and essayist
- Liz Lochhead, poet and dramatist
- Helen MacInnes, "queen of spy writers"
- Alistair MacLean, writer
- Ken MacLeod, writer
- Alasdair MacMhaighstir Alasdair, Gaelic bard and Jacobite captain
- Aonghas MacNeacail, Gaelic poet
- Laura Marney, writer
- Angus Matheson (1912–1962), inaugural Professor of Celtic at the University of Glasgow
- William McIllvanney, writer
- Caroline Moir, writer
- Edwin Morgan, poet
- Seamus Perry, academic and writer
- Sir Daniel Keyte Sandford, Scottish politician and Greek scholar
- Robert William Service, poet and writer
- Jane Shaw, writer
- J David Simons, writer
- Sir John Sinclair, 1st Baronet, writer and the first person to use the word "statistics" in the English language
- Tobias Smollett, writer
- Derick Thomson, Gaelic writer and academic
- Alexander Trocchi, writer
- John Wilson, writer

== Business ==
- James Blyth, Baron Blyth of Rowington, chairman of Diageo
- Keith Cochrane, chief executive of Weir Group
- Alexander Fleck, 1st Baron Fleck, chairman of ICI
- Douglas Flint, chairman of HSBC
- Fred Goodwin, former chief executive of the Royal Bank of Scotland Group
- Hugh Grant, chief executive of the Monsanto Company, St. Louis, Missouri, US
- David MacBrayne, founder of the shipping company that later became Caledonian MacBrayne, now David MacBrayne, Ltd.
- James McGill, Scottish-Canadian fur-trader and philanthropist, endowed McGill University
- Tom McKillop, former chairman of the Royal Bank of Scotland Group
- David Nish, chief executive of Standard Life plc

== Civil service ==
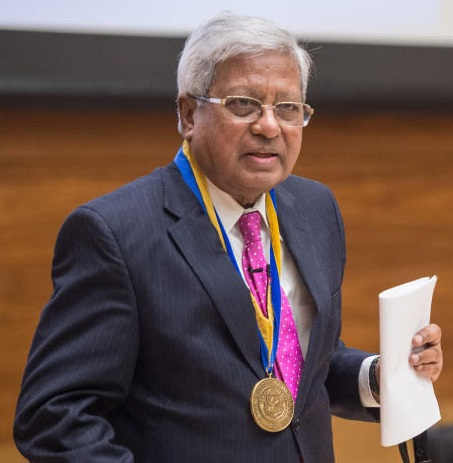
Sir Fazle Hasan Abed

- Sir Fazle Hasan Abed, founder of world's largest NGO, BRAC
- Mushtaq Ahmad, Lord Lieutenant of Lanarkshire
- David Bell, Vice-Chancellor of the University of Reading, previously Permanent Secretary of the Department for Education
- Henry Beveridge, famous orientalist and member of Indian Civil Service joined in 1857; elected president of The Asiatic Society of Bengal (1890–91)
- James Bonar, civil servant, political economist and historian of economic thought
- John Cairncross, in 1936, scored double first (domestic & foreign service) in Civil Service exam, alleged to be one of the Cambridge Five
- Sir Matthew Campbell, Secretary of the Department of Agriculture and Fisheries for Scotland
- Sir Oliver Franks, influential civil servant in postwar Britain
- Sir Bill Jeffrey, Permanent Secretary at the Ministry of Defence
- Paul Johnston, British diplomat
- Ken McCallum, Director General of MI5
- Francis J. Meehan, 1924–2022, American diplomat involved in events depicted in the 2015 Steven Spielberg film Bridge of Spies
- Sir Muir Russell, Permanent Secretary to the Scottish Executive
- Francis Richard John Sandford, 1st Baron Sandford, instrumental in implementing the Elementary Education Act of 1870

== Law ==
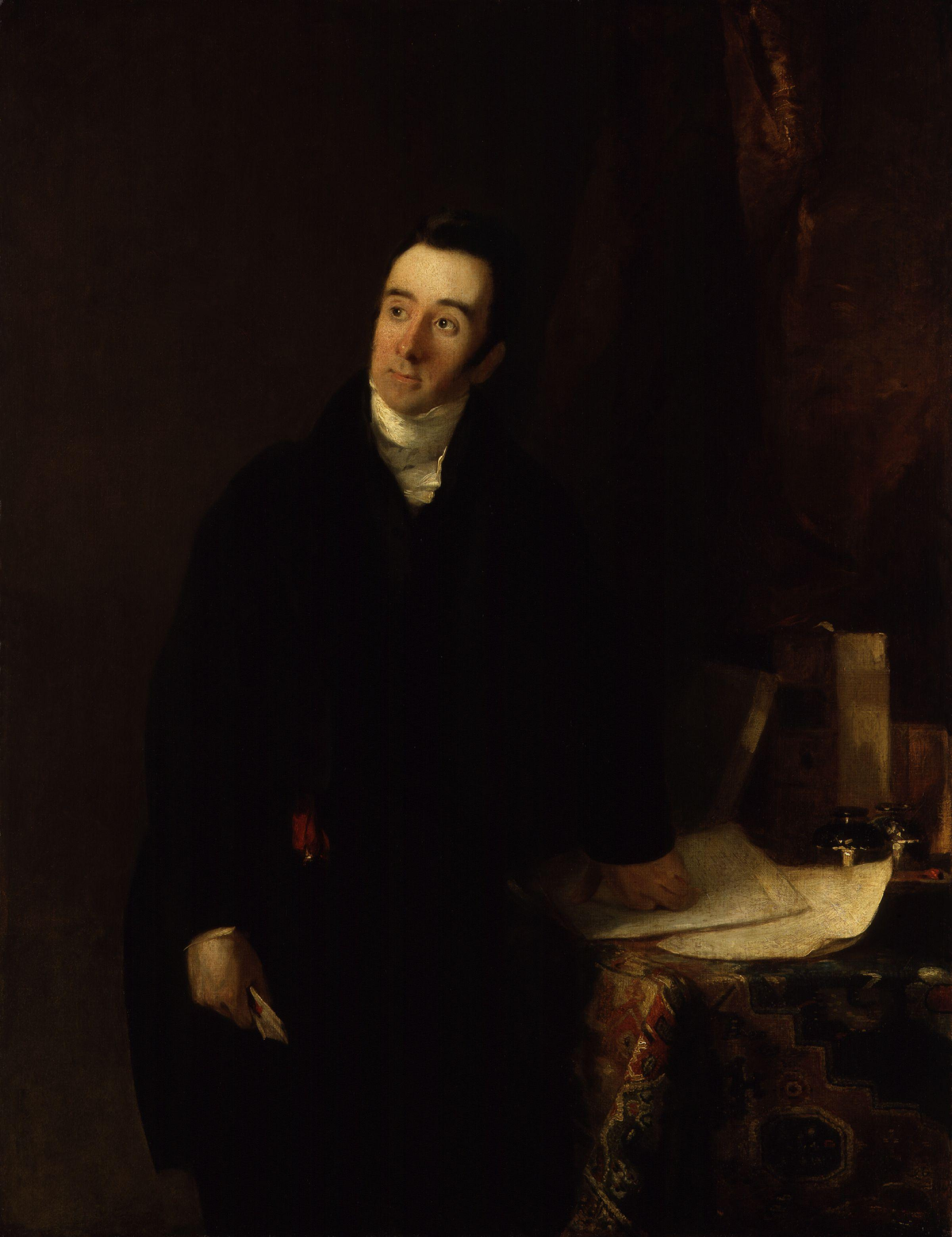
Francis Jeffrey, Lord Jeffrey

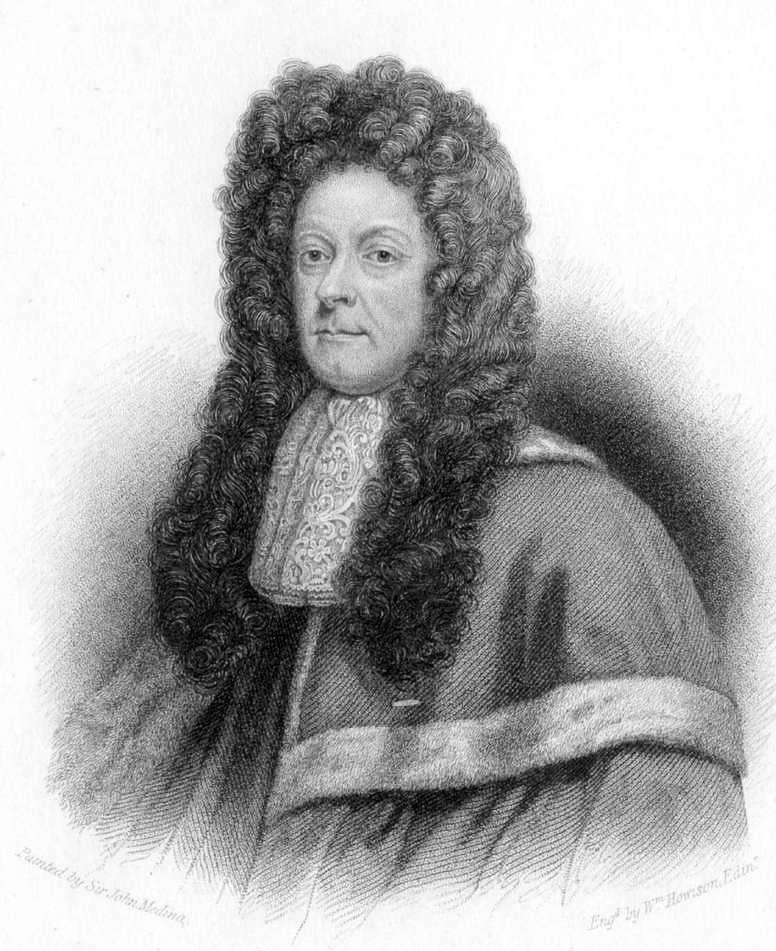
James Dalrymple,1st Viscount of Stair

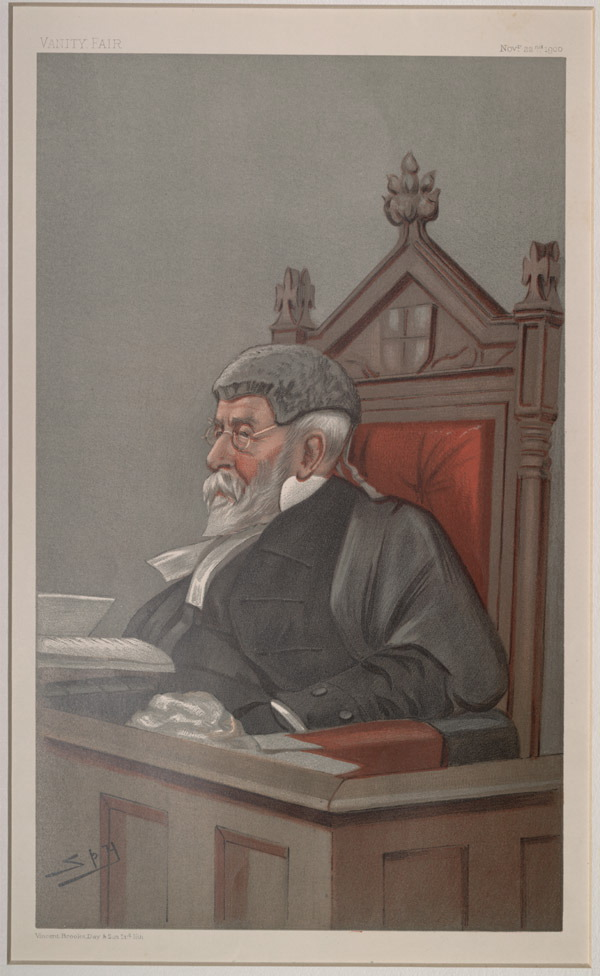
Robert Malcolm Kerr

- Joseph Beltrami, Glasgow defence lawyer who secured the first Royal Pardon issued in Scotland
- Sir David King Murray, Lord Birnam (1884–1955), Solicitor-General for Scotland, Senator of the College of Justice
- Harald Leslie, Lord Birsay, Chairman of the Scottish Land Court
- Iain Bonomy, Lord Bonomy, Senator of the College of Justice and Judge of the International Criminal Tribunal for the former Yugoslavia
- James Boyle, legal academic, William Neal Reynolds Professor of Law at Duke University School of Law
- Robert Hodshon Cay, Judge Admiral of Scotland overseeing naval trials and maternal grandfather of James Clerk Maxwell
- James Chadwin QC, barrister who represented Peter Sutcliffe (the "Yorkshire Ripper")
- Matthew Clarke, Lord Clarke, Senator of the College of Justice
- Sir John Clerk, 2nd Baronet, politician, lawyer, judge and composer
- Hazel Cosgrove, Lady Cosgrove, first woman judge in Court of Session
- James Dalrymple, 1st Viscount of Stair, 17th century Scottish jurist
- Charles Dickson, Lord Dickson, Lord Advocate and Lord President of the Court of Session
- George Emslie, Lord Emslie, Lord President of the Court of Session
- Henry Erskine, former Lord Advocate
- Brian Gill, Lord Gill, Lord Justice Clerk
- John Inglis, Lord Glencorse, former Lord Advocate and Lord President of the Court of Session, and former Rector of the University
- Thomas Miller, Lord Glenlee, former Lord Advocate and Lord President of the Court of Session, and former Rector of the University
- Arthur Hamilton, Lord Hamilton, Lord President of the Court of Session
- Ian Hamilton, advocate, Scottish Nationalist
- Lord Irvine of Lairg, former Lord Chancellor
- Douglas Jamieson, Lord Jamieson, former Lord Advocate and Senator of the College of Justice
- Lord Jauncey of Tullichettle, Lord of Appeal in Ordinary
- Francis Jeffrey, Lord Jeffrey, Senator of the College of Justice and literary critic
- Robert Malcolm Kerr, Judge of the Guildhall Court in the City of London for 43 years
- Sir Neil MacCormick, Regius Professor of Public Law and the Law of Nature and Nations, University of Edinburgh
- Hugh Macmillan, Baron Macmillan, former Lord Advocate and Lord of Appeal in Ordinary
- Alexander Munro MacRobert, former Lord Advocate
- Professor Gerry Maher, Professor of Criminal Law at the University of Edinburgh, former Law Commissioner
- Hugh Matthews, Lord Matthews, Senator of the College of Justice
- Robin McEwan, Lord McEwan, Senator of the College of Justice
- William Rankine Milligan, Lord Milligan, former Lord Advocate and Senator of the College of Justice
- David Murray (1842–1928), Glasgow solicitor, antiquarian, book-collector, and legal scholar
- Ann Paton, Lady Paton, Senator of the College of Justice
- Ralph Risk (1891–1961), solicitor, lawyer, president of the Law Society of Scotland and senior partner in Maclay Murray & Spens
- Lord Roger of Earlsferry, Lord of Appeal in Ordinary
- Alexander Ure, 1st Baron Strathclyde, former Lord Advocate and Lord President of the Court of Session
- Alan Watson, Civil Law scholar (former Douglas Professor of Civil Law)
- John Wheatley, Baron Wheatley, former Lord Advocate and Lord Justice Clerk, established Scottish Legal Aid system
- Lord Wilson of Langside, former Lord Advocate and Senator of the College of Justice
- Norman Wylie, Lord Wylie, former Lord Advocate and Senator of the College of Justice

== Media ==
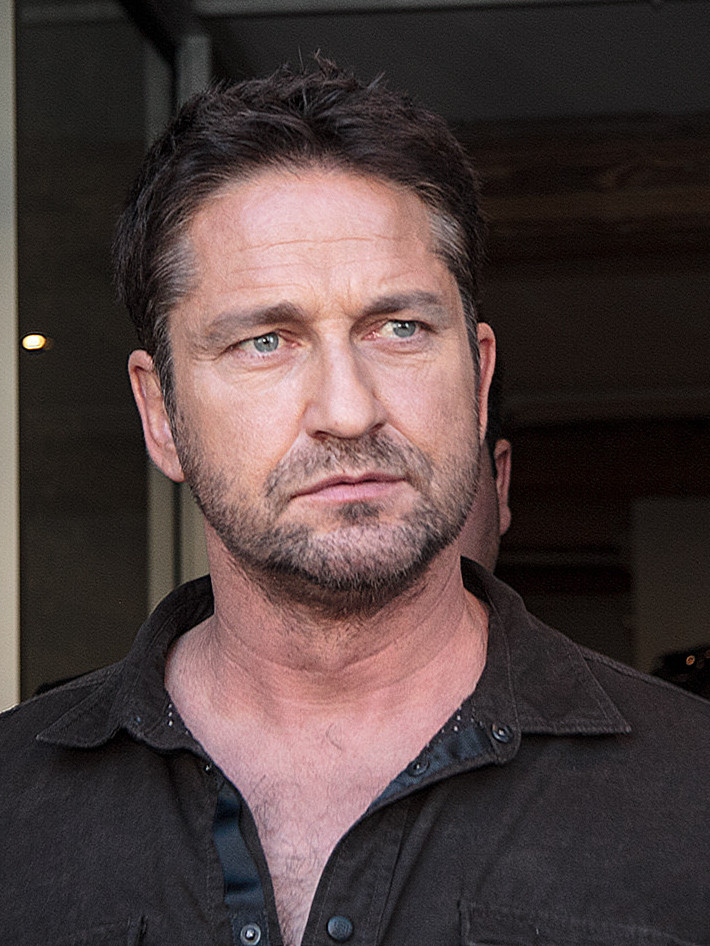
Gerard Butler

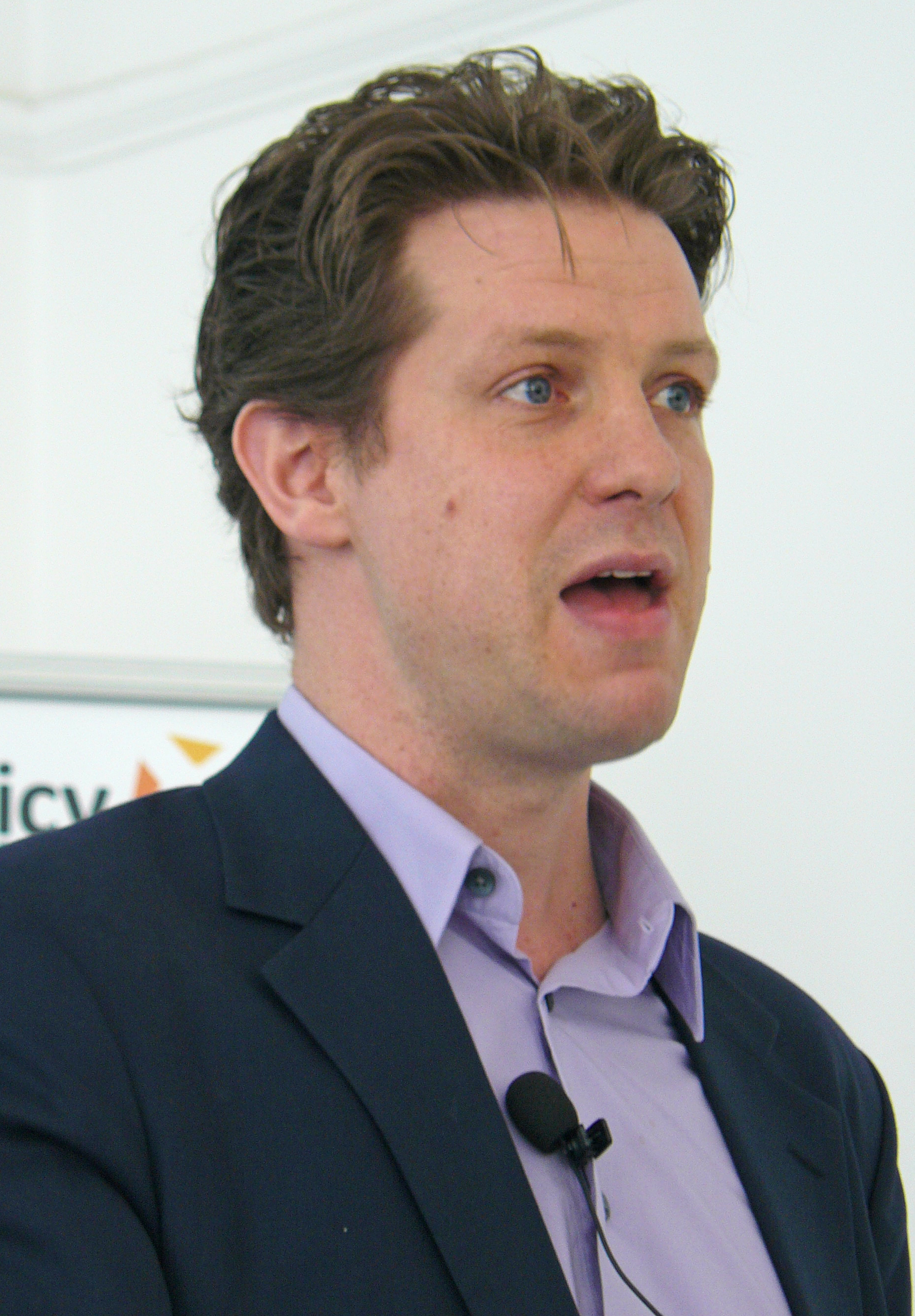
Fraser Nelson

- Ruaridh Arrow, documentary filmmaker
- Raman Bhardwaj, sports broadcaster, STV News
- Gerard Butler, actor
- Susan Calman, comedian and panellist
- Glenn Campbell, Scottish news and current affairs broadcaster
- Andrew Cotter, sports broadcaster
- Richard Gadd, writer and comedian
- John Grierson, filmmaker, "father of the documentary film"
- Duncan Hamilton, columnist for The Scotsman
- Eileen Hayes, author, broadcaster and columnist
- Greg Hemphill, comedian, performer, actor, half of the team in Still Game
- Armando Iannucci, satirist, writer, director, creator of The Thick of It and Veep
- Ford Kiernan, comedian, performer, second half of the team in "Still Game"
- John MacKay, STV News journalist, main anchor
- Anne MacKenzie, television presenter and news anchorwoman
- Hugh Dan MacLennan, sporting academic and broadcaster
- Iain Martin, political commentator, former editor of The Scotsman
- Ian McCaskill, weatherman
- Robin McKie, science editor, The Observer
- Steven Moffat, television writer and producer, showrunner of Doctor Who 2010–2017, co-creator of Sherlock
- Tom Morton, journalist and broadcaster
- Shereen Nanjiani, Scottish journalist
- Andrew Neil, journalist and broadcaster
- Fraser Nelson, editor of The Spectator
- Neil Oliver, archaeologist, historian, author and broadcaster
- David Paisley, actor
- Shantha Roberts, artist and TV presenter
- Sarah Smith, news presenter

== Military ==
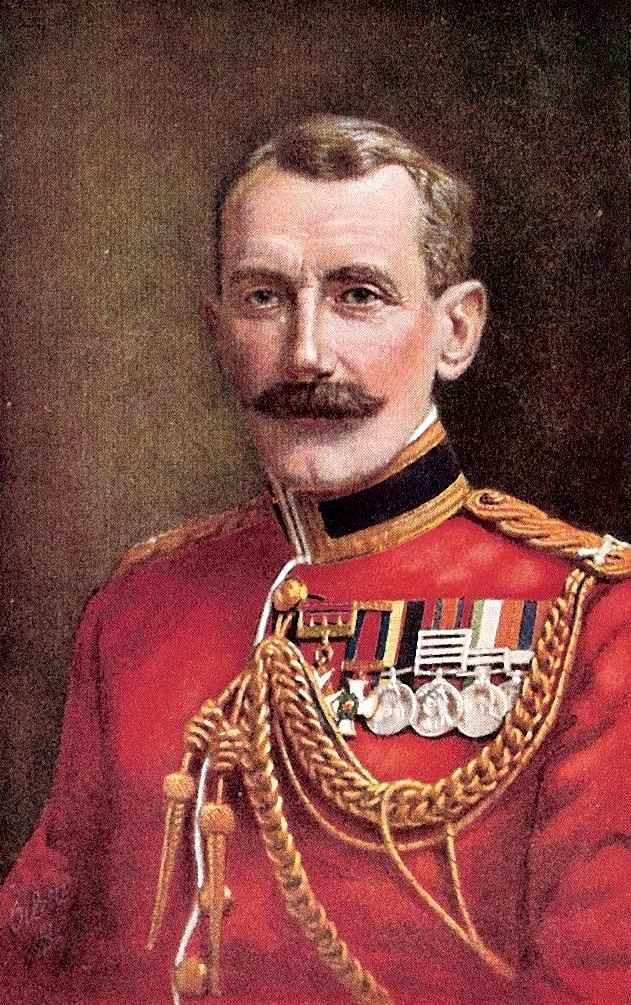
Sir David Henderson

- General Sir Archibald Alison, 2nd Baronet, Scottish soldier who achieved high office
- Air Marshal Stuart Atha, senior officer of the Royal Air Force
- Lieutenant Robert Blair, received the Victoria Cross
- Lieutenant-General Sir Robert Boyd, British Army officer and Governor of Gibraltar
- Archibald Campbell, 9th Earl of Argyll, hereditary chief of Clan Campbell, and a Royalist supporter during the latter stages of the Scottish Civil War and its aftermath
- General William Cathcart, 1st Earl Cathcart, Commander-in-Chief of Scotland and Ambassador to Russia during the Great Patriotic War of 1812
- Major General David Tennant Cowan, distinguished for leading the Indian 17th Infantry Division during almost the entire Burma Campaign
- Colonel James Lennox Dawson, recipient of the Victoria Cross
- Archibald Campbell Fraser of Lovat, 20th MacShimidh (chief) of Clan Fraser of Lovat
- Captain Lord Archibald Hamilton, Lord of the Admiralty
- Lieutenant Colonel James Hamilton, Commandant of the Scots Greys at the Battle of Waterloo
- Lieutenant General James Hamilton, 4th Duke of Hamilton and 1st Duke of Brandon, major investor in the failed Darien Scheme and British ambassador to Louis XIV of France
- Colonel William Hamilton, 2nd Duke of Hamilton, Royalist Commander during the Wars of the Three Kingdoms
- Lieutenant General Sir David Henderson, commander of the Royal Flying Corps and instrumental in establishing the Royal Air Force
- Donald MacKintosh, recipient of the Victoria Cross
- Wing Commander Hector Maclean, Battle of Britain fighter pilot
- Major-general Sir Thomas Munro, 1st Baronet, East India Company Army officer and statesman
- Harry Ranken, recipient of the Victoria Cross
- Sir John Snell, royalist soldier in the English Civil War, founded the Snell Exhibition
- General Simon Fraser of Lovat, the 19th Chief of the Clan Fraser of Lovat

== Politics ==
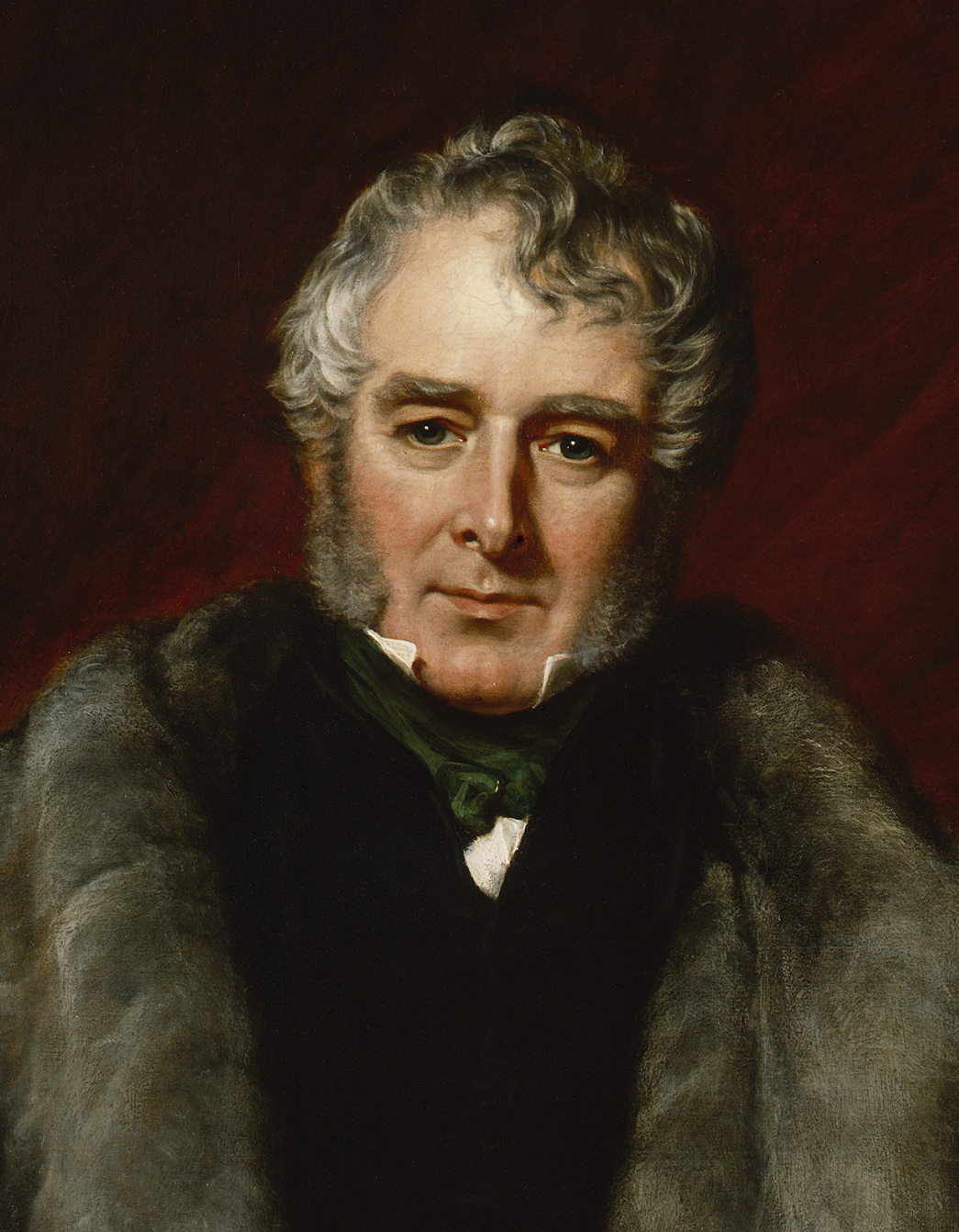
Lord Melbourne

- Archibald Campbell, 3rd Duke of Argyll, dominant political leader in Scotland in the 18th century
- John Crowley, Irish Sinn Féin politician and medical practitioner
- James Douglas, 2nd Duke of Queensberry, last Lord High Commissioner before the Act of Union
- James Allison Glen, Canadian parliamentarian and Speaker of the Canadian House of Commons
- William Lamb, 2nd Viscount Melbourne, Queen Victoria's first Prime Minister
- John Maclean, leading figure of the Red Clydeside era
- James Maitland, 8th Earl of Lauderdale, keeper of the Great Seal of Scotland and a representative peer for Scotland in the House of Lords
- James Maxton, leader of the Independent Labour Party

=== Conservative Party ===
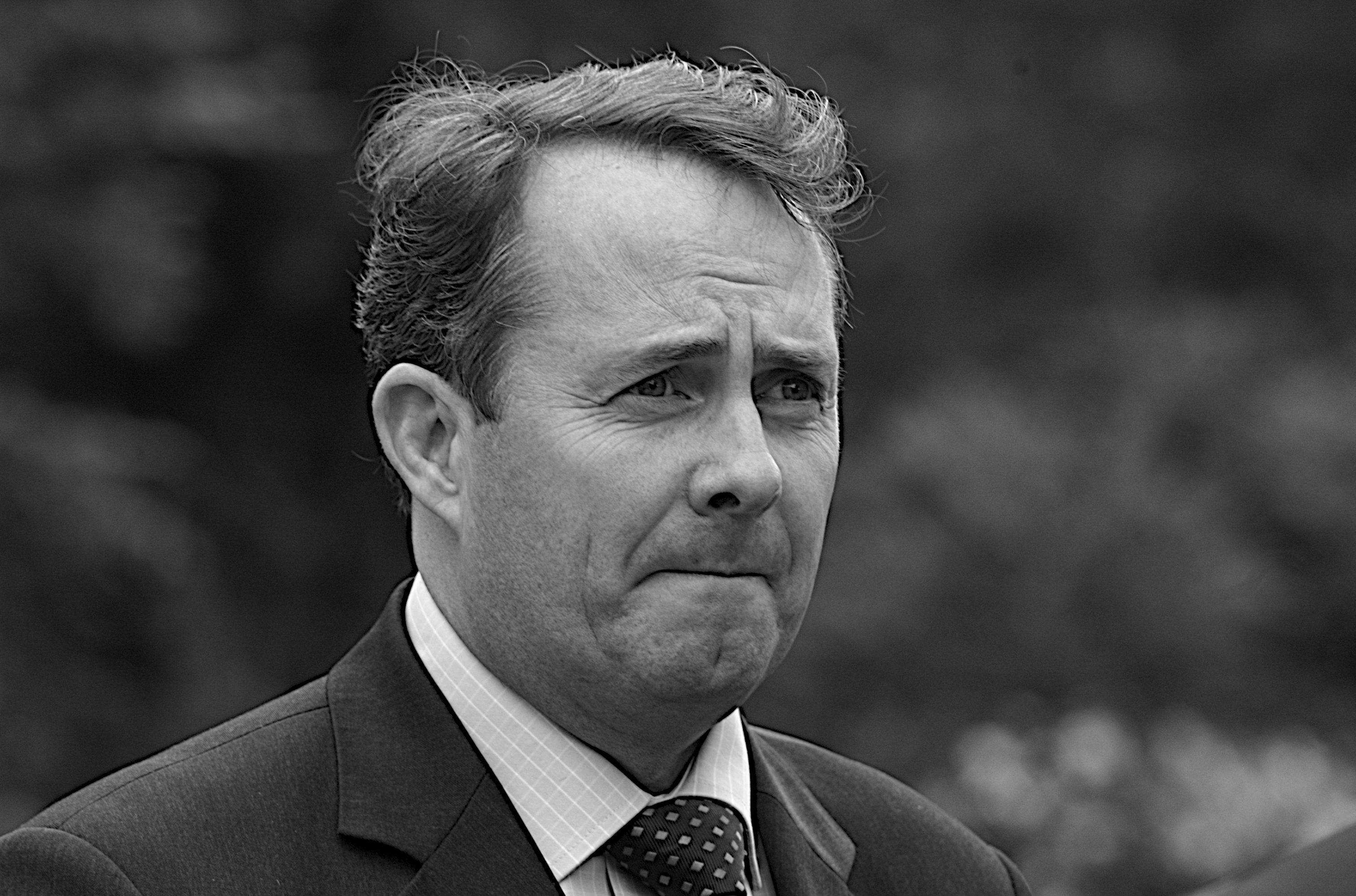
Liam Fox

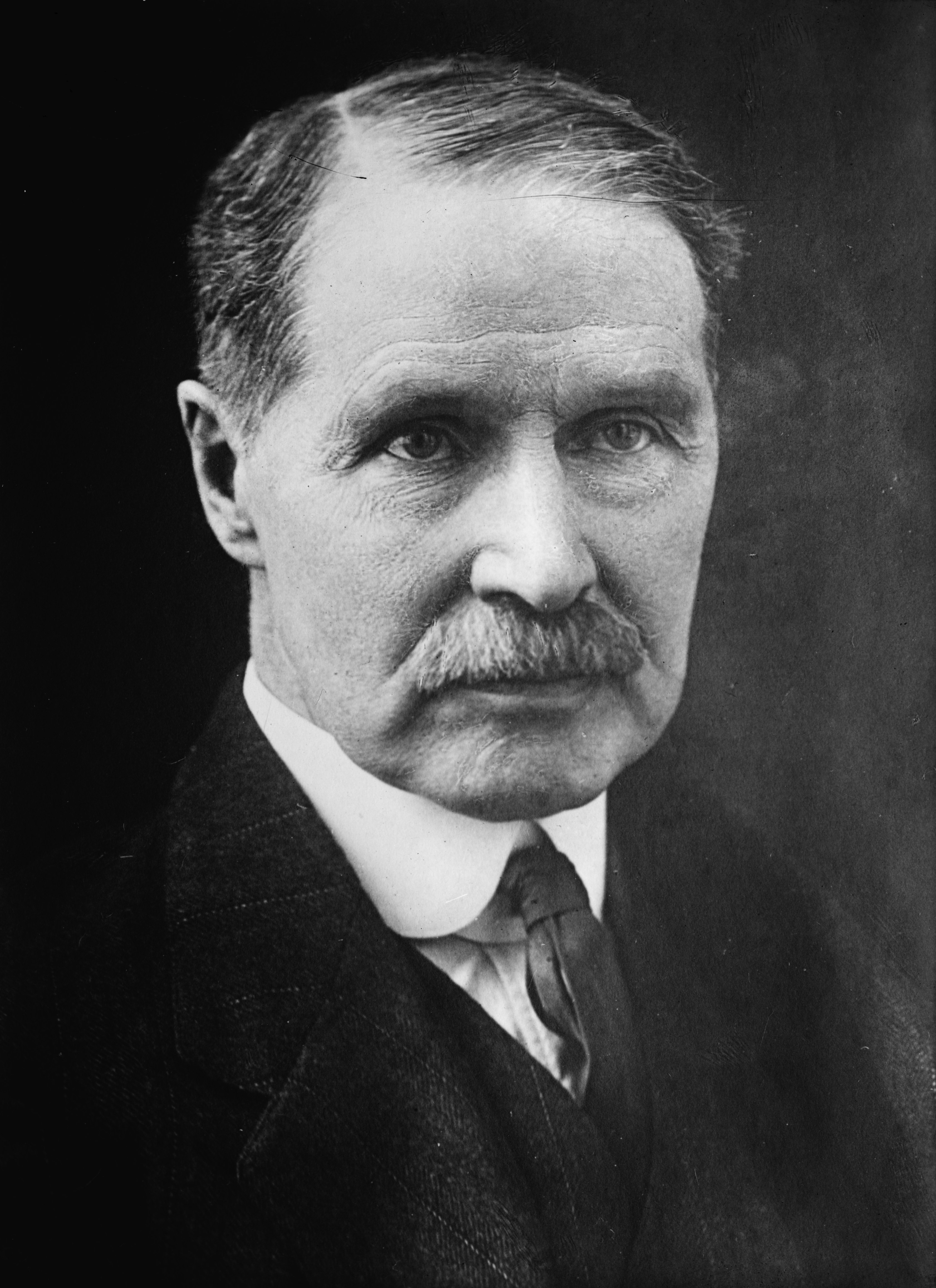
Bonar Law

- Eric Forth, MP
- Sir Liam Fox, MP
- Tam Galbraith, long-time MP for Glasgow Hillhead whose death in 1982 led to the historic election of Roy Jenkins and formation of the new Social Democratic Party (UK)
- James Gray, MP
- John Lamont, MP for Berwickshire, Roxburgh and Selkirk
- Bonar Law, Conservative Prime Minister
- Mark Menzies, MP
- Sir David Robertson, MP
- Sir Teddy Taylor, MP

=== Labour Party ===
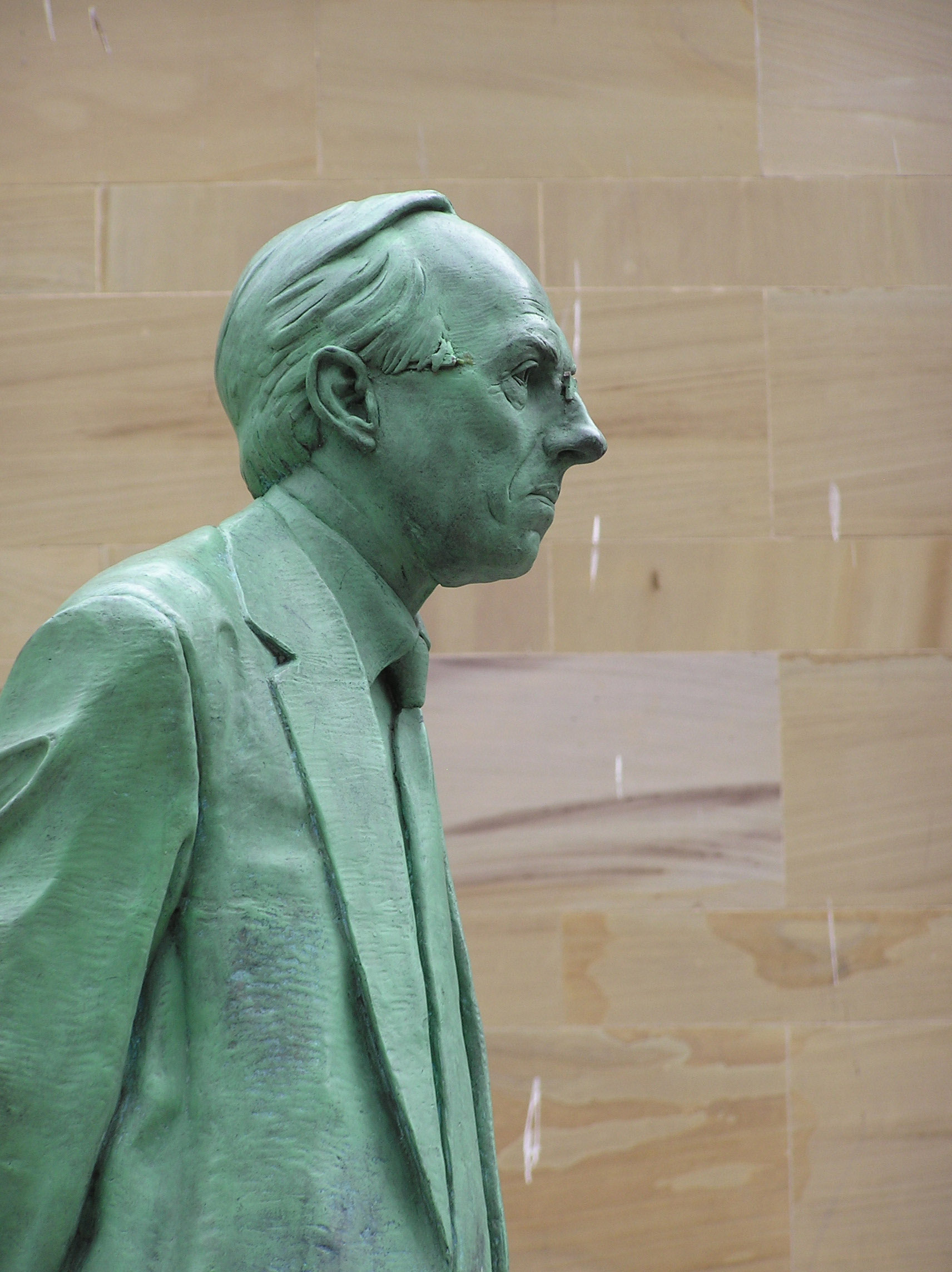
Donald Dewar

- Wendy Alexander, MSP
- John Baird, MP for Wolverhampton 1945-64
- Sarah Boyack, MSP
- Des Browne KC, Secretary of State for Defence
- Margaret Curran, MSP
- Donald Dewar, former First Minister of Scotland
- Andrew Faulds, MP
- Sam Galbraith, former minister (UK government)
- Jim Gallagher, Head of Justice Department for the Scottish Executive
- Derry Irvine, Baron Irvine of Lairg KC, former Lord Chancellor
- Tom Johnston, Secretary of State for Scotland
- Johann Lamont, MSP
- Anne McGuire, MP
- Hector McNeil, Secretary of State for Scotland
- Bridget Prentice, MP
- Gordon Prentice, MP
- Willie Ross, Baron Ross of Marnock, Secretary of State for Scotland
- Michael Shanks, MP
- John Smith, former Labour party leader and UK Cabinet Minister
- Paul Sweeney, MSP
- John Wheatley, Lord Wheatley; politician, lawyer and Judge of the Court of Session
- Tony Worthington, MP

=== Liberal Party/Liberal Democrats ===
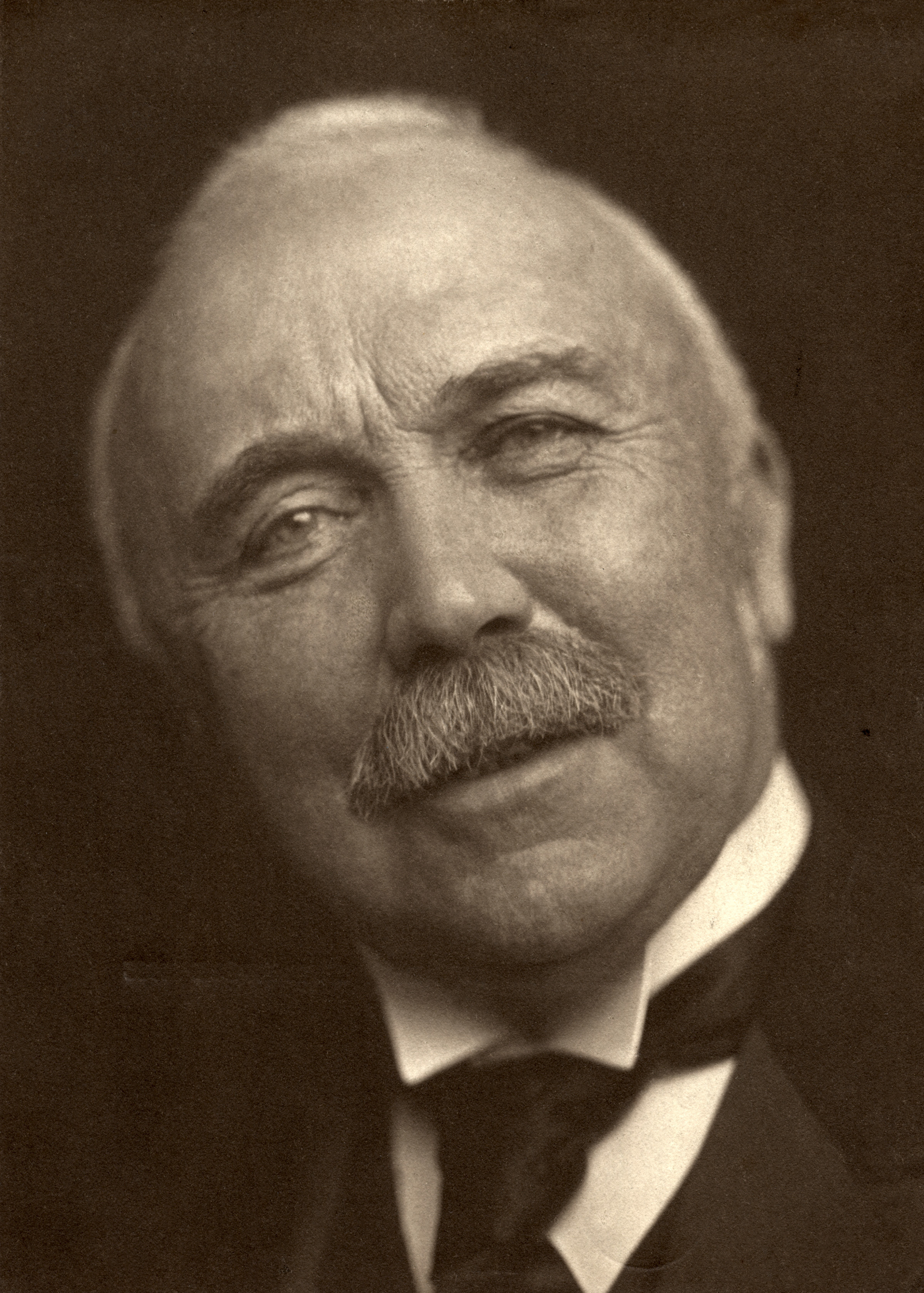
Henry Campbell-Bannerman

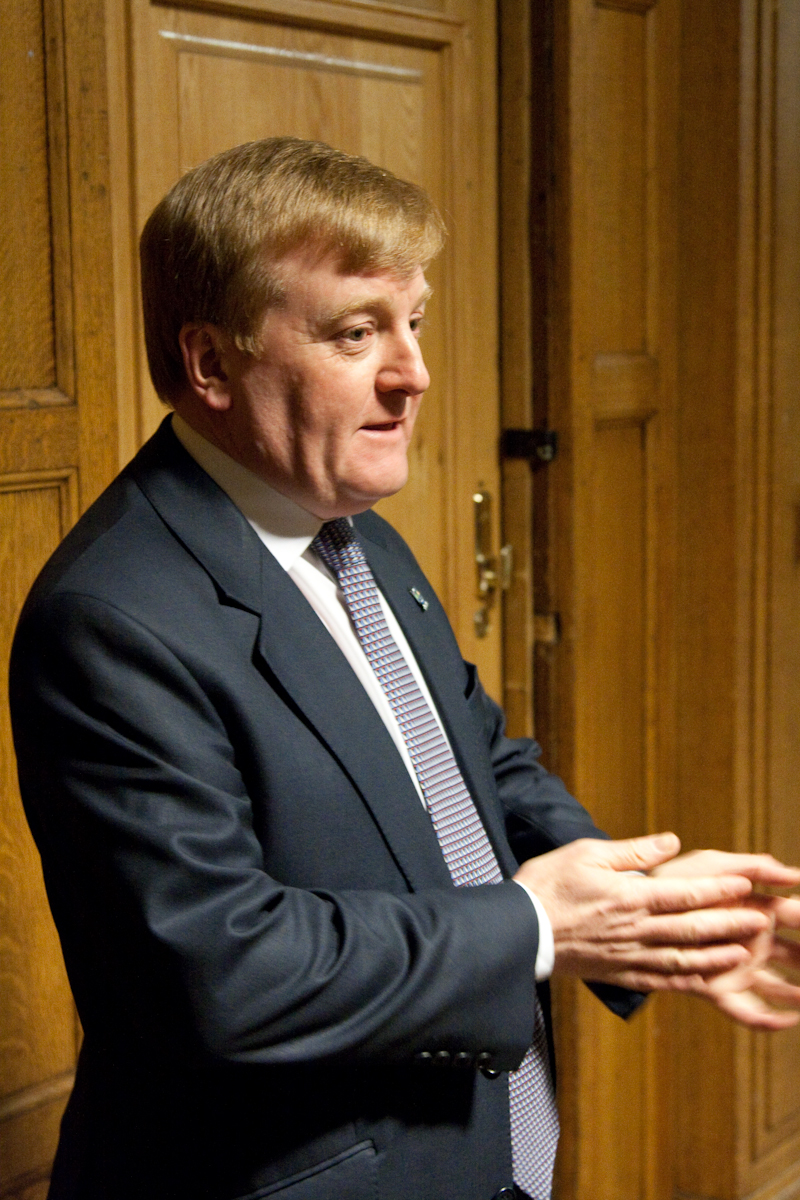
Charles Kennedy

- Elspeth Attwooll, former MEP for the Liberal Democrats
- John Bannerman, Baron Bannerman of Kildonan
- James Bryce, 1st Viscount Bryce, Regius Professor of Civil Law at Oxford, Liberal politician, British ambassador to the US in 1907-13
- Sir Vince Cable, former leader of the Liberal Democrats
- Sir Menzies Campbell, former leader of the Liberal Democrats
- Sir Henry Campbell-Bannerman, Liberal Party Prime Minister
- Alistair Carmichael, MP for Orkney and Shetland
- Charles Kennedy, former leader of the Liberal Democrats
- Alan Reid, former Liberal Democrat Member of Parliament for Argyll and Bute
- Sir William Sutherland, Chancellor of the Duchy of Lancaster, 1922

=== Scottish National Party ===
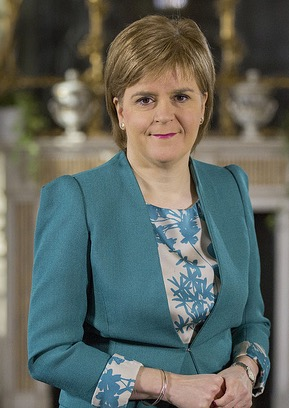
Nicola Sturgeon

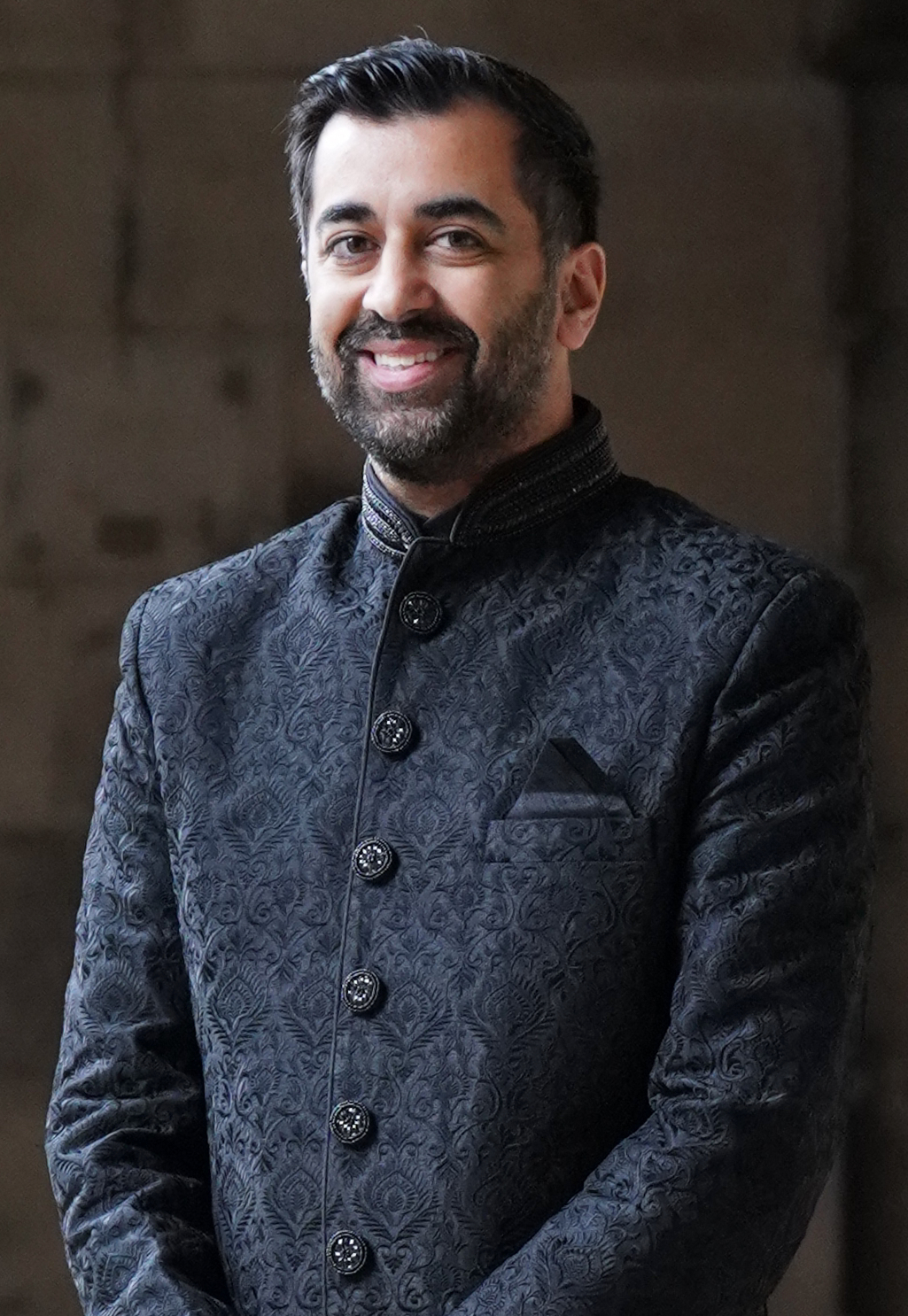
Humza Yousaf

- Alasdair Allan, MSP for Na h-Eileanan an Iar
- Marco Biagi, MSP for Edinburgh Central
- Mhairi Black, MP for Paisley and Renfrewshire South
- Aileen Campbell, MSP, youngest MSP in the 2007–2011 Session
- Angela Constance, MSP
- Annabelle Ewing, former MP
- Fergus Ewing, MSP
- Margaret Ewing, MSP, former MP
- Winnie Ewing, former SNP President, former MP, MSP and MEP
- Linda Fabiani, MSP Minister for Europe, External Affairs and Culture
- Ian Hamilton, repatriator of the Stone of Destiny and King's Counsel
- Jamie Hepburn, MSP
- Fiona Hyslop, Cabinet Secretary for Culture, Tourism and External Affairs
- John MacCormick, founder of the National Party of Scotland
- Neil MacCormick, MEP
- Derek Mackay, MSP (did not graduate)
- Jim Mather, MSP Minister for Enterprise, Energy and Tourism
- Alasdair Morgan, MSP Deputy Presiding Officer
- Kirsten Oswald, Member of Parliament
- Shona Robison, MSP
- Nicola Sturgeon, former First Minister of Scotland, SNP Leader, MSP
- Andrew Welsh, MSP, former MP
- Humza Yousaf, First Minister of Scotland, SNP Leader, MSP

=== Scottish Unionist Party ===
- Walter Elliot, former Scottish Secretary
- Robert Horne, 1st Viscount Horne of Slamannan, Chancellor of the Exchequer
- Albert Russell, Scottish Unionist Party member and MP

=== Miscellaneous ===
- Charles Allan Cathcart, former MP and British Ambassador to China
- William Steel Dickson, radical Ulster Presbyterian and Irish republican revolutionary, member of the United Irishmen
- Regina Ip, first woman to be appointed as Secretary for Security of Hong Kong
- Nasharudin Mat Isa, Member of the Parliament of Malaysia; Deputy President of the opposition PAS
- Yanis Varoufakis, Greek Minister of Finance from January to July 2015

== Sciences ==
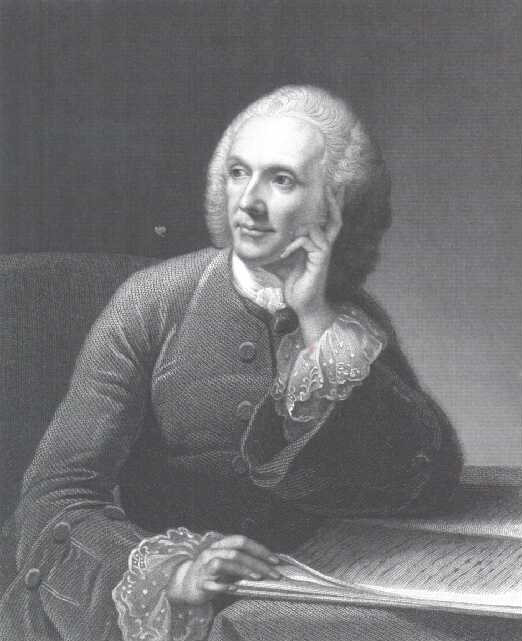
William Hunter

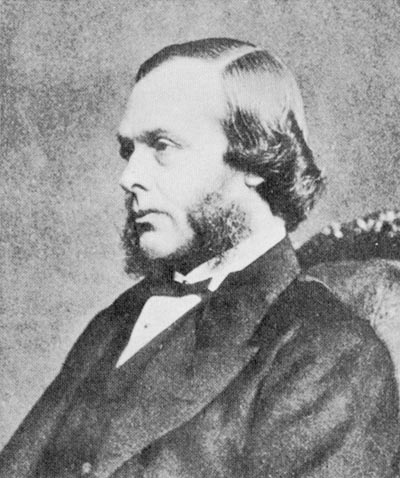
Joseph Lister

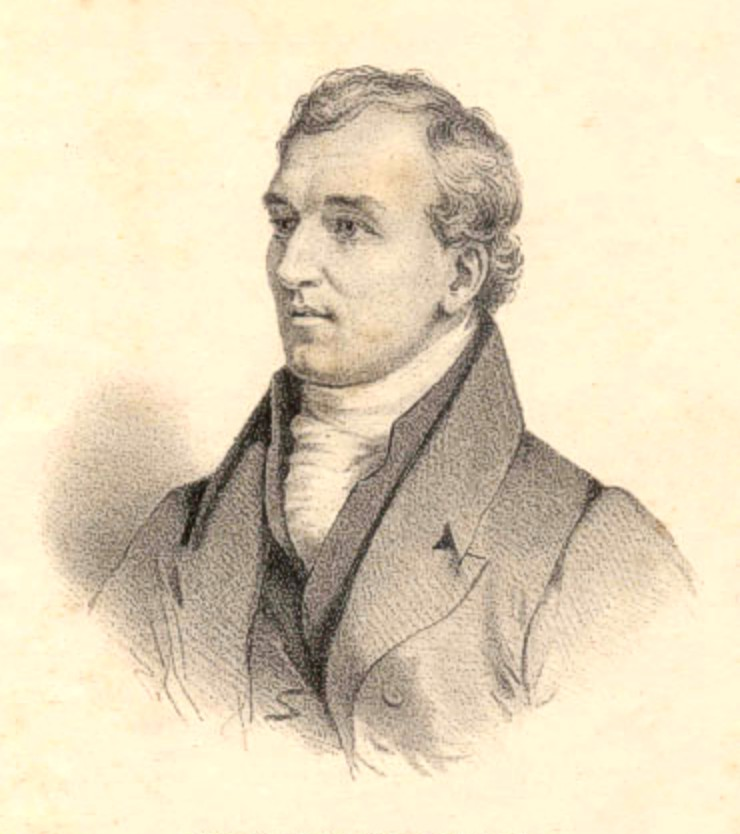
David Douglas

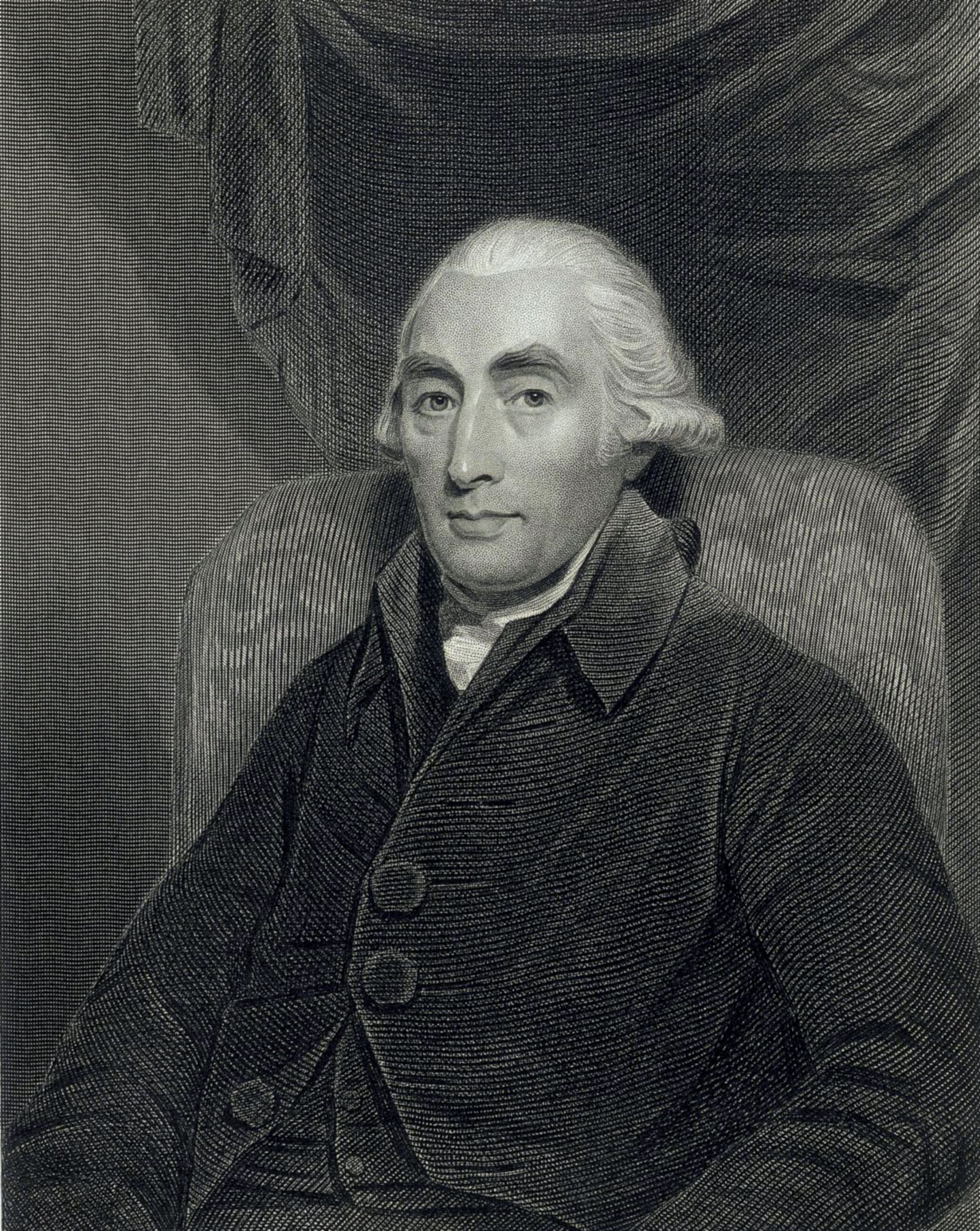
Joseph Black

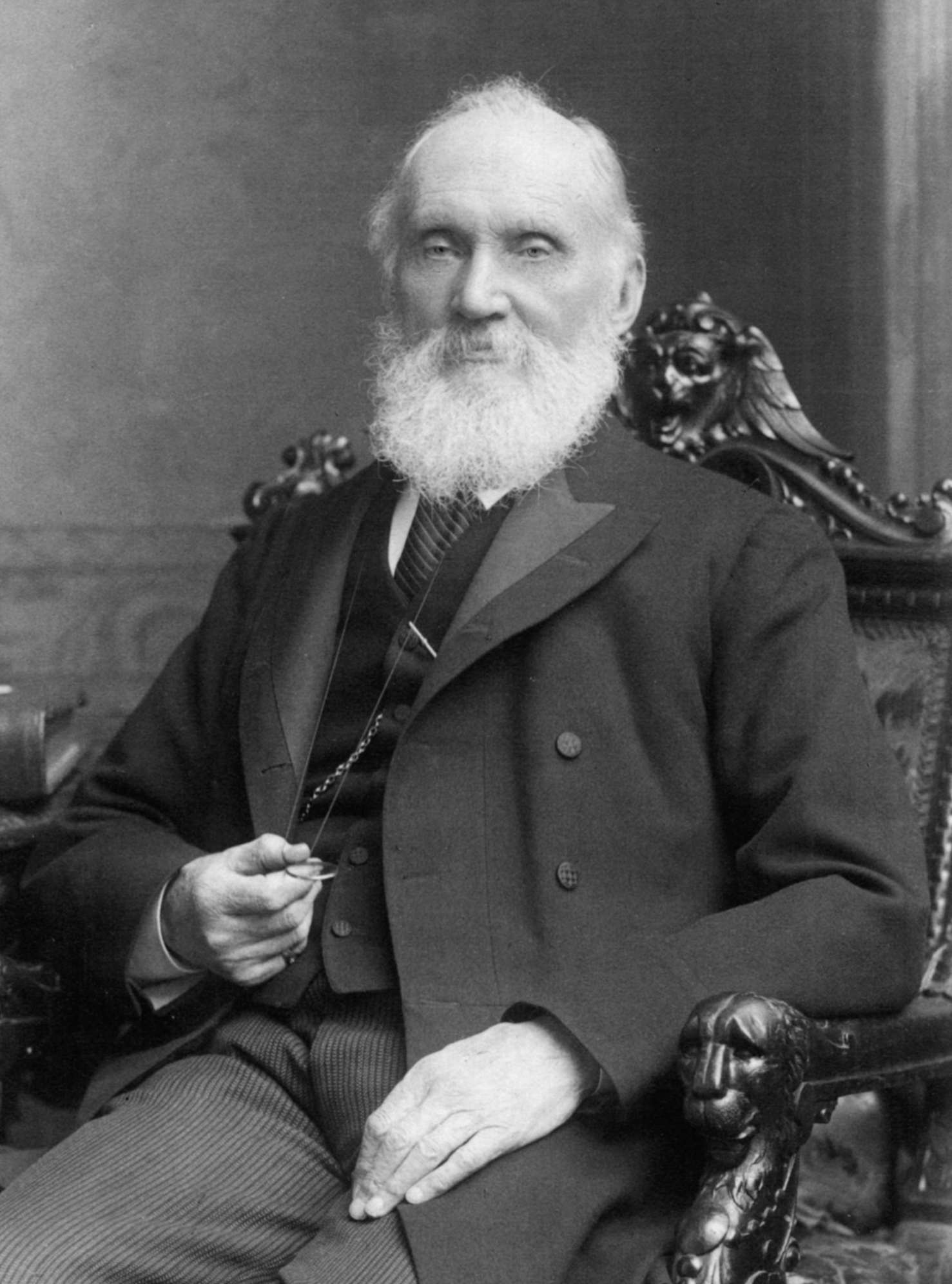
Lord Kelvin

=== Medical ===
- Gavin Arneil, paediatric nephrologist
- John Bell, 18th-century adviser to the Tsar and author of a travelogue from St. Petersburg to Beijing
- Sir Gilbert Blane, Scottish physician who instituted health reform in the Royal Navy
- Robert Broom, physician
- Sir Harry Burns, Chief Medical Officer for Scotland
- Sir Kenneth Calman, Scottish cancer researcher, former Chief Medical Officer, current Chancellor of the University of Glasgow
- Murdoch Cameron, Regius Professor of Midwifery; performed first modern Caesarian section in 1888; father of Samuel James Cameron
- Samuel James Cameron, Regius Professor of Midwifery; son of Murdoch Cameron; collector of Scottish art
- Stuart Campbell, obstetrician and gynaecologist
- Edward Provan Cathcart, Regius Professor of Physiology at the University of Glasgow
- Alistair Cochran, immunologist and pathologist
- William Cullen, physician, chemist, agriculturalist, professor at Edinburgh Medical School
- Ian Donald, pioneer of diagnostic and obstetric medical ultrasound
- Hani Gabra, professor of Oncology at Imperial College London
- Ian Hart, neurologist
- John Hunter, surgeon
- William Hunter, anatomist and physician
- James Jameson, surgeon general, Army Medical Service
- Bryan J. Jennett, with Sir Graham Teasdale, co-inventor of the Glasgow Coma Scale
- R. D. Laing, psychiatrist
- Sir Alan Langlands, former chief executive of the NHS, vice-chancellor of the University of Leeds
- William Boog Leishman, pathologist credited with first successful anti-typhoid inoculation
- Joseph Lister, surgeon
- David Livingstone, "Dr. Livingstone," 19th century medical missionary to Africa (did not graduate)
- Donald MacAlister, also Principal of the University of Glasgow, 1907–29
- Sir William Macewen, pioneer of neurosurgery
- Elizabeth Janet MacGregor, medical doctor and cancer researcher
- Donald James MacKintosh, Scottish physician, soldier and public health expert
- Dame Louise McIlroy, obstetrics and gynaecology consultant; first woman to receive M.D. from the university
- Quintin McKellar, veterinary surgeon and vice-chancellor of the University of Hertfordshire
- Anderson Gray McKendrick, epidemiologist
- Maud Perry Menzies, community health physician; RAMC captain during World War II
- John Moore, Scottish physician and travel author
- Janet Niven, histologist and pathologist
- Priscilla Nzimiro, physician
- Delphine Parrott, endocrinologist and immunologist, Gardiner Professor of Immunology 1980-1990
- Mujibur Rahman, medical scientist, recipient of Ekushey Padak
- Kathleen Rutherford, physician, philanthropist, humanitarian aid worker and peace campaigner.
- David Shannon, physician, academic, World War I medical officer, foundation fellow of the Royal College of Obstetricians and Gynaecologists
- James McCune Smith, first university trained African-American physician; abolitionist and public intellectual in New York
- Alexander Stewart-Wilson, foundation fellow of the Royal College of Obstetricians and Gynaecologists
- John Hammond Teacher, pathologist, researcher and medical academic
- Sir Graham Teasdale, with Bryan J. Jennett, co-inventor of the Glasgow Coma Scale
- Thomas Thomson, Scottish surgeon with the British East India Company
- Robert Thomson, a pioneer of sanitation
- Merbai Ardesir Vakil, physician, first Asian woman to graduate from a Scottish university

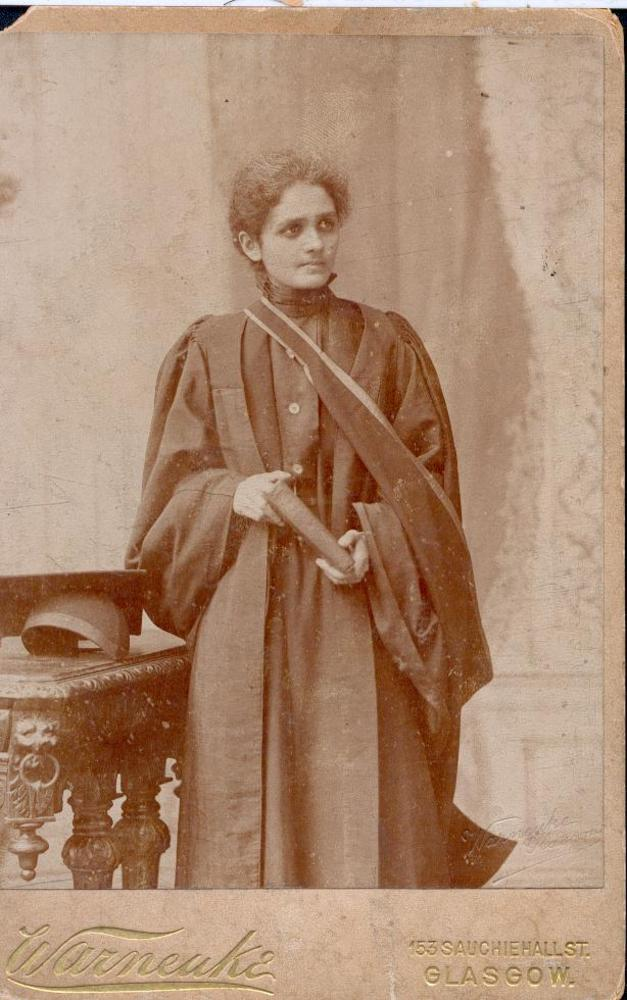
Merbai Ardesir Vakil

=== Biology ===
- Sir John Arbuthnott, Scottish microbiologist, and Principal of the University of Strathclyde (1991-2000)
- Isaac Bayley Balfour, Regius Professor of Botany and Sherardian Professor of Botany Oxford
- John Hutton Balfour, Professor of Botany; Regius Keeper of the Royal Botanic Garden Edinburgh and Her Majesty's Botanist
- Percy Wragg Brian, Regius Professor of Botany
- David Campbell, Professor of Materia Medica at Aberdeen University 1930–1959; won the Military Cross in 1918 due to his bravery serving in the Royal Army Medical Corps
- David Douglas, botanist
- Heather M. Ferguson, Professor Professor of Medical Entomology and Disease Ecology, co-chairs the WHO Vector Control Advisory Group on malaria
- Anne Ferguson-Smith, Arthur Balfour Professor of Genetics
- Malcolm Ferguson-Smith, one of the first geneticists to provide a diagnostic and counselling service to patients with genetic conditions
- Alan Gemmell, Professor of Biology, Keele University 1950–77
- Sir William Jackson Hooker, Regius Professor of Botany and Director of the Royal Botanic Gardens, Kew
- John Hope, Scottish physician and botanist; early supporter of Carl Linnaeus's system of classification
- Thomas Hopkirk, botanist and lithographer
- Robert Thomson Leiper, parasitologist and helminthologist
- Sheina Marshall, marine biologist
- Guido Pontecorvo, the university's first Professor of Genetics
- Muriel Robertson, protozoologist and bacteriologist at the Lister Institute

=== Chemistry ===
- Thomas Andrews, chemist and physicist, received the Royal Medal in 1844 for his work on the heat developed in chemical actions
- Joseph Black, physicist and chemist
- Leroy (Lee) Cronin, chemist
- Thomas Graham, chemist
- George William Gray, chemist, pioneer of stable liquid crystals, awarded Kyoto Prize and Leverhulme Medal
- Thomas Charles Hope, proved the existence of the element strontium, and gave his name to Hope's experiment
- Jōkichi Takamine, chemist
- Thomas Thomson, Regius Professor of Chemistry, gave silicon its name
- Alexander Todd, Baron Todd, chemist

=== Mathematics, physical sciences and engineering ===
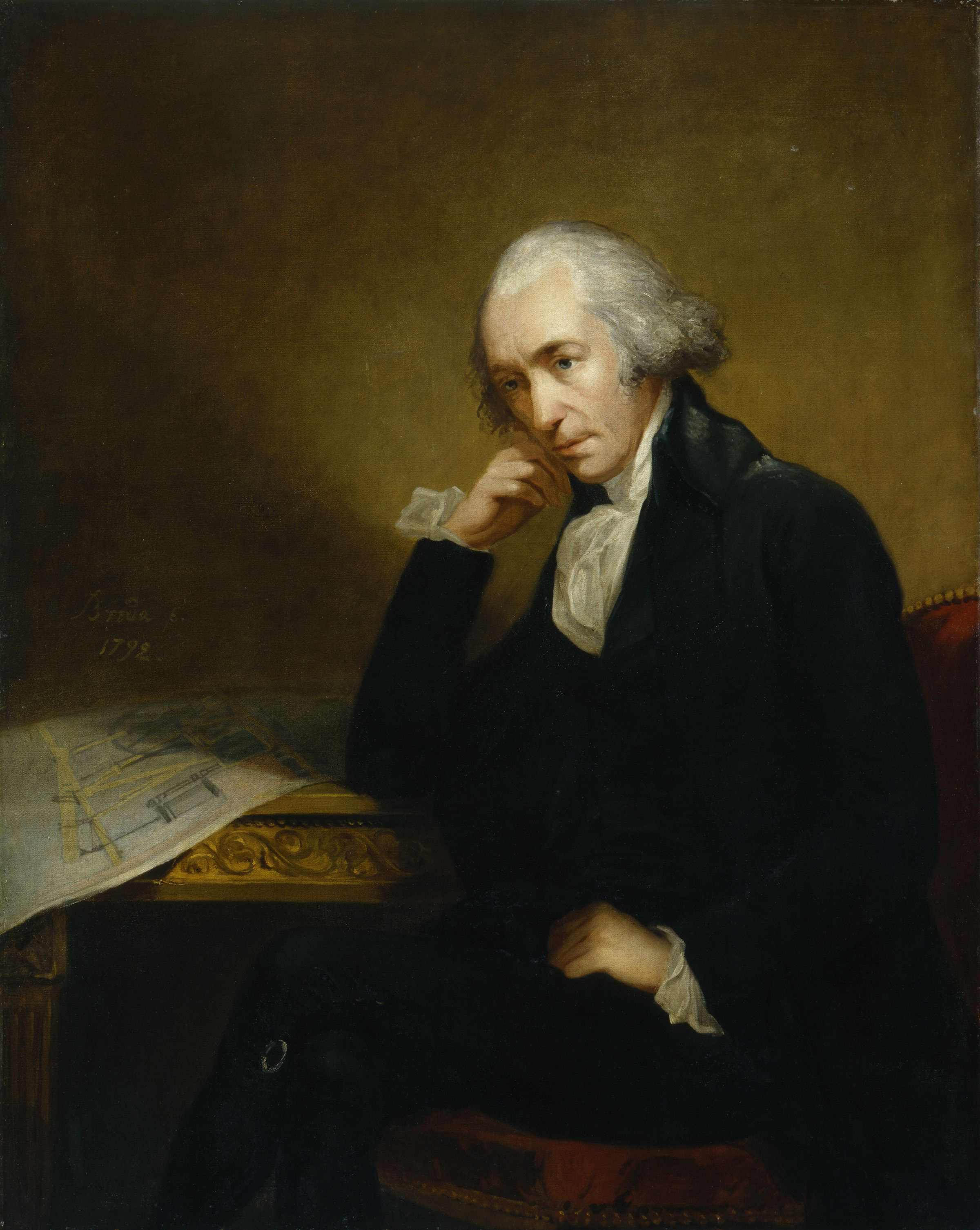
James Watt

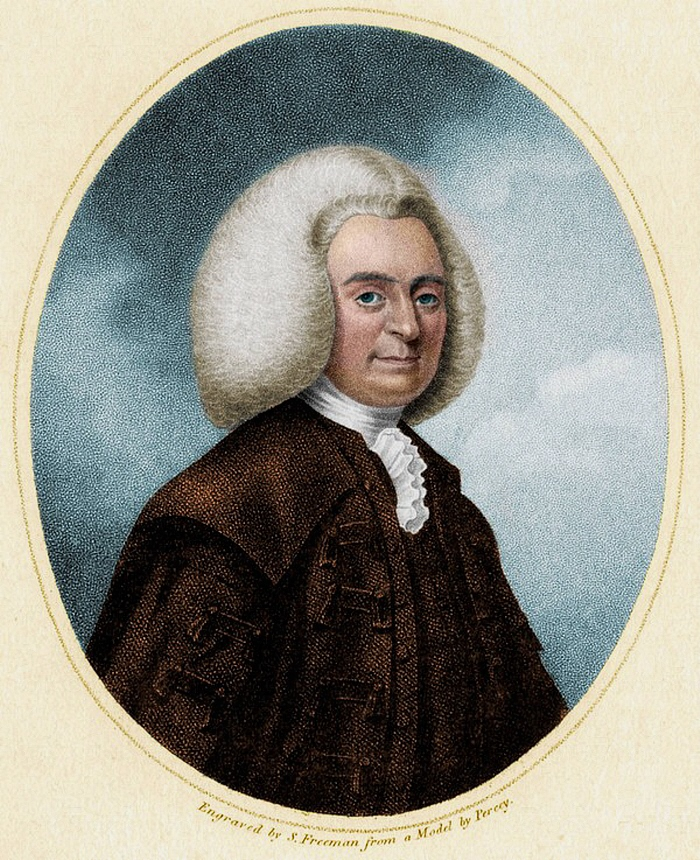
Colin Maclaurin

- John Anderson, natural philosopher and founder of the Anderson's Institution in 1796 (predecessor to the University of Strathclyde)
- John Logie Baird, inventor of television
- Frank Barnwell, aeronautical engineer and pilot of first powered flight in Scotland in 1909
- Bruce C. Berndt, mathematician
- Hugh Blackburn, member of the Cambridge Apostles, inventor of the Blackburn pendulum
- John Brown, Astronomer Royal for Scotland
- A. Catrina Bryce, physicist, electrical engineer
- Jocelyn Bell Burnell, astrophysicist
- Ethel Currie, geologist
- Henry Dyer, engineer
- William Gemmell Cochran, statistician
- Bernard Parker Haigh, engineer
- Sam Karunaratne, electrical engineer and Sri Lankan academic
- John Kerr, physicist
- Colin Maclaurin, mathematician
- Ken McCallum, mathematics undergraduate degree, head of MI5
- Elizabeth McHarg, mathematician
- Bill Napier, astronomer and novelist
- Raymond Ogden, engineering mathematician
- Percy Sinclair Pilcher, pioneer of powered flight
- Robert Alexander Rankin, mathematician
- William John Macquorn Rankine, engineer and physicist
- John Robison, physicist and mathematician, inventor of the siren
- Dorothy Rowntree, first woman graduate in engineering from the university and first woman graduate in naval architecture in UK
- John Scott Russell, naval engineer
- Robert Simson, mathematician
- Ian Sneddon, mathematician
- William Thomson, 1st Baron Kelvin, mathematical physicist
- Gavin Vernon, engineer, known for removing the Stone of Scone from Westminster Abbey
- James Watt, mathematician and engineer
- Werner S. Weiglhofer, mathematician and engineer
- Gillian Wright, astronomer and director of the UK Astronomy Technology Centre

=== Computing ===
- Simon Peyton Jones, research in functional programming languages
- Philip Wadler, research in functional programming languages

== Social sciences ==
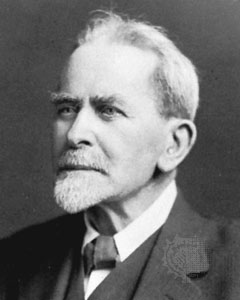
Sir James Frazer

- Sally Baldwin, social policy researcher
- Sir Alexander Cairncross, economist and Chancellor of the University of Glasgow (1972–96),
- Sir James Frazer, social anthropologist
- Donald Kaberuka, president of the African Development Bank
- Sir Anton Muscatelli, economist and University Vice-Chancellor
- Alexander Nove, Soviet economic historian
- Alison Phipps, refugee researcher, UNESCO chair in Refugee Integration through Languages and the Arts
- Ljubo Sirc, economist, author and Slovenian dissident during the Titoist regime

== Sports ==
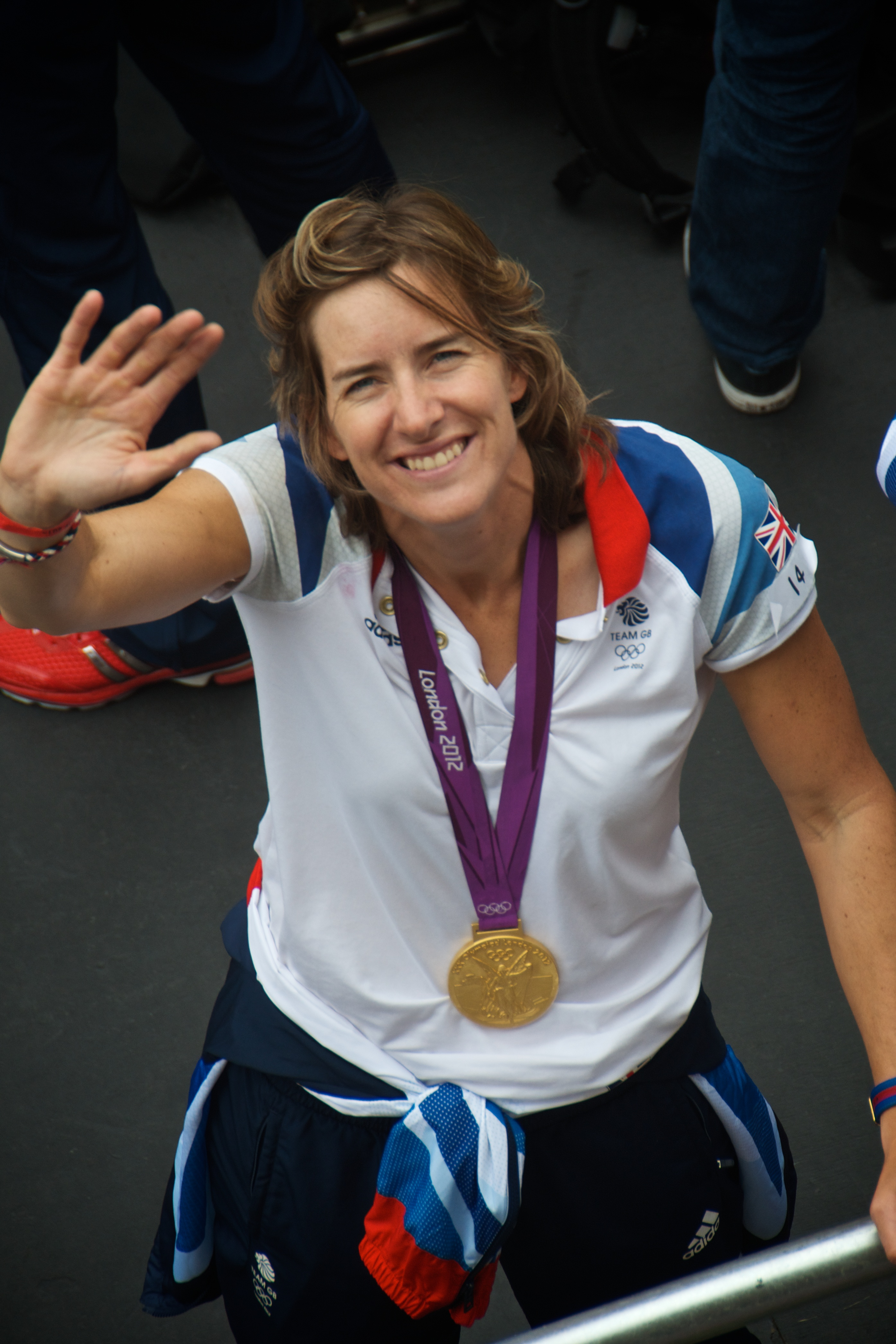
Katherine Grainger

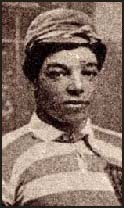
Andrew Watson

- John Beattie, rugby union international player
- Jim Craig, Celtic F.C. player, member of the Lisbon Lions
- Katherine Grainger, rower and Great Britain's most decorated female Olympian
- Louis Greig, rugby union player and naval surgeon
- RC Hamilton, Rangers F.C. player
- Thomas Hart, cricket and rugby union player
- Dave MacLeod, Scottish rock climber
- Laura Muir, British record holder over 1500m and Olympic silver medalist
- Euan Murray, rugby union player for British and Irish Lions
- James Reid-Kerr, rugby union and cricket international player
- Emma Richards, yachtswoman, became the first British woman and youngest ever person to complete the single-handed round the world yacht race with stops
- David Robertson, golfer, won bronze at the 1900 Olympic Games
- Arthur Smith, rugby union player, captained Scotland and the British and Irish Lions
- Imogen Walsh, rower, 2011 lightweight women's quad World Champion
- Andrew Watson, early Scotland international footballer and first black international player in the history of the game
- Leslie Watson, early Scottish long-distance runner

== See also ==
- University of Glasgow Memorial Gates
- List of Professorships at the University of Glasgow
