= Ian Hart (disambiguation) =

Ian Hart (born 1964) is an English actor.

Ian Hart may also refer to:

- Ian Hart (neurologist) (1958–2008) British lecturer and consultant
- Ian Hart, fictional TV character in The Last Train
- Ian Hart (distiller)

== See also ==
- Ian Harte, Irish footballer
