= Robin McKie =

English writer

Robin McKie is a writer known for his journalism in The Observer, a publication for which he has served as science editor. As a result of his work, he has won awards from organizations such as the Medical Journalists’ Association, reviving a citation in early 2014 for a feature on zebrafish research. He additionally got named as "Science and Technology Journalist of the Year" during the U.K. Press Gazette Awards for 2013.

In addition he has written numerous books with a view to expanding popular interest in and understanding of biological science.

The original findings detailing the cloning of Dolly the sheep by Ian Wilmut and his team at the Roslin Institute in Scotland were scheduled to be published in the scientific journal Nature on Thursday, February 27 1997. Nature had distributed a press release to journalists on the preceding Wednesday afternoon with an embargo on publication before the Nature publication. The embargo was broken on Sunday, February 23, 1997, when journalist Robin McKie published an exclusive front-page scoop in the British Sunday newspaper, The Observer.

== Background and personal life ==
McKie resides in London, England.

He is an alumnus of Glasgow University, having studied mathematics and psychology at the institution.

== See also ==
- List of University of Glasgow people
- Science journalism
