= Charles H. M. Kerr =

English painter

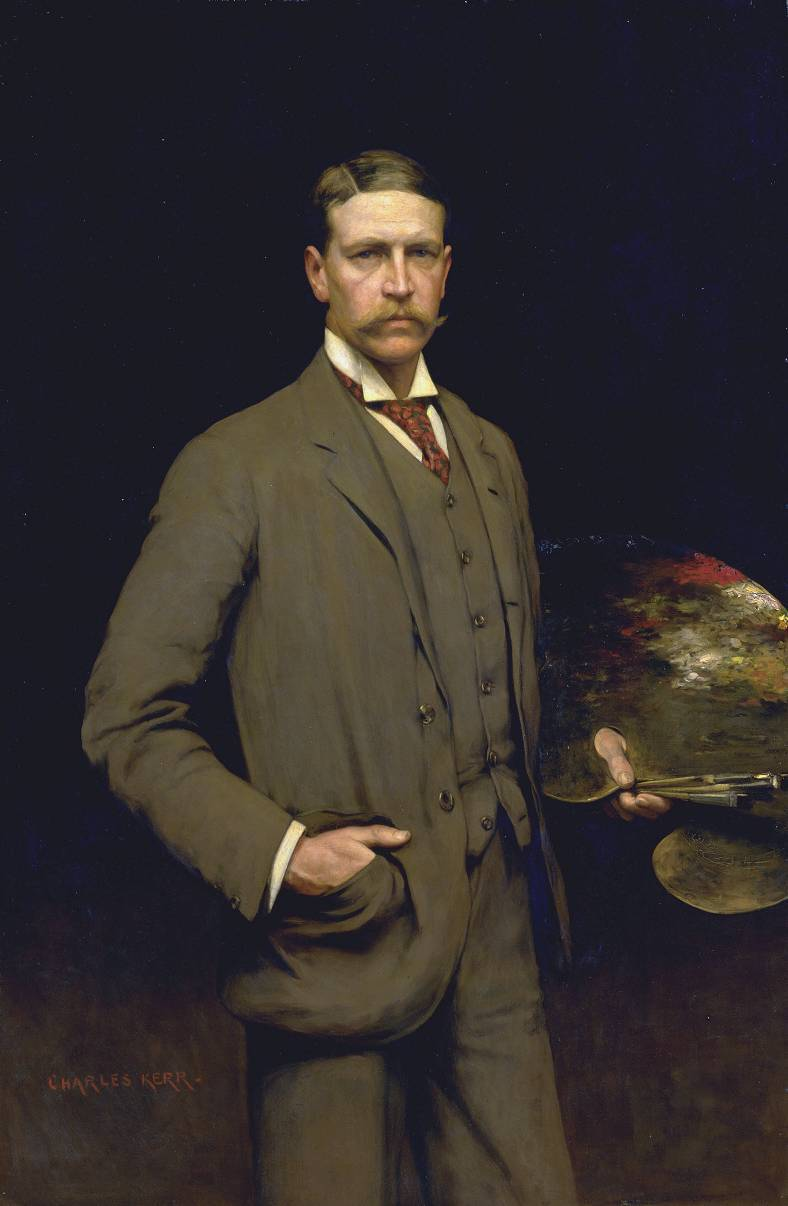
'Myself' by Charles H. M. Kerr (1899)

Charles Henry Malcolm Kerr RBA (22 January 1858 – 7 December 1907) (also known as C. H. M. Kerr or Charles Kerr) was a British portrait, genre, landscape painter and illustrator of the late Victorian era perhaps best known for his illustrations for the adventure novels of H. Rider Haggard.

== Career ==
Born in London, one of six sons and two daughters of Robert Malcolm Kerr (1821–1902), a Judge of the City of London Court, and Maria Susannah Soley Kerr, Charles Kerr was educated at Corpus Christi College, Oxford. On leaving Oxford he studied at the Royal Academy Schools and at the Académie Julian in Paris. He exhibited regularly at the Royal Academy from 1884, including 'Wargrave Church', 'The Oldest Inhabitant', 'An Academy Picture' and numerous portraits.

Kerr also exhibited at the Royal Institute of Oil Painters, Royal Institute of Painters in Water Colours, Royal Society of British Artists and New English Art Club, as well as at the Royal Hibernian Academy, Manchester City Art Gallery and the Walker Art Gallery in Liverpool. In 1890 he was elected a Member of the Royal Society of British Artists.

He provided illustrations for books by H. Rider Haggard (Allan Quatermain 1887; She: A History of Adventure 1888; Allan's Wife & Other Tales 1889; Nada the Lily 1892; The Witch's Head 1893; The Wizard 1896; Black Heart & White Heart & Other Stories 1900), Robert Louis Stevenson (The Wrong Box 1899), Andrew Lang (editor) (The True Story Book 1893) and Arthur Conan Doyle (the Sherlock Holmes story The Sign of the Four 1890).

Kerr was amongst those invited to a dinner on 1 May 1889 at the Criterion Restaurant to congratulate James Abbott McNeill Whistler on becoming an Honorary Member of the Royal Academy of Fine Arts in Munich. He married Gertrude Lizzie Giles (1864–1941), who posed for his 1905 painting 'The Visitor', now in the collection of the Tate. She presented a number of his pictures to public collections throughout Great Britain from Hastings, Salford and Leeds.

== Addiction and decline ==
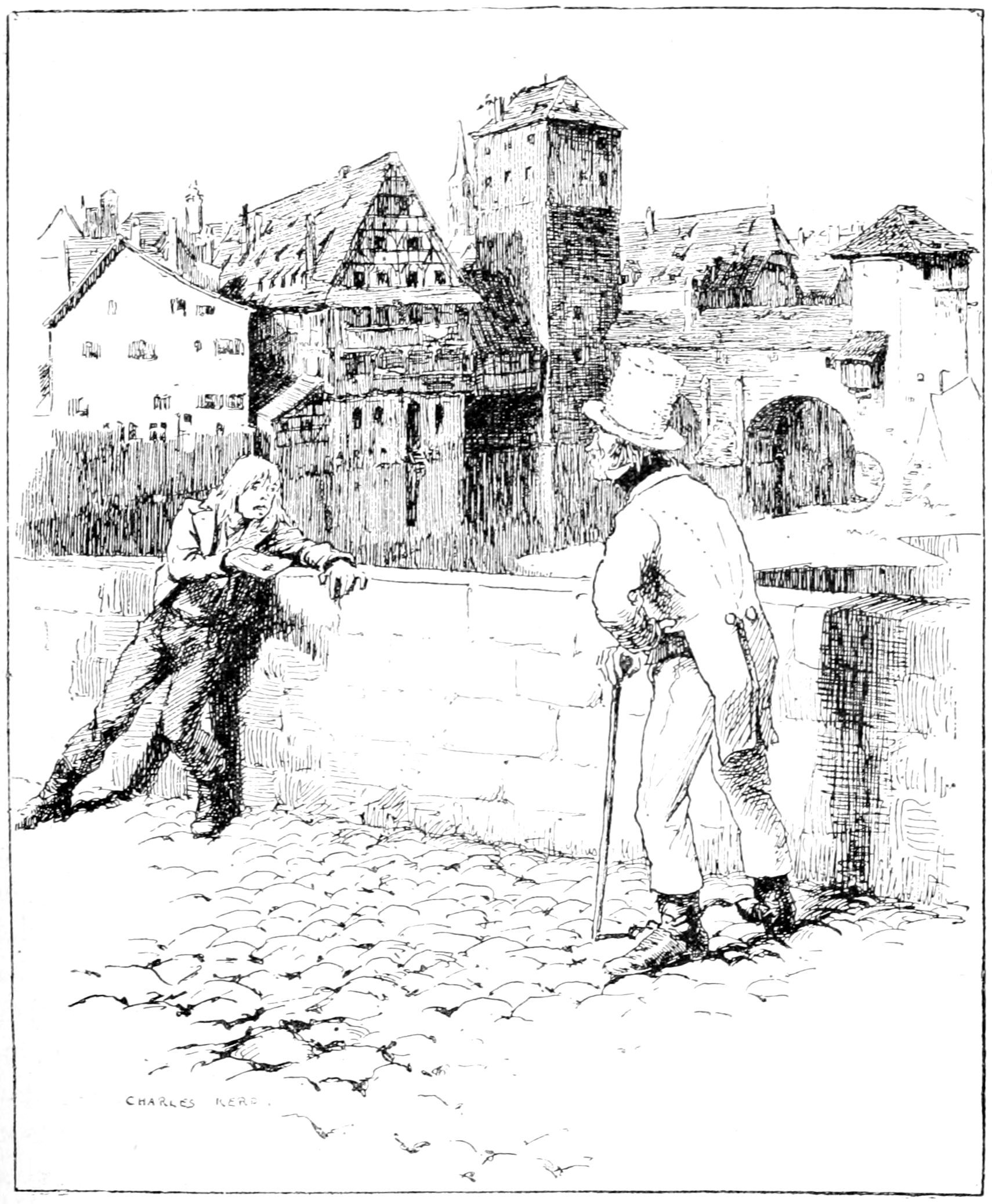
Kerr's illustration for a story on Kaspar Hauser, 1893

In 1906 Kerr was admitted to the Priory, a private clinic, and then to the Manor House asylum, a private mental hospital located in Chiswick in south-west London; at this time he was addicted to morphine.

On his admission his doctor wrote of him:

'He is described as being normally rather reserved, and has done some good work painting, his portraits having been accepted by the Academy…. Broke down last spring and became irritable & excitable. Taken by Dr Lord to his "home" at Hampstead, then began to smash things, & threaten, and evidently in a condition of absolute insane excitement, was certified & sent to the Priory.'

Notes written by Kerr and found in his file at Chiswick give an indication of his mental condition at this time:

'Dear Dr Tuke,
I wish I c[oul]d have some more brandy: it is like being in prison to be deprived like this of ordinary necessities.
C.K.
Also if you c[oul]d lend me a hypodermic syringe I s[houl]d be very much obliged.'

'Dear Dr Tuke
Last night, the morphia bottle was not found in my room: so Mr [illegible] refused to give me a dose at all: this, I regard as the most monstrous piece of insolence in a paid [illegible] I have ever heard of: but not by any means the only bit of impertinence I have been subject to. The morphia you have given me has had no effect at all. Mr Savage said definitely that I was to have it in doses strong enough to have some effect. I have told you over and over again that I have to take morphia in larger doses than people who are not accustomed to it: but you never attend to anything I say.
C.K.'

'Sir
For heaven's sake send me some brandy or something, I never felt so ill in my life. If I had been at my own home I c[oul]d have put myself right hours ago.
C.K'

On 8 September 1906 Kerr left the Manor House in his wife's care, noted in the records as "Discharged 'Relieved'". He died at his home in Burgess Hill just over a year later in December 1907 aged 49.
