= The Witch's Head =

1885 novel by H. Rider Haggard

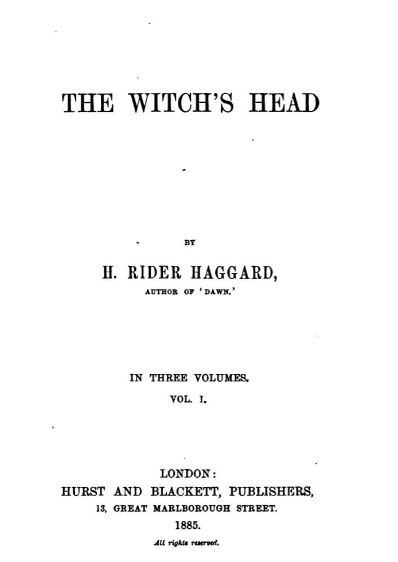
- Title page for The Witch's Head (1885)
- Author: H. Rider Haggard
- Language: English
- Genre: Adventure novel
- Publisher: Hurst and Blackett
- Publication date: 1885
- Publication place: United Kingdom
- Text: The Witch's Head at Wikisource

The Witch's Head is the second novel by H. Rider Haggard, which he wrote just prior to King Solomon's Mines.

== Background ==
Haggard wrote the novel following his debut effort Dawn. He was unable to find any magazine that would serialise the story, but it was accepted for publication by the firm that had put out Dawn. Haggard later wrote that "although, except for the African part, it is not in my opinion so good a story as Dawn, it was extremely well received and within certain limits very successful." The 1893 edition was illustrated by Charles H. M. Kerr.

== Reception ==
The book was a minor success, earning Haggard a profit of fifty pounds.

Haggard later named his daughter Dorothy after the heroine in the novel.

Mr. Haggard knows a good deal about Zululand, and rifle shooting, and of the wilder pleasures of the country, and he has contrived to make a lively story out of these and other materials.
