= Kung Lap-yan =

Chinese public theologian

Kung Lap-yan (Chinese: 龔立人) is a public theologian and associate professor at the Divinity School of Chung Chi College (DSCCC), Chinese University of Hong Kong.

== Biography ==
He received his Bachelor of Theology at Lutheran Theological Seminary, Hong Kong and spent a semester at Aarhus University, Denmark. He then finished Master of Philosophy at the University of St. Andrews and PhD at the University of Glasgow. His master thesis was on two Czech theologians, Josef L. Hromadka and Jan M. Lochman, and his doctoral thesis was on Stanley Hauerwas and Jon Sobrino. He was a pastor of the Evangelical Lutheran Church of Hong Kong before taking up a position at the Chinese University of Hong Kong.

He is the Dean of Institute for Advanced Study in Asian Cultures and Theologies (IASACT). He is Volunteer Director of Hong Kong Christian Institute (HKCI), a non-governmental organisation that promotes academic dialogue among both pastoral and lay leaders concerning social issues.

Apart from journal articles and books, he also writes broadly in Christian newspapers, such as the Christian Times and the HKCI journal Sze. He is the author of four award-winning books, namely, A Tearless Grief (2001), An Abnormal Faith (2008), The Cross of Homosexuality (2013), and God-Talk in Darkness (2018).
