= Robert Malcolm Kerr =

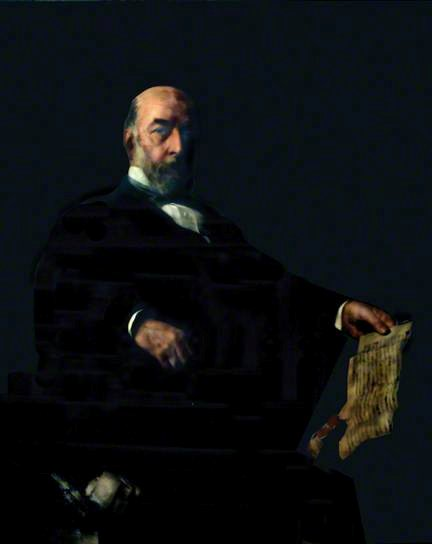
Robert Malcolm Kerr painted by his son, C.H.M. Kerr (1894)

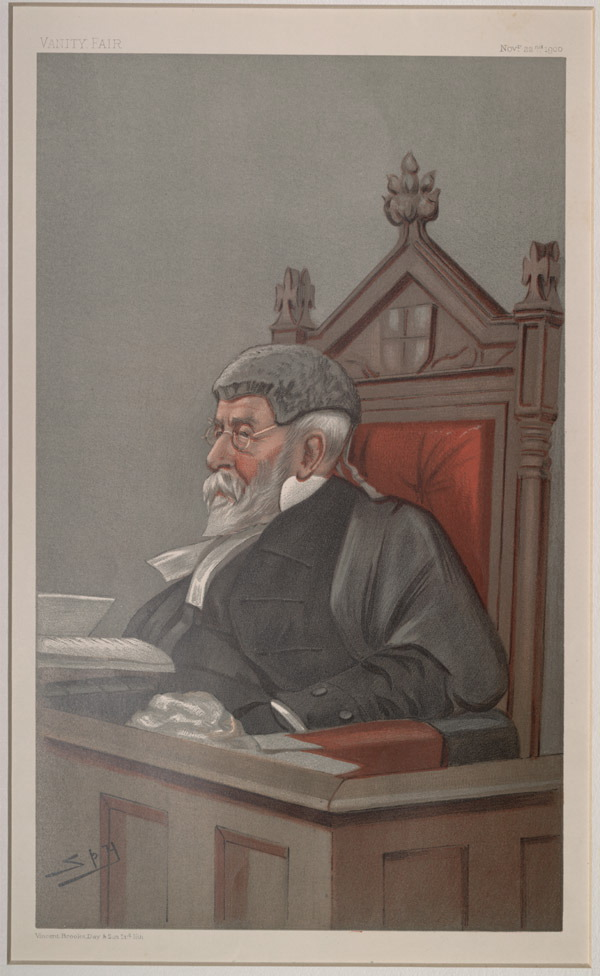
Robert Malcolm Kerr as caricatured by 'Spy' in Vanity Fair (1900)

Mr Commissioner Robert Malcolm Kerr LL.D (5 June 1821–21 November 1902), was a British judge of the late Victorian era.

== Career ==
Born in Glasgow, the son of John Kerr (1791-1853), a writer for The Signet, and Elizabeth (née Malcolm), 'Commissioner Kerr' was educated at the University of Glasgow and then become an Advocate at the Faculty of Advocates in his native Scotland in 1843 before moving to London where he became a barrister in Lincoln's Inn in 1848. By 1851 Kerr was a Deputy County Court Judge on the Northern Circuit, and also lectured on Law for the Incorporated Law Society; he also edited an edition of Blackstone's Commentaries on the Laws of England. In 1857 he was awarded the degree of LL.D by the University of Glasgow.

In 1859 he was the last person to be elected by the Common Council of the City of London as a Judge of the Sheriff's Court of the City of London and then became a Judge at the Guildhall Court in the City of London for 43 years. He twice failed to get into Parliament as a Liberal party candidate,, for Peterborough in 1874 and for Kilmarnock Burghs in 1880. Despite being offered an extremely generous pension, he refused to retire from his position at the City of London Court.

The written biography accompanying his 1900 Vanity Fair caricature said of him:

"He administers a kind of rough and ready justice that irritates many and pleases few. His worst faults are his inclination to decide cases when only part heard and his occasional disregard of the existing state of the Law. For years he has successfully defied the High Court by persisting in refusal to trouble himself by taking notes of his cases. He does not believe in juries, and it is his special delight to ridicule the Mayor's Court which sits over the way.".

He had a reputation for bluntness to the point of rudeness. In cases in which he was involved he variously told counsel, "You've said it three times; now say it three times more, and that will be once for each of the jury and once for me." On another occasion he remarked "Don't talk, sir; hold your tongue. Get into Parliament, or the County Council, or some other talking-shop, if you want to talk, but you must not do it here." On yet another occasion he told a solicitor to "go and buy a shilling Guide to the Law". However, his biographer said of him that "His rugged manners hid, and barely hid, a heart of gold".

He was a commissioner of lieutenancy for the City of London, a Justice of the Peace (JP) for the County of Dumbarton, and for Westminster, and a Justice of the Peace and Deputy lieutenant for Middlesex.

Kerr gave two windows to Govan Old church in Glasgow; the 'Emmaus' window in 1891, and 'Christ blessing the children' in 1902. Both were made by Heaton, Butler and Bayne. In St. Martin's Cathedral in Utrecht, the Netherlands, he also erected a tablet in memory of his relative Robert Kerr of Kersland, a religious refugee, who had died in 1680 in that country.

He died at Northwood, Middlesex on 21 November 1902 after having had a stroke.

== Family ==
He married on 2 August 1848 Maria Susannah Soley Knight, daughter of Charles Knight, of London. She died in 1884. They had two daughters and six sons, one of whom was the artist and illustrator Charles Henry Malcolm Kerr, noted as the illustrator of the adventure novels of H. Rider Haggard.

== Select publications ==
- Genealogical Notices Of The Napiers Of Kilmahew In Dumbartonshire (1849)
- (with William Blackstone) The Student's Blackstone: Being the Commentaries On the Laws of England of Sir William Blackstone
- The Common Law Procedure Act, 1854, (17 & 18 Vict., Cap. 125,) with Practical Notes
- An Action at Law: Being an Outline of the Jurisdiction of the Superior Courts of Common Law, with an Elementary View of the Proceedings in Personal Actions and in Ejectionment
