= Maud Perry Menzies =

Dr Maud Perry Menzies DPH, O.St.J.
- Born: Maud Perry MacDougall; 1911
- Died: 21 June 1997 (aged 85–86)
- Citizenship: British
- Education: University of Glasgow
- Occupation: Medical Officer for Health
- Known for: Creating the Faculty of Community Health in Glasgow Introducing diphtheria immunisation programme in Rutherglen
- Medical career
- Field: Public health
- Awards: Sir William Macewen Medal

Maud Perry Menzies O.St.J. (1911 – 21 June 1997) was a Scottish physician who specialised in community medicine. She introduced significant improvements to public health care in Glasgow.

== Early life and education ==
Maud Perry MacDougall was born in 1911. She studied medicine at the University of Glasgow from where she received her medical degree in 1934 when she was one of a minority of women graduates. As the highest ranked student in surgery that year, she was awarded the Sir William Macewen Medal.

She was a supporter of the Glasgow Football club Rangers.

== Career ==
After qualifying in medicine, Menzies worked as a general practitioner with her husband. In 1938, she returned to Glasgow to take up a post as assistant Medical Officer for Health. At the time, the child death rate in Glasgow was the highest in Europe. She set up a diphtheria immunisation programme in Rutherglen.

Menzies served in the Royal Army Medical Corps (RAMC) during the Second World War, enlisting in 1942. She was posted to Normandy to work with the 79th British General Hospital soon after the D-Day landings in 1944 and served with the RAMC throughout the European campaign.

After the war, Menzies joined the Glasgow school health service. She was an active member of the Scottish branch of the British Medical Association and took a role on council and later as chairman of the Glasgow division. Menzies established the Faculty of Community Health and was on the faculty in the 1970s. In 1990, she was made an officer of the Most Venerable Order of the Hospital of Saint John of Jerusalem by Queen Elizabeth II.

== Death and legacy ==
Menzies died on 21 June 1997. The medical bag and the syringe that she used to administer immunisations are held by the Royal College of Physicians and Surgeons of Glasgow.

== Awards and honours ==
- Sir William Macewen Medal
- 1990, officer of the Most Venerable Order of the Hospital of Saint John of Jerusalem
