= John Hammond Teacher =

Professor of pathology

John Hammond Teacher (1869 - November 21, 1930) was St Mungo (Notman) professor of pathology at Glasgow Royal Infirmary. He wrote The Manual of Pathology and created a pathology museum.

Teacher was born in Old Kilpatrick in 1869. He received his education at Glasgow Academy and at the University of Glasgow.

== Selected publications ==
- On the History of Pathology in the Glasgow Royal Infirmary and the Functions of the Pathological Department, Glasgow Royal Infirmary. Pathology Dept. (1912).
