= Eileen Hayes =

Scottish author, magazine columnist and family counselor

Eileen Hayes MBE (born Margaret Eileen Healy) was a Scottish born author, magazine columnist, qualified family counsellor, frequent broadcaster on TV and radio and mother of four.

== Biography & career ==
Eileen was born in Falkirk, Scotland, to Joseph and Catherine Healy (née Clarkin). Her background included degrees in psychology and health education from the University of Glasgow and King's College London, teaching, health promotion and research. Her career focused on promoting positive parenting techniques, and the better understanding of infants and young children.

As parenting advisor to the NSPCC, over many years she worked on major campaigns such as FULL STOP, Protecting Babies, Not Naughty But Normal, Listen to Children, and Putting Children First and wrote a wide range of their parenting publications, including Baby's First Year, Handle with Care and Encouraging Better Behaviour as well as carrying out a great deal of their media response work on family issues.

Eileen wrote widely about crying, sleep, and tantrums, and published several books on childcare, including Understanding Your Baby (Egmont), Understanding Your Toddler (Egmont), Crying, Tantrums (Hamlyn), and Crying and Comforting (DK). A regular contributor to the media on family topics, on programmes like The Wright Stuff and Woman's Hour, Eileen also made several series of Practical Parenting tips for Living Channel, and presented a parenting slot on BBC series A Family of My Own and Everyone's Got One.

She was Editor-in-Chief of Your Family magazine and website for five years, was parenting expert on www.bbc.co.uk/parenting and Gurgle, and Parenting Consultant to Bounty (parenting club) who deliver publications to all new mothers in the UK.

Eileen's most recent responsibilities included being Chair of the Media and Cultural Change group for the Early Years Champions group, Patron of Parenting UK (of which she was a founder member and Vice-Chair), chair of trustees of Brazelton Centre in the UK, member of the Government sub-group on public education for the early years and Ambassador for Deaf Parenting UK. She also advised on Live Life Give Life's recent campaign The Orgamites, to raise awareness of organ donation in young children, and appeared in Kate & Mim-Mim's information film on friendship. She was also a trustee of Best Beginnings UK, involved in The 1001 Critical Days campaign, and a regular contributor to the Women of the Year Lunch.

== Honours & Awards ==
She was awarded MBE in the 2009 Birthday Honours by Queen Elizabeth II, for services to children and families.

== The Eileen Hayes Fund ==
In 2019, the Brazelton Centre UK launched the 'Eileen Hayes Fund', to provide bursaries to fund or part-fund training in neonatal behavioural observation (NBO) and to support initiatives that will help families with guidance about child development and behaviour that assists parent and baby relationships.

== Published work ==
- Hayes, E. (2010). Encouraging better behaviour - A practical guide to positive parenting. NSPCC.
- Hayes, E. (2010). Out alone: Your guide to keeping your child safe. NSPCC.
- Hayes, E. (2009). Handle with care: a guide to keeping your baby safe. NSPCC.
- Hayes, E. (2009). Home alone: Your guide to keeping your child safe. NSPCC.
- Hayes, E. (2005). Learning how to keep your emotions in check. Early Years Educator, 7(3), 48-50.
- Hayes, E. (2005). Johnson's Your Baby's First Year. DK.
- Hayes, E. (2004). Johnson's Crying & Comforting. DK.
- Hayes, E. (2003). Tantrums: Understanding and Coping with Your Child's Emotions. Hamlyn.
- Hayes, E. (2001). How to Soothe a Crying Baby. Pan.
- Hayes, E. (2000). Understanding Your Toddler. Egmont Books Ltd.
- Hayes, E. (2000). Understanding Your Baby. Egmont Books Ltd.
- Hayes, E. (1996). Baby's First Year. NSPCC.
