= David Shannon (gynaecologist) =

British obstetrician and gynaecologist

David Shannon TD FRCOG (15 November 1876 – 20 April 1933) was a British obstetrician and gynaecologist at the Royal Maternity and Women's Hospital in Glasgow and the Royal Samaritan Hospital

He was born at Greenock. He interrupted his undergraduate studies at the University of Glasgow to join the Army Medical Services during the Second Boer War. He returned, and graduated M.B., Ch.B, in 1901.

He then undertook post-graduate study at the Rotunda Hospital and at the Frauenklinik in Berlin.

He served with the Royal Army Medical Corps during World War I as Captain in the 2nd Lowland Field Ambulance, and saw action at Gallipoli Campaign and the Sinai and Palestine campaign. In 1921 he was promoted to lieutenant-colonel, and was awarded the Territorial Decoration.

In 1926, Shannon was appointed Samaritan Hospital Lecturer in Gynaecology. He also was Lecturer in Clinical Obstetrics at the University of Glasgow Medical School, Assistant to the Muirhead Professor of Midwifery and Gynaeology, and Assistant to the Professor of Midwifery and Gynaecology, Anderson College at the University of Glasgow.

He was a foundation fellow of the Royal College of Obstetricians and Gynaecologists. He also was an active member and officer of many medical societies.

He died at his Glasgow home on 20 April 1933, following a long illness, and was buried at Greenock. He was survived by his wife, also a physician.
