= Alexander Stewart-Wilson =

Alexander Stewart-Wilson FRCOG (13 March 1884 – 2 November 1943) was a Scottish gynaecologist and foundation fellow of the Royal College of Obstetricians and Gynaecologists.

He was born in Glasgow, the son of John Wilson, a grocer. He acquired his MBChB from the University of Glasgow in 1911. In 1913 he went to South Africa and accepted an appointment at the Addington Hospital in Durban.

During the First World War, he returned to England to become Captain in the South Africa Field Ambulance Regiment, serving in France and at the South African Military Hospital in Richmond Park, London.

Following the war, he returned to South Africa, established a successful practice in Durban, and continued his association with the Addington Hospital He was a member of the South African Medical Association.

After a long illness, he died at his home in Durban in 1943. He was described in his obituary in the British Medical Journal as a "brilliant operator, an original thinker, and a man of sound judgment".
