= Ian Hart (neurologist) =

British neurologist (1958–2008)

Ian Kirkland Hart FRCP (14 February 1958 – 10 November 2008) was a British lecturer and consultant in neurology at the Walton Centre in Liverpool. He ran a clinic for neurological paraneoplastic syndromes, myasthenia gravis, neuromyotonia, Lambert–Eaton myasthenic syndrome and autoimmune encephalitis. He was also the founder member of the Walton Centre Clinical Neuroimmunology Group researching on autoantibody-associated neurological diseases.

Hart was born in Cathcart, Glasgow, and obtained degrees from the University of Glasgow and the University of London. He was senior lecturer in neurology at the University of Liverpool.

== Bibliography ==
- Hart, I. K.; Waters, C.; Vincent, A.; Newland, C.; Beeson, D.; Pongs, O.; Morris, C.; Newsom-Davis, J. (1997). "Autoantibodies Detected to Expressed K+ Channels are Implicated in Neuromyotonia". Annals of Neurology. 41 (2): 238–246. doi:10.1002/ana.410410215. PMID 9029073.
- Hart, I. K.; Maddison, P.; Newsom-Davis, J.; Vincent, A.; Mills, K. R. (2002). "Phenotypic Variants of Autoimmune Peripheral Nerve Hyperexcitability". Brain. 125 (8): 1887–1895. doi:10.1093/brain/awf178. PMID 12135978.
