= Paul Sweeney =

Scottish Labour Co-op politician (born 1989)

Paul Sweeney MSP FIES VR
- Official portrait, 2026

Member of the Scottish Parliament for Glasgow (1 of 7 Regional MSPs)
- Incumbent
- Assumed office 6 May 2021

Convener of the Public Petitions Committee
- Incumbent
- Assumed office 10 June 2026

Shadow Minister for Scotland
- In office 3 July 2017 – 13 December 2019
- Leader: Jeremy Corbyn
- Preceded by: Gordon Banks (2015)
- Succeeded by: Chris Elmore

Member of Parliament for Glasgow North East
- In office 8 June 2017 – 6 November 2019
- Preceded by: Anne McLaughlin
- Succeeded by: Anne McLaughlin

Scottish Labour portfolios
- May 2021–Jan 2023: Shadow Minister for Employment and Public Finance
- Shadow Minister for Mental Health

Personal details
- Born: 16 January 1989 (age 37) Glasgow, Scotland, UK
- Party: Scottish Labour & Co-operative Party
- Education: Turnbull High School
- Alma mater: University of Glasgow; University of Stirling
- Website: pauljsweeney.com

Military service
- Branch/service: British Army (Army Reserve)
- Years of service: 2006–18
- Unit: Royal Regiment of Scotland; Royal Corps of Signals

Paul John Sweeney (born 16 January 1989) is a Scottish politician. A member of the Scottish Labour and Co-operative Party, he has served as a Member of the Scottish Parliament (MSP) for the Glasgow region since 2021. He previously served as Member of Parliament (MP) for Glasgow North East from 2017 to 2019. Sweeney is currently the convener of the Public Petitions Committee.

== Early life and education ==
Sweeney was born at Stobhill Hospital in Glasgow on 16 January 1989 to Anne Patricia Sweeney (née Doherty), a bank clerk and John Gordon Sweeney, a shipyard worker. The elder of two brothers, he was brought up in Auchinairn, and Milton. Sweeney attended St. Matthew's Primary School and Turnbull High School in Bishopbriggs.

Sweeney studied for a degree at the University of Glasgow, where he graduated with a first class MA (Hons) in Economic History and Political Science in 2011. At university he also became involved in debating with the Glasgow University Dialectic Society, of which he is an honorary life member. He served as a trustee on the Glasgow University Union's board of management from 2013 to 2020.

== Before politics ==
At the age of seventeen, Sweeney joined the Army Reserve, initially serving in the Royal Corps of Signals with 32 Signal Regiment, before transferring to 52nd Lowland, 6th Battalion of the Royal Regiment of Scotland at Walcheren Barracks.

After an internship with BAE Systems at Portsmouth Naval Base as an undergraduate, Sweeney joined the company's graduate development programme with BAE Systems Maritime – Naval Ships in 2011, based at the Govan and Scotstoun shipyards on the Clyde, where he undertook a series of roles in production engineering and shipbuilding operations management on the Type 45 destroyer, Queen Elizabeth-class aircraft carrier and Type 26 frigate programmes, including co-authoring a 2014 publication on the construction programme for the Type 45 destroyer. Whilst at BAE Systems, Sweeney also initiated a project with the Glasgow School of Art's Digital Design Studio to introduce virtual reality methods into complex naval ship design and construction.

At the end of 2015, Sweeney joined the national economic development agency Scottish Enterprise as a senior executive, working with the leadership of companies across the defence, marine, shipbuilding, aerospace and engineering sectors based in Scotland. In April 2016, he was elected as a Council Member and Fellow of the Institution of Engineers and Shipbuilders in Scotland (IESIS).

== Early political career ==
Sweeney joined the Labour Party and Co-operative Party in 2008 and first became an active campaigner during the 2009 Glasgow North East by-election, after receiving a telephone call from Sarah Brown encouraging him to get involved. While working in the shipyards he joined the Unite and GMB trade unions, later joining PCS whilst at Scottish Enterprise. He is also on the executive committee of the Scottish Fabian Society and a member of Open Labour, Momentum and Campaign for Socialism. Sweeney came to prominence during the 2014 Scottish independence referendum, after he organised an open letter signed by young shipyard workers opposing the break-up of the UK, and subsequently spoke at a rally alongside Gordon Brown on the eve of the referendum.

Sweeney was twelfth on the Scottish Labour Party's regional list for West Scotland in the 2016 Scottish Parliament election.

== Member of Parliament (2017–2019) ==
=== 2017 election ===
At the 2017 general election he stood for Glasgow North East where a 12% swing to Labour led to his defeating Anne McLaughlin of the SNP by just 242 votes, overturning a 25% majority of 9,222 in an unexpected result, having not even prepared a victory speech. McLaughlin had taken the seat from the previous MP, William Bain of the Labour Party at the 2015 general election, and she had been elected with a 39% swing; which was the largest swing at the 2015 general election seen anywhere in the UK. The seat and its predecessors had previously been held by Labour MPs continuously since George Hardie, brother of the Labour Party's founder Keir Hardie, was elected for Glasgow Springburn in 1935. At the age of 28, he was the second youngest Labour MP elected in 2017, after Danielle Rowley.

=== MP for Glasgow North East ===
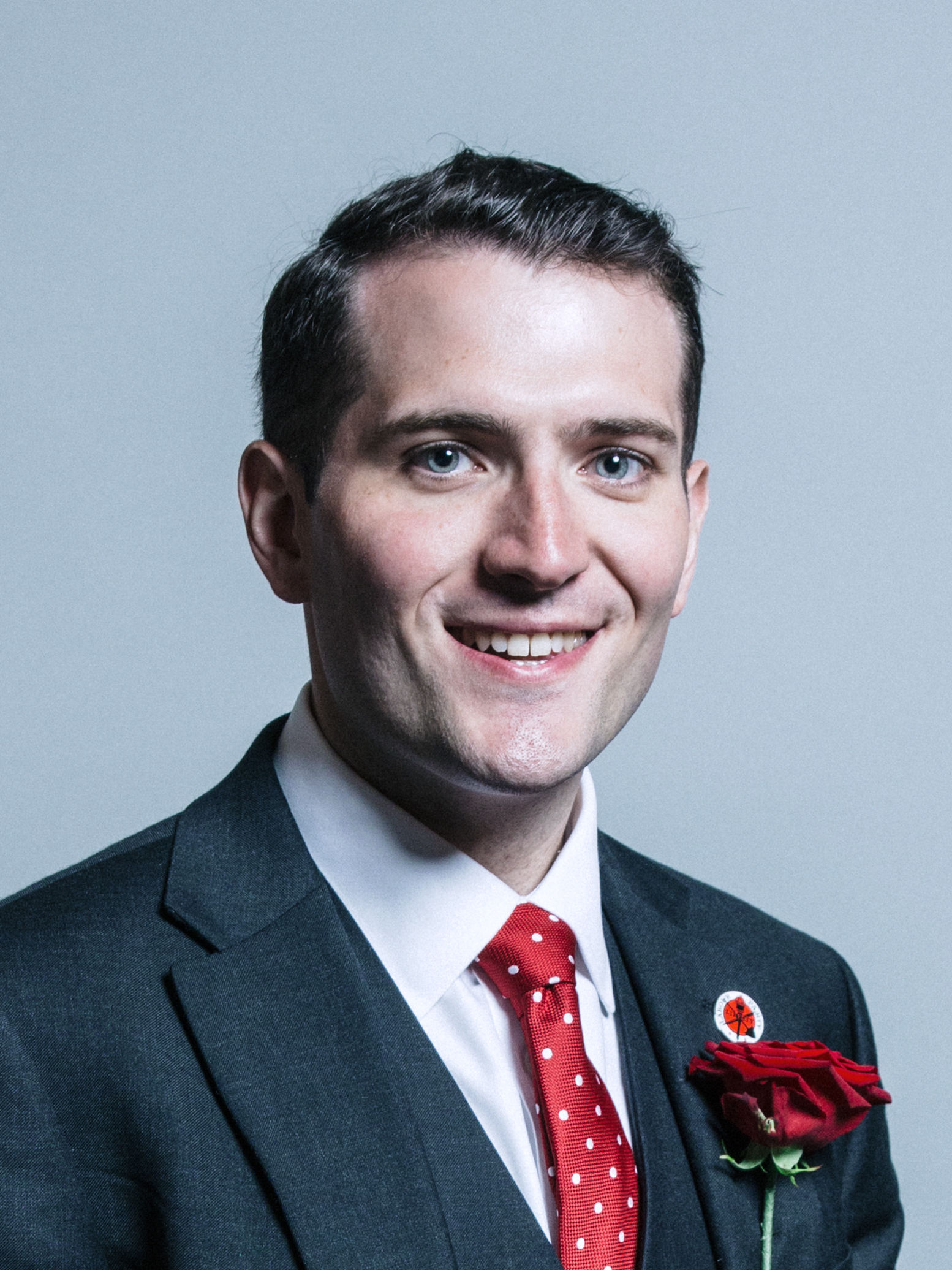
MP Portrait, 2017

On 3 July 2017, he was appointed by Labour leader Jeremy Corbyn as the Shadow Under-Secretary of State for Scotland. During the 2017 Scottish Labour leadership election, Sweeney endorsed Richard Leonard, who was ultimately the successful candidate, having previously worked with him to co-author Scottish Labour's industrial strategy in 2016. In an interview with Ewen MacAskill of The Guardian shortly after his election, he described himself as being on the soft left of the party.

He was a critic of the seven Labour MPs who defected to form Change UK in February 2019, describing them as "self-centred careerists" at a meeting which took place the following month to mark the relaunch of Tribune magazine.

In November 2018, he won 'Best Scot at Westminster' in the annual Scottish Politician of the Year awards, following his lobbying of the Home Secretary and Prime Minister in asylum seeker rights cases such as that of Giorgi Kakava, a ten-year-old orphan who had been threatened with deportation following the death of his mother, the Kamil family who had been left without status for 18 years, teenage brothers Somer and Areeb Umeed Bakhsh, who were also supported by the Labour Party leader Jeremy Corbyn during a visit to Possilpark in August 2018, and trafficking victim Duc Nguyen.

In February 2019, the Daily Record reported that an unnamed Scottish MP had made a formal complaint that Scottish Conservative MP Ross Thomson had groped them in Strangers' Bar in October 2018, in the wake of a similar incident that was alleged to have occurred earlier that month. The Daily Mail named Sweeney as the complainant in November 2019, leading to the chairman of Thomson's local Conservative Association refusing to sign the nomination papers to allow him to stand as a Conservative candidate for Aberdeen South in the December 2019 general election. Thomson's former civil partner also came forward to cite similar instances of behaviour. The Times reported in February 2020 that the investigation had been widened to include a further allegation of a similar nature. In July 2020, Sweeney branded the investigation process "shambolic" and "not fit for purpose". In October 2020, the Parliamentary Commissioner for Standards ruled that the allegation of sexual assault was not upheld by the available evidence. The Commissioner found there was evidence Thomson put his arms around Sweeney and inappropriately invaded his personal space while drunk but ruled there was insufficient evidence to prove beyond reasonable doubt that this behaviour was sexual in nature. It has since been reported that Sweeney is appealing the ruling.

In 2019, he was cited as the least expensive MP in Scotland by the Independent Parliamentary Standards Authority, including: constituency office costs and staff salaries, as well as London accommodation rent and travel costs.

=== 2019 election ===
Sweeney lost his seat to the previous Scottish National Party MP Anne McLaughlin, at the 2019 general election with a marginal majority of 2,458 votes on a 4% swing, the closest result in Glasgow. After losing his seat, he went on to work on Angela Rayner's successful campaign in the 2020 Labour Party deputy leadership election. He described the experience of losing his seat as, “The most spectacular sacking in recent Glasgow history. I was the only scalp in Glasgow that night. It was a fairly unpleasant experience. It's almost like a public execution. It's got a grim voyeurism to it. It's one of the few examples in society where people losing their jobs is treated like a blood sport.”

During the campaign, Sweeney was forced to apologise after tweeting about wanting to play a game of "Whac-a-Sturgeon" a remark the then-First Minister tweeted about saying "What a charmer".

During the COVID-19 pandemic, Sweeney revealed he had begun applying for Universal Credit in May 2020, saying "The reality is, the majority of Scots are working class – if they stopped earning a salary, within two months they'd be in financial difficulties. However prestigious or seemingly privileged you are in terms of your work or identity, you're never far away from that. If more of us realised how close we are to that peril, maybe the social security system wouldn't be so punitive." He later wrote an article describing his experiences of life on social security in December 2020, stating "I will admit that I’ve occasionally had suicidal thoughts in my darker moments over the last few months." He also called for Universal Credit to be converted into a Universal Basic Income system.

== Member of the Scottish Parliament ==
=== 2021 Scottish Parliament election ===
Sweeney was third on Scottish Labour's regional list for the Glasgow region in the 2021 Scottish Parliament election. Following the 2021 Scottish Labour leadership election, Anas Sarwar appointed Sweeney as a spokesman for Trade, Investment and Innovation. Sweeney was elected as an MSP for the Glasgow region in the 6th Scottish Parliament on 8 May 2021.

=== MSP for Glasgow Region ===
He was appointed as Shadow Minister for Employment and Public Finance on 31 May 2021.

In May 2022, Mr Sweeney launched a consultation on his proposed bill, the Drugs Death Prevention (Scotland) Bill, in response to drug related deaths in Scotland, aiming to enable the establishment of Overdose Prevention Centres. In November 2022, he won 'Community MSP of the Year' at The Herald's Scottish Politician of the Year awards for his work on the drugs death crisis, including a bill to establish overdose prevention centres.

In February 2024, Sweeney withdrew his sponsorship of a Scottish Parliament reception organised by ADS Group to celebrate Scottish Apprenticeship Week after public allegations that some of their member companies supplied the Israeli military during the ongoing Gaza war and resulting Gaza humanitarian crisis. The following week Sweeney’s constituency office was raided by pro-Palestine protesters.

Sweeney backed the UK Government’s decision to introduce a means test for the Winter Fuel Payment, voting in the Scottish Parliament against calls to keep it a universal payment.

He was re-elected list MSP in the 2026 Scottish Parliament election.

== Political views ==
Sweeney has called for all private schools in Scotland to be stripped of their charitable status and integrated with the state sector. The policy of private school integration was later adopted at the 2019 Labour Party Conference.

A supporter of drug policy reform whilst an MP, in March 2020 Sweeney announced that he was supporting activist Peter Krykant in his efforts to open an unsanctioned supervised overdose prevention site in Glasgow in an effort to persuade the Lord Advocate and Scottish Government to introduce a legal framework to regulate their official operation, in a similar manner to needle and syringe programmes. It started operating in September 2020.

=== Brexit ===
Sweeney campaigned for the UK to remain as a member state of the European Union during the 2016 referendum. As an MP, he was a prominent supporter of the Labour campaign for a confirmatory public vote on the terms of the Brexit withdrawal agreement, voting for that option along with being in a Customs Union and remaining in the Single Market during the Parliamentary votes on Brexit He supported the continuation of freedom of movement for workers.

In leaked WhatsApp messages, the "soft Brexit" position taken by Scottish Labour in its 2019 European Parliament election campaign was criticised by Sweeney, who wrote, "If it's like this then it's a bad misjudgement and I'm having nothing to do with it... Let's hope the NEC [National Executive Committee] kill this bullshit line." Scottish Labour lost both its seats, receiving 9.3% of the vote and coming fifth behind the SNP, Brexit Party, Scottish Liberal Democrats and Scottish Conservatives respectively.

He was also one of 78 Parliamentarians who challenged the five-week prorogation of Parliament by Prime Minister Boris Johnson in the Court of Session. The case, together with a case brought in England and Wales by Gina Miller, was ultimately successful in the Supreme Court, resulting in the quashing of the prorogation on 24 September 2019.

=== UK constitutional reform ===
Although not in favour of Scottish independence, Sweeney has consistently called for major reform to make the UK a federal state, including greater self-government for the Greater Glasgow city region, and replacing the House of Lords with an elected Senate. He has suggested that any future independence referendum should not be a binary vote as in 2014, but instead take the form of a multi-option referendum.

He supports replacing the first-past-the-post voting system for the House of Commons with proportional representation and is a member of the Labour Campaign for Electoral Reform.

=== Asylum and immigration ===
Sweeney opposed Home Office contractor Serco evicting hundreds of asylum seekers from their accommodation across Glasgow. In 2019 he committed Labour to ending unlimited immigration detention in prison-like facilities, including Dungavel. In May 2021, the Home Office arrested two men in Pollokshields leading to a mass protest surrounding the immigration enforcement van. Sweeney addressed the protest and called for Glaswegians to join the picket in support of the detained men. In December 2021, he launched a campaign to extend the Scottish National Entitlement Card eligibility for free bus travel to all asylum seekers resident in Scotland, arguing that the vast majority were fleeing wars and persecution, but until their applications are determined they are not allowed to work, are subject to "no recourse to public funds" visa restrictions and are forced to live in "slum-like" accommodation, with just over £5 a day to live on.

=== Armed forces and veterans ===
Sweeney voiced his concern to the Prime Minister, Theresa May about British participation in the April 2018 missile strikes against Syria, calling for an “internationally policed no-fly zone" over Syria to stop the regime bombing its own population. In the wake of a series of veteran suicides in the summer of 2018, including from his former regiment, He has criticised the British Army and Ministry of Defence for inadequate mental health support for former soldiers, and a lack of sufficient records to establish the scale of the problem, accusing them of ‘passing the buck’ to overstretched military charities like Combat Stress. In 2019, he campaigned to allow over 6,000 personnel currently serving in the British Armed Forces from foreign and Commonwealth countries the right to British citizenship without immigration fees, including the Brigade of Gurkhas. Sweeney also successfully campaigned to restore the Highland Light Infantry memorial in Kelvingrove Park after it was vandalised in February 2019.

Appointed as Scottish Labour's armed forces and veterans spokesman after his election as an MSP, Sweeney has been critical of the decision in the Ministry of Defence's 2021 Defence in a Competitive Age command paper to transfer the historic Royal Scots Borderers battalion from the Royal Regiment of Scotland into the new Ranger Regiment, losing its identity as a Scottish infantry unit, while cutting the size of the Black Watch battalion and also reducing the regiment's pipe bands.

=== Public transport infrastructure ===
Sweeney called for the protection of the proposed route of the Glasgow Crossrail project on the former City of Glasgow Union Railway line from encroachment by residential developers on a site east of the High Street, at Collegelands. Sweeney has called for the extension of High Speed 2 north from Manchester to Glasgow.

=== Local government ===
Sweeney has spoken out against cuts to local public amenities by Glasgow City Council, including the controversial closure of the People's Palace in January 2019, and supporting community-led campaigns against the closure of Whitehill Swimming Pool in Dennistoun, and the city's six municipal golf courses.

During the COVID-19 pandemic, he led calls for Glasgow City Council to abolish a 1996 by-law that bans drinking in the city's public parks and other outdoor spaces, and to license family-orientated beer gardens in the main parks to raise money for the city.

=== Glasgow Works ===
Sweeney led a campaign against the closure of the last railway engineering works in Springburn, the St. Rollox ‘Caley’ Railway Works in concert with the Unite and RMT trade unions, lobbying both the UK and Scottish Governments to renationalise the works In May 2022, it was reported that an application he had made for the railway works site to be designated as listed by Historic Environment Scotland was successful, with the buildings and railway sidings awarded a category B listing.

As vice-chair of the All-Party Parliamentary Group for Shipbuilding and Ship Repair, he frequently raised matters of concern about Ministry of Defence's National Shipbuilding Strategy, co-authoring a report that was published in May 2019. He called for greater investment in improvements to the Clyde's shipyard infrastructure, a long-term continuous shipbuilding programme from Defence Equipment and Support, condemned delays to Type 31 frigate procurement, and was part of a successful campaign to get acommitment from the Ministry of Defence that the Royal Fleet Auxiliary's planned Fleet Solid Support Ships are built in British shipyards.

== Outside politics ==
Sweeney has an interest in built heritage and architectural issues in Glasgow. He is a director of the Glasgow City Heritage Trust, a member of Glasgow Building Preservation Trust and has led walks as part of Glasgow Doors Open Days Festival for several years. Sweeney was also involved in the restoration of the historic former Govan shipyard head offices into the Fairfield Heritage Centre in 2014, for which he won an award, and the restoration of the 'Light and Life' sculpture on the former headquarters building of the Scottish Co-operative Wholesale Society in the Kingston district of Glasgow in 2016. In 2021, he became a trustee of The Egyptian Halls SCIO, a Scottish Civic Trust project to save the Alexander 'Greek' Thomson masterpiece.

After campaigning against the demolition of Springburn Public Halls in 2012, he founded the Springburn Winter Gardens Trust, which is working to restore the nearby historic glasshouse in Springburn Park. An £8 million restoration programme by Collective Architecture to convert the building into a major events and performance venue was unveiled by the Trust in October 2020.

Parliament of the United Kingdom
Preceded by Anne McLaughlin	Member of Parliament for Glasgow North East; 2017–2019	Succeeded by Anne McLaughlin
