= Springburn Museum =

Museum in Glasgow, Scotland

Coordinates: 55.881°N 4.230°W

Springburn Museum was set up in the reading room of the Springburn Library, Glasgow, Scotland, as the first independent community museum in the city, presenting material on the industrial heritage of the area.

The Museum was opened by Tom Weir in 1986. It continued to provide a community based resource for historical reference throughout the 1990s. After encountering financial difficulties, the Museum closed in 2001. Subsequently, a more limited display in Springburn Library is complemented by an online entity.

Plans for redeveloping Springburn Winter Gardens announced in 2020 would include some artefacts formerly exhibited at the Museum.
