= St Aloysius' College, Glasgow =

Independent, Jesuit school in Glasgow, Scotland

St Aloysius' College
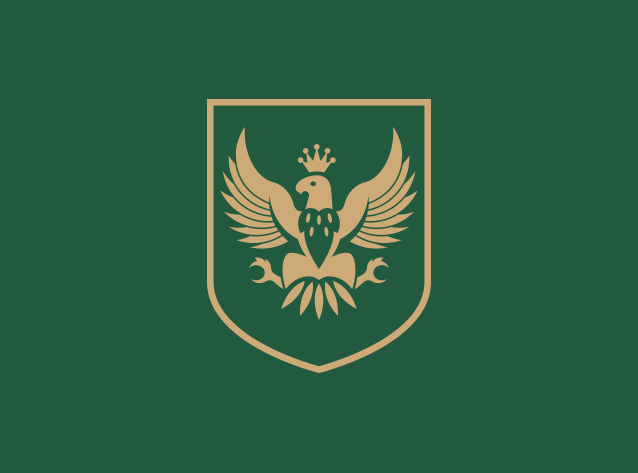

Location
- 45 Hill Street; Glasgow; Scotland; 55.8667°N 4.2635°W

Information
- Type: Private, Catholic, selective, fee-charging, Day School coeducational basic education institution
- Motto: Ad majora natus sum (Latin) (I am born for greater things)
- Religious affiliation: Roman Catholic (Jesuit)
- Established: 12 September 1859; 167 years ago
- Chairman: Isabelle Cullen
- Principal: Séamus Scorgie
- Enrollment: 250 (Junior School); 550 (Senior School); 800 Total
- Colours: Myrtle and Gold
- Alumni: Old Aloysians
- Alma Mater song: "Carmen Aloisianum"
- Publication: The Gonzaga Eagle
- Website: www.staloysius.org

St Aloysius' College is a selective fee-paying, private, Jesuit day school in Glasgow, Scotland. It was founded in 1859 by the Jesuits, who had previously staffed the college, and named after Saint Aloysius Gonzaga. St Aloysius' College is a co-educational school with a kindergarten, junior school, and senior school. The college is part of the international network of Jesuit schools begun in Messina, Sicily in 1548.

== History ==
=== Foundation ===
The school was established on 12 September 1859 at Charlotte Street, near Glasgow Green, in the East End of Glasgow. Here lived the city's largely migrant Catholic community from Ireland and the Scottish Highlands, both of which groups the school was intended to serve. Since 1866, the College's main campus has been situated in Garnethill on the north side of Glasgow city centre, adjacent to the Glasgow School of Art. Originally, the school was for boys only. In 1979, the admission policy was changed by the Governors during the tenure of Headmaster Fr. Henry Anthony Richmond SJ and girls were admitted. Girls now make up half of the school population.

=== Buildings ===
Buildings include the original category-B listed Italianate Chandlery Building, including the administration block, library, and refectory. Its 1908 and 1926 extensions are known collectively as The Hanson Building, which accommodates classrooms for languages and the humanities as well as the school chapel and gymnasium.

The Mount Building, which originally housed the city's first Royal Hospital for Sick Children from 1882, which previously housed the junior school (whose patron is St John Ogilvie) as well as music, art and drama and the kindergarten. As of August 2023, The Mount Building is no longer being used by the school and Music, Art and Drama facilities have all been moved to the convent building, referred to by the school as the Performing Arts Centre, or PAC, while the kindergarten is now its own building. In February 2025 Mr Séamus Scorgie was appointed as Principal of St Aloysius College and started in August 2025.

More modern additions include the Clavius Building housing the Mathematics, Science, and Technology faculty and the Junior School Building, both of which have won RIBA architectural awards, and have been identified as amongst the best modern Scottish buildings.

In 2011, the number of buildings and the size of the campus increased with the acquisition of the Mercy Convent site and buildings. The building houses the schools music and art classrooms, as well as a drama and recording studio.

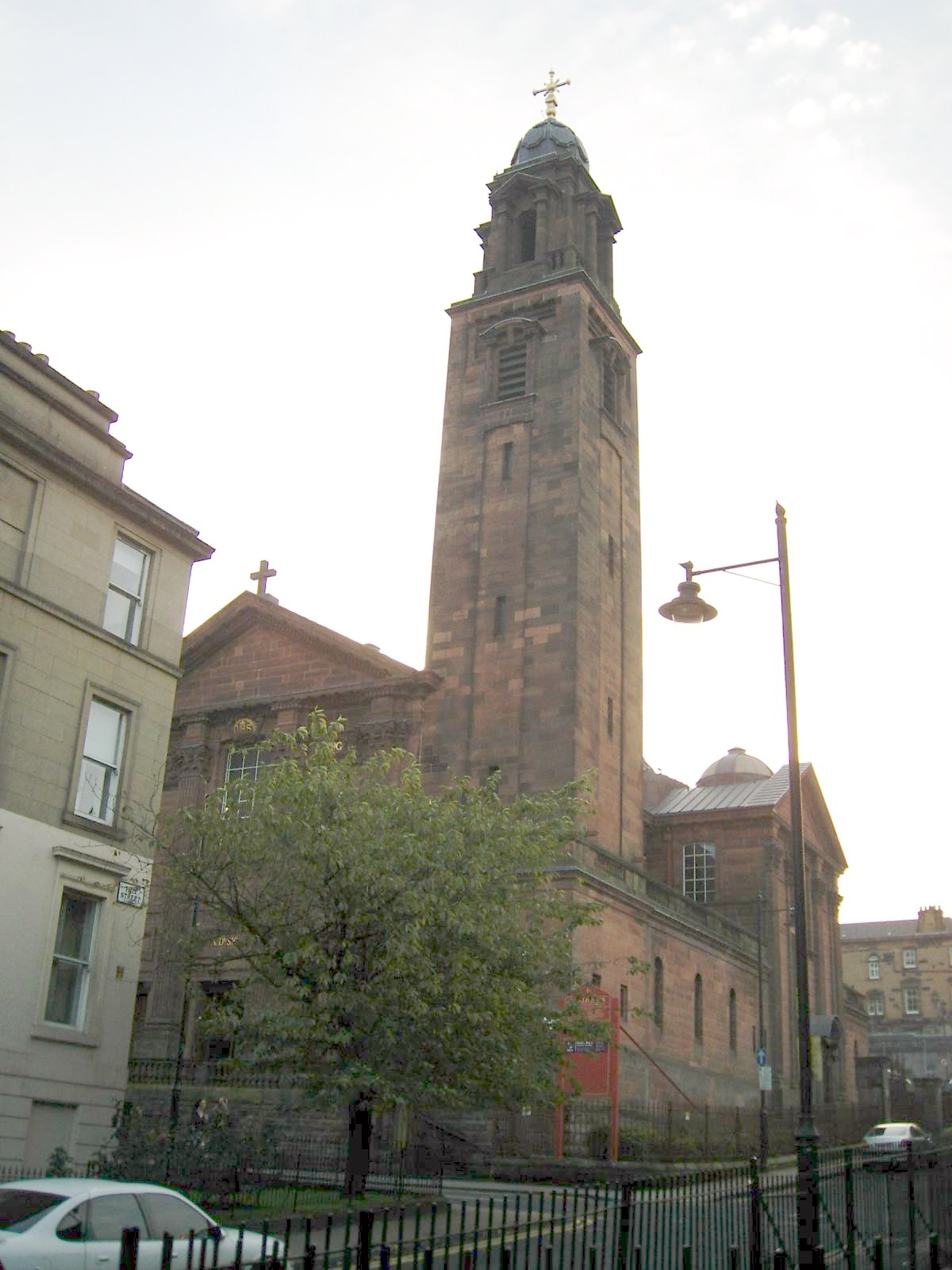
St Aloysius Church next door, associated with the college

The school has a close relationship with the Jesuit parish church of St Aloysius next door. The church is regularly used by the college and Masses offered for both the junior and senior schools. The building is listed category A, designed by C. J. Menart in the baroque revival style and modelled on the Church of the Gesú, original Jesuit headquarters in Rome.

A new Sports Hall was recently constructed on the College campus, and open for use from August 2017. The school's main sports grounds are in the north-eastern part of the city at Millerston.

=== Prefects of Studies ===
- 1859-60 - Fr James Corry, SJ
- 1860-61 - Fr John Biden, SJ
- 1861-65 - Fr Thomas Brown Parkinson, SJ
- 1865-66 - Fr Charles Wilson, SJ
- 1866-69 - Fr John MacLeod, SJ
- 1869-70 - Fr Anthony Foxwell, SJ
- 1870-71 - Fr Thomas Brown Parkinson, SJ
- 1871-73 - Fr James Maguire, SJ
- 1873-75 - Fr John Lea, SJ
- 1875-78 - Fr Francis Bacon, SJ
- 1878-80 - Fr Francis Scoles, SJ
- 1880-81 - Fr James Hayes, SJ
- 1881-82 - Fr Henry Parker Lander, SJ
- 1882-88 - Fr Peter Chandlery, SJ
- 1888-93 - Fr Gerald Tarleton, SJ
- 1893-95 - Fr Albert Kopp, SJ
- 1895-99 - Fr Edward Etherington, SJ
- 1899-1901 - Fr Patrick Flynn, SJ
- 1901-26 - Fr Eric Hanson, SJ
- 1926-32 - Fr Joseph Bullen, SJ
- 1932-38 - Fr Marcus Ambrose, SJ
- 1938-45 - Fr Thomas Sheridan, SJ
- 1945-49 - Fr Thomas Calnan, SJ
- 1949-56 - Fr Thomas Lakeland, SJ
- 1956-71 - Fr John Tracey, SJ

=== Headmasters ===
- Father William Forrester, SJ – (1971-1977)
- Father Henry Anthony Richmond, SJ – (1977–1991)
- Rev. Dr. James Hanvey, SJ – (1991–1995)
- Father Adrian Porter, SJ – (1995–2004)
- Mr John E Stoer – (2004–2013)
- Mr John Browne – (2013–2016)
- Mr Matthew D. Bartlett – (2016–2022)
- Mr Patrick Doyle – (2023-2024)
- Mr Michael Burrowes – (2024-2025)
- Mr Séamus Scorgie – (2025-)

== Junior School and Kindergarten ==
St Aloysius' College Kindergarten and Junior School in Glasgow support children from the ages of 3 to 12 years old. The kindergarten is situated in the Mount Building, while the Junior school is in a modern building along Hill Street. As well as attending lessons in the Junior school, the pupils will also receive preparation for the sacraments of Reconciliation, Confirmation and First Holy Communion as part of the school's three-fold tuition for their academic, social and spiritual lives.

== Sport ==
St Aloysius' College's rugby team won the Scottish Rugby U16 Schools' Cup Final in 2016, and in 2022, the U18 1st XV won the schools’ shield final.

== Notable alumni ==
Arts and Media

- A. J. Cronin (1896–1981) – author
- Canon Sydney MacEwan (1908–1991) – singer
- Ian Bannen (1928–1999) actor
- James Loughran (1931–2024) conductor
- Tom Conti (born 1941) – actor
- Sean Scanlan (1948–2017) – actor
- Christopher Whyte (born 1952) – novelist
- Paul Coia (born 1955) – broadcaster
- Fred Morrison (born 1963) – musician
- Armando Iannucci (born 1963) – comedian
- Sanjeev Kohli (born 1971) – comedian

Academia and medicine

- Owen Hannaway (1939–2006) – historian
- Patrick J. O'Donnell (1948–2016) – university lecturer
- Prof Sir Harry Burns (born 1951) – Ex-Chief Medical Officer for Scotland, now professor of global public health at the University of Strathclyde
- Prof John Joseph Haldane (born 1954) – professor of philosophy

Business

- Ian Bankier (born 1952) – former chairman of Celtic Football Club and executive chairman of Glenkeir Whiskies Ltd.

Politics and law

- James Marley (1893–1954) – politician
- Seamus O'Donovan (1896-1979) - IRA's top emissary to Nazi Germany
- John Thomas Wheatley (1908–1988) – Baron Wheatley, politician and judge
- Patrick Kavanagh CBE (1923–2013), senior police officer
- Joseph Beltrami (1932–2015) – Glasgow defence lawyer
- James Stuart Gordon (1936-2020) – Lord Gordon of Strathblane, CBE
- The Rt Hon Lord Gill (born 1942) – former Lord President of the Court of Session
- Michael Scanlan (1946–2015) – Former President of the Law Society of Scotland
- Gerald Malone (born 1950) – former MP
- Paul McBride (1964–2012) – QC, lawyer
- Austin Lafferty, (born 1959) former President of the Law Society of Scotland
- Polly Higgins (1968–2019) – barrister, author and international environmental lawyer, founder of the ECOCIDE initiative, advocate for the recognition of Ecocide as a criminal offence
- Martin McCluskey - MP for Inverclyde and Renfrewshire West

Religious

- John Maguire (1851–1920) – Archbishop of Glasgow
- Rt Rev James Black (1894–1968) – first bishop of Paisley
- Most Rev James Donald Scanlan (1899–1976) – former archbishop of Glasgow
- Rt Rev Stephen McGill (1912–2005) – former bishop of Argyll and the Isles and second bishop of Paisley
- Rev James J. Quinn (1919–2010) – priest, hymnwriter and ecumenist.
- Maurice Taylor (1926–2023), Bishop of the Diocese of Galloway
- Rt Rev Peter Antony Moran (1935-2026) – emeritus Bishop of Aberdeen

Sports

- Charlie Church (1929–2010) – footballer
- James Craig - rugby union - former Scotland international rugby union player
- Carlo di Ciacca (born 1977) – former rugby union player
- Matthew Urwin (born 2005) – rugby union player
- Andy Walker (born 1965) - former football player for Motherwell, Celtic, Bolton Wanderers, Sheffield United, and Ayr United. Won 3 International caps for Scotland
- Dan York – rugby union player

== Buildings ==
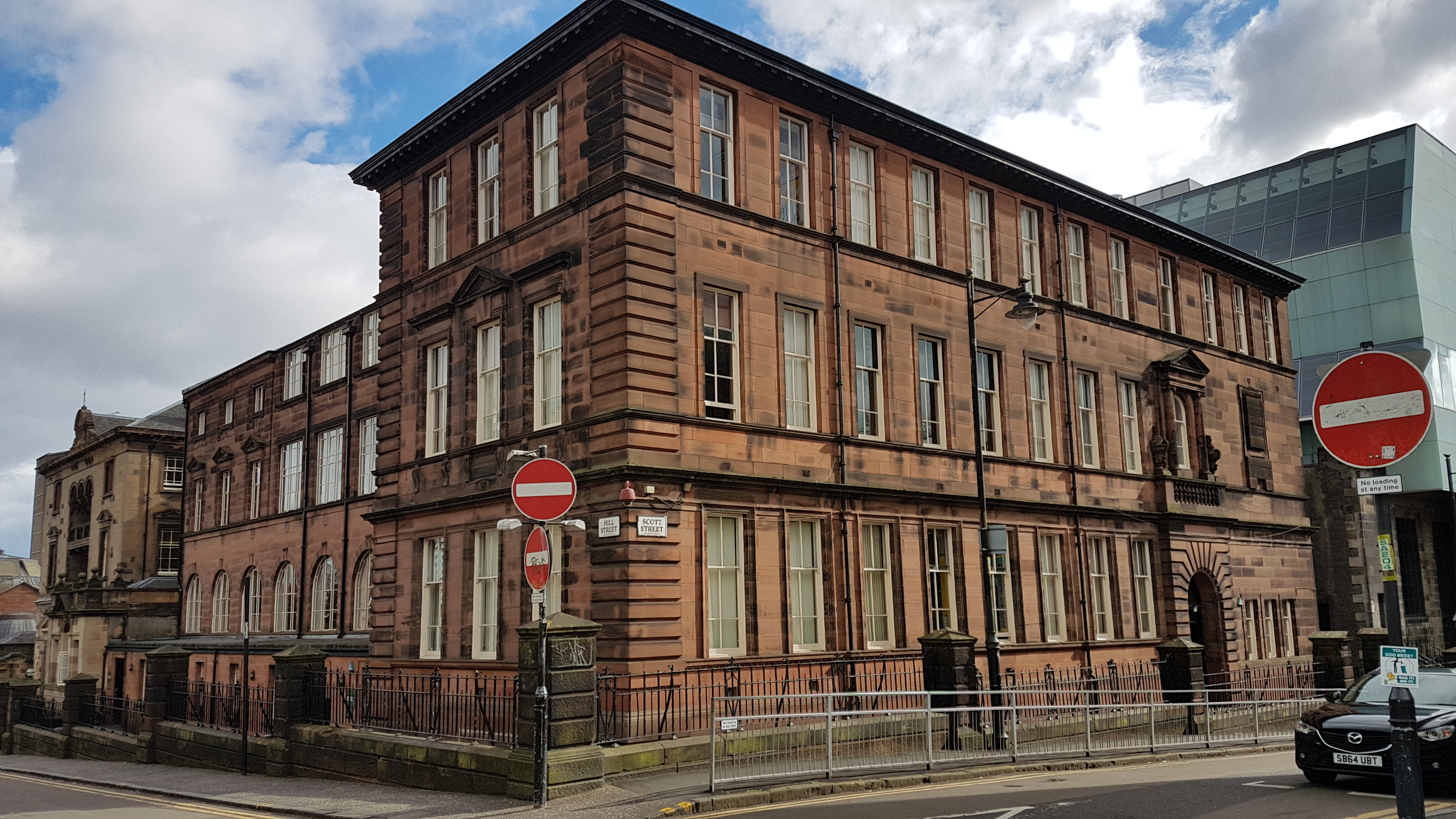
Scott Street building

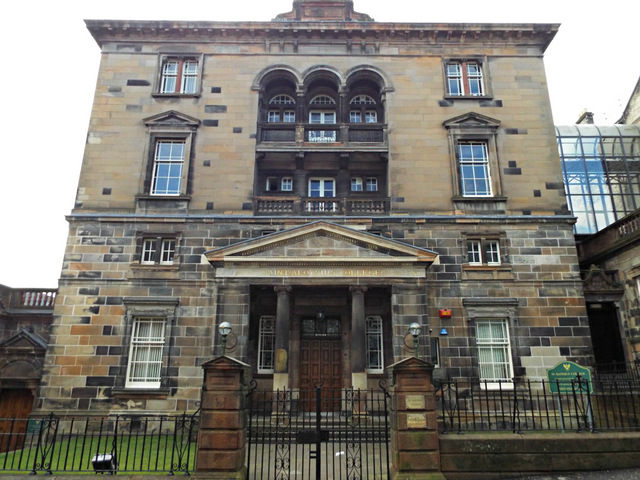
Hill Street building

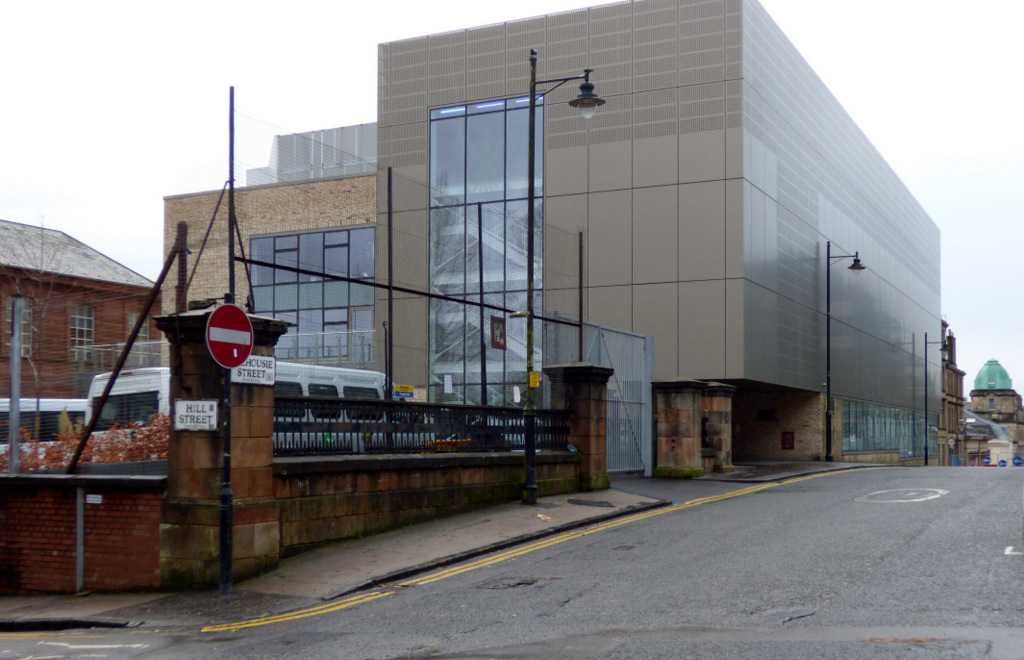
Sports complex on Dalhousie Street, opened 2017.

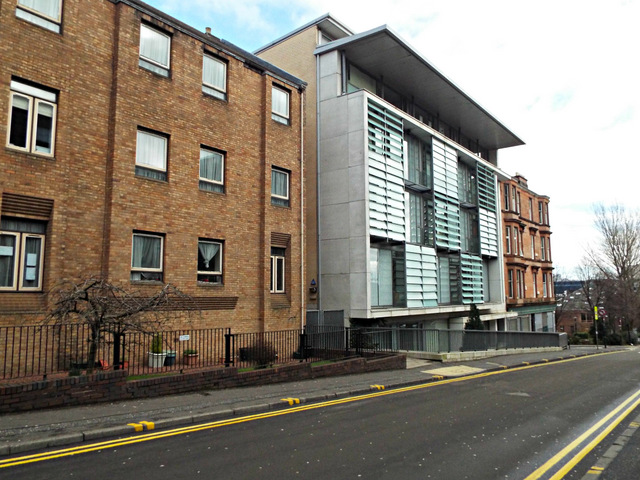
Junior School building

== See also ==
- List of Jesuit sites
