= Menart =

Menart may refer to:

- Charles Ménart, Belgian architect
- Janez Menart, Slovenian poet
- Menart Records, a Slovenian record label
