= Centre for Enabling EA Learning & Research =

Philanthropic organization in Blackpool, UK

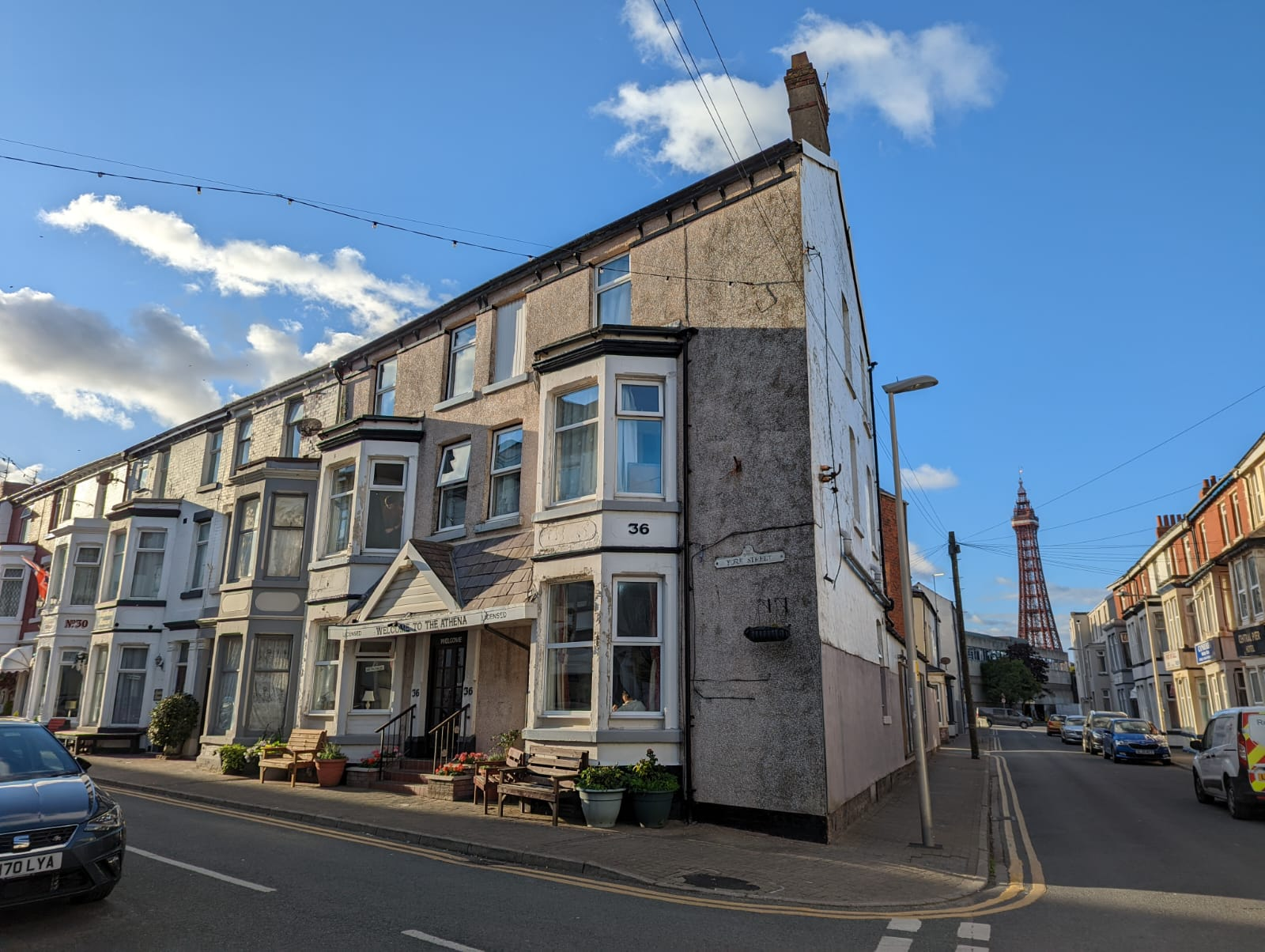

- Centre for Enabling EA Learning & Research (Blackpool)
- Abbreviation: CEEALAR
- Formation: June 2018; 8 years ago
- Registration no.: 1189768
- Legal status: Charitable incorporated organisation
- Headquarters: Blackpool, England
- Location: Athene Hotel, 36, York Street, Blackpool, England
- Coordinates: 53.81078°N 3.05229°W
- Chair: Dr Gregory Hamish Colbourn
- Affiliations: Effective altruism
- Website: www.ceelar.org
- Formerly called: EA Hotel

The Centre for Enabling EA Learning & Research (abbreviated CEEALAR, formerly EA Hotel) supports individuals to self-educate and work towards charitable aims within the framework of effective altruism (EA). It provides successful applicants with grants for free or subsidised accommodation, catering within the centre and a stipend.

== History ==
The centre was founded by Greg Colbourn, a former 3D-printing entrepreneur who became involved in the effective altruism movement. He announced the purchase of a former 17-room hotel in central Blackpool in an effective altruism forum on the 4th of June 2018. The hotel cost £130,000, which he paid for using personal profits from successful cryptocurrency investments. CEEALAR was registered as a charitable incorporated organisation in England and Wales on the 3rd of June 2020.
