= Springburn =

Coordinates: 55.883141°N 4.228525°W

Springburn: Scottish Gaelic: Allt an Fhuarain; Scots: Springburn
- Inner-city district
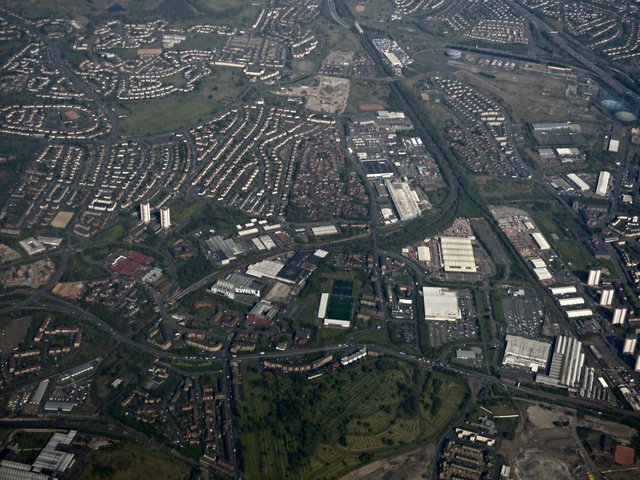
- View of Springburn from aircraft looking east (2017)

- Location within Glasgow
- Population: 12,064 (2012)
- OS grid reference: NS607678
  - Edinburgh: 65 km
  - London: 557 km
- Council area: Glasgow City Council
- Lieutenancy area: Glasgow
- Country: Scotland
- Sovereign state: United Kingdom
- Post town: Glasgow
- Postcode district: G21
- Dialling code: 0141
- Police: Scotland
- Fire: Scottish
- Ambulance: Scottish
- UK Parliament: Glasgow North East
- Scottish Parliament: Glasgow Maryhill and Springburn

Springburn (Scottish Gaelic: Allt an Fhuairainn) is an inner-city district in the north of the Scottish city of Glasgow, made up of generally working-class households.

Springburn developed from a rural hamlet at the beginning of the 19th century. Its industrial expansion began with the establishment of a chemical works by Charles Tennant on the newly opened Monkland Canal at nearby St. Rollox in 1799, which later became part of the United Alkali Company.

Later in the 19th century, the construction of railway lines through the area led to the establishment of railway works and the village became a parish in its own right. The Garnkirk and Glasgow Railway first opened in 1831 to supply the St Rollox Chemical Works and the Edinburgh & Glasgow Railway was opened in 1842. Later, the City Union Line was extended to Springburn in 1871, and the Hamiltonhill Branch Line opened in 1894.

Initially located outside the Glasgow boundary, the core area was eventually absorbed by the city in 1872 and other parts in 1891. In the early 21st century, it forms part of the Springburn/Robroyston ward under Glasgow City Council.

== Industrial development ==
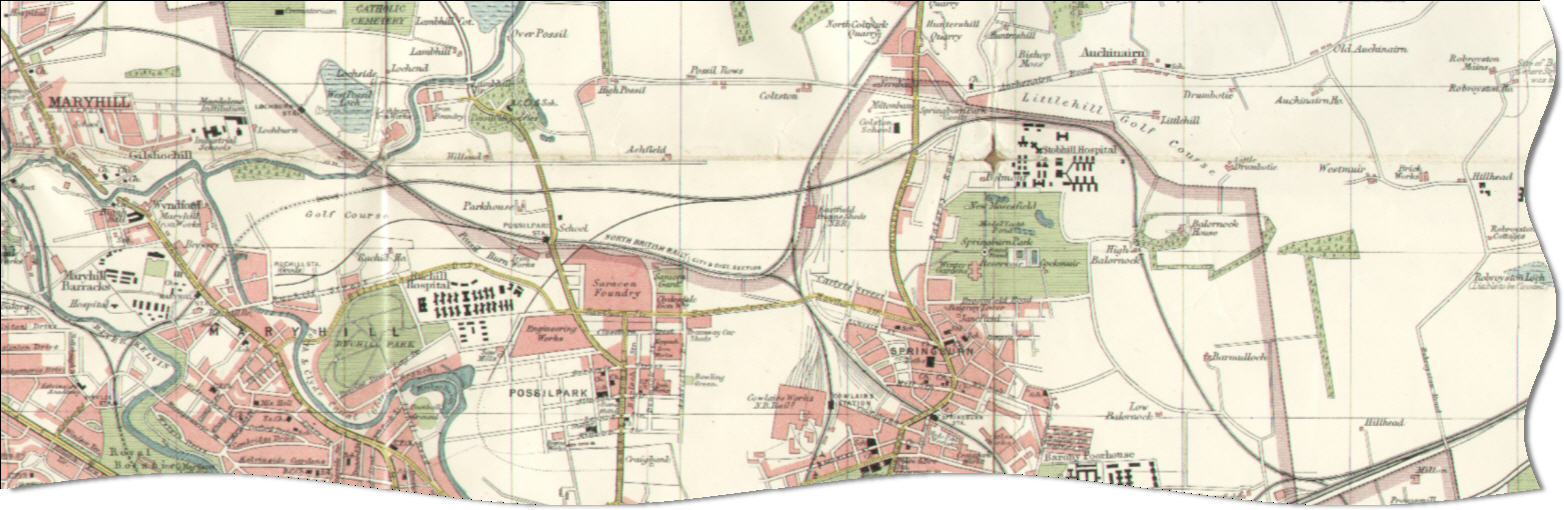
Map of North Glasgow including Springburn, published in 1923

The area's economic development has a strong historical link to heavy industry, particularly railways, with the manufacturing of locomotives. In the past, Springburn's locomotive industry had a 25% global market share.

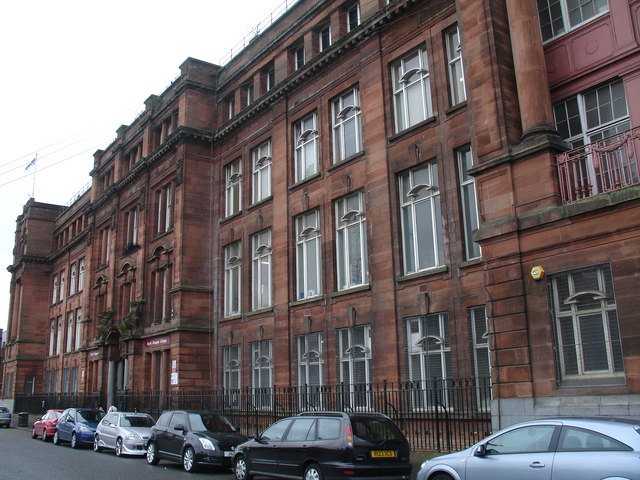
Former headquarters of the North British Locomotive Company in Springburn was designed by James Miller and completed in 1909. From 1961 the building was the campus of North Glasgow College and was converted into an office complex in 2009.

There were four main railway manufacturing sites that located in Springburn; the North British Railway's (NBR) Cowlairs Works in 1841, the Caledonian Railway's St Rollox Works in 1856, Neilson & Company's Hyde Park Works in 1861 and Sharp, Stewart & Company's Atlas Works in 1888. The latter two eventually amalgamated to become part of the North British Locomotive Company (NBL) in 1903. Also located in Springburn is the Eastfield Running Shed, originally built by the NBR near the Cowlairs Works in 1904.

St Rollox became the largest works, and is the only one still in existence, after the collapse of the NBL in 1962 and the closure of Cowlairs in 1968. In 2007 Railcare Limited, who also owned the Wolverton Works in Milton Keynes, took over operations at St Rollox, from Alstom, who had originally acquired the works from British Rail Engineering Limited in the wake of the railway privatisation. It closed in 2019. The former Eastfield Running Sheds are now operated as a maintenance depot by ScotRail and part of the former Cowlairs carriage sidings is now operated as a signalling and maintenance depot by Network Rail.

Another large industrial company that operated in Springburn was Promat UK, which manufactured Passive fire protection materials at the Germiston Works on Petershill Road. The site is now closed.

== Social development ==
=== Springburn Park ===
The highest point in the district and in the City of Glasgow is Springburn Park on Balgrayhill, 364 feet (111 metres) above sea level. The park contains the Springburn Winter Gardens, which has lain derelict since 1983. Stobhill Hospital was later built adjacent to the park in 1904.

=== Barnhill Poorhouse ===
The Barnhill Poorhouse at Springburn opened in 1850. Paupers who could not support themselves were sent here by the Parish and were obliged to work at jobs such as bundling firewood, picking oakum (separating tarred rope fibres) and breaking rocks. In 1905 the Glasgow Poorhouse in Townhead closed and its inmates went to Barnhill, making it the largest poorhouse in Scotland. In 1945 it was renamed Foresthall Home and Hospital and was thereafter used as a geriatric hospital and residential home. It was demolished in the late 1980s and a private housing development now stands on the site.

=== Sport ===
Local football team Cowlairs were a founder member of the Scottish Football League in 1890 but were bankrupt by 1896. Another local team, Northern also played in the SFL for a single season in the 1890s. Petershill was founded in 1897 and continues to play today at New Petershill Park, a modern stadium with a 2,000 capacity, including a 562-seat stand.

== Regeneration ==
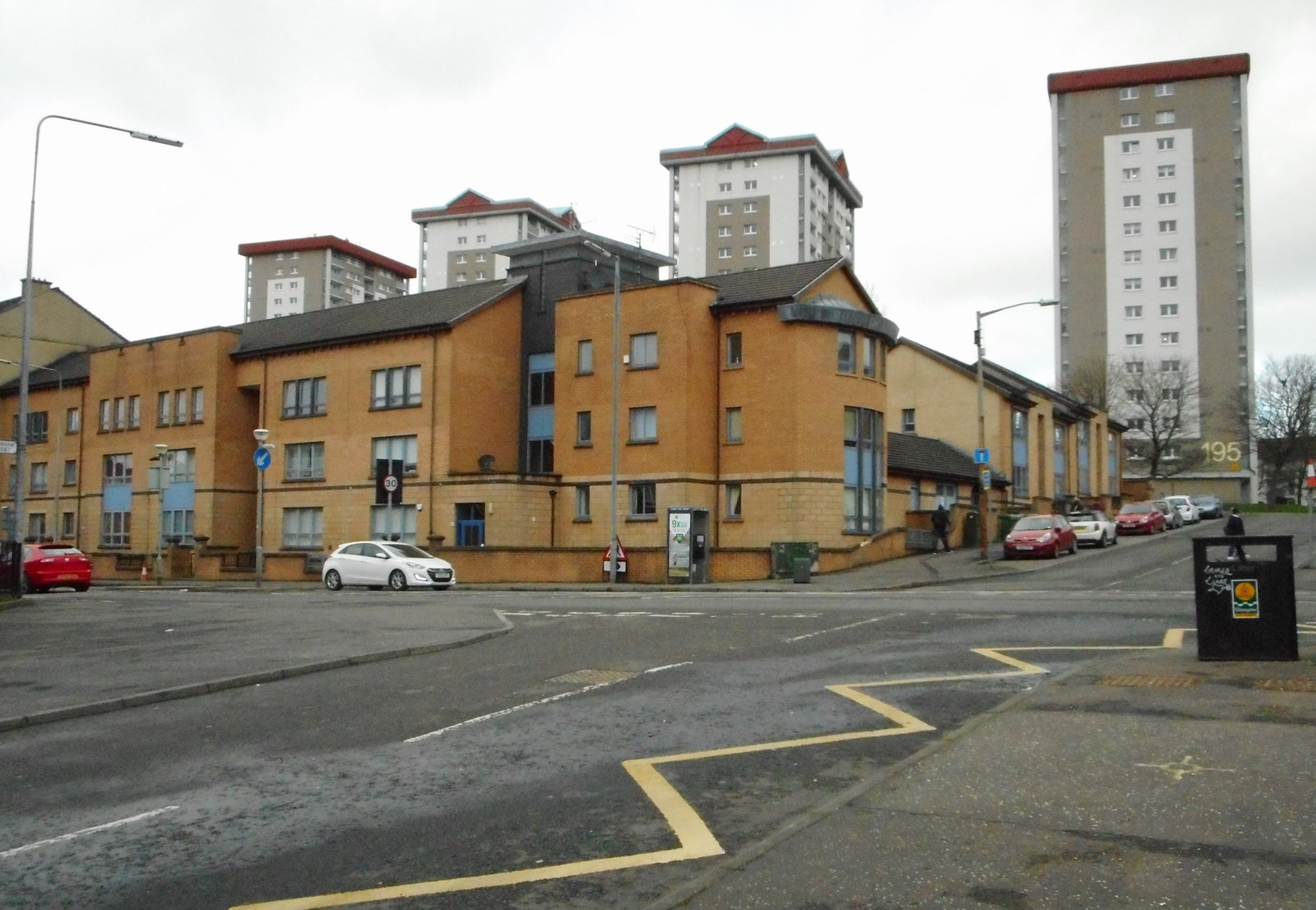
Modern housing accommodation and 1960s style high rise flats in Springburn

Springburn continued to see expansion during the 20th century, with housing schemes such as Balornock being developed in the Interwar period, while those in Balgrayhill, Barmulloch (which also included one high-rise development at Birnie Court, part of the Red Road flats) and Sighthill being constructed post-WWII.

The old urban centre of Springburn was redeveloped from the early 1970s to the early 1980s. Selected as one of Glasgow's "Comprehensive Development Areas", Springburn saw the demolition of 85% of buildings in the district and the construction of a sequence of housing estates which transformed the area completely. A major dual carriageway, the A803 Springburn Expressway (originally designed to be the northern link to the aborted Glasgow Inner Ring Road) was completed in 1988.

The regeneration vision remained incomplete, and by the mid-1980s Springburn had become one of Glasgow's most notorious areas, exacerbated by decaying housing and lack of major employers to replace the decline in the railway industry, despite the creation of North Glasgow College (now Glasgow Kelvin College) at the former North British Locomotive Company headquarters in 1965. Since then, there has however been further efforts to regenerate the area.

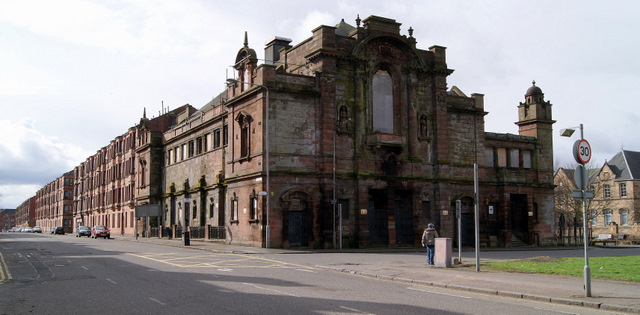
Springburn Public Halls, as they appeared in 2010 prior to demolition

More recently the area of Keppochhill Road, which links Springburn with Possilpark, has been regenerated through the work of the West of Scotland Housing Association Ltd, many of the Victorian sandstone tenement flats in Gourlay Street, Carlisle Street and Keppochhill Road have been renovated and work continues to maintain and improve housing in the area.

New build developments in recent years has seen Glasgow Housing Association high-rise flats demolished or refurbished and new modern low rise houses built in the area. West of Scotland housing Association now has a head office based at 252 Keppochhill Road however the interest of the charitable organisation extends into Ayrshire and Lanarkshire. The most notable surviving architectural feature in this area, the former Springburn Public Halls, was opened in 1902 and designed by William B. Whitie, who also designed Springburn's Public Carnegie library, which latterly formed Springburn Museum until it was closed in 2003. Since closing in the mid-1980s, the Springburn Public Halls were allowed to fall into a state of dereliction and were demolished in December 2012. The Springburn Library building now operates as the Glasgow North Regeneration Agency Conference Centre following a £2 million refurbishment.

== Social problems ==
Many social problems associated with poverty from crime to alcoholism and drug addiction have plagued the area for decades. In the 2001 UK Census, nearly half of the residents in Springburn said they did not have any formal qualifications, the fourth-highest figure in the UK, and almost two-thirds said they did not own a car, second only to Shettleston; also in Glasgow. That same year, it was reported that 40% of Springburn's residents were living in poverty, the area's unemployment rate was 140% higher than Scotland's average, deaths from lung cancer was twice higher than the Scottish average and the proportion of children leaving school without Standard Grades was four times higher. The average household income was £13,310 and male unemployment stood at 13% – the highest level in Scotland.

A study by CACI in 2010 found Springburn to be the most-feared neighbourhood in Scotland for violent crime in a national league table, with 42% of residents living in fear of violence.

In 2012, the "Scottish Index of Multiple Deprivation" analysis by the Scottish Government identified Springburn's Keppochhill as the third-most deprived area in Scotland behind Ferguslie Park and neighbouring Possilpark. According to a 2013 report, 51% of children in Springburn were living in poverty, the highest rate of child poverty in Scotland.

== Transport ==
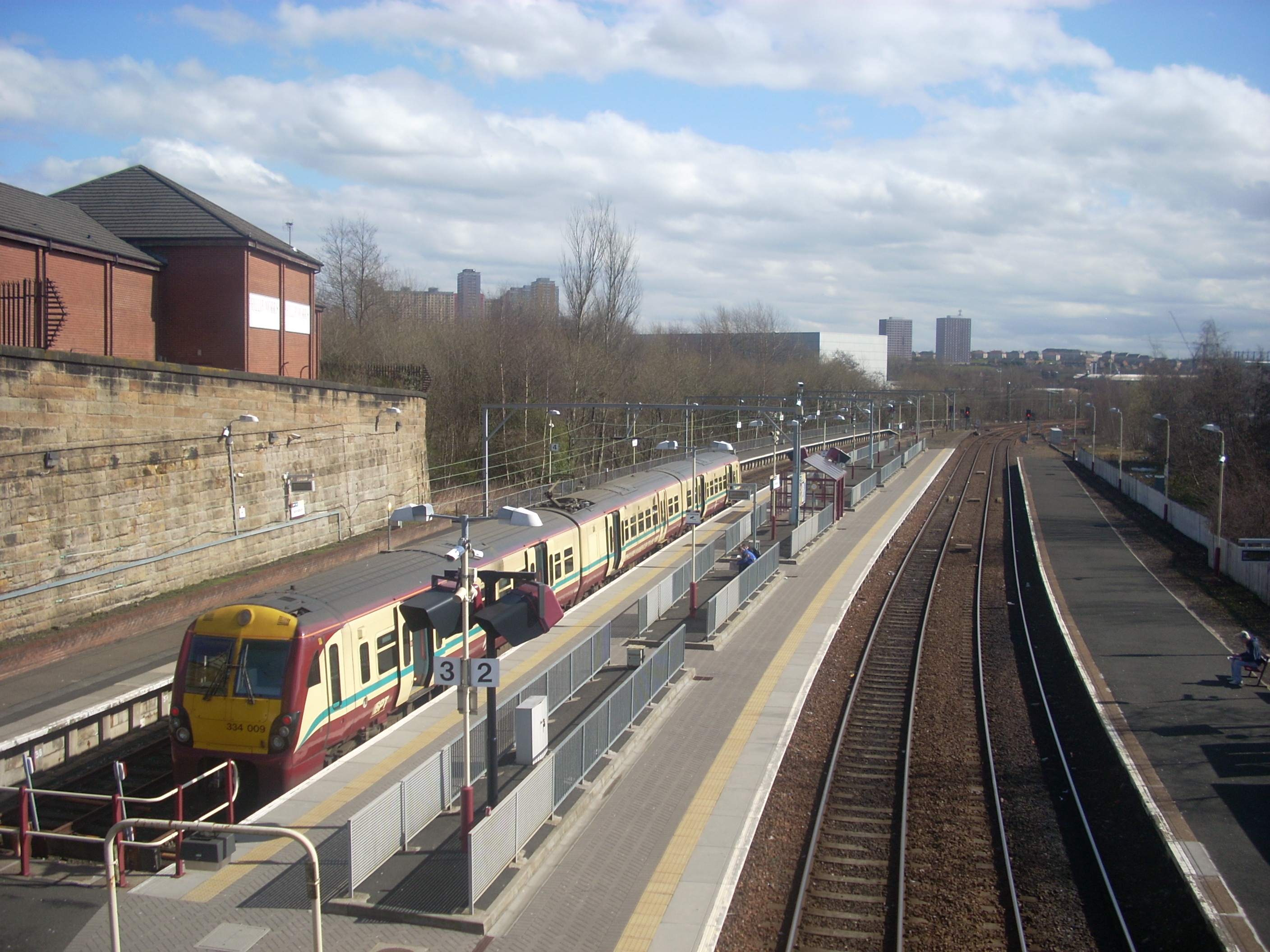
Springburn railway station is the areas main railway station

Springburn is served by Springburn railway station and Barnhill railway station in nearby Petershill, offering regular commuter services on the North Clyde and Cumbernauld lines of the Glasgow suburban rail network. The area is also served by numerous bus routes including the First Bus 88 and 90, and M3.

== Noted residents ==
People from Springburn include Scottish International footballer James McFadden, singer (tenor) Sydney MacEwan, comedian, author and talk show host Craig Ferguson, broadcasters and writers Tom Weir MBE and his sister Molly, politicians Paul Sweeney, John McAllion and Frank McAveety. Springburn's former MP, Michael Martin, was the Speaker of the House of Commons from 2000 to 2009.

Other notable locals include:

- Duncan Campbell, musician
- Peter Capaldi, actor
- Stevie Chalmers, footballer
- Marion Chesney, author
- Robert Florence, presenter
- Bobby Gillespie, musician
- Campbell Christie, trade unionist
- Karl Denver, singer
- Agnes Dollan, suffragist and political activist
- Robert Downie, World War I Victoria Cross recipient
- Valerie Edmond, actress
- Agnes Hardie, politician
- Armando Iannucci, writer
- Mo Johnston, footballer
- Anne Lacey, actor
- Markee Ledge – Kosheen, musician/songwriter/DJ
- Sydney MacEwan, singer
- Jimmie Macgregor, folksinger
- Frank McAveety, politician
- James McFadden, footballer
- Gavin Mitchell, actor
- Billy Reid, footballer
- Allan Ross, footballer

== See also ==
- Glasgow tower blocks
- List of tallest buildings and structures in Glasgow
