= Sydney MacEwan =

Scottish tenor (1908–1991)

The Very Reverend Sydney MacEwan
- Born: 19 October 1908; Glasgow, Scotland
- Died: 25 September 1991 (aged 82)
- Occupations: Priest, professional singer

Ecclesiastical career
- Religion: Christianity
- Church: Roman Catholic Church
- Ordained: 1944
- Congregations: St Aloysius' Church, Glasgow; St Margaret's Church, Lochgilphead; St Andrew's Church, Rothesay

Canon Sydney Alfred MacEwan (19 October 1908 – 25 September 1991) was a Scottish tenor, who sang traditional Scottish and Irish songs. His name has also been recorded as Alfred Sydney Marley MacEwan (Marley was his mother's maiden name).

== Early life ==
MacEwan was born on 19 October 1908, and raised in the Springburn area of Glasgow by his mother after his parents separated. Sydney was the younger of two brothers. His mother was Irish, from the Portadown area, County Armagh, and his father was born in Partick. The family were poor but Sydney's mother managed to pay for music lessons for both her sons and both won bursaries to good schools. Sydney attended St Aloysius' College in Garnethill from 1919 to 1924, before transferring to Hillhead Academy. He also commenced his singing career.

In 1938, MacEwan retired from concert work, and during World War II was an ambulance driver and an RAF chaplain. He was ordained in 1944.

== Catholic priesthood ==
At age 18, MacEwan entered training to become a Jesuit priest at Manresa House in Roehampton, London. He chose to study at Glasgow University instead. He completed a Master of Arts degree at the university.

Throughout his life MacEwan had retained a love of the Catholic Church and, despite his earlier experience with the Jesuits, chose to abandon his fame and success as a tenor, to enter the Bearsden Seminary in Glasgow before going to Pontifical Scots College in Rome, to follow his vocation to become a priest. He was ordained in St Andrew's Cathedral, Glasgow in 1944 and celebrated his first Mass at St Aloysius' Church.

Combining priesthood and music, he undertook tours of North America and Australia, where those concerts helping to provide funding for the building of St Columba's Cathedral in Oban. He helped with funds to renovate the Church of St Margaret's in Lochgilphead, in Argyll, where he was parish priest for 17 years.

In the Scottish summer of 1947, MacEwan arranged for Australian and New Zealand food parcels which he distributed around the parish:

If these good people could see the poor wee bairns enjoying the contents of the parcels, they would be well rewarded for their great kindness. "It is so heartening to feel that the poor old Mother is being helped in her distress by her young and vigorous children. They have been superb in their charity. God love them all.

When asked in 1948 the clergyman and singer said:

Of the two, I think I prefer a concert audience to a congregation. People listen to me more attentively in a concert than in a church.

However it was quite clear his performances were to fund and secondary to his religious duties, where after ordination he decreed all concert earnings went to charities. MacEwan also rejected the title of a 'singing priest'.

After Lochgilphead, he moved to St Andrew's Church in Rothesay. A stained glass window in the church in Lochgilphead is dedicated to the MacEwan family. His parishioners became accustomed to his concert tours, and enjoyed his return each time. He then moved to Málaga for a time, for health reasons, before returning to be parish priest at St Columba's in Kingussie.

== Singing career ==
While at university, his vocal talents were noticed and he began a singing career on the advice of Sir Compton Mackenzie and Irish tenor John McCormack. At this time he came to the attention of the Scottish region of the British Broadcasting Company, and became heavily involved in many broadcasts, specifically the Children's Hour programme.

He began recording for Parlophone in 1934 while still attending the Royal Academy of Music in London and being tutored by Plunket Greene.

He toured in 1936, playing to audiences in Canada, the United States of America, New Zealand, and Australia, and the tour was repeated in 1938.

Still performing as a priest, MacEwan nonetheless continued to record and tour. Further trips to North America and Australia took place until as late as 1956. At one time he indicated a liking for the style of American crooner Bing Crosby.

=== Australian tours ===
MacEwan's 1936 tour of Australia went as far north as Townsville.

Commencing the 1948 tour in April, MacEwan attended Saint Mary's Cathedral in Sydney. Before Cardinal Francis Spellman, Archbishop of New York, he celebrated a mass for peace, singing the liturgy there. Arriving in Australia by flying boat, he took the mail train firstly to Melbourne as part of the Centenary of the Catholic Church celebrations. Normally his musical public performances were limited towards charitable causes. The tour was with the Australian Broadcasting Commission, with six public performances and eighteen studio recitals in Sydney, Brisbane, Adelaide, Canberra, and Melbourne. He travelled as far as the town of Bowen, Queensland, to see North Queensland and to 'have a surf before the winter set in', delivering a benediction to a large congregation there.

MacEwan's June to October 1951 Australian tour included concerts in Western Australia. Arriving by sea on the SS Oransay in mid-June, he struck down with influenza and was unable to perform in that State and also at Adelaide. It was considered he would be unable to fulfil any singing obligations for the ABC. The money of 'thousands of pounds' raised was going to build the memorial chapel at the Oban Catholic Cathedral, 'be dedicated to the Scottish and Australian soldiers who fell in the Second World War'. At the time his Melbourne attendance with the ABC was also the highest paid fee for a visiting singer.

== Later life and legacy ==
MacEwan was featured on the BBC's This Is Your Life programme in October 1962 and his autobiography, On the High C's, was published in 1973. MacEwan died on 25 September 1991, aged 82. In Ireland, on 1 May of each year, the hymn "Bring flowers of the rarest", also known as "Queen of the May", sung by MacEwan is played over the radio.

== Discography ==
MacEwan's tenor voice was captured in 39 record albums, singles, and EPs. It includes:

- Songs of Scotland and Ireland, sung by Father Sydney MacEwan with orchestra conducted by Philip Green. The Columbia record (330S 1073) was recorded in Australia circ 1950. The rear cover note was written by Mervyn Douglas. Side 1 songs were Scotland the brave, My ain folk, Bonnie Mary of Argylle, The road to the Isles, and Loch Lomond. Side 2 songs were The star of County Down, Mother Machree, Killarney in the Spring, The youth of the heart, and Rose of Killarney.

In 1956-57 Columbia released his LP "Christmas Carols" (CL 924). Neither the organist nor the choir who accompany him are identified in the liner notes. The album includes a rendition of Michael Head's "The Three Mummers" (a modern carol recently recorded by Anne Sofie von Otter and Bengt Forsberg).
