= Sacred Heart Church, Glasgow =

Coordinates: 55.8461°N 4.2233°W

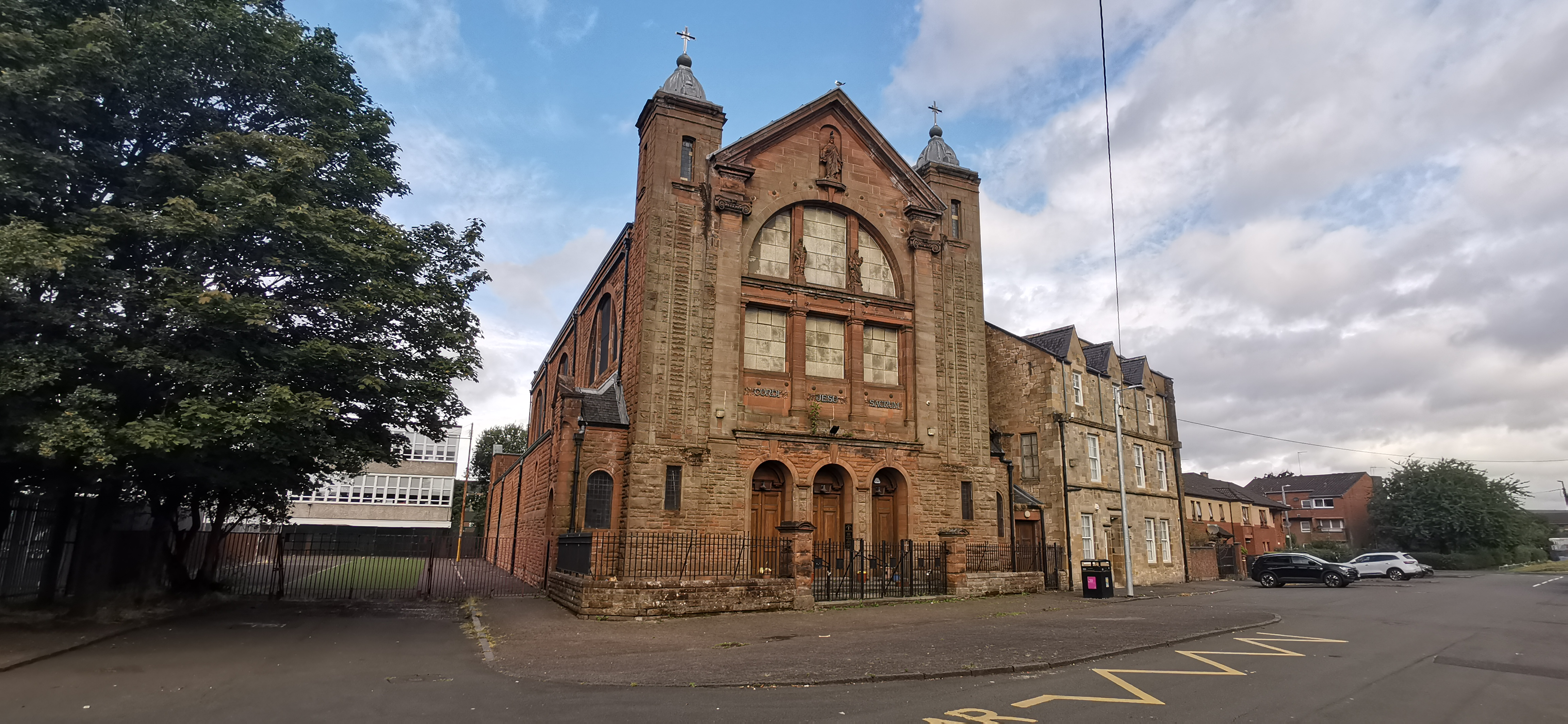

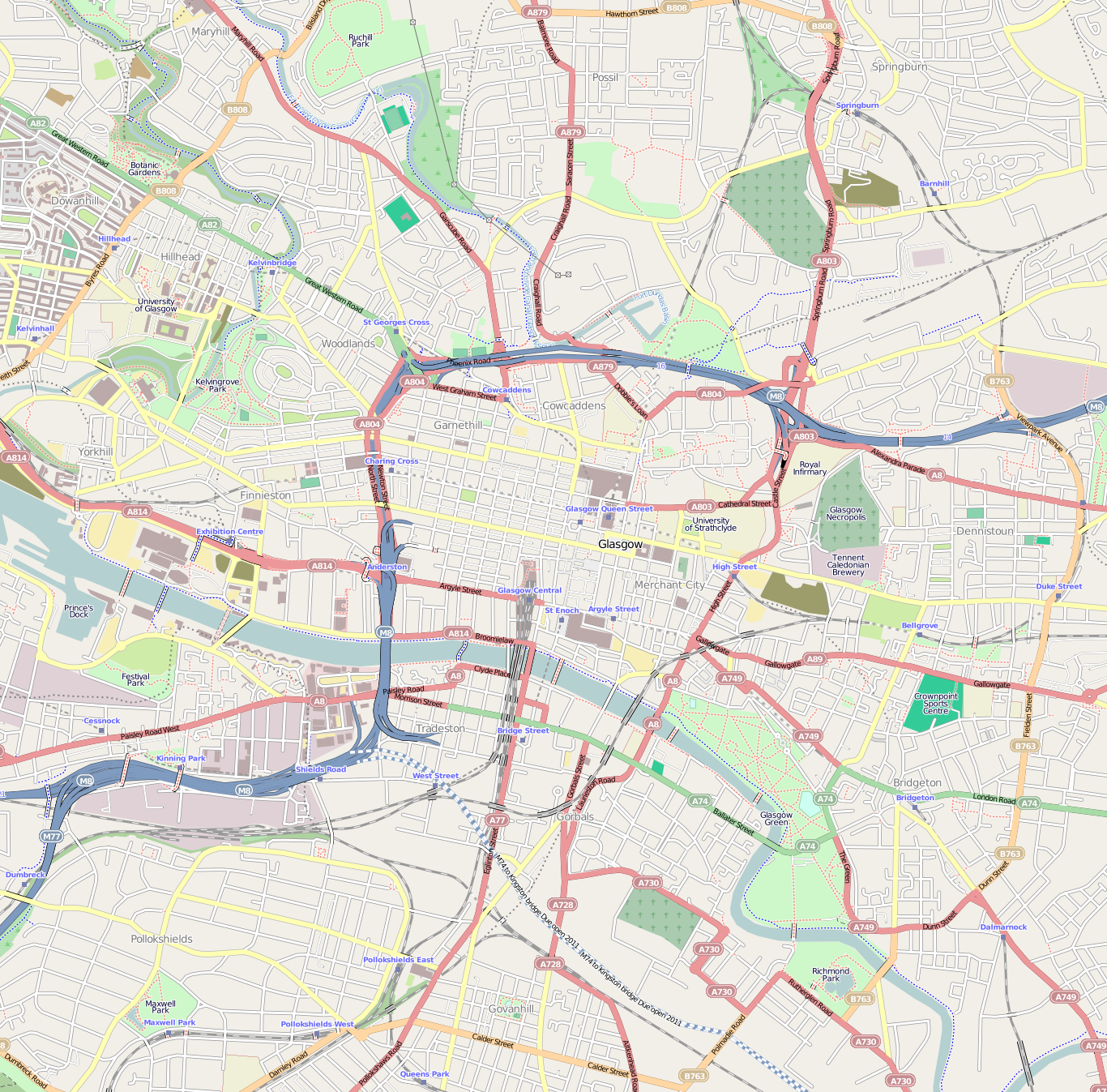
- Location in Glasgow
- Location: Bridgeton, Glasgow
- Country: Scotland
- Denomination: Roman Catholic
- Website: Sacred Heart Parish, Glasgow

History
- Status: Parish church
- Dedication: Sacred Heart
- Consecrated: 1973

Architecture
- Functional status: Active
- Heritage designation: Category A listed
- Designated: 15 December 1990
- Architect: Charles Ménart
- Style: Baroque Revival
- Groundbreaking: 1909; 117 years ago
- Completed: 1910; 116 years ago

Administration
- Province: Glasgow
- Archdiocese: Glasgow
- Deanery: City East

Clergy
- Archbishop: Most Reverend William Nolan
- Priest: Very Rev Peter Dowling SSS

The Sacred Heart Church is a Catholic parish church in the Bridgeton area of Glasgow, Scotland. The parish boundaries cover Bridgeton and Dalmarnock. It is situated on Old Dalmarnock Road. It is a category A listed building.

== History ==
The parish was founded in 1873 and originally had a temporary wooden church. The present church was built in 1909–10. The architect was Charles Ménart who also designed St Aloyisus’ church, Garnethill, Glasgow. The Presbytery (1890) was designed by Pugin and Pugin. Later alterations to the church (1953-4) were by Gillespie, Kidd & Coia including fresco restoration by William Crosbie. The style is Baroque Revival with predominantly rock-faced red ashlar. Brother Walfrid the Marist Brother was the first headmaster of the parish school - Sacred Heart School. Born Andrew Kerins in the village of Ballymote in County Sligo in Ireland, he joined the Marist order in his Twenties, moving to Scotland in 1870. It was here, in the East End of Glasgow, that he founded Celtic Football Club as a way of raising funds and helping feed the poor and impoverished in this part of the city notably in the poor children dinner tables in Savoy Street in the parish. The parish have rededicated one of their side chapels as “The Brother Walfrid Memorial Sacred Heart chapel” in honour of the first headmaster and founder of their school in 1974.

== Parish ==
The church has one Sunday Mass at 9:30am and is linked and shares a parish priest with St Michael’s Parish, Parkhead.

== Clergy ==
- Rev. Edward Noonan, 1872–86
- Rev. Francis J. Hughes, 1886–1904
- Very Rev. Michael Canon Hughes, 1904–21
- Rt. Rev. Mgr Anthony Provost Mullins, 1921–55
- Rt. Rev. Mgr Peter M. Canon Morrison OBE, 1955–67
- Rev. Denis Meechan,1967–74
- Rev. Daniel Moore, 1974–77
- Rev. Patrick J. Henry, 1977–78
- Rev. Matthew Coakley, 1978–82
- Rev. Joseph Murphy VF, 1982–90
- Rev. Joseph Cairns, 1990–98
- Rev. John McGinley, 1998–2000
- Rev. Kevin Ryan S.X., 2000–2010
- Rev. Stephen Dunn, 2010–14
- Rt. Rev. Mgr Paul Canon Conroy VG, 2014–21
- Rev. Liam McMahon, 2021–24
- Very Rev Peter Dowling SSS, 2024–present

== See also ==
- Roman Catholic Archdiocese of Glasgow
