= Patrick Meehan =

Received a pardon after a murder conviction (1927–1994)

- Born: 12 April 1927
- Died: 14 August 1994 (aged 67)
- Known for: Royal pardon after miscarriage of justice

Patrick Connolly Meehan (12 April 1927 – 14 August 1994) was the victim of a controversial miscarriage of justice in Scotland. Although he died a natural death (of throat cancer in Swansea) a number of people involved in the case died violent deaths, in clashes between former associates among Glasgow criminals. Meehan came from Glasgow and was a "peter man", a safe-blower with convictions for bank robbery.

In 1969, Rachael Ross was murdered during a robbery at her bungalow in Ayr by two men. Her husband (Abraham Ross) survived the robbery, and he reported that the robbers had addressed each other as "Pat" and "Jim". Police suspected two known criminals, Meehan and James Griffiths, who had been in the area. Griffiths panicked when the police tried to arrest him, and he went on a gun-toting rampage across Glasgow. He was shot dead by police, but only after he shot and injured several passers-by, one of whom later died. Meehan was arrested more peacefully and charged with the murder of Mrs. Ross. His solicitor was Joseph Beltrami, and his advocates were Nicholas Fairbairn and John Smith, who both later became high-ranking politicians.

At his trial, he submitted a defence of incrimination, claiming that the murder was committed by another man, Ian Waddell, but was found guilty. His conviction proved controversial and there was a campaign for his release which included Fairbairn and Ludovic Kennedy.

After the trial, Waddell made a number of statements to journalists that he had committed the murder. Meehan spent several years in prison, but was eventually released and given a royal pardon in mid-1976.

Later that year, Waddell was put on trial for the murder of Rachael Ross. At his trial he submitted a defence of incrimination, claiming that the murder was committed by Meehan. This trial, and particularly the judge's summing-up, in which he advised the jury that, despite the royal pardon intending that the conviction and all its consequences are wiped out and that persons who receive free pardons are to be regarded as being in the position of having been acquitted at trial, it was his opinion that the original conviction still stood, that the Queen had simply released Meehan from serving his still-standing conviction, and thus Waddell could not be found guilty of a crime for which Meehan was still guilty of; Waddell was acquitted by the jury in December 1976. Shortly after Bruce Millan, Secretary of State for Scotland, commented in the House of Commons about these issues.

Waddell later murdered another woman during a robbery; his criminal anssociate in this murder, Andrew Gentle, murdered Waddell soon after. Gentle was convicted of both murders and later committed suicide in prison.

An inquiry into the miscarriage of justice, held due to public demand, and chaired by Lord Hunter, reported in 1982. This agreed with the judge in Waddell's 1976 acquittal that, despite a pardon, Meehan's guilt was not "disproved", while also concluding that there was no evidence of the police fabricating evidence as claimed. It was widely criticised as a whitewash.

In view of information which has come to light since then, it is now generally accepted that the murder of Rachael Ross was committed by Waddell and William "Tank" McGuiness, another man who was also murdered in 1976, apparently in a drunken street brawl. One crucial aspect of the case was that Beltrami knew that McGuiness had committed the murder of Mrs. Ross since he had told him under client confidentiality, but he was unable to reveal this; he was only able to do so after McGuiness was dead. (The last person to be seen with McGuiness while alive, John Winning, was charged with his murder, but the case against him collapsed because of insufficient evidence. Winning was also later murdered.)

In later years, Meehan put forward elaborate claims that he was framed by intelligence services due to issues concerning the escape of George Blake. After his death, some elements of his life story were adapted and used by the author Denise Mina (a casual acquaintance) in her 2005 novel The Field of Blood, with the main character a female journalist bearing his name.
