= Springburn Park =

Park in Glasgow, Scotland

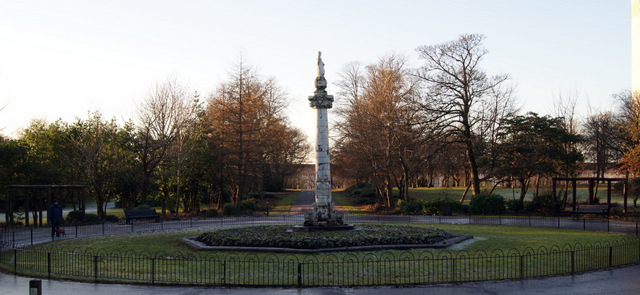
- Interactive map of Springburn Park
- Type: Public park
- Location: Glasgow, Scotland
- Coordinates: 55.889028°N 4.226972°W
- Area: 31 hectares (77 acres)
- Operator: Glasgow City Council
- Open: Open all year
- Public transit: Springburn

Springburn Park is a park situated in the north of the city of Glasgow, Scotland. The 31-hectare (77-acre) park lies about 2 4/5 miles (5 km) north of the city centre, and takes its name from the surrounding Springburn district of the city.

== History ==
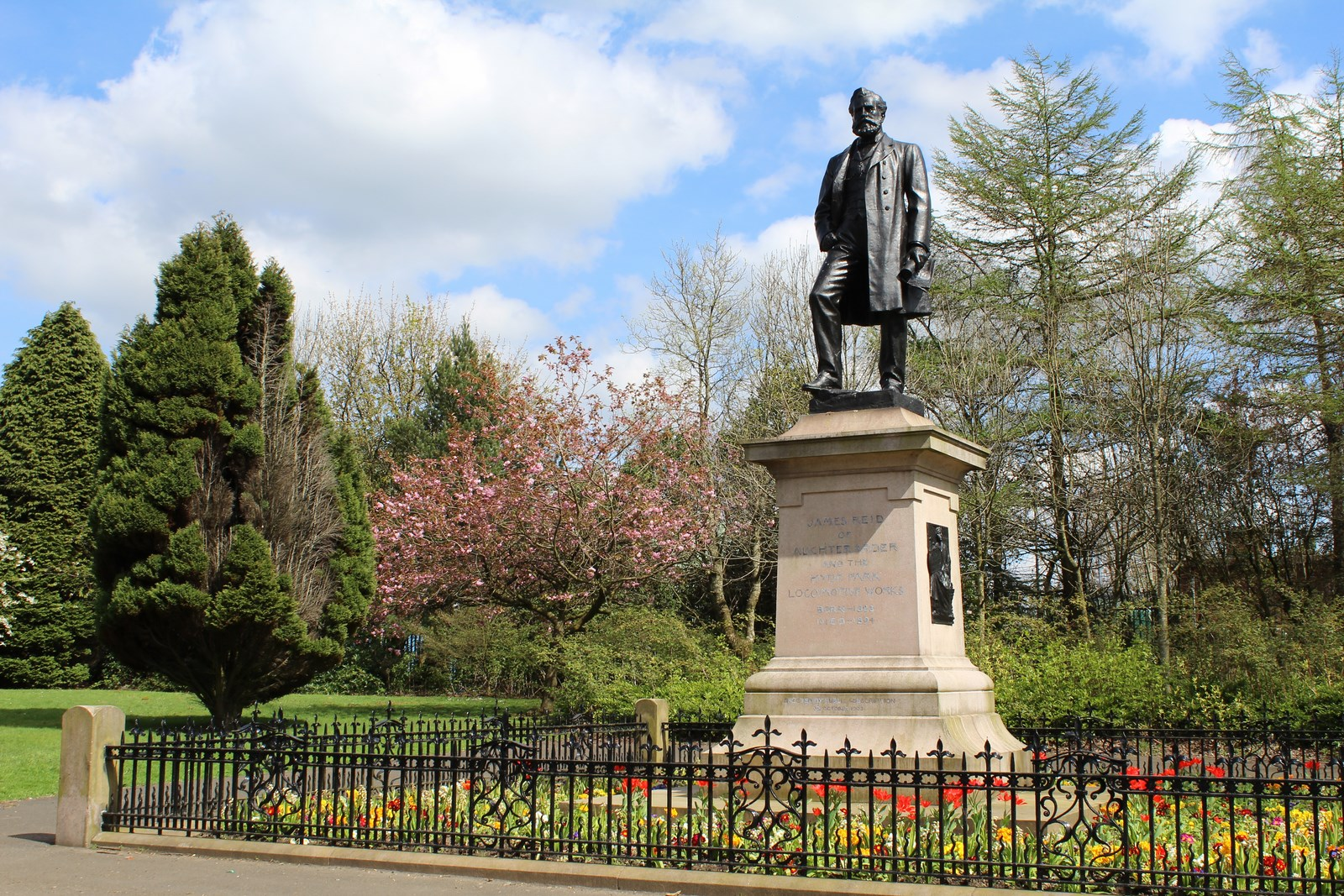
Statue of James Reid in Springburn Park

Situated on Balgrayhill, 364 feet (111 metres) above sea level, it is located at the highest point in the north of Glasgow. Springburn Park was opened by Glasgow Corporation in 1892 and laid out to a design by the City Engineer, A. B. McDonald. James Reid, a business partner of locomotive manufacturer Walter Neilson, donated a bandstand, built by the Saracen Foundry, to the park in 1893. His son, Sir Hugh Reid of Neilson, Reid and Company's Hyde Park Works, also donated the lands of the adjacent Cockmuir Farm for the park to be extended to the east in 1900. It was at this time that the Reid family funded the construction of the spectacular Springburn Winter Gardens, a £12,000 gift from Hugh Reid of the Hyde Park Works, as part of an arrangement for Glasgow Corporation to build Springburn Public Halls, which opened in 1902 (this hall was later demolished in 2012, despite local opposition). The Winter Gardens building has lain derelict since Glasgow District Council applied to demolish the structure in 1985, due to rising maintenance costs. The largest structure of its kind in Scotland, it is approximately 180 feet (55 metres) long and 9,060 sq ft (840 m^{2}) in area. A statue in honour of James Reid was erected in the park by public subscription in 1903; it is now Category B listed, as is the bleached terracotta column and unicorn nearby.

Stobhill Hospital was later built adjacent to the park in 1904. Mosesfield House, situated in the park, was also the site where George Johnston built Britain's first Motor Car in 1895, which eventually grew to become the Arrol-Johnston company.
