= Springburn Winter Gardens =

Coordinates: 55°53′20.5″N 4°13′37.1″W

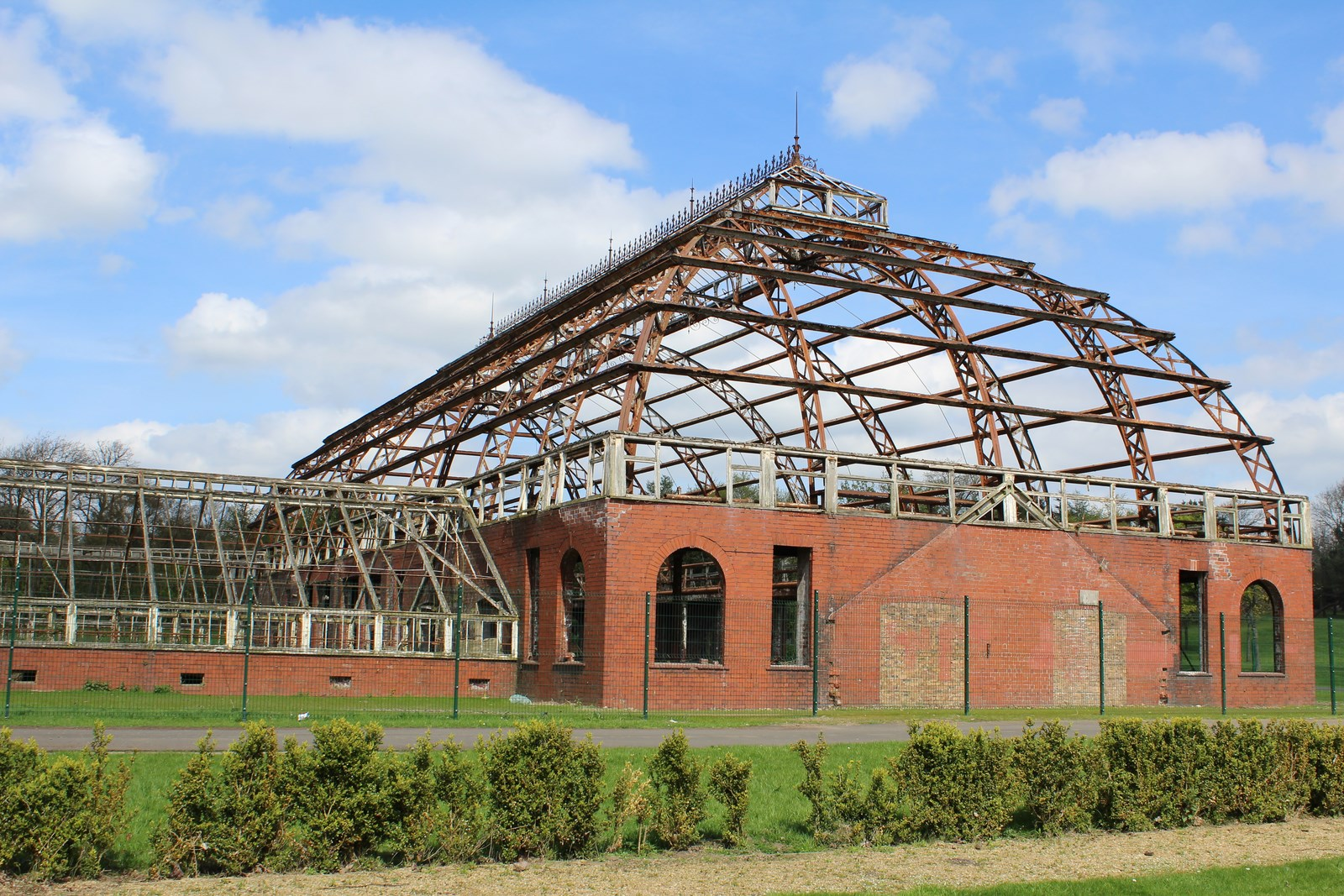
- The derelict Winter Gardens in Springburn Park, 2014
- Interactive map of the Springburn Winter Gardens area

General information
- Type: Winter garden
- Architectural style: Victorian
- Location: Springburn Park; G21 3AZ, Glasgow, Scotland
- Construction started: 1899
- Completed: 1900
- Closed: 1983
- Owner: Glasgow City Council

Design and construction
- Architects: Simpson & Farmer
- Main contractor: Simpson & Farmer

Other information
- Public transit access: Springburn

Listed Building – Category A
- Designated: 22 March 1985
- Reference no.: LB33298

The Springburn Winter Gardens is a former large winter garden located at Springburn Park in the Springburn district of the Scottish city of Glasgow, constructed in 1900. The building was damaged in a storm and fell out of use in 1983 but was saved from planned demolition on 22 March 1985, when the Scottish Office included the structure on the Statutory List of Buildings of Special Architectural or Historic Interest, at category A.

== History ==
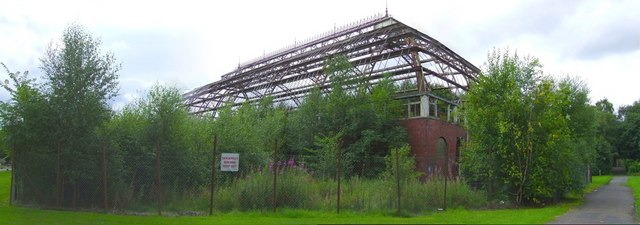
Pictured in 2008, the structure was inundated with plant and tree growth prior to clearance works undertaken by Springburn Winter Gardens Trust in recent years

Springburn Park was opened by Glasgow Corporation in 1892 and laid out to a design by the City Engineer, A. B. McDonald.

The local Reid family owned the nearby Hyde Park Locomotive Works and lived in a large mansion, Belmont House, located at the north side of the park. The family gifted a bandstand, built by the Saracen Foundry, to the park in 1893 and also donated £12,000 to build Springburn Public Halls. The condition was that the Glasgow Corporation should pay for a winter garden in the park. Nevertheless, the family also made £10,000 available for the construction of the glasshouse by the company Simpson & Farmer of Partick between 1899 and 1900. The steel used came from the Temple Ironworks at Anniesland and Glengarnock Steelworks.

Today the building is only preserved as a ruin. To prevent a planned demolition of the building by Glasgow District Council in 1985, the building was granted listed status by the Scottish Office two days before the planning committee was due to consider the demolition application. In 1990 the structure was placed on the Buildings at Risk Register for Scotland. Despite various proposals for restoration, no subsequent use has been found for decades. In 2014 the condition of the winter garden was classified as a ruin at critical risk.

=== Restoration ===
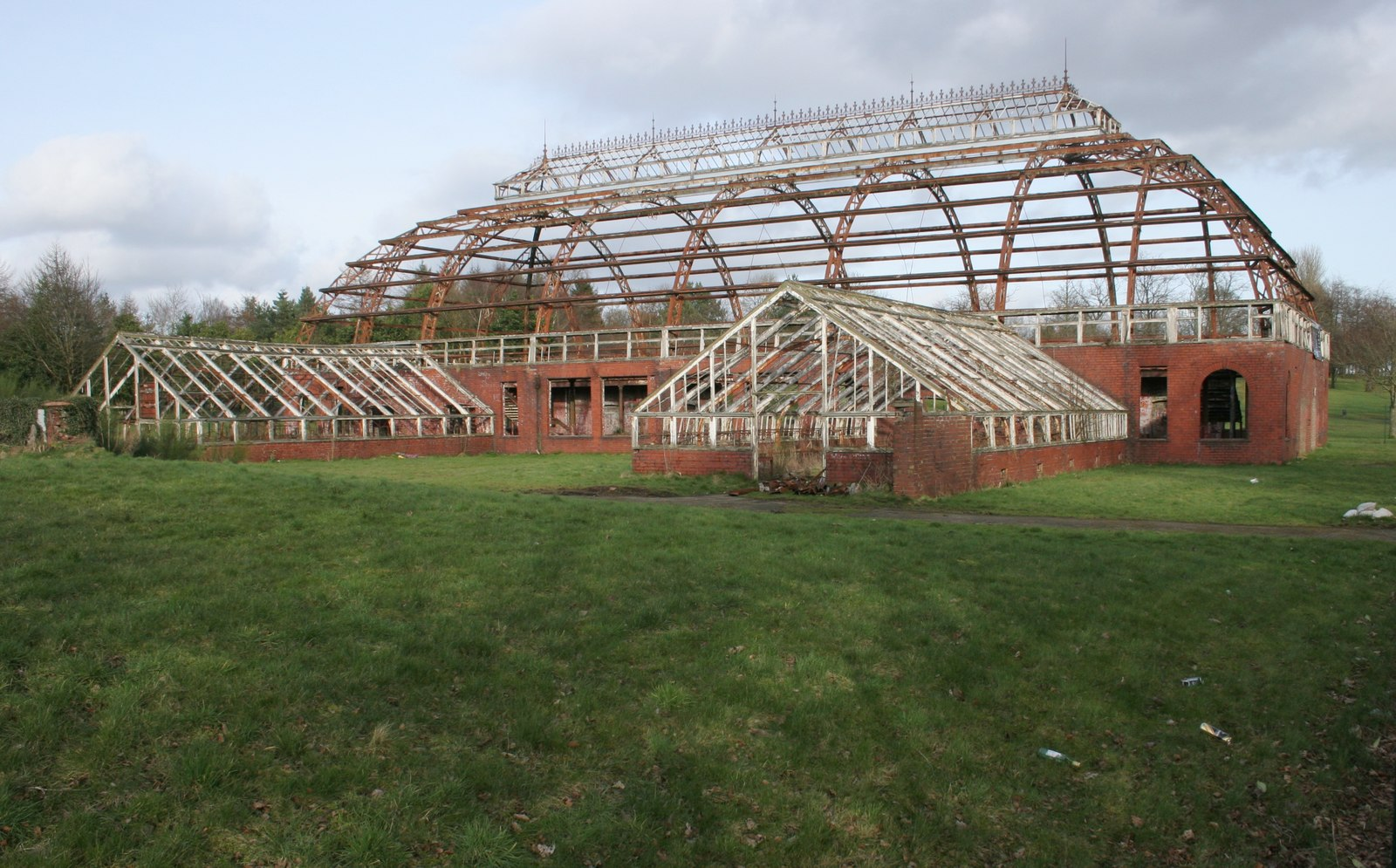
The west side of Springburn Winter Gardens in 2017, showing the two wing greenhouses. Similar structures on the east side of the building were demolished in the mid-1980s.

After local community activists campaigned against the demolition of Springburn Public Halls in 2012, the Springburn Winter Gardens Trust was founded as a registered Scottish Charitable Incorporated Organisation in 2013, and has progressively worked towards a restoration plan for the building. Founding trustees included local politicians Paul Sweeney and Patricia Ferguson. An emergency repairs programme to save the building from collapse was undertaken during 2017. An £8 million restoration programme by Collective Architecture to convert the building into a major events and performance venue was unveiled by the Trust in October 2020.

== Description ==
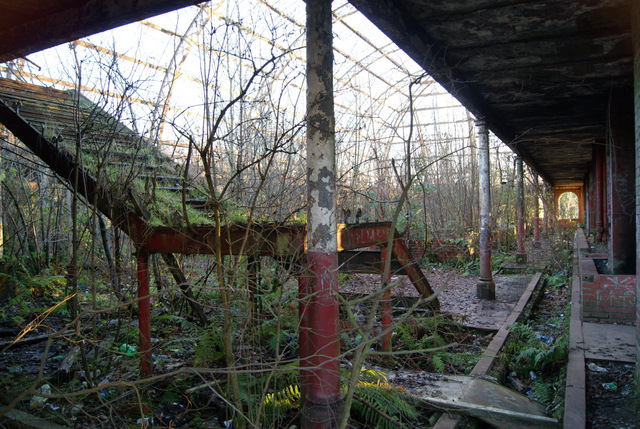
The interior of Springburn Winter Gardens in 2012, showing the main hall and gallery

The structure is located in the southwest of Springburn Park. Seven steel lattice arches form the supporting structure. They rest on a 3.6m high red brick wall. The rounded edges with formerly overlapping glass elements were added later. Two greenhouse wings are accessed via a cast iron staircase with a cast iron balustrade. The largest structure of its kind in Scotland, it is approximately 180 feet (55 metres) long and 9,060 sq ft (840 m^{2}) in area. It is one of five large glasshouse or conservatory structures in Glasgow, along with those at the Glasgow Botanic Gardens, People's Palace on Glasgow Green, Queen's Park and Tollcross Park. Cuningham House, the main glasshouse in Christchurch Botanic Gardens is a replica of Springburn Winter Gardens, built in 1923.
