= Joe Beltrami =

Scottish lawyer

- Born: 15 May 1932; Glasgow, Scotland
- Died: 24 February 2015 (aged 82)
- Other name: Joe Beltrami
- Education: St Aloysius' College, Glasgow, University of Glasgow
- Occupation: Lawyer
- Title: Advocate

Joseph Beltrami (15 May 1932 – 24 February 2015) was a Scottish lawyer of Italian-Swiss descent. He is acknowledged as one of the foremost criminal solicitors in Scottish legal history.

== Early life and family ==
Beltrami was born in Rutherglen, Lanarkshire on 15 May 1932. His father, Egidio Beltrami, was an Italian-Swiss man who had moved to Scotland to open a fish and chip shop; his mother, Isabella, was Scottish. Beltrami was brought up in Glasgow and educated at St. Aloysius' College. He graduated the University of Glasgow in 1953 having studied Law.

He struggled to find an apprenticeship at a legal firm, due to his Roman Catholic heritage, so after a period in the Intelligence Corps for his national service in the 1950s, he set up his own firm Beltrami & Co.

Beltrami married nurse Brigid Delores Fallon on 14 January 1958 at St Andrew's Cathedral, Glasgow, and the couple had three sons who each went on to become lawyers. As of 2015, Edwin was the Chief Crown Prosecutor for the Crown Prosecution Service in Wales, Adrian was a KC specialising in commercial litigation, and Jason was a lawyer in Glasgow. Joe Beltrami died, aged 82, on 23 February 2015.

== Career ==
Beltrami was involved in several high-profile cases, including the campaign for the release of Patrick Meehan. He defended such names as Johnny Ramensky, Colin Beattie and gained the first ever Royal Pardon issued in Scotland defending Maurice Swanson.

Beltrami's most famous "client" was Hercules, a trained grizzly bear, who featured in Octopussy. The bear disappeared during filming of a Kleenex tissue advert on Benbecula, and was missing for over three weeks. His owner, Andy Robin, was prosecuted for failing to control a wild animal, but Beltrami successfully defended the man on the basis that Hercules was not wild as he was a "working bear".

He successfully defended Glasgow crime figure Arthur Thompson on many occasions throughout the 1980s, leading to the phrase "get me Beltrami" being coined as a plea for help in desperate circumstances amongst Glaswegians during the time.

Before the abolition of the death penalty in 1965, Beltrami successfully defended in 12 capital murder cases, with all 12 of his clients not having to trouble the hangman.

== Works ==
- The Defender: Joseph Beltrami, Famous Cases of the Celebrated Criminal Lawyer. (1980) ISBN 978-0550203540
- The Defender: Tales of the Suspected (1988) ISBN 978-0951396308
- A Deadly Innocence: The Meechan Files (1989) ISBN 978-1851582976

== Honours and Recognitions ==
- 1953 - Bachelor of Laws (LLB), University of Glasgow, Scotland
- 2009 - Honorary Life Membership of the Law Society of Scotland
