= Patrick J. O'Donnell =

Scottish academic (1947-2016)

Patrick O'Donnell
- Born: Patrick O'Donnell; 12 July 1947; Govan, Glasgow, Scotland
- Died: 9 April 2016 (aged 68); Glasgow, Scotland
- Spouse: Mary O'Donnell
- Children: 1

Academic background
- Education: University of Glasgow

Academic work
- Discipline: Psychology
- Institutions: University of Glasgow

Patrick J. O'Donnell (12 July 1947 - 9 April 2016) was a Scottish academic and professor of psychology at the University of Glasgow. He was renown throughout the university and the wide community for his wit and enthusiasm in his teaching.

== Career ==
O'Donnell was born in Govan, Glasgow and attended Holy Cross Primary School and then St Aloysius College where he was Head Boy and Dux. He proceeded to the University of Glasgow. After graduating with a First in psychology he was appointed as an assistant lecturer in 1969. He was quickly promoted to lecturer and rapidly rose up the ranks. He was appointed as Dean of Social Sciences in 1983 and was promoted to senior lecturer in 1987. He was Head of Department in Psychology for 11 years and subsequently, Deputy Head of School until his retirement in 2015. He was promoted to Professor of Teaching, Learning and Assessment in 2006.

He had a strong reputation for his teaching. He taught at the School of Psychology for more than 45 years, teaching circa 25,000 students. He had a reputation among students who created a Facebook page called “The Legend that is Paddy O’Donnell.”

His research was wide-ranging and included work on computer interfaces, addiction, therapeutic treatments, and decision-making in accounting. He was frequently consulted by the media.

He was also involved in the UCU.

== Personal life ==
He is survived by his wife and daughter. He died at home in Glasgow after a year-long illness.
