= St Aloysius Church, Glasgow =

Coordinates: 55.8665°N 4.2618°W

St Aloysius Church
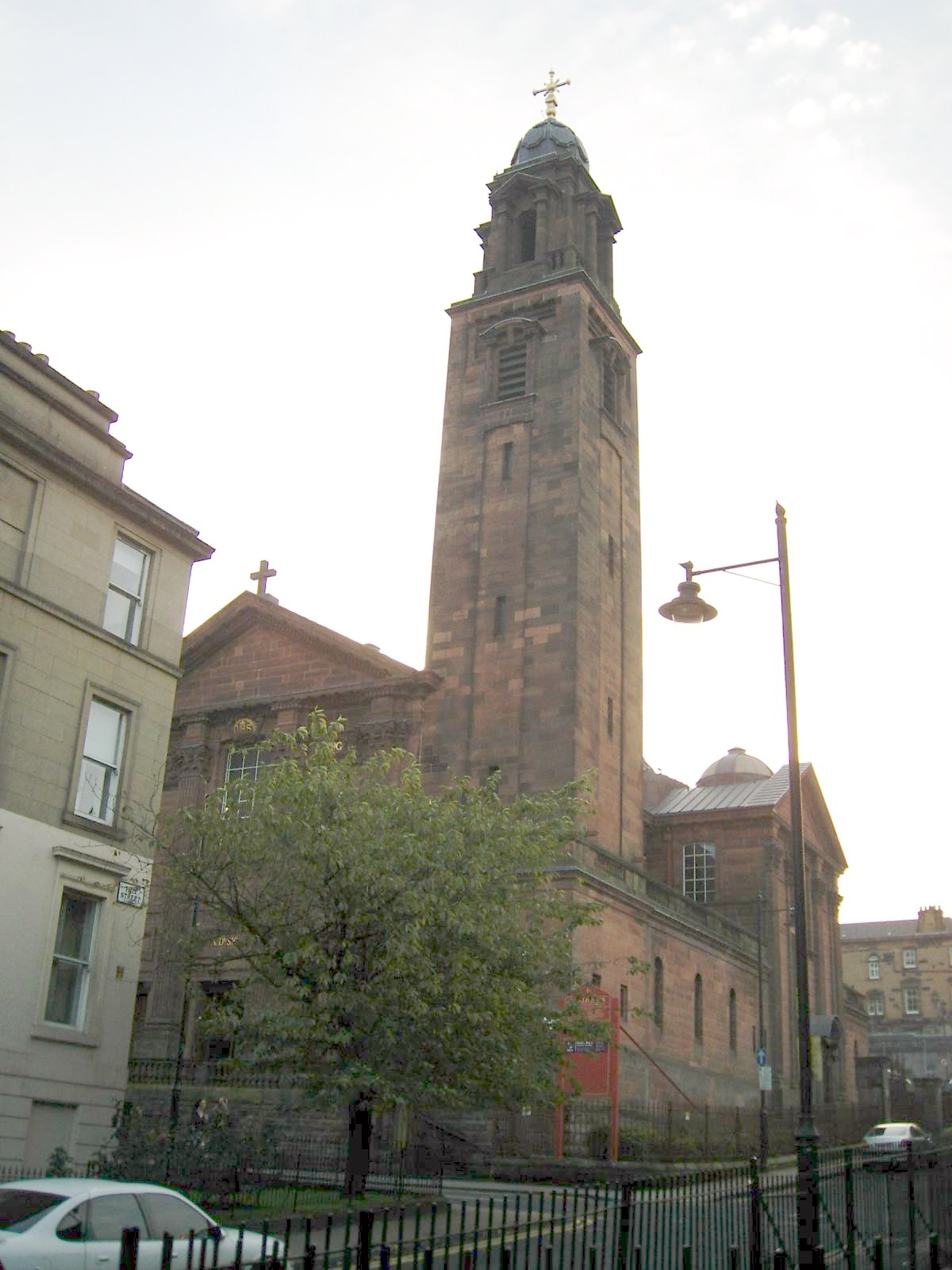
- View of church along Hill Street

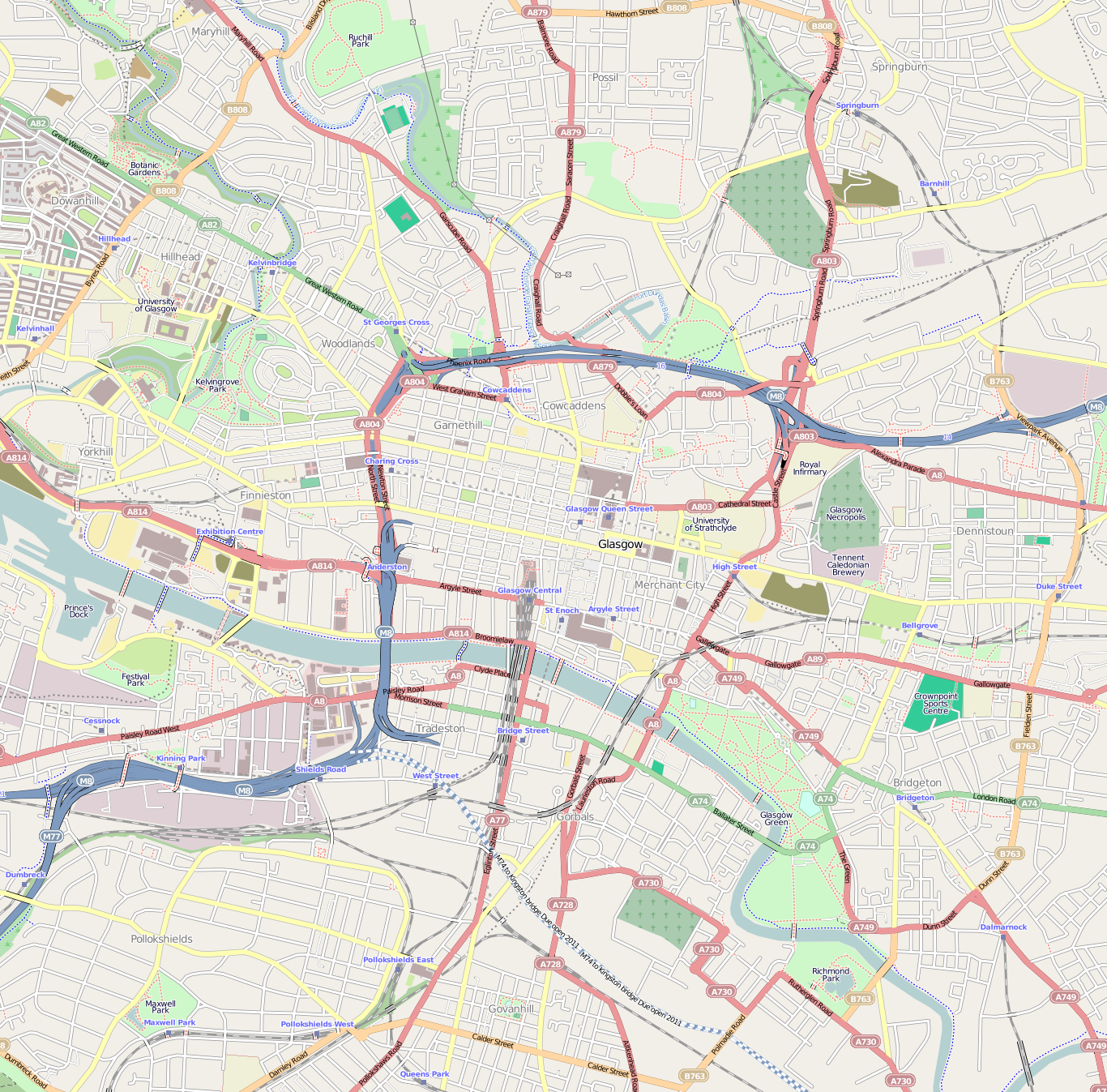
- Location of church within Glasgow
- OS grid reference: NS586660
- Location: Glasgow
- Country: Scotland
- Denomination: Roman Catholic
- Website: St Aloysius Parish, Glasgow

History
- Status: Active
- Founded: 1868
- Founder: Fr William Kay SJ
- Dedication: St Aloysius Gonzaga
- Consecrated: 29 November 1953

Architecture
- Functional status: Parish Church
- Heritage designation: Category A
- Designated: 15 December 1950
- Architect: Charles Menart
- Style: Baroque Revival
- Groundbreaking: 4 October 1908
- Completed: 6 February 1910

Specifications
- Capacity: 800
- Length: 150 ft (46 m)
- Width: 90 ft (27 m)
- Height: 60 ft (18 m)

Administration
- Province: Glasgow
- Archdiocese: Glasgow
- Deanery: West End

Clergy
- Archbishop: William Nolan
- Priest: Fr Gerard Mitchell SJ

St Aloysius Church is a Roman Catholic parish church in the Garnethill area of Glasgow in Scotland. It is the only church in Glasgow to be run by the Society of Jesus. It is situated on the corner of Hill Street and Rose Street and is next door to St Aloysius' College, Glasgow, having a close relationship with the school. When it was built, it was the only Catholic church in Glasgow to have a tower. It is modelled on Namur Cathedral in Belgium and is a Category A listed building.

== History ==
=== Founding ===
The Jesuits arrived in Glasgow in 1859 by taking over the parish of St Joseph's Church, North Woodside Road. In the early 1860s they purchased land in the Garnethill district, which, at that time, was on the western outskirts of the city and a residential area recently favoured by the wealthier classes.

In 1868, Fr William Kay SJ arrived at Garnethill with instructions to found a mission at St Aloysius which would be distinct from St Joseph's. He quickly set about constructing a large building on Hill Street. This building was made of iron and glass, very similar to Glasgow Queen Street station, was known as 'Fr Kay's Railway Shed'. This building served as the parish church for the next forty years.

The Sisters of Mercy came to Garnethill in 1868 at the invitation of the Jesuits and rented from them two houses in Rose Street, the area now occupied by the church. However, a shortage of staff meant that the sisters could not work at the college next door, but they were able to continue to work in the primary school next to St. Joseph's church, which was a Jesuit parish until 1931 and closed in the 1970s.

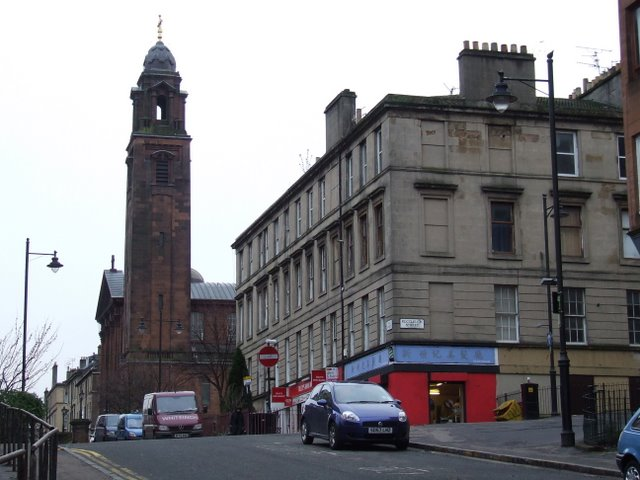
View along Rose Street

=== Construction ===
The foundation stone for the present church building was laid on 4 October 1908 and it was opened on 6 February 1910, by the Archbishop of Glasgow, John Maguire. The building is listed category A and was designed by a Belgian architect, Charles Jean Ménart in the baroque revival style. Ménart also designed St Peter's Church in Rathven. The church was unique amongst the Catholic churches of Glasgow in that it had a tower and is modelled on Namur Cathedral in Belgium and the Gesu in Rome.

The two bells in the church tower were installed in 1910. They were originally part of a set of 10 bells that were placed in St Giles' Cathedral in Edinburgh in 1865. In 1890, St Giles' Cathedral sold the set to St Mary's Cathedral in Edinburgh for £20. At the time, St Mary's Cathedral was trying to raise money to build a tower to house the bells. In 1910, after the fundraising was unsuccessful, the set of bells were divided up and given to other churches, two of which went to St Aloysius church.

Inside the church are four side chapels, The Sacred Heart Chapel, the Lady Chapel, the Holy Souls Chapel, the St Ignatius Chapel and in addition there is the St John Ogilvie national shrine, which was added in 1933 to mark John Ogilvie's beatification which had taken place in 1929.

The interior decoration of the church was a prolonged and costly enterprise and the debt increased alarmingly so that the prospect of the solemn consecration receded. It was not until after the Second World War that debt was steadily reduced and finally cleared. On 29 November 1953 Archbishop Donald Campbell presided at the solemn ceremony of consecration.

=== The Black Madonna ===
In February 2008, a copy of the famous statue of Our Lady of Montserrat, also known as The Black Madonna, was donated to the church, situated in the Lady Chapel, by visitors from Spain and is only the second of such statues outside Catalonia.

== Parish ==
The church enjoys a close relationship with St Aloysius' College next door. The church is regularly used by the college; its assemblies are held in the church twice a week because of the church's large capacity. Also, masses are regularly offered in the church for both the junior and senior schools.

Connected to the church is the Ogilvie centre, this hosts various parish related groups, such as the local Christian Life Community association and social justice group.

In addition, there is the nearby Ignatian Spirituality centre, 35, Scott Street, which is situated in the same building as the local Jesuit community. It was originally the Craighead Jesuit Spirituality Centre and was in Hamilton. It was moved to Glasgow in the late 20th century and was renamed the Ignatian Spirituality Centre. The centre offers one-to-one spiritual accompaniment and a varied programme of non-residential courses, events and retreats grounded in Ignatian spirituality to the surrounding area. The centre is staffed by a diverse team of Jesuits, lay people and members of other Catholic religious orders and other Christian denominations.

== Interior ==
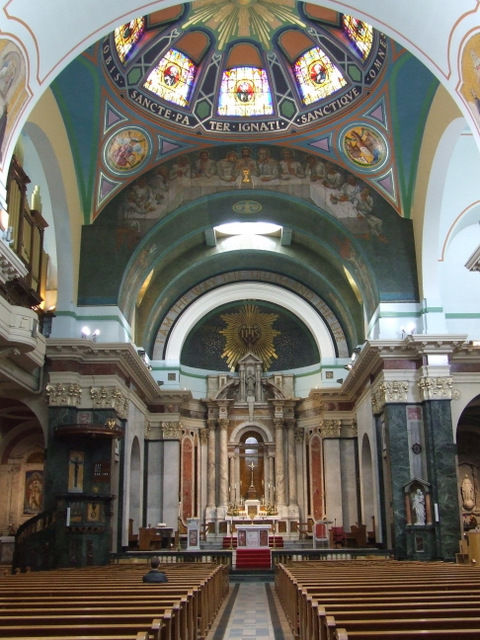
Interior

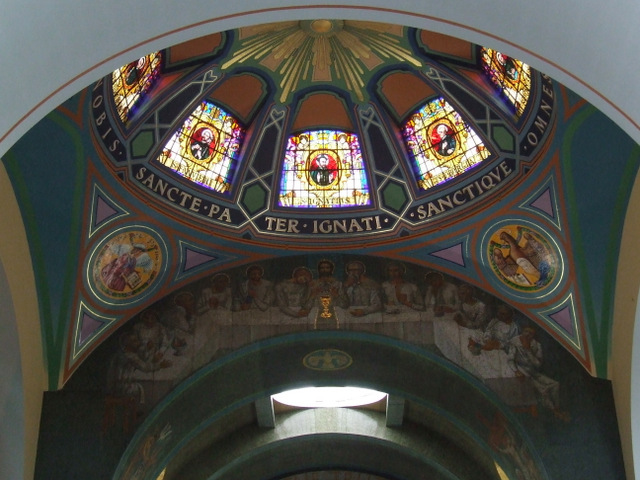
View of the dome interior

== See also ==
- List of Jesuit sites
- St Aloysius' College, Glasgow
- Ignatian spirituality
