= Charitable incorporated organisation =

Legal entity in the United Kingdom

A charitable incorporated organisation (CIO) is a corporate form of business designed for (and only available to) charitable organisations in England and Wales. A similar form, with minor differences, exists for Scottish charities.

== Overview ==
A CIO comes into being (is "constituted") once it is registered as such by the Charity Commission for England and Wales (the Charity Commission). The application is by the proposed members of the CIO. Usually these are also the proposed trustees, but this is not a requirement.

The main benefits of the CIO form are that the charity is a corporation with legal personality (the ability to enter contracts, sue and be sued, and to hold property in its own name – rather than in the name of its trustees), and its members have limited liability (their liability in the event the charity becomes insolvent is limited or nil).

Historically these benefits were only available to limited companies, and thus many charities chose to incorporate as charitable companies limited by guarantee. However, this requires registration and filing with both Companies House and the Charity Commission, each of which has its own regulations and requirements. In contrast, a CIO only needs to register and file accounts and returns with the Charity Commission. This aims to reduce bureaucracy for the charity.

In addition, (and uniquely among limited liability corporations in the UK), smaller CIOs in England and Wales can opt to file receipts and payments accounts, rather than the accruals accounts usually required. But one disadvantage of the form for larger charities is that, unlike for charitable companies, there is no public register of lenders' charges over the corporation's assets, and this can make it harder to arrange finance. A CIO is also unable to grant a floating charge over its assets.

Almost any existing charity, including charitable companies, can apply to "convert" to a CIO. Strictly speaking the CIO is a new entity, and there is no continuity of legal personality with the former charity. (Despite a natural reading of Chapter Four of the Charities Act 2011, this is true even where the precursor charity is a charitable company.) This can have profound effects on the continuity of business, and can be a disincentive to conversion.

There is currently no means of converting a CIO to any other legal form – although it could be wound up and its assets transferred.

== History ==
The CIO status became available to charities in England and Wales on 4 March 2013, based on The Charities Act 2011. In Scotland, the Office of the Scottish Charity Regulator began registering Scottish charitable incorporated organisations (SCIOs) in April 2011.

The idea originated in 1992 with the Chief Executive of the National Council for Voluntary Organisations (NCVO), Judy Weleminsky, and was taken forward by Lindsay Driscoll who was the Head of Legal and Governance at NCVO. A Charity Commission advisory group was set up in 2000 to look at the incorporation of charities, and recommended a new form of legal entity. In 2001 the Department of Trade and Industry's company law review steering group likewise recommended a charitable incorporated organisation with a separate legal regime, as company law is aimed at the commercial sector, with corporate governance structured around the assumption that members of a company have a financial interest in it.

Primary legislation to introduce the CIO as a new legal form of incorporation was included in the Charities Bill in 2004, and this aspect of the bill was particularly welcomed by charities. It was finally enacted in the Charities Act 2006.

The Charity Commission opened a consultation on draft documentation and regulations in 2008, raising a large number of difficulties and suggested improvements.

Implementation in England and Wales has been phased, starting in 2013 with brand new charities, followed by conversions of existing unincorporated charities according to income, and then followed by charitable companies.

The Charity Commission in England and Wales began publishing guidance in May 2011. On 4 March 2013, for the first time, the Commission enabled an existing charity, Challenge to Change, to convert from a charitable trust to a CIO. The charity later reported some difficulties in transferring assets and long-term grant agreements to the new legal entity and subsequently closed due to reduced levels of funding. Another charity converted but then reverted to its old status because of the cost and inconvenience of changing its registration number. As of May 2019, there were over 17,000 CIOs registered with the Charity Commission for England and Wales.

== See also ==
- Community interest company (CIC)
- Community benefit society (BenComm)
