= Charles Ménart =

Belgian architect

Charles Jean Ménart (1876 – 7 April 1956) was a Belgian architect who worked in Scotland in the early 20th century and specialised in designing Roman Catholic churches in the Baroque Revival style.

== Early life ==
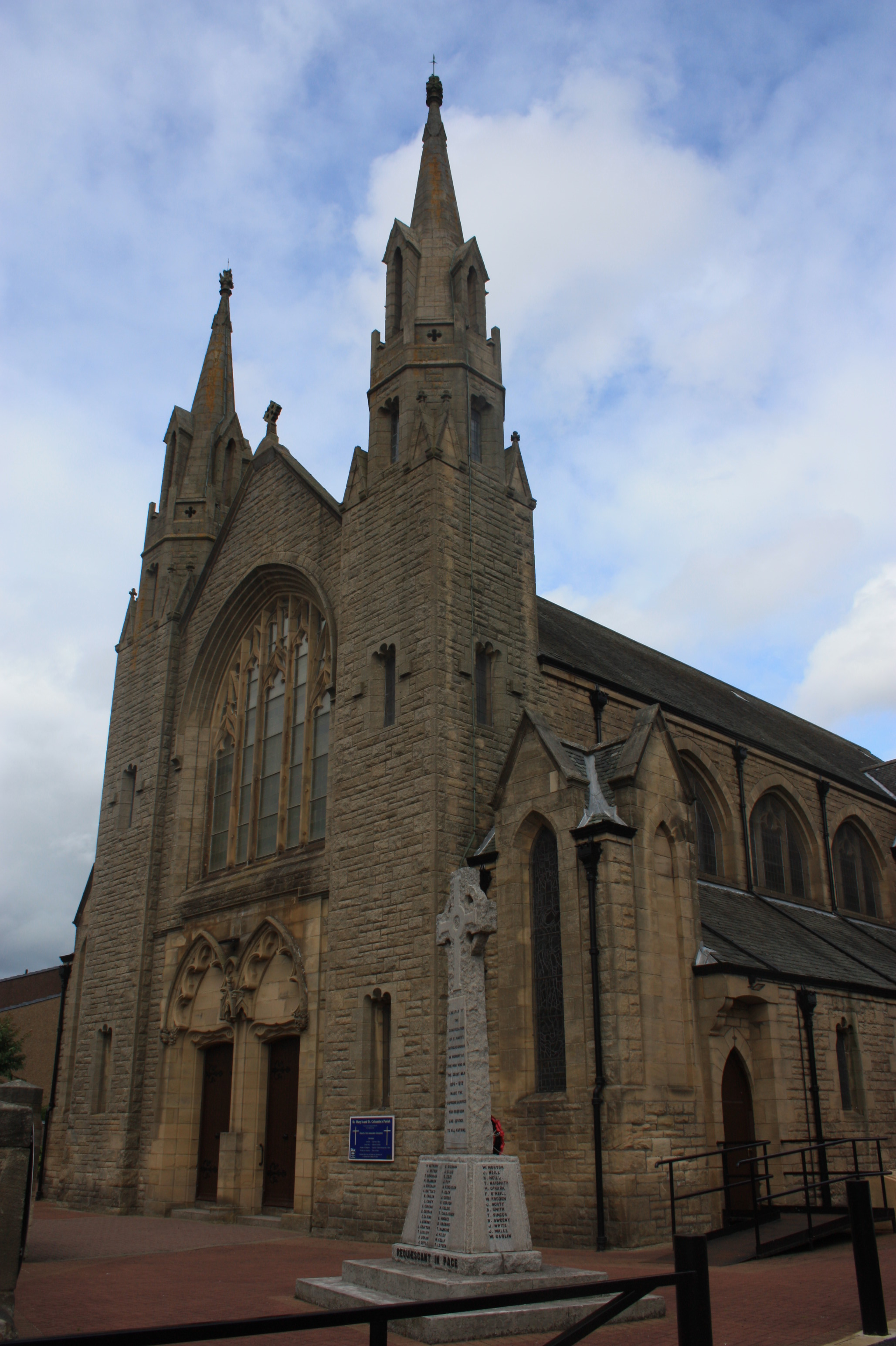
St Mary's Church, Bathgate by Charles Menart

He was born in Leuze-en-Hainaut, Belgium, to Émile-Jean Ménart, who was from France, and Agnes Joseph Meurisse. around 1876 and went on to study at the Glasgow School of Art from 1893 to 1898. He became a British citizen in 1897. He later settled in Perth. However, in 1903, he moved to Glasgow and went into partnership with John Stirling Jarvie from Perth, calling the business, Menart & Jarvie. Jarvie previously worked for John Archibald Campbell and John Burnet.

== Architect ==
On 16 December 1908, Ménart became a member of Glasgow Institute of Architects. From about 1907 onwards he did more and more work for the Archdiocese of Glasgow and the Diocese of Aberdeen, work that would normally have gone to Pugin & Pugin's. A lot of his work was in the Baroque Revival style, providing an alternative to the Gothic Revival architecture of some of his contemporaries.

He also produced secular buildings such as banks, tenements and shops; an example of this work being a development of a row of buildings from 10 to 12, the High Street, Perth, Scotland.

== Works ==
Some of his works include:

- St Leonard’s Manse, Perth (1905)
- St Peter's Church, Rathven (1907).
- Sacred Heart Church, Bridgeton (1900–1910)
- Remodelling of St Mary's Church, Bathgate (1908)
- St Aloysius Church, Glasgow, (1908–1910), based on St Aubin's Cathedral in Namur, Belgium.
- Interior of the Blairs College chapel, Aberdeen (1910–11)
- St Charles Borromeo, Gosforth, Newcastle upon Tyne (1910-11)
- Sacred Heart Church, Torry (1911)
- St Joseph’s Church, Helensburgh (1911)
- St Joseph's Church, Roystonhill (1910–1914)
- Dome and Interior of St Thomas's Church, Keith (1916)
- The chapel for St Joseph's College, Dumfries (1923).
- St Joseph's Church, Stranraer (1924) addition of tower and alterations.
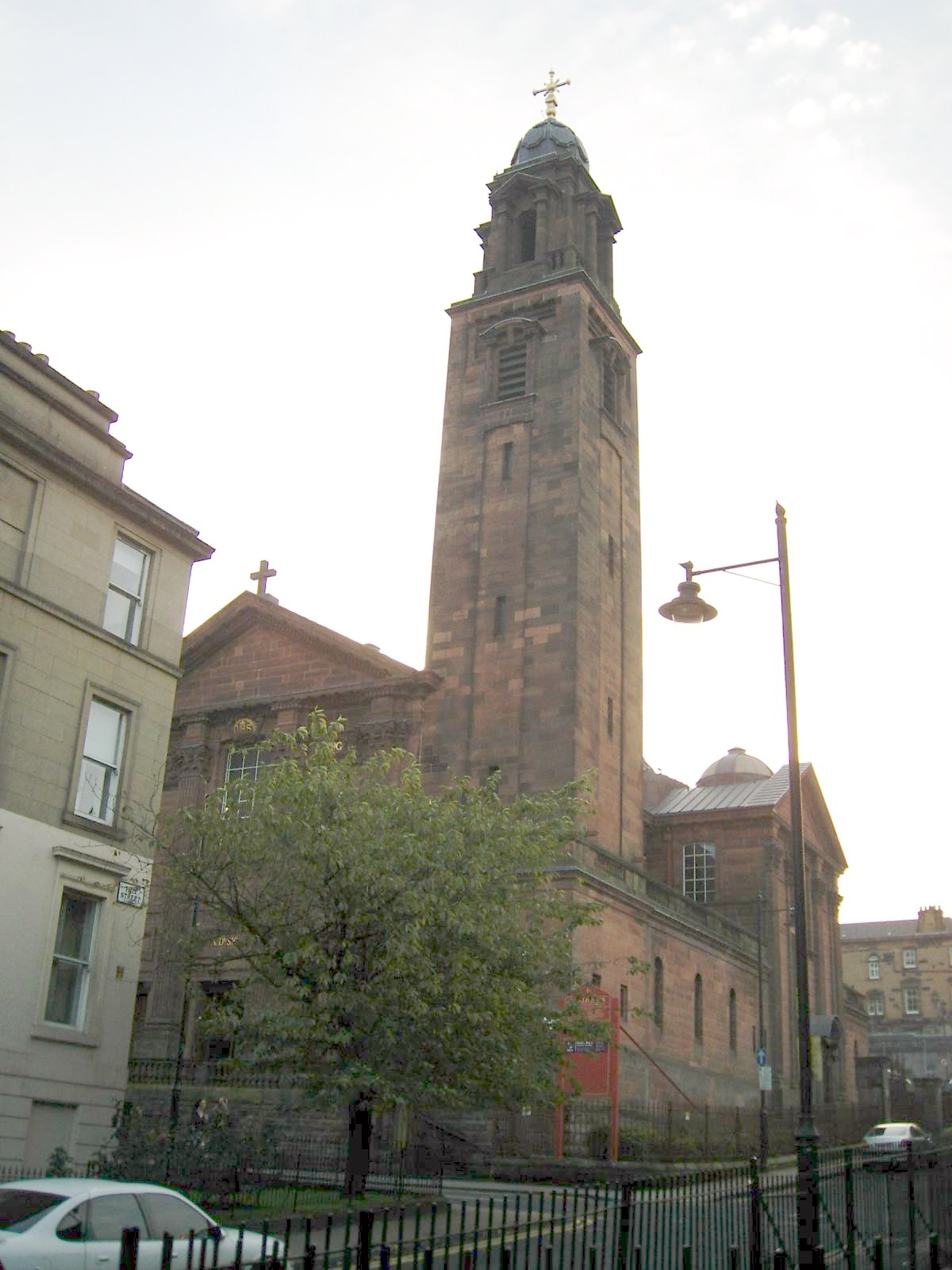
St Aloysius Church, Glasgow

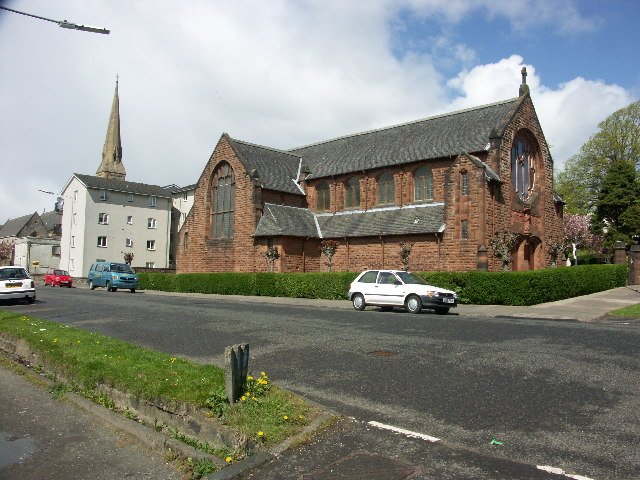
St Joseph’s Church, Helensburgh

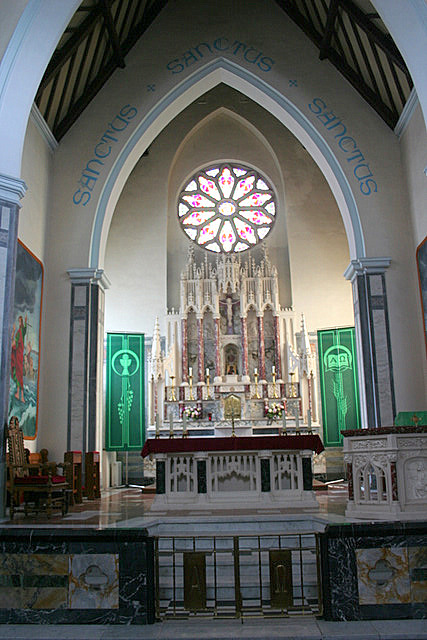
Interior of St Peter's Church, Rathven.

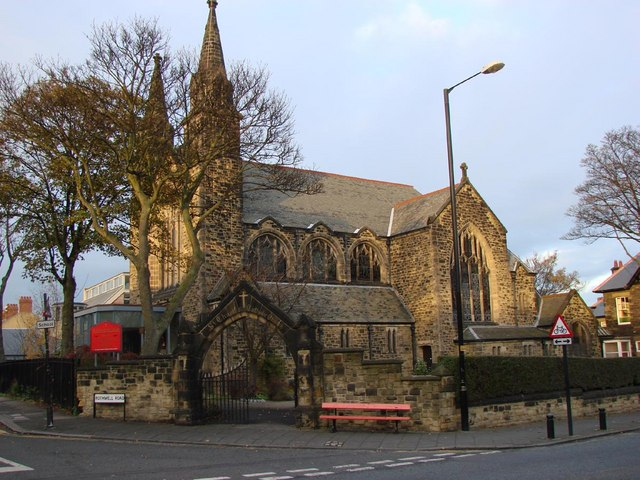
St Charles Borromeo Church, Gosforth

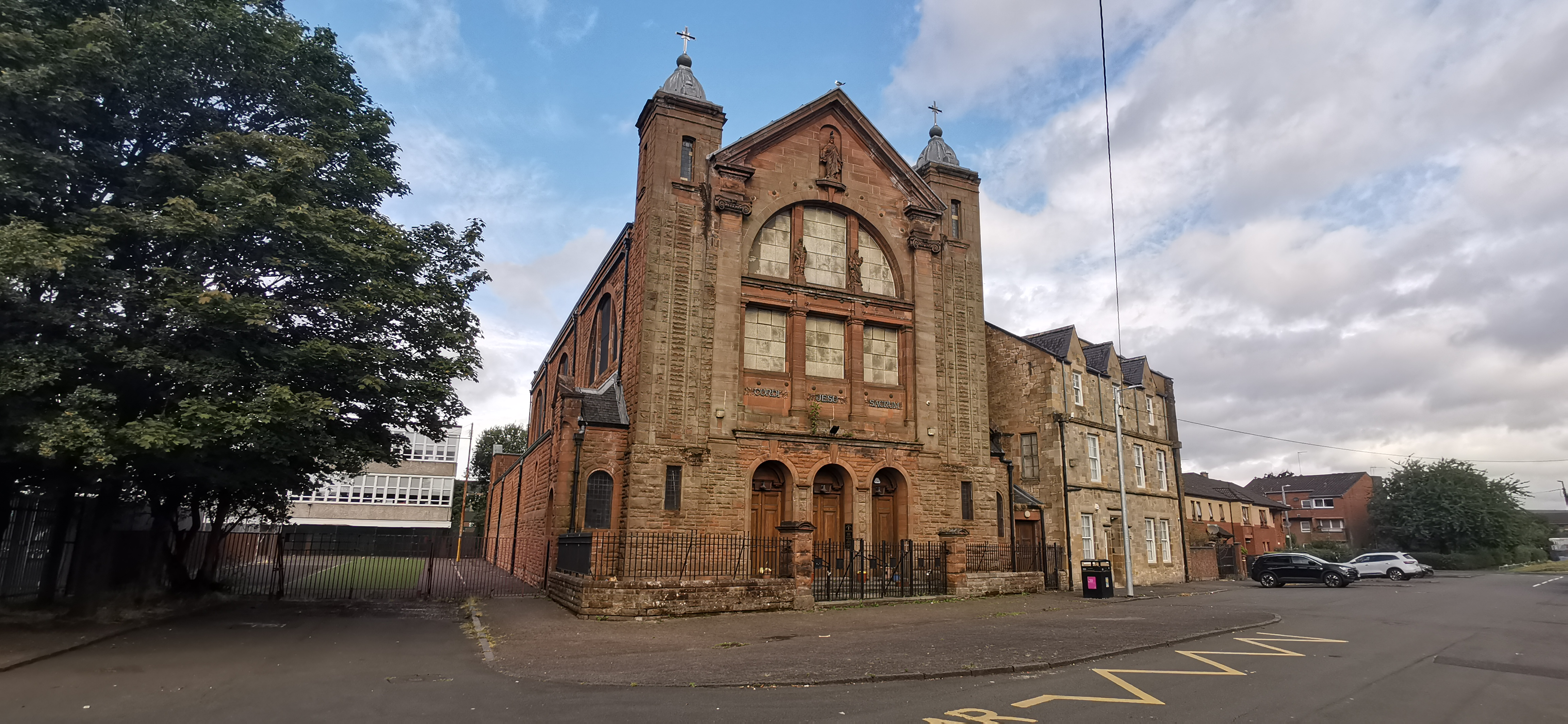
Sacred Heart Church, Glasgow

== Later life ==
The Menart & Jarvie partnership was dissolved some time before 1911. Ménart continued to practise in Glasgow, designing a number of First World War memorials in Belgium, and returned to his native country in 1928 at the age of about 52. He died in Brussels in 1956.

== See also ==
- St Aloysius Church, Glasgow
- Sacred Heart Church, Glasgow
