= Scottish charitable incorporated organisation =

Form of business

A Scottish charitable incorporated organisation (SCIO) is a corporate form of business designed for (and only available to) charitable organisations in Scotland, similar to (but with important differences from) a charitable incorporated organisation in England and Wales.

== Overview ==
CIO status is conferred by the Office of the Scottish Charity Regulator on application by a charity, whether new or existing.

The main benefits of the form are that the charity has legal personality (the ability to enter contracts, sue and be sued, and to hold property in its own name - rather than in the name of its trustees), and its members have limited liability (their liability in the event the charity becomes insolvent is limited or nil).

Gareth G Morgan of Schulich School of Business at York University says:

the development of CIOs has taken a different path with far greater jurisdictional differences than would be needed simply to accommodate the different legal systems... in Scotland the emphasis seems to have been on simplicity and pragmatism, whilst in England and Wales the focus appears to be more on retaining corporate parallels with company law. These differences are particularly evident in the vastly different insolvency regimes, and in the order of magnitude difference in the detail of the secondary legislation.

== History ==
The Scottish regulator began registering SCIOs in April 2011, and a fifth of new Scottish charities registered by December of that year were SCIOs. To spread the workload for the regulator, existing charitable companies and industrial and provident societies were unable to convert to SCIOs until 2012; other forms of charity in Scotland were able to apply from April 2011.
