= Springburn Public Halls =

Municipal building in Springburn, Scotland

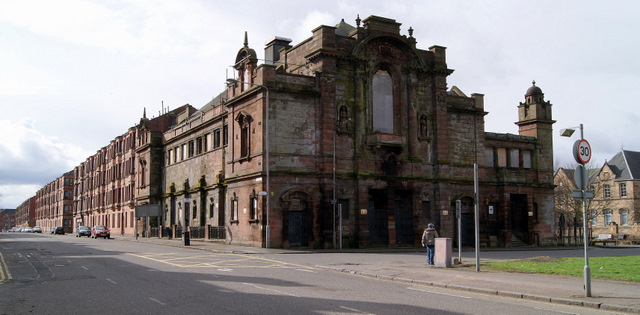
- The building in 2010

- Shown in Glasgow
- 55.8803°N 4.2350°W
- Location: Millarbank Street, Glasgow

History
- Built: 1902

Site notes
- Architect: William B. Whitie
- Architectural style: Italian Renaissance style

Listed Building – Category B
- Official name: 46 Keppochill Road, 1, 11 Millarbank Street Sports Centre, Formerly Springburn Public Halls
- Designated: 16 March 1993
- Reference no.: LB33877

Springburn Public Halls was a public events venue on Millarbank Street in Springburn, part of Glasgow, Scotland. The building, which was derelict for three decades before being demolished in 2012, was a Category B listed building.

== History ==
Following significant population growth in the area, largely associated with the locomotive manufacturing industry, James Reid of Neilson, Reid & Co. decided to donate £12,000 to fund the building of a local events venue for the Springburn area. As part of this arrangement Glasgow Corporation committed to fund the Springburn Winter Gardens. The site that Reid selected, in Millarbank Street, was open ground adjacent to the Cowlairs Somerville Church. The foundation stone for the new building was laid by the Lord Provost of Glasgow, Samuel Chisholm, in 1899. It was designed by William B. Whitie in the Italian Renaissance style, built in red ashlar stone and was officially opened on 16 May 1902.

The design involved a main frontage of five bays facing onto Millarbank Street. The left-hand section of five bays was symmetrical and featured, in the central bay, two doorways with fanlights and keystones on the ground floor, and a tall round headed window, flanked by Corinthian order pilasters supporting a cornice, a frieze and a segmental open pediment, on the first floor. The bays on either side of the central bay contained windows with keystones on the ground floor, and niches with statues of Greek goddesses on the first floor. The outer bays of the left-hand section contained doorways with curved pediments on the ground floor and were blind on the first floor. The right-hand section of two bays contained, on the left, a doorway with a keystone flanked by a pair of windows, and four windows on the first floor, all surmounted by a pyramid-shaped roof. The far right-hand bay contained a three-stage tower, which was blind in all stages and surmounted by a dome. Internally the principal room was the main assembly hall which was 77 feet (23 m) long and 40 feet (12 m) wide. A pipe organ by James Jepson Binns was installed above the stage in 1905.

The building served as an events venue, for activities such as dancing, until it closed in 1960. It was then converted for use as a sports centre until it was shut down, because of dry rot, in 1985. The building was subsequently badly maintained and became dilapidated: it was demolished, because of public safety concerns, in December 2012. The statues, which had been sculpted by James M. Sherriff, were recovered before the demolition and placed in storage. North Glasgow Homes and Chameleon subsequently redeveloped the site for residential use with a new block of 49 flats.

== See also ==
- List of listed buildings in Glasgow/11
