= Western Infirmary =

- NHS Greater Glasgow and Clyde
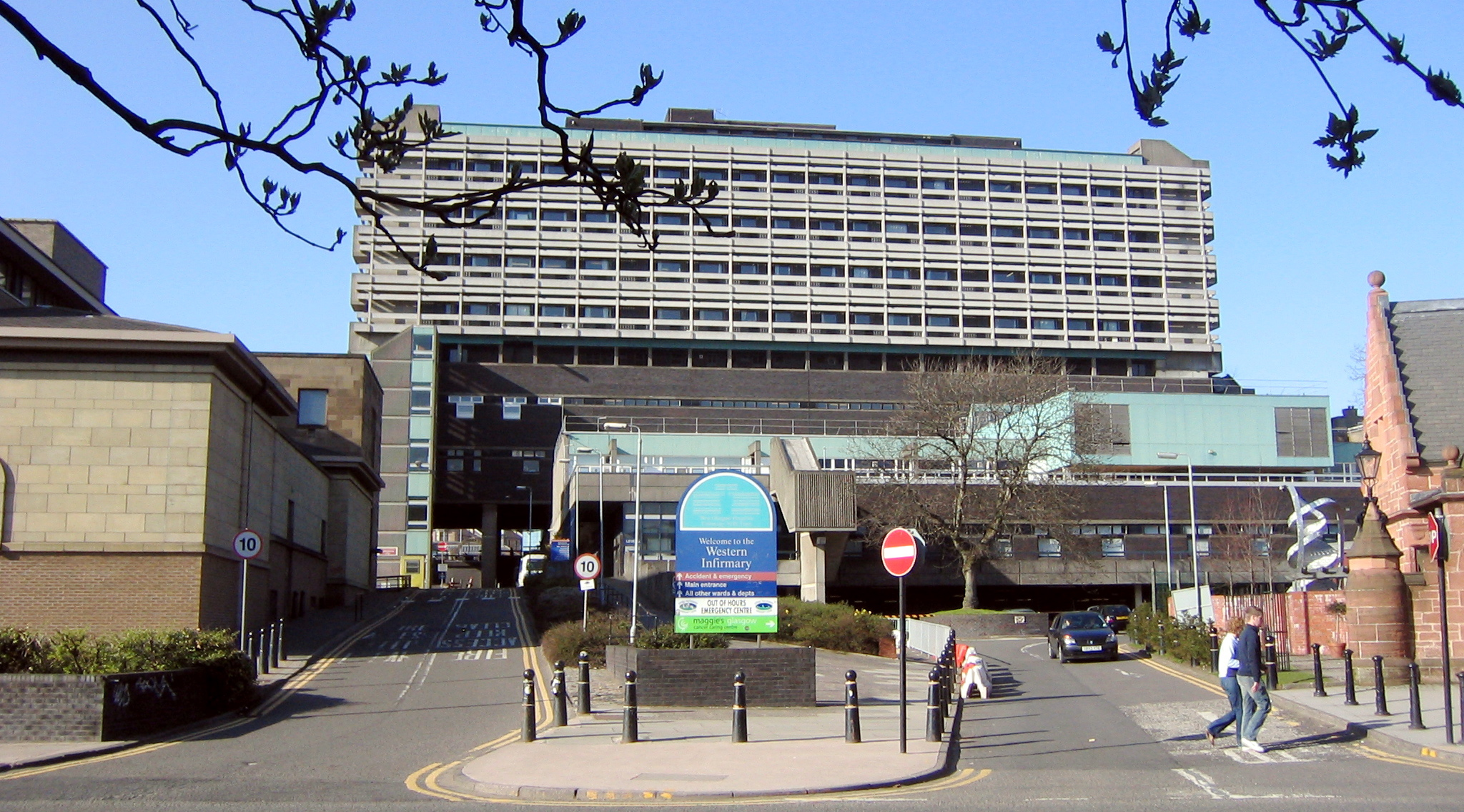
- Western Infirmary

- Shown in Glasgow

Geography
- Location: Dumbarton Road, Glasgow, Scotland
- Coordinates: 55°52′15.56″N 4°17′44.74″W

Organisation
- Care system: NHS Scotland
- Type: Teaching
- Affiliated university: University of Glasgow

Services
- Emergency department: Yes

History
- Founded: 1874
- Closed: 2015

Links
- Lists: Hospitals in Scotland

The Western Infirmary was a teaching hospital situated in Yorkhill in the West End of Glasgow, Scotland, that was managed by NHS Greater Glasgow and Clyde. It was opened in 1874 and closed in 2015.

== History ==
After the University of Glasgow moved from the city centre to the West End in the 1870s, distancing itself from the Royal Infirmary, a new teaching hospital was commissioned for the new university site and opened in 1874. The Western Infirmary opened as a voluntary hospital relying upon donations and bequests from members of the public. By 1890, there had already been 877 operations performed in the hospital.

Although the hospital initially had only 150 beds, by 1911 this had increased to over 600. In 1936, the decision was taken to establish a medical department. In 1930, a radiology department opened and, in 1936, a new ophthalmology department was officially opened, named the Tennent Memorial, with an entrance on Church Street. In 1938, the research capacity increased with the opening of the Gardiner Institute of Medicine. Taking its name from the family that had gifted almost £25,000 towards its foundation the institute worked in conjunction with the University of Glasgow.

In 1948 with the introduction of the National Health Service the Western Infirmary came under the management of the Glasgow Western Hospitals Board of Management.

A£3.5 million two-phase rebuilding programme was authorised by the Glasgow Corporation in June 1962. The 256–bed Phase 1 block was completed in 1974. After the completion of the nearby Gartnavel General Hospital in 1972, Phase 2 was indefinitely postponed in 1975.

In 2002, NHS Greater Glasgow & Clyde announced the results of a three-year consultation, the Greater Glasgow's Acute Services Review, wherein they outlined a £700 million modernisation plan for Glasgow's hospitals. As part of the plan, some services would be transferred to expanded facilities at Gartnavel General Hospital but most of them would be transferred to new facilities at the Queen Elizabeth University Hospital site. By 2010 the Western Infirmary had only 493 inpatient beds.

In autumn 2015, the Western Infirmary closed with the exception of the minor injuries unit. At the end of 2015 the Minor Injuries Unit moved a short distance to the Yorkhill Hospital site and the Western Infirmary closed completely on 6 December 2015.

In accordance with a commitment given by the hospital to the university in 1878 that the site would be offered back to the university if it was no longer required for healthcare, the university exercised its right to acquire the site and plans to redevelop it were approved in February 2017.

== Nursing staff ==
At the time the Western Infirmary was opened individual hospitals conducted their own nurse training programmes. The probationers, as they were known, had to be 21 before they could start their training. The first Matron who trained nurses at the Western was Miss Clyde. She held this position for 22 years. The training included both learning on the ward and classroom teaching by appointed lecturers. Successful completion of the four-year programme and passing the examination led to the award of the Certificate of the Infirmary. A preliminary training school for nurses was established in 1933. In 1960 a course for operating theatre sisters was introduced.

- Helen Gregory Smith RRC was appointed Matron of the Western Infirmary in 1906, a position she held until 1933. She completed her training at the Western in 1899. She was awarded a CBE in 1932 in recognition of her role as president, Scottish Matrons' Association, President, Benevolent Fund for Nurses in Scotland and for services to the nursing profession in Scotland.
- Margaret Mary Craig, LLA, was appointed Matron of the Western in 1933, following the retirement of Smith. Craig trained at the Western and held a Sister Tutor's Certificate of King’s College for Women, London and was an examiner for the General Nursing Council for Scotland. She was also Principal Matron, 3rd Scottish General Hospital Territorial Army Nursing Service.
- Effie Margaret Robertson became Principal Sister Tutor in 1926. She completed her training at the Western in 1921 receiving four medals including the Florence Nightingale medal and the John Morton medal in surgery. She also received a scholarship to study the Sister Tutor's Certificate of King's College for Women, London. It was felt her qualities as a nurse tutor enhanced the reputation of the School of Nursing. Robertson became Matron in 1928. She resigned in 1940 on her engagement to be married.
- Mary Fallow Miller was Matron of the Western Infirmary for 17 years from 1950. She completed her nurse training at the Western in 1931. She completed her midwifery training at the County Maternity Hospital, Bellshill. She worked as a nurse with the UNRRA in Germany from 1945 to 1947 and was matron of Raigmore Hospital, Inverness from 1947 to 1950. She served as a Council member of the Royal College of Nursing.
- Vivienne Humphries SRN, SCM, was appointed matron in 1967. Prior to this she was deputy matron at the Royal Hospital, Wolverhampton. She did not train at the Western having completed her this at Queen Elizabeth Hospital Birmingham, St Mary’s Hospital, Portsmouth and the Royal Hampshire County Hospital, Winchester. She completed the nursing administration course at the King’s Fund Staff College for Matrons.
- Margaret Wallace, ARRC, was assistant matron at the Western from 1923 until her retirement in 1946. She trained at the Western from 1910 to 1914. Wallace was awarded the "Nightingale" medal and £5 prize at the end of her training and also gained the first medical and surgical prizes for the November examinations. Wallace also served in the QAIMNS. She was a member of the Royal College of Nursing.

Around the time of the first World War a number of nurses who had either been trained or worked at the Western Infirmary went on to have distinguished careers including positions of high rank in both medical and military services. This reflected the high quality of nurse training at the Western Infirmary.

- Agnes Carnochan Douglas began her nursing career at the Western Infirmary, Glasgow where she worked with the surgeon Sir William Macewen. He offered her the position of Matron at Erskine Hospital (formerly the Princess Louise Scottish Hospital for Limbless Sailors and Soldiers) when it opened in 1916.
- Dame Katherine Watt, DBE RRC, served as a sister in WW1 and later joined the Ministry of Defence as Chief Nursing Officer.
- Dame Emily Blair, DBE RRC, succeeded her as Matron-in-Chief of the RAF Nursing service and was subsequently Matron-in Chief of the British Red Cross.
- Colonel Helen S Gillespie, MBE, RRC, trained at the Western Infirmary from 1922 to 1926. She joined the Army Nursing Service in 1926 and served in India from 1927. During the Second World War she served in Palestine and held administrative appointments in the Burma and South-East Asia Commands and at the War Office. In 1952 she was appointed Matron-in-Chief and Director of Army Nursing Services of the Queen Alexandra’s Royal Army Nursing Corps.
- Catherine Roy was Matron-in-Chief of Queen Alexandra’s Imperial Military Nursing service.

== Services ==
There was a Maggie's centre at the hospital to help cancer patients, as well as the Glasgow Clinical Research Facility.
