= Royal Hospital for Children, Glasgow =

The Royal Hospital for Children
- NHS Greater Glasgow and Clyde
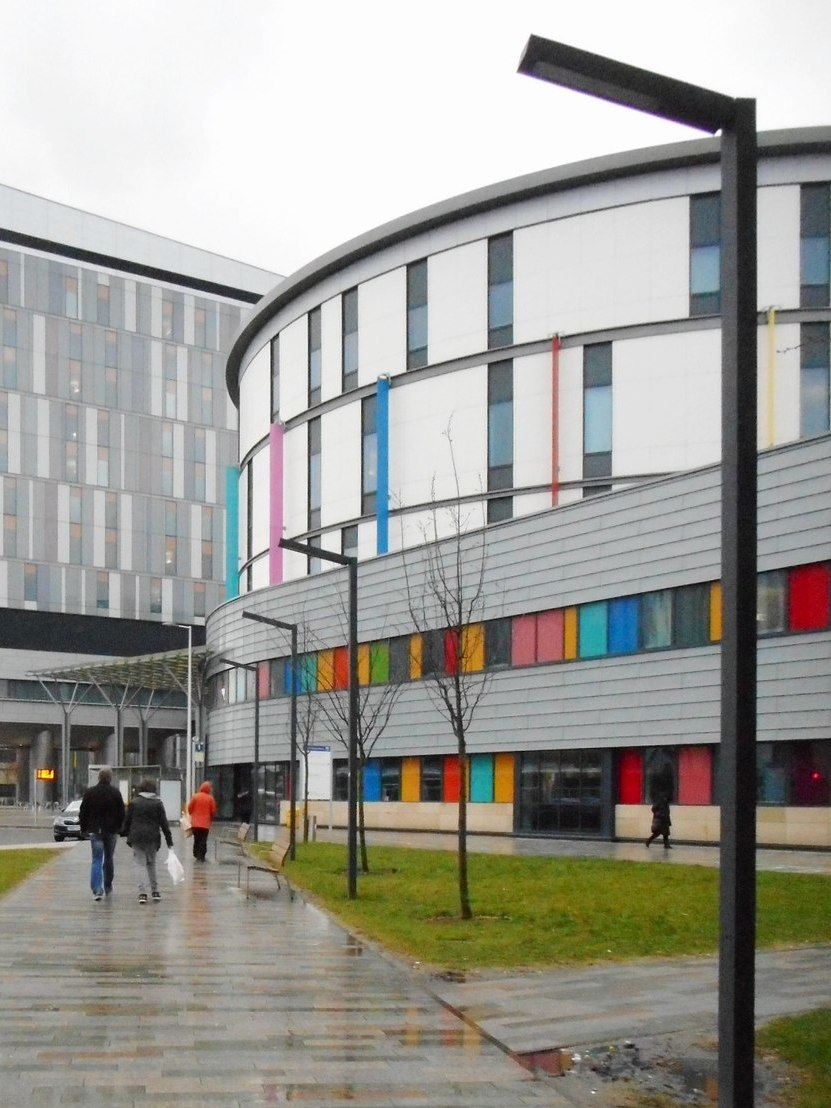
- Royal Hospital for Children,

- Location within Glasgow

Geography
- Location: Govan, Glasgow, Scotland
- Coordinates: 55.862813°N 4.342642°W

Organisation
- Care system: NHS Scotland
- Affiliated university: University of Glasgow, Glasgow Caledonian University, University of the West of Scotland

Services
- Beds: 256

History
- Founded: 2015

Links
- Website: Royal Hospital for Children
- Other links: List of hospitals in Scotland

The Royal Hospital for Children is a 256-bed hospital specialising in paediatric healthcare for children and young people up to the age of 16. The hospital is part of the Queen Elizabeth University Hospital and is built on the site of the former Southern General Hospital, in Govan and opened in June 2015. The hospital replaced the Royal Hospital for Sick Children in Yorkhill. It is managed by NHS Greater Glasgow and Clyde.

== History ==
The Royal Hospital for Children, like the adjacent Queen Elizabeth University Hospital, was designed by Nightingale Associates, with construction carried out by Brookfield Multiplex, who previously built Wembley Stadium. The new hospital was built on the site of the old Southern General Hospital. In January 2010, NHS Greater Glasgow and Clyde closed the Queen Mother's Maternity Hospital at Yorkhill, with maternity services relocating to the Southern General Hospital.

Construction started in early 2011. Originally to be called Royal Hospital for Sick Children, it was named Royal Hospital for Children. It was originally hoped the new hospital would be ready by 2014, but medical services did not start to be transferred until 10 June 2015.

== Design ==
The new children's hospital is a mix of four-bedded and single-bedded accommodation. The design included a part covered roof garden where it was intended that young patients would be able to enjoy a range of activities in the fresh air. In 2016 the roof garden play area was closed amid health and safety concerns.

The hospital has a 47-seat cinema, which was built in partnership with MediCinema costing around £250,000 to install. In addition to the 47 seats the facility serves patients in wheelchairs and beds.

== Services ==
The Royal Hospital for Children, while retaining a somewhat separate identity from the Queen Elizabeth University Hospital, is adjoined and integrated with the adult hospital. With 256 beds and 5 floors, it replaced the Royal Hospital for Sick Children located in Yorkhill, Glasgow.
