= Glasgow Clinical Trials Unit =

Scottish research establishment

The Glasgow Clinical Trials Unit (CTU) is a collaborative research establishment in Glasgow, Scotland. It comprises the Glasgow Clinical Research Facility, the Robertson Centre for Biostatistics and Greater Glasgow and Clyde NHS R&D division.

== History ==
In November 2007 the UKCRN gave the Glasgow Clinical Trials Unit registered Clinical Trials Unit status.
