= Glasgow Clinical Research Facility =

Research institute in Glasgow, Scotland

Coordinates: 55°51′39″N 4°20′24″W

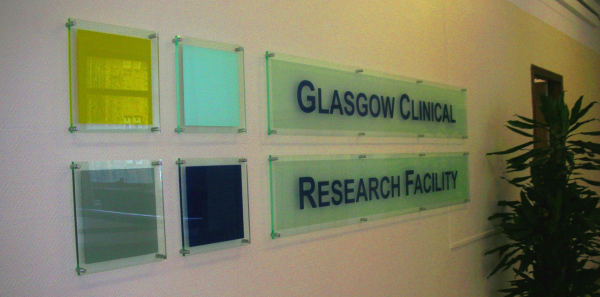
The Glasgow Clinical Research Facility's former site at the Western Infirmary

The Glasgow Clinical Research Facility (Glasgow CRF) is a research centre at the Queen Elizabeth University Hospital in Govan, Glasgow, Scotland.

== History ==
Created on the 1 April 2006 from the NHS Clinical Research Grant Agreement with the CSO. The CRF works closely with its Higher Education partners including the University of Glasgow, University of Strathclyde, University of the West of Scotland and Glasgow Caledonian University.

The Glasgow CRF was initially based in the first floor of the Tennent Building, Western Infirmary, with a satellite site in the Lister Building at Glasgow Royal Infirmary (GRI). It moved premises from the Western Infirmary to the new South Glasgow Hospital (Queen Elizabeth University Hospital) in 2015 where it is situated within the Institute of Neurological Sciences building. The facility at GRI remains.

== Current organisation and services ==
The Glasgow CRF is now part of the greater organisation, the Glasgow Clinical Trials Unit, with their partner the Robertson Centre for Biostatistics. The Glasgow CRF has both nursing and administrative staff, offering research infrastructure support in terms of the provision of trained research staff, dedicated clinical research space and expertise in the conduct of clinical trials. In addition, they have an Education and Training Officer and offer a range of educational opportunities including a one-day Good Clinical Practice (GCP) workshop which they run monthly. In conjunction with their partners at the Robertson Centre for Biostatistics they are also able to offer help with protocol design and statistical and data management support.

They also have a Scientific Steering Group whose remit is to direct and monitor the operations of the Facility. This group has representation from the NHS, their partner academic institutions and senior clinical researchers.
