= Stobhill Hospital =

- NHS Greater Glasgow and Clyde
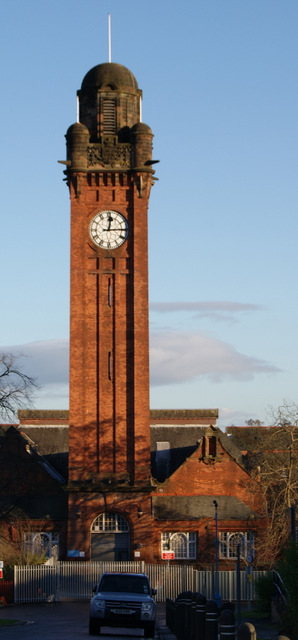
- Stobhill Hospital's Clock tower

- Location within Glasgow

Geography
- Location: Balornock Road, Glasgow, Scotland
- Coordinates: 55.8939°N 4.2225°W

Organisation
- Care system: NHS Scotland
- Type: Teaching; Ambulatory care Mental health
- Affiliated university: University of Glasgow

Services
- Emergency department: In-hours (09:00–21:00) Minor injuries unit
- Beds: 389 (60 short-stay surgical and rehabilitation, 329 mental health)

History
- Founded: 15 September 1904

Links
- Website: New Stobhill Hospital
- Lists: Hospitals in Scotland

Stobhill Hospital is located in Springburn in the north of Glasgow, Scotland. It serves the population of North Glasgow and part of East Dunbartonshire. It is managed by NHS Greater Glasgow and Clyde.

== History ==
=== Early history ===
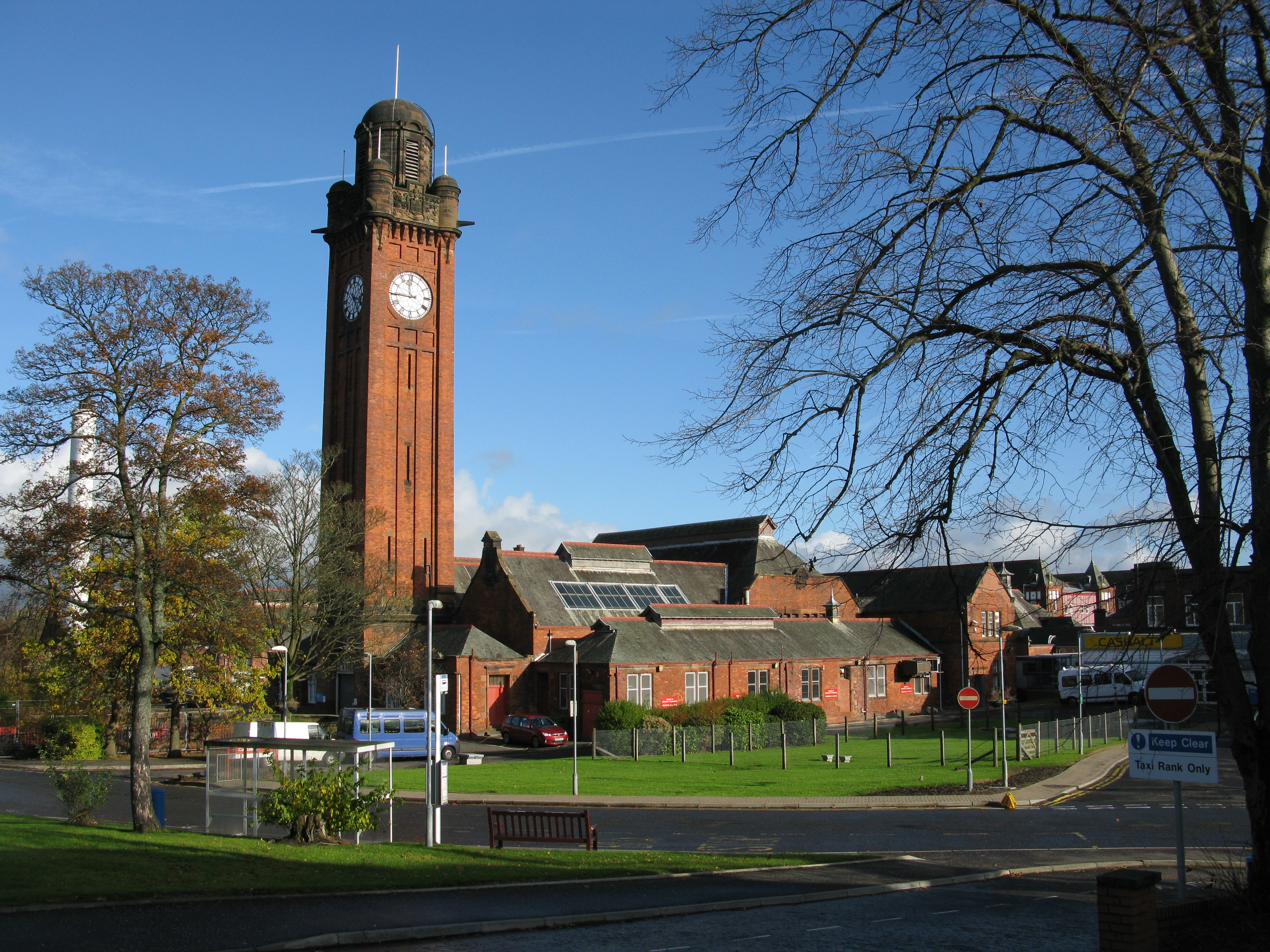
Stobhill Hospital, designed by Thomson & Sandilands, opened in September 1904

Stobhill was originally a Poor Law hospital, commissioned by the Glasgow Parish Council. The design competition, which was judged by John James Burnet, was won by Glasgow architects, Thomson & Sandilands. The foundation stone was laid in September 1901 by Lord Balfour of Burleigh, the then Secretary of State for Scotland, and Stobhill Hospital was formally opened on 15 September 1904, the same day as the Western District Hospital at Oakbank in Maryhill and the Eastern District Hospital at Duke Street. The original buildings are now graded as category B listed buildings.

It was built with 1,867 beds organised in eighteen two-storey red brick Nightingale ward blocks on a sprawling, 47-acre (19-hectare) campus on the edge of Springburn Park. The Hamiltonhill Branch of the Lanarkshire and Dumbartonshire Railway, which ran past the northern boundary of the hospital grounds, facilitated the transport of coal and supplies to the hospital. The cost of the building was £250,000. It featured a large clocktower at the centre of the site, which has become a dominant landmark in the north of the city. The motto of the new hospital was Health is Wealth.

During the First World War, the building was requisitioned by the War Office to create the 3rd and 4th Scottish General Hospitals, facilities for the Royal Army Medical Corps to treat military casualties. Wounded servicemen arrived by specially converted hospital trains that terminated at a temporary railway platform built within the hospital grounds. A staff of 240 Territorial Force nurses as well as volunteers from the St. Andrew's Ambulance Association cared for over 1,000 patients at a time, suffering from battlefield wounds to venereal disease, until the return of the hospital to civilian use in early 1920.

In 1928 a new radiology department was opened and Stobhill became a general hospital in 1929. In 1930 Stobhill came under the control of the Glasgow Corporation and changed from being a Poor Law Hospital to become a Municipal Hospital due to the Local Government (Scotland) Act 1929. In 1931 a new maternity unit opened. In 1935, on the death of Sir Hugh Reid of the North British Locomotive Company in Springburn, he bequeathed the family's mansion at Balgrayhill, Belmont House, to the hospital in memory of his wife, and it was converted to become the Marion Reid Home for the care of babies and very young children in 1936. Stobhill became a teaching hospital in 1937 with the arrival of Noah Morris, Professor of Materia Medica at the University of Glasgow Medical School.

=== National Health Service ===
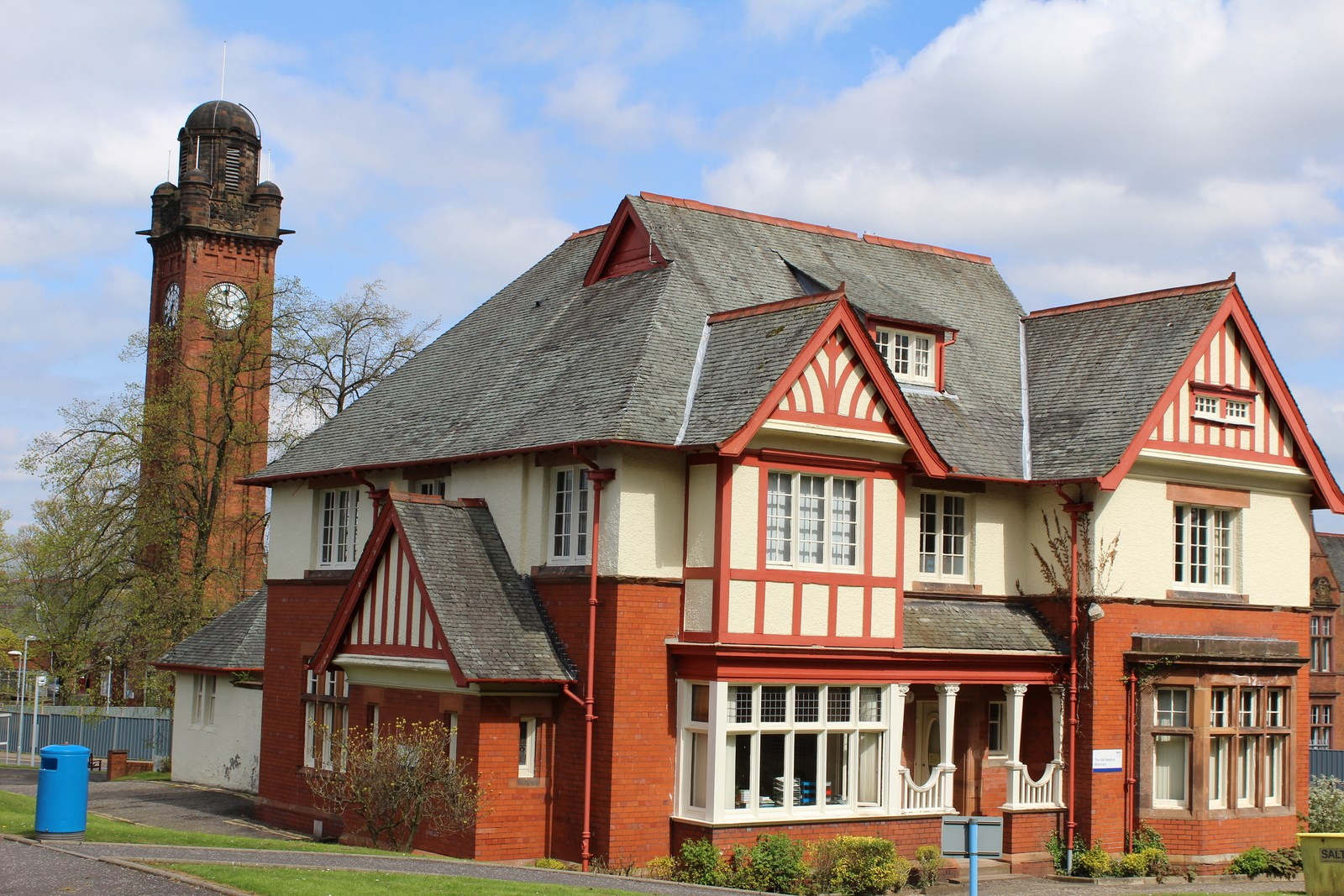
The Old Medical Refectory at Stobhill was built in the Modern Style and is one of the remaining original listed buildings at the hospital.

In 1948 it was transferred to the National Health Service, under the Board of Management for Glasgow Northern Hospitals, and designated one of the five major central hospitals of the new Western Regional Hospital Board. Extensions followed, including a geriatric unit, which opened in 1953, the first hospital in Scotland to be fitted with a piped oxygen system in 1957, a pharmacy in 1961, a premature baby ward in 1962, the Edward Unit for Mothers and Babies in 1963, a staff library in 1964, the Clinical Teaching Centre and the Group Training School in 1967 and a modern Pathology Department in 1968. A new operating theatre and postgraduate medical teaching complex opened in 1970.

With the reorganisation of the National Health Service in 1974, Stobhill became the responsibility of the Northern District of the Greater Glasgow Health Board. A 52-bed Marie Curie Cancer Care hospice was opened adjacent to the hospital in 1976. On 14 January 1979, Stobhill Hospital was the birthplace of Alastair MacDonald, the world's second in vitro fertilisation (IVF) baby and the first IVF-conceived boy. The birth was a landmark moment for the hospital and medical science, as it proved that the success of the world's first IVF baby was a repeatable medical reality rather than an isolated phenomenon. The maternity unit was closed in 1992, leaving Stobhill as a general and geriatric medicine hospital.

=== Redevelopment ===
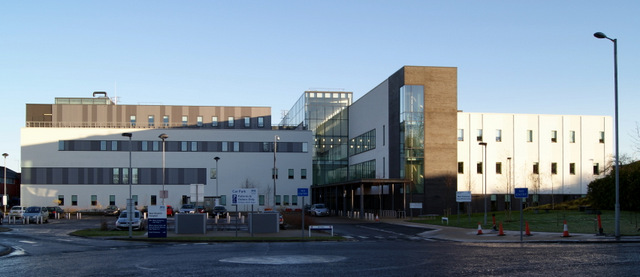
The New Stobhill Hospital, designed by Reiach and Hall, opened in June 2009

The Greater Glasgow's Acute Services Review, published by NHS Greater Glasgow in 2002, recommended replacing the existing Stobhill Hospital building and its 440-bed general medical and surgical inpatient facilities with an outpatient Ambulatory Care and Diagnostic Hospital. Controversy over this decision resulted in Jean Turner's election as an independent Member of the Scottish Parliament for Strathkelvin and Bearsden over this single issue in 2003.

Despite this, a new hospital, the first Ambulatory Care hospital in Scotland, specialising in areas such as day surgery, was procured under a Private Finance Initiative contract in November 2006. The new hospital building, which was designed by Reiach and Hall and built by Balfour Beatty at a cost of £100 million, opened in June 2009. The new hospital building was voted the world's best hospital of its size in the 2010 Design and Health International Academy Awards in addition to being recognised by the Royal Institute of British Architects and Glasgow Institute of Architects. The design of the hospital was also praised in the Architects' Journal. A 60-bed ward block was added by the same architects in 2011, comprising 12 overnight beds to extend the use of the existing day surgery to include more complex operations and an evening theatre list, and two 24-bed rehabilitation wards. Half of the beds are provided in single rooms and half in multi-bed wards to enable a choice of accommodation for the expected age and condition of patients.

This reorganisation resulted in the nearest Accident and Emergency and general inpatient facilities being relocated to the Glasgow Royal Infirmary in the city centre, as inpatient and A&E services were eventually phased out by the end of 2011, though a Minor injuries unit has been retained.

In October 2018, the Sunday Post and local MP Paul Sweeney exposed a major scrap metal theft at disused buildings in the grounds of the hospital, later securing the commitment of NHS Greater Glasgow and Clyde to restore and illuminate the clock tower at the site.

== Services ==
=== Ambulatory care facilities ===
The New Stobhill Hospital provides general outpatient treatment and diagnostic services such as: physiotherapy, podiatry, occupational therapy, drug rehabilitation, dietetics, dermatology, speech and language therapy, renal dialysis, heart and lung investigations, cardiac rehabilitation, elderly day care, diabetic care, dentistry, a chronic pain service, x-rays, CT scans, MRI scans, nuclear medicine, ophthalmology, orthotics, audiology, endoscopy, colposcopy and haematology.

A 2011 extension to the New Stobhill Hospital has 60 inpatient beds in three wards:

- Ward A, a 12-bed unit for elective surgery recovery, which enables clinicians to extend the range of outpatient day surgical procedures offered within the new hospital
- Ward B, a 24-bed general rehabilitation unit
- Ward C, a 24-bed stroke rehabilitation unit

There is also an in-hours Minor injuries unit (09.00-21.00) and out-of-hours GP service.

=== Mental health facilities ===
- MacKinnon House is a purpose built adult inpatient mental health unit, opened at Stobhill Hospital in April 2000 following the closure of Woodilee Hospital. The unit comprises three twenty-bedded adult acute admission wards (Broadford, Armadale and Struan Wards) and a 12-bed Intensive Psychiatric Care Unit (Portree Ward) and an ECT suite. In addition to general adult acute admissions, Broadford Ward provides inpatient ESTEEM services (treatment for first-episode psychosis), whilst four beds at Armadale Ward are reserved for adult eating disorder admissions.
- Eriskay House, a 15-bed inpatient ward opened in October 2004 as an addition to the MacKinnon House adult inpatient mental health unit. This purpose-built ward, which replaces inpatient services at the former Parkhead Hospital and Ruchill Hospital, providing services for patients with alcohol and substance use issues.
- Rowanbank Clinic, opened in July 2007, is a 74-bed mental health secure care centre. This facility provides Forensic psychiatry services for people with acute mental health problems who may pose a risk to others or have the potential to commit a criminal offence due to their mental illness.
- Skye House, opened in February 2009, replaced an interim facility for young people at Gartnavel Royal Hospital. Housing 24 beds, the purpose-built unit has separate residential, educational and therapeutic facilities and has been designed to meet the needs of young people who need inpatient mental health care.
- Jura, Ailsa and Isla Wards, opened in March 2015 and provide assessment and treatment for older men and women. Isla ward has 24 beds and provides care for older adults with a mental illness, Jura ward has 20 beds and provides care for people with dementia. Ailsa ward is a 20-bed rehabilitation unit that replaced the Orchards on the old Ruchill Hospital site.
- Nairn and Munro Wards, were refurbished in 2017 to provide two 20-bed mixed-sex acute mental health admission wards, replacing facilities at the former Parkhead Hospital.
- Elgin and Appin Wards, opened in September 2020 on the site of two original nightingale wards following a £10.7M development and have space for up to 40 inpatients. Elgin is dedicated to adult acute mental health inpatient care while Appin focuses on older adults with functional mental health issues.

=== Marie Curie Hospice ===
Marie Curie Cancer Care has a hospice at Stobhill. The charity built a new hospice which was opened in January 2010. The 30-room hospice replaces the charity's old building in nearby Belmont Road which cared for more than 1,200 patients and their families each year.

== In popular culture ==
- Richard Wilson, OBE worked as a lab technician at the hospital for several years before becoming an actor.
- Harold Bride, wireless officer on the ocean liner RMS Titanic during her ill-fated maiden voyage died at the hospital in 1956.
- Alasdair Gray's 1981 novel Lanark features a complex, rambling building called The Institute which the author states was physically inspired by Stobhill and BBC Television Centre in London.
- According to his autobiography American On Purpose, Scottish-American TV personality Craig Ferguson was born at the hospital at 6:10 a.m., 17 May 1962.
- Bert Jansch, founder member of The Pentangle was born at Stobhill hospital.
- The 1994–1996 BBC TV drama series Cardiac Arrest was filmed on location at Stobhill Hospital's disused maternity unit.
