= Victoria Bruce =

Victoria Bruce may refer to:

- Vicki Bruce (born 1953), English psychologist
- Vicky Bruce (born 1994), American soccer player
- Victoria Alexandrina Katherine Bruce (1898–1951), British prison governor
