= Parkhead Hospital =

- NHS Greater Glasgow and Clyde
- Shown in Glasgow

Geography
- Location: Salamanca Street, Glasgow, Scotland
- Coordinates: 55.8527°N 4.1957°W

Organisation
- Care system: NHS Scotland
- Type: Mental health

Services
- Emergency department: No

History
- Founded: 1989
- Closed: 2018

Links
- Lists: Hospitals in Scotland

Parkhead Hospital was a mental health facility on Salamanca Street in Parkhead, Glasgow, Scotland. It was managed by NHS Greater Glasgow and Clyde.

== History ==
The facility, which was commissioned to replace the mental health functions of the Duke Street Hospital as well as the Gartloch Hospital, was opened by the Princess of Wales in April 1989, on some of the land previously occupied by the William Beardmore and Company steelworks (Parkhead Forge), the majority of which became the Forge Shopping Centre located a short distance to the west. Deficiencies in the structure of the hospital were identified at an early stage; these included a lack of privacy in the bedrooms with each area divided by paper curtains.

After services transferred to Stobhill Hospital, Parkhead Hospital closed in February 2018. In October 2019 it was announced that BAM Construction would build a new health hub on the site; the facility would bring together a number of disparately-located community health services.
