= Susan Newell =

Last woman to be hanged as punishment in Scotland

Susan Newell (1893 – 10 October 1923) was the last woman to be hanged as capital punishment in Scotland. She was arrested after the discovery of the body of a 13-year-old newspaper boy, John Johnston. Although there were no witness accounts of him being killed, circumstantial evidence was presented at her trial. She was found guilty of his murder, a plea of insanity was rejected, and she was sentenced to death.

== Background ==
Susan McAllister or Newell was born in Oban from a poor background. She married and had a daughter, Janet McLeod, but was widowed when her husband was killed in World War I. By 1923 she had remarried, to John Newell, an ex-serviceman, now working as a Glasgow subway worker. The three lived in a rented room in Newlands Street, Coatbridge.

John Johnston had left his house on the afternoon of 20 June and had not returned. Another boy had met him at 6PM and given him nine papers to sell. The following day Newell and her daughter set off on foot with an unwieldy bundle carried on a Go-Cart. While walking out of Coatbridge on the Glasgow Road, a truck driver offered them a lift. He took them as far as the east end of Glasgow and dropped them off on Duke Street. Locals were suspicious of Newell and the police were called. Newell was followed as she went into a back court and emerged without the bundle. She was apprehended and the boy's body was discovered. On 22 June a post-mortem examination was carried out at Glasgow Central Police Mortuary. Johnston died by strangulation. On the same day John Newell presented himself to a police station in Haddington. The truck driver came forward as a witness. On 26 June Newell and her husband appeared at Airdrie Sheriff Court where they were both accused of murder; they made no plea and were returned to prison.

== Trial ==
On 8 September 1923 Newell and her husband appeared at the Glasgow Sheriff Court and both pled not guilty, while he also lodged a special defence of alibi.

Newell and her husband were both put on trial and the case was heard by Lord Alness at the High Court in Glasgow and the case began on 18 September. There were 70 witnesses cited and 40 gave evidence on the first day of the trial. Her daughter Janet testified against her, describing how the body of the paperboy had been wheeled through the streets on a pram.

John Newell could prove he was at his brother's funeral at the time of the murder. On the second day of the trial, the charge against her husband was withdrawn. Although it had been expected to last several days, the trial concluded on the afternoon of the second day. Her defence put forward a plea of insanity but this was rejected. The jury returned after 35 minutes and delivered a majority verdict, with one juror against. However, the foreman indicated that the jury were unanimous in strongly recommending mercy. She was sentenced to death and the date of execution set for 10 October.

== Petition ==
A petition was put forth to the Secretary of State for Scotland pleading that the sentence be reduced to penal servitude because of her gender and the fact that she was destitute, and husband had abandoned her and was left homeless and penniless. The Secretary, Viscount Novar, rejected that and stated that he would not interfere with the law.

== Execution ==
Newell was executed on 10 October 1923 at Duke Street Prison, Glasgow. There had not been an execution of a woman in Glasgow in the seventy years preceding this. Newell was the last woman in Scotland to be executed.
