= Queen Elizabeth University Hospital =

- NHS Greater Glasgow and Clyde
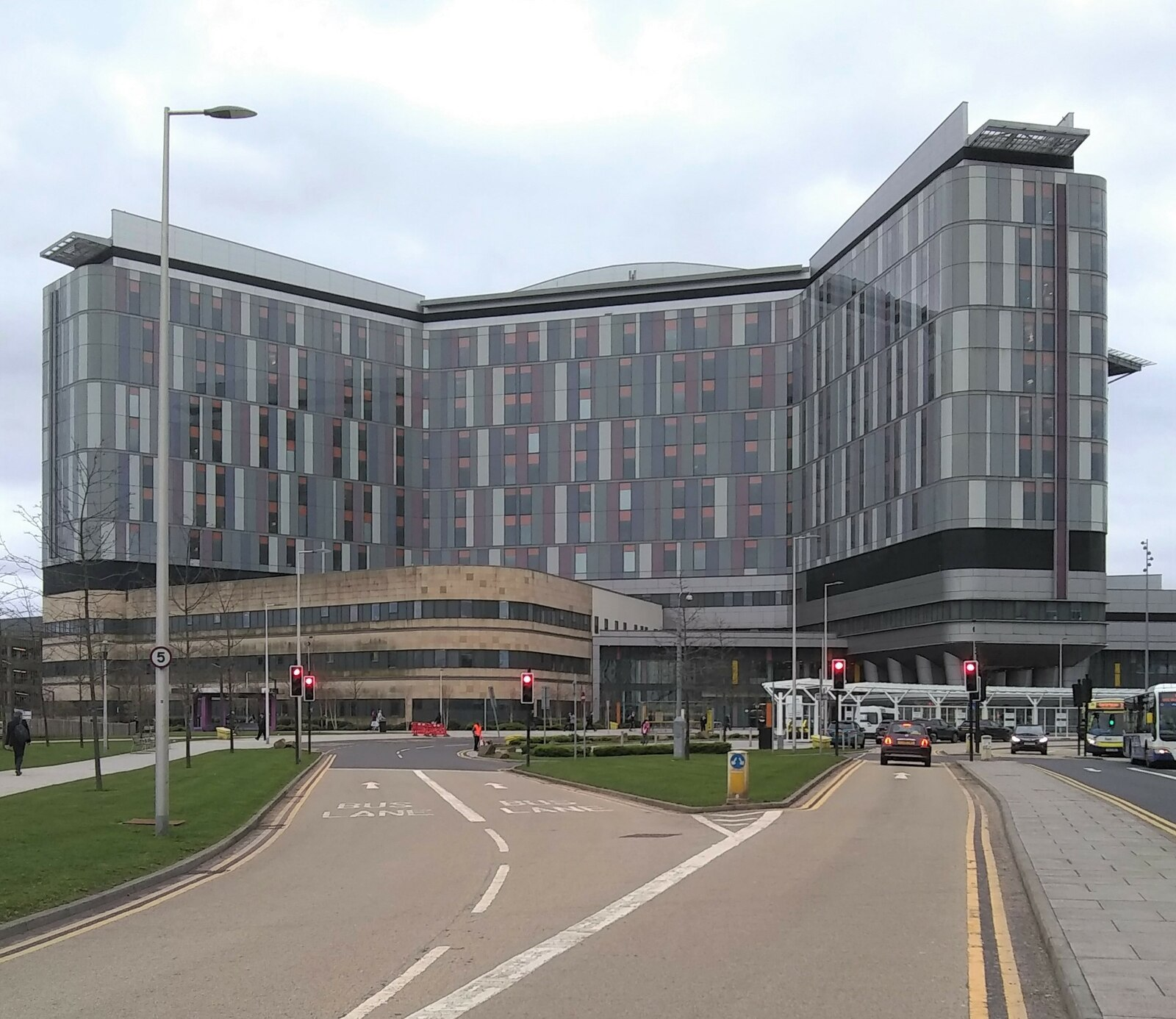
- The QEUH building as viewed in March 2021

- Location within Glasgow

Geography
- Location: 1345 Govan Road, Govan, Glasgow, Scotland
- Coordinates: 55°51′44″N 04°20′28″W

Organisation
- Care system: NHS Scotland
- Type: Teaching
- Affiliated university: University of Glasgow; Glasgow Caledonian University; University of the West of Scotland

Services
- Emergency department: Yes (and Major Trauma)
- Beds: 1,677; 256 Children
- Speciality: General

History
- Founded: April 2015

Links
- Website: Queen Elizabeth University Hospital

The Queen Elizabeth University Hospital (QEUH) is a 1,677-bed acute hospital in the Govan area of Glasgow, Scotland. It is built on the site of the former Southern General Hospital and was opened in April 2015. It comprises a 1,109-bed adult hospital, a 256-bed children's hospital and two major emergency departments; one for adults and one for children. There is also an Immediate Assessment Unit for local general practitioners and out-of-hours services, to send patients directly, without having to be processed through the Emergency Department. The retained buildings from the former Southern General Hospital include the Maternity Unit, the Institute of Neurological Sciences, the Langlands Unit for medicine of the elderly and the laboratory.

Hospital Boulevard leads to Arrival Square, with the main entrances to both hospitals, bus stances, taxis, and a pick up / drop off lane for cars.

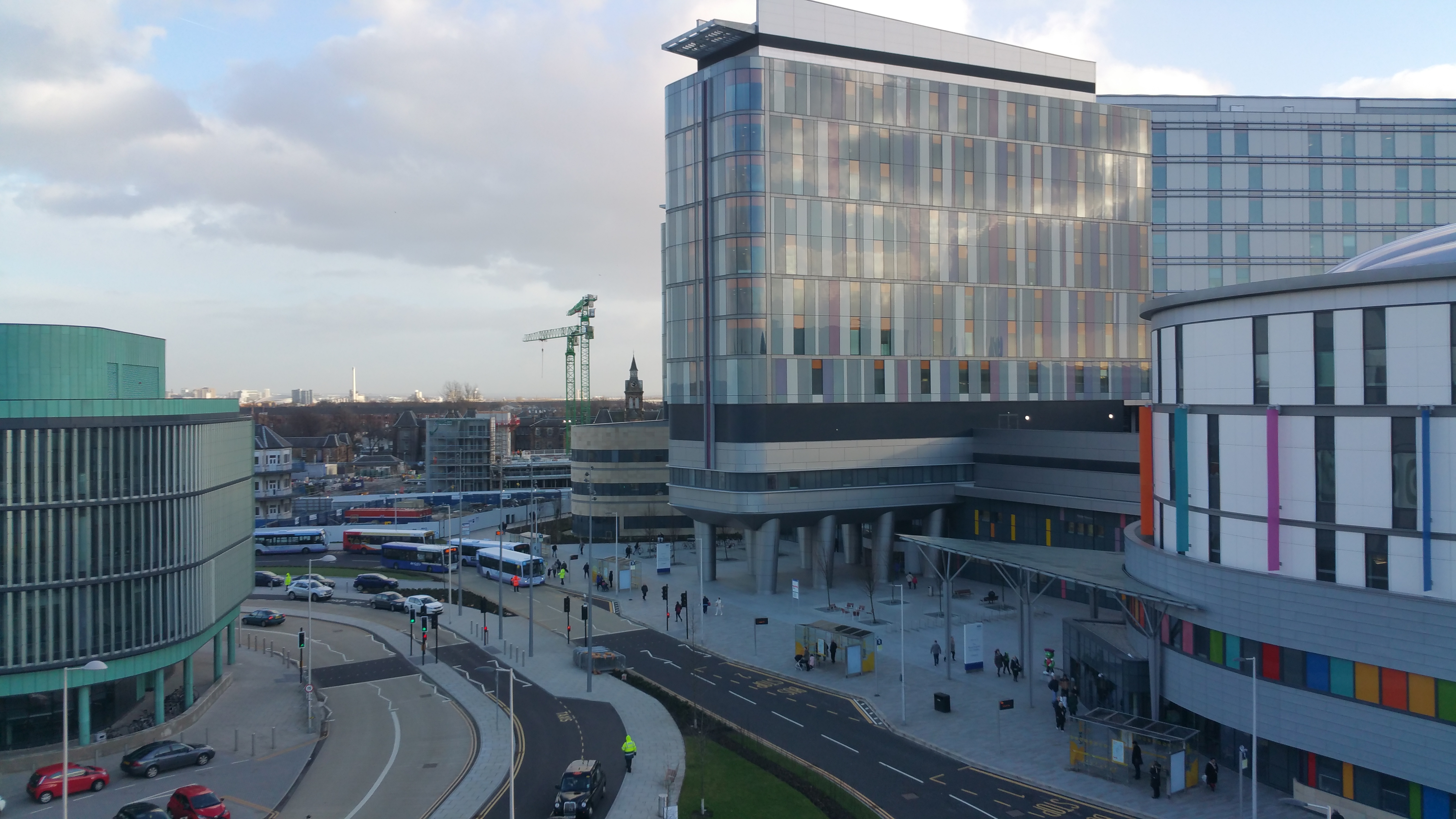
Arrival Square in 2016, QEUH with Royal Hospital for Children to its right. A canopy has since been added around the QEUH support columns, obscuring but sheltering its main entrance.

While some parts of the Queen Elizabeth University Hospital have their own distinct identity and dedicated specialist staff, such as the Royal Hospital for Children, each is completely integrated with linkages for patient transfer, diagnostic services, emergency care and even a rapid access lift from the emergency helicopter pad on the roof of the adult hospital. For example, the new children's hospital is not only linked to the adult hospital but also both the adult and children's hospitals are linked to the redeveloped maternity building and to the Neurosciences Institute.

The hospital hosts services relocated from the Western Infirmary, the Victoria Infirmary including the Mansion House facility, some services from the Royal Infirmary and a range of inpatient services from Gartnavel General Hospital. In addition, the Royal Hospital for Sick Children, previously based at Yorkhill, was moved to a new building adjoining the adult hospital and renamed the "Royal Hospital for Children".

The whole facility is operated by NHS Greater Glasgow and Clyde, and is one of the largest acute hospital campuses in Europe.

== History ==
In 2008 NHS Greater Glasgow and Clyde submitted a business case to the Scottish Government for a new acute hospital to replace facilities at the Western Infirmary and Victoria Infirmary, and to relocate the Royal Hospital for Sick Children, Glasgow, to a new building adjoining the new adult hospital. Designs were unveiled for the hospital campus in November 2009, with public funding being approved. The adult hospital, children's hospital and laboratory buildings were designed by Nightingale Associates, with construction carried out by Multiplex, who previously built Wembley Stadium.

At the time of construction the hospital was Scotland's largest ever publicly funded NHS construction project, costing £842 million to build. it was built on and around site of the old Southern General Hospital, with construction starting in early 2011. Originally to be called South Glasgow University Hospital, it was granted the right to use the name "Queen Elizabeth University Hospital" by Queen Elizabeth II. It was hoped the new hospital would be ready by 2014, but medical services did not start to be transferred from other hospitals until April 2015 and was fully operational by summer 2016.

A physical above ground link for patients and staff from the main building into the Maternity and Neurosciences Institute buildings was constructed, allowing most of the campus to be traversed without going outside. The main hospital facilities are also linked to the laboratory buildings via a tunnel and pneumatic tube system.

The retained buildings from the former hospital, notably the Institute of Neurological Sciences, also started to receive external and internal refurbishment, with a cosmetic panel cladding being applied to the outside of the building in order to bring its appearance in-line with the new hospital buildings at a cost of circa £40 million.

When the hospital opened its doors, locals nicknamed it the "Death Star" due to its star-shaped design, large size and the landing pad for aircraft on the roof.

In February 2020 NHS Greater Glasgow and Clyde started legal proceedings against Multiplex, Capita Property & Infrastructure, and Currie & Brown for an estimated £73 million in losses and damages relating to technical issues at the Queen Elizabeth University Hospital and the Royal Hospital for Children.

=== Infections scandal ===
Between 2017 and 2021, at least 84 child patients at the hospital were infected with rare bacteria while undergoing treatment, linked to contamination of the hospital's water supply by pigeon droppings. The deaths of four patients, including two 10-year-old children and one 73-year-old-woman, were linked to issues with the water system. In 2019, the Scottish Hospitals Inquiry was established to examine issues related to the construction and design of the hospital. In November 2023, NHS Greater Glasgow and Clyde was named as a suspect in a corporate homicide investigation relating to the deaths.

NHS Greater Glasgow and Clyde consistently denied any issues with the hospital's water system until January 2026, when it admitted in its closing statements to the inquiry that "on the balance of probabilities, there is a causal connection between some infections suffered by patients and the hospital environment, in particular the water system." NHS Greater Glasgow and Clyde also claimed that there had been pressure to deliver the project on-time and on-budget, and that the building opened too early and before it was ready.

The families of those who had died issued a statement through their solicitors, accusing NHS Greater Glasgow and Clyde of "deceit and conniving cowardice", and of smearing, demeaning, and misleading them in the course of the inquiry. Scottish Labour leader Anas Sarwar demanded the release of all documentation held by the Scottish Government relating to ministerial conduct during the scandal. When questioned in the Scottish Parliament, First Minister John Swinney denied that there had been any political pressure to open the hospital before it was ready. Former First Minister Nicola Sturgeon - who had been health minister at the time the hospital was ordered and First Minister at the time it opened - also issued a statement saying, "Any suggestion that I applied pressure for the hospital to open before it was ready or that I had any knowledge of safety concerns at that time are completely untrue." NHS Greater Glasgow and Clyde later clarified that the pressure to open the hospital on-time and on-budget came from within the Health Board and not from Government Ministers, as had been alleged by opposition MSPs.

== Services ==
The atrium in the adult hospital building contains support and information services, retail outlets, lifts, and escalator to the first floor Restaurant & Cafe

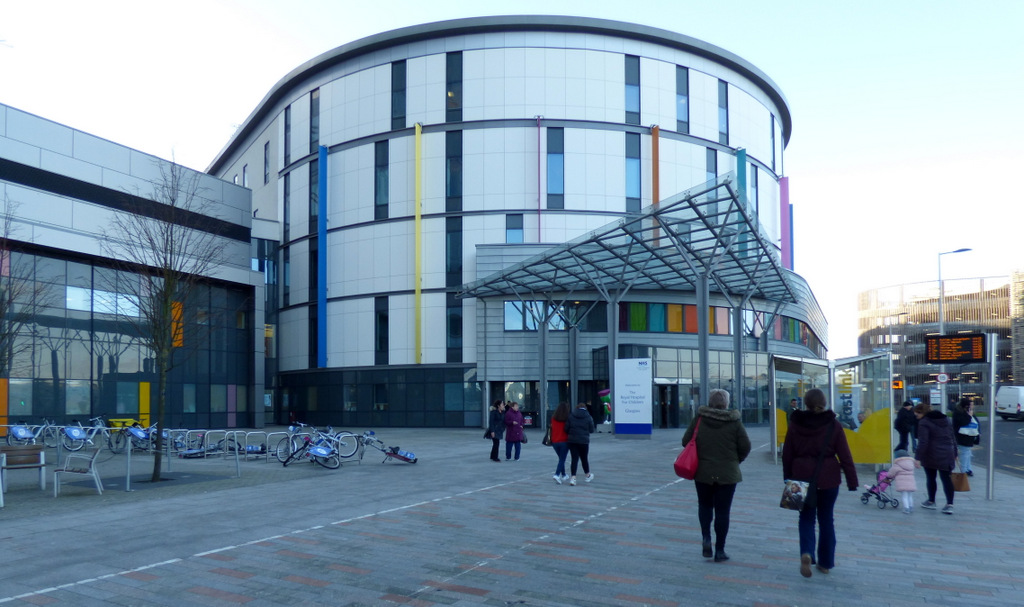
The Royal Hospital for Children building entrance is a short distance to the right of the main adult hospital entrance, at Arrival Square

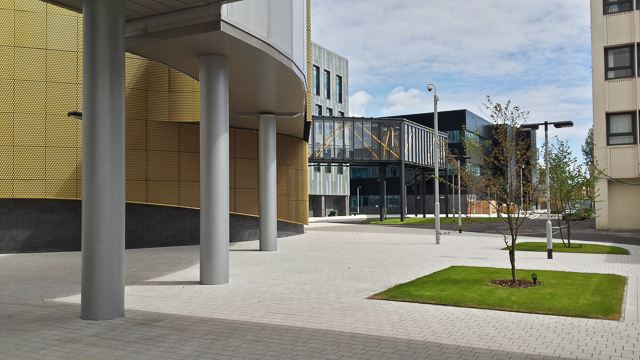
Southern exterior of the University of Glasgow Teaching and Learning Centre at the hospital

=== Adults' hospital ===
The adult hospital, which is 60 metres (197 ft) in height, 14 storeys with four "wings", features 1,109 patient rooms. Rooms within general wards have an external window view. Each room is equipped with private shower and toilet facilities in addition to entertainment such as television and radio. The first floor houses a 500-seat hot food restaurant and a separate cafe. The atrium features shops and banking machines and a lift system that automatically guides users to the lift that will take them to their destination most efficiently. In addition to a canteen and coffee shop, the atrium in the adult hospital building also contains retail outlets including include: Marks & Spencer; WHSmith; Camden Food co; and The Soup & Juice Co. It is estimated that the hospital serves 41% of Scotland's population.

=== Children's hospital ===
The Royal Hospital for Children, while retaining a somewhat separate identity, is adjoined and integrated with the adult hospital. With 256 beds and five floors, it replaced the Royal Hospital for Sick Children located in the Yorkhill area of Glasgow.

=== Maternity Unit ===
The maternity unit, which was built in 1970 and has been retained from the Southern General Hospital, is situated directly across from the children's hospital facilities.

=== Institute of Neurological Sciences ===
The Institute of Neurological Sciences (INS), which was built in 1972 and has been retained from the Southern General Hospital, provides Neurosurgical, Neurological, Clinical Neurophysiology, Neuroradiological, Neuropathology and Oral and Maxillofacial Surgery facilities for the West of Scotland. The department has two buildings, connected by a two storey link bridge. Firstly the larger INS building, which contains critical care, 6 operating theatres, diagnostic imaging services and 4 inpatient wards, as well as the Clinical Research Facility (CRF). The second building is the Neurology Block, which contains an outpatient department, Clinical Neurophysiology, two inpatient wards and the West of Scotland Maxillofacial Prosthetics service. The Physically Disabled Rehabilitation Unit (PDRU) is connected to the Neurology Block and provides specialist Neurorehabilitation services to NHSGGC patients. Attached to the INS surgical building is The Queen Elizabeth National Spinal Unit for Scotland which provides a spinal injuries service to the whole of Scotland. This unit contains two wards and an outpatient/rehabilitation facility. Approximately 60% of the INS services' workload is emergency care.

=== Langlands Building ===
The medicine for the elderly unit, which was built in 2001 and has been retained from the Southern General Hospital, is housed in the Langlands Building at the southern end of the hospital campus and is linked to the rest of the hospital via the Institute of Neurological Sciences' link bridge connection with the QEUH.

=== Laboratory ===
The laboratory is directly across Arrival Square from the main hospital entrance, connected via its pedestrian crossing link to bus stances and the car pick up - drop off lane.

The laboratory, which was built in 2012 and has been retained from the Southern General Hospital, provides centralised laboratory services for the whole of Scotland.The building hosts medical laboratory space to support blood sciences, medical genetics, medical pathology and microbiology. It also houses the hospitals facilities management offices and staff. The mortuary is also based here and is located in the basement. The laboratory is staffed by more than 800 people and also undertakes research.

== Transportation ==
The campus features an "Arrival Square" which is located at the front entrance of the adult hospital and is intended to function as the hospital's transport interchange. With patient drop-off zones, access to bus services serving the city and its suburbs, a boardwalk connecting the adult and children's hospitals and a taxi stand. Around 90 buses an hour service the facility. 500 bicycle racks are provided for those cycling to the campus.

The nearest railway station is Cardonald railway station, about 25 minutes walk (just over 1 mile (1.6 km)) to Langlands Drive entrance, and the nearest Glasgow subway station is Govan subway station, about 25 minutes walk (just over 1 mile (1.6 km)) to Govan road entrance, or bus connections can be used from these stations.

== Automated guided vehicles ==
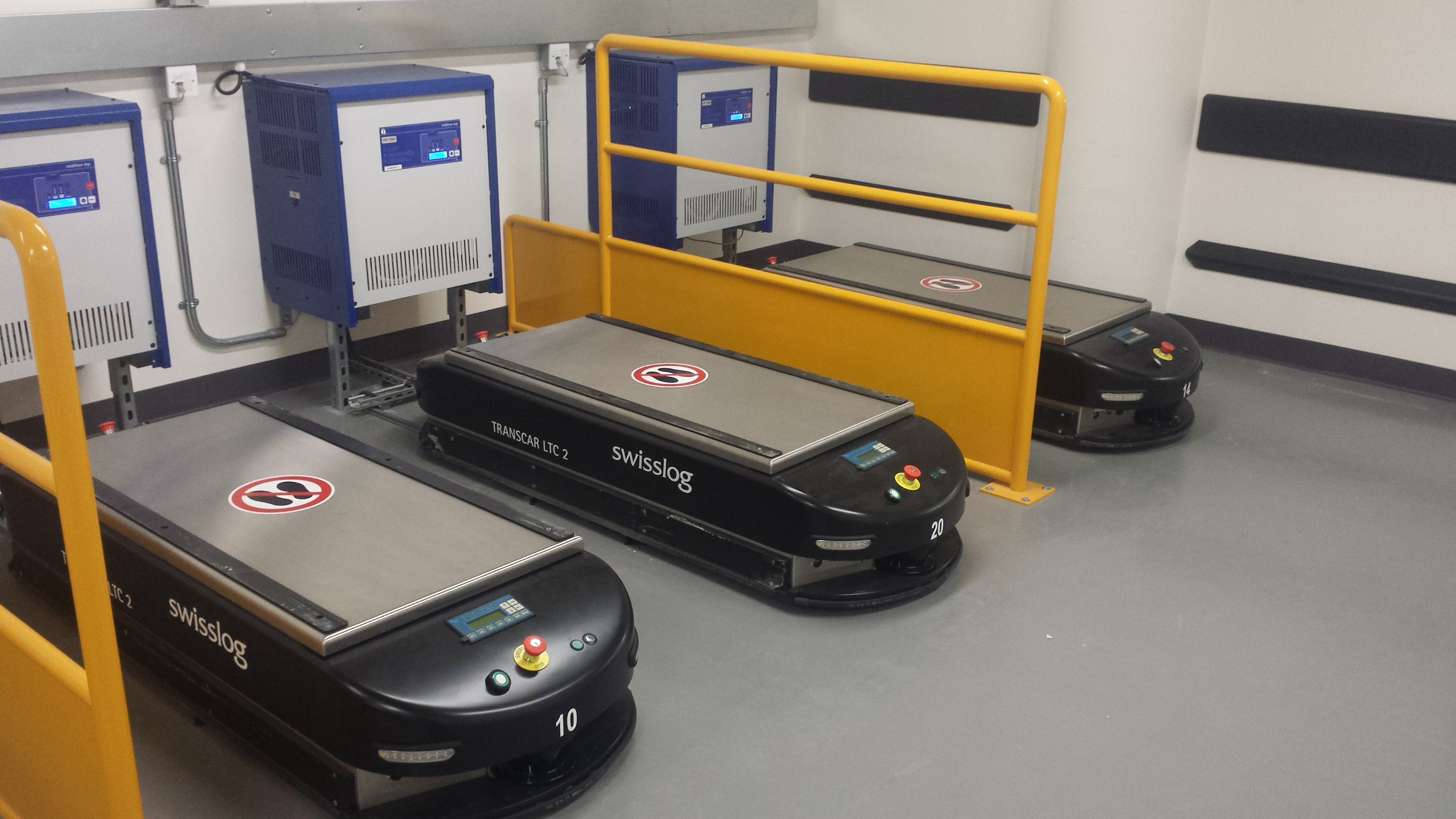
Automated Guided Vehicles charging in the hospital's basement level

The adult, children and laboratory buildings within the hospital are equipped with a fleet of 26 automated guided vehicles (AGVs) to carry supplies, using dedicated lifts and a network of tunnels.

The dedicated lifts that are used by the robots are separated for clean and dirty goods, and the robots travel in non-public corridors located in the basement.
