= West Glasgow Ambulatory Care Hospital =

- NHS Greater Glasgow and Clyde
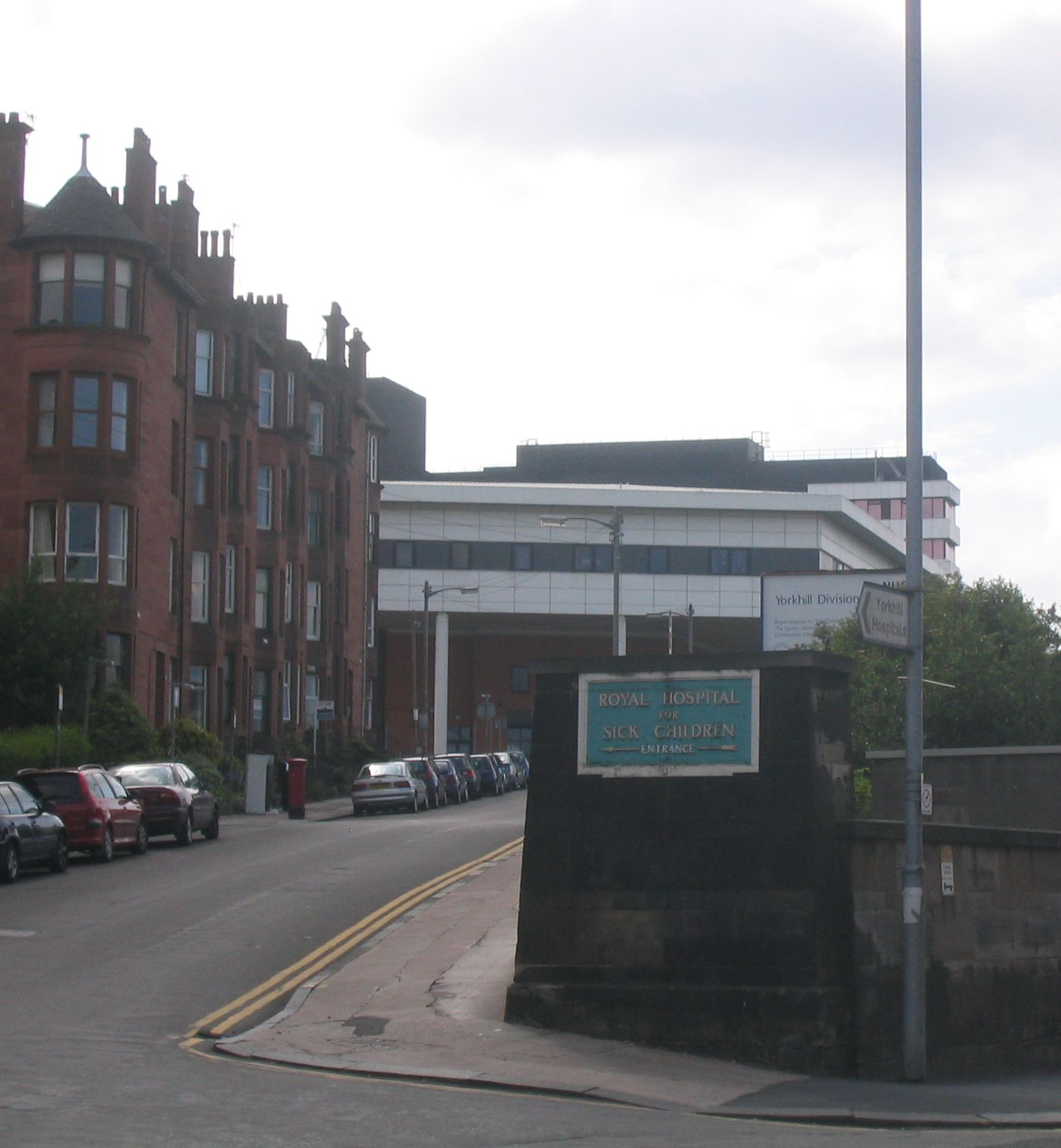
- West Glasgow Ambulatory Care Hospital

- Location within Glasgow

Geography
- Location: Yorkhill, Glasgow, Scotland
- Coordinates: 55°52′00″N 4°17′48″W

Organisation
- Care system: NHS Scotland

Services
- Emergency department: No

History
- Founded: 2015
- Closed: 2025

Links
- Lists: Hospitals in Scotland

The West Glasgow Ambulatory Care Hospital was a healthcare facility in Yorkhill, Glasgow. The new ambulatory care facility was created in December 2015 to house the remaining outpatient services and the minor injury unit previously housed at the Western Infirmary. It was managed by NHS Greater Glasgow and Clyde, before it closed in October 2025.

The building was previously the Royal Hospital for Sick Children, commonly referred to simply as "Yorkhill" or "Sick Kids". The hospital provided care for newborn babies up to children around 13 years of age, including a specialist Accident and Emergency facility and the only Donor Milk Banking facility in Scotland. After services transferred to the Royal Hospital for Children, one of the hospitals build on the Queen Elizabeth University Hospital campus on the Southside of the city, the children's hospital closed in June 2015.

== History ==
The hospital has its origins in a facility at Garnethill which opened as the Hospital for Sick Children on 20 December 1882. It took almost 22 years to come to fruition due to a dispute with the University of Glasgow regarding a suitable site.

When opened, the hospital had 58 beds. It was funded by charitable donations. The hospital admitted its first patient, a 5-year-old boy with curvature of the spine, on 8 January 1883. A further 12 beds were added when Thomas Carlyle converted a house next door into an annexe in 1887. The hospital was given Royal patronage in 1889 when the prefix was added to its title. The old hospital is now occupied by St Aloysius' College.

The hospital was suffering from a chronic lack of space by the 1900s and as a result a new site at Yorkhill was chosen for a replacement hospital building. A public appeal had raised almost £140,000. Designed by John James Burnet, the new building opened in July 1914.

In the 1930s Matthew White started operating on children with cleft lip and cleft palate. He brought in Anne McAllister to administer speech therapy so that the children could make a full recovery.

On 11 July 1964, the Queen Mother's Maternity Hospital opened on a site adjacent to the Royal Hospital for Sick Children. In 1966, the Royal Hospital for Sick Children was temporarily relocated to the former Oakbank Hospital buildings in Woodside in order to facilitate the demolition of the existing building, which was discovered to be suffering from severe structural defects. The move back to the rebuilt facility at Yorkhill began in October 1971 and the hospital was officially opened by the Queen and the Duke of Edinburgh in 1972.

After services transferred to the new Royal Hospital for Children in Govan, the hospital at Yorkhill closed as a children's facility on 10 June 2015.

The hospital building reopened as the West Glasgow Ambulatory Care Hospital on 4 December 2015. The new ambulatory care facility was created to house the remaining outpatient services and the minor injury unit previously housed at the Western Infirmary.

The hospital closed again in October 2025 and the site was subsequently marketed for sale.
