= Oakbank Hospital =

- NHS Greater Glasgow
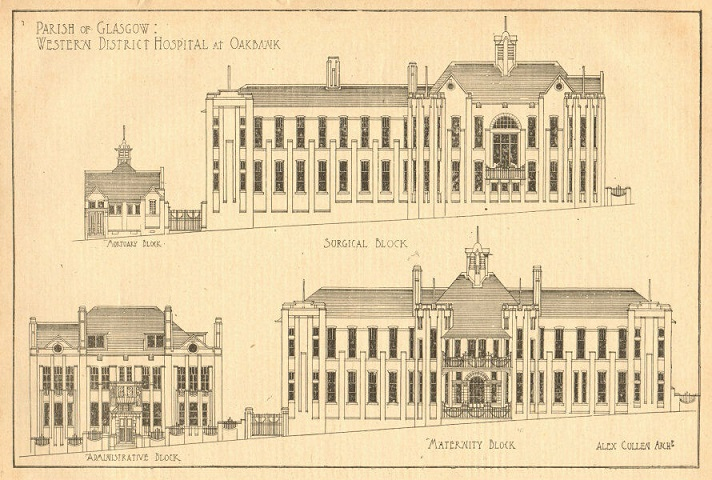
- Architectural drawings for the Oakbank Hospital

- Shown in Glasgow

Geography
- Location: Possil Road, Glasgow, Scotland
- Coordinates: 55.8756°N 4.2618°W

Organisation
- Care system: NHS Scotland
- Type: General

Services
- Emergency department: No

History
- Founded: 1904
- Closed: 1965

Links
- Lists: Hospitals in Scotland

The Oakbank Hospital was a health facility in Possil Road, Glasgow, Scotland.

== History ==
Oakbank was originally a Poor Law hospital, commissioned by the Glasgow Parish Council. The facility, which was designed by Alex Cullen, opened as the Western District Hospital in September 1904, on the same day as Stobhill Hospital in Springburn and the Eastern District Hospital at Duke Street. It joined the National Health Service in 1948 and closed in 1965. The buildings were subsequently used as a temporary facility for the Royal Hospital for Sick Children during reconstruction in the late 1960s and have since been demolished.

== Notable staff ==
The first matron was Eliza Moseley ARRC, working at Oakbank Hospital from 1904 to 1926.
