= Duke Street Hospital =

- NHS Greater Glasgow
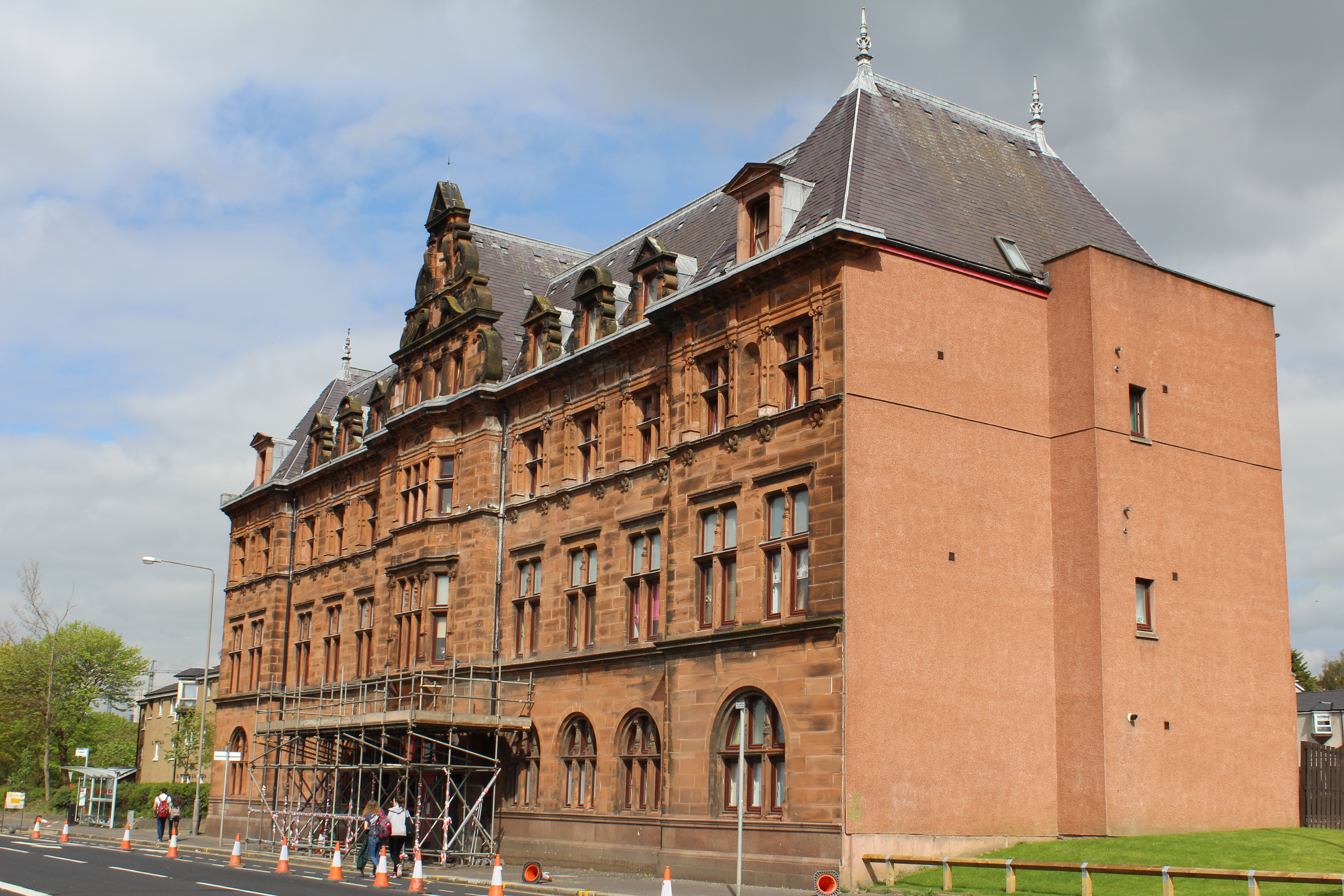
- Duke Street Hospital

- Shown in Glasgow

Geography
- Location: Duke Street, Glasgow, Scotland
- Coordinates: 55.8586°N 4.2262°W

Organisation
- Care system: NHS Scotland
- Type: Geriatric

Services
- Emergency department: No

History
- Founded: 1904
- Closed: 1992

Links
- Lists: Hospitals in Scotland

The Duke Street Hospital was a health facility on Duke Street in Glasgow, Scotland.

== History ==
Duke Street was originally a Poor Law hospital, commissioned by the Glasgow Parish Council. The facility, which was designed by Alfred Hessell Tiltman in the French Renaissance style, was opened as the Eastern District Hospital in September 1904, on the same day as the Western District Hospital at Oakbank in Maryhill and Stobhill Hospital in Springburn. A new maternity unit was completed in the 1940s and it joined the National Health Service in 1948. Physiotherapy and premature baby units were added in the 1960s.

When maternity services transferred to Rutherglen Maternity Hospital in 1977, the hospital became a geriatric facility. After services had transferred to Parkhead Hospital, it closed in 1992. The main building, which is Category B listed, was converted to residential use in the 2000s, having lain empty for some years.
