= John Graham-Gilbert =

Scottish portrait painter and art collector

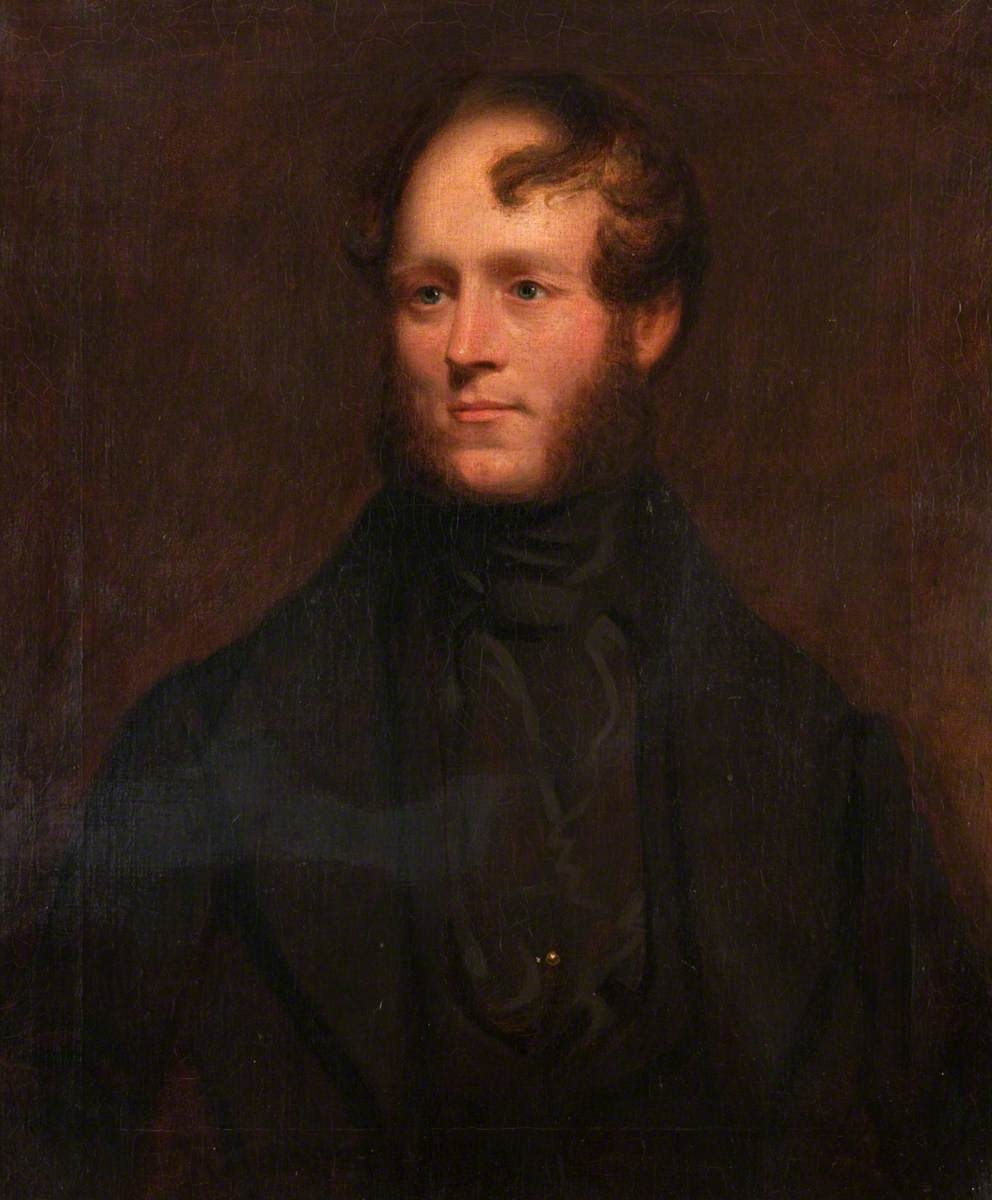
- Self-portrait, 1821
- Born: 1794; Glasgow
- Died: 4 June 1866 (aged 71–72); Yorkhill

John Graham-Gilbert (1794 – 4 June 1866) was a Scottish portrait painter and art collector.

== Life ==
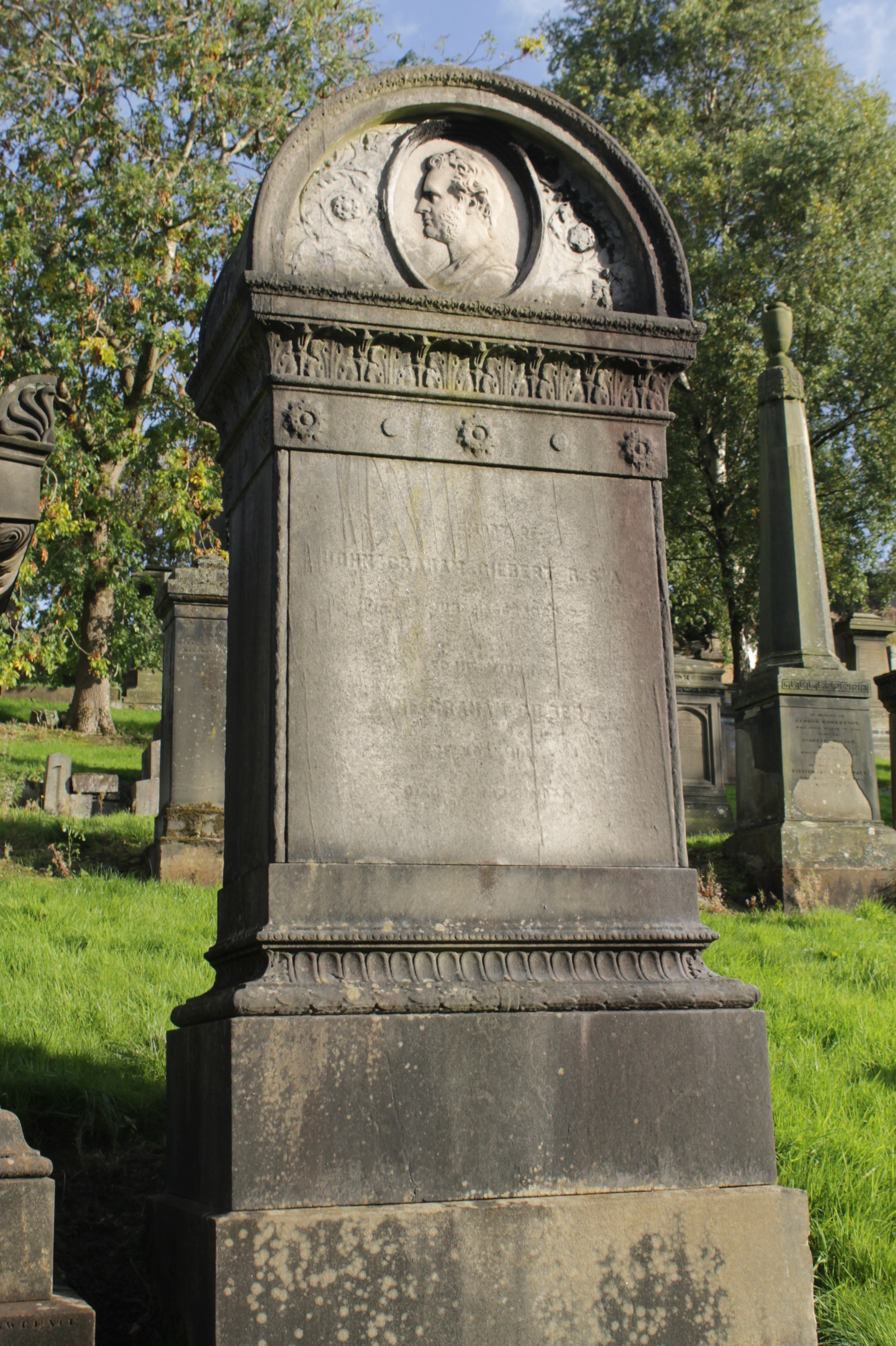
The grave of John Graham Gilbert, Glasgow Necropolis

Graham-Gilbert was born in Glasgow as John Graham, the son of David Graham a West India merchant and co-owner of Graham, Milne & Co who owned a counting house (accountants) on Queen Strett. John was at first trained in his father's counting-house, but preferred art and travelled to London in 1818 where he was admitted into the Royal Academy. In 1819 he won a silver medal for best drawing from the antique, and in 1821 a gold medal for his historical painting of ‘The Prodigal Son.’ He established himself in London as a portrait-painter, and contributed to the exhibitions of the Royal Academy from 1820 to 1823. He then went to Italy to study old masters of the Venetian school.

He settled in Edinburgh in 1827, living at 14 George Street in the New town. He sent a portrait to the first exhibition of the Royal Scottish Academy. In 1834 he married the wealthy heiress Jane Gilbert of Yorkhill. He added her name to his, and moved to her native Glasgow. He remained an exhibitor at the Royal Scottish Academy, but from 1844 he also exhibited at the Royal Academy in London.

He died at Yorkhill House in north-west Glasgow on 4 June 1866. He is buried on the northern slope of the Glasgow Necropolis. Jane Graham-Gilbert died on 22 March 1877, and left dozens of artworks to Glasgow, including work by Rembrandt.

Yorkhill House was demolished around 1910 to make way for the Hospital for Sick children.

== Family ==
In 1834, on marriage to Jane Gilbert (1801–1877), daughter of Andrew Gilbert a rich Glasgow merchant, he thereafter called himself John Graham-Gilbert. Through this marriage he inherited Yorkhill House from his father-in-law.

== Trivia ==
The counting house where Graham Gilbert trained still exists on the corner of Queen Street and St Vincent Street. Now a bar, it is called The Counting House and is relatively intact both inside and out.

== Works ==
Portrait of Colonel William Farquhar, c. 1828

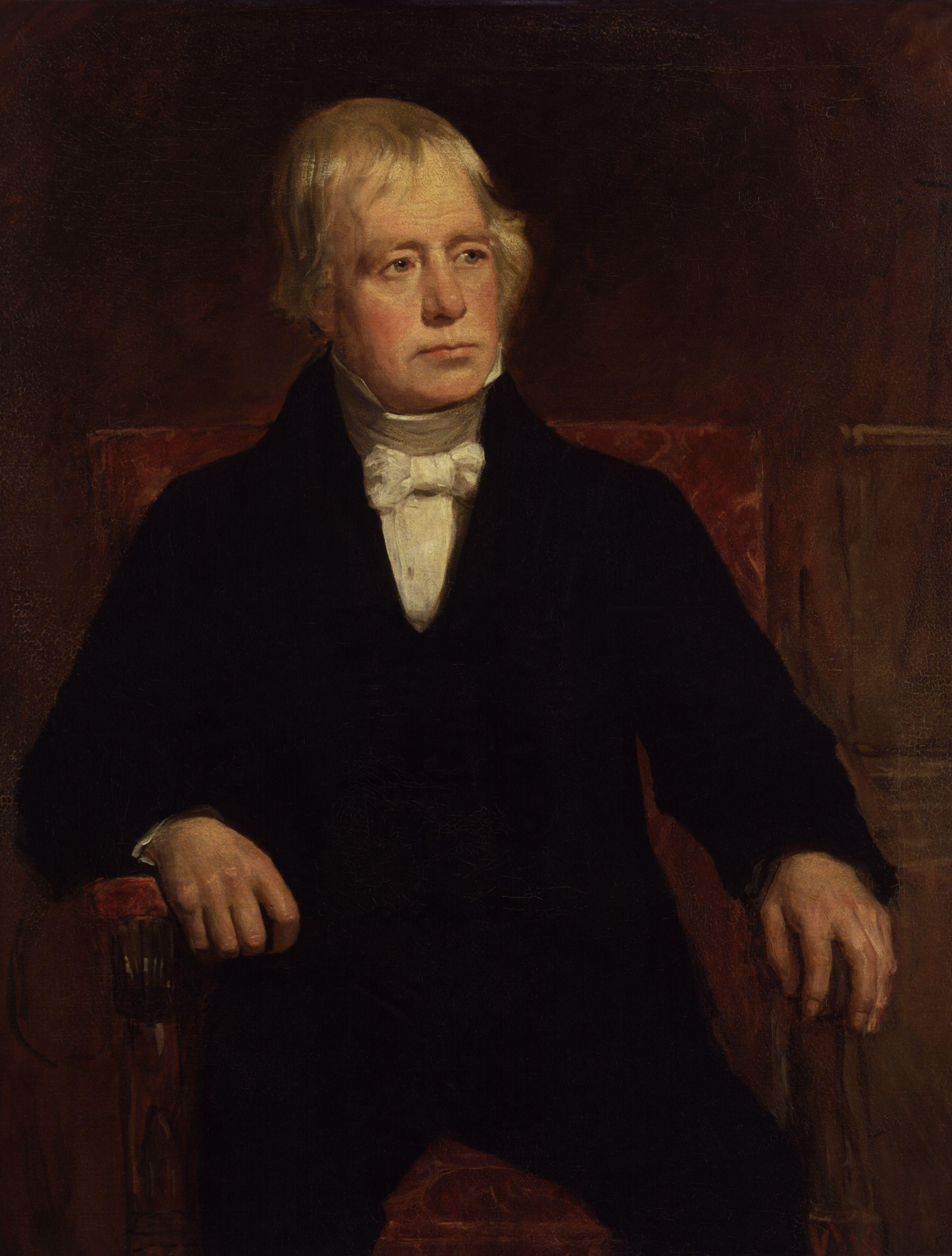
Portrait of Scottish historical novelist Sir Walter Scott, 1st Bt, 1829

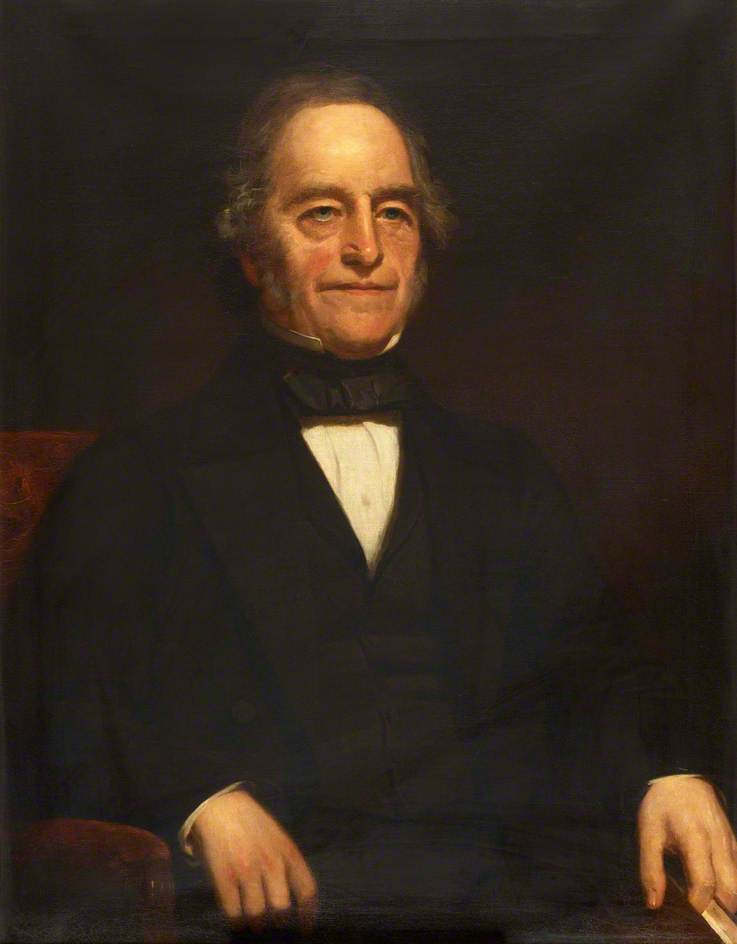
Portrait of the merchant Adam Black

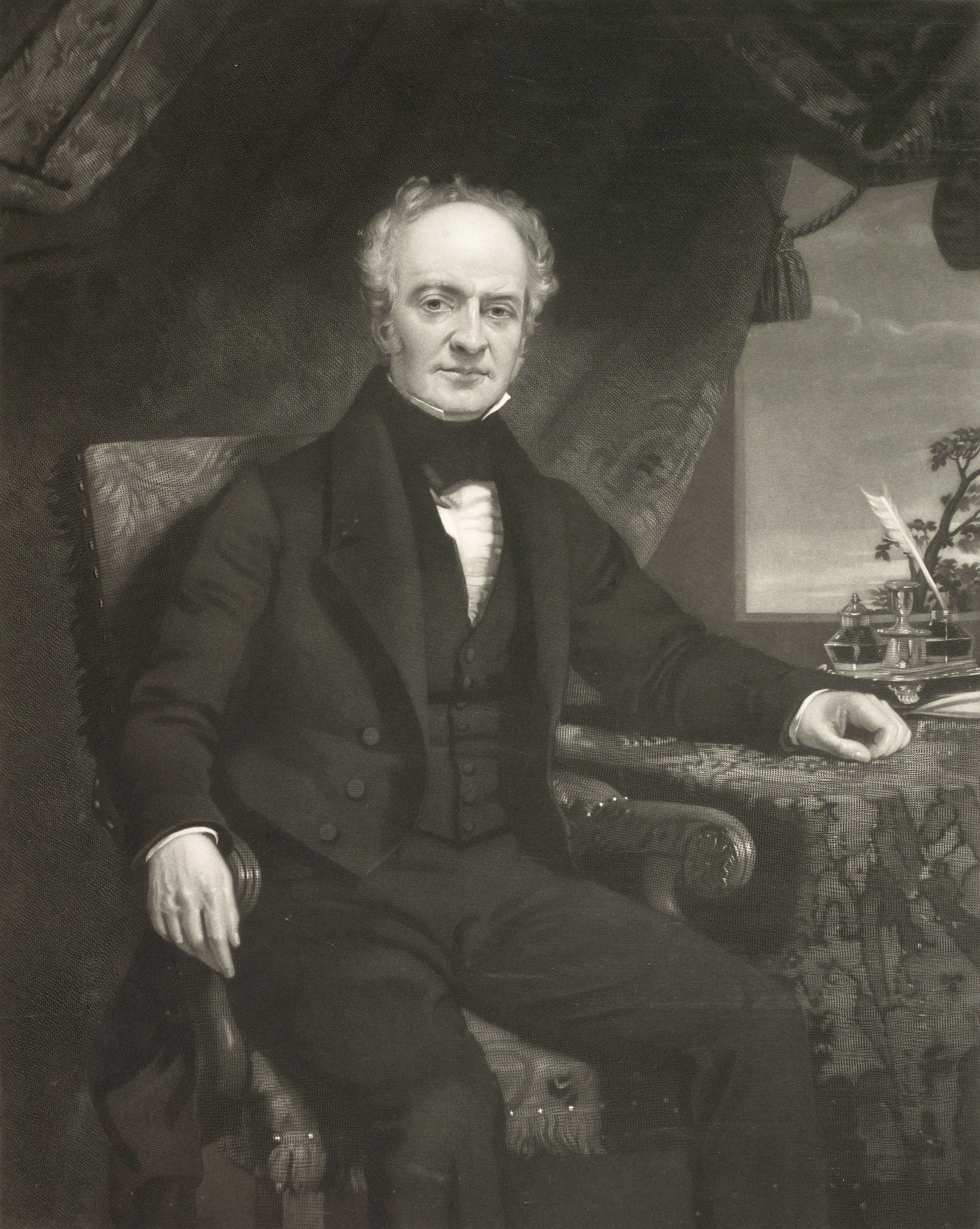
Liverpool merchant Charles Horsfall, engraved by Edward Burton from a painting by Graham-Gilbert

== Art collection ==
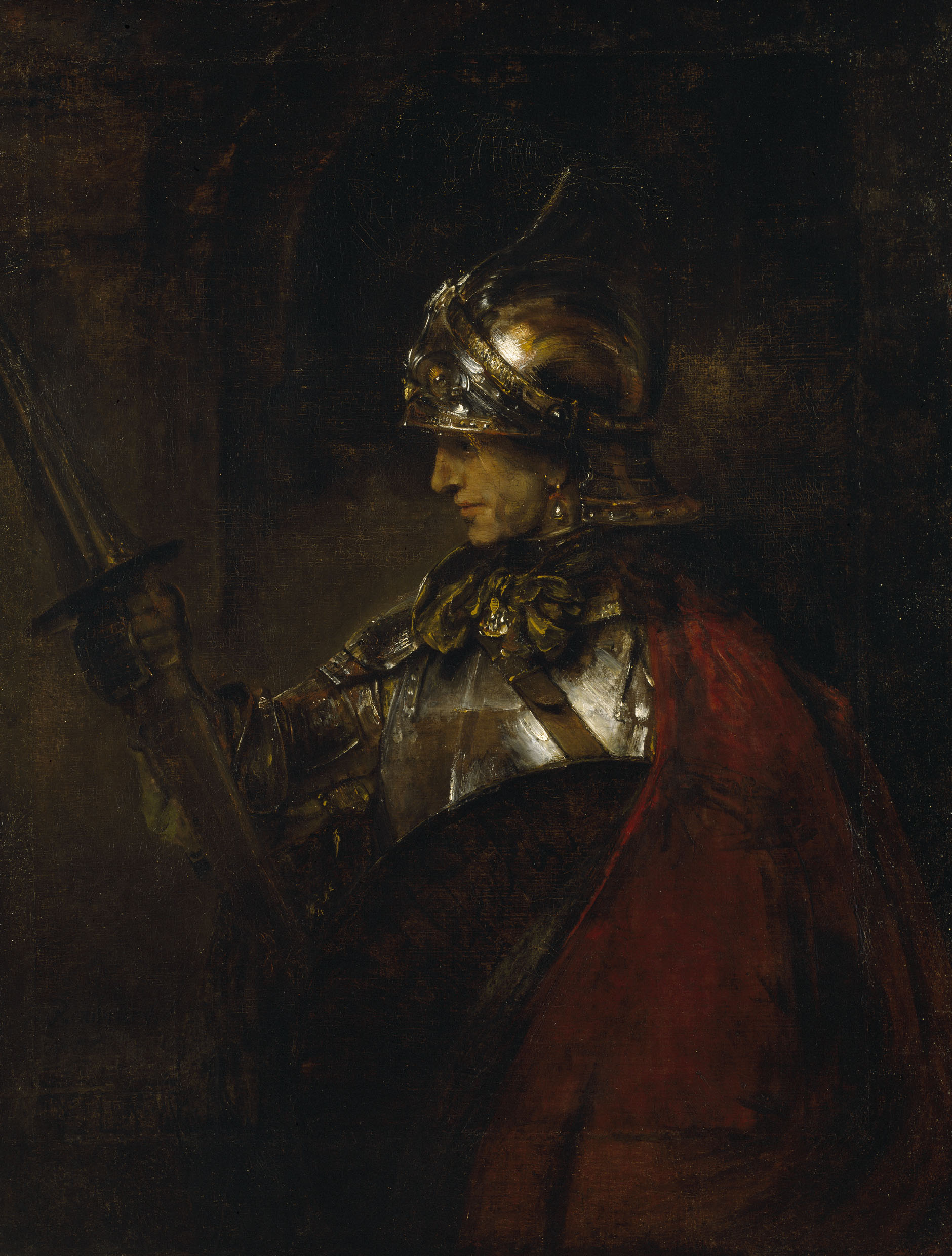
Man in Armour, by Rembrandt

His widow Jane Graham-Gilbert, who died in 1877, bequeathed to the Corporation Galleries of Art at Glasgow a small collection left to her by her husband, together with a number of his own pictures, totalling 70 paintings. These include works by Palma Vecchio, Gaspard Dughet, Paris Bordone and Dutch masters such as Rembrandt, Johannes Lingelbach, Nicolaes Eliasz. Pickenoy, Philips Wouwerman, Willem van de Velde the Younger and Ludolf Bakhuizen that are considered highlights of the Kelvingrove Art Gallery and Museum.
