= Duke Street Prison =

Coordinates: 55.8605°N 4.2354°W

- Interactive map of the Duke Street Prison area
- Alternative names: Bridewell; Northern Prison; North Prison

General information
- Opened: 1798
- Demolished: 1958

Duke Street Prison (also known as Bridewell or the Northern or North Prison) was one of eight prisons which served Glasgow and its surrounding area prior to the mid nineteenth century. An early example of the 'separate system', it was noted in 1841 that Duke Street Prison was Scotland's only 'well managed prison'.

Duke Street Prison received its first inmates in 1798. The passing in 1839 of An Act to Improve Prisons and Prison Discipline started the creation of a centralised prison system which resulted in the closure of many of Scotland's smaller prisons. Between 1839 and 1862, seven of Glasgow's prisons were closed, leaving only the Duke Street Prison. Further legislation in 1860 and 1877 brought the management of Scottish prisons under the control of the state and led to the building of larger prison complexes. After 1882, male prisoners from Duke Street were moved to the newly built prison HM Prison Barlinnie in the Eastern suburbs of Glasgow. Duke Street Prison then operated as a women's prison until 1955. In 1946 it was the first women's prison in Scotland to appoint a woman, the Hon Victoria Alexandrina Katherine Bruce as Governor.

The building was demolished in 1958 to eventually make way for the Ladywell housing scheme which was built on the site from 1961–1964 and stands till this day. The only remaining structure of Duke Street Prison is some of the boundary wall.

Living conditions within the prison became the subject of a Glasgow street song, sung to the tune of 'There Is a Happy Land'.

There is a happy land,
doon Duke Street Jail,
Where a' the prisoners stand,
tied tae a nail.
Ham an' eggs they never see,
dirty watter fur yer tea;
there they live in misery
God Save the Queen!

== Suffragettes and political activists ==
As Duke Street prison held women prisoners from around Scotland, many suffragettes and political activists were imprisoned here, and their protests at the living conditions contributed towards the move to close the prison in 1955. Activist Wendy Wood, an early campaigner for Scottish independence, was imprisoned at Duke Street for 60 days for refusing to pay National Insurance. Following her incarceration there, Wood became an active campaigner for prison reform and she lobbied authorities until the closure of the prison in 1955.

On 24 July 1913 suffragettes Ethel Moorhead and Dorothea Chalmers Smith were arrested during an attempt to set fire to an unoccupied mansion house at 6 Park Gardens, Glasgow, and were taken to Duke Street Prison. Moorhead, who used a number of aliases, gave her name as 'Margaret Morrison'. Moorhead used her shoe to smash three cell windows and knocked the prison governor's hat off his head when he refused to remove it despite being in the presence of a lady. Moorhead wrote a letter to the prison commissioners, claiming that she and other suffragette prisoners were not being treated as political prisoners, and both women went on hunger strike. Ethel Moorhead was released on bail and Dorothea Smith was released under the Prisoners (Temporary Discharge for Ill Health) Act 1913, better known as the Cat and Mouse Act, on 29 July 1913 with a return date of 5 August 1913, but she did not return by that date.

The case came to trial on 15 October 1913. Both women were sentenced to eight months imprisonment and found themselves back in Duke Street Prison, and went on hunger strike again. They were both released on temporary discharge on 20 October 1913 following a medical officer's report which stated that Ethel Moorhead was in an extremely feeble physical condition and that Dorothea Smith was very weak. Both women failed to return before the expiry of their licence on 27 October. Dorothea Smith was reported to be in her home, but Ethel Moorhead's whereabouts were unknown. Amidst rumours that Dorothea was pregnant, she was thereafter ordered to be kept under police surveillance in her home, though she later escaped. Moorhead was recaptured in Peebles the following February and sent to prison in Edinburgh.

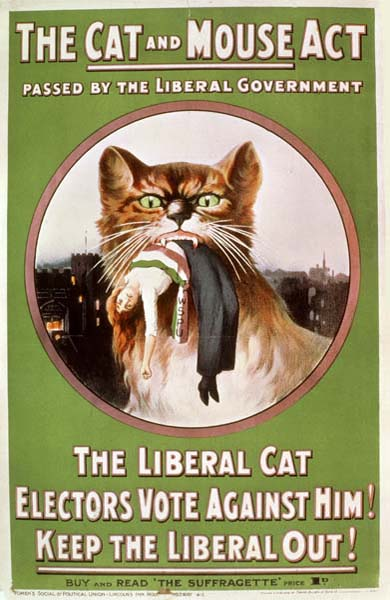
WSPU Poster from 1914 protesting against the implementation of the Prisoners (Temporary Discharge for Ill Health) Act 1913.

Helen Crawfurd Anderson was imprisoned in Duke Street Prison in March 1914 after breaking two windows of the Army Recruiting Office in Gallowgate, as a protest against the arrest two days previously of Mrs Pankhurst. Helen was sentenced to ten days in prison but went on hunger strike and was released after eight days under the Prisoners (Temporary Discharge for Ill Health) Act 1913. She was then rearrested and returned to prison, but again released, in a very weak physical condition, after a second hunger strike. Members of the Women's Social and Political Union gathered at the prison gates and were noted as picketing the prison day and night during her incarceration. On 16 March 1914 suffragette Jean Lambie attacked Dr James Devon, Prison Commissioner, as he entered the prison, striking him in the face with a horsewhip. She then delivered an address on force-feeding to the crowd outside the prison.

A cast iron umbrella stand, painted pink, green and white by suffragettes imprisoned at Duke Street, is among the collections at Glasgow Women's Library. The stand was at one time kept in the office of a prison Governess who was a suffragette sympathiser. It was donated to the library by a former social worker at the prison who had salvaged it from a skip. The umbrella stand was the inspiration for a short story, The Mouse's Umbrella, by Scottish writer Donna Moore, which is featured in a podcast on the Glasgow Women's Library website.

== Executions ==
A total of 12 judicial executions by hanging were carried out at the prison between 1902 and 1928. All those executed had been convicted of the crime of murder. The list of executed criminals includes Susan Newell, the last woman to be executed in Scotland and at the time the first in over 50 years, who was hanged after being convicted of strangling a paper boy.

| Execution date | Condemned prisoner | Murder victim |
|---|---|---|
| 12/11/1902 | Patrick Leggett | Sarah Jane Leggett |
| 26/07/1904 | Thomas Gunning | Agnes Allen |
| 14/11/1905 | Pasha Liffey | Mary Jane Welsh |
| 16/05/1917 | Thomas McGuiness | Alexander Imlach |
| 11/11/1919 | James Adams | Mary Doyle (Kane) |
| 26/05/1920 | Albert James Fraser | Henry Senior |
| 26/05/1920 | James Rollins | Henry Senior |
| 21/02/1922 | William Harkness | Elizabeth Benjamin |
| 10/10/1923 | Susan Newell | John Johnstone |
| 24/09/1925 | John Keen | Noorh Mohammed |
| 24/01/1928 | James McKay | Agnes Arbuckle |
| 03/08/1928 | George Reynolds | Thomas Lee |

Some views of Duke Street Prison, taken in 1955, were included among those taken by Partick Camera Clubs and other clubs involved in a project to create a photographic record of Glasgow at that time. The photographs were then displayed in various exhibitions throughout Glasgow and are now part of the Glasgow Museums Collections.
