= Anne McAllister (speech therapist) =

(1892–1983), Scottish speech therapist and teacher

- in 1937
- Born: 29 November 1892; Biggar
- Died: 5 April 1983 (aged 90); Glasgow
- Occupation: Speech therapist

Academic background
- Education: Glasgow University

Anne Hutchison McAllister FRCSLT OBE (29 November 1892 – 5 April 1983) was a leading Scottish speech therapist and teacher.

== Life ==
McAllister was born in Biggar in Lanarkshire in 1892. Her father Robert Dempster McAllister was married to Anne Huchison McAllister. She took a first and then master's degree (in 1917) at Glasgow University.

She became a lecturer in phonetics at Stow College She became a lecturer at Jordanhill College of Education and an experienced speech therapist. In 1924 she obtained a B.Ed. from her alma mater. In 1935 she created the Glasgow School of Speech Therapy and she became its first director. The following year she established speech therapy for children who had undergone surgery to fix Cleft lip and cleft palates at Glasgow's Royal Hospital for Sick Children. This was following an invitation by Matthew White who was the surgeon carrying out the surgery.

In 1937 she published Clinical Studies in Speech Therapy which described her study of 21,000 children in Dumbartonshire and their speech problems. The survey also presented some advice and McAllister stressed the importance of a dual approach of psychology and reeducation.

She became a founding fellow of the College of Speech Therapists (now the Royal College of Speech and Language Therapists) in London in 1945. Allister was appointed an OBE in 1954. In 1964 she stood down from being the director of the Glasgow School of Speech Therapy. McAllister was a Soroptimist and a member of the Glasgow Club.

McAllister died in Glasgow in 1983.
