= Rutherglen Maternity Hospital =

- NHS Lanarkshire
- Shown in South Lanarkshire

Geography
- Location: Stonelaw Road, Rutherglen, Scotland
- Coordinates: 55.8242°N 4.2098°W

Organisation
- Care system: NHS Scotland
- Type: Maternity

Services
- Emergency department: No

History
- Founded: 1978
- Closed: 1998

Links
- Lists: Hospitals in Scotland

Rutherglen Maternity Hospital was a women and children's hospital in Stonelaw Road, Rutherglen, South Lanarkshire, Scotland.

== History ==
Until the 1970s, maternity services in Rutherglen were provided at the Duke Street Hospital. The foundation stone for the new hospital was laid by a gynaecologist, Sir Hector McLennan, in June 1973. The new building was designed by Frank Campbell. The local member of parliament, Gregor Mackenzie, welcomed the first babies born there in 1978 and it was officially opened by Princess Alexandra on 18 May 1979. After 56,000 babies had been born there, it closed on 1 August 1998 in order to consolidate maternity services at fewer locations, on the same site as emergency treatment – despite local opposition to the closure in the preceding years.

The site is now occupied by a complex of retirement apartments and an extension of the local health centre, the older part of which was built at the same time as the hospital, replacing Rutherglen's older clinic on King Street.
