= NHS Argyll and Clyde =

Former health board area

- Established: 2004
- Disbanded: 2006
- Region served: Argyll and Bute, East Renfrewshire, West Dunbartonshire
- Area size: 32,500 square kilometres (12,500 sq mi)
- Population: 423,500
- Hospitals: List of hospitals in Scotland

NHS Argyll and Clyde was a former Health Board of the Scottish National Health Service in western Scotland.

It was responsible for an annual budget of £434 million, serving a population of 423,500 people.

== History ==
In 2002 four executives resigned after a report identified serious failures in their management.

With the board carrying large debts, the Scottish Executive announced in May 2005 that they would consult on dissolving the health board. A consultation began in August 2005 on proposals to redraw the boundaries of NHS Argyll and Clyde. On 8 December 2005, health minister Andy Kerr said that the health board would be split.

On 31 March 2006, NHS Argyll and Clyde was dissolved. Its assets and liabilities and the responsibilities for delivering health services were transferred to the two successor boards, NHS Highland and NHS Greater Glasgow and Clyde. NHS Highland's boundary was changed to include the area of Argyll and Bute Council. The remainder of the area of the dissolved Board joined NHS Greater Glasgow, and following this amalgamation has been known as NHS Greater Glasgow and Clyde.
