= MediCinema =

UK-based charity

MediCinema is a UK-based registered charity that builds, installs and manages state-of-the-art cinemas, screening the latest releases the film industry has to offer in hospitals and health facilities. MediCinema was founded by Christine Hill MBE.

MediCinema has six cinemas that are located in health facilities around the UK and provided vital support to over 16,000 patients and families last year (2014). The charity also provides separate nursing care to ensure patients have the best and safest experience while in the cinema. Current MediCinemas are based at the St Thomas' Hospital in London, England, Serenau Children's Centre in Newport, Wales, Royal Hospital for Children in Glasgow, Defence Medical Rehabilitation Centre at Headley Court, Guy's Hospital, London and Chelsea & Westminster Hospital, London due to open in 2015. The cinemas are made wheelchair accessible and the majority allow for beds to be wheeled in for the viewing.

== What they do ==
MediCinema is a charity that screens films for patients during their hospital stay. For instance, since 1999, St Thomas' Hospital in London, England has shown films regularly in a cinema that seats 100 people and can accommodate 10 wheelchairs and 6 beds. It has a big screen and Dolby surround sound and shows films for adults and children, including family members. It allows patients to leave their wards and provides entertainment that lightens their spirits. Film distributors often make films available to MediCinema before the films have been released for the general public, for fund-raising and MediCinema viewings, such Big Hero 6, Harry Potter and the Philosopher's Stone and Skyfall. The cinema is free to the patients, care-givers and families, with MediCinema nurses providing medical supervision during the screenings.

== Cinema complexes ==
MediCinema is a charity that screens films for patients during their hospital stay. For instance, since 1999, St Thomas' Hospital in London has shown films regularly in a cinema that seats 100 people and can accommodate 10 wheelchairs and 6 beds. Their purpose built screens show up to date film releases, donated by the film industry for free, and are fully digitalised with 3D screen and Dolby Surround Sound provided by RealD. The screens are built to accommodate patients in wheelchairs, beds, on drips or monitors so everyone can enjoy the joy and escapism of cinema. By providing ‘Cinematherapy’ in this safe, stimulating, relaxing and sociable environment, MediCinema goers can escape the isolation of their wards and illness, and enjoy a few hours of normality and fun with their family and loved ones. Admission is free of charge for all inpatients and outpatients on a regular programme of treatment, and Patients are encouraged to bring family members or carers along to share the experience together.

The Royal British Legion MediCinema was opened at the Defence Medical Rehabilitation Centre at Headley Court on September 27, 2012 for people in the military service who had sustained injuries. Funding of up to £420,000 for the "fully digital, 3D" cinema was provided by The Royal British Legion, and additional monies were provided by Medicinema supporters, such as actor Simon Pegg who attended the opening. The complex is intended to screen films up to 3 times per week in the 50 seat, wheelchair accessible cinema. It can also be used to view sports and other programmes and as a big screen game console. The Health and Welfare Director at the Royal British Legion, Sue Freeth, stated "Rehabilitation is not only a huge physical challenge, but involves recuperating mentally as well. This excellent new facility will assist our brave Service personnel in doing just that."

MediCinema has partnered with 3D technologies RealD to equip hospital cinemas with ReadD 3D. They have worked together on the Defence Medical Rehabilitation Center at Headley Court and the Royal Hospital for Sick Children in Glasgow. London's Guy's Hospital and Chelsea and Westminster Hospital will also receive cinemas with RealD Cinema technology. The existing St. Thomas' Hospital MediCinema in London was also outfitted with RealD 3D.

MediCinema is also proudly supported by the film industry, which provides free of charge access to premieres and star studded events to support our Red Carpet Club.

Other early hospital cinemas were implemented in Serennu Children's Centre in Newport and Royal Hospital for Children in Glasgow.

== Clinical outcomes ==
Beyond the entertainment value of leaving isolated hospital wards to view films, it is increasingly believed that patient's recovery is improved by viewing "feel-good" films, or ones that make the patient laugh.

"Laughter is the best medicine and we intend to administer it through cinema. This is a superb initiative which I'm sure will do a great deal to boost patients' motivation to get well," said Dr. Alan Maryon-Davis, a top health consultant.

== Supporters ==
MediCinema receives its funding from corporate sponsors, fund-raising events, grants, public donations and sponsorship. MediCinema are not NHS funded in any way (Note: The organization has a wide range of private and organisational supporters, many related to the film industry.) Early supporters included Pearl & Dean, a cinema advertising firm; Warner Village; and UGC Cinemas. Pearl and Dean's fundraising provided the monies to open the cinema at the Yorkhill Children's Hospital. Warner Village and UGC screened commercials with Ewan McGregor for MediCinema, to raise £250,000 for the construction of the cinema complex at the Royal Children's Hospital in Glasgow, Scotland's largest children's hospital. McGregor is one of the organisation's patrons.

The Walt Disney Company, Vue Entertainment, Warner Brothers, 20th Century Fox and film distributors are key sponsors.

It has been named by British Academy of Film and Television Arts (BAFTA) as the film industry's charity. Kate Winslet, Ewan McGregor and Dame Helen Mirren are just a few of the patrons of MediCinema. In 2025, it was awarded the Outstanding British Contribution to Cinema Award at the BAFTA Film Awards.
