= Collegelands =

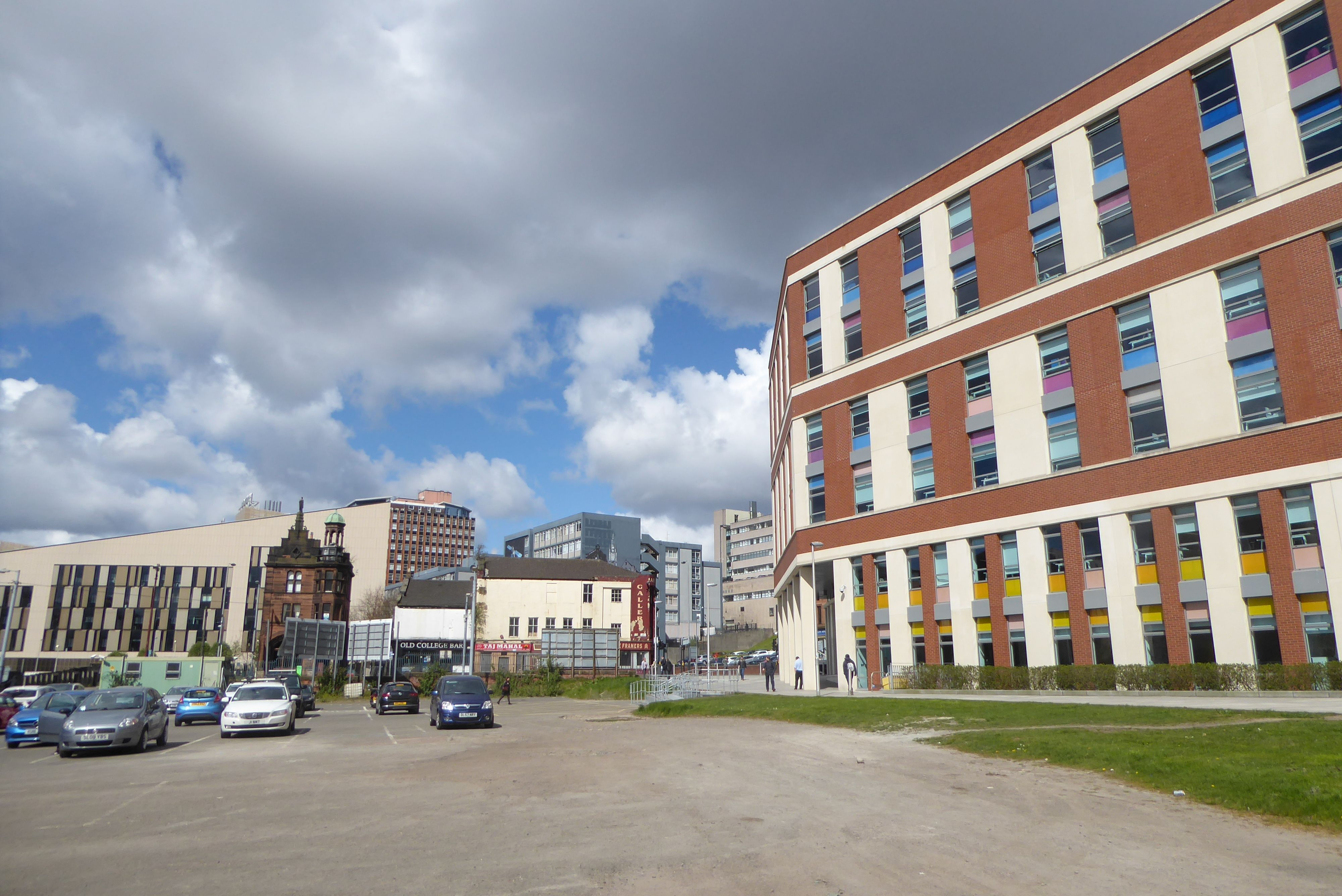
- Interactive map of the Collegelands area

General information
- Status: Completed
- Type: Residential
- Location: 10 Hannavah Street, Glasgow, Scotland
- Coordinates: 55°51′33″N 4°14′22″W
- Opened: August 2012
- Cost: £29,600,000
- Client: Watkin Jones Group

Technical details
- Floor count: 9
- Grounds: 17,932 m^{2} (193,020 sq ft)

Design and construction
- Architecture firm: Manson Architects

Other information
- Number of rooms: 588
- Parking: Yes

Collegelands is part of a £200 million development project in the heart of Glasgow, Scotland. At the time of its opening in 2012, it was one of the largest regeneration projects in the United Kingdom.

The location, close to the original site of the University of Glasgow, takes up 100,000 square metres (1.1 million square feet) on the corner of Duke Street and High Street. Collegelands, latterly known as the College Goods Railway Yard, is Glasgow's first new city centre quarter in several years. The margin wall of the former College Goods Yard railway station on Duke Street has been reserved, in affirmation to the history of the site. The existing High Street railway station is directly to the west of the development.

The development has been created through a partnership between Glasgow City Council and Watkin Dawn Group.

This development comprises 588 student study bedrooms including 565 en-suite bedrooms and 23 self-contained studio flats over nine storeys, with some ground floor retail units. Within the buildings footmark two courtyards were formed. It is situated on Havannah Street. Collegelands accommodates over 400 undergraduate and postgraduate University of Strathclyde students.

The facility is managed by Fresh Student Living which houses over 12,000 students in over 40 university and college locations across the UK.

The development has attracted criticism from commentators for its unremarkable construction style in an area of high local aesthetic and historic value.
