= Clinical trials unit =

Specialised biomedical research unit

Clinical trials units (CTU) are specialised biomedical research units which design, centrally coordinate and analyse clinical trials and other studies. Some CTUs specialise in different methodologies, such as randomised controlled trials, cluster randomised trials, surgical trials, and health services research. Some specialise in one disease type, whereas others are generic units. Some CTUs focus on specific phases and types of clinical trials; others conduct all phases and types of trial.

== United Kingdom ==
The UKCRC evaluates CTUs in the UK and they may be given either Full or Provisional CTU registration status. All Registered CTUs are required to provide evidence that their work is of high quality by demonstrating (1) experience of coordinating multi-centre randomised controlled trials or other well-designed studies, (2) a presence of a core team of expert staff to develop studies, (3) a presence of robust quality assurance systems and processes to meet appropriate regulations and legislation, and (4) evidence of longer-term viability of capacity for trials coordination and the development/maintenance of a trials portfolio.

Provisional CTUs tend to be newer and evolving CTUs and have not yet built a track record but have relevant expertise and experience that is worth building on. Evaluation criteria for Provisional Registration were developed for CTUs that did not meet the criteria for Full Registration status, but that are working towards possessing sufficient expertise to enable Full Registration in the future.

Medicinal clinical trials are only a subset of all trials undertaken by Registered Clinical Trials Units in the academic sector. Such Units may also specialise in surgical trials, therapy trials and other complex interventions such as educational interventions.

In the United Kingdom, clinical trials of medicines are approved by the Medicines and Healthcare products Regulatory Agency. This it does through its Clinical Trials Unit, which enforces standards through the Good Clinical Practice Inspectorate. In 2007, a revised version of Phase I clinical trial regulations was issued following the heavily publicized multiple organ failures in several volunteers for a study of TGN1412.
