= Victoria Alexandrina Katherine Bruce =

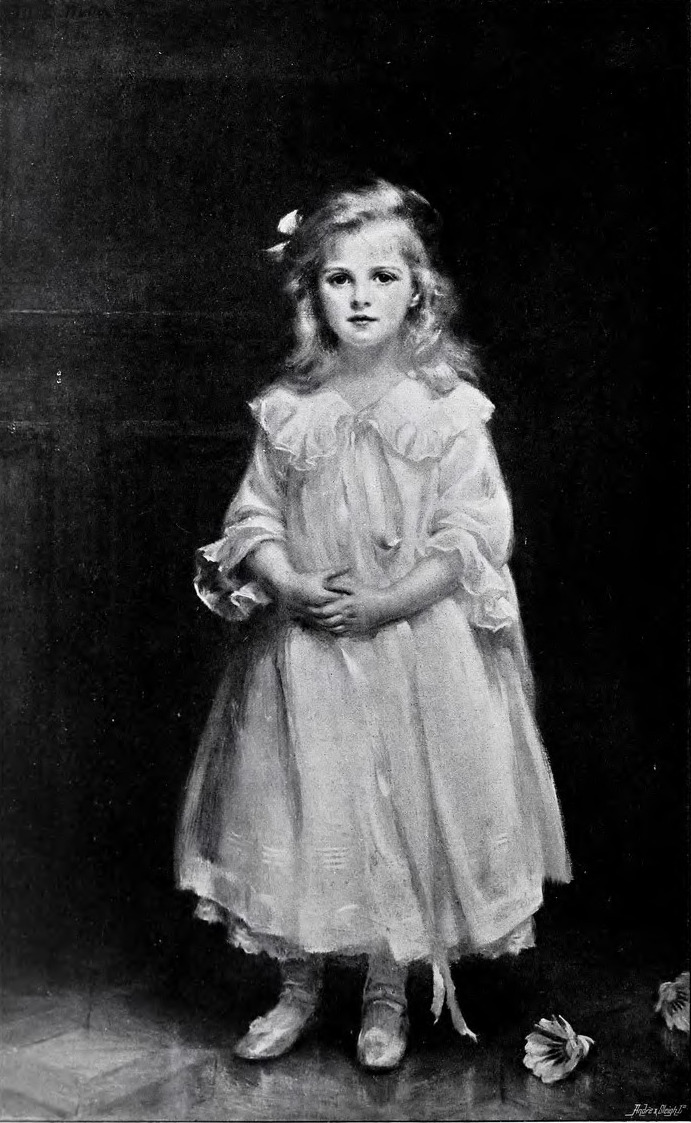
- childhood portrait by Mary Lemon Waller
- Born: 13 September 1898; Clackmannan
- Died: 25 November 1951 (aged 53); Glasgow
- Occupation: Prison warden
- Parent(s): Alexander Bruce, 6th Lord Balfour of Burleigh; Katherine Eliza Hamilton-Gordon

The Honourable Victoria Alexandrina Katherine Bruce (1898–1951) was the first woman to be appointed governor of a Scottish woman's prison in 1946 when she became governor of Duke Street Prison in Glasgow.

Victoria Alexandrina Katherine Bruce was born 13 September 1898 at Kennet House in Clackmannan, Scotland. She was the daughter of Alexander Hugh Bruce, 6th Lord Balfour of Burleigh, and Lady Katherine Eliza Gordon.

She became interested in social work and worked as a voluntary librarian in the boy's wing of HM Prison Wandsworth between 1928 and 1931. She was then appointed as a Probation Officer in the juvenile courts in London.

In 1937, Bruce was appointed as deputy governor of the Aylesbury Borstal. She then moved to Manchester to be the deputy governor of Strangeways prison.

In 1943, she was appointed the governor of the women's borstal at Aylesbury. She introduced a 'house' system, modelled on English public schools.

In 1946, she was appointed governor of Duke Street Prison in Glasgow.

She died on 25 November 1951 in her quarters at Duke Street Prison and was buried at Clackmannan in Scotland.
