= Yorkhill =

Area of Glasgow, Scotland

Coordinates: 55.871075°N 4.298167°W

Yorkhill: Scottish Gaelic: Cnoc Eabhraig; Scots: Yorkhull
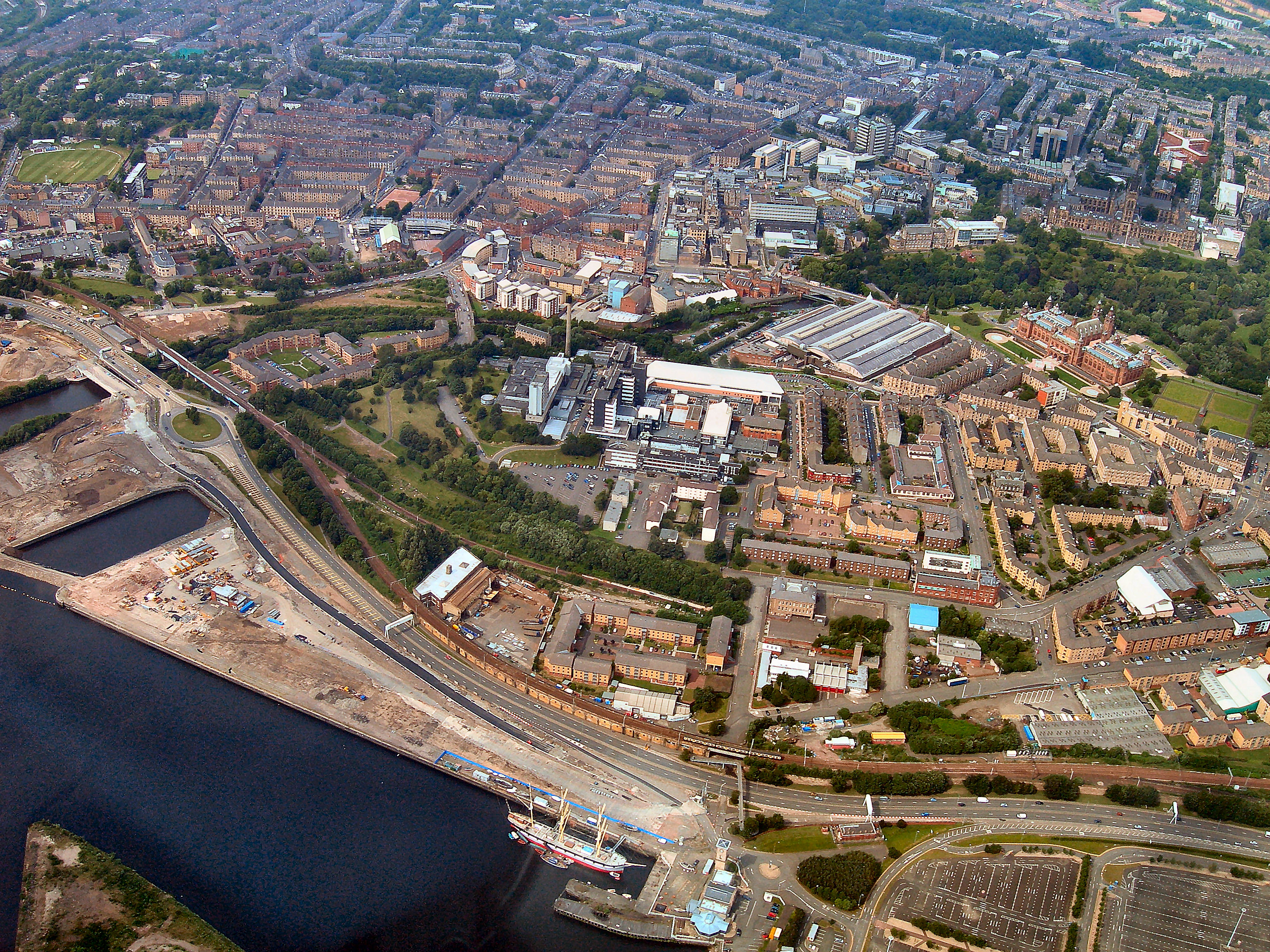
- Aerial view of the Yorkhill area from the south (2010)

- Location within Glasgow
- OS grid reference: NS563666
- Council area: Glasgow City Council
- Lieutenancy area: Glasgow
- Country: Scotland
- Sovereign state: United Kingdom
- Post town: GLASGOW
- Postcode district: G3
- Dialling code: 0141
- Police: Scotland
- Fire: Scottish
- Ambulance: Scottish
- UK Parliament: Glasgow North
- Scottish Parliament: Glasgow Kelvin

Yorkhill (Scottish Gaelic: Cnoc Eabhraig) is an area in the city of Glasgow, Scotland. It is situated north of the River Clyde in the West End of the city. It is known for its famous hospitals and remains the location of the West Glasgow Ambulatory Care Hospital.

The Kelvin Hall is located in Yorkhill, and the Glasgow Museum of Transport was located in the building from 1987 to 2010 (now relocated to the nearby Riverside Museum in Partick). The area is mostly residential, with the majority of the housing stock consisting of sandstone tenement housing built in the early 20th century by the Overnewton Building Company.

The area boundaries are the River Kelvin to the west (Partick is on the other bank), the River Clyde to the south (opposite Govan) and the grounds of Kelvingrove Art Gallery and Museum to the north; the eastern boundary is not officially defined due to forming part of a continuous area of fairly dense urban development, with the historic neighbourhood of Kelvinhaugh lying between Yorkhill and Finnieston towards Glasgow city centre.

== History ==
The ancient name of the lands was Over Newton. It is thought that a small Roman station existed on Yorkhill. In 1868, while workmen were trenching ground on the summit of the hill, where faint indications of earthworks had long existed, they found Roman remains. These included several copper-alloy Roman coins (one of which was of Trajan), bronze finger-rings and fragments of Samian pottery. This discovery was interesting because few Roman artefacts had been found in central Glasgow.

In the early 19th century, the lands of Over Newton belonged to George Bogle and Robert Barclay. The westernmost section of Over Newton became the property of Robert Fulton Alexander, a merchant who, in 1805, erected a mansion on the hill. In 1813 the mansion and grounds were sold to Andrew Gilbert, another merchant, who purchased other adjoining lands and included these and the mansion under the general title of Yorkhill. The whole Yorkhill estate was left by him to his niece, Jane Gilbert, when he died in 1838. She had married the painter John Graham in 1834 and when Mrs Graham inherited her uncle’s estate, her husband assumed the surname Graham-Gilbert. In later years he worked from a studio in Yorkhill House and on his death his collection was left to the City of Glasgow.

In 1868, Yorkhill Quay was built on the river and the Yorkhill Basin added in 1907. In 1877, a substantial bridge was built over the River Kelvin, connecting Yorkhill to Partick (then a separate burgh).

In 1907, Daniel McCulloch Crerar-Gilbert of Yorkhill sold the estate to Glasgow's Royal Hospital for Sick Children. Yorkhill House was demolished to make way for the building of their new hospital, which was opened in July 1914 by George V. In 1940, all the patients at the RHSC were evacuated after the cruiser HMS Sussex, berthed at Yorkhill basin, was hit by German bombers.

In 1966, the Queen Mother's Maternity Hospital opened on the Yorkhill site adjacent to the RHSC. In 1966, the RHSC was relocated to Oakbank Hospital and the original hospital was demolished to make way for a new hospital. It was reopened by Elizabeth II in 1972.

== Notable people ==
- A. J. Cronin, writer, lived at 29 Esmond Street.
