= Duke Street, Glasgow =

Street in Glasgow, Scotland

Duke Street
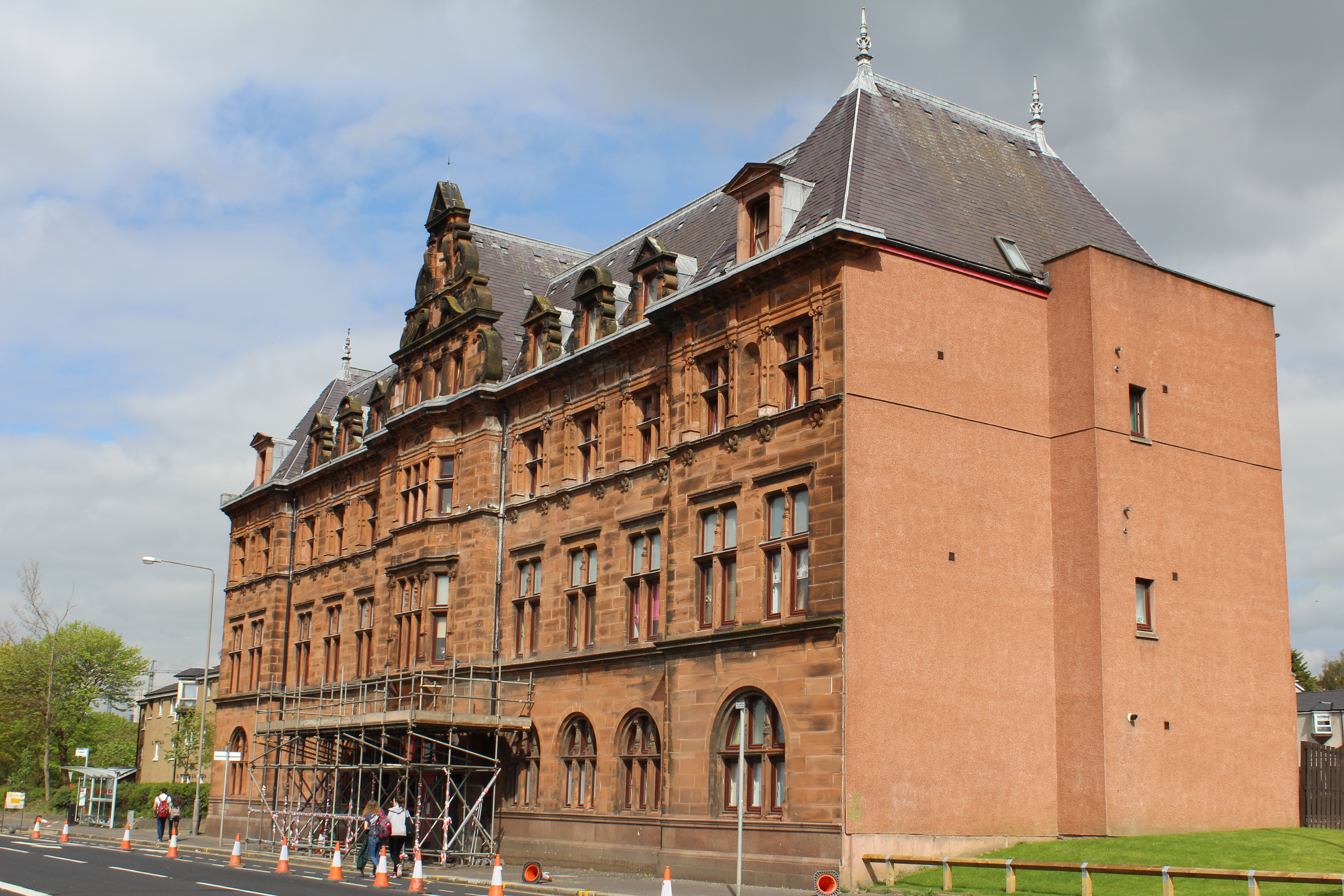
- Former Duke Street Hospital
- Interactive map of Duke Street
- Length: 2.0 mi (3.2 km)
- Coordinates: 55.85978°N 4.23513°W
- west end: A8
- east end: A89

Duke Street is a major street in Glasgow, Scotland, and is of the major road arteries connecting the City Centre to the East End. It begins at High Street and runs east through the residential districts of Ladywell and Dennistoun, and on towards Haghill and Parkhead, meeting the Gallowgate, Tollcross Road and Westmuir Street to form a turreted Edwardian junction at Parkhead Cross. It takes its name from the Duke of Montrose. At a total distance of two miles (three kilometres), Duke Street is the longest designated street in Britain.

== History ==
From 1460 to 1870, the original buildings of the University of Glasgow were located at the junction of High Street and Duke Street before it moved to the West End. The site was then turned into the College Goods yard by the City of Glasgow Union Railway before it was closed in 1968 in the wake of the Beeching Axe. The wall of the goods warehouse with its distinctive arched windows still faces onto this section of Duke Street, preserved as part of a new office block within the Collegelands development, which also includes a multi-storey car park, student accommodation and a hotel.

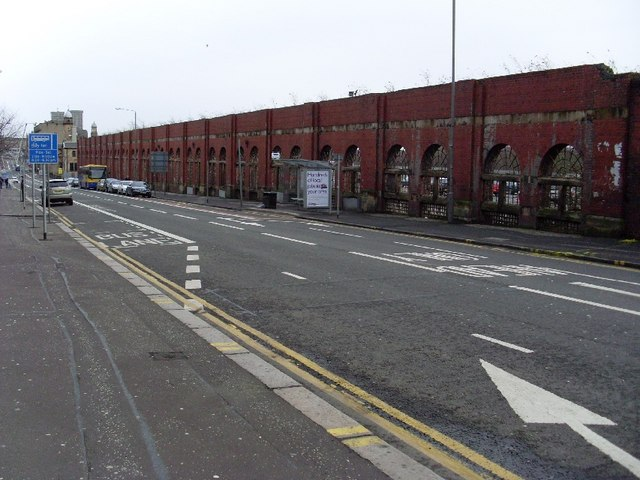
Boundary wall of High Street Goods Yard, 2008

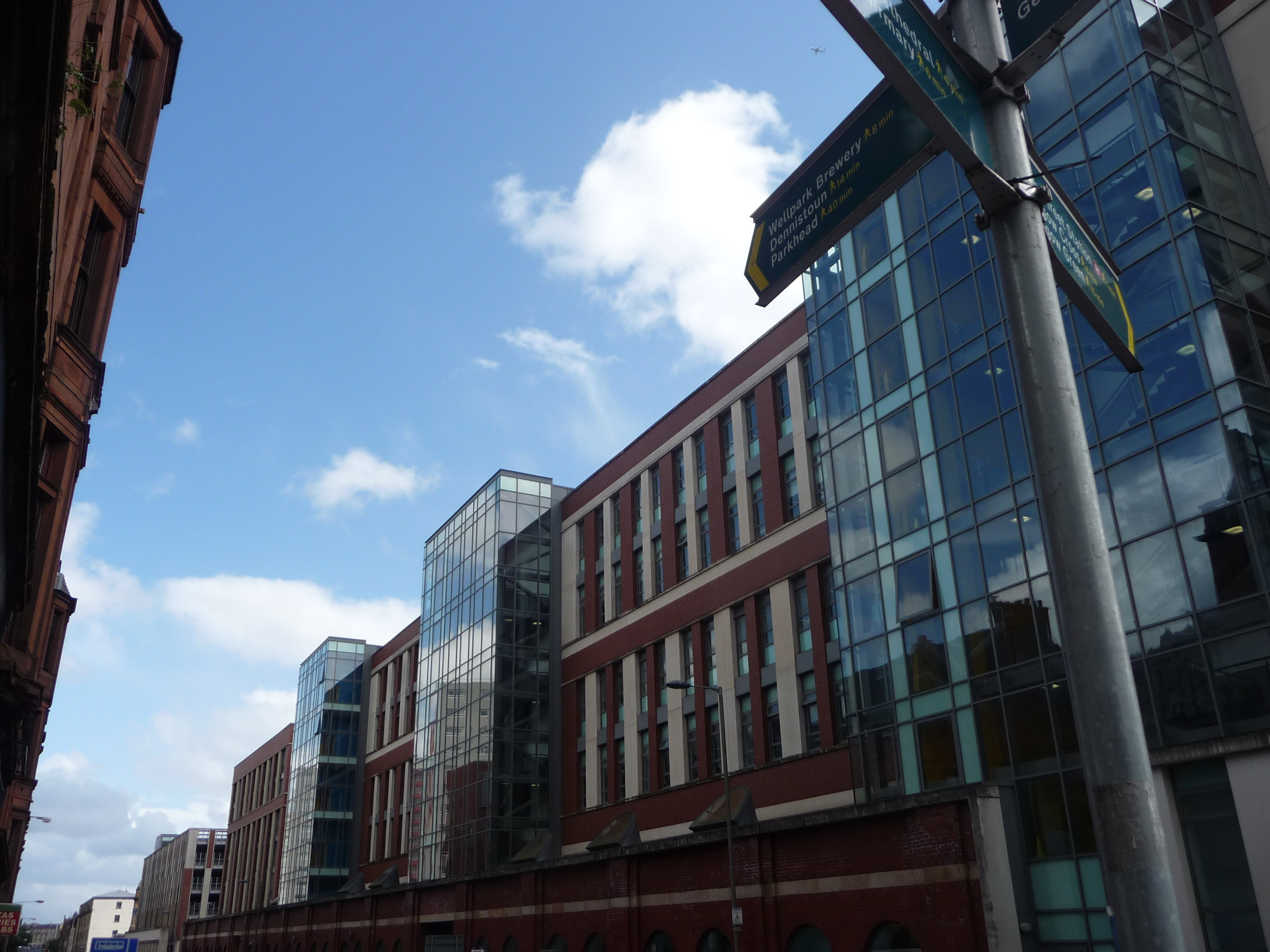
New office buildings incorporating the wall at same location above, 2018

Glasgow's infantry barracks was also built adjacent to the University, between Duke Street and the Gallowgate, in 1795. It could accommodate up to 1,000 men but, by the mid-19th century, the buildings were in a dire condition. In 1872, new barracks were completed in the suburb of Maryhill. The site was also used as part of the College goods yard site.

The new Glasgow Meat Market and Abattoir was opened at the corner of Duke Street and Bellgrove Street in Calton, in the 1970s after the original meat market in the nearby Gallowgate, which dated from 1879, closed. It operated for many years as a car auction. The new meat market closed in July 2001 and was demolished in 2007, with new residential developments being constructed on the site. The old market's two listed Victorian entrance archways were retained.

From 1798 to 1957, Duke Street was best known for being the location of Duke Street Prison before it was demolished in 1958, making way for the Drygate (Ladywell) housing estate built on the site from 1961 to 1964. The only remaining structure of Duke Street Prison is some of the boundary wall.

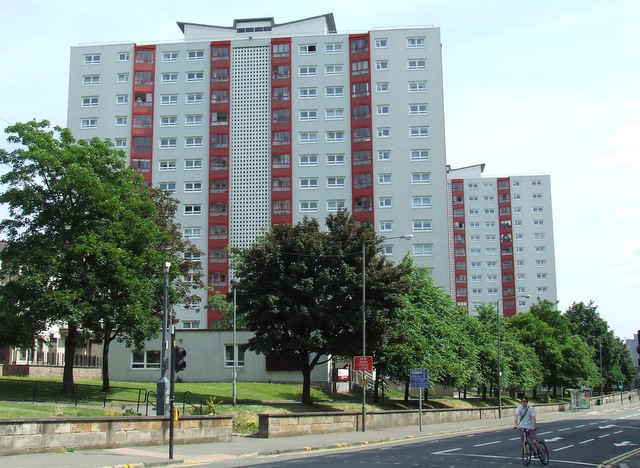
The Drygate high-rise estate, built in 1962 in the Ladywell area

== Landmarks ==
Today, landmarks on Duke Street include the A-listed Ladywell Business Centre, originally designed by John Burnet in 1858 as the Alexanders Endowed School, Tennents' Wellpark Brewery and the nearby Glasgow Necropolis.

The A-listed former Sydney Place United Presbyterian Church at 176 Duke Street, was built 1867/8 by Charles Kinnear and John Dick Peddie in a neoclassical Greek revival style. The church was damaged in a fire but was restored by the Glasgow Building Preservation Trust in 1996 as an extension to the Wellpark Enterprise Centre.

There is also a large British Bakeries factory. There was also the Eastern District Hospital, latterly known as Duke Street Hospital, before it closed 1994. The main building was converted into flats, but is now vacant. The area is served by High Street railway station, Bellgrove railway station and Duke Street railway station.

=== Great Eastern Hotel ===
The building at 100 Duke St is a fireproof six-storeyed (plus basement) mill built in 1848 for R. F. and J. Alexander, cotton-spinners. The lower three floors have brick vaults on a cast-iron frame; the top three floors are of mass concrete vaults on corrugated iron arches, a very early example of such a construction.

The mill closed in the early 20th century and in 1908 it was converted into a model lodging house for men, named the 'Great Eastern Hotel'. It even boasted a 200-foot (60-metre) roller-skating rink on the top floor. It soon became a refuge for homeless people. The rooms were split into small cubicles with half-height partitions and in total housed over 300, perhaps as many as 500, men in squalid conditions.

In the mid-1990s the building was acquired by Milnbank Housing Association and plans were developed to turn the building into flats. It took until 2001 to rehouse all the men and for the hostel to be closed; the building then lay derelict for many years. During this time the roof blew off in a gale in January 2008 and the eastern gable plus 3 bays collapsed in March 2009. Milnbank in partnership with construction firm CCG started work in 2009 to convert the building into 60 flats for private sale, a further 48 for social rent in an adjacent new build, and a new nursery for 75 children. This included the rebuilding of the eastern wing's stone work and windows to the original detailing. The original stained glass windows to the ground floor were reproduced, and car parking was incorporated within the basement level. Funding was a combination of Housing Association Grant (HAG) under the Scottish Government’s Affordable Housing Investment Programme (AHIP), Big Lottery Fund and private funding from the developer's own resources.

== See also ==
- Glasgow tower blocks
