= NHS Greater Glasgow and Clyde =

NHS board based in Glasgow, Scotland

- Type: NHS board
- Established: 2006
- Headquarters: 1055 Great Western Road; Glasgow; G12 0XH
- Region served: Glasgow City; East Dunbartonshire; East Renfrewshire; Inverclyde; Renfrewshire; West Dunbartonshire; North Lanarkshire (part); South Lanarkshire (part)
- Population: 1,196,335
- Hospitals: List of hospitals
- Staff: 38,000
- Website: www.nhsggc.org.uk

NHS Greater Glasgow and Clyde is an NHS board in West Central Scotland, created from the amalgamation of NHS Greater Glasgow and part of NHS Argyll and Clyde on 1 April 2006.

It is the largest health board in both Scotland, and the UK, which consists of the council areas of Glasgow City, East Dunbartonshire, East Renfrewshire, Inverclyde, Renfrewshire and West Dunbartonshire.

== Health services ==
The board is responsible for:

- 35 hospitals
- 240 GP practices (in total around 790 GPs)
- 300 Community Pharmacies
- 270 Dental practices
- 180 Ophthalmic practices

== Community Health Partnerships ==
Glasgow City Community Health Partnership was formed in April 2010, bringing together the five Community Health and Social Care Partnerships that had covered East Glasgow, North Glasgow, South East Glasgow, South West Glasgow and West Glasgow.

== Hospitals ==
- List of hospitals in Scotland (NHS Greater Glasgow and Clyde section)

The board is pioneering the mental health arm of the Scottish Patient Safety Programme.

Since February 2014, 36 staff have left the board with settlement deals including confidentiality clauses worth a total of £754,382.

The board operates two large cook freeze production units, where food is prepared, cooked and frozen. They provide 7,652 meals a day – a demand which increased during the COVID-19 pandemic in Scotland. They use Medstor equipment for distribution.
