= March 1924 =

Month of 1924

<<	March 1924					>>
Su	Mo	Tu	We	Th	Fr	Sa
						1
2	3	4	5	6	7	8
9	10	11	12	13	14	15
16	17	18	19	20	21	22
23	24	25	26	27	28	29
30	31

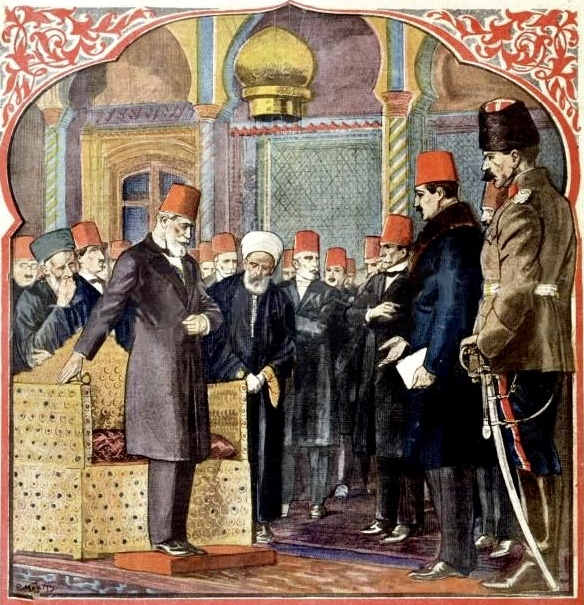
March 3, 1924: Turkey abolishes a remnant of the former Ottoman monarchy, the caliphate, a claim of succession to the Islamic State of Muhammad

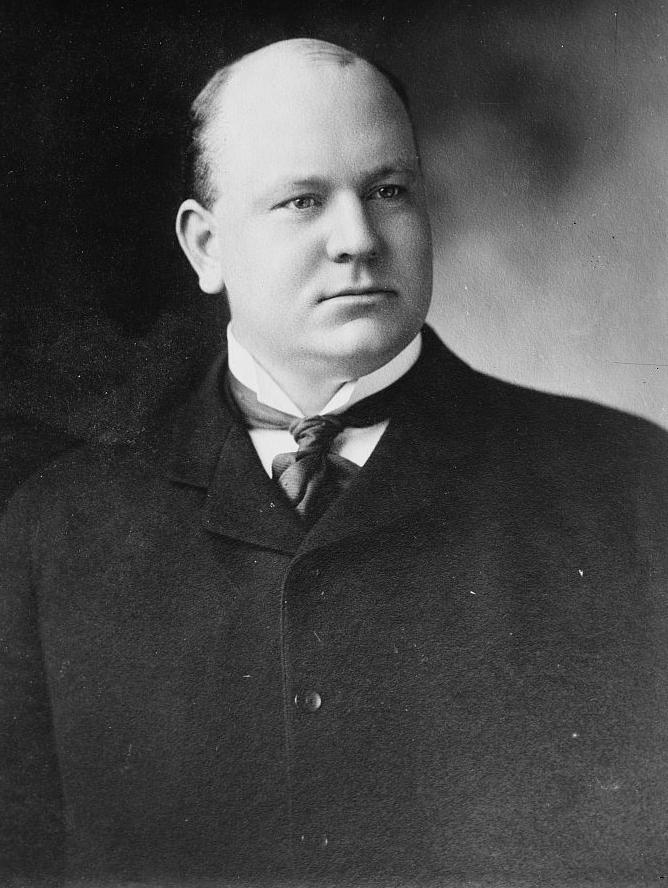
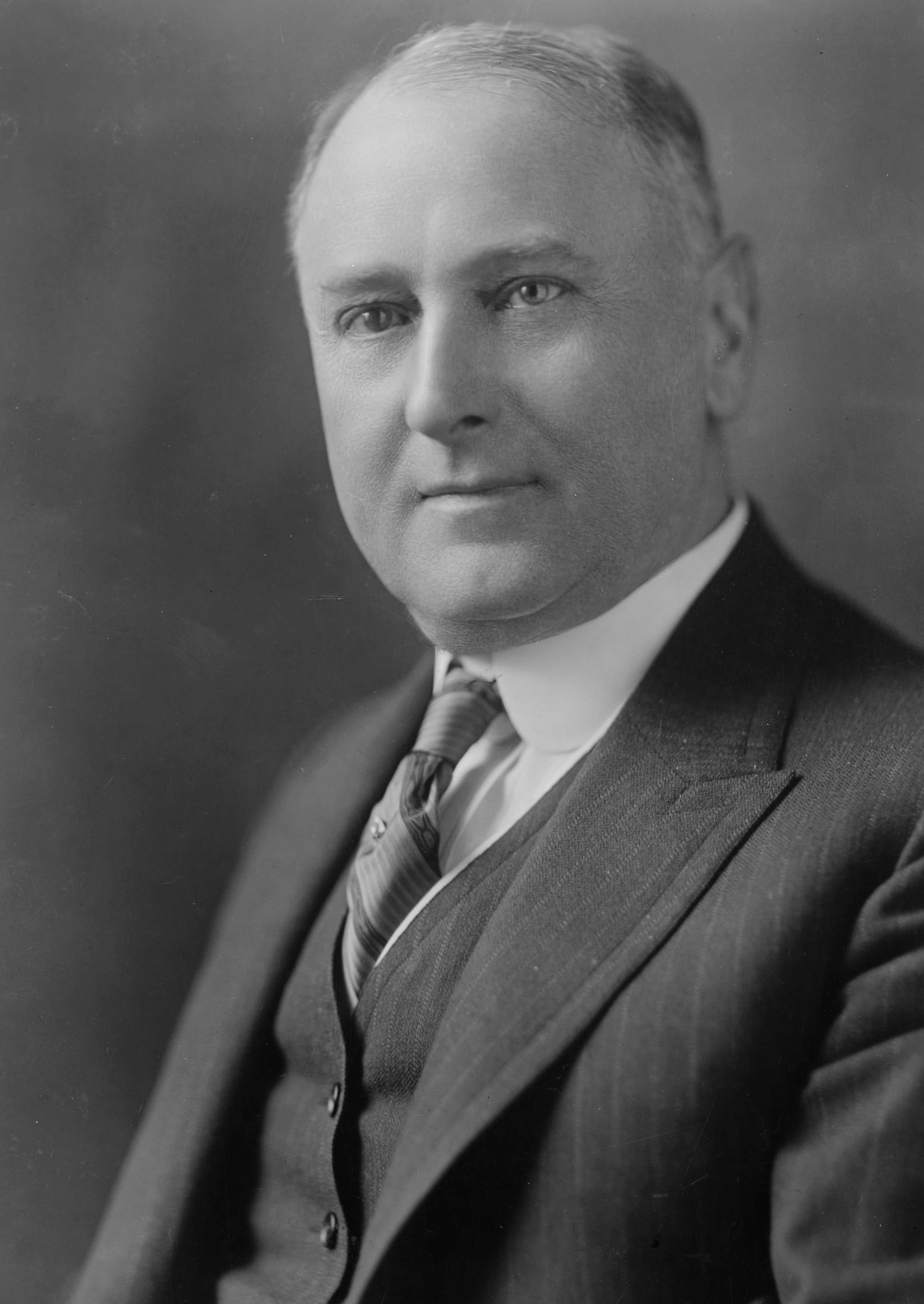
March 10 and 28, 1924: War Secretary Denby and Attorney General Daugherty forced to resign in U.S. Teapot Dome scandal
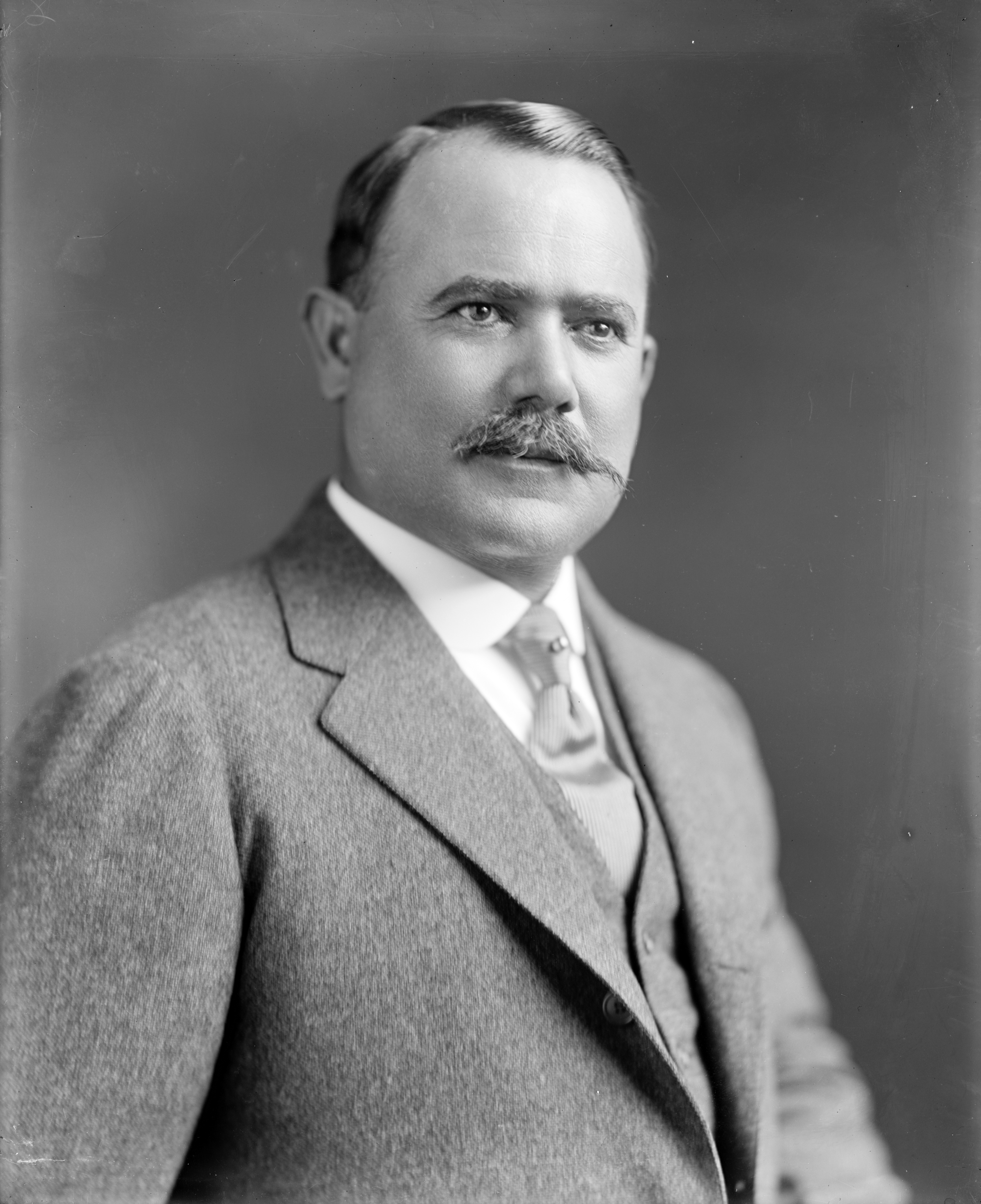
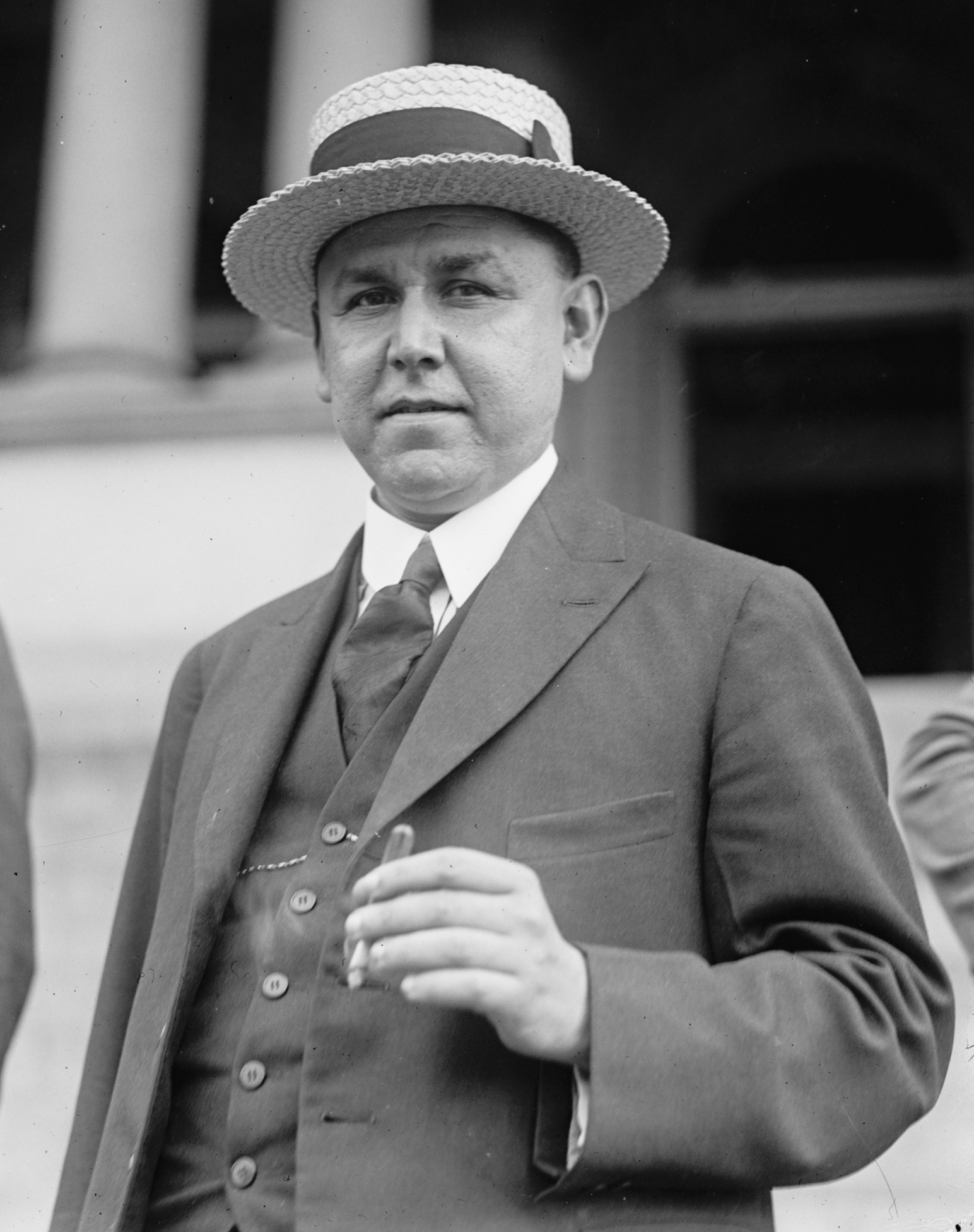
March 7, 1924: Mexico's President Obregón defeats de la Huerta rebellion

The following events occurred in March 1924:

== March 1, 1924 (Saturday) ==
- The Nixon Nitration Works disaster, an explosion of ammonium nitrate, killed at least 18 people, destroyed several miles of New Jersey factories, and demolished the "tiny industrial town of Nixon, New Jersey."
- Public vehicles such as taxicabs were allowed into London's Hyde Park for the first time since 1636, after the House of Commons had repealed the ban on motion by M.P. Ben Smith. The 1636 law had made Hyde Park "reserved for people who kept their own carriages." Smith himself had been a taxicab driver prior to becoming an official in the Transport and General Workers' Union.
- The Communist Party of Germany was legally reinstated. It had been banned in November 1923 after it tried to launch a general strike.
- Alice's Day at Sea, the first of 57 films in Walt Disney's Alice Comedies series, was introduced to American cinemas as a short (11-minute) movie to be shown prior to a feature film. The silent film featured 5-year-old Virginia Davis in a combination of live action and animation. An earlier Alice comedy, Alice's Wonderland, had been shown to theater owners but never released to the public.
- Born: Deke Slayton, American astronaut who was one of the original Mercury 7 and who later served on the Apollo–Soyuz mission in 1975; as Donald Kent Slayton, in Sparta, Wisconsin, United States (d. 1993)
- Died:
  - Billy Armstrong, 33, British-born American comedian and silent film actor, known for starring in 1919's Hop, the Bellhop with Oliver Hardy; died from tuberculosis (b. 1891)
  - Gopinath Saha, 18, Bengali activist for independence in British India; hanged at the Alipore Central Jail in Calcutta for the murder of a bystander during his attempt to assassinate Calcutta Police Commissioner Charles Tegart (b. 1905)

== March 2, 1924 (Sunday) ==
- Cardinal Désiré-Joseph Mercier of Belgium issued a pastoral letter calling on Belgians to help their government restore the country's finances.
- Born:
  - Michael Sela, Israeli immunologist at the Weizmann Institute of Science, co-developer of the drug copaxone used as a treatment for multiple sclerosis; as Mieczysław Salomonowicz, in Tomaszów, Poland (d. 2022)
  - June Norma Olley, English-born Australian microbiologist; in Croydon, London, England (d. 2019)
  - Marty Baum, American talent agent; as Marin Baum, in New York City, United States (d. 2010)

== March 3, 1924 (Monday) ==
- Shefqet Vërlaci became the new Prime Minister of Albania after Ahmet Zogu's serious injury in the assassination attempt of February 23.
- The Turkish National Assembly formally ended the Ottoman Caliphate, a remnant of the Ottoman monarchy, voting "almost unanimously" to abolish the office, and ordered that Abdulmejid II and his harem were to be deported by March 15. Abdulmejid, first cousin of the last Ottoman sultan Mehmed VI, who had become caliph on November 19, 1922 was formally deposed at 2:00 the next morning.
- Seán O'Casey's drama Juno and the Paycock opened at the Abbey Theatre, Dublin.
- Born:
  - Tomiichi Murayama, Japanese politician, served as the Prime Minister of Japan from 1994 to 1996; in Ōita, Empire of Japan (present-day Japan) (d. 2025)
  - Johnson Aguiyi-Ironsi, Nigerian military officer who served as the first military dictator and head of state of Nigeria; in Umuahia, British Nigeria (present-day Nigeria) (d. 1966, assassinated)
  - Lys Assia, Swiss singer and first winner of the Eurovision Song Contest; as Rosa Mina Schärer, in Aargau, Switzerland (d. 2018)
  - Lilian Velez, Philippine film actress; in Cebu City, Philippine Islands (present-day Philippines) (d. 1948, murdered)
  - John Woodnutt, British actor; in London, England) (d. 2006)
  - Hadi Rohani, Iranian ayatollah of the Shi'ite Muslim faith; in Kalehbast, Sublime State of Iran (present-day Hadishahr, Iran) (d. 1999)
- Died: Pell Trenton, 40, American film actor, star of The Blue Moon and other silent movies; died of pulmonary tuberculosis (b. 1883)

== March 4, 1924 (Tuesday) ==
- A 7.1 magnitude earthquake, with an epicenter at Orotina in Costa Rica, struck at 5:23 in the morning local time and killed 70 people. Damage was caused in the capital at San Jose, 40 miles (64 km) away.
- Aidan de Brune became the first person to walk all the way around Australia, returning to Sydney from whence he had departed on September 20, 1921.
- The University of North Carolina Tar Heels men's basketball team completed a perfect season of 26 wins and no losses, as one of the major unbeaten team in the nation, by winning the 16-team Southern Intercollegiate Conference postseason tournament, defeating the Alabama Crimson Tide, 26 to 18, in Atlanta. The University of Texas Longhorns also went unbeaten, finishing the Southwest Conference regular season with a 23-0 record and being 20-0 in SWC games, but did not play against North Carolina.
- Born:
  - Kenneth O'Donnell, American political consultant, aide to U.S. President John F. Kennedy; in Worcester, Massachusetts, United States (d. 1977)
  - Donald R. Yennie, American theoretical physicist known for devising the Yennie gauge mathematical procedure; in Paterson, New Jersey, United States (d. 1993)

== March 5, 1924 (Wednesday) ==
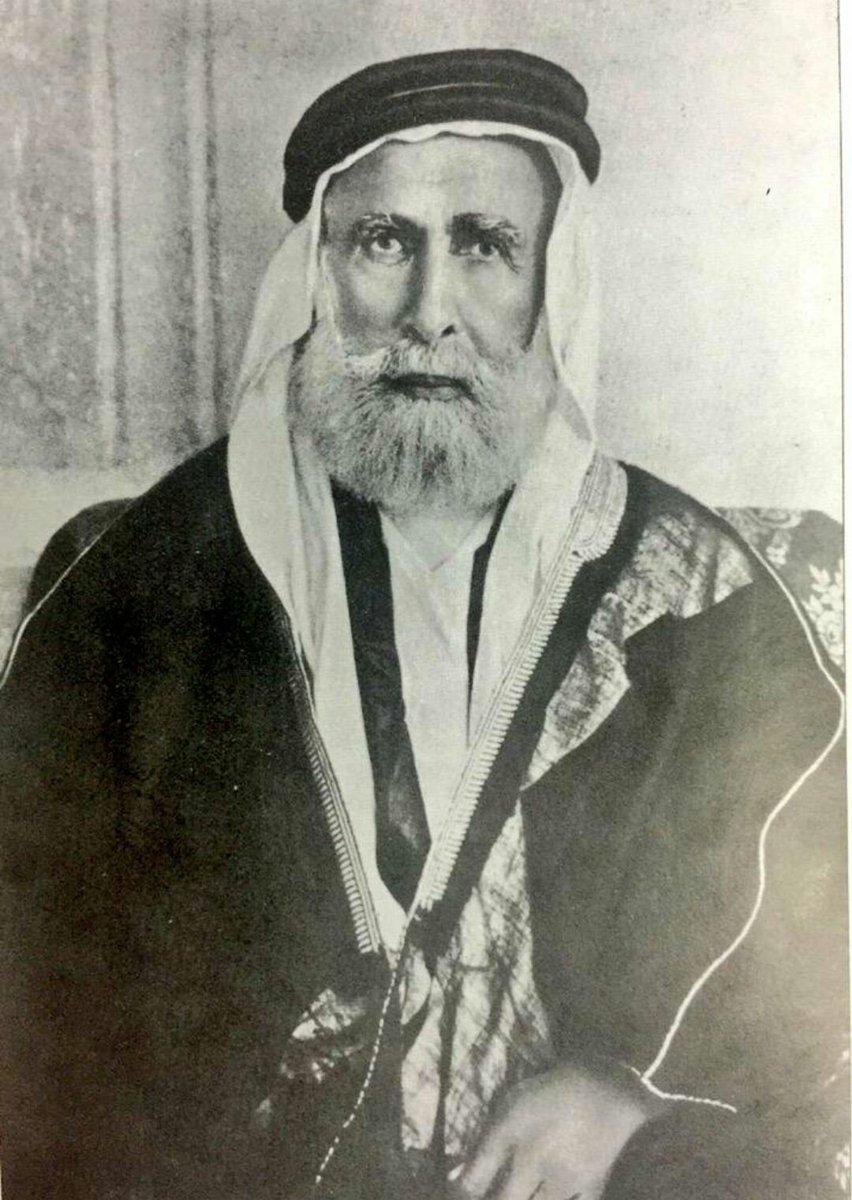
Hussein, the would-be Caliph

- Just two days after Turkey abolished the caliphate, Hussein bin Ali, King of the Hejaz (now Saudi Arabia) and Sharif of Mecca, was proclaimed the Caliph of all Muslims by Muslim leaders in Mesopotamia (now Iraq) and Transjordania (now Jordan). The response throughout the Muslim world was mostly negative.
- Born: Harvey Bernhard, American film producer, known for horror films The Omen (1976) and The Lost Boys (1987); in Seattle, United States (d. 2014)
- Died: Viktor von Tschusi zu Schmidhoffen, 76, Austrian ornithologist (b. 1847). Among the birds named in his honor are the European goldfinch Carduelis tschusii common reed bunting Emberiza schoeniclus tschusii and the Eurasian wryneck Jynx torquilla tschusii.

== March 6, 1924 (Thursday) ==
- In an elaborate nighttime ceremony at Luxor under floodlights, Egypt's Prime Minister Saad Zaghloul formally opened the site of Tutankamun's tomb to the Egyptian public, which reportedly attracted the largest crowd seen in Luxor. The reopening turned into an anti-British demonstration when the British High Commissioner, Field Marshal Allenby, arrived when the crowd was demanding immediate British withdrawal from Egypt.
- Turkey's second government was organized as Prime Minister Ismet Pasha formed a new council of ministers at the request of President Mustapha Kemal Pasha. Ismet replaced four members of his Cabinet and eliminated the Ministry of Sharia and Foundations, and the Ministry of the General Staff while splitting the Ministry of the Economy into the new Ministry of Commerce and Ministry of Agriculture.
- Born:
  - William H. Webster, American federal judge, served as the Director of the FBI from 1978 to 1987 and Director of the CIA from 1987 to 1991; in St. Louis (d. 2025)
  - Obi James Anyasi II, African tribal monarch who ruled the Esan people of Idumuje-Unor in southeast Nigeria from 1946 to 2013 (d. 2013)

== March 7, 1924 (Friday) ==
- The Delahueristas, rebel supporters of former Mexican President Adolfo de la Huerta, surrendered across Mexico as President Álvaro Obregón offered an amnesty, bringing an end to the De la Huerta rebellion after three months.
- A representative of the Irish Republican Army Organisation (IRAO) handed an ultimatum to Ireland's President W. T. Cosgrave, from Major-General Liam Tobin and Colonel Charles Dalton, demanding an end to Defence Minister Richard Mulcahy's demobilization of Irish Army troops. Mulcahy ordered the arrest of both officers on charges of mutiny.
- Born: Kōbō Abe, Japanese novelist; in Kita, Tokyo, Empire of Japan (present-day Japan) (d. 1993)
- Died: Pat Moran, 48, American professional baseball player and manager; died of kidney disease (b. 1876)

== March 8, 1924 (Saturday) ==
- All 171 miners were killed in two explosions at the Castle Gate mine at Castle Gate, Utah, near the town of Helper.
- The Governor-General of British India, Lord Reading transferred full power of administration of the princely state of Bahawalpur (now part of the Punjab province of Pakistan) to the 19-year-old Nawab of Bahawalpur, Sadeq Mohammad Khan V who had been the nominal ruler since ascending the throne at the age of two on February 15, 1907.
- Inventor Nikola Tesla spoke out for the first time in years, announcing he had perfected a system of transmitting power without wires.
- Georgios Kafantaris was forced by the Greek Army to resign as Prime Minister of Greece, along with his cabinet, less than a month after succeeding Eleftherios Venizelos, after refusing to endorse the Army's call for the abolition of the monarchy in favor of a republic. Kafantaris had proposed a referendum on the future of the monarchy while the Army requested an immediate change.
- The Kingdom of Greece established diplomatic relations with the Soviet Union, a policy that continued even after the kingdom was abolished less than one month later.
- Born:
  - Walter Chiari, Italian stage and film actor; as Walter Annicchiarico, in Verona, Kingdom of Italy (present-day Italy) (d. 1991)
  - Louie Nunn, American politician, 52nd governor of Kentucky; in Park, Kentucky, United States (d. 2004)
  - Sean McClory, Irish actor; in Dublin, Irish Free State (present-day Ireland) (d. 2003)
- Died: Alfred Holland Smith, 60, President of the New York Central Railroad; killed after he fell from a horse while riding through New York City's Central Park (b. 1863)

== March 9, 1924 (Sunday) ==
- The French Cabinet held an emergency meeting to consider extraordinary measures to stabilize the collapsing franc, which dropped to 117.60 francs against the British pound sterling.
- Died: General Panagiotis Danglis, 70, Greek Army leader and Minister for Military Affairs during World War I, co-inventor of the Schneider-Danglis mountain gun (b. 1853)

== March 10, 1924 (Monday) ==
- U.S. Secretary of the Navy Edwin Denby resigned over the Teapot Dome scandal. He said that by quitting before he could be asked to resign, he was "dying with my face toward the enemy."
- France obtained a $50 million credit from American banks and a £5 million credit from London to stabilize the franc.
- In the case of Radice v. New York, the U.S. Supreme Court upheld a New York state statute banning late-night working for women on grounds of health.
- Born:
  - Angela Morley, British composer and conductor who won three Emmy Awards after her gender transition in 1972; as Walter Stott, in Leeds, Yorkshire, England (d. 2009)
  - Horace Busby, American speechwriter and political consultant, presidential adviser and speechwriter for U.S. president Lyndon B. Johnson; in Fort Worth, Texas, United States (d. 2000)
- Died: Rafael López Gutiérrez, 68, President of Honduras from 1920 until his death (b. 1854)

== March 11, 1924 (Tuesday) ==
- The worst Atlantic gale in twenty years hit the east coast of the United States, downing telephone and telegraph lines and killing nine people.
- Belva Gaertner, a cabaret singer, was arrested for the murder of her abusive lover, Walter Law, who was found dead from a bullet wound in her car in Chicago. She would be acquitted based on reasonable doubt over whether Law's death was a murder or a suicide. The story would be the inspiration of the Maurine Dallas Watkins Broadway play, Chicago in 1926, and for the successful John Kander and Fred Ebb musical Chicago in 1975.
- Born:
  - Franco Basaglia, Italian psychiatrist and reformer in mental health care, founder of Psichiatria Democratica; in San Polo, Venice, Kingdom of Italy (present-day Italy) (d. 1980)
  - Bill Ezinicki, Canadian professional ice hockey forward who played in the NHL 1944 to 1955; in Winnipeg, Manitoba, Canada (d. 2012)
  - Eva Von Gencsy, Hungarian-born Canadian jazz dancer and choreographer, creator of Les Ballets Jazz de Montréal; in Csongrád, Kingdom of Hungary (present-day Hungary) (d. 2013)
- Died:
  - Chichester Bell, 75-76, Irish audio engineer and inventor, developed the Graphophone recorded music player (b. 1848)
  - Helene von Mülinen, 73, Swiss feminist and founder of the Bund Schweizerischer Frauenvereine, the first women's suffrage organization in Switzerland (b. 1850)

== March 12, 1924 (Wednesday) ==
- Adolfo de la Huerta, leader of the failed Mexican rebellion against President Álvaro Obregón, went into exile to Florida.
- Commonwealth Oil Refineries, a joint venture of the Australian government and the Anglo-Persian Oil Company and the first oil refinery in Australia, began its refining operations as it received its first shipment of crude oil at Laverton, Victoria, north of Melbourne.
- The World Court of the League of Nations issued its decision to end the border dispute between Poland and Czechoslovakia within the Orava Territory in a reworking of the original Spa Conference of 1920 decision. Czechoslovakia was allowed to retain Javorina (formerly Javorzyna) and Ždiar in return for ceding Nižná Lipnica (now Lipnica Wielka, Nowy Targ County) to Poland, while Polish territory around Sucha Góra and Glodōvka became Suchá Hora and Hladovka in what is now Slovakia.
- Born:
  - Mary Lee Woods, British computer scientist; in Hall Green, Birmingham, England (d. 2017)
  - Utpala Sen, Indian Bengali singer; in Dacca, Bengal province, British India (present-day Dhaka, Bangladesh) (d. 2005)
  - Roy Haynes, British automobile designer who oversaw the creation of the Ford Cortina Mk II and the Ford Zephyr Zodiac Mk4 (d. 2020)

== March 13, 1924 (Thursday) ==
- German Chancellor Wilhelm Marx dissolved the Reichstag ahead of a general election to be held on May 4.
- Born:
  - Meinhard Michael Moser, Austrian mycologist studying Agaricales fungi, author of Die Blätter und Bauchpilze (Agaricales und Gastromycetes) which cataloged 3,150 species and was published in 1953; in Innsbruck, Austria (d. 2002)
  - Arthur Holch, American TV documentary filmmaker; in Omaha, Nebraska, United States (d. 2010)
  - James Orthwein, American advertising executive, one-time owner of the New England Patriots of the NFL; in St. Louis, United States (d. 2008)
- Died:
  - Samri Baldwin, 76, American magician and debunker of fraudulent mentalists (b. 1848)
  - Helene Marie Stromeyer, 89, German floral and landscape painter (b. 1834)

== March 14, 1924 (Friday) ==
- A League of Nations committee spearheaded by American diplomat Norman Davis reached a settlement on the question of the administration of the Klaipėda Region (Memelland in German), leading to the signing of the Klaipėda Convention two months later.
- Fighting broke out in Honduras in the wake of the death of President Rafael López Gutiérrez, initiated by rebels who opposed the new President, Francisco Bueso.
- Died:
  - Nellie Kershaw, 32-33, English textile worker, first known person to die of asbestosis (b. c.1891). Miss Kershaw worked for Turner Brothers Asbestos for 18 years, starting at age 13 and continuing until 1922.
  - Cyril Harcourt, 51, British playwright and novelist whose 1914 Broadway play A Pair of Silk Stockings was later adapted to the 1932 film comedy They Just Had to Get Married (b. 1872)

== March 15, 1924 (Saturday) ==
- Voting was held in the Dominican Republic for the next president and for the bicameral Congress. Horacio Vásquez defeated Jacinto Peynado by more than 2 to 1 margin, and his Progressive National Alliance party won 24 of the 31 seats in the Chamber of Deputies and 10 of the 12 seats in the Dominican Senate.
- Egypt's King Fuad I opened the initial session of the first-ever Egyptian constitutional parliament.
- King Victor Emmanuel III of Italy gave the warrior-poet Gabriele D'Annunzio the title of Prince of Montenevoso.
- England beat Scotland, 19 to 0, to clinch a perfect 4–0 record in the Five Nations Championship rugby tournament and complete a Grand Slam.
- Kenya held a legislative election, the first under its new Constitution.
- Born:
  - Walter Gotell, German actor; as Walter Goettel, in Bonn, Germany (d. 1997)
  - Concordia Scott, Scottish nun and sculptor; as Caroline Scott, in Glasgow, Scotland (d. 2014)
- Died:
  - Louis Atilla, 79, German strongman and personal trainer to members of royalty and high society (b. 1844)
  - Brigadier General Richard Henry Pratt, 83, American US Army officer and founder of the Carlisle Indian School, known for his policy of forcibly assimilating Native Americans into Anglo-Saxon culture (b. 1840). General Pratt is credited with coining the word racism in 1902, but also known his summary of erasing the native culture with the phrase "Kill the Indian, save the man."
  - Major General DeRosey Cabell, 62, chief of staff for General John J. Pershing of the Pancho Villa Expedition from 1916 to 1917 after Villa's attack on Columbus, New Mexico (b. 1861)

== March 16, 1924 (Sunday) ==
- Italy formally annexed Fiume in a colorful ceremony. Crowds cheered as King Victor Emmanuel III read the annexation decree.
- Born:
  - Otto Hittmair, Austrian theoretical physicist who worked with Erwin Schrödinger on trying to find a unified field theory; in Innsbruck (killed in mountain climbing accident, 2003)
  - Liu Ling Tong (stage name for Zhang Zongyi), Chinese opera actor for the Zhejiang Shao Opera Theatre; in Shaoxing, Zhejiang province (d. 2014)
  - Wolfgang Kieling, German film actor known for his brief move from West Germany to Communist East Germany from 1968 to 1971; in Berlin (d. 1985)
- Died:
  - Robert Lincoln Poston, 33, African-American newspaper editor and journalist, died of lobar pneumonia
  - Annie Matheson, 70, British writer known for Florence Nightingale: A biography and for her "Rose and Dragon" children's book series.

== March 17, 1924 (Monday) ==
- Eligio Ayala resigned as President of Paraguay 13 months after he had been appointed by the Paraguayan Congress on April 12, 1923. He was replaced by Luis Alberto Riart, who was selected by the Congress.

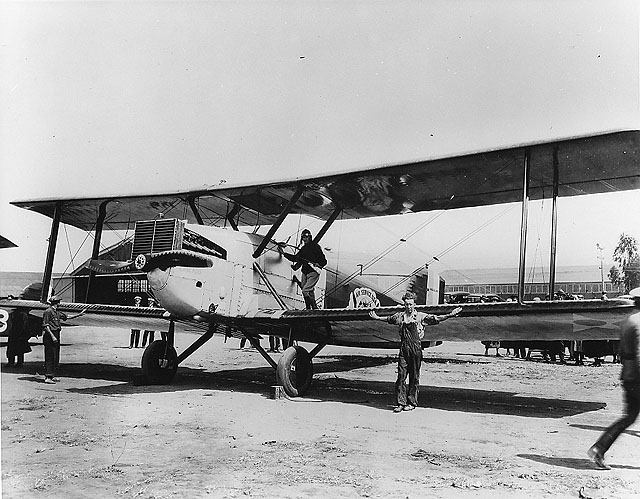
Chicago on its round-the-world journey

- The first attempt to fly around the world began as four Douglas World Cruiser airplanes, piloted by members of the United States Army Air Service, departed from Santa Monica, California, for Seattle, the starting point of the global circumnavigation.
- Athlone Town defeated Fordsons 1-0 to win the Football Association of Ireland Cup.
- France defeated Sweden 2-1 to win the Ice Hockey European Championship.

== March 18, 1924 (Tuesday) ==
- The Irish Army Mutiny came to a crisis as 40 armed soldiers assembled at a hotel in Dublin to plan the next move, including a possible coup d'etat against the Irish government. Two truckloads of Irish Army troops surrounded the building and a standoff ensued. The Irish government responded by getting the resignation of the Irish Army Council members, along with that of Defence Minister Richard Mulcahy.
- The swashbuckling film The Thief of Bagdad, starring Douglas Fairbanks, was released.
- Born: Johnny Papalia, crime boss in the Canadian mob; in Hamilton, Ontario (d.1997)

== March 19, 1924 (Wednesday) ==
- Winston Churchill of the Constitutionalists lost the Westminster Abbey by-election by 43 votes to Unionist candidate Otho Nicholson, who had 8,187 votes to Churchill's 8,144. Churchill had originally lost by 33 votes and requested a recount, which showed a larger winning majority.
- Bertolt Brecht's play The Life of Edward II of England (Leben Eduards des Zweiten von England) was given its first performance, premiering at the Munich Kammerspiele.
- Born:
  - F. C. Kohli (Faqir Chand Kohli), Indian software producer, information technology entrepreneur, and founder of Tata Consultancy Services, in Peshawar, Punjab Province, British India (now Punjab province in Pakistan (d. 2020)
  - Mary Wimbush, British film, television, radio and stage actress; in Kenton, Middlesex (now in Greater London) (d. 2005)
  - Keith Brueckner, American theoretical physicist; in Minneapolis (d. 2014)
  - Lev Kulidzhanov, Soviet Armenian film director; in Tiflis, Transcaucasian SFSR, Soviet Union (d. 2002)
- Died:
  - Nathan Clifford Ricker, 80, American professor and architect
  - Prince Kachō Hirotada of Japan, 22, died of encephalomyelitis that he had contracted while serving on the ship Isuzu.

== March 20, 1924 (Thursday) ==
- What is now the national airline of Finland, Finnair, began operations as Aero O/Y, with a flight from Helsinki to Tallinn in Estonia in a Junkers F.13 seaplane.
- The "Eugenical Sterilization Act" went into effect in the U.S. state of Virginia upon being signed into law by Governor E. Lee Trinkle, providing for the sterilization of persons in mental institutions.
- Nadir of American race relations: In the U.S., the Virginia General Assembly passed the Racial Integrity Act, amending the state's racial classification law which had provided that a person was considered to be "colored" if they had a great-grandparent who was African-American. The amendment enacted the "one-drop rule", which provided that a person was considered non-white if it was shown that they had any ancestor who was African-American. The 1924 Act had what was called the "Pocahontas Clause" providing that a person with an American Indian ancestor would be considered white if they were 15/16ths European.
- Born: James Barr, Scottish Biblical scholar; in Glasgow (d. 2006)
- Died:
  - Carl Hertz, 64, American magician known for creating the "vanishing bird cage" act
  - Sophia Goudstikker, 59, Dutch-born German women's rights activist and photographer

== March 21, 1924 (Friday) ==
- The first modern mutual fund, the Massachusetts Investors Trust, was introduced by Edward G. Leffler with an open-ended policy that allowed investors to withdraw their account money at any time from the collective investment.
- A British soldier was killed, and 21 others wounded, in a drive-by shooting at Queenstown in Ireland's County Cork. Four IRA members dressed as Irish Free State Army officers drove into town in a converted 1919 Rolls-Royce, dubbed the "Moon Car". As the Moon Car drove past the destroyer HMS Scythe at the port of Spike Island, the men opened fire with a machine gun.
- London drivers of trams and public buses went on strike.
- Boxer Abe Goldstein won the world bantamweight championship in a 15-round bout against Joe Lynch before 14,900 people at Madison Square Garden in New York City.
- Born: Harry Lehmann, German physicist; in Güstrow (d. 1998)
- Died: T. E. Dunville (stage name for Thomas Edward Wallen), 56, English comedian, committed suicide one day after his final stage performance. He left a suicide note for his wife, and his body was found in the River Thames the next day.

== March 22, 1924 (Saturday) ==
- The ocean liner RMS Olympic collided with the smaller liner Fort St George in New York City. The damage required repairs to the extent of which had never been attempted on a ship the size of Olympic before.
- Born:
  - Ivan Minatti, Slovenian poet; in Slovenske Konjice, Kingdom of Yugoslavia (d. 2012)
  - Yevgeny Ostashev, Soviet Russian test pilot of rocket and space complexes; in Maly Vasilyev, Russian SFSR, Soviet Union (d. 1960)
  - Alvin V. Tollestrup, U.S. physicist known for the development of the Tevatron particle accelerator at Fermilab; in Los Angeles (d. 2020)
- Died:
  - Louis Delluc, 33, French filmmaker, died of pneumonia after becoming ill during the filming of his final film, L'Inondation. The Prix Louis-Delluc for Best Film is named in his honor.
  - Siegmund Gabriel, 72, German chemist and discoverer of the Gabriel synthesis, the chemical reaction that transforms primary alkyl halides into primary amines, using potassium phthalimide
  - Walter Humphreys Sr., 74, English cricketer and umpire
  - Sir William Macewen, 75, pioneering Scottish surgeon who developed the Macewen's operation for an inguinal hernia; and discovered the Macewen's sign for diagnosing hydrocephalus.
  - General Robert Nivelle, 67, French Chief of the Army Staff, known for the Nivelle offensive on the Western Front during World War One.

== March 23, 1924 (Sunday) ==
- Benito Mussolini presided over a Fascist parade in Rome commemorating the fifth anniversary of the founding of the Fasci Italiani da Combattimento. Mussolini's commemorative speech doubled as a campaign speech for the upcoming general election as he listed his government's accomplishments.
- Born:
  - Kenneth N. Stevens, Canadian computer scientist and engineer, developer of acoustic phonetics; in Toronto (d. 2013)
  - Olga Kennard, Hungarian-born British scientist and researcher of crystallography for the structure of organic molecules; in Budapest (d. 2023)
  - Vasubahen Ramprasad Bhatt, Indian radio director, social activist and Gujarati language novelist; in Baroda, Baroda State (now Vadodara, Gujarat state) (d. 2020)

== March 24, 1924 (Monday) ==
- The U.S. House of Representatives voted to appropriate $10 million for the purchase of food supplies for impoverished women and children in Germany.
- Symphony No. 7 in C major, written by composer Jean Sibelius, was performed for the first time, as part of a concert in Stockholm.
- The films Secrets, starring Norma Talmadge, and The Enchanted Cottage, starring Richard Barthelmess and May McAvoy, were released.
- The Portuguese football club Sport Benfica e Castelo Branco was founded.
- Born:
  - Norman Fell (stage name for Norman Noah Feld), American film and TV actor known for the series Three's Company; in Philadelphia (d. 1998)
  - Abbas Abbasi, Pakistani politician, army officer and former member of royalty who served as Governor of Punjab province 1975-1977, Pakistani Minister for Religious Affairs 1981-1984, and former heir to the throne of the Bahawalpur princely state; in Bahawalpur (d. 1988)

== March 25, 1924 (Tuesday) ==
Kingdom of Greece

Hellenic Republic

- The Greek Parliament voted to depose King George II and declare the Second Hellenic Republic. A public referendum on the issue was set for April 13.
- The Montreal Canadiens of the National Hockey League (NHL) defeated the Calgary Tigers of the Western Canada Hockey League (WCHL), 3 to 0, to win the Stanley Cup, two games to none in a best-of-three series. The game was played in Ottawa because the natural ice at the March 22 first game at Montreal's Mount Royal Arena had turned to slush in warmer than normal temperatures, on a day with a high of 42 °F (6 °C).
- A three-man team of British fliers, led by navigator Archibald Stuart-MacLaren, accompanied by pilot William Noble Plenderleith and flight engineer Sergeant W. H. Andrews, became the first of six different groups to attempt the first trip around the world by airplane. The British team departed from Calshot Aerodrome, near Southampton, in a Vickers Vulture II Mark VI amphibious biplane. Other teams from the U.S., Portugal, France, Italy and Argentina, would depart between April and June on different routes to cover a global trip of at least 23,000 miles (37,000 km) with plans to return the site of their takeoff. The British attempt would eventually end on August 4 when Plenderleith was forced to make a forced sea landing in which the aircraft was badly damaged.
- Born: Roberts Blossom, American film actor and poet; in New Haven, Connecticut (d. 2011)

== March 26, 1924 (Wednesday) ==
- French Prime Minister Raymond Poincaré resigned after his government was defeated in the Chamber of Deputies by a vote of 271 to 264. The confidence vote was a complete surprise and Poincaré was not even present, as he was in a committee meeting when it was announced and voted on.
- Friedrich Akel became the new Rigivanem (literally the "State Elder"), the head of state and head of government for Estonia, after Konstantin Päts had announced his resignation on March 11.
- Over 100 people died in landslides around Amalfi in Italy.

== March 27, 1924 (Thursday) ==
- The first elected parliament in the Kingdom of Iraq, the 100-member Constituent Assembly, was opened in Baghdad by King Faisal I and directed to draw up the Middle Eastern nation's first constitution, which would be ratified in 1925.
- Raymond Poincaré accepted President Alexandre Millerand's request to form a new government.
- Erich Ludendorff and Adolf Hitler made their final addresses as their trial for treason wound down in Munich.
- The New York Philharmonic orchestra began its tradition of the Young People's Concerts, with guest conductor Ernest Schelling providing a description of aspects to be listened for in the music that would be heard, or about the parts of the orchestra itself. From 1926 onward, a concert would be performed every month.
- Irrelohe, a three-act opera by German composer Franz Schreker premiered at the Stadttheater Köln in Köln, with Otto Klemperer as conductor. Irrelohe, German for a crazy fire, was named by Schreker for the Irrenlohe station, a railway stop in Bavaria.
- Born:
  - Margaret K. Butler, American computer scientist, creator and director of the National Energy Software Center; in Evansville, Indiana (d. 2013)
  - Sarah Vaughan, American jazz singer; in Newark, New Jersey (d. 1990)
  - Herbert Zangs, German artist; in Krefeld (d. 2003)
  - William G. Bowdler, Argentine-born U.S. diplomat who served as Ambassador to El Salvador 1968—1971; Guatemala 1971—1973; and South Africa, 1975—1978; in Buenos Aires to British parents (d. 2016)
  - Rachel Cameron, Australian ballet dancer and teacher; in Brisbane (d. 2011)
- Died: John George Alexander Leishman, 66, U.S. diplomat and former steel company executive who had served as the Ambassador to the Ottoman Empire 1901—1909; Italy, 1909—1911; and Germany 1911—1913

== March 28, 1924 (Friday) ==
- U.S. Attorney General Harry M. Daugherty resigned over the Teapot Dome scandal.
- Total S.A., one of the major energy product and sales companies worldwide, was founded in France, under the name Campagnie Francaise des Petroles.
- The Grand National horse race at Aintree Racecourse in England was won by Master Robert, a 25 to 1 long shot, ridden by Bob Trudgill and trained by Aubrey Hastings.
- Born:
  - Freddie Bartholomew, British child actor; in London (d. 1992)
  - Hans Joachim Berker, German-born jurist and the first Chief Justice of Namibia; in Hamburg (d. 1992)
  - Claire Gagnier, Canadian soprano opera singer; in Montreal (d. 2022)
- Died:
  - Józef Sebastian Pelczar, 82, Polish Roman Catholic cleric, Bishop of Przemysl and co-founder of the Sister Servants of the Most Sacred Heart of Jesus; Pelczar would be elevated to sainthood in 2003.
  - Zoel García de Galdeano, 77, Spanish mathematician

== March 29, 1924 (Saturday) ==
- The first known Motocross in the United Kingdom took place at Camberley, Surrey, with a "scramble race" of 89 riders, rather than the individual time trials that had been staged by clubs. Rather than everyone starting at once, however, riders started once per minute, riding two laps on a challenging course 25 miles (40 km) long.
- The popular musical Wildflower, with music by Herbert Stothart and Vincent Youmans, and lyrics by Oscar Hammerstein II and Otto Harbach, closed at the Casino Theatre on Broadway after 477 performances, following its premiere on February 7, 1923.
- Jews in Bucharest in Romania were targeted by rioters in nighttime attacks that continued into the next morning.
- Born:
  - Andrew Frierson, African-American opera baritone singer, in Columbia, Tennessee (d. 2018)
  - Ahmad Zaidi Adruce, Malaysian hereditary ruler and governor of Sarawak; in Subang Jaya (d. 2000)
  - Jules de Corte, popular blind singer-songwriter in the Netherlands; in Deurne (d. 1996)
  - Plácido Fernández Viagas, Spanish politician and the first chairman of the government of regional government of Andalusia; in Tangier, Spanish Morocco (d. 1979)
  - Jackie Vernon (stage name for Ralph Verrone, American stand-up comedian and actor; in Manhattan (d. 1987)
- Died:
  - Charles Villiers Stanford, 71, Irish composer, conductor and teacher
  - Georgiana Hill, 65, British social historian, journalist and women's rights activist

== March 30, 1924 (Sunday) ==
- The first radio broadcaster in the German state of Bavaria, Bayerischer Rundfunk, began broadcasting from Munich at 5:00 in the afternoon under the name "Deutsche Stunde in Bayern".
- In the U.S., the drinking of denatured alcohol at a party in Toledo, Ohio killed at least 12 people.
- The German People's Party announced in its election platform that it stood for a "new democratic monarchy". One of their election slogans was, "We are fighting under the colours of the black, white and red".
- The historical drama film Beau Brummel, starring John Barrymore, was released.
- Born:
  - Arthur Henry White, American advertising executive, philanthropist and social activist known for co-founding the Reading Is Fundamental literacy organization; in Boston (d. 2014)
  - Alan Davidson, Irish-born New Zealand food critic; in Derry, Northern Ireland (d. 2003)
- Died: Glen MacDonough, 57, American opera librettist best known for 1903's Babes in Toyland

== March 31, 1924 (Monday) ==
- The air transport company Imperial Airways was founded in the United Kingdom by the merger of the UK's four existing airlines, Handley Page Transport, Instone Air Line, Daimler Airway and British Marine Air Navigation Co Ltd. The four combined their aircraft for a fleet of 13 planes operating out of Croydon Airport to serve international flights to and from London. In 1939, Imperial would merge with British Airways Ltd to form British Overseas Airways Corporation (BOAC), which would merge in 1974, fifty years from the day of Imperial's founding, with British European Airways to create British Airways.
- The London tram and bus drivers' strike ended after a vote on a new wage package from the transport companies.
- Born:
  - B. S. Perera (Balasuriyage Steven Perera), popular Sri Lankan stage and film actor who appeared in over 180 movies in a 22-year career; in Colombo, Ceylon (d. 1982)
  - Leo Buscaglia (pen name for Felice Leonardo Buscaglia), American professor, author and motivational speaker who popularized hugging in the U.S. in the 1970s and wrote multiple books, starting with Love in 1972; in Los Angeles (d. 1998)
