= MacEwen =

MacEwen, MacEwan, McEwen, or McEwan may refer to:

== People ==
- MacEwen (surname)

== Places ==
- Castle MacEwen, Argyll, Scotland
- MacEwan, Edmonton, a neighbourhood in Edmonton, Alberta, Canada
- MacEwan Glen, a neighbourhood in Calgary, Alberta, Canada
- McEwen, Oregon, an unincorporated community in the United States
- McEwen, Tennessee, a city in the United States
- Division of McEwen, an electoral district in the Australian House of Representatives in Victoria

== Other ==
- MacEwan University, a university in Edmonton, Alberta, Canada
  - MacEwan station, a light rail station serving the university
- McEwan Pratt, a British locomotive manufacturer from 1905 to 1914
- McEwan Pratt Petrol Railcar, type of railcar in New Zealand
- McEwens, former department store in Perth, Scotland
- Macewen's operation, operation for the cure of inguinal hernia, developed by Scottish surgeon Sir William Macewen (1864–1924)
- Macewen's sign, sign used to help to diagnose hydrocephalus (accumulation of excess cerebrospinal fluid) and brain abscesses
- McEwan's, a beer produced by the Caledonian brewery

== See also ==
- Clan Ewen of Otter
- Clan MacEwen
