= Heffler =

Heffler is a surname. Notable people with the surname include:

- Norbert Heffler (born 1990), Hungarian footballer, brother of Tibor
- Tibor Heffler (born 1987), Hungarian footballer

== See also ==
- Leffler
