= Janet Melrose =

- Born: 1860; Jedburgh
- Died: 1928 (aged 67–68); Crieff
- Occupation: Matron
- Employer: Glasgow Royal Infirmary
- Organization: Royal College of Nursing
- Honours: RRC

Janet Creelman Melrose RRC (1860-1928)

was a British nurse and leader of the nursing profession in Scotland. She was also matron of Glasgow Royal Infirmary from 1907 – 1921 and Principal Matron of the 3^{rd} Scottish General Hospital in World War 1.

== Early Years ==
Melrose was born in Jedburgh in 1860.

== Education and early career ==
Melrose completed her nurse training at the Glasgow Royal Infirmary (GRI) under Rebecca Strong. She then worked her way up to the position of Matron, spending 35 years in total working at Glasgow Royal Infirmary. She was appointed Matron in 1907 following the retirement of Rebecca Strong. She attended the International Council of Nurses meeting in Cologne in 1912. Melrose was Principal Matron of the Territorial Force Nursing Service (TFNS) 3^{rd} Scottish General Hospital at Stobhill during WW1.

Melrose resigned from her position as Matron on the grounds of ill health in 1921, following 14 years as Matron. She was gifted with skunk furs and a thermos flask from the nursing staff on her retirement. From other staff she received a Jacobean chair as well as travelling requisites. At her farewell celebration Melrose spoke of how latter years of her term as Matron had been challenging owing to the reconstruction of the hospital and the strenuous days of WW1. She was a champion for improved working conditions for nurses. When she was Matron generally nurses worked a 7 day, 58 hour week. The Hospital Board accepted this should be reduced for the benefit of the nurse’s health and the efficiency of the hospital. But the Royal could not afford the expense of the extra staff and providing accommodation for more nurses. In 1919 a total of 100 nurses left, and it was increasingly difficult to find replacements with nurses able to earn higher salaries in other hospitals. There were some small pay rises made. With an increase in unemployment in 1920 the staffing problem eased. In 1921 there was a nursing staff of 270 with a waiting list of 50 women. This followed the passing of the Nurses Registration (Scotland) Act and the commencement of the General Nursing Council for Scotland and a national system of exams. The first nurses to sit the state exams at GRI did so in 1924.

Melrose was a keen member of the College of Nursing and one of the original members of the Scottish Board. She was also one of the founders of the Scottish Matrons’ Association. In 1925 they instigated a benevolent fund for retired nurses, something Melrose strongly supported. From the beginning of the King Edward V11 Memorial Fund for Retired Nurses, she worked hard to support it. She was interested in the Edinburgh Home for retired nurses at 9, Chamberlain Rd and was the leader in the scheme for opening a similar home in Glasgow – Hazelwood House.

== Death ==
Melrose died on 24 December 1928, age 68 years. She resided at The Hydro, Crieff prior to her death. Her funeral service was held in the chapel of the GRI. Colonel Macintosh represented the Scottish Board of the College of Nursing and Miss Gregory Smith represented the Scottish Matrons’ Association.

== Honours ==
Melrose was decorated by King George V with Royal Red Cross in 1916 for her war efforts. A Bar was awarded in 1920.
