= Christina Deans Elmslie =

British military nurse

Christina Deans Elmslie CBE, RRC
- Born: June 1, 1869; Aberdeen
- Occupation: Miltary nurse

Christina Deans Elmslie, CBE, RRC, was a British military nurse and matron of the Queen Alexandra's Military Families' Nursing Service.

== Early life ==
Elmslie was born on 1 June 1869 in Aberdeen. Her father's occupation was farmer.

== Education and early career ==
Elmslie worked in City Fever Hospital, Edinburgh from 1893 to 1894. She then trained as a nurse at Glasgow Royal Infirmary from 1895 to 1900. Elmslie joined the Princess Christian's Army Nursing Service (Reserve) service number 633. She served in the Boer War leaving for South Africa in June 1900. She was registered with The Society for the State Registration of Trained Nurses in 1905, entry number 1387. She achieved her registration with the Central Midwives Board in 1909. She also worked for the Queen Alexandra's Imperial Military Nursing Service (Reserve) as matron at the Military Isolation Hospital Aldershot. Elmslie was appointed with the Queen Alexandra's Military Families' Nursing Service (QAMFNS) on 20 December 1919 and became matron in March 1921. It was reported that in 1910 a deserter and orderly nurse from the Royal Army Medical Corps broke into the matron's quarters and stole Elmslie's dressing case and fittings including two South African medals.

== Personal life ==
Elmslie retired to Middleton-on-Sea, Sussex on 1 June 1924 after over 23 years military nursing service with permission to retain the badge of Q.A.M.F.N.S.

== Death ==
She died 9 July 1961 at The Home of the Convent of the Holy Rood, Findon, Worthing age 92.

== Honours ==
Elmslie received her Royal Red Cross on 1 January 1916 for valuable services in connection with the war while working at the Military Isolation Hospital, Aldershot . Elmslie received her CBE on 3 June 1919 with her investure held on 12 October at Buckingham Palace.
