= Edith G Manners =

Matron of Glasgow Royal Infirmary

- Born: 12 June 1899; Blyth, Northumberland
- Died: 3 September 1966 (aged 67); Glasgow
- Known for: Matron Glasgow Royal Infirmary

Edith Gertrude Manners OBE, RGN, SCM (12 June 1899 – 3 September 1966) was matron of Glasgow Royal Infirmary from 1947-1960 during the change from it being a voluntary hospital to being part of the National Health Service in 1948.

== Early life ==
Manners was born on 12 June 1899, in Blyth, Northumberland, England. Her father, William Henry Manners, was 34 and her mother, Edith Mary Price, was 25.

== Nursing career ==
Manners did her nurse training at Glasgow Royal Infirmary. She also worked there as a ward sister, sister tutor and night sister. From January to November 1932 she had experience of private nursing in connection with the Rutland Street Trained Nurses’ Association, Edinburgh. She took up various positions in the UK including working in the General Hospital Birmingham, and as an assistant matron at Royal Infirmary Aberdeen from 1937. Manners also worked at Gleneagles Hospital, Scotland. She was matron at Greenock Royal Infirmary immediately prior to being appointed matron at Glasgow Royal Infirmary in 1947, a position she held until 1960. The role of matron also included being President of the Glasgow Royal Infirmary Nurses League. During her time as matron she objected to proposed staffing cuts citing that comparative higher staffing levels was due to the environmental conditions of the surrounding area such as poor quality housing, serious social problems and a lack of general practitioner services.

Manners was elected to the General Nursing Council for Scotland in 1950 and was also an examiner. In 1953 Manners was Chairman of the Working Party of the Nuffield Provincial Hospitals Trust The Work of Nurses in Hospital Wards: Report of a Job Analysis. In 1956 Manners was invited by the Department of Health for Scotland and the Nuffield Trust in conjunction with the Board of Management of Glasgow Royal Infirmary to be responsible for an experimental comprehensive nurse training course.

== Death ==
Manners died on 3 September 1966, in Glasgow, Lanarkshire, Scotland, at the age of 67 after a long illness.

== Honours ==
Manners was awarded OBE in 1957.
