= Glasgow Royal Infirmary =

- NHS Greater Glasgow and Clyde
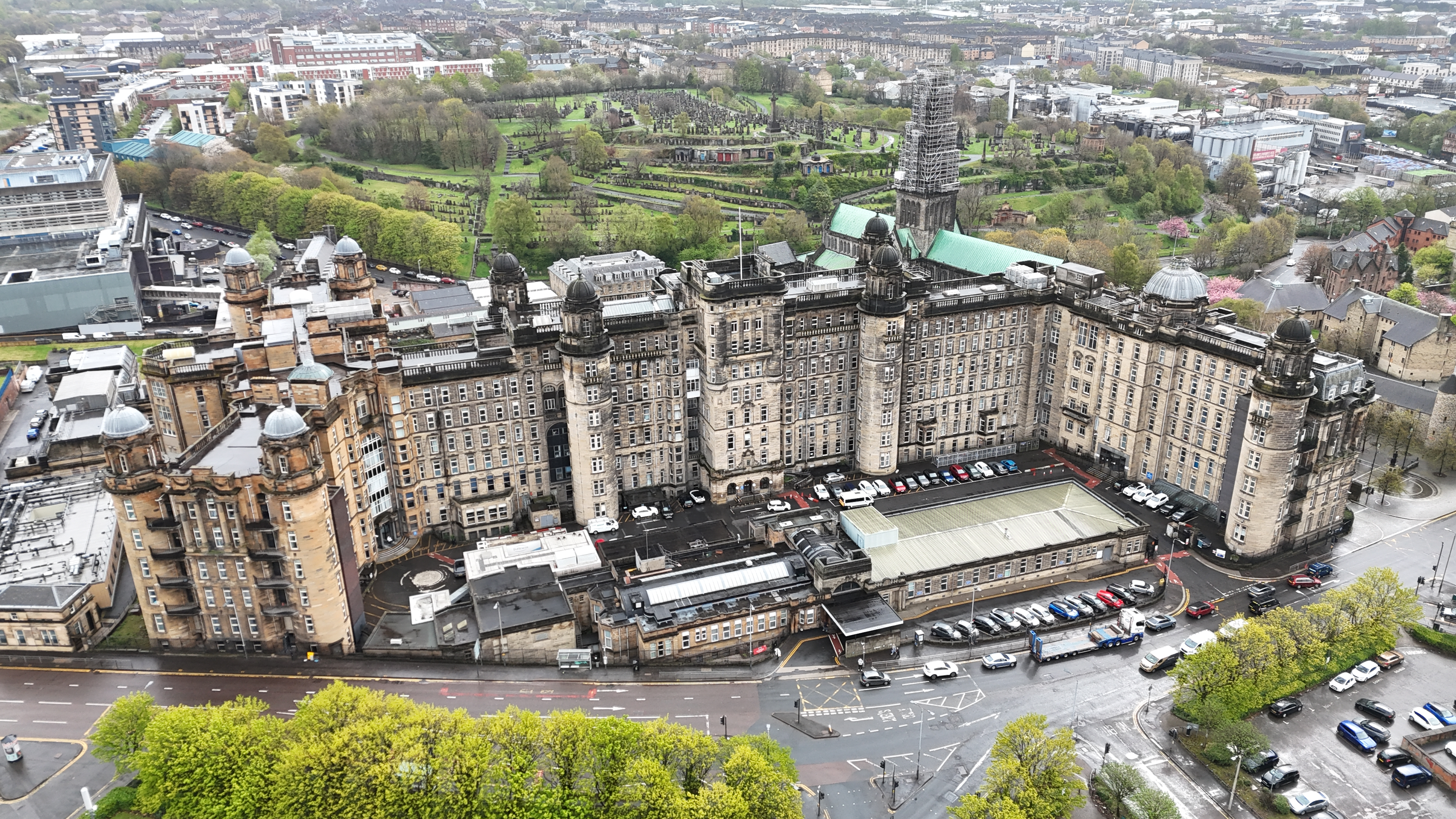
- Aerial view of Royal Infirmary's west-facing Centre Block

- Location within Glasgow

Geography
- Location: Castle Street, Townhead, Glasgow, Scotland
- Coordinates: 55°51′52.06″N 4°14′3.04″W

Organisation
- Care system: NHS Scotland
- Type: Teaching
- Affiliated university: University of Glasgow

Services
- Emergency department: Yes
- Beds: 1077
- Speciality: Cardiology, Plastic Surgery; Gynaecology

History
- Founded: 1794; Rebuilt (I) 1909-1924; Rebuilt (II) 1974-82

Links
- Website: Glasgow Royal Infirmary
- Lists: Hospitals in Scotland

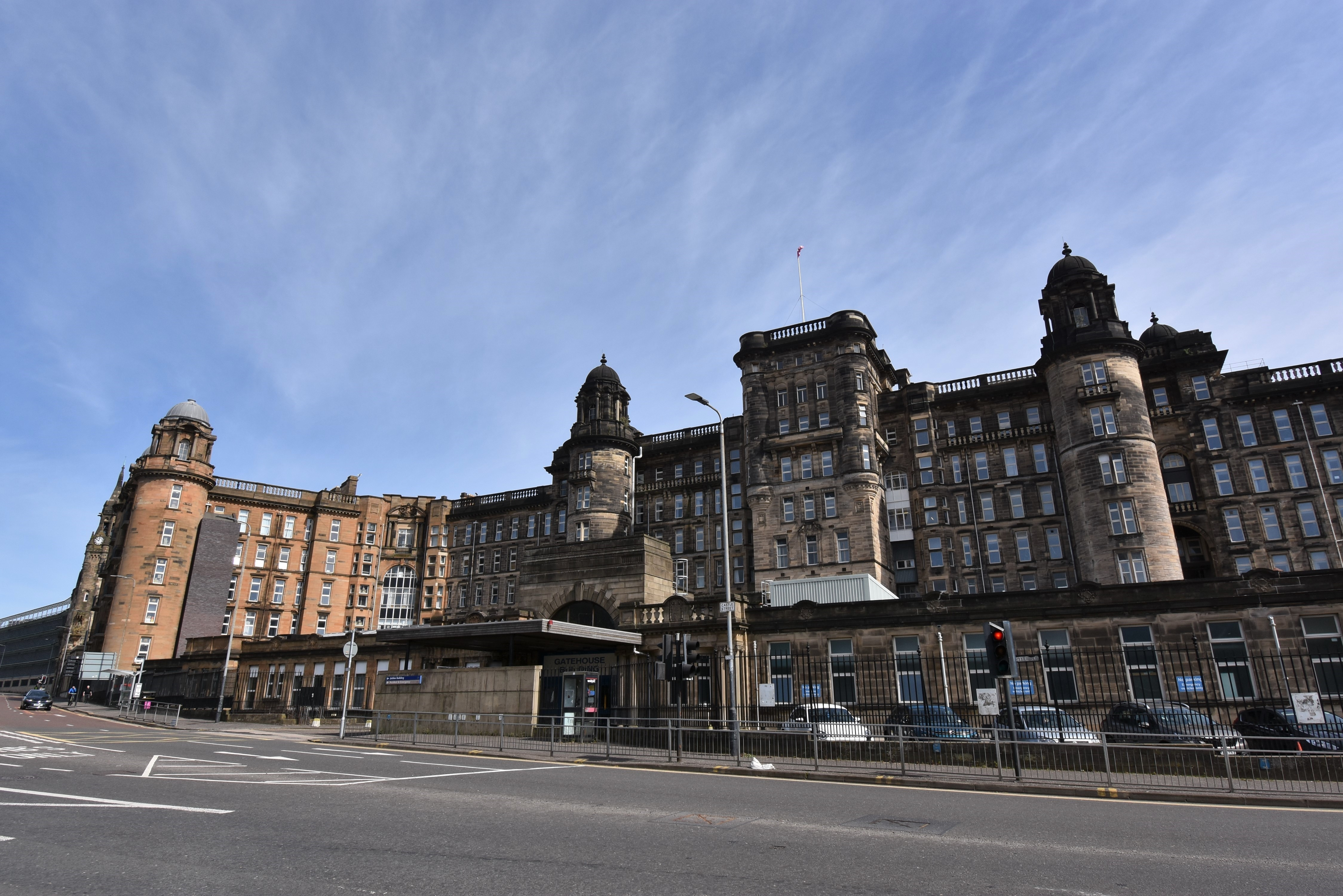
The Royal Infirmary's west-facing Centre Block

The Glasgow Royal Infirmary (GRI) is a large teaching hospital. With a capacity of around 1,000 beds, the hospital campus covers an area of around 8 hectares (20 acres), and straddles the Townhead and Dennistoun districts on the north-eastern fringe of the city centre of Glasgow, Scotland. It is managed by NHS Greater Glasgow and Clyde. It was originally opened in 1794, with the present main building dating from 1914, with a major extension built between 1974 and 1982.

== History ==
=== Founding of the infirmary ===
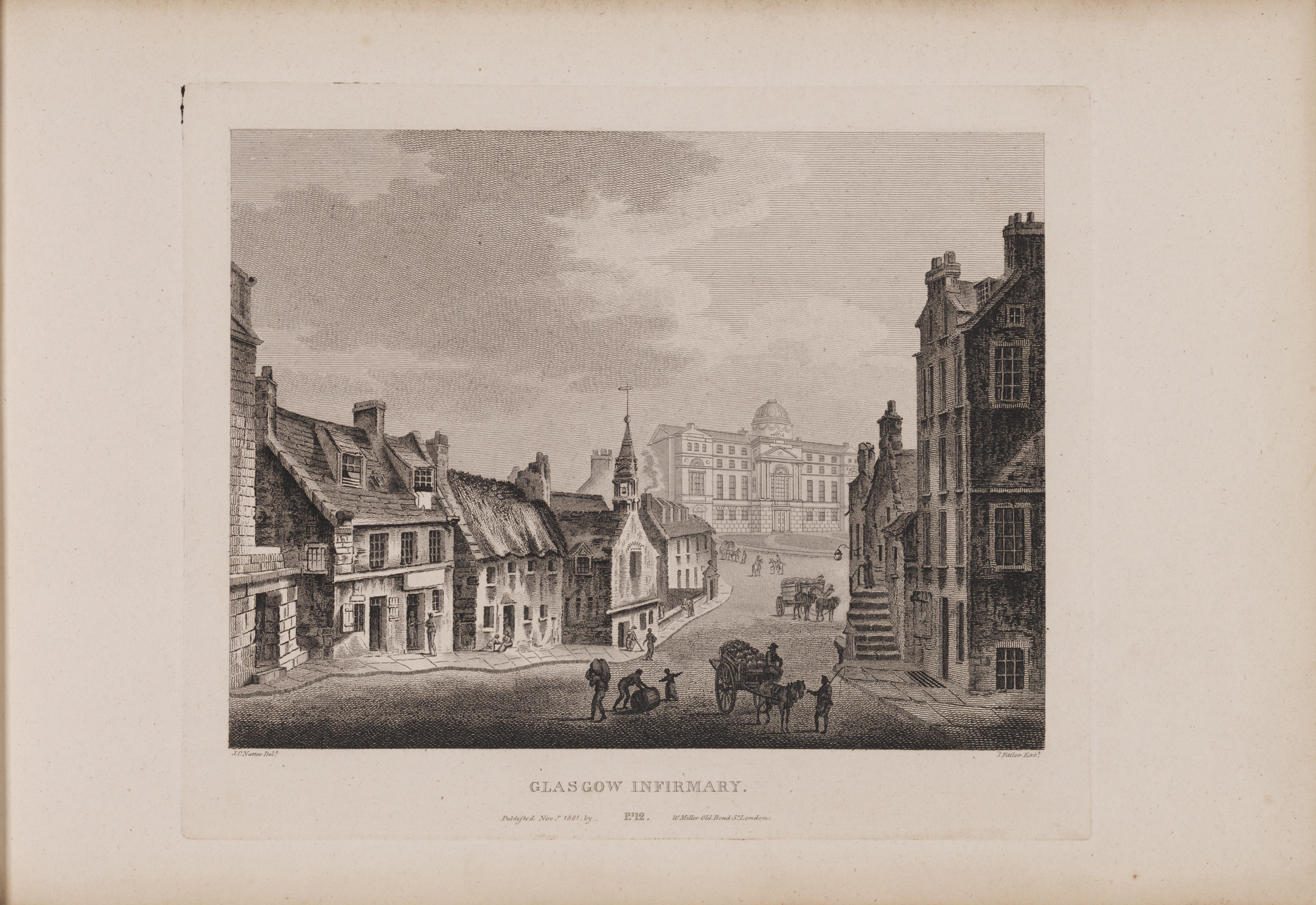
Etching of a view of the infirmary by James Fittler in Scotia Depicta, published 1804

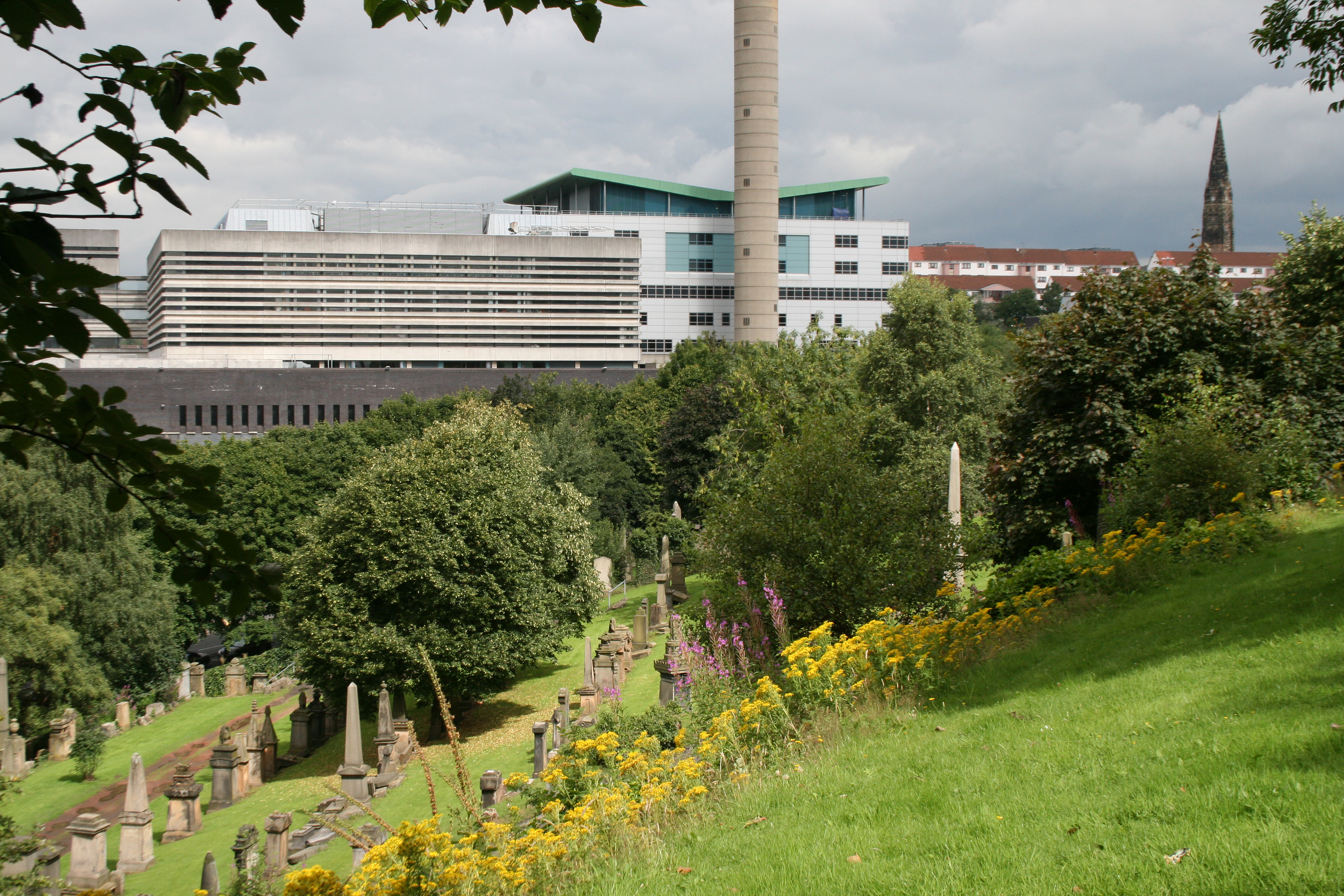
The New Buildings (post-1974) at the Glasgow Royal Infirmary, viewed from the Necropolis. The Queen Elizabeth Building, completed in 1981, is in the foreground. The newer Princess Royal Maternity Hospital, opened in 2001, is just behind and to the right. The University Teaching Block is on the left hand side, adjoining the 1981 building.

A Royal Charter was obtained in 1791 granting the Crown-owned land to the hospital. The infirmary was built beside Glasgow Cathedral on land that held the ruins of the Bishop's Castle, which dated from at least the 13th century but had been allowed to fall into disrepair. George Jardine, Professor of Logic, was appointed the first manager in January 1793.

Designed by Robert and James Adam, the original Royal Infirmary building was opened in December 1794. The original Adams building had five floors (one underground) holding eight wards (giving the hospital just over a hundred beds) and a circular operating room on the fourth floor with a glazed dome ceiling. After a number of additional buildings were added, the first in 1816, a specialist fever block in 1829 and a surgical block in 1860.

=== St Mungo's College Medical School ===
St Mungo's College Medical School was set up in 1876 by the medical teachers of the Glasgow Royal Infirmary, after the university had migrated westwards and set up the new Western Infirmary for clinical teaching. At first their students could not take the university examinations. St Mungo's College also had a non-university law school, which prepared accountants and law agents but not advocates. In 1947 it was absorbed into the University of Glasgow's Faculty of Medicine.

=== Glasgow Royal Infirmary School of Nursing ===
Rebecca Strong OBE (1843–1944) is regarded as one of the earliest pioneers of nurse education. In 1879 she was appointed Matron at the Glasgow Royal Infirmary. There was no organised teaching for nurses anywhere until 1893, when Strong opened a Preliminary Training School for Nurses at the Glasgow Royal Infirmary. With the support of Glasgow surgeon Sir William Macewen, Strong initiated the ‘block apprenticeship’ training programme. This consisted of short periods of instruction in the hospital school followed by periods of practice on the wards. This was a great improvement on previous nurse instruction whereby nurses were expected to attend lectures and study while still working long hours on the wards.

Two courses were arranged in conjunction with the Professors of St. Mungo's College - a three months' course focused on elementary Anatomy, Physiology and Hygiene. On passing examinations in these subjects a second course was given which consisted of Medicine, Surgery and Practical Nursing. The prospective nurse was then able to enter the hospital with this theoretical knowledge. Strong retired in 1907. Over the course of her career at the GRI she fought to improve the conditions for nurses and elevated nursing to the status of a profession.

In 1956 an experimental nurse training programme was introduced at Glasgow Royal Infirmary. The motivation for this course was to address issues around attracting students to nursing, reducing student attrition rates, improving patient care and increasing the number of trained staff.

=== New building ===
The original Adams building was replaced with a new building designed by James Miller and opened by King George V in July 1914. In 1926, the surgical block in which Joseph Lister had worked was also torn down for replacement.

=== Post-war redevelopment ===
Following the amalgamation of the old St. Mungo's College of Medicine into the University of Glasgow Medical School in 1947, the old College buildings on Castle Street officially became part of the hospital campus. In 1948 the hospital became part of NHS Scotland.

Visions of a brand new hospital on the site had been part of the Bruce Report as early as the late 1940s, but by 1974, the Greater Glasgow Health Board had formally begun plans for the replacement of the 1914 Miller buildings with a brand new building. This would be located on the north of the hospital site overlooking Alexandra Parade and the M8 motorway. The new building was designed by Sir Basil Spence in a "modular" fashion, where new blocks could be easily added in phases as funding allowed. In the end, only the first phase of Spence's original design was implemented and was finally completed around 1982. It also incorporated new accommodation for the hospital's teaching departments, thus replacing the old St. Mungo's College buildings. The new complex was linked to the Surgical Block of the original Royal Infirmary building at basement level via a link corridor, with a further pedestrian entrance at lower basement level on Wishart Street (adjacent to the Necropolis). The new facility was officially named the "Queen Elizabeth Building" by the Queen on a visit in July 1986. Since 1982 the pre-1915 buildings of the Infirmary have been protected as a category B listed building.

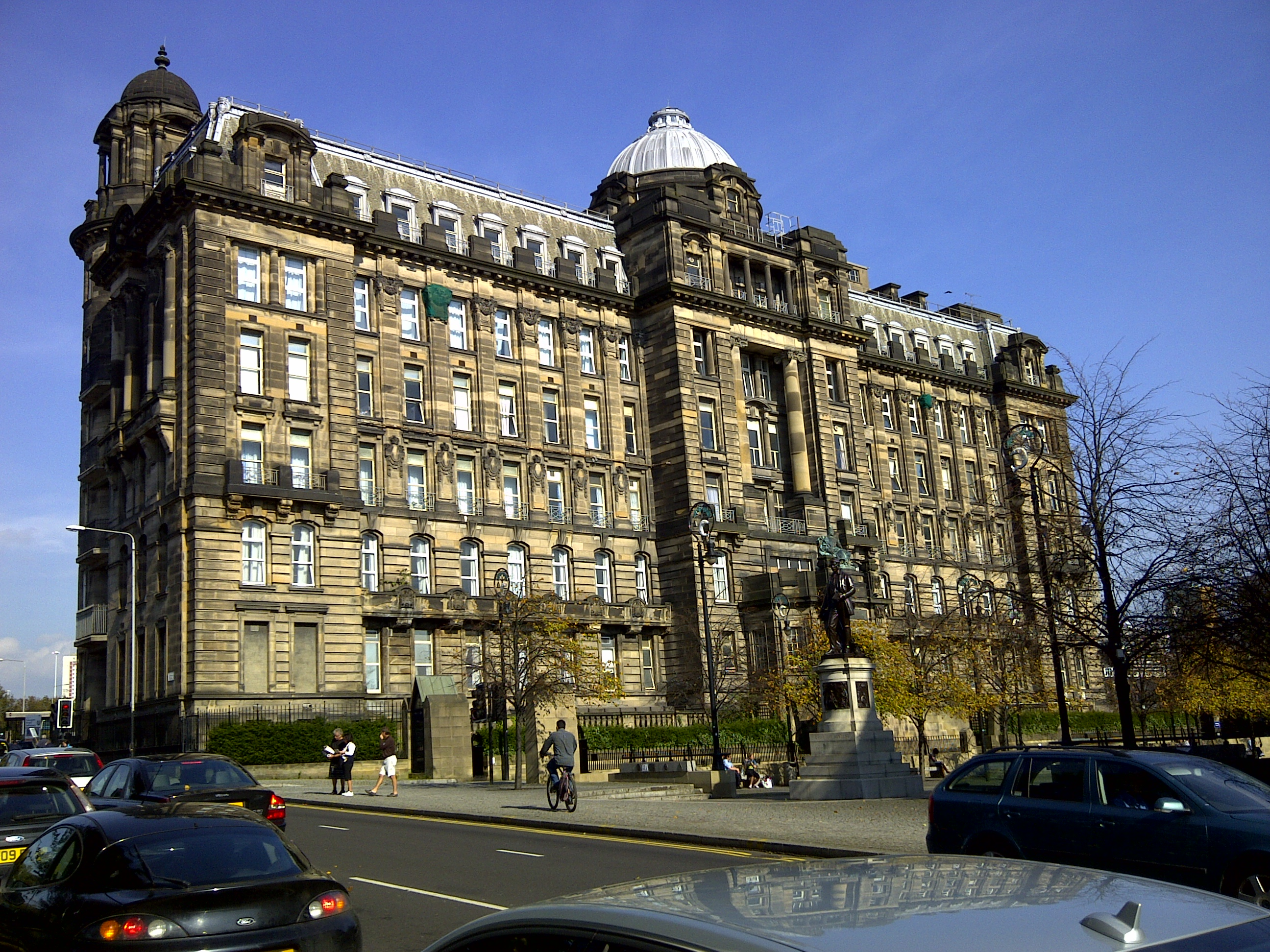
The south face of the Medical Block of the Glasgow Royal as seen from High Street

After the closure of the Rutherglen Maternity Hospital and the old Glasgow Royal Maternity Hospital at Rottenrow, a new maternity block was added to the New Building; the Princess Royal Maternity Hospital opened in 2001. Following the closure of Canniesburn Hospital, the Jubilee Building was opened, adding purpose-built Accident & Emergency facilities and a plastic surgery unit, in November 2002.

Following the transfer of the Golden Jubilee Hospital (formerly the HCI Hospital) in Clydebank to public ownership, much of the cardiology specialism was moved from GRI to the newer facility.

== Notable staff and research ==
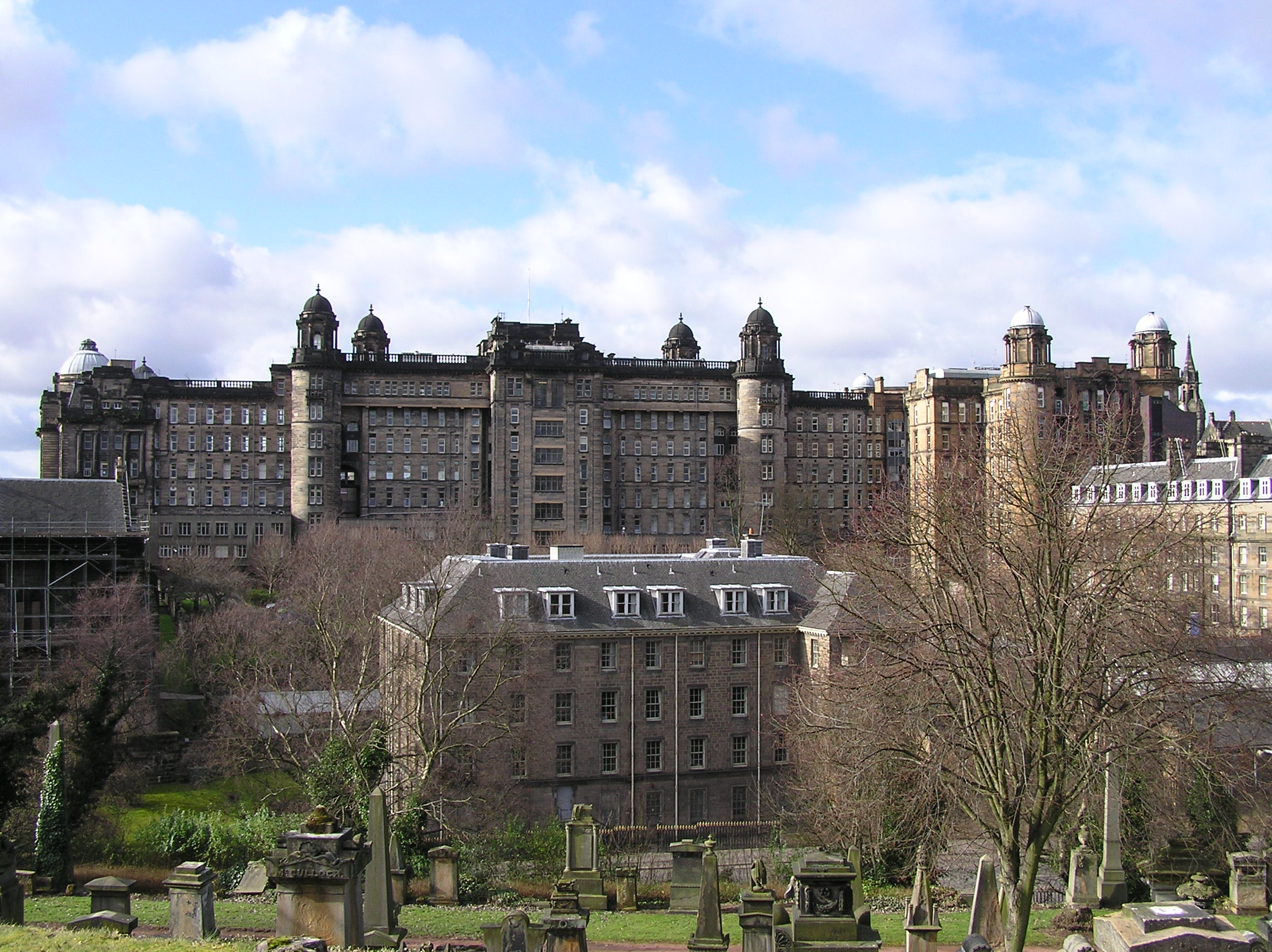
The rear of the Glasgow Royal Infirmary's 1914 Centre Block in the background with the Estates building in the foreground, viewed from the Glasgow Necropolis

In 1856, Joseph Lister became an assistant surgeon at the Infirmary and a professor of surgery in 1860. Running the new surgery block, Lister noted that about half of his patients died from sepsis. Lister experimented to find ways to prevent sepsis. This experimentation lead to using carbolic acid to clean instruments; he is now considered the "father of modern surgery".

In 1875, a student of Lister, William Macewen joined the Infirmary surgery as an assistant surgeon, becoming a full surgeon in 1877. While at the Infirmary he introduced the practice of doctors wearing sterilisable white coats and pioneered operations on the brain for tumours, abscesses and trauma.

In 1896, John Macintyre, Medical Electrician at the Infirmary, opened one of the first radiological departments in the world.

In 1908, one of MacEwen's students James Pringle, developed the Pringle manoeuvre which is used to control bleeding during liver surgery.

In the 1950s Professor Ian Donald, working in the field of obstetrics and gynaecology, was one of the pioneers of diagnostic ultrasound.

== Notable nurses of the Glasgow Royal Infirmary ==
=== Matrons ===
- Rebecca Strong OBE was matron from 1879 to 1907.
- Janet Creelman Melrose was appointed matron in 1907 following the retirement of Strong. She resigned in 1921 due to ill health.
- Mary Steuart Donaldson was matron from 1921–1925.
- Margaret Elizabeth Williamson was matron from 1925–1932.
- Marget Husband, Royal Red Cross (RRC) was appointed matron in 1932
- E.G. Manners, OBE, was matron from 1947 – 1960. She received her OBE in 1957.
- Anne Hayes Court Brown, OBE, was matron from 1960 – 1966. She then took up the position of regional nursing officer to the Western Regional Health Board. She received her OBE in 1974.
- Betty P Millar was appointed matron in 1967 until resigning in 1969.
- Margaret I Thomson was appointed Principal Nursing Officer in 1969.

=== Other notable nurses ===
- Williamina Barclay, who trained as a nurse at GRI, instigated the evacuation of St Kilda in 1930.
- Kate Carruthers MM, started her training at GRI in 1907 before going on to have a military nursing career.
- Mary Cronk, MBE, trained at GRI and then worked as an independent midwife.
- Emily Miller worked as a nurse in GRI before becoming the first woman police officer employed by the City of Glasgow Police.
- Màiri Mhòr nan Òran, also known as Great Mary of the Songs, qualified with a nursing certificate and diploma in obstetrics from GRI.
- Catherine Stronach, CBE, RRC, trained at GRI and had a distinguished military nursing career.
- Christina Deans Elmslie, CBE, RRC trained at GRI from 1895 to 1900 and had a distinguished military nursing career.
- Gertrude H Lindsay, military career with Scottish Women's Hospital at Royaumont, trained at GRI.

The four nurses who died in First World War are named on the bronze memorial. They are Agnes Murdoch Climie, (trained 1906, killed by enemy air bomb 30 September 1917 while on duty at 58th Scottish General Hospital, France); May Grant, (worked at no 4 Scottish General Hospital, Stobhill from 15 February 1915 until she died of pneumonia on 2 November 1918); Helen Hastings (trained from January 1904 until June 1909, and worked at Stobhill from 13 August 1915 until she died there very suddenly on 23 July 1918); and Christina Wilson (trained from January 1905 until December 1907, died on service abroad in March 1916).

== The Friends of GRI charity and museum ==
In May 2020 the Friends of GRI charity was formed. In 2022 a small museum opened in the grounds of the Glasgow Royal Infirmary staffed by volunteers. Entry is free of charge and website has the current opening times.

In the main block of the Old Building there is a bronze memorial to the staff of GRI who died in the First World War.

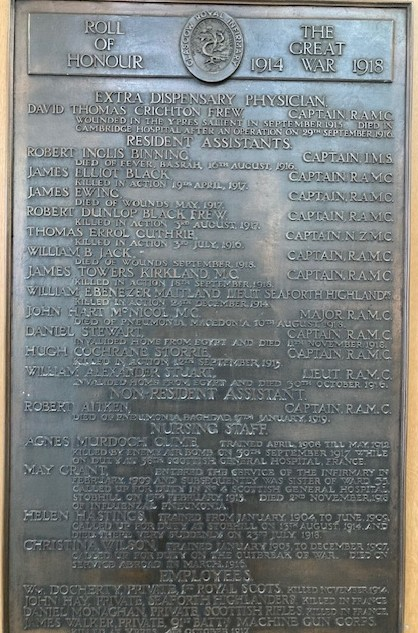
A memorial listing the staff of GRI who died in the First World War
