= Leffler =

Leffler is a surname. Notable people with the surname include:

- Anne Charlotte Leffler (1849–1892), Swedish author
- Edward G. Leffler, salesman who started the first mutual fund
- Frederick H. Leffler (died 1953), American politician and newspaperman
- Gösta Mittag-Leffler (1846–1927), Swedish mathematician
- Greg Leffler (born 1951), former driver in the CART Championship Car series
- Isaac Leffler (1788–1866), represented Virginia's 18th congressional district in the US House of Representatives in the 1820s
- Jason Leffler (1975–2013), NASCAR/Indy Car driver from Long Beach, California
- John Leffler, former Australian racing driver
- John Compton Leffler (1900-1987), Episcopal priest, dean of St. Mark's Cathedral, Seattle (1951-1971)
- Marta Leffler (1903–1990), American actress better known as Marta Linden
- Melvyn P. Leffler, American historian, and Edward Stettinius Professor of History at the University of Virginia
- Samuel J Leffler, computer scientist, known for his extensive work on BSD, from the 1980s to FreeBSD in the present day
- Shepherd Leffler (1811–1879), one of the two original U.S. Representatives from Iowa

== See also ==
- 28394 Mittag-Leffler (1999 RY36) is a main-belt asteroid discovered on September 13, 1999, by P. G. Comba at Prescott
- Mittag-Leffler's theorem
- Mittag-Leffler function
- Mittag-Leffler Institute, mathematical research institute located in Djursholm, a suburb of Stockholm
- Mittag-Leffler star of a complex-analytic function is a set in the complex plane obtained by attempting to extend that function along rays emanating from a given point
