= Catherine Stronach =

Catherine Geddes Stronach CBE, RRC+Bar (28 June 1875–16 Feb 1962) nurse and principal matron, had a long and distinguished career with the Queen Alexandra's Imperial Military Nursing Service.

== Early life ==
Stronach was born in Glasgow, Scotland on 28 June 1875. Her father was a banker.

== Education and early career ==
Stronach attended Westbourne Gardens School, Glasgow. She did her general nurse training at the Glasgow Royal Infirmary from 30 September 1896 until May 1900. She then went to South Africa in 1900 for one year as a nursing sister.

Stronach joined the Queen Alexandra's Imperial Military Nursing Service on 12 May 1903 as a staff nurse. From April 1901 to May 1903 she had been in the Army Nursing Service Reserves. She was promoted to sister in 1904. She was in Egypt from May 1905 to July 1907.

She was in Etaples, France when she was awarded RRC in 1914 as part of the British Expeditionary Force.

She was mentioned in despatches in 1916. She was promoted to the rank of matron on 1 September 1919. She was the matron at the Alexandra Hospital, Cosham, Portsmouth from March 1920 to October 1922.

She embarked for Hong Kong in October 1922 and was there until December 1925. She worked in Aldershot, Cambridge from January 1926 - December 1926. She became principal matron in 1926 and in December of that year embarked for India.

== Death ==
She died 16 Feb 1962.

== Honours ==
She was awarded Royal Red Cross (RRC) in 1914.

She was awarded RRC + Bar in 1920.

She was awarded CBE in 1928.
