= Marget Husband =

British nurse

Marget Husband RRC, SRN, SCM, (1887 - 1986) was a British nurse.

== Early life ==
Husband was born in Struthers, Cupar, Fife. She was the eldest daughter of David Husband, JP, a farmer. She was educated at Craigrothie and Ceres public schools, the Bell-Baxter and Bonvil schools, Cupar and Skerry’s College, Dundee.

== Education and early career ==
Husband started working as a VAD in 1914 in Cupar before undertaking her midwifery training at Simpson Memorial Hospital, Edinburgh. Husband then completed her nurse training at Aberdeen Royal Infirmary with the award of distinction in 1918. She was a sister at the Hospice High Street Edinburgh, Night Maternity Sister, Dundee Royal Infirmary and Night Sister Aberdeen Royal Infirmary. She then worked as an assistant matron of Aberdeen Royal Hospital for Sick Children.

Husband also worked as Assistant Matron at the Royal Infirmary Cardiff and was Matron at the Royal Gwent Hospital, Newport from 1926 to 1932. Husband was appointed matron of the Glasgow Royal Infirmary in 1932. She continued in this role until her retirement in 1947.

Husband was an examiner for the nursing council for England and Wales. She was Principal Matron of the Territorial Army Nursing Service from 1933 to 1950 with the rank of lieutenant-colonel.

She was appointed to the Executive Committee of the National Council of Nurses of Great Britain and Northern Ireland in 1934. She was also on the Congress Arrangements Committee of the International Council of Nurses representing Scottish nurses in 1936. She was made a life manager of Aberdeen Royal Infirmary in 1945.

She resigned from her position on the Royal College of Nursing Council in 1947 having been on their Committee since 1936.

== Personal life ==
Following her retirement she moved first to Perthshire and then back to Ceres. She was a keen gardener.

== Death ==
She died in Gibson House, St Andrews age 98.

== Honours ==
Husband was awarded the RRC for services to nursing by King George VI in 1943. She was awareded the Territorial Army Nursing Service Medal in 1945.
