= Moon Car =

Vehicle used by the Irish Republican Army

The Moon Car was a converted 1919 Rolls-Royce Silver Ghost, used by the Irish Republican Army (IRA) in and around the area of Cork. It got the name 'Moon Car' because of its bright yellow colour and because it was mainly used at night. It is most well-known for its attack on the British port of Spike Island on 21 March 1924, which killed one British soldier and injured 23 others, including five civilians.

== Previous ownership ==
There are contrasting accounts over previous ownership of the car. One source reports that the car had previously been owned by the poet Oliver St. John Gogarty.

However, other sources say the car was owned by the Adamson family in County Galway, and the IRA then commandeered their car when the Adamson house was burned in 1921.

== Early use ==
It was initially used in the Irish War of Independence by the Cork No 1. Brigade of the IRA. Storage cases beneath the chassis were constructed to contain the Lewis guns when they were not in use. Armour plating was also added to protect the occupants.

== Attack on Spike Island ==
=== Background ===
On 21 March 1924, approximately five senior officers of the IRA, disillusioned with the British retaining ownership of several ports following the creation of the Free State, sought to try and start violence between the two countries. One of those involved is believed to have been Frank Busteed. They planned to attack British soldiers at Spike Island, an island the British retained off Cobh. They disguised themselves using captured National Army uniforms.

=== The attack ===
They opened fire on a harbour launch with two Lewis guns, presumably going between the Island and the mainland. One soldier was killed, seventeen soldiers were wounded, and five civilians were wounded. The one fatality was the 18 year old Private Herbert Aspinall. All of the soldiers were unarmed.

While escaping, it fired some shots at HMS Scythe but did not cause any serious damage.

Other accounts state that the attack happened when British soldiers were disembarking onto the quayside at Cobh, to then embark another ship to take them to Spike Island.

=== Aftermath ===
The car was deemed 'too hot' and had to be disposed of. One account says that the IRA buried it near Donoughmore. Others that it was burnt then the remains buried.

The Irish Free State offered £10,000 reward for information leading to the arrest of those involved in the attack. William T Cosgrave, the president of Dáil Éireann, dismissed the attack as "a dastardly outrage". The response in the House of Commons included one MP declaring "Ireland needed another Cromwell."

== Rediscovery and cultural significance ==
In 1981 Liam O’Callaghan found the car but it ended up in a scrap yard in Waterfall all the same. It was not until Andrew Daly found it there in 2006 that the true importance of the car was discovered. It went through a three-year restoration project by James Black Restorations, based in County Antrim. It has since been valued at over €2,000,000. In January 2020 it was donated to the National Museum of Ireland.

On 6 May 2017, the Moon Car returned to Cobh Pier for Cobh Readers & Writers Festival to mark the release of "Death on the Pier", a book written by John Jefferies on the Moon Car.
