= Kate Carruthers =

Scottish nurse (1887–1969)

Catherine Kate Carruthers (1887–1969) was a Scottish nurse.

== Early life ==
Carruthers was born in Partick, Glasgow in May 1887. She had a twin sister, Margaret who was born 5 minutes later. Her father was a ship's surveyor and marine engineer for the Board of Trade. By the time Carruthers was eight the family had settled in Langside, Glasgow.

== Education and early career ==
Carruthers started her nurse training at the Glasgow Royal Infirmary in 1907. She worked there until 1911. In 1911 Carruthers was appointed as a staff nurse at the Rotunda Hospital in Dublin, Ireland. From 1911 – April 1912 she worked at the Belfast Maternity Hospital and then at the Belfast Nurses Home Frederick St. from November 1912 until January 1914. She then returned to Glasgow and worked at the Govan Nurses Training Home from January - August 1914.

In 1914 Carruthers joined the Territorial Force Nursing Service, and was based at the 4th Scottish General Hospital, Stobhill, Glasgow, before moving to No 56 (also called 1/1 South Midland) Casualty Clearing Station (CCS), France, arriving on Christmas Day 1914. On 15th November 1916 the clearing station was bombed by enemy aeroplanes. Two people were killed and 14 were injured with Carruthers receiving injuries to her head and legs. Despite her injuries she stayed on duty setting up a new shelter and attending to casualties for the next twenty fours hours before help arrived. She then spent some weeks recovering in hospital.

Carruthers represented the Royal Infirmary of Glasgow Nurses League on The National Council of Nurses of Great Britain.

== Personal life ==
Carruthers had a twin sister, Margaret, who also became a nurse and joined the British Expeditionary Force as part of the war effort. She was posted to France in May 1916. She had one brother who died aged 22 from a brain tumour. She had another brother, Lieutenant William Carruthers who died, also age 22, while on duty during the Arras Offensive with 154th Field Company, The Royal Engineers.

Carruthers and her sister retired to Largs.

== Death ==
Carruthers died in 1969 in Largs.

== Honours ==
Carruthers received the Military Medal (MM) for her devotion to duty under fire in France during World War 1.

She was also mentioned in Sir Douglas Haig's Despatches.

She received the Royal Red Cross in 1919.
