= Rebecca Strong =

British nurse 1843-1944

- Born: Rebecca Thorogood; 23 August 1843; London, England
- Died: 24 April 1944 (aged 100); Vicars Cross, Cheshire, England
- Occupation: Nurse
- Employer(s): Nightingale Training School at St Thomas's Hospital, Dundee Royal Infirmary, Glasgow Royal Infirmary
- Known for: Pioneering preliminary training for nurses

Rebecca Strong OBE (23 August 1843 – 24 April 1944) was a British nurse who pioneered preliminary training for nurses.

== Early years and education ==
Rebecca Strong (née Thorogood) was born in Aldgate, East London on the 23 August 1843. Her father was the proprietor of the Blue Boar Inn. Married young and widowed by the age of twenty, Strong decided to go into a career in nursing and was accepted as one of the first probationers at the Nightingale Training School at St Thomas's Hospital, London in 1867. Strong continued her training at Winchester Hospital before moving to the British Army Hospital at Netley as part of a team of nurses selected to reorganise nursing at the hospital.

== Career ==
Strong was appointed matron of Dundee Royal Infirmary in 1874. She took up the post of matron, installed at the behest of Florence Nightingale at Glasgow Royal Infirmary in 1879. She was also encouraged to take up this post by William McEwen, a surgeon, who had been impressed by her work in Dundee.

While Strong was Matron at Glasgow Royal, she worked alongside two assistants, Miss Mackie and Miss Wood. They worked together to give further classroom education assisted by doctors from the medical and surgical specialities. Although this was worthwhile and appreciated by the nurses, their long working hours and little rest time made it difficult for the nurses to learn. Despite requests from Strong for better working conditions for the nurses this was too slow in being approved, which lead Strong to resign.

Apart from a period between 1885 and 1891 when she ran her own nursing home, she remained at Glasgow until she retired in 1907.

Strong was re-appointed Matron at the Royal Infirmary, Glasgow in 1891. This followed a speech by Sir William Macewen at the annual Glasgow Royal Infirmary meeting when he suggested that a preliminary nurse training programme could commence. He suggested that instruction in elementary anatomy, physiology and hygiene could be delivered at St Mungo’s College. Following completion of this, a second more practical course on Medical and Surgical nursing could be delivered on the wards.

In 1893 at Glasgow Royal Infirmary Strong started its first training school for nurses, based on Nightingale's model, and her methods were later widely adopted by the profession. The elementary anatomy, physiology and hygiene element was conducted over 3 months with an exam at the end.

Strong was a committed supporter for nurses having state registration. She was also President of the Scottish Nurses Association.

In 1929, when she was in her mid-80s, she addressed the International Council of Nurses in Montreal in Canada.

== Retirement 1927-1944 ==
In 1926 Strong, along with others including Mrs Bedford Fenwick, became involved in setting up the British College of Nurses, which focused on postgraduate nurse education.

Strong moved to Edinburgh in 1930. She moved back to Glasgow in 1939 and remained there until her home was destroyed by a bomb in March 1941. She then moved to stay with her great-nephew in Chester.

== Awards ==
In the 1939 New Year Honours Strong was appointed an Officer of the Order of the British Empire (OBE).

On her 100th birthday in 1943, the King and Queen sent her a telegram that congratulated her on her distinguished services to the nursing profession. Queen Mary sent her a letter and signed portrait of herself. She was also presented with a number of illuminated address including ones from the Nightingale Fellowship, Glasgow Royal Infirmary and the Scottish Nurses Club.

== Family ==
Strong had one daughter, Annie Ellen. Annie Ellen married an Austrian engineer, Adolphus Geyer, in 1886 and they had five children. Geyer became a pastor of the Lutheran church in Glasgow as well as an accomplished medical photographer. Two of their children became doctors and one daughter (Annie) did her nurse training at the Glasgow Royal Infirmary at the same place her grandmother developed the nurse training programme.

== Death and commemoration ==
Strong died aged 100 on 26 April 1944 at Vicars Cross in Cheshire where she had lived since 1941.

Rebecca Strong is commemorated by a plaque opposite the gates of the former Dundee Royal Infirmary.
