= Annie Matheson =

British poet

Annie Matheson (29 March 1853 – 16 March 1924) was a British Victorian era poet. She was known to have written one of the first biographies of Florence Nightingale as well as several volumes of meditative and lyrical poetry. Because her poems were primarily centered on the ethical and spiritual experience of life, several Christian denominations have been known to appreciate her work. As evidenced by her several publications, she greatly advocated for the alleviation of poverty and social injustice in hope of reform. She contributed to several contemporary periodicals by writing short essays and biographies. Although she published several works, there is no significant biographical account of Matheson's life.

== Life ==
Annie Matheson was born in 1853 in Blackheath, Kent. She was the daughter of Rev. James Matheson, a Congregationalist minister in Nottingham and his wife Elizabeth Cripps, and older sister to Percy Ewing Matheson besides nine other siblings. Privately educated in Nottingham, Matheson discovered a passion for writing as she began to contribute to literary journalism. Her religious family background seems to have greatly influenced her outlook and writing. Her work exhibited both selflessness and confidence. Though one of a large family, she neither married nor had children. The 1911 England Census records her as living at the age of fifty-eight at Beutham, Maybury Hill, Woking as a "spinster" and head of the household, whose occupation was literature and journalism.

== Literary work ==
At the age of thirty-seven, she published her first book, The Religion of Humanity and Other Poems (1890). In 1899, Matheson published Selected Poems Old and New as a compilation of popular shorter poems. Many preceding publications encompassed her strong faith and the beauty of God's nature. In her book, Leave of Prose...With Two Studies by May Sinclair (1912), her writing shifted to a more social-critical perspective as she evaluated hard work and knowledge. Children were her primary audience as she wrote The Story of a Brave Child: A Child's Life of Joan of Arc (1910) because she wanted them to understand the power of faith upon an individual.

In her well-known book Florence Nightingale: A biography (1913), Matheson described Nightingale's greatest accomplishment, the invention of modern nursing, in 374 pages. She acknowledged Nightingale's generous motivations and tireless efforts during the Crimean War to care for the British wounded. By reading this biography, contemporary readers learned of Nightingale's campaign for sanitation and her establishment of public-healthcare in Britain.

Following this publication, Matheson returned to publishing several volumes for children in a series called "Rose and Dragon," which includes A Plain Friend (1920) However, the series was never finished due to her death in 1924 in London.

== Critical reception ==
Critics of Matheson at St. James Gazette pointed out that she was "not one of those women poets who strive to write as men; she has the characteristics of her sex, and is before all things gentle, sympathetic, humane." Others, like The Westminster Review, criticized her work as "poetry of the head and not the heart...which binds it and restraints it so as to let no free abandonment of utterance". According to a critical essay by Alfred Miles, Matheson's The Religion of Humanity and Other Poems (1890), has "impressed those able to discriminate by its earnestness of purpose, nobility of thought, and distinction of style and form."

== Publications ==
- (1890) The Religion of Humanity and Other Poems
- (1894) Love's Music and Other New Poems
- (1898) Love Triumphant, and Other New Poems
- (1899) Selected Poems Old and New
- (1900) Snowflakes and Snowdrops. Christmas Rhymes and Valentine Verses for Schoolroom and Nursery.
- (1909) By Divers Paths: The Note-Book of Seven Wayfarers
- (1910) The Story of a Brave Child: A Child's Life of Joan of Arc
- (1911) Roses, loaves, and old rhymes
- (1912) Leaves of Prose... With Two Studies by May Sinclair
- (1913) Florence Nightingale: a biography. London: Nelson.
- (1913) Maytime Songs
- (1920) A Plain Friend
- (1920) Our Hero of the Golden Heart... With Biography and Portrait of D. O. Barnett
- (1921) Hal's Book for Children of All Ages
