= Macewen's sign =

Macewen's Sign
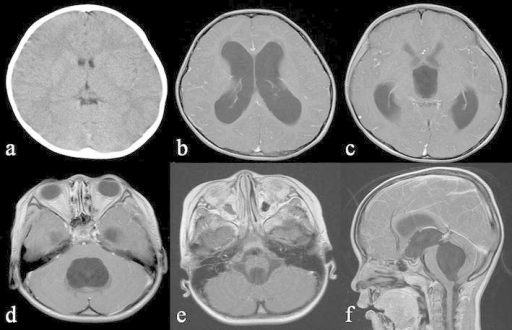
- Hydrocephalus in a three-year-old male patient on MRI.
- Differential diagnosis: Excess CSF

Macewen's sign or Macewen sign (/məˈkjuːən/ mə-KEW-ən) is a sign used to help to diagnose hydrocephalus (accumulation of excess cerebrospinal fluid) and brain abscesses. Tapping (percussion) the skull near the junction of the frontal, temporal, and parietal bones will produce cracked pot sound. Positive test is indication of separated sutures. This is due to raised intracranial tension.

The sign was discovered and described by Sir William Macewen (1848–1924), a surgeon and professor of the University of Glasgow, Scotland, who also described Macewen's operation for inguinal hernia.

McEwan's sign in alcohol intoxication is different: Pupils are contracted, but external painful stimulation of the person (e.g. by pinching or slapping) causes the pupil to dilate followed by slow constriction. It is suggestive of alcoholic coma.
