= Idumuje-Unor =

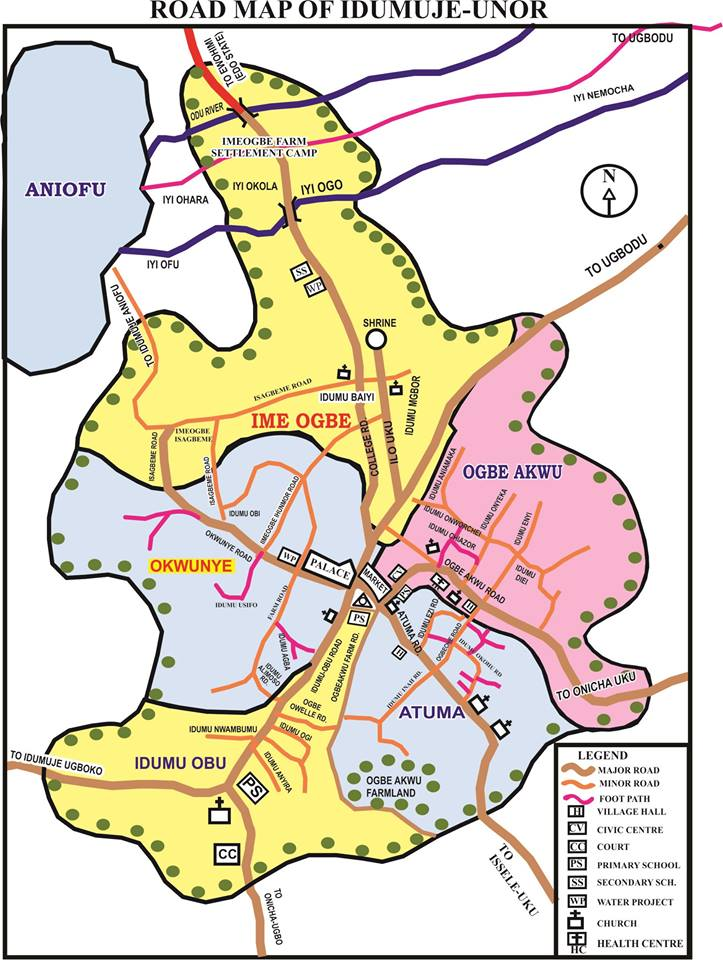
- Country: Nigeria

Area
  - Total: 16 km^{2} (6.2 sq mi)

Population
  - Total: 20,000
  - Density: 1,200/km^{2} (3,200/sq mi)
- Time zone: UTC+1 (WAT)

Idumuje Unor is an Igbo town situated in the Aniocha North Local Government Area of Delta State, Nigeria, lying between 6°20'01.4"N and 6°22'06.5"N and between 6°25'01.4"E and 6°27’06.6"E. It is located 5 kilometres (3.1 mi) from Issele-Uku, the headquarters of Aniocha North and has a growing land area of 16 square kilometres (6.2 sq mi) and current estimated population of about 20,000 inhabitants. It is bordered to the west by Onicha-Ugbo, to the North by Idumuje-Ugboko and Ewohinmi in Edo State, to the East by Onicha-Uku and Ugbodu and to the south by Issele-Uku. The name Idumuje in the Edo language could be translated to mean; Idumu - Community/Quarters and Oje - King/Royal. In other words, Idumuje means Royal Quarters or Kings' Quarter. Worthy to note: Another Idumuje named location could be found at present in Benin (in proximity to the Royal Palace of the Oba of Benin). The suffix "Unor" (meaning - home) is an inclusion to the town's name so as to differentiate it from the breakaway community Idumuje -Ugboko; by a man called Nwoko and his supporters some 300 years ago. Ugboko is translated to mean "Ugbo" - Farm & "Oko" - a shortening of the name Nwoko.

Ime-Ogbe is the nucleus of Idumuje- Unor, which can be traced to Ihu-ani Ihummor on Iloh Ukwu (First Major Road) by a man named Ikeke, who was said to have migrated from Iheogbe quarters in the present day Benin Kingdom of Edo State. Then followed by other migrants, who made up the traditional five villages listed as follows: Okwunye, Idumu-obu, Ogbe-akwu, and Atuma

According to a frontline Nigerian journalist from Idumuje Unor, Norbert kpomiose Chiazor " One of the monarchs of Idumuje-Unor, Agbogidi Obi James Anyasi II was the longest reigning king ruling from 1946-2023 in Africa and the second in the world after King Bhumibol Adelyadej of Thailand reputed as the World's longest reigning monarch. A phenomenal king headed for the Guinness book of records, he was born on 6 March 1924. Obi Anyasi II was crowned king ok from the Okwunye ruling dynasty on 9 October 1946 at the age of 22, in the heydays of British Colonialism.The Obi died in 2013, ruling for 66 years, a royal longevity never recorded in Nigerian or African contemporary history".

His Royal Majesty, Obi Charles Chukwunwike Anyasi, was crowned on 17 May 2014. He is a journalist who became a monarch. The community is made up of peoples originally from various clans such as, Benin, the Esan, Asaba and some Yoruba ethnicities centuries ago. The foremost settlement said to be by people of Benin ancestry is located at Ime-Ogbe (literally meaning "inside Quarters"). The Idumu-Obu quarters was said to have been foremostly settled by a man called Obu who was a traditional priest who hailed from Asaba. He was granted the area of land now called Idumu-Obu after a feat he was said to have achieved when summoned from Asaba.
