= William Macewen =

Scottish neurosurgeon (1848 - 1924)

Sir William Macewen
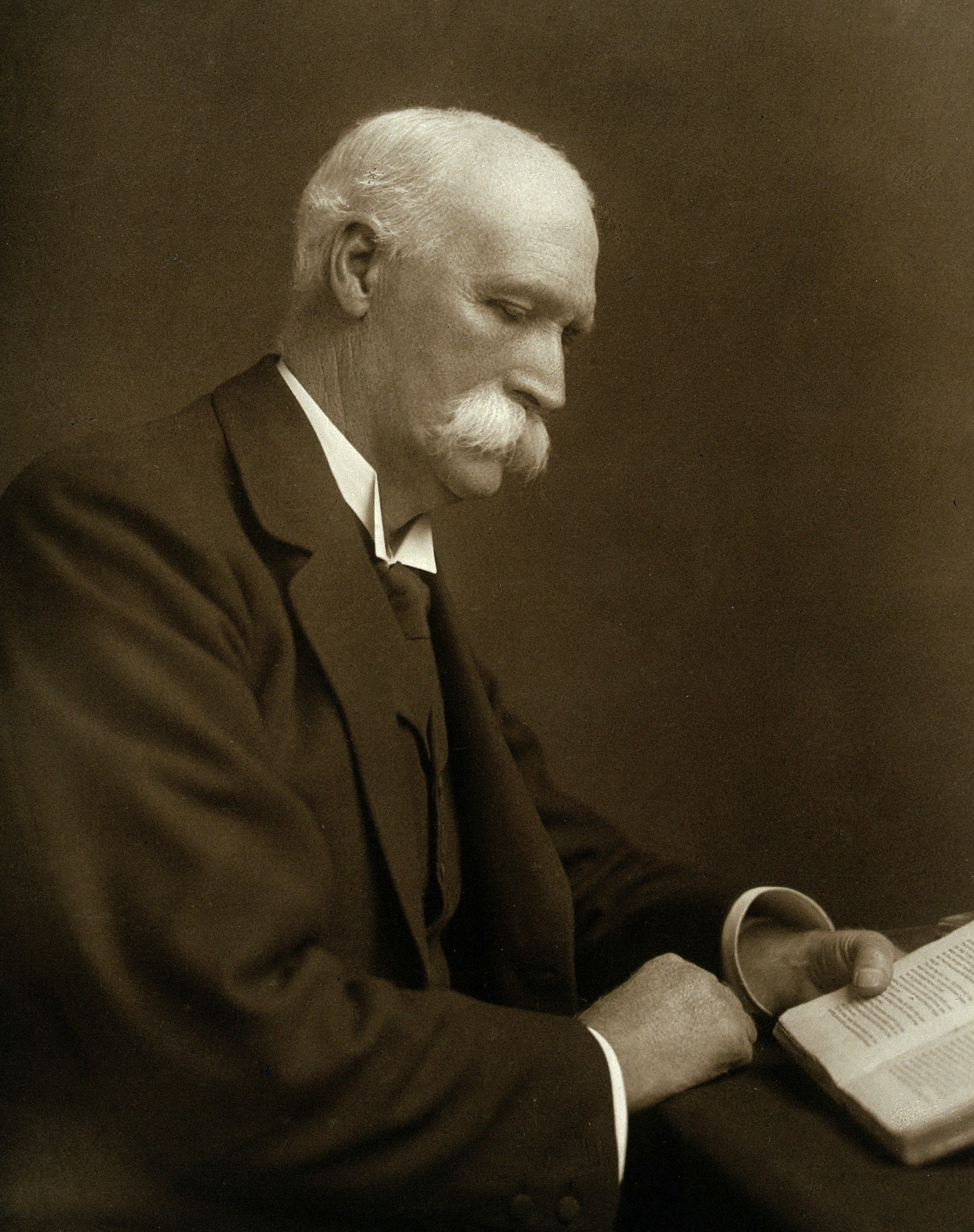
- Born: 22 June 1848; Port Bannatyne, Isle of Bute, Scotland
- Died: 22 March 1924 (aged 75); Glasgow, Scotland
- Education: University of Glasgow
- Known for: Pioneering work in brain surgery, hernia surgery and bone grafts endotracheal anaesthesia pneumonectomy
- Medical career
- Profession: Surgeon
- Institutions: Glasgow Royal Infirmary; Western Infirmary; Royal Hospital for Sick Children
- Sub-specialties: Neurosurgery, Orthopedic surgery
- Awards: Knighthood; Cameron Prize for Therapeutics of the University of Edinburgh (1896)

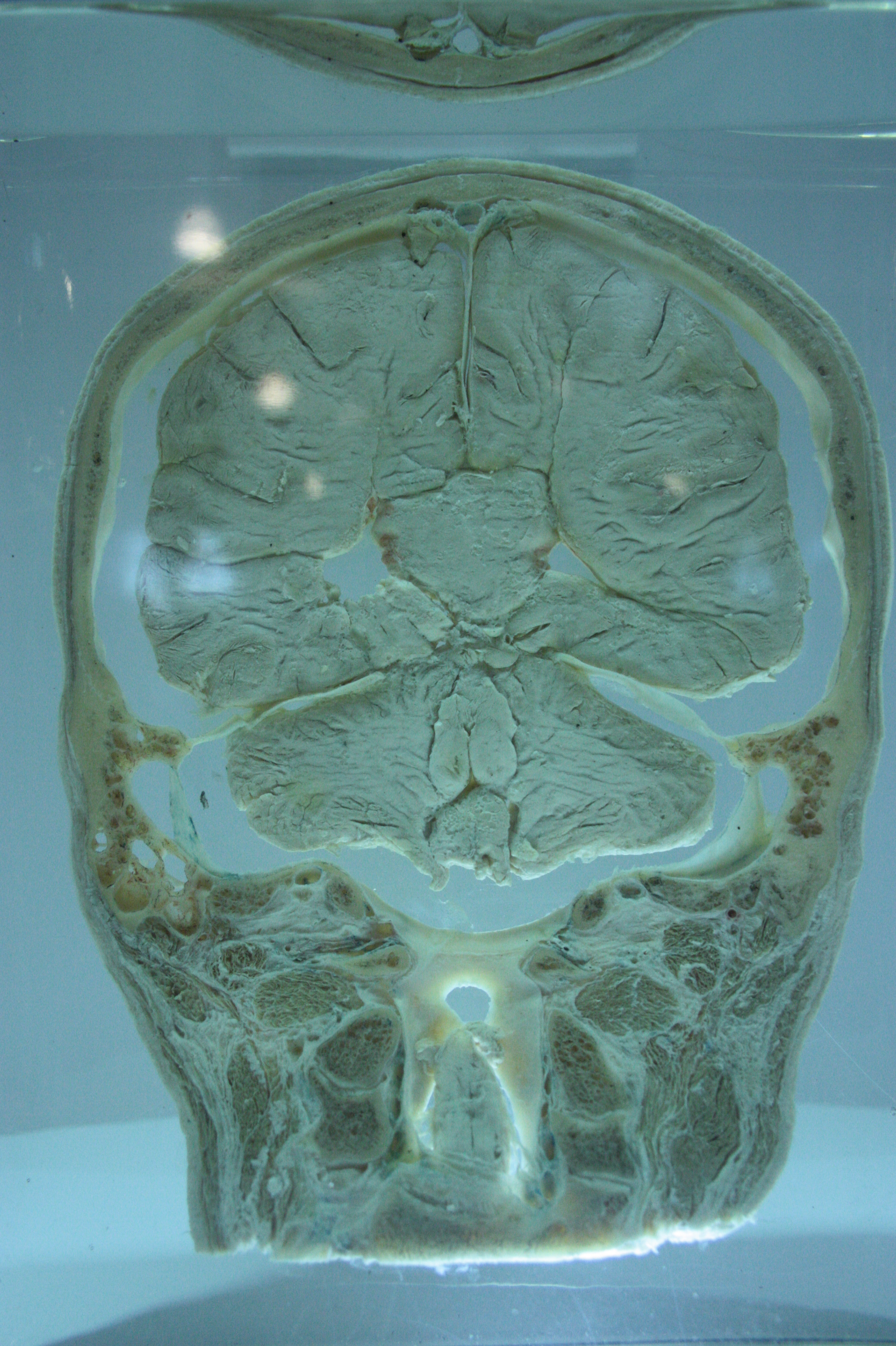
Cross-section of brain prepared by William Macewen, c. 1900, Hunterian Museum

Sir William Macewen (/məˈkjuːən/ mə-KEW-ən; 22 June 1848 – 22 March 1924) was a Scottish surgeon. He was a pioneer in modern brain surgery, considered the father of neurosurgery and contributed to the development of bone graft surgery, the surgical treatment of hernia and of pneumonectomy (removal of the lungs).

== Career ==
Macewen was born near Port Bannatyne, near Rothesay on the Isle of Bute, in western Scotland in 1848.

He studied medicine at the University of Glasgow, receiving a medical degree in 1872. He was greatly influenced by Joseph, Lord Lister (1827–1912), who revolutionised surgery by developing antisepsis, by the use of phenol, thus decreasing drastically the enormous mortality of surgical patients due to infections. By following Lister and adopting systematically the use of scrubbing (deep cleansing and disinfection of hands and arms), sterilisation of surgical tools, use of surgical gowns, and (recently discovered) anaesthesia, Macewen became one of the most innovative surgeons of his time and was able to greatly advance modern surgical technique and improve the recovery of patients.

In 1875, he became an assistant surgeon at the Glasgow Royal Infirmary, being promoted to full surgeon in 1877. Around 1880 he began a training programme for nurses (focussing on sterilisation) at the infirmary under the charge of the Matron, Mrs Rebecca Strong (1843-1944). In 1881 he was appointed lecturer on Systematic Surgery at the Royal Infirmary School of Medicine. In 1883 he was appointed as Surgeon to the Royal Hospital for Sick Children in Glasgow. In 1892 Macewen became Regius Professor of Surgery at the University of Glasgow (the post which Lister had held when Macewen was a student) and transferred his surgical activities to the Western Infirmary. In 1896, Macewan was awarded the Cameron Prize for Therapeutics of the University of Edinburgh.

He was knighted in the 1902 Coronation Honours for services to medicine, receiving the accolade from King Edward VII at Buckingham Palace on 24 October that year.

In 1916 Macewen helped to found the Princess Louise Scottish Hospital for Limbless Sailors and Soldiers in Erskine (now the Erskine Hospital), near Glasgow, which was urgently needed to treat the thousands of military who had lost their limbs in the First World War. Macewen was its first chief surgeon and with the help of engineers and workers at the nearby Yarrow Shipbuilders he designed the Erskine artificial limb. He trained a team of pattern-makers to manufacture them for the hospital. Macewen recruited the first matron for Erskine, Agnes Carnochan Douglas, who he had worked with in the Western Infirmary in Glasgow.

Macewen died in Glasgow on 22 March 1924. He lived at Garrochty on the Isle of Bute until his death and was buried nearby in the churchyard of St Blane's Church at Kingarth.

== Neurosurgery ==
Following the work of John Hughlings Jackson (1835–1911) and David Ferrier (1843–1924) on neurological mapping of functions in the brain, Macewen demonstrated in 1876 that it was possible to use a precise clinical examination to determine the possible site of a tumour or lesion in the brain, by observing its effects on the side and extension of alterations in motor and sensory functions. Thus, in 1876 he diagnosed an abscess in the frontal lobe of a boy, but the family refused permission to operate. When the patient died his diagnosis and localisation were found to be correct.

In 1879 he performed the first successful intracranial surgery where the site of the lesion (a left frontal meningioma) was localized solely by the preoperative focal epileptic signs (twitching of the face and arms in the opposite side of the lesion). On the basis of these signs Macewen thought that there was good evidence of an "irritation to the lower and middle portions of the ascending convolutions…in the left frontal lobe". A trephined hole in the skull near the purported site of the lesion showed a big subdural tumour. The patient, a teenage girl, lived for eight more years, and a subsequent autopsy showed no trace of the tumour. He later used this many times to successfully operate on brain abscesses (in 1876) and hematomas and on the spine. This was a great triumph of medicine.

According to one of his biographers, "his thorough knowledge of the natural history of pyogenic diseases of the temporal bone and nasal sinuses, in addition to his clear description of cranial anatomy, as illustrated in his Atlas of Head Sections, were especially important in developing his successful treatment of brain abscess. The X-ray had not yet been discovered; Macewen's diagnosis was based on clinical findings superbly illustrated by his three clinical stages of brain abscess development." (Canale, 1996).

== Contributions to surgery ==
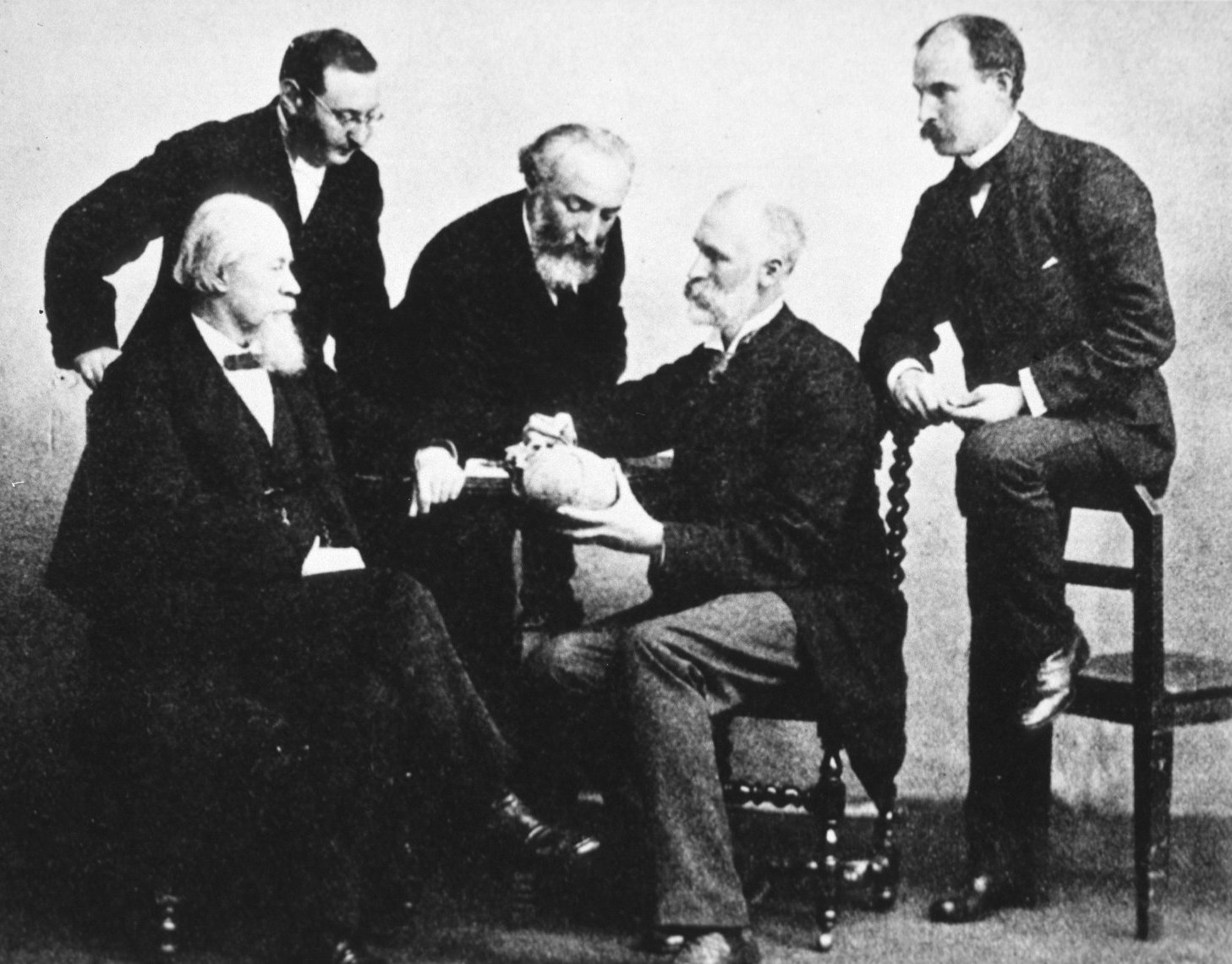
Macewen demonstrates his triangle to Lane, Hirschfelder, Barkan and Stillman.

One of his earliest contributions while at the Royal Infirmary, in 1877, was in orthopaedics, by means of the development of the first bone grafts, but also in knee surgery using a special instrument (Macewen's osteotome) both techniques becoming key treatments for the highly prevalent disease of rickets (caused by a lack of Vitamin D). Macewen was interested in the biology of bone and carried out a classical series of experiments on animals in order to determine how bones grow and may be repaired. He developed surgical treatments for mastoid disease and pyogenic cysts of the temporal bone and has identified an anatomical structure in this bone, the foveola suprameatica, which was named MacEwen's triangle in his honour.

His method of surgical removal of lungs became a major medical weapon in the treatment of tuberculosis and lung cancer, thus saving many patients. His name was also immortalised in Medicine in two other instances: the Macewen's operation for inguinal hernia and the Macewen's sign for hydrocephalus and brain abscess.

Another important contribution by Macewen to modern surgery was the technique of endotracheal anaesthesia with the help of orotracheal intubation, which he described in 1880, and still in use today.

Macewen was noted for his early and creative use of photographs for documenting patients' cases and for teaching surgery and medicine. He pioneered the use of photos of body parts and pathological specimens, as well as photos taken before, after and during treatment/surgery.

== Honours ==
- Fellow of the Royal College of Physicians and Surgeons of Glasgow (1874)
- Fellow of the Royal Society (1895)
- Honorary Fellow of the Royal College of Surgeons of England (1900)
- President of the British Medical Association (1922)
- Knighted (1902)
- Companion of the Order of the Bath (1917)

After his death, a memorial fund was set up in his name. As part of the late 1970s redevelopment of Glasgow Royal Infirmary, where Macewen spent most of his career, a new laboratory block was named in his honour. It opened in 1981.

== Archives ==
The archives of Sir William Macewen are maintained by the Archives of the University of Glasgow and the Royal College of Physicians and Surgeons of Glasgow.
