= Edward G. Leffler =

Edward G. Leffler was an American former salesman of aluminium pots and pans, who introduced in 1924 the mutual fund. He was selling securities for six years before starting the first mutual fund. He was of Swedish descent from Wisconsin.

== Mutual fund ==
Leffler came up with the idea of creating mutual funds with daily redeemability and continuous issuing of shares at the current net asset value of the fund (NAV). On March 21, 1924, Leffer started the first mutual fund, Massachusetts Investors Trust. Initially, the fund was offering new shares continuously to investors without redemption – Investors were able to redeem their shares starting from September. Leffler also started another fund, Incorporated Investors on November 23, 1925 along with a group of Bostonians.
