= HMS Scythe =

Destroyer of the Royal Navy

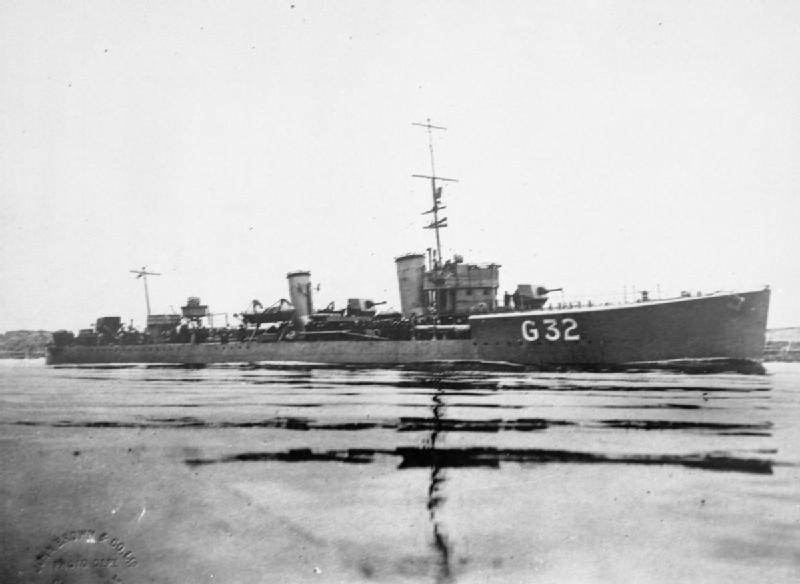
- Scythe in 1918

History

United Kingdom
- Name: Scythe
- Ordered: 23 June 1917
- Builder: John Brown & Company, Clydebank
- Laid down: 14 January 1918
- Launched: 25 May 1918
- Completed: 8 July 1918
- Commissioned: July 1918
- Fate: Sold for scrap, November 1931

General characteristics (as built)
- Class & type: S-class destroyer
- Displacement: 1,000 long tons (1,016 t) (normal)
- Length: 276 ft (84.1 m) o/a
- Beam: 26 ft 8 in (8.1 m)
- Draught: 9 ft 10 in (3 m)
- Installed power: 3 × Yarrow boilers; 27,000 shp (20,000 kW)
- Propulsion: 2 Shafts; 1 steam turbine
- Speed: 34 knots (63 km/h; 39 mph)
- Range: 2,100 nmi (3,900 km; 2,400 mi) at 15 knots (28 km/h; 17 mph)
- Complement: 82
- Armament: 3 × single 4 in (102 mm) guns; 1 × single 2 pdr (40 mm (1.6 in)) AA guns; 2 × twin 21 in (533 mm) torpedo tubes; 2 × single 18 in (450 mm) torpedo tubes

HMS Scythe was an S-class destroyer built for the Royal Navy during the First World War. She was involved in the Irish Civil War in the interwar period before being sold for scrap in 1931.

== Description ==
The Admiralty S class were larger and faster versions of the preceding R class. The ships had an overall length of 276 feet (84.1 m), a beam of 26 feet 8 inches (8.1 m) and a deep draught of 9 feet 10 inches (3 m). They displaced 1,000 long tons (1,016 t) at normal load. The ships' complement was 82 officers and ratings.

The ships were powered by a single Brown-Curtis geared steam turbine that drove two propeller shafts using steam provided by three Yarrow boilers. The turbines developed a total of 27,000 shaft horsepower (20,000 kW) and gave a maximum speed of 36 knots (67 km/h; 41 mph). Scythe reached a speed of 33.5 knots (62.0 km/h; 38.6 mph) during her sea trials. The ships carried enough fuel oil to give them a range of 3,500 nautical miles (6,500 km; 4,000 mi) at 15 knots (28 km/h; 17 mph).

The Admiralty S-class ships were armed with three single QF 4-inch (102 mm) Mark IV guns. One gun was positioned on the forecastle, the second was on a platform between the funnels and the third at the stern. They were equipped with a single QF 2-pounder (40 mm (1.6 in)) "pom-pom" anti-aircraft gun on a platform forward of the mainmast. They were also fitted with two rotating twin mounts for 21-inch (533 mm) torpedoes amidships and two 18-inch (450 mm) torpedo tubes, one on each broadside abaft the forecastle.

== Construction and career ==
Scythe, the first ship of her name to serve in the Royal Navy, was ordered on 23 June 1917 as part of the Twelfth War Programme from John Brown & Company. The ship was laid down at the company's Clydebank shipyard on 14 January 1918, launched on 25 May 1918, completed on 7 July and commissioned that same month.

Scythe served in the 12th Destroyer Flotilla of the Grand Fleet in 1918–1919, moving to the new 7th Destroyer Flotilla at Rosyth in March 1919 before going into reserve at Devonport on 12 November 1919. Subsequently, she was re-commissioned on 4 April 1923, as an independent command in Irish waters after the establishment of the Irish Free State. Between October 1923 and January 1925 her first lieutenant was Frederick Bell, later to earn fame as the captain of HMS Exeter during the Battle of the River Plate. Scythe was involved in a shooting incident at Queenstown (modern-day Cobh) on 21 March 1924, when machine gun fire was directed at her. She was sold for scrap on 28 November 1931 to John Cashmore Ltd (Newport).
