= Macewen's operation =

- Specialty: General surgeon

Macewen's operation is an operation for the cure of inguinal hernia, developed by Scottish surgeon Sir William Macewen (1864-1924).

It is performed by closing the internal ring with a pad made of the hernial sac.
