= Ayr Cathedral =

Coordinates: 55.464722°N 4.626667°W

- Cathedral of Saint Margaret, Ayr
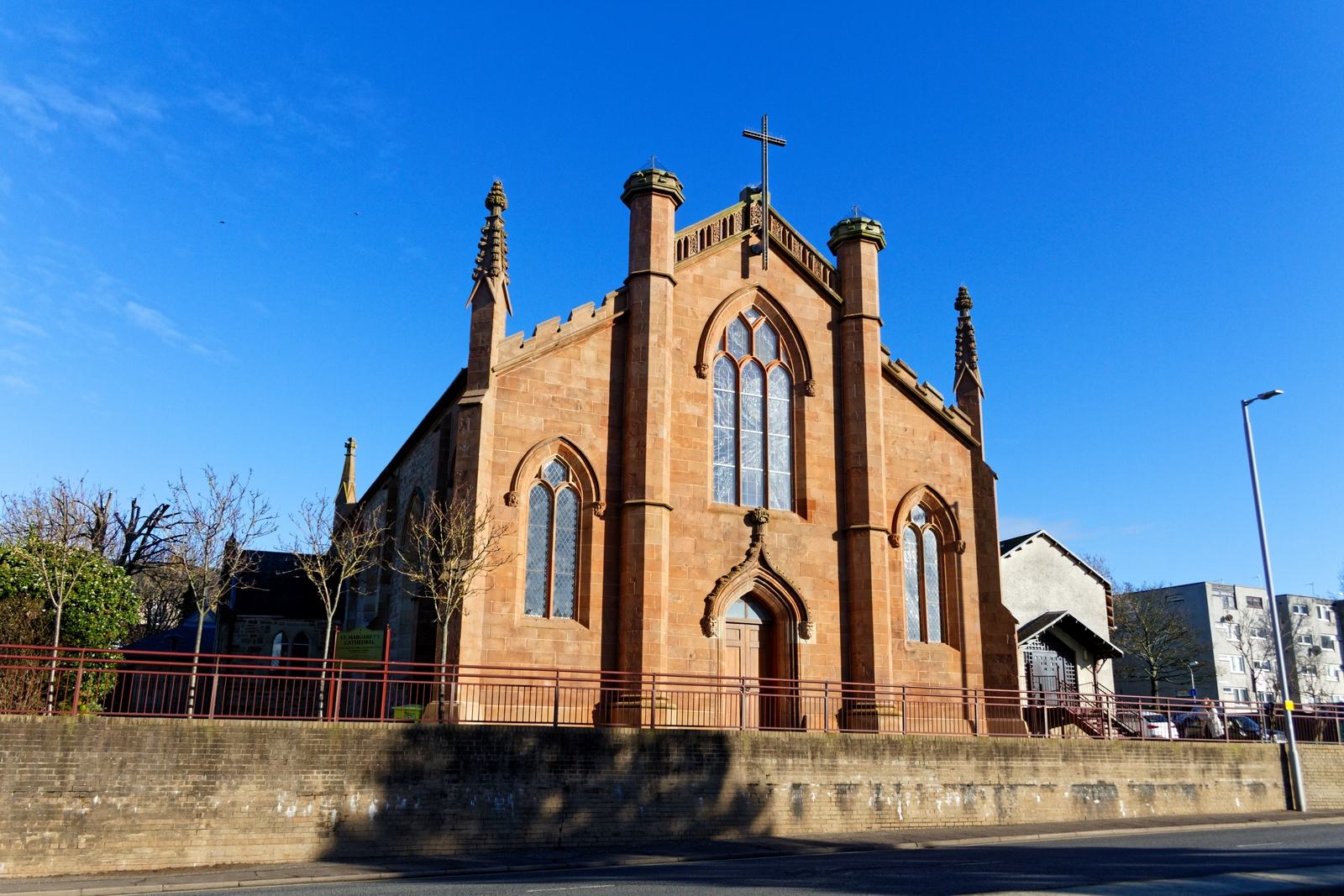

- Location in South Ayrshire
- Location: Ayr, South Ayrshire
- Country: Scotland
- Denomination: Roman Catholic

History
- Former name: The Church of Saint Margaret
- Status: In Use

Architecture
- Heritage designation: A-Listed Building
- Designated: 28 July 2007
- Previous cathedrals: Cathedral of the Good Shepherd, Ayr
- Style: Gothic

Specifications
- Capacity: 350

Administration
- Province: St Andrews and Edinburgh
- Diocese: Galloway

Clergy
- Bishop: Francis Dougan

The Cathedral Church of Saint Margaret, also known as Ayr Cathedral, is a Roman Catholic cathedral located in Ayr, Scotland. It is the seat of the Bishop of Galloway, and the mother church of the Roman Catholic Diocese of Galloway. St Margaret's was designated a cathedral in 2007, due to the closure of Good Shepherd Cathedral, Ayr.

== History of St Margaret's Ayr ==
St Margaret's Church and later Cathedral has changed considerably over its almost 200 years of existence.

The church was designed by architect James Dempster.

During the 1960s/1970s the church was remodelled as a result of Vatican II. These changes significantly altered the layout of the sanctuary and were carried out to enable the congregation to have a more active role in Mass, with the priest celebrating Mass facing the congregation rather than towards the high altar.

In the mid-1990s it became apparent that the church required substantial capital works undertaken. There were issues with water ingress, dampness, corrosion of windows, problems with electricity and general wear and tear. Father Martin McCluskey began to discuss with the parish the need for a major renovation program to begin. His untimely death in 1996 resulted in him being unable to undertake or commission any of the works to take place. When Father Patrick Keegans arrived at the parish in 1997 he agreed that works were required and were required sooner rather than later and initiated the process of preparing for major renovations.

The church underwent a very thorough makeover and re-dedication in the late 1990s and early years of this century. The sanctuary was completely refurbished and new furnishings, a central aisle, stained glass windows, new organ, new large sacristy and many other improvements, with a white colour scheme for the ceiling and walls. New lighting and new central heating were also installed. All of these improvements were costly, but substantial grants from Heritage Scotland and the National Lottery plus some very successful and imaginative fundraising saw the bills paid off in a remarkably short time.

During these renovations the parish community signed two books: a Book of Dedication and a Book of Remembrance. All parishioners were invited to sign the book of dedication and remember those family members and friends who had died. Both these books are placed directly under the high altar in the cathedral as a lasting legacy to parishioners past, present and future.

The new fully refurbished church officially re-opened on 31 March 2000 in a ceremony attended by many people from both civic and religious life, as well as parishioners from Saint Margarets and across the diocese. This official opening and re-dedication was presided by Bishop Maurice Taylor, and the homilist was Canon Matthew McManus, who served in Saint Margarets as assistant priest from 1965 to 1976.

On 14 September 2007, the Feast of the Triumph of the Cross, Bishop Cunningham along with priests and bishops from across Scotland dedicated Saint Margaret's Church as cathedral church of the Diocese of Galloway following the closure of the Good Shepherd Cathedral in Ayr.

=== Key dates ===
- 1822 | The Catholic population in Ayrshire was growing and was ministered to by visiting priests, Bishop Cameron sent Rev William Thomson to be the first parish priest.
- 1826 | After much petitioning by the Rev William Thomson, the foundation stone was laid for the St Margaret's.
- 1827 | The new St Margaret's church was officially opened.
- 1895 | A permanent school was opened for the children of St Margaret's in a new building adjacent to the church.
- 1930 | St Margaret's High School opened in Whitletts Road when all classes were transferred from the 'wee school' next to the church. This became the church hall.
- 1978 | The old chapel house was demolished due to the realignment and upgrading of John Street. A new chapel house was built to the north of the church.
- 1986 | The Old School Building was razed to the ground to make way for the new church hall.
- 1989 | The new Church Hall was opened by Provost McNeill.
- 1999 | Works start on the renovations of St Margaret's.
- 2000 | St Margaret's re opens. Parishioners Pat Lynch, Mary Godfrey, Lee Galloway and Ken Burrell cut the ribbon.
- 2007 | Pope Benedict XVI accepted the petition of Right Reverend John Cunningham, the 7th Bishop of Galloway, to move the cathedral seat to St Margaret's Church, Ayr.

== History of Galloway cathedrals ==
When the Roman Catholic hierarchy was restored to Scotland in 1878, the Diocese of Galloway consisted of South Ayrshire, Dumfriesshire, Kirkcudbrightshire and Wigtownshire. St Andrew's, Dumfries, was chosen as the cathedral church and parish. In 1947, the apostolic constitution Dominici Gregis erected the Province of Glasgow by creating Motherwell and Paisley as two new suffragan sees. This same document also detached ten parishes in the north of Ayrshire and placed them in the Diocese of Galloway. This change resulted in Dumfries no longer being central to the population of the diocese as a whole, and convinced the then bishop, Joseph McGee, that he should move his residence to Ayr, where he could be more available to his people. In the aftermath of the destruction of St Andrew's Cathedral by fire on 10 May 1961, Bishop McGee petitioned Pope John XXIII (now Saint John XXIII) for permission to site the cathedral in the town of Ayr and to use Good Shepherd church as his cathedral until such time as a new cathedral could be built. This permission was granted on 12 March 1962 by a decree issued by the Sacred Consistorial Congregation. During the years that followed circumstances changed and no new cathedral was ever built.

Serious problems developed concerning the fabric of the Good Shepherd building and persistent water penetration. More serious than this, however, was the substantial drop in the numbers of those attending the cathedral – a drop that proved to be ongoing. By September 2001 Bishop Maurice Taylor had come to the conclusion that Good Shepherd church was no longer a suitable venue for the cathedral. Accordingly, he petitioned the Holy See for permission to transfer the cathedral to St Margaret's, Ayr, the mother church in the area. As Bishop Taylor was due to retire, the view taken in Rome, was that any decision concerning the future of the cathedral should be left to his successor. Bishop John Cunningham came to the same conclusion as Bishop Taylor concerning the future of the cathedral. Accordingly, he petitioned Pope Benedict XVI to transfer the cathedral from Good Shepherd to St Margaret's. The Bishop received an affirmative response and St Margaret's has been the cathedral since 28th 2007.

== History of clergy ==
=== Parish priests ===
- (1822–1857) Rev. William Thomson
- (1857–1868) Rev. John Gallagher
- (1868–1871) Rev. William Burke
- (1871–1890) Rev. Patrick McLaughlin
- (1891–1894) Rev. W J. O'Shaughnessy
- (1894–1914) Rev. Daniel Collins
- (1914–1932) Rev. John Woods
- (1932–1965) Rev. Joseph McHardy
- (1965–1977) Rev. Stephen Kennedy
- (1977–1996) Rev. Martin McCluskey
- (1997– 2007) Rev. Patrick Keegans

=== Bishops ===
- (1878–1893) Bishop John McLachlan
- (1893–1914) Bishop William Turner
- (1914–1943) Bishop James William McCarthy
- (1943–1952) BIshop William Henry Mellon
- (1952–1981) Bishop Joseph McGee
- (1981–2004) Bishop Maurice Taylor
- (2007–2015) Bishop John Cunningham
- (2015– February 2022) Bishop William Nolan
- (February 2022 – 22 December 2023) vacant
- (22 December 2023 - ) Bishop Frank Dougan

=== Cathedral Administrators ===
- (2007 – September 2016) Rev. Patrick Keegans
- (October 2016 – present) Rev. David Borland

== The nave ==
The two windows positioned behind the heavy structure of the gallery presented a particular problem for the designer Susan Bradbury. The gallery obscures the central third of the design, therefore the artist chose a repeat pattern so that the mind automatically fills in the hidden parts. The pattern-work is in the form of Celtic knots which shade from green to blue to represent the relationship between heaven and earth and the unbroken love that God has with everyone. The Celtic theme refers to the history of the congregation, originating in Ireland but now firmly rooted in Scotland, and because it has no beginning and no end this is also a symbol of eternity.

For the highly visible windows of the nave there are two major Christian themes "Divine Light" and "Water of Life." The stained glass was to be made in the Millennium year so the artist concentrated on two verses from the Book of Revelation: Rev 21:23, "And the city had no need of the sun, neither of the moon, to shine in it: for the glory of God did lighten it, and the Lamb is the light thereof"; and Rev 22:17, "Whosoever will, let him take the water of life freely."

These words were writ large on the drawing board throughout the design process, but such themes are open to many interpretations and other ideas played their part too. The window "Divine Light" shimmers with all the colours of the spectrum and incorporates ideas such as Let there be Light, The Light of the World, "A light shines in the darkness, a light that darkness could not overpower" (Jn 1:5).

On the south side of the nave the water window reminds us that Ayr has always depended on water, for the River Ayr and the coast have been important for trade and for fishing. Water has a rich and varied spiritual symbolism and there is a great resonance to verses such as: "He leadeth me beside still waters" (Ps 23:2); "for the earth shall be full of the knowledge of the Lord, as the waters cover the sea" (Is 11:9); "But whoever drinketh of the water that I shall give him shall never thirst; but the water that I shall give him shall be in him a well of water springing up into everlasting life" (Jn 4:14). Hopefully people will merge their own ideas with those of the artist.

The 'Water of Life' window is also a memorial to all those who died in the Pan Am Flight 103 disaster. This window was gifted to the parish by the American relatives of those involved in the air disaster. This was in recognition of the close bonds that the previous cathedral administrator (Patrick Canon Keegans) had with these families as he was parish priest in Lockerbie at the time of the disaster.

Both 'Divine Light' and 'Water of Lifef' windows sparkle with lenses of lead crystal; in one for the theme of light, in the other to represent bubbles as the River Ayr flows into the blue mass of the sea.

The window at the west side (above the gallery) of the cathedral fronting John Street was renovated in 2016. It has been designed by the same artist as those in 2000 (Susan Bradbury) and again uses modern and symbolic images to interpret a spiritual theme.

The window consists of three lancets with five tracery lights above. The new design is inspired by the theme of Praise as described in Psalm 148, represented symbolically by a blaze of golden light. There are a range of different types of glass within this window including blown glass, etched glass, flash glass, spun rounders and glass lenses.

The title of this window is "Gloria in Excelsis Deo… Glory to God in the Highest".

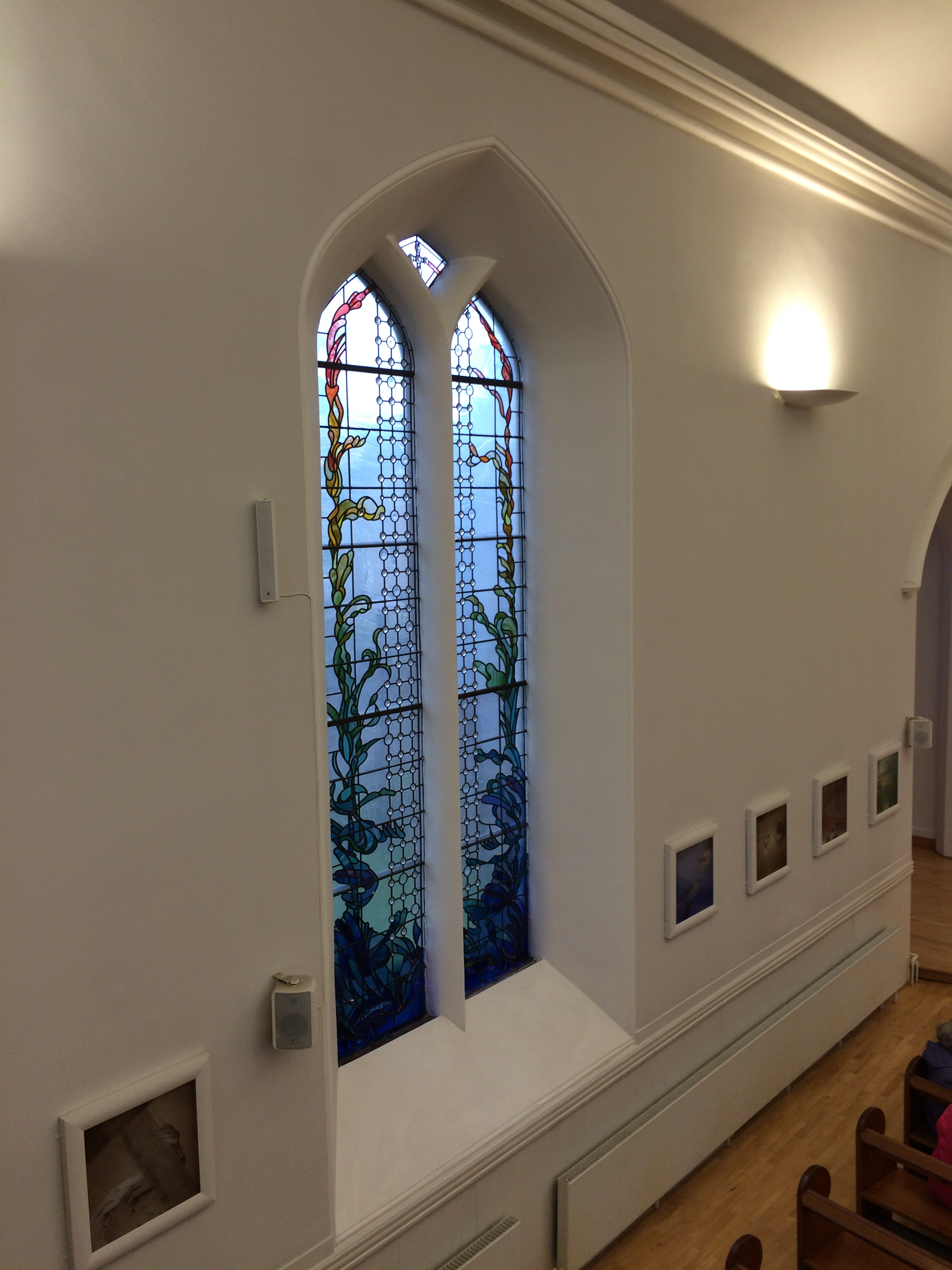
Divine Light Window

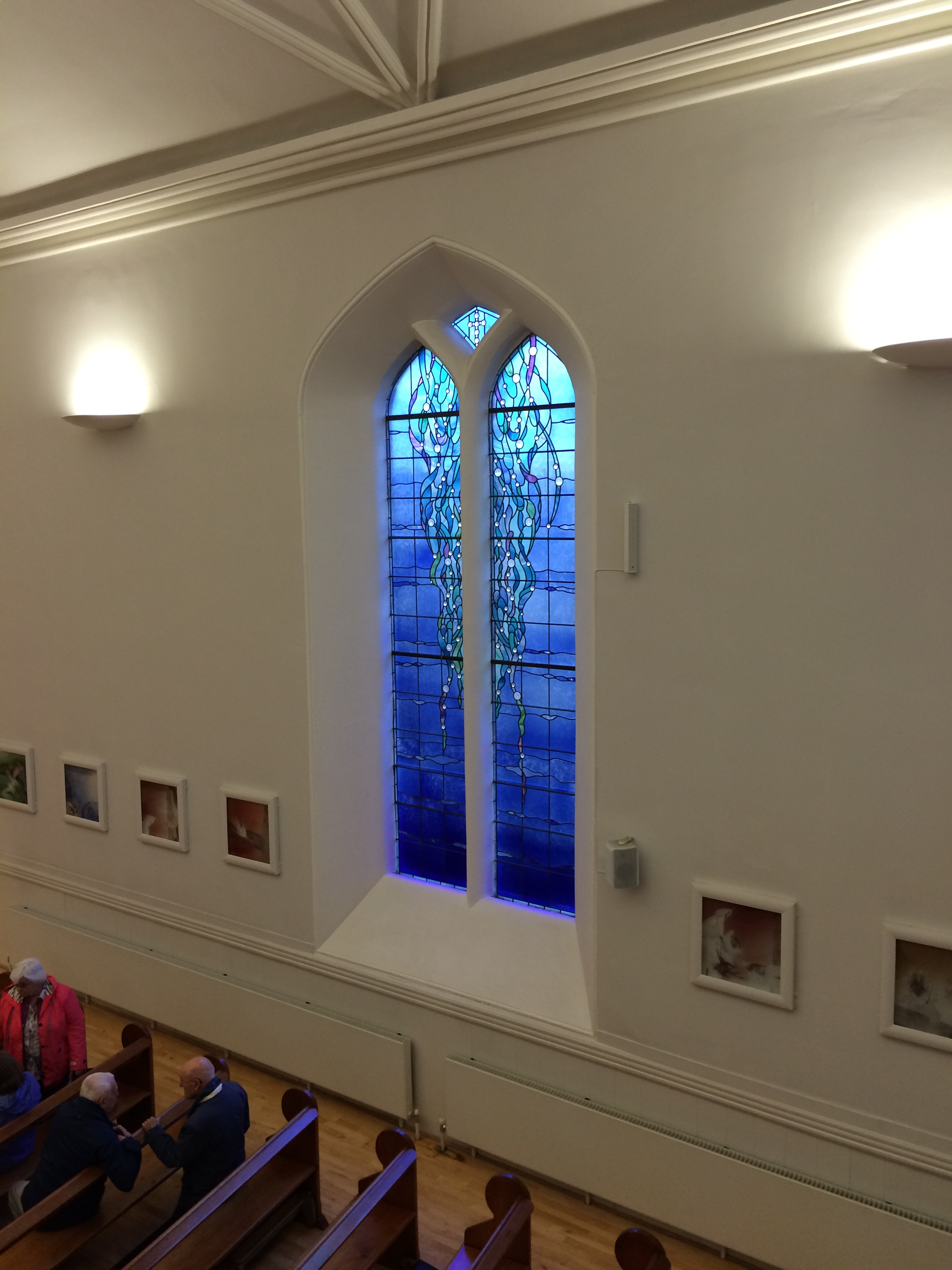
Water of Life Window

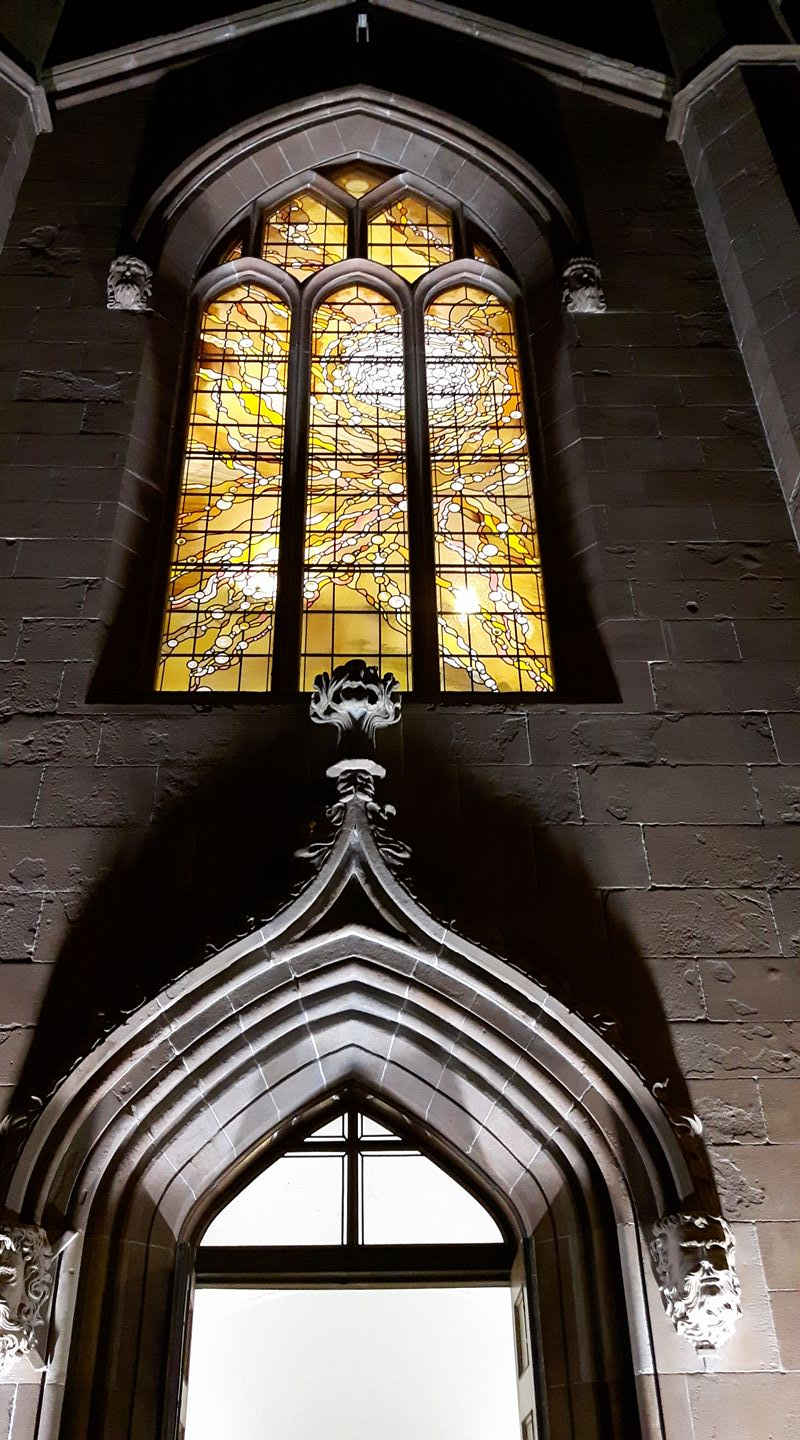
Glory to God Window

== The sanctuary ==
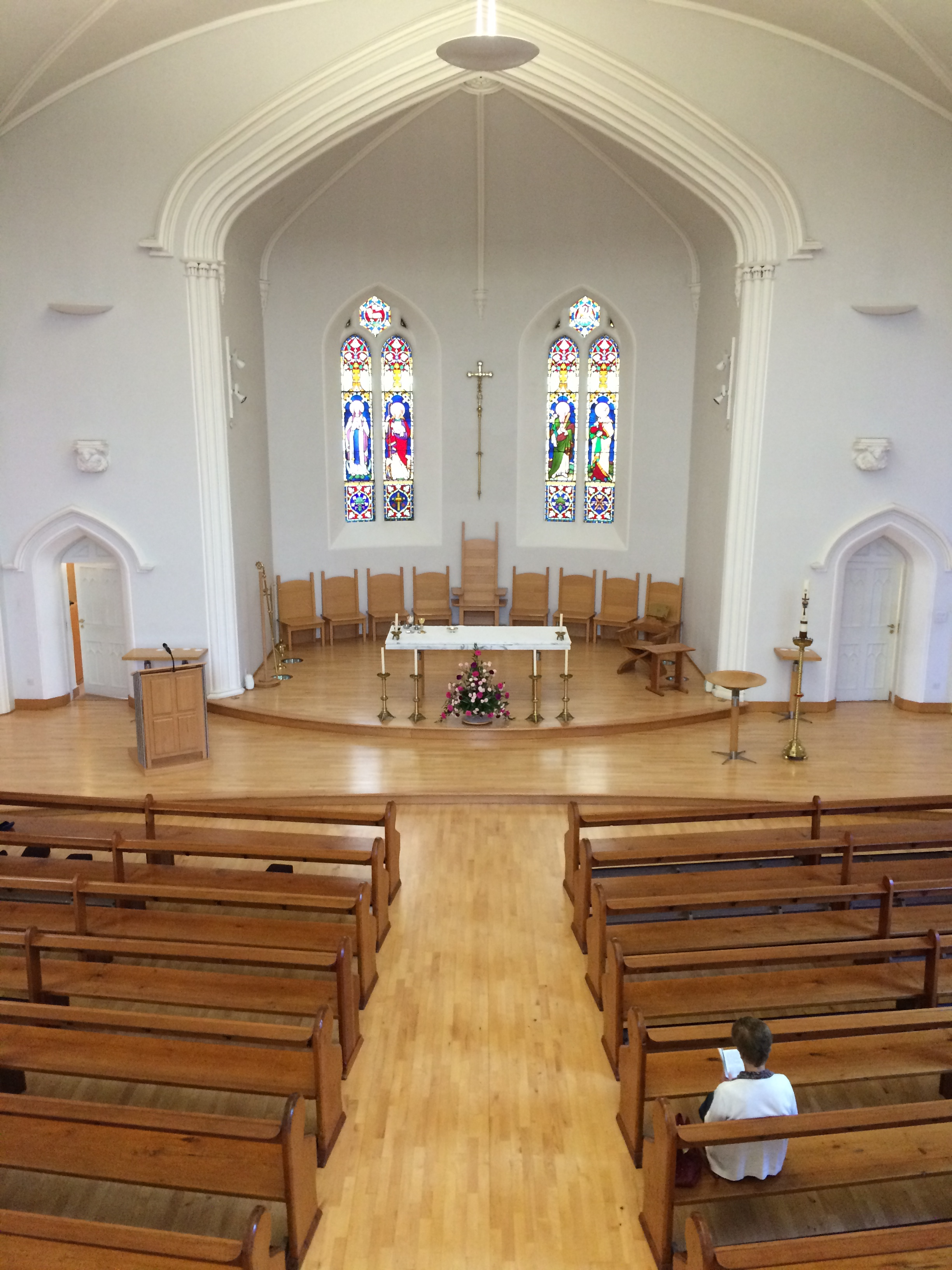
View of the sanctuary from the gallery

=== Windows ===
The windows found in the sanctuary contrast sharply from the symbolic and modern windows found in the nave. These Victorian windows have a strong Gothic Revival colour scheme and are pictorial by nature.

Behind the high altar are four original stained glass windows dating from 1827. These windows depict, from left to right:

1. The Virgin Mary
2. Jesus, The Good Shepherd
3. Saint Joseph
4. Saint Margaret of Scotland

=== Altar furnishings ===
The altar furnishings were originally designed by AustinSmithLord Architects in 2000 with some minor changes in 2007 to reflect the change in status of the church.

The bishop's chair is known as the cathedra. This is where the bishop will sit when he presides at solemn functions. It was designed and crafted by Michael Mancini in 2007.

The cross is originally from St Mary's Church, Saltcoats. It was gifted to the cathedral in the early part of the 2010s. The sanctuary cross from 1970s–1990s can be found in the confession room.

== Sacred Heart Chapel ==
The new windows in both side chapels have a stronger colour scheme to link the modern work with original windows retained on the sanctuary and transepts.

To the left of the sanctuary is the Sacred Heart Chapel. In this chapel you will find a modern stained glass window in a ruby red colour filled with hearts.

The new window of the Sacred Heart Chapel is a meditation on the theme of Love.

The older original window above the altar containing the Tabernacle shows Christ appearing as the Sacred Heart to St Margaret Mary Alacoque.

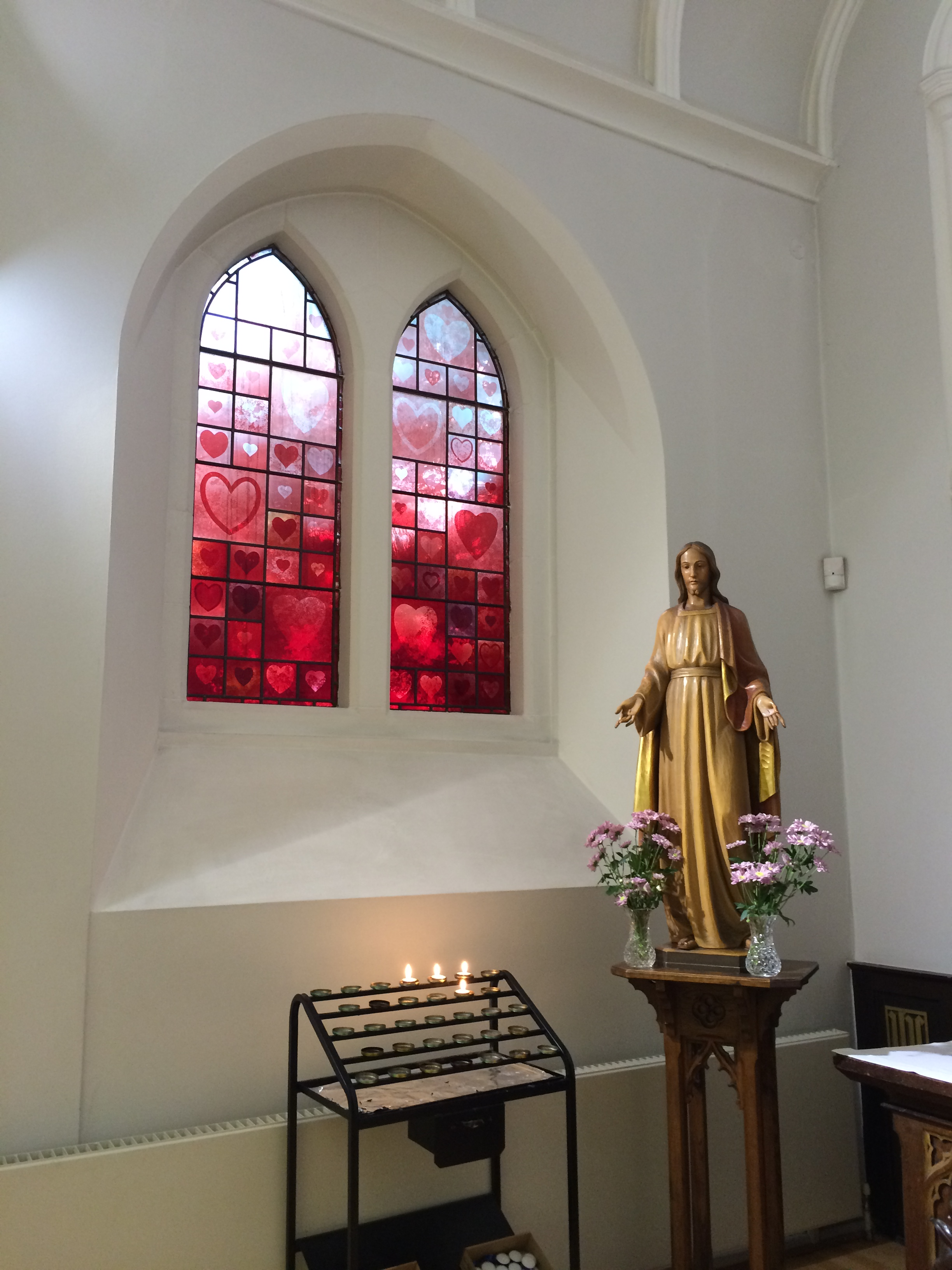
Sacred Heart Window

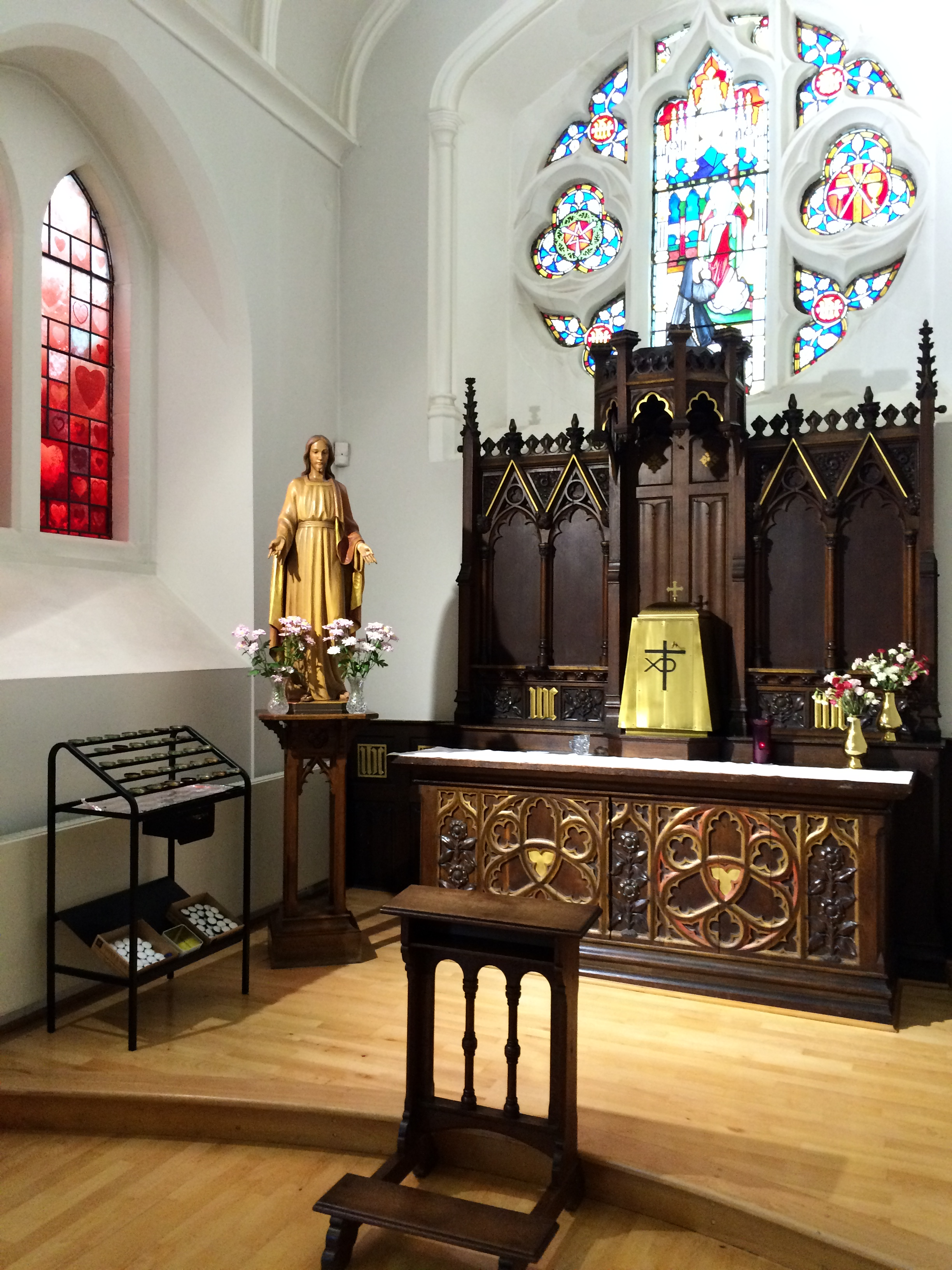
Sacred Heart Chapel

== Our Lady Chapel ==
The cooler coloured modern window of the Lady Chapel is a meditation on the theme of grief and consolation and is inspired by the grief of Our Lady. This window contains the letter M signifying Mary; a crown to represent Mary as Queen of Heaven and tears of a sorrowing mother.

The original rose window above the altar depicts the Annunciation, the announcement of the Incarnation by the angel Gabriel to Mary.

Both modern windows in the side chapels are made of flashed glass imported from France. A flash is a thin layer of colour applied over a clear base, and this thin layer can be etched away with hydrofluoric acid to show the underlying colourless glass or to give any shade between the original deep blue (or red) to the palest tint. The firm shapes of the letters and hearts were made using a plastic film to resist the acid and the more organic textures were created using a bituminous resist.

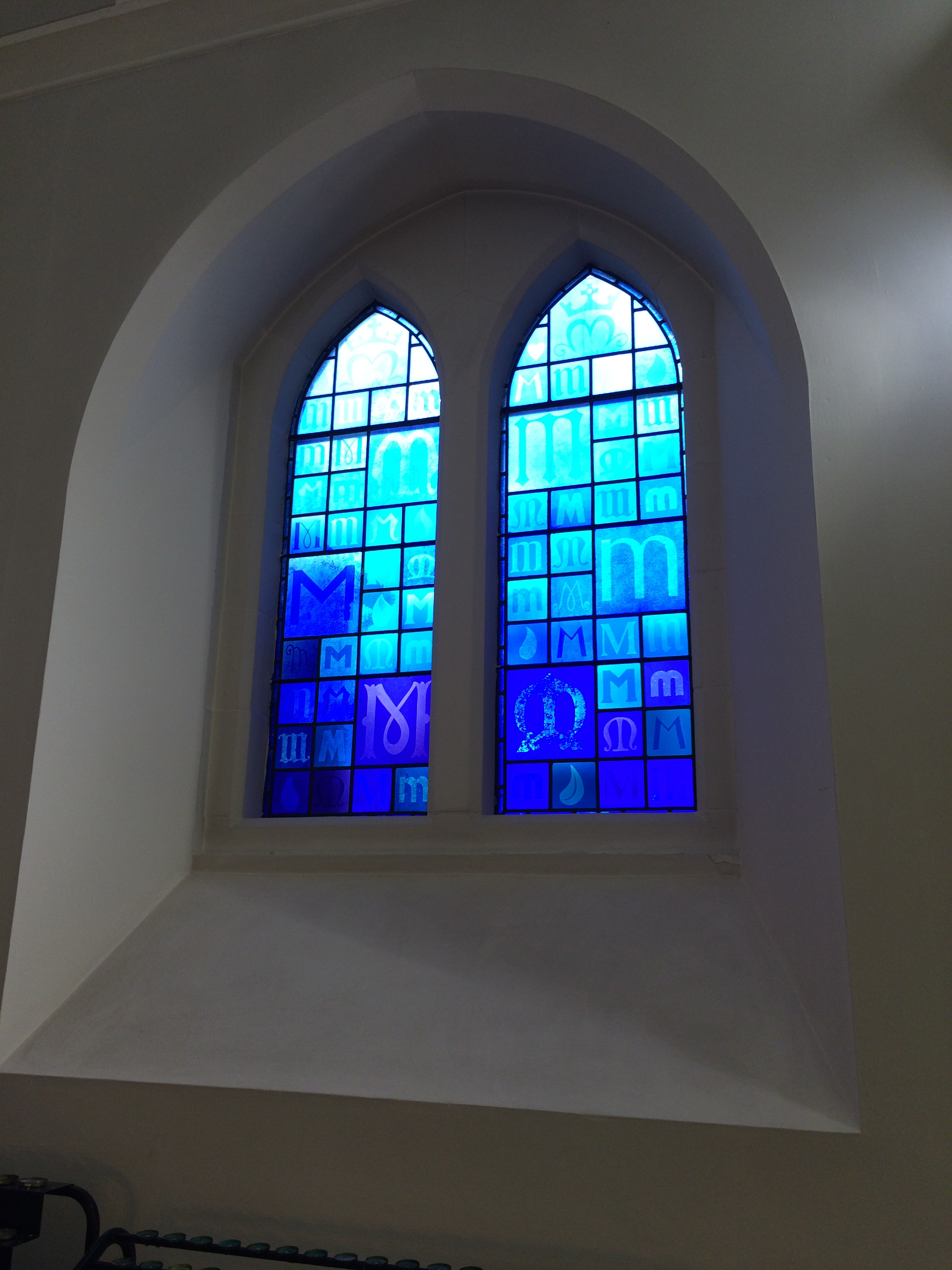
Our Lady Window

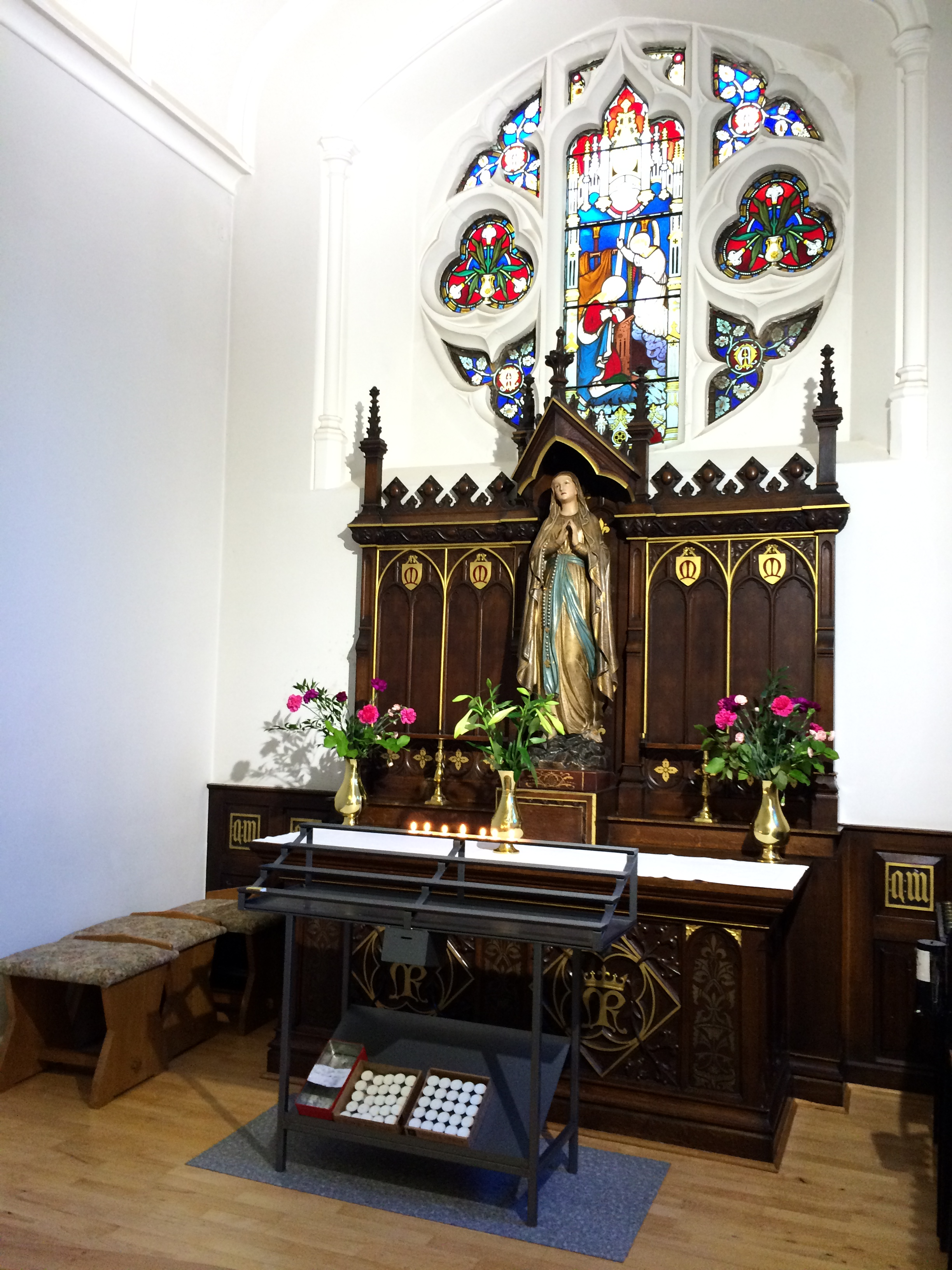
Our Lady Chapel

== Reconciliation Room ==
Under the gallery is the new Reconciliation Room, this was the old baptistry. Within this room there are two original stained glass windows. One of the baptism of Jesus in the Jordan the other of Jesus preaching in the Temple. Within this room you will also find the sanctuary cross used in St. Margarets between 1970s and 1999.

In 2016, a Holy Door for the Year of Mercy was opened between the Reconciliation Room and the porch.

== The Stations of the Cross ==
The Stations of the Cross trace the story of the Passion using hands as the main symbolic image. There are hands placing a crown of thorns, hands carrying the cross, hands offering comfort, hands in torment and hands tormenting. As well as the images, the colours are also symbolic.

Each time Jesus falls, brown has been used for the earth itself, if you look closely at the hands you will see that at each fall the pain is greater.

A softer warmer brown is used for the wood of the cross and the strength of Simon of Cyrene.

Blue expresses grief in the saddest moments, when Jesus stretches out his hand to his Mother, when he meets the mourning women and when he is taken down from the cross.

Red expresses violence when Christ is stripped of his clothes and at the moment of death. The strongest red defines the most violent act, when the flesh is actually pierced by the nails. At the moment of Jesus' death the veil of the temple was torn right down the middle. This station shows the emptiness, the void of death when Jesus has died and is gone.

Green is used for the gentleness of Veronica, for the living branches of thorns and in the final image, as a symbol of hope beyond death.

Each Station is made of two sheets of glass in the same frame. One is a flashed glass carefully etched to subtly grade the colour across the sheet. The other carries the image which is printed onto the glass with an iron oxide pigment and fired in the kiln. The distance between the two sheets and the transparency of the glass give internal reflections that soften the image and create a kind of dreamy quality.

== Images ==
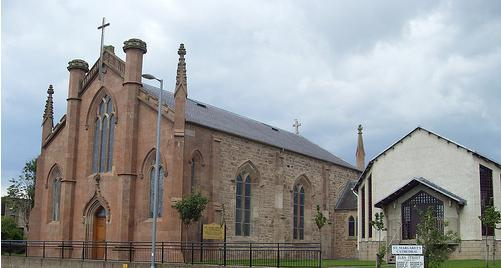
External view (with Cathedral Hall)

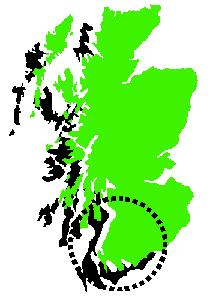
Galloway Diocese in relation to Scotland

== See also ==
- List of cathedrals in the United Kingdom
