= Good Shepherd Cathedral, Ayr =

Cathedral church in Ayr, Scotland

Coordinates: 55.4698°N 4.5992°W

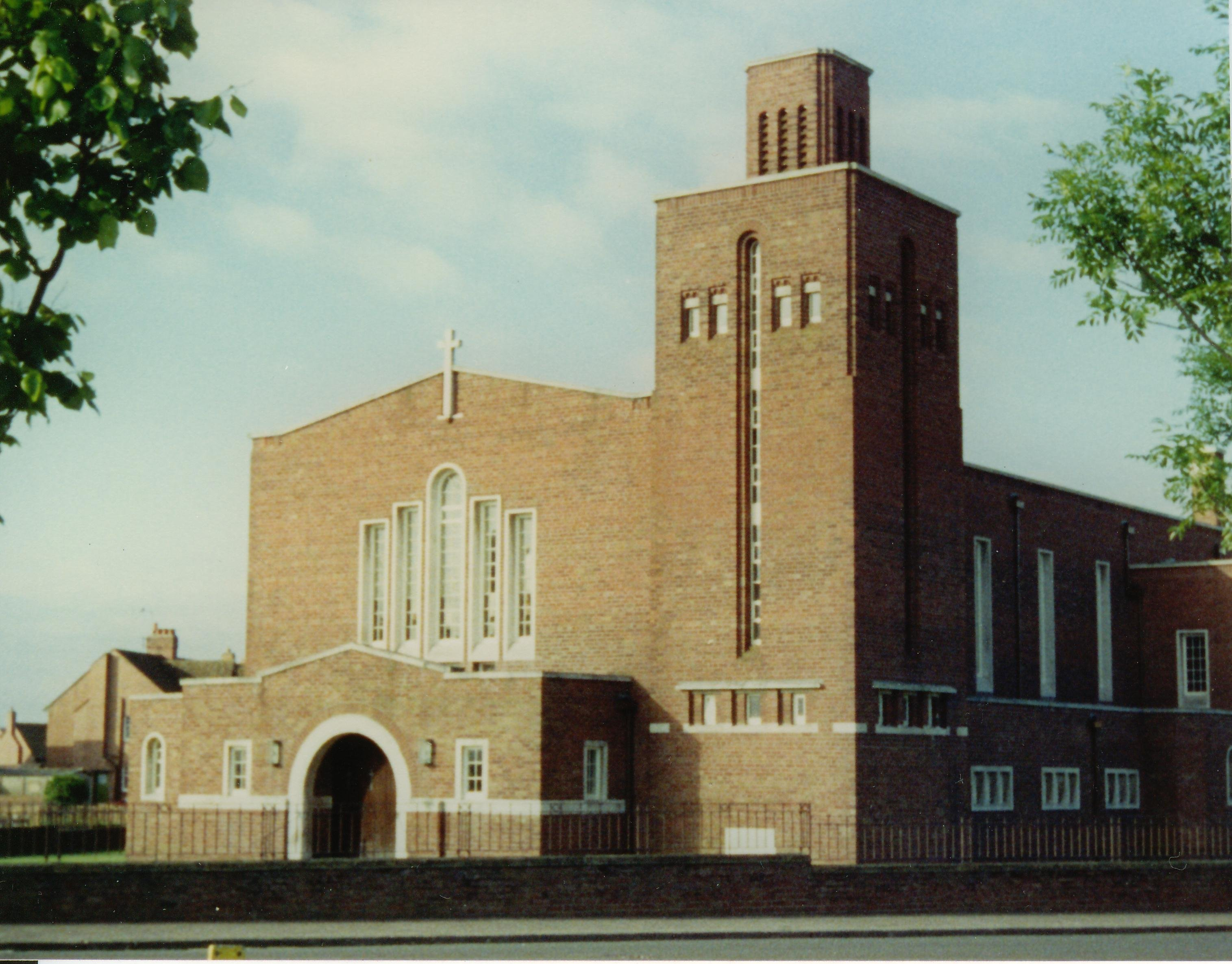
Former Cathedral of the Good Shepherd, Ayr. Architects, John Frederick Torry & William Cowie.

The Good Shepherd Cathedral in Ayr, South Ayrshire, Scotland was the cathedral church of the Roman Catholic Diocese of Galloway.

== History ==
The Church of the Good Shepherd was opened in 1957, to serve the communities of Whitletts, Dalmilling, Lochside and Braehead areas of Ayr. It was designed by John Frederick Torry and William Cowie. Before the church was constructed the people in these areas worshipped at St. Margaret's Church, Ayr and Sunday Mass was also said in Whitletts Community Centre.

The church was a parish church for four years until it was consecrated the cathedral for Galloway Diocese in 1961, after fire destroyed St. Andrew's Cathedral in Dumfries.

Only three bishops have had the Good Shepherd Cathedral as their seat: Bishop Joseph McGee (b. 1912 - d.1981), Bishop Maurice Taylor 1981 till 2004, and Bishop John Cunningham 2004–2014. Bishop Cunningham was the first Episcopal Ordination to be held in the Cathedral on the 28 May 2004.

The last Mass was said in the Good Shepherd Cathedral on 20 May 2007. This is a result of falling attendance. The Cathedral for Galloway Diocese now is St Margaret's Cathedral, Ayr.

In 2010 work began to convert the cathedral building into 25 affordable housing units by Ayrshire Housing Association. The building has Category C listed status, and the tower and gable were retained as part of the conversion. The building works were finished in 2012 with tenants moving in April of that year.
