= Roman Catholic Diocese of Galloway =

Roman Catholic diocese in Scotland

Diocese of Galloway Dioecesis Candidae Casae o Gallovidianus

Catholic
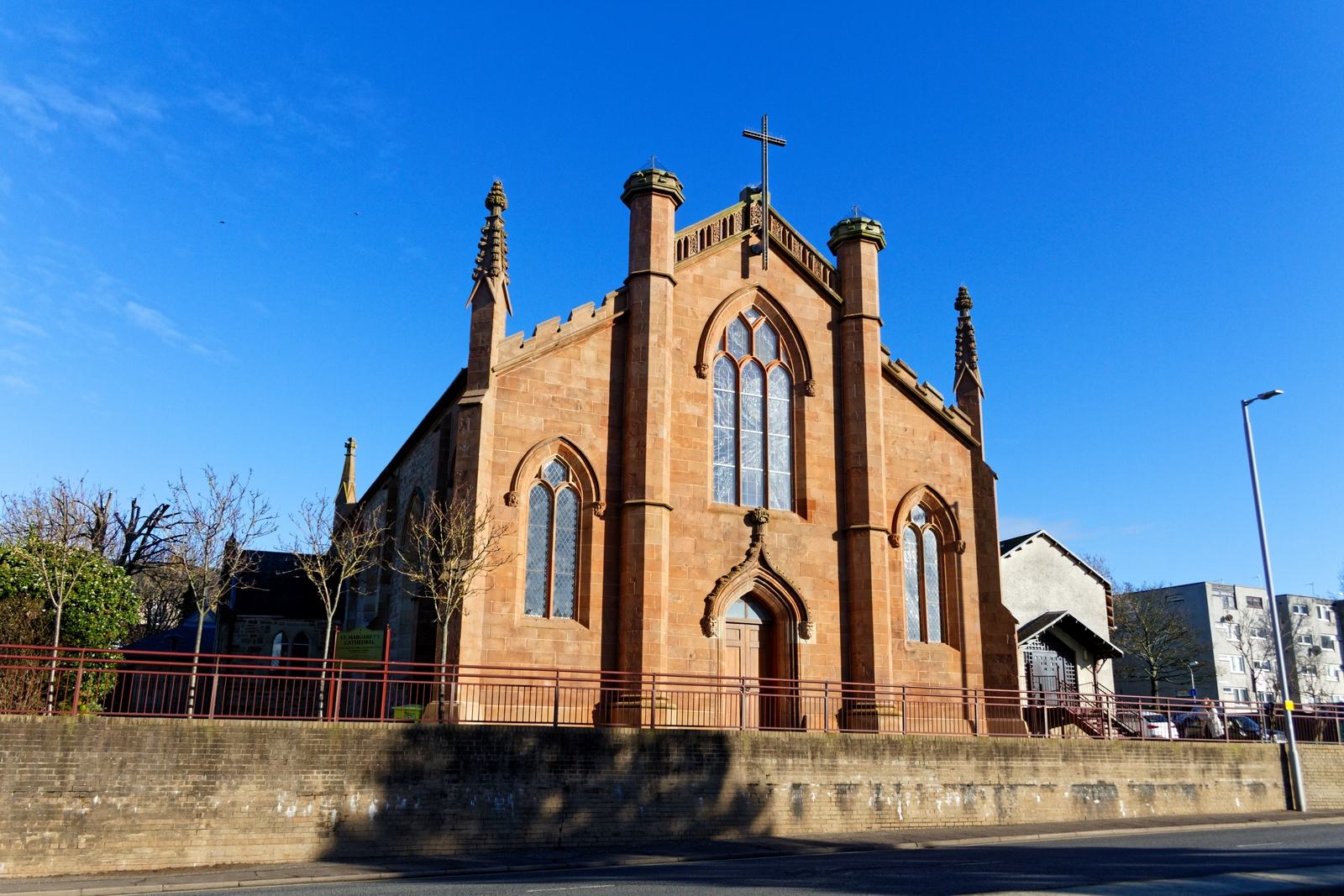
- St Margaret's Cathedral, Ayr

- Coat of arms

Location
- Country: Scotland
- Territory: Covers the council areas of Dumfries and Galloway, South Ayrshire, East Ayrshire and mainland North Ayrshire and Cumbrae
- Ecclesiastical province: St Andrews and Edinburgh
- Metropolitan: St Andrews and Edinburgh
- Coordinates: 55.44868°N 4.63039°W

Statistics
- Area: 9,332 km^{2} (3,603 sq mi)
- Population: Total; Catholics: (as of 2019); 520,260; 41,353 (7.9%)

Information
- Denomination: Roman Catholic
- Rite: Latin Rite
- Established: 4 March 1878
- Cathedral: St Margaret's Cathedral, Ayr

Current leadership
- Pope: Leo XIV
- Bishop: Francis Dougan
- Metropolitan Archbishop: Leo Cushley
- Vicar General: William McFadden

Website
- www.rcdg.org.uk

The Diocese of Galloway (Latin: Dioecesis Candidae Casae o Gallovidianus) is a Latin Church ecclesiastical territory or diocese of the Catholic Church in Scotland. The pre-Reformation Diocese of Galloway, founded by Ninian in the fifth century, had broken allegiance with Rome in 1560, and disappeared in 1689 in the (official) Church of Scotland but continued in the Episcopal Church of Scotland. The modern Roman Catholic diocese incorporates the local authority areas of Dumfries and Galloway, South Ayrshire, East Ayrshire and parts of North Ayrshire, (Cumbrae). The bishop's cathedra is at St Margaret's Cathedral, Ayr.

The diocese was re-established by the Catholic Church on 4 March 1878, with its cathedral in Dumfries and its territory covering the sparse and rural counties of Dumfriesshire, Kirkcudbrightshire, Wigtownshire and parts of Ayrshire. Following the reorganisation of the Archdiocese of Glasgow in 1947, parishes to the north of Galloway were transferred to it from Glasgow, creating a significant population centre for the first time around the town of Ayr. In response to this development Bishop McGee moved his residence from Dumfries to Ayr, and following a catastrophic fire at St Andrew's Cathedral in May 1962, it was decided that the Good Shepherd Church, Ayr should also become the diocesan cathedral. The third and present cathedral, following the closure of Good Shepherd Cathedral in May 2007, is St Margaret's Cathedral in Ayr.

The eighth bishop of the diocese was William Nolan, since 2022 the Archbishop of Glasgow.

== Bishops ==
=== Past and present ordinaries ===
(The following list is included in, but is not the only part of, post-Reformation bishops in the above-mentioned main article.)
The following is a list of the modern Bishops of Galloway:

- John McLachlan (appointed 22 March 1878 – died 16 January 1893)
- William Turner (appointed 16 June 1893 – died 19 January 1914)
- James William McCarthy (appointed 25 May 1914 – died 24 December 1943)
- William Henry Mellon (succeeded 24 December 1943 – died 2 February 1952)
- Joseph Michael McGee (appointed 19 July 1952 – retired 4 April 1981)
- Maurice Taylor (appointed 4 April 1981 – retired 7 April 2004)
- John Cunningham (appointed 7 April 2004 – retired 22 November 2014)
- William Nolan (appointed 22 November 2014 – installed as Archbishop of Glasgow 26 February 2022)
- Francis Dougan, (appointed 22 December 2023, ordained 9 March 2024).

=== Coadjutor Bishop ===
- William Henry Mellon (1935–1943)

== Parishes ==
The following is a list of current and former churches within the Diocese of Galloway:

- Ayr, St Margaret's Cathedral
- Ayr, St Paul's, Belmont
- Ayr, Good Shepherd Cathedral, Whitletts (church closed)
- Annan, Saint Columba
- Ardrossan, Saint Peter-in-Chains
- Auchinleck, Our Lady & St Patrick
- Beith, Our Lady of Perpetual Succour
- Castle Douglas, Saint John the Evangelist (church closed)
- Catrine, Saint Joseph (church closed)
- Cumnock, Saint John the Evangelist
- Dalbeattie, Saint Peter
- Dalry, Saint Palladius
- Darvel, Our Lady of the Valley (church closed)
- Drongan, Saint Clare (church closed)
- Dumfries, Saint Andrew
- Dumfries, Saint Teresa
- Galston, Saint Sophia
- Gatehouse of Fleet, Church of the Resurrection (closed February 2020)
- Girvan, The Sacred Hearts of Jesus and Mary
- Hurlford, Saint Paul
- Irvine, Saint John Ogilvie
- Irvine, Saint Margaret of Scotland (Closed)
- Irvine, Saint Mary
- Kilbirnie, Saint Brigid
- Kilmarnock, Saint Joseph
- Kilmarnock, Saint Matthew
- Kilmarnock, Saint Michael (church closed 2017 and demolished )
- Kilmarnock, Our Lady of Mount Carmel
- Kilwinning, Saint Winin
- Kirkconnel, Saint Conal (church closed)
- Kirkcudbright, Saint Andrew and Saint Cuthbert
- Langholm, Saint Francis of Assisi (church closed)
- Largs, Saint Mary, Star of the Sea
- Lockerbie, Holy Trinity
- Maybole, Our Lady and St Cuthbert
- Millport, Isle of Cumbrae, Our Lady of Perpetual Succour
- Moffat, Saint Luke
- Mossblown, Saint Ann
- Muirkirk, Saint Thomas, Apostle
- New Abbey, Saint Mary
- Newton Stewart, Our Lady and Saint Ninian
- Prestwick, Saint Quivox
- Saltcoats, Saint Brendan (closed)
- Saltcoats, Our Lady, Star of the Sea
- Stevenston, Saint John
- Stewarton, Our Lady and Saint John (closed 2019)
- Stranraer, Saint Joseph
- Troon, Our Lady of the Assumption and Saint Meddan
- Waterside, Saint Francis Xavier
- West Kilbride, Saint Bride
- Whithorn, Saint Martin and Saint Ninian
- Wigtown, The Sacred Heart (no Sunday Mass)

== See also ==
- Catholic Church in Scotland
