= William Nolan (bishop) =

Scottish prelate

The Most Reverend William Nolan
- Archbishop of Glasgow
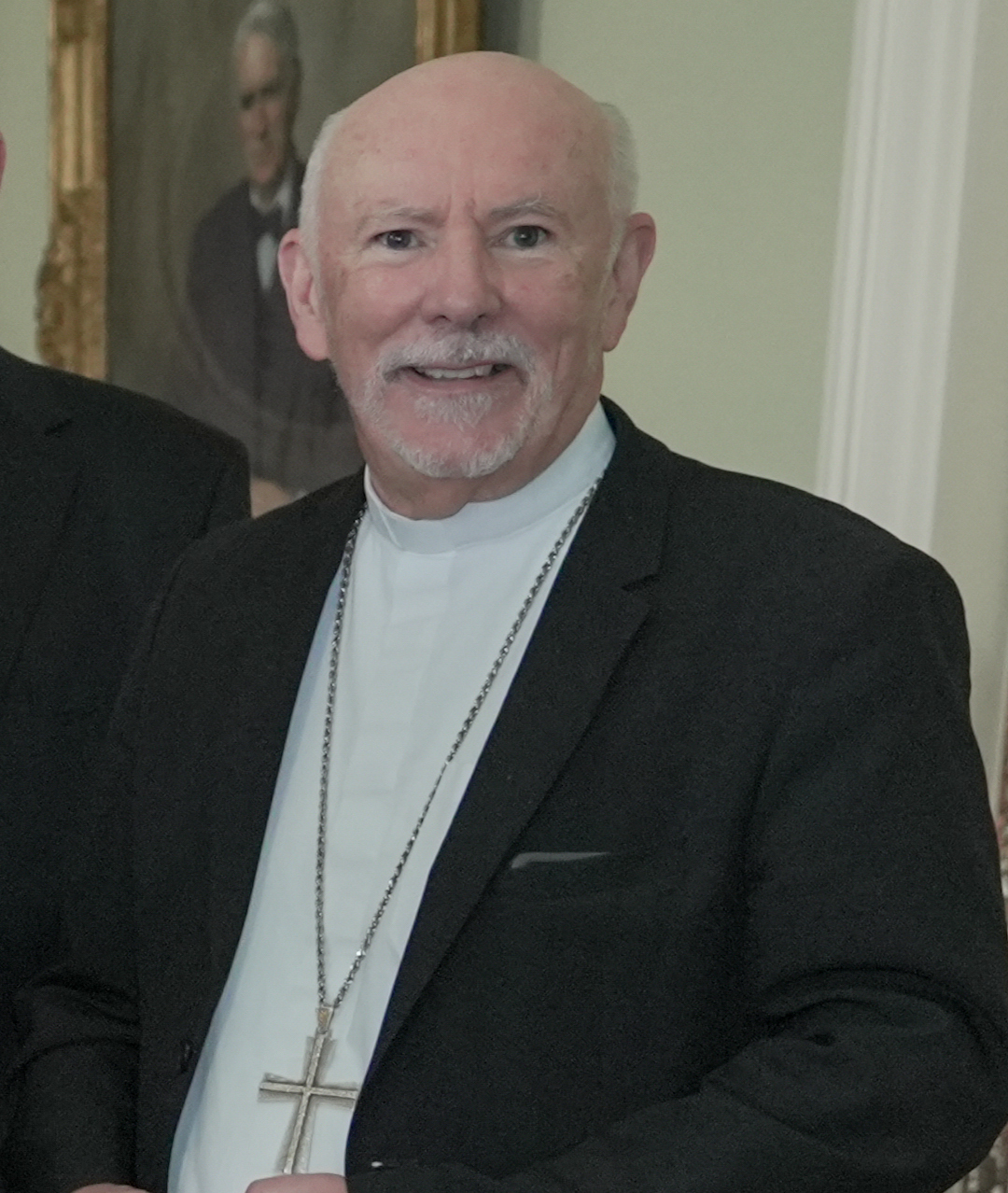
- Nolan in 2024
- Church: Roman Catholic
- See: Glasgow
- Appointed: 4 February 2022
- Installed: 26 February 2022
- Predecessor: Philip Tartaglia
- Previous post: Bishop of Galloway (2014–2022)

Orders
- Ordination: 30 June 1977
- Consecration: 14 February 2015 by Leo Cushley

Personal details
- Born: 26 January 1954 (age 72)
- Parents: William and Catherine Nolan
- Education: Pontifical Scots College, Rome; Pontifical Gregorian University
- Motto: Sibilus Aurae Tenius (1 Kings 19:12, 'The Sound of Sheer Silence')

Styles of William Nolan
- Reference style: The Most Reverend
- Spoken style: Archbishop
- Religious style: Archbishop

William Nolan (born 26 January 1954) is a Scottish prelate of the Catholic Church who has been Archbishop of Glasgow within the Roman Catholic Archdiocese of Glasgow since February 2022. He was previously Bishop of Galloway from 2015 to 2022.

== Early life ==
William Nolan was born on 26 January 1954 and baptised in St Patrick’s Church, Craigneuk. He was the fourth of eleven children born to William and Catherine Nolan and has five brothers and five sisters. He attended Cathedral Primary School, Motherwell, St Patrick’s Primary School, Craigneuk, St Vincent’s College, Langbank, and, from 1967 to 1971, St Mary’s College, Blairs.

== Ordained ministry ==
=== Priest ===
Nolan completed his studies for ordination at the Pontifical Scots College, Rome, from 1971 to 1978, earning a licence in sacred theology from Pontifical Gregorian University in June 1978.

Nolan was ordained a priest for the Diocese of Motherwell on 30 June 1977. He was assistant priest at Our Lady of Lourdes, East Kilbride, from 1978 to 1980 and at St. David's, Plains, from 1980 to 1983. He was Vice-Rector of the Scots College in Rome from 1983 to 1990. Returning to Scotland, he was assistant priest at St Bridget’s, Baillieston, from 1990 to 1994. While parish priest at Our Lady of Lourdes, East Kilbride, from 1994 to 2014 he held several other assignments, including judge of the National Ecclesisatical Tribunal in Scotland, dean of his zone, head of permanent formation of the clergy of Motherwell, and a member and vice-president of the Presbyteral Council. He became vicar general of the Motherwell Diocese in June 2014.

In 2013 Nolan was appointed administrator of St John Ogilvie Parish in Blantyre when its pastor, Matthew Despard, was suspended during a canonical investigation. Despard had published an attack on the Church hierarchy and tangled with Bishop Joseph Toal, apostolic administrator of the diocese. Despard's refusal to accept his removal produced an extended dispute with Nolan.

=== Bishop ===
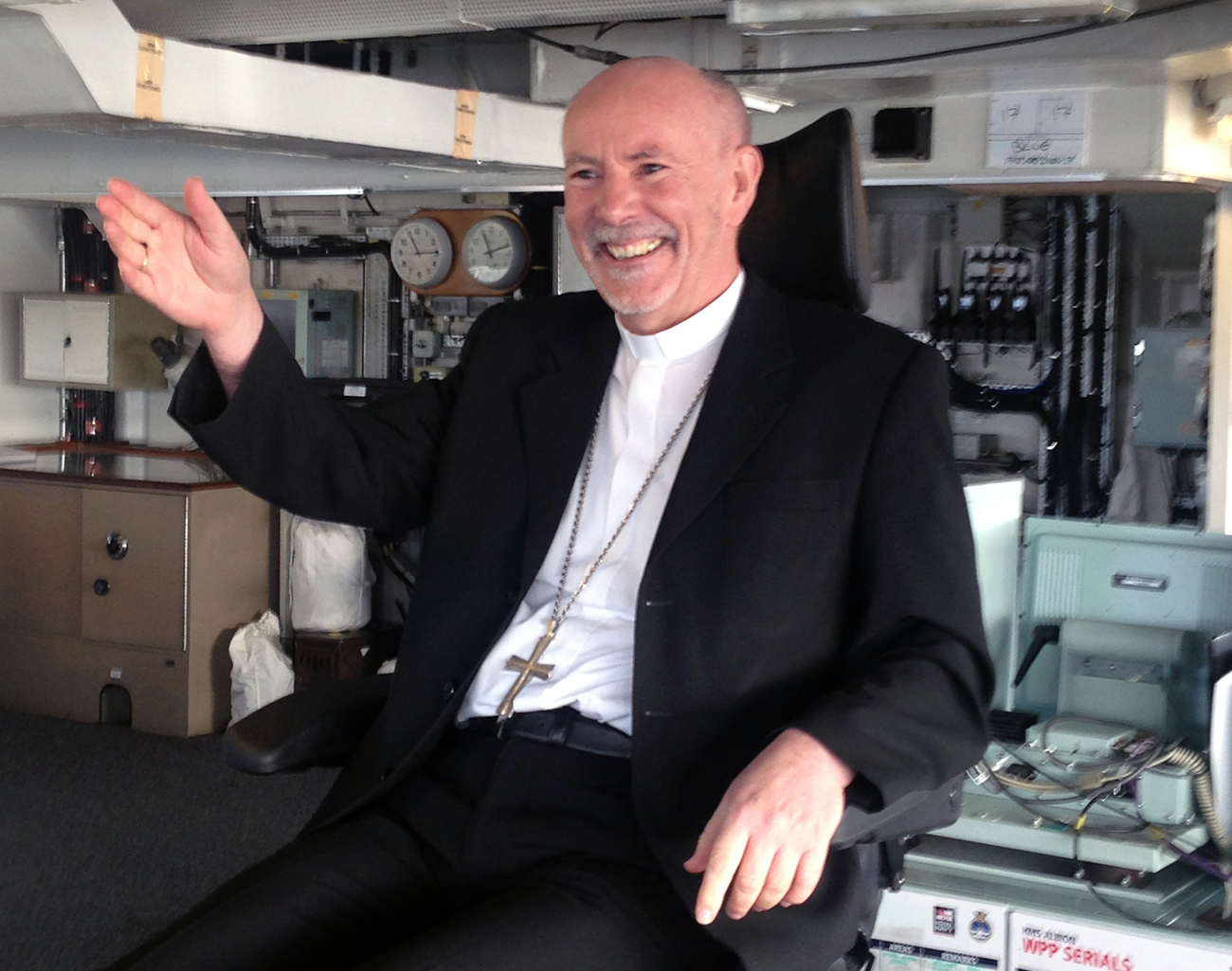
Nolan in the captain's chair aboard HMS Albion, November 2017

Pope Francis appointed Nolan on 22 November 2014 to succeed John Cunningham as Bishop of Galloway. Nolan received his episcopal consecration on 14 February 2015 from Leo Cushley. The Apostolic Nuncio Archbishop Antonio Mennini and Bishop emeritus Maurice Taylor served as principal co-consecrators. At the time of his appointment, the Galloway diocese had "a troubled history of rebel priests" and Nolan's predecessor had been incapacitated by poor health for several years.

He managed the scandal of a priest of the diocese who stole parish funds to support a gambling addiction in 2015 and was jailed in June 2016. Nolan suffered a heart attack in August 2016.

In January 2021 Nolan called upon His Majesty's Government to sign the Treaty on the Prohibition of Nuclear Weapons and abandon its nuclear arsenal. In May 2021, along with Bishop Paul McAleenan, he criticised the government's plans for asylum-seekers. In 2021 he established a Scotland-wide Care of Creation Office to reflect the priorities of Pope Francis' encyclical Laudato Si' and anticipating the 2021 United Nations Climate Change Conference in Glasgow in November.

On 4 February 2022 Pope Francis appointed him to succeed Philip Tartaglia as Archbishop of Glasgow. He was installed there on 26 February.

He is the president of Justice and Peace Scotland, a national body that advocates on a variety of social issues from climate change to nuclear weapons. He serves on the board of the Scottish Catholic International Aid Fund. Within the Scottish Bishops Conference he heads the Commission on Justice and Peace and The Tablet magazine has described him as "Scotland’s justice and peace bishop".

In the October 2026 edition of the archdiocesan magazine "Flourish", Nolan presented a plan for restructuring the diocese, including the reducing the number of parishes by half.

Catholic Church titles
Preceded by John Cunningham	Bishop of Galloway; 2014–2022	Succeeded by Francis Dougan
Preceded by Philip Tartaglia	Archdiocese of Glasgow; 2022–present	Incumbent
