= Sinclair Academy =

Sinclair Academy is a secondary level school, in Winchburgh, West Lothian, Scotland. It is named after Margaret Sinclair, a social and trade union activist. The school has a shared sports block with other local schools.

== History ==
Construction of the school began in 2020 following a new town expansion plan in Winchburgh. The development was part of Winchburgh Schools Campus project (a combined cost of £60 million). The school was built by Morrison Construction.

In August 2023, the school received its first intake of its new pupils. The school was officially opened in October 2023 by Leo Cushley Archbishop of St Andrews and Edinburgh Diocese. It was the 13th secondary school in West Lothian. Dr Gerry Burns was the first headteacher of the school. There has been a call to include some nearby Edinburgh students within the school's catchment area.

In 2025, Anne-Marie Jess was appointed as the headteacher of the school. In 2025, the school closed temporarily for a few days due to issues with its water supply (the other nearby schools were also affected).

In 2026, the school reached over 400 pupils and only has 4 year groups

== Arms ==
Coat of arms of Sinclair Academy

Notes
Arms were granted by the Lyon Court in 2026.
Motto
Revela Domino Opera Tua
