= Winchburgh Academy =

Secondary school in Winchburgh, West Lothian, Scotland

Coordinates: 55.9621°N 3.4811°W

Location
- Linlithgow Road; Winchburgh, West Lothian, EH52 6FY

Information
- Established: 2022
- Website: https://winchburghacademy.westlothian.org.uk/

Winchburgh Academy is a secondary level school, in Winchburgh, West Lothian, Scotland.

The school is adjacent to B9080 road which is to the west of Winchburgh village centre.

== History ==
Plans and funding for the school were first announced in July 2019. Planning approval for the construction of the school was given in January 2020 with the school due for completion in August 2022. The school was built under control of Hub South East, with Morrison Construction as the primary contractor. The academy is part of a wider £60 million academic campus that includes Winchburgh's two primary schools.

In July 2022, the construction of the academy buildings was completed on time. The first students attended in August 2022. The school was initially planned to allow 660 young persons to attend but has a design capacity to increase to accommodate 1,210 pupils. The first headteacher of the school is Jonny Mitchell, who joined the school after leaving Chryston High School in North Lanarkshire.

In 2025, the school closed temporarily for a few days due to issues with its water supply (the other nearby schools were also affected). In April 2025, pupils from the school won a Royal Community Impact Award.

== Facilities ==
Students have access to a sports and wellbeing hub on campus.
