= Leo Cushley =

Scottish Catholic prelate (born 1961)

The Most Reverend Leo Cushley JCD
- Archbishop of St Andrews and Edinburgh
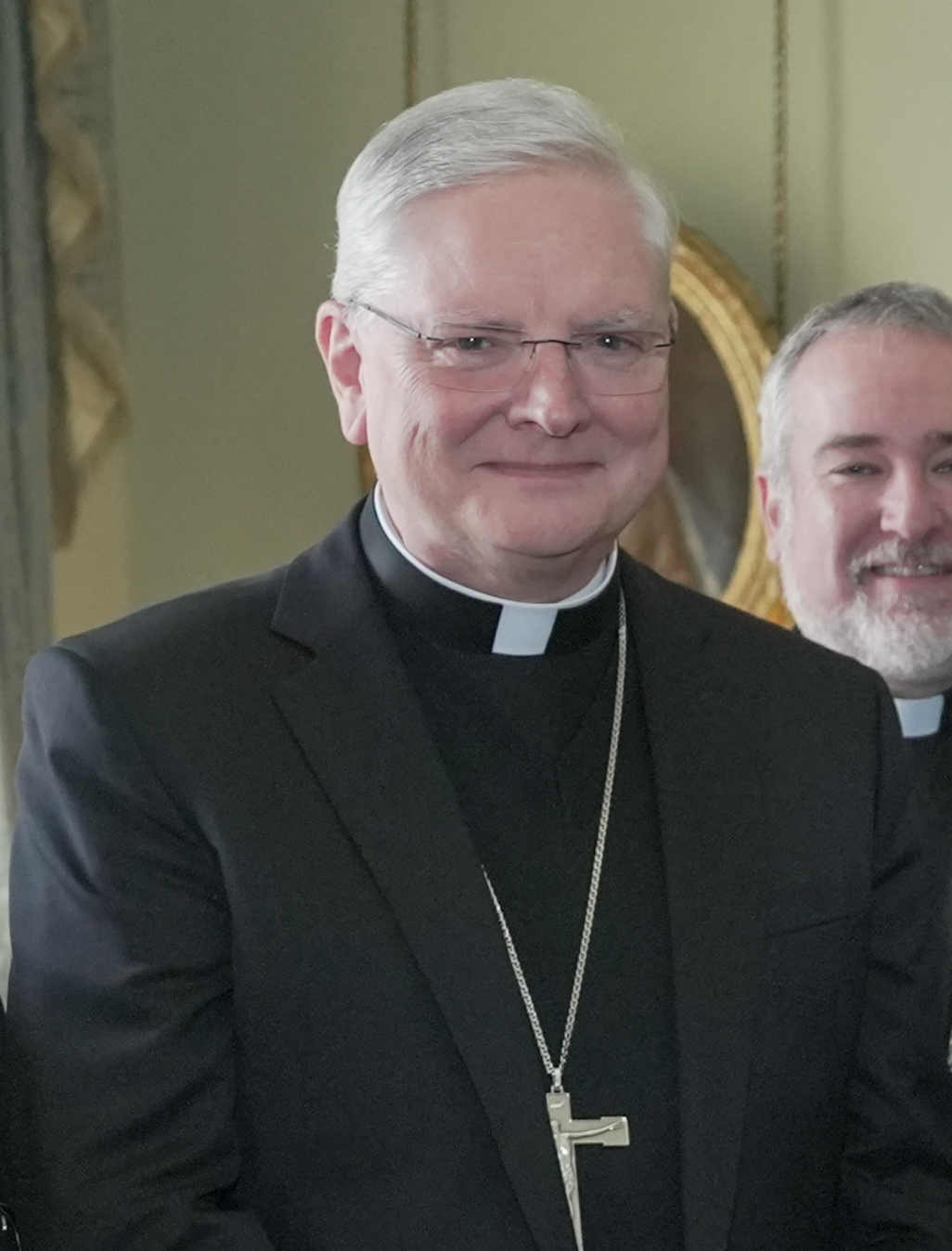
- Cushley in 2024
- Church: Roman Catholic
- Archdiocese: St Andrews and Edinburgh
- Province: St Andrews and Edinburgh
- Appointed: 24 July 2013
- Installed: 21 September 2013
- Predecessor: Keith Cardinal O'Brien

Orders
- Ordination: 7 July 1985 by Joseph Devine
- Consecration: 21 September 2013 by James Harvey, Philip Tartaglia, Antonio Mennini

Personal details
- Born: Leo William Cushley; 18 June 1961 (age 65) Airdrie, Scotland
- Denomination: Roman Catholicism
- Parents: Eileen and Bill Cushley
- Education: Pontifical Ecclesiastical Academy; Pontifical Gregorian University; Scots College, Rome
- Coat of arms: Leo Cushley's coat of arms

Styles of Leo Cushley
- Reference style: The Most Reverend
- Spoken style: Your Grace
- Religious style: Archbishop

Ordination history of Leo Cushley
History
Priestly ordination
- Ordained by: Joseph Devine
Episcopal consecration
- Principal consecrator: James Harvey
- Co-consecrators: Philip Tartaglia, Antonio Mennini
Episcopal succession
Bishops consecrated by Leo Cushley as principal consecrator
- William Nolan: 14 February 2015
- Brian McGee: 18 February 2016
- Francis Dougan: 9 March 2024
- Andrew McKenzie: 10 August 2024

Leo William Cushley (born 18 June 1961) is a Scottish Catholic prelate who has served as Archbishop of St Andrews and Edinburgh since 2013. He previously served as head of the English language section of the Vatican Secretariat of State.

Patron of the Catholic Union of Great Britain since 2026.

== Early life ==
Leo Cushley was born on 18 June 1961 in Wester Moffat Hospital, Airdrie, North Lanarkshire, the first child of Bill and Eileen Cushley; he has a younger brother and a younger sister.

He attended All Saints' Primary School, Coatdyke (1966–1967), before finishing his primary education at St John the Baptist's Primary School, Uddingston (1967–1973). He went on to attend Holy Cross High School, Hamilton (1973–1975), and St Mary's College, Blairs, Aberdeen (1975–1979).

== Formation, studies and priesthood ==
Cushley first began studying for the priesthood at St Mary's College, Blairs, Aberdeen. From 1980 to 1985 he studied philosophy and theology at the Pontifical Gregorian University. He was ordained to the priesthood for the Diocese of Motherwell on 7 July 1985 at the Church of St John the Baptist, Uddingston, by Bishop Joseph Devine. From 1979 to 1987 he attended Pontifical Scots College, Rome. He continued his studies in Rome being granted a Licentiate of Sacred Theology at the Pontifical Institute of Sacred Liturgy in 1987.

He returned to the Diocese of Motherwell that year as an assistant priest at the Cathedral Church of Our Lady of Good Aid, where he remained until he was appointed curate at St Serf's Parish, Airdrie and concurrently chaplain to St Margaret's High School in 1988. He remained there until 1992 when he was sent to St Aidan's Parish, Wishaw as well as serving as chaplain to St Aidan's High School, Wishaw and chaplain to Our Lady's High School, Motherwell.

=== Diplomatic career ===
In 1994 Cushley was summoned to the Pontifical Ecclesiastical Academy, studying diplomacy at the same time as studying for a doctorate in canon law (JCD) at the Pontifical Gregorian University, which he earned in 1997. He formally entered the Diplomatic Service of the Holy See on 1 July 1997. Cushley has served in the nunciatures of Egypt, Burundi, Portugal and the United Nations in New York and South Africa.

From 2009 until 2013, Cushley was head of the English-language section of the Vatican Secretariat of State. In that capacity, he was responsible for accompanying the pope during all his visits to English speaking countries, such as the visits by Benedict XVI to Malta, Cyprus and the United Kingdom in 2010. In 2012, he took on an additional role in the Vatican when he was appointed to the ceremonial position of "prelate of the anticamera", with duties that include assisting when the pope receives visits from prominent dignitaries such as heads of state.

== Episcopal appointment ==
On 24 July 2013 Cushley was appointed as the Archbishop of St Andrews and Edinburgh, less than a year after Cardinal O'Brien resigned over sexual misconduct. On appointment, Cushley stated:

Whatever happens though, it is my sincere hope and my intention to do whatever I have to do, always in truth, but also with charity, with a view to the reconciliation and the healing of the Catholics in Edinburgh, who I am sure have been upset and dismayed by these events.

Cushley was consecrated and installed on 21 September, the Feast of Saint Matthew, where the principal consecrators were Cardinal James Michael Harvey of the Basilica of Saint Paul Outside the Walls; the Papal Nuncio, Antonio Mennini; and Archbishop Philip Tartaglia of Glasgow.

Cushley's assistant responded to one victim of child sex abuse with, "While the archbishop sympathises with your situation, he regrets that he is unable to assist you."

Under guidance from the Vatican's Congregation for the Doctrine of the Faith, Cushley banned theologian Tina Beattie from lecturing to a lay Catholic group, the Newman Society, saying that "Beattie was known frequently to have called into question the church’s teaching".

In Lent 2015, Cushley outlined his vision for the future of the archdiocese in a pastoral letter entitled "We Have Found the Messiah". The document's stated aim was to "respond to the mission entrusted to him [Cushley] by Pope Francis: to bring the joy of the Gospel to contemporary society."

Following the publication of the letter, Cushley embarked upon 32 public meetings across the Archdiocese to discuss his ideas, which include the possibility of creating larger parish units through either mergers or closures.

Cushley planned to restart a dormant office dealing with poor and marginalised people. He said that Pope Francis wanted more to be done for poor people. Cushley wanted to quickly find out what the archdiocese does for destitute people, unemployed people, drug addicts and others who are traditionally helped. Cushley wanted to see if improvements were possible.

In February 2015 Cushley was criticised in an op-ed article published in The Observer newspaper which noted that the Catholic Church in Scotland had not corporately joined Churches Mutual Credit Union, a new credit union co-founded by other Scottish Christian denominations. It also called upon Cushley to sell his official residence, St Benet's, to provide funds for poor people.

In November 2022 The Scotsman reported that Cushley had been accused of "deliberate financial mismanagement". He was also accused of using "authoritarian" language to gain money from parishioners within his diocese. The Office of the Scottish Charities Regulator (OSCR) later confirmed that no financial mismanagement had taken place and commended the Trustees of the Archdiocese for their work in seeking to "dispel various misunderstandings" regarding the Aged & Infirm Clergy Fund of the Archdiocese.

In October 2023 he officially opened Sinclair Academy in Winchburgh.

Cushley is the Grand Prior of the Scotland Lieutenancy of the Equestrian Order of the Holy Sepulchre of Jerusalem.

== Keith O'Brien ==
Keith O'Brien stood down as archbishop after three priests and a former priest accused him of predatory and unwelcome sexual contact in the 1980s. In September 2013 "Cushley...suggested that O’Brien will not be permitted to return to Scotland and is likely to spend his remaining years in exile." according to The Scotsman. By contrast the BBC claimed "Cushley conceded it was 'not impossible' that the cardinal would one day return, but made it clear he did not believe that possibility was likely or desirable." Cushley also said he did not believe an independent investigation into O'Brien was necessary.

Talking about the situation with O'Brien, Cushley denied that the church was at its lowest ebb, though the Church had taken a battering. Cushley said that the people of the Archdiocese wished to leave the matter behind. He also said, "Cardinal O’Brien’s behaviour distressed many, demoralised faithful Catholics and made the church less credible to those who are not Catholic", but called for forgiveness.

Catholic Church titles
Preceded by Keith O'Brien	Archbishop of St Andrews and Edinburgh; 2013–present	Incumbent
