= Winchburgh rail crash =

1862 train crash in Scotland

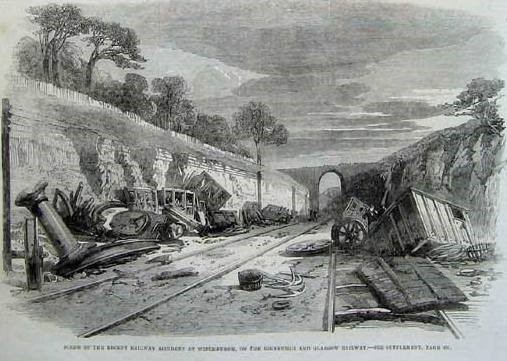
- Winchburgh rail crash

Details
- Date: 13 October 1862; 18:30
- Location: Winchburgh, Linlithgowshire
- Coordinates: 55°58′26″N 3°29′32″W
- Country: Scotland
- Line: Edinburgh and Glasgow Railway
- Cause: Points maintenance error

Statistics
- Trains: 2
- Deaths: 17
- Injured: 35-100

The Winchburgh rail crash was a multi-train rail crash that occurred on Monday 13 October 1862, 1 1/2 miles (2.4 km) northwest of Winchburgh in Linlithgowshire (now West Lothian). The crash caused 17 deaths (15 passengers and two employees died) and is the fourth most deadly rail accident in Scotland.

== Accident ==
The accident occurred at night at the location near Winchburgh where the Edinburgh and Glasgow Railway passes through a cutting on a curve. During the night of the accident, only one line was in use due to track maintenance when two trains met head-on. The drivers saw each other when they were some 300 yards (270 m) apart and managed to slow down so that their relative speed was under 30 mph (50 km/h) when they collided. The driver of the Glasgow train leapt clear prior to the impact and survived though badly injured, but both firemen and the driver of the other train along with 15 passengers were killed and between 35 and 100 injured. One of the passengers made their way to a local home named Craigton House and commandeered a horse and cart to drive over 4 miles (6.4 km) to Linlithgow, raise the alarm and summon doctors to the scene. A special train arrived from Edinburgh bringing workmen who laboured all night to free the dead and injured, and then to clear the wreckage; indeed the line was back in use the following day.

It was the standard practice that to prevent such collisions, a pilot engine would work the line to escort every train along the length of single track. However, at the time of the crash, the pilot engine was being used for other duties and had waggons attached to it; moreover a larger engine had been substituted for the distinctive small one used as the pilot. The inexperienced pointsman saw a ballast train following the train from Glasgow and wrongly assumed it to be the pilot engine and so let the train through; just then, the Edinburgh train was approaching from the east.

Among the 17 dead was James Hosie, manager of the Oakley Iron Works and founder of the Bathgate Foundry, as well as John Wightman, the Earl of Lauderdale’s estate manager.

== Consequences ==
Legal charges were brought against the pointsman but dropped. Charges of culpable homicide were then brought against two officials of the Edinburgh and Glasgow Railway Company but a jury found them not guilty.

== Bibliography ==
- Winchburgh Railway Disaster 1862 published 2006 by The West Lothian Local History Library which quotes from The Scotsman and The Falkirk Herald
