= Francis Dougan =

Scottish bishop of the Roman Catholic Church

The Right Reverend Francis Dougan
- Bishop of Galloway
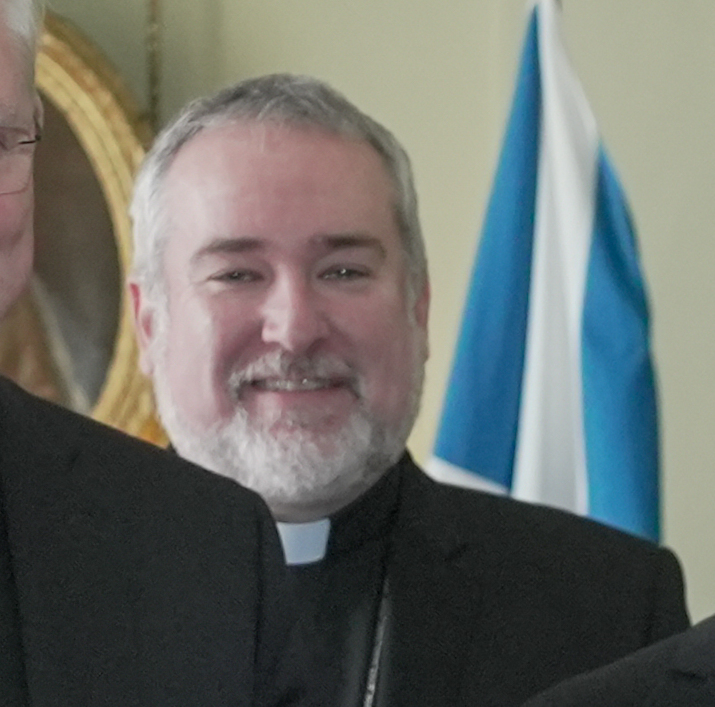
- Dougan in 2024
- Church: Roman Catholic
- Diocese: Galloway
- Appointed: 22 December 2023
- Installed: 10 March 2024
- Predecessor: William Nolan

Orders
- Ordination: 27 June 2001 by Joseph Devine
- Consecration: 9 March 2024 by Leo Cushley

Personal details
- Born: Francis McAnally Dougan; 8 December 1972 (age 53) Lanark, South Lanarkshire, Scotland
- Education: Scots College, Rome
- Motto: Quench not the wavering flame

Francis Dougan (born 8 December 1972) is a Scottish Roman Catholic bishop. He was appointed Bishop of Galloway on 22 December 2023.

== Biography ==
He was born in Lanark, Scotland, on 8 December 1972.

He was ordained to the priesthood on 27 June 2001 by Bishop Joseph Devine at St Aidan's Church, Coltness for the Diocese of Motherwell. He was assistant priest of Our Lady & St Anne's, Cadzow and Chaplain to Holy Cross High School, Hamilton (2001–06); Vice-Rector of Pontifical Scots College, Rome (2006–12); parish priest of Saint Mark and Saint Anthony's Churches in Rutherglen and Chaplain to Trinity High School (2013–21); parish priest of Our Lady of Lourdes, East Kilbride (from 2021).

He was appointed Bishop of the Diocese of Galloway by Pope Francis on 22 December 2023, and received episcopal consecration on 9 March 2024 at St Peter-in-Chains, Ardrossan. The principal consecrator was Archbishop Leo Cushley of Saint Andrews and Edinburgh and the principal co-consecrators were Archbishop William Nolan of Glasgow and Bishop Joseph Toal of Motherwell. The installation of Bishop Dougan took place the following day on 10 March 2024 at St Margaret's Cathedral, Ayr.

Catholic Church titles
Preceded by William Nolan	Bishop of Galloway; 2023–present	Incumbent
