= Winchburgh =

Town in West Lothian, Scotland

Coordinates: 55.960°N 3.464°W

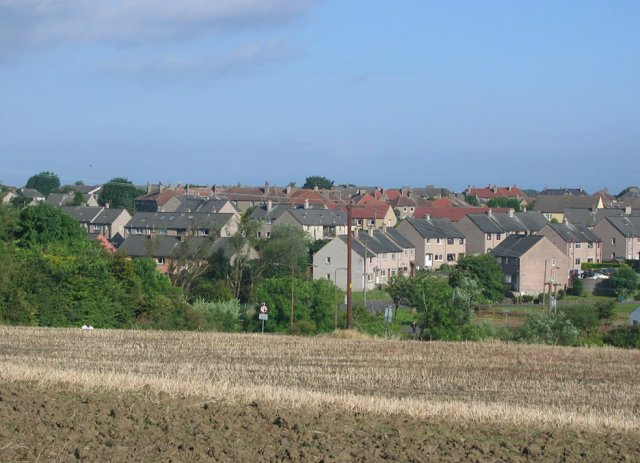
- Winchburgh, viewed from the south

- Location within West Lothian
- Population: 3,840 (2020)
- OS grid reference: NT086750
- Civil parish: Kirkliston
- Council area: West Lothian
- Lieutenancy area: West Lothian
- Country: Scotland
- Sovereign state: United Kingdom
- Post town: BROXBURN
- Postcode district: EH52
- Dialling code: 01506
- Police: Scotland
- Fire: Scottish
- Ambulance: Scottish
- UK Parliament: Livingston; Bathgate and Linlithgow
- Scottish Parliament: Linlithgow

Winchburgh is a town in Scotland. It is located approximately ten miles (sixteen kilometres) west of the city centre of Edinburgh, six miles (ten kilometres) east of Linlithgow and three miles (five kilometres) northeast of Broxburn.

== Demographics ==
The 2001 census recorded around 2,000 persons in Winchburgh. In 2015, the population of Winchburgh was cited as having increased to 2,430 people. As a result of new developments (still ongoing), the 2020 population had increased by over 50% to 3,840.

== History ==
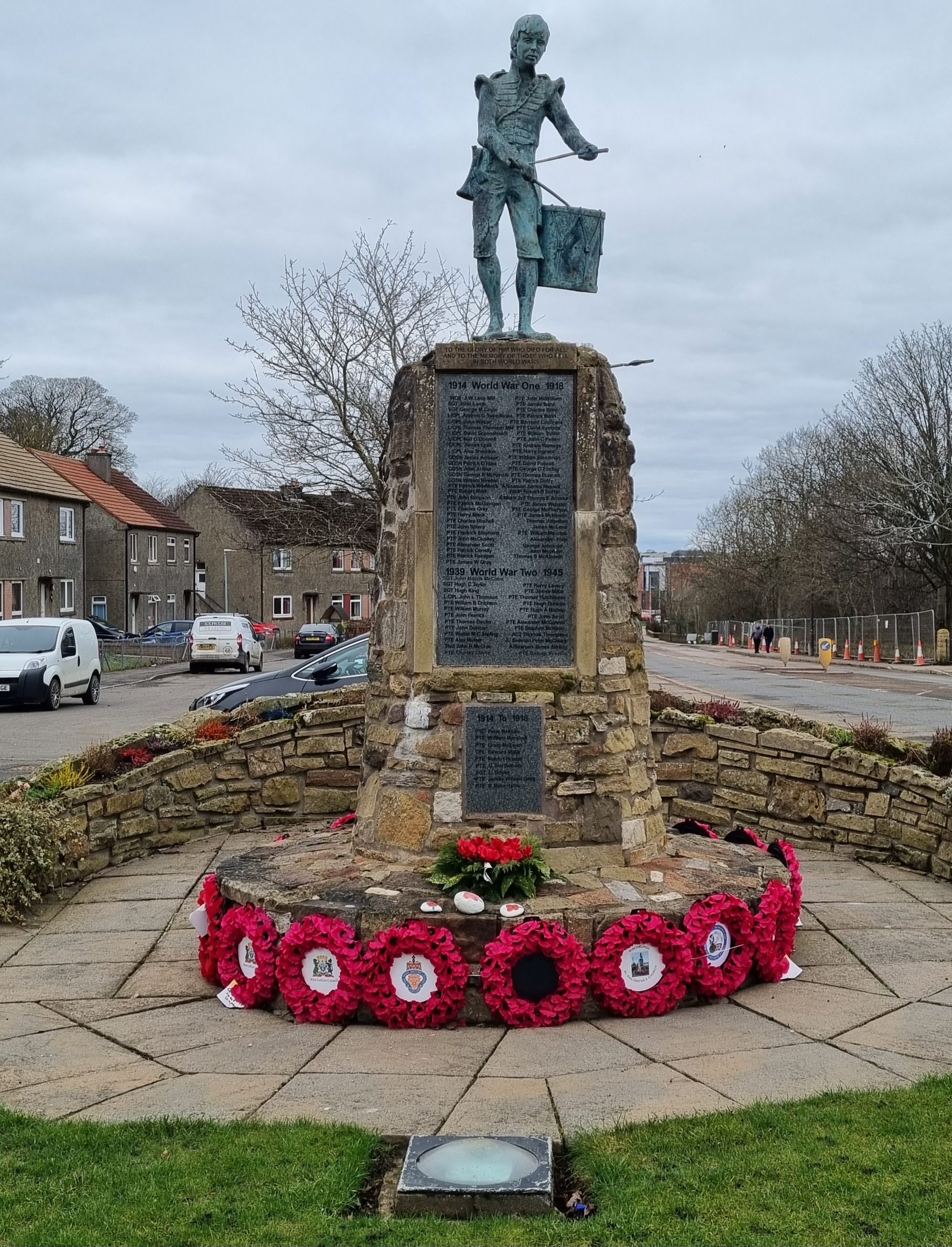
The war memorial of Winchburgh

=== Prehistory and archaeology ===
Archaeological excavations in 2013 in advance of the construction of a housing development by CFA Archaeology found the remains of a sub-circular double-ditched enclosure. Not many artefacts were found and radiocarbon dates from waterlogged wood and animal bone were between 1600–200 BC, indicating the people had been living or working in Winchburgh at least a thousand years before the earliest records of the town.

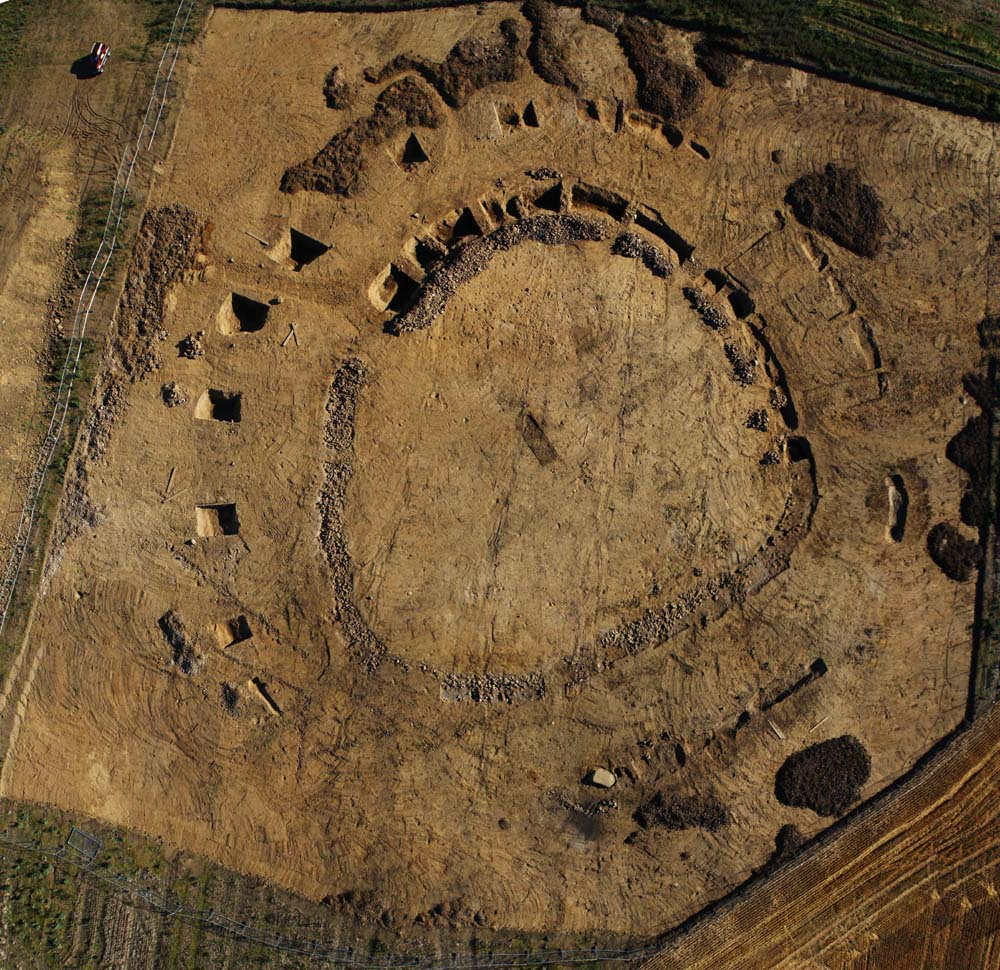
The Winchburgh, double-ditched, prehistoric enclosure during excavation. Note the car at the top left for scale.

=== Medieval history ===
There has been a settlement in Winchburgh for over one thousand years. Early spellings include Wincelburgh (1189); Wynchburghe (1377); from 'wincel' and 'burh' meaning 'Town in the nook or angle'. It is possible that it was named after the bend in the Niddry Burn that runs through the town. The early settlement was probably near to Niddry Castle.

After the Battle of Bannockburn in 1314, Sir James Douglas followed King Edward II and the remnants of his army to Winchburgh. Both sides rested at Winchburgh before riding on to Dunbar, where King Edward took ship for England.

Quhill that the king and his menye

To Wenchburg all cummyn ar.
Than lychtyt all that thai war
To bayt thar hors that wer wery,
And Douglas and his cumpany
Baytyt alsua besid thaim ner.

— Extract from The Brus by John Barbour (1320–1395), Book 13, written c.1375

Auldcathie is an historic parish and ruined pre-reformation church that lies on the western edge of Winchburgh.

In 1568, Mary, Queen of Scots, escaped from Loch Leven Castle, and was met by Lord Seton, before crossing the Firth of Forth from South Queensferry. Mary stayed at Niddry Castle, Seton's property in Winchburgh, on 2 May 1568. From the 1600s to the 1860s, Winchburgh was a small hamlet, which other than a few houses contained an inn and staging post.

=== 19th to 21st centuries ===
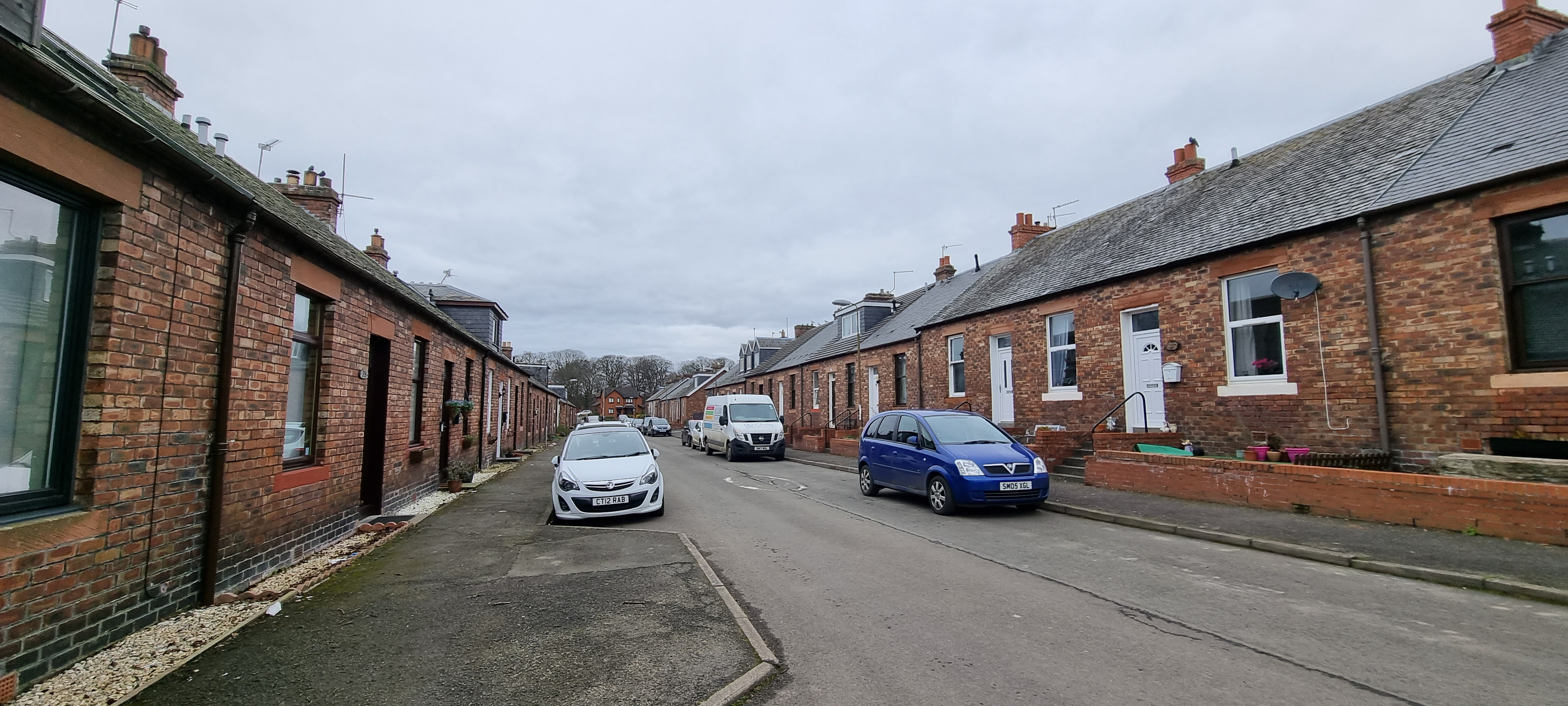
Late 19th century Miners' cottages to the east of the canal

In the 19th century, Winchburgh had a thriving oil shale mining industry, the remnants of which are the distinctive red "shale bings", large hill forms, created by the deposition composed of used shale. The bings support a variety of flora and fauna, such as bushes and heather, rabbits and, occasionally, old deer. The bings are also known locally as "tips", although it is a generally less common name for them.

On 13 October 1862 on the Edinburgh and Glasgow Railway 1 1/2 miles (2.5 kilometres) northwest of Winchburgh was the scene of a head-on rail crash in which 15 people were killed.

The late 19th century saw the development of several dozen miners' rows, built in redstone and on an interlocking L-plan to the east of the canal. The road names come from places around the estate of Hopetoun House. This period also saw the development of a public school on Main Street (which was expanded in 1902 and 1907). The school is now closed but remains Category C listed and some of the buildings been converted to residential use. In the Ordnance Gazetteer of Scotland (1892–1896), Winchburgh is described:

Winchburgh, a village in Kirkliston Parish, Linlithgowshire, 11 3/4 miles [19 km] W of Edinburgh. It has a station on the North British Railway, a Post Office with money order and savings bank departments, an Established mission church (opened 1891) and a public school. Pop. (1881) 115, (1891) 424.

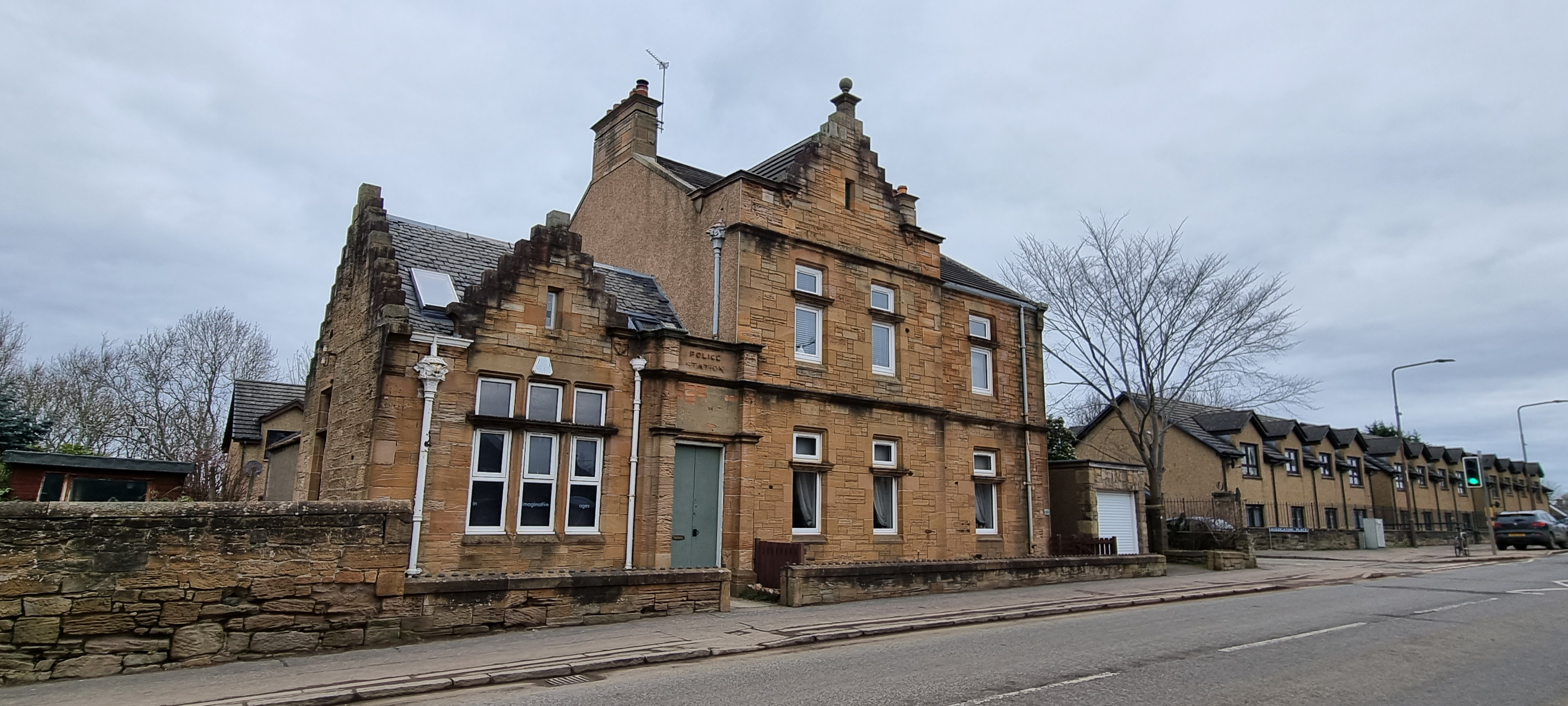
The old police station, built 1904

In 1904, a police station in ashlar stone was built. After the police station was closed, the building became a pharmacy but has since been converted to residential use. In 2000, a war memorial was erected in Winchburgh for those from the area who had lost their lives in the First World War and Second World War.

The early 21st century has seen the construction of several new private housing estates on the periphery of the village towards Auldcathie. The developments are being built to the design of a 'masterplan' with the aim to expand Winchburgh into a new town. The plan incorporates ideas relating to the '20-minute Neighbourhood' concept. The total expansion is estimated at £1 billion, with some 3,800 new homes in the area to allow the village to achieve 'town status'. In August 2022, plans were lodged to create a new marina, alongside a new public park 'Daisy Park' as part of the new town's masterplan, to be built on the site of the historic brickworks. Also, in 2022, a new £16 million Winchburgh Sport & Wellbeing Hub opened. In October 2024, a new £35 million waste water treatment works was officially opened in Winchburgh.

== Economy ==
There are a number of amenities in the town of Winchburgh including a grocery store, several takeaway food shops, several convenience stores, butcher shop and deli, pharmacy, doctor's surgery, post office, community centre. The Tally Ho pub and beer garden, a bowling club and there are also several places of worship in the town.

Housing Includes 19th century miner's cottages, council housing built in the 1950s, several new housing developments, sheltered housing and a care home for the elderly.

== Community facilities ==
Winchburgh Sport & Wellbeing Hub is a local public leisure facility that includes a gymnasium and a swimming pool.

Auldcathie District Park is a local park.

Community groups include Winchburgh Growers and a local scout group.

== Education ==
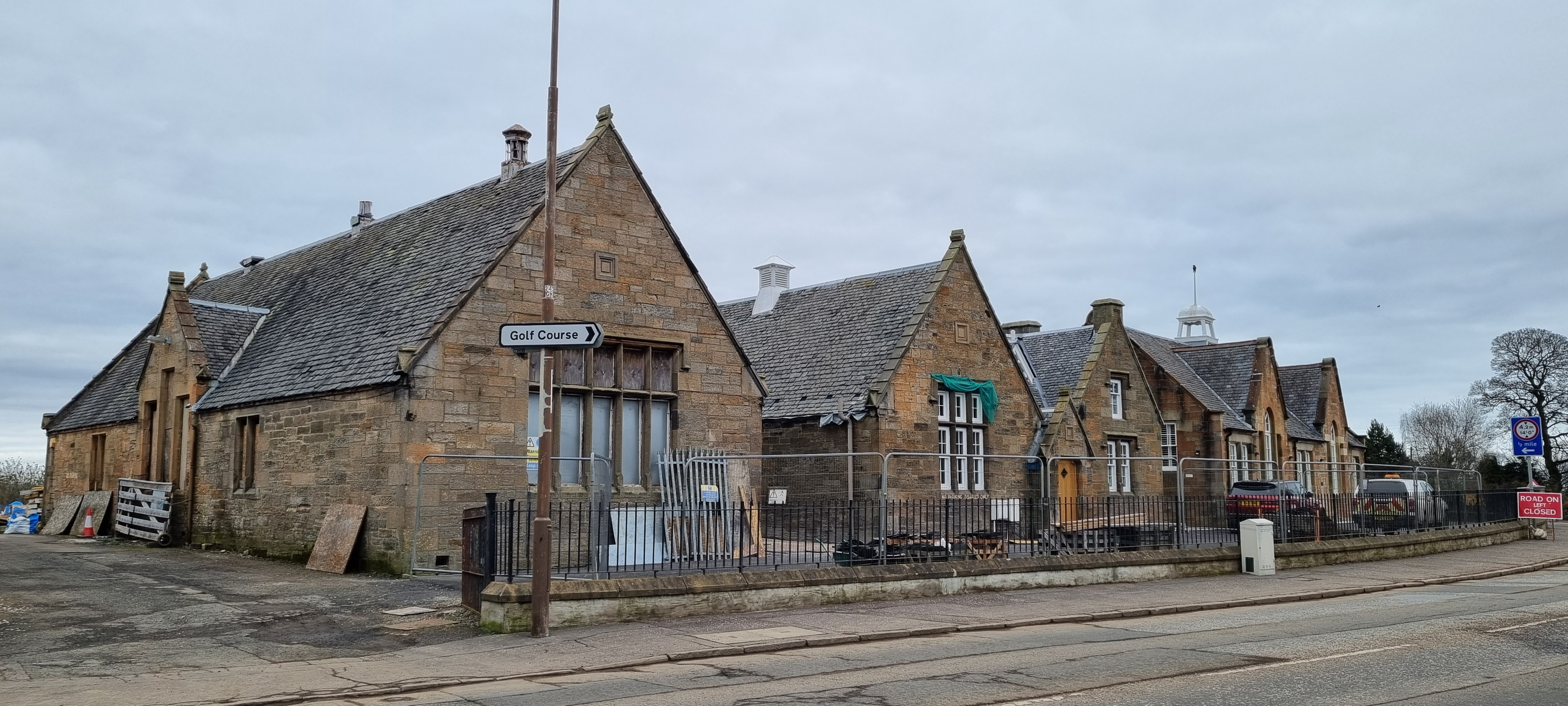
The old school buildings in Winchburgh

Winchburgh has two secondary schools, three primary schools and three Early Learning and Childcare (ELC) Nurseries for children below school age.

Holy Family Primary School serves Roman Catholic pre-secondary school children, whereas Winchburgh Primary is a non-denominational school. Both of these are state run schools. A non-denominational school, Hawkhill Primary, in the east of the town, opened for pupils in August 2025.

Until August 2022, Secondary School aged children mostly attend schools in neighbouring Linlithgow, Livingston, Queensferry and Broxburn. To alleviate overcrowding in Linlithgow Academy and to allow for the growth of Winchburgh into a new town, two new academies have been built. Winchburgh Academy opened for pupils in August 2022. The Academy takes in pupils from Winchburgh Primary and other local areas. A second academy, Sinclair Academy takes pupils from Holy Family Primary and other Catholic primary schools in surrounding areas and opened to pupils in August 2023.

== Transport ==
=== Road ===
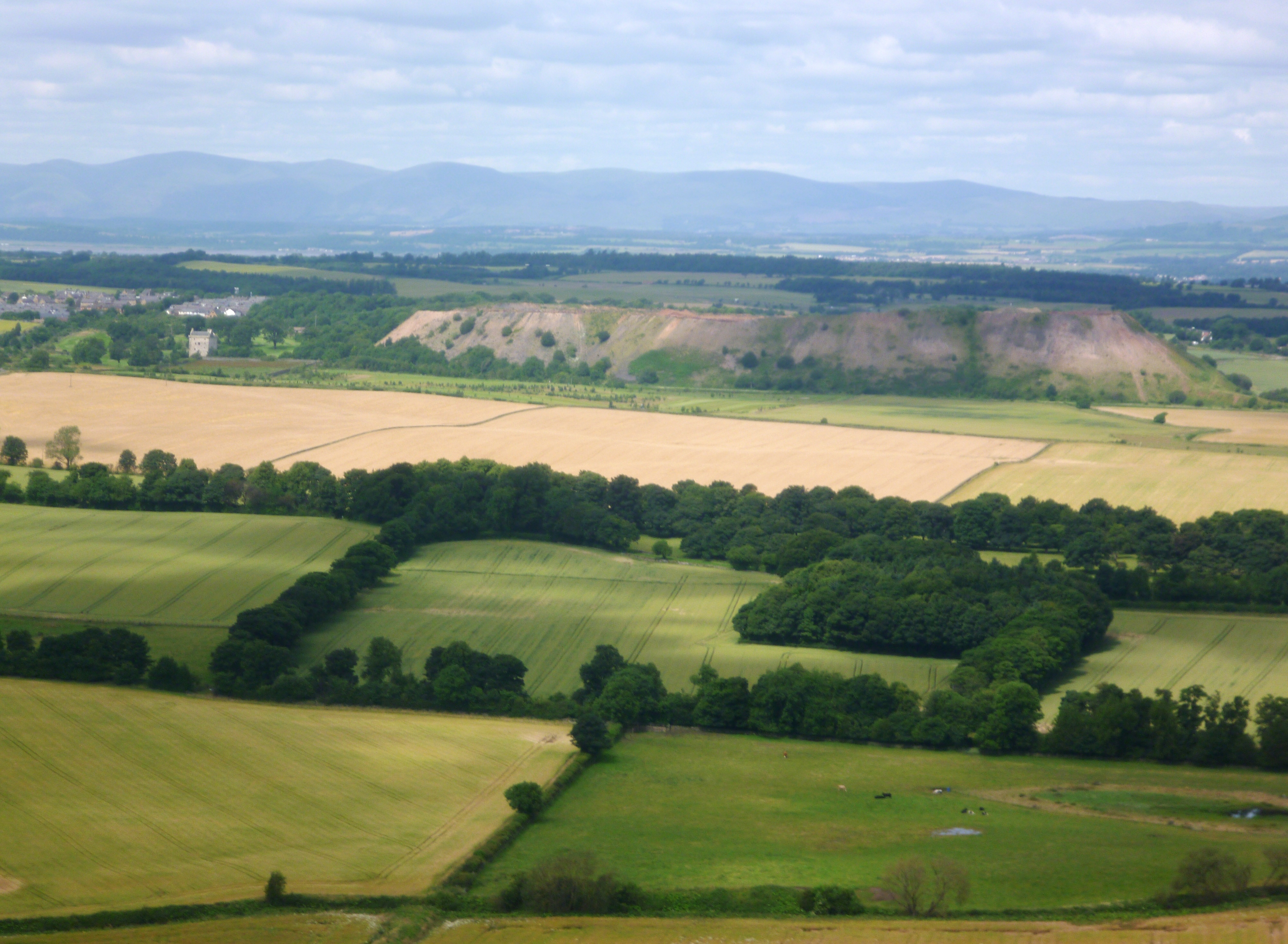
The Niddry Bing at Winchburgh; one of several large shale bings in West Lothian.

The main road through Winchburgh is the B9080 road, which meets the B8020 road (Niddry road) that curvers around the western side of the Niddry bing. The M9 motorway passes to the north of Winchburgh. In April 2022 work began to create a new junction to join Winchburgh to the motorway at an estimated cost of £40 million. In February 2023, the northbound junction 1B opened for local access.

There are regular scheduled buses to and from surrounding places including Edinburgh, Linlithgow, Falkirk, South Queensferry and Broxburn.

The town is served by 4 main bus services operated one each by McGill's Scotland East and Lothian Country:

X38 - Edinburgh - Newbridge - Kirkliston - Winchburgh - Linlithgow - Falkirk (McGill's)

X19 - Edinburgh - Newbridge - Kirkliston - Winchburgh (Lothian Country)

72 - Winchburgh - Broxburn - Livingston - Whitburn - Fauldhouse (Lothian Country)

N43 - Edinburgh - Queensferry - Winchburgh - Broxburn - Dechmont (Lothian Country Night Service)

=== Rail ===
The mainline railway between Edinburgh and Glasgow Queen Street goes through the Winchburgh Tunnel, under the town. Construction of the tunnel began in 1939 and it has been in operation since 1842. The tunnel is 367 yards (336 m) long and 20 feet (6 m) high.

Until it was closed in 1930, there was a passenger station at the north end of the tunnel. The construction of the Winchburgh Tunnel was supervised by the noted Scottish Civil Engineer, John Gibb. West Lothian Council have been promoting a plan to reopen the station as the town grows. In June 2022, it was reported that a commitment to create a new railway station was still part of the new town's plans. In October 2025, the new station was given planning permission though funding and construction are still to take place.

=== Winchburgh and the Union Canal ===
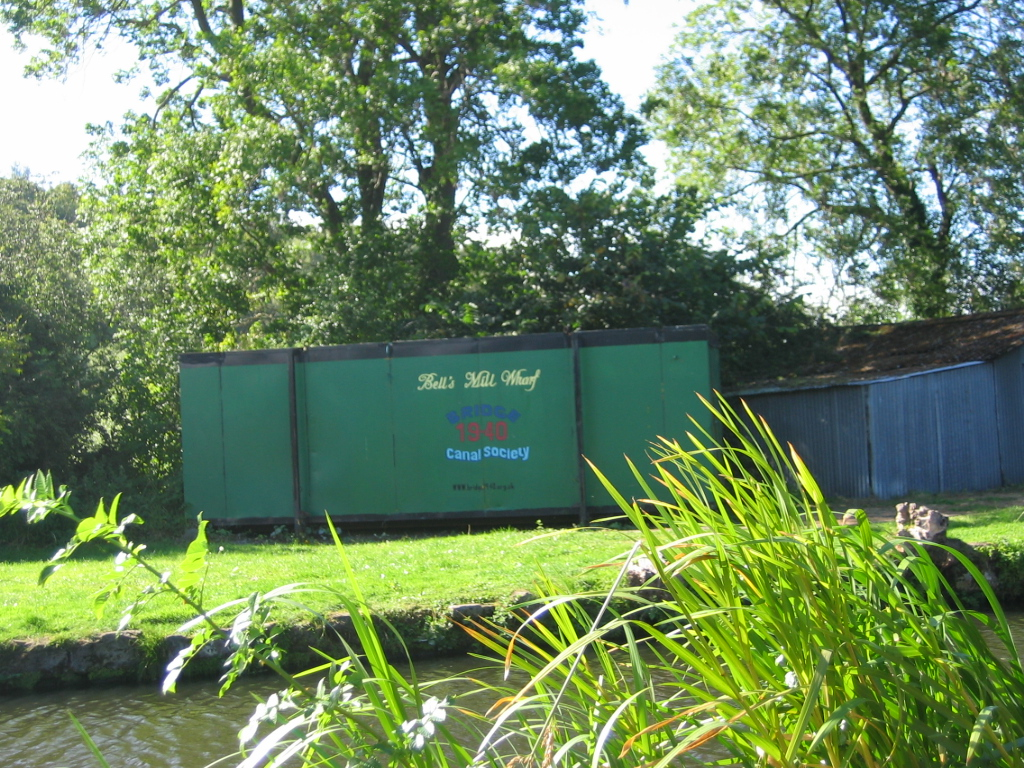
Bell's Mill Wharf, base of 19-40 Union Canal Society

The Union Canal passes through Winchburgh.

The canal no longer operates as a transport link, but is now used for fishing, magnet fishing and some leisure boating. It has a towpath previously used by the horses which drew canal bargess and which is now used as a footpath, the foot paths are popular places for dog walkers, bikers, runners and walkers

The Bridge 19-40 Canal Society (a non-profit) has a base at Winchburgh on the canal, and it operates seasonal boat trips departing from Port Buchan located in neighbouring Broxburn on West Main Street.

== Sport ==
Niddrie Castle Golf Club has an 18-hole, 5,914 yards (5,408 m) long, par 70 golf course, located in and around the grounds of the historic Niddry Castle. The club was established in 1926.

Winchburgh Bowling Club was established in 1913 by local miners and the clubhouse has a 150-capacity function room for social occasions, such as weddings.

In July 2007, parents from local schools formed a boys' football team, taking the name of the former Winchburgh Albion, which had folded in the 1970s. This evolved over the next decade and there now exists multiple girls, boys and joint underage teams registered with the SFA under the banner of the Winchburgh Albion Youth Football Club.

The original Winchburgh Albion FC had produced several senior football players, including Willie Thornton who had a long career with Rangers as player and later, assistant manager, after managing Dundee and Partick Thistle. John Gorman is another former Winchburgh player; he started his senior career with Celtic, before going on have playing success with Carlisle, Tottenham Hotspur and as a coach with several clubs, including his present role at MK Dons. He was also assistant manager of the England international team from 1996 to 1999, under the management of Glenn Hoddle.

In November 2021 the 2012 boys football team broke away from Winchburgh Albion YFC to form Winchburgh Violets Youth Football Club. The Violets play in the West Lothian Soccer Development Association league, and play their home games at the newly opened Winchburgh Sport and Wellbeing Hub.

== See also ==
- List of places in West Lothian
