= John Cunningham (bishop) =

Scottish bishop (1938–2021)

The Right Reverend John Cunningham
- Bishop Emeritus of Galloway
- Church: Roman Catholic Church
- Diocese: Galloway
- Appointed: 7 April 2004
- Term ended: 22 November 2014
- Predecessor: Maurice Taylor
- Successor: William Nolan

Orders
- Ordination: 29 June 1961 by James Black
- Consecration: 28 May 2004 by Keith O'Brien

Personal details
- Born: 22 February 1938 Paisley, Renfrewshire, Scotland
- Died: 1 December 2021 (aged 83) Greenock, Scotland
- Motto: Congregare in Unum

John Cunningham (22 February 1938 – 1 December 2021) was a Roman Catholic prelate who served as Bishop of Galloway from 2004 to 2014.

== Biography ==
Cunningham was born in Paisley, Renfrewshire, Scotland, on 22 February 1938. He was educated at St Mary's College, Blairs and St. Peter's Seminary, Cardross. Later he was a student of the Scots College, Rome from where he attended the Pontifical Gregorian University.

He was ordained to the priesthood on 29 June 1961. From 1967 to 1981, he was extramural professor of Canon Law at St Peter's College, Glasgow. He was parish priest at St Patrick's, Greenock from 1992 to 2004 and was appointed Papal Chaplain in 1994. From 1997 to 2004 he was Vicar General of the Diocese of Paisley. He was made a Prelate of Honour in 1999.

On the day Maurice Taylor retired on 7 April 2004, Cunningham was appointed the Bishop of the Diocese of Galloway by the Holy See. He was consecrated to the Episcopate on 28 May 2004, the principal consecrator being Cardinal Keith O'Brien, Archbishop of St Andrews and Edinburgh with co-consecrating bishops Maurice Taylor, Bishop Emeritus of Galloway and John Mone, Bishop of Paisley.

Cunningham retired on 22 November 2014 when Pope Francis' appointment of William Nolan as his successor was announced. He died on 1 December 2021, at the age of 83.

Catholic Church titles
Preceded by Maurice Taylor	Bishop of Galloway; 2004–2014	Succeeded by William Nolan
