= Joseph McGee (bishop) =

Scottish Roman Catholic clergyman

The Right Reverend Joseph Michael McGee
- Bishop Emeritus of Galloway
- Church: Roman Catholic Church
- Appointed: 19 July 1952
- Term ended: 4 April 1981
- Predecessor: William Mellon
- Successor: Maurice Taylor

Orders
- Ordination: 25 May 1929
- Consecration: 11 Nov 1952 by William Godfrey

Personal details
- Born: 13 December 1904 Crieff, Perthshire
- Died: 5 March 1983 (aged 78) Prestwick, Ayrshire

Joseph Michael McGee (13 December 1904 – 4 April 1983) was a Scottish Roman Catholic clergyman who served as the Bishop of Galloway from 1952 to 1981.

== Life ==
Born in the parish of Monzievaird and Strowan, Perthshire, Scotland on 13 December 1904, he was ordained to the priesthood on 25 May 1929. He was appointed the Bishop of the Diocese of Galloway by the Holy See on 19 July 1952, and consecrated to the Episcopate on 11 November 1952. The principal consecrator was Cardinal William Godfrey, Archbishop of Westminster, and the principal co-consecrators were Bishop James Donald Scanlan of Dunkeld (later Archbishop of Glasgow) and Bishop Edward Wilson Douglas of Motherwell. He attended all four sessions of the Second Vatican Council from 1962 to 1965.

He retired on 4 April 1981 and assumed the title Bishop Emeritus of Galloway. He died on 5 March 1983, aged 78.

Catholic Church titles
Preceded by William Henry Mellon	Bishop of Galloway; 1952–1981	Succeeded by Maurice Taylor
