= Maurice Taylor (bishop) =

British Roman Catholic bishop (1926–2023)

The Right Reverend Maurice Taylor
- Bishop Emeritus of Galloway
- Church: Catholic Church
- Archdiocese: St Andrews and Edinburgh
- Diocese: Galloway
- Appointed: 4 April 1981
- Term ended: 7 April 2004
- Predecessor: Joseph McGee
- Successor: John Cunningham
- Previous posts: Rector of the Royal Scots College, Valladolid (1965–1974)

Orders
- Ordination: 2 July 1950 by Eliseu van der Weijer
- Consecration: 9 June 1981 by Gordon Gray

Personal details
- Born: 5 May 1926 Hamilton, Lanarkshire, Scotland
- Died: 14 June 2023 (aged 97) Kilmarnock, East Ayrshire, Scotland
- Education: Our Lady's High School, Motherwell; St Aloysius' College, Glasgow
- Alma mater: Blairs College; Pontifical Scots College
- Motto: Ambula coram Deo

Maurice Taylor (5 May 1926 – 14 June 2023) was a British Catholic prelate who served as Bishop of Galloway from 1981 until 2004.

== Early life ==
Born in Hamilton, Lanarkshire, he attended St Cuthbert's Primary, Burnbank, before going on to St. Aloysius' College, Glasgow, and, later, Our Lady's High School, Motherwell. He studied philosophy at Blairs College, Kincardineshire, from 1942 to 1944 and then served in the Royal Army Medical Corps, at home, in India and in Egypt. He attended the Pontifical Scots College, Rome from 1947 to 1951, studying theology at the Gregorian University and being ordained a priest in Rome on 2 July 1950. After a year as assistant priest in St Bartholomew's, Coatbridge, he returned to Rome in 1952 where he took his doctorate in theology in 1954. For 10 years from August 1955 he taught philosophy and theology at St Peter's College, Cardross.

== Career ==
From 1965 until 1974 he was rector of the Royal Scots College, Valladolid, Spain. He was ordained Bishop of Galloway by Cardinal Gordon Gray on 9 June 1981. For more than ten years he represented Scotland on the Episcopal Board of the International Commission on English in the Liturgy (ICEL), and was its chairman from 1997 until 2002. He retired as bishop in 2004 and was succeeded by John Cunningham.

In 2013, it was revealed that a diocesan priest, Paul Moore, had confessed to Taylor that he sexually abused a boy the year prior and that Taylor opted to send Moore to a treatment centre in Toronto and to Fort Augustus Abbey in the Highlands instead of turning him into the authorities. Taylor later cooperated during Moore's trial, which resulted in a conviction in 2018. Taylor died on 14 June 2023, at the age of 97.

Catholic Church titles
Preceded by Joseph Michael McGee	Bishop of Galloway; 1981–2004	Succeeded by John Cunningham
