= List of Old Truronians =

Old Truronians is the name used to refer to people educated at Truro School, a mixed private boarding school located in the city of Truro, Cornwall, and its preparatory school, Truro Prep (formerly called Treliske School). The "Truro Wesleyan Middle Class College" (also referred to as Truro College) was founded by Wesleyan Methodists in 1880. The school moved to its current location, on top of Trennick Hill, in 1882. The name was changed to Truro School in 1931, when it was considered that it was "pretentious...to claim the style of 'College' if its pupils are for the most part below the age of 18". Girls were admitted into the sixth form in 1976, and the school became fully co-educational in 1990. In 2005, a history of the school entitled High on the Hill was produced by Joanna Wood to commemorate its 125th anniversary.

The name "Old Truronians" also refers to those educated at the historic Truro Cathedral School, founded in the 16th century and closed in 1982.

== Notable former pupils ==
=== Academics ===
- John Curtice, psephologist and Professor of Politics at the University of Strathclyde.

=== Armed forces ===
- Peter King, World War II Commando and Military Cross recipient.

=== Arts and media ===
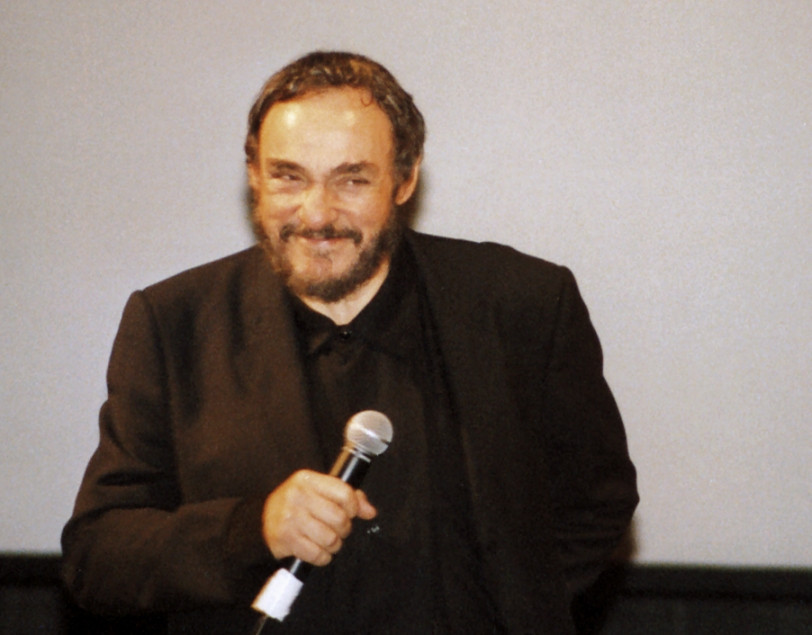
John Rhys-Davies

- Ros Atkins, BBC journalist and main presenter of Outside Source on BBC World News channel and the BBC World Service
- James Hawes, British television director
- John Rhys-Davies (1953–1963), actor whose films include The Lord of the Rings and Raiders of the Lost Ark
- Robert Shaw (1939–1945), actor and novelist whose films include From Russia with Love, The Sting and Jaws
- Nigel Terry (1956–1963), Shakespearean actor whose films include Excalibur, The Lion in Winter and Troy
- Lawrence Ng, Hong Kong actor

=== Business and industry ===
- Geoffrey Healey, car designer
- Paul Myners (1956–66), businessman and Life Peer (Also listed under Politics)
- Patrick Vallance, clinical pharmacologist and the Chief Scientific Adviser to the UK government (2018-)

=== Music ===
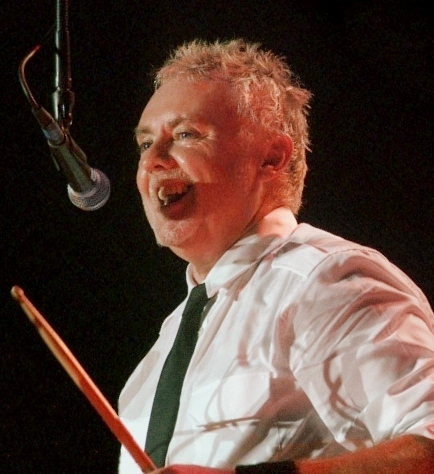
Roger Taylor

- Derek Holman (1942–48), conductor, organist and composer
- Benjamin Luxon (1948–1955), opera singer
- Tom Middleton (1982–89), recording artist, music producer, remixer and DJ
- Alan Opie (1956–1963), opera singer
- Roger Taylor (1960–1968), drummer and vocalist for art rock group Queen
- Luke Vibert (1984–1989), musician and recording artist within the electronica genre

=== Politics, law and religion ===
- George Eustice (1982–87), Conservative MP (Camborne and Redruth, 2010–)
- Julia Goldsworthy (1990–97), Liberal Democrat MP (Falmouth and Camborne, 2005–2010)
- Joseph Hunkin (1896–1903); Bishop of Truro
- Ray Jones (born 1934), Anglican priest and Royal Navy chaplain
- Sir Archibald Pellow Marshall (1911–17), High Court Judge (presided over the trial of Stephen Ward in 1963)
- David Menhennet (1928–2016), 10th Librarian of the House of Commons Library
- Paul Myners (1956–66), businessman and Life Peer (Also listed under Business)
- Lucy Nethsingha, Leader of Cambridgeshire County Council (2021-), MEP for the East of England (2019–2020).
- David Penhaligon (1953–1961), Liberal MP (Truro and St Austell, 1974–1986)
- Mark Prisk (1973–1980), Conservative MP (Hertford and Stortford, 2001–2019)
- Matthew Taylor (Treliske School 1971–72), Liberal Democrat MP (Truro and St Austell, 1987–2010)
- Nigel Haywood (1966–1973) (Governor of the Falkland Islands since 2010)

=== Sport ===
- Michael Adams (1983–1990), Chess Grandmaster
- Sir Ben Ainslie (1985–1993), Olympic sailor and four times gold medallist
- Fran Brown, paraclimber and paratriathlete
- Norman Croucher (1952–53), double amputee mountain climber
- William Deary, British sabre fencer
- Laura Harper (1995–2000), England international cricketer
- Finn Hawkins, British windsurfer
- John Kendall-Carpenter, England international rugby union captain
- Michael Munday (1995–2002), cricketer for Somerset CCC
- Charlie Shreck (1991–1996), cricketer for Nottinghamshire CCC
- Talan Skeels-Piggins (1982–1989), Paralympic alpine skier (Vancouver 2010)
- Brett Smitheram (CO97), UK and World Scrabble Champion.
- Rob Thirlby (1989–1992), England international rugby sevens player
