= Nick St Aubyn =

British politician

Member of Parliament for Guildford
- In office 1 May 1997 – 14 May 2001
- Preceded by: David Howell
- Succeeded by: Sue Doughty

Personal details
- Born: 19 November 1955 (age 70)
- Party: Conservative
- Education: Trinity College, Oxford

Nicholas Francis St Aubyn (born 19 November 1955) is a Conservative Party politician in the United Kingdom.

== Early life ==
St Aubyn is the younger son of the Hon. Piers St Aubyn MC by his marriage to Mary Bailey-Southwell, and a grandson of Baron St Levan. He went to Eton College, and Trinity College, Oxford, where he was a member of the Oxford University Liberal Club and in the aftermath of the 1975 referendum on UK EEC-membership, President of the Young European Federalists. He was awarded a Bachelor of Arts (BA) degree in PPE in 1977; the BA was later promoted to a Master of Arts (MA Oxon) degree. Before Oxford, he lived and worked in Soweto, South Africa, through a placement with the Project Trust.

He worked as a Loan Officer for Morgan Guaranty Trust from 1977 to 1981. He was the head of the London office of Morgan Futures from 1981 to 1984, then the head of the Sterling and Arbitrage Swaps Desk from 1984 to 1986. He was Vice President of Kleinwort Benson Cross Finance from 1986 to 1987. He worked for American International Group's Financial Products Division from 1987 to 1989. From 1989 to 1993, he was Chairman of Gemini Ltd. From 1993 to 1997, he was Chairman of Fitzroy Joinery Ltd in Plymouth.

== Political career ==
From 1982 to 1986, St Aubyn was a Conservative councillor on Westminster City Council, representing Little Venice ward. He then fought the Truro by-election in March 1987 following the death of David Penhaligon, when Matthew Taylor comfortably held the seat for the Liberals. He stood again in Truro at the 1987 general election, more than halving the Liberal majority, but slipped back at the 1992 general election.

Following the retirement of long-serving Conservative MP and former minister David Howell, St Aubyn was selected as Conservative candidate for Guildford in preparation for the 1997 general election. Withstanding the national landslide against his party, he held the seat with a reduced majority over the Liberal Democrats, but at the 2001 election he narrowly lost the seat to the Liberal Democrat Sue Doughty. While in parliament, he served on the Education Select Committee and was Parliamentary Private Secretary to Michael Portillo. He did not contest the 2005 election, when Anne Milton narrowly retook the seat for the Conservatives.

== Personal life ==
St Aubyn married Jane Brooks on 26 April 1980 and they have two sons (Henry and Edward) and three daughters (Kitty, Alice and Camilla). His older brother inherited the title Lord St Levan from their uncle the 4th Baron St Levan.

== Books ==
- Nick St Aubyn, Custom of the County (2010)

Parliament of the United Kingdom
Preceded by David Howell	Member of Parliament for Guildford; 1997–2001	Succeeded by Sue Doughty
