= Zöe Franklin =

British politician

Zöe Franklin MP
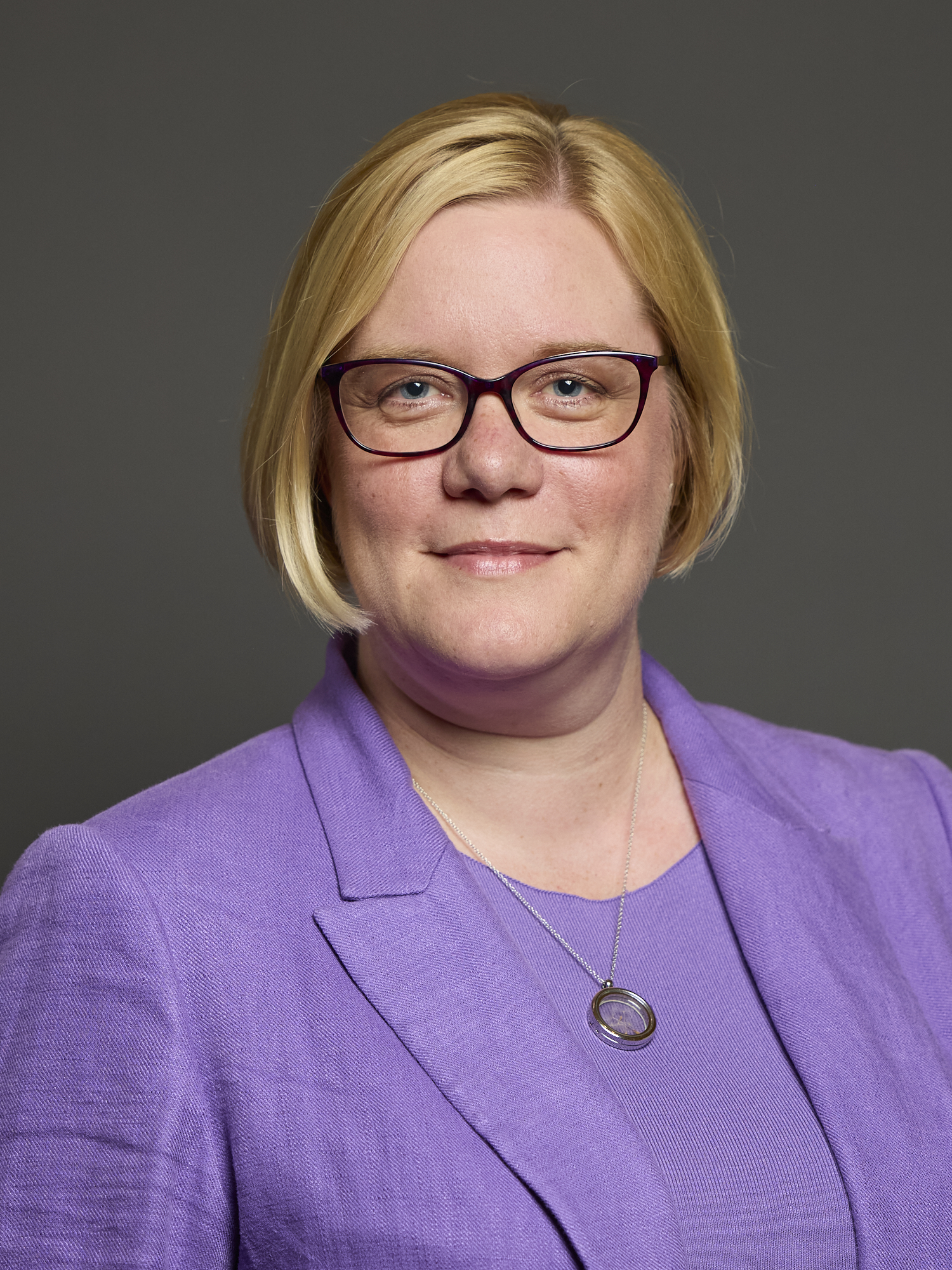
- Official portrait, 2024

Member of Parliament for Guildford
- Incumbent
- Assumed office 4 July 2024
- Preceded by: Angela Richardson
- Majority: 8,429 (17.5%)

Liberal Democrat spokesperson for Local Government
- Incumbent
- Assumed office 1 October 2025
- Leader: Ed Davey
- Preceded by: Vikki Slade

Personal details
- Born: 1 June 1981 (age 45) Ascot, England
- Party: Liberal Democrats
- Children: 2
- Education: University of Surrey (BMus); University of Southampton (MMus)

Zöe Louise Franklin (born 1 June 1981) is a British Liberal Democrat politician who has been Member of Parliament (MP) for Guildford since 2024.

== Early life ==
Franklin was born in Ascot, Berkshire and started school in Bodmin before her family moved to Farnham aged 7. She attended Hale Middle School and Farnham Heath End School before travelling to Alton College to complete her A-levels.

In 1999 Franklin moved to Guildford to study music (BMus) at University of Surrey graduating in 2002. In 2005 she graduated from University of Southampton with a Master of Musicology (MMus).

Franklin has had a varied career. After completing her masters she worked in the creative sector initially for Surrey County Arts and then the educational publishers Rhinegold Education Ltd.

She has described in interviews how it was there that she experienced a “quarter-life crisis” noting that she realised she wanted to do more to help people which led her to move into politics, becoming Director of the Liberal Democrat Christian Forum.

== Political career ==
Franklin's political career began in May 2007 when she became the temporary director of the Liberal Democrat Christian Forum, in a five-month maternity cover appointment.

From October 2008 to August 2010, Franklin served as a Constituency Organiser for the Guildford Liberal Democrats.

In 2008, Franklin stood for election to Guildford Borough as councillor for Stoke ward (now Bellfields and Slyfield) in a by-election. She won with 26.6 percent of the vote (more than double her closest rival) and continued as councillor until 2015 when she stood down.

During her time as a councillor, Franklin’s focus on partnership working saw her appointed a member of the Home-Start Guildford board of trustees between May 2009 and April 2015, as well as becoming a member of the grants panel of Guildford Philanthropy & Guildford Local Committee.

Franklin then took a short hiatus from politics during which time she was the manager of East Horsley Village Hall and its charity from 2014-17.

Franklin was initially selected for Guildford in the 2017 general election, coming second to Anne Milton, who had held the seat since taking it from the Liberal Democrats in 2005. She stood for a second time in 2019, achieving a 12.5-per-cent swing to the Lib Dems against the backdrop of a substantial Conservative majority nationally.

Franklin won the seat at the 2024 general election with an 11.7-per-cent swing, achieving 47.5 per cent of the vote and a majority of 8,429, a gain for the Liberal Democrats by beating Angela Richardson.

Franklin is the fourth successive woman to hold the seat and only the second non-Conservative MP, following in the footsteps of Sue Doughty who was the Liberal Democrat MP from 2001-5.

Franklin was elected as a member of the Culture, Media and Sport Select Committee on 21 October 2024.

Following the September 2025 Liberal Democrat Conference in Bournemouth, Franklin joined the frontbench in a reshuffle, replacing Vikki Slade as the Liberal Democrat Spokesperson for Local Government.

Franklin is also Chair of the Faith and Society All Party Parliamentary Group has been a member of the Ecclesiastical Committee since November 2024.

== Personal life ==
Franklin lives in Guildford with her husband Chris and their two children.

Parliament of the United Kingdom
| Preceded by Angela Richardson | Member of Parliament for Guildford; 2024–present | Incumbent |
