= Doris Ansari =

English politician (1941–2025)

Doris Ansari OBE JP

Chairman of Cornwall County Council
- In office 2005 – 31 March 2009
- Succeeded by: Office abolished

Leader of the Opposition, Cornwall Council
- In office 15 June 2009 – May 2011
- Preceded by: Position established

Councillor for Truro Tregolls
- In office 4 June 2009 – 2 May 2013
- Preceded by: Division created
- Succeeded by: Loic Rich

Member of Cornwall County Council
- In office 1980 – 31 March 2009

Member of Carrick District Council
- In office 1973 – 1 April 2009
- Succeeded by: Council abolished

Member of Truro City Council
- In office 1971 – by 2013

Personal details
- Born: Doris Martyna Ashurst; 18 May 1941 Ince-in-Makerfield, Lancashire, England
- Died: 11 June 2025 (aged 84) St Austell, Cornwall, England
- Party: Liberal Democrats
- Other political affiliations: Liberal; SDP–Liberal Alliance
- Spouse: Asadullah Ansari (m. 1960)
- Children: 3
- Occupation: Politician

Doris Martyna Ansari OBE JP (née Ashurst; 18 May 1941 – 11 June 2025) was a Liberal Democrat politician from Cornwall and Chairman of Cornwall County Council from 2005 to 2009. She was then opposition leader on Cornwall Council from 2009 until she stood down in 2011.

== Early life ==
As Doris Ashurst, Ansari was born in Ince-in-Makerfield, Lancashire, on 18 May 1941, the daughter of John Ashurst and his wife Maggie Birch. In 1960, she married Asadullah Ansari in Farnworth. By 1962, they were living in Redruth, Cornwall, where their three children were born in the 1960s.

== Political career ==
=== Cornish politics ===
Ansari was first elected to Truro City Council in 1971, and to Carrick District Council when it was formed in 1973, standing as a Liberal. In 1976, Ansari was narrowly defeated by Kingsley Smith in the election to be deputy mayor of Truro. This was described as "a direct snub" by another councillor due to the custom of electing "the senior councillor in line for the honour", which was Ansari, and because she had topped the poll in the recent elections to the council. This was compounded by the fact that the deputy mayor would be the automatic choice for mayor during the city's centenary celebrations in 1977, when a visit by Queen Elizabeth II was expected. Ansari was instead made mayor of Truro in 1978, with her husband Asad Ansari as her consort. During her tenure, she oversaw and signed Truro's twinning agreement with Morlaix, Brittany, as well as receiving Margaret Thatcher during her visit to the city in the run-up to the 1979 general election.

She was elected to Cornwall County Council in 1980. In the 1983 elections, Ansari stood as a Liberal Alliance candidate for seats on Truro City Council (in the Truro Boscawen ward), Carrick District Council (in the Truro Boscawen ward), and Cornwall County Council (in a by-election for the Truro West ward). She was successful in all three elections, polling 2202 votes in the county council contest.

In 1987, while she was chair of Cornwall County Council's planning and employment committee, Ansari was shortlisted to be the Liberal candidate at the Truro by-election after the death of incumbent Liberal MP David Penhaligon; Matthew Taylor was eventually selected as the candidate and won the by-election.

She was the County Council's vice-chair from 1995 to 1997 and its chair from 2005 until its abolition in 2009. Ansari also held the post of Portfolio Holder for Education for a period. She was criticised for not including Cornish issues in the education curriculum, which she said would be "dangerous" and "put Cornwall on the road to the Balkans". Ansari was awarded an OBE in the 2000 New Year Honours for services to the community in Cornwall.

After the establishment of the unitary Cornwall Council, Ansari was elected by the Truro Tregolls division and became opposition leader and leader of the Liberal Democrats on the council from 2009 to 2011. In April 2011, she announced she would be standing down as Liberal Democrat leader having been in local government for 40 years. She did not contest the 2013 election, being succeeded by Loic Rich. By the time of her retirement, Ansari was one of the longest serving members of the council. She is not listed among Truro City Council members on the council website as of May 2025.

=== Regional and national politics ===
Ansari was a member on several regional and national bodies throughout her career including the South West Regional Arts Council, the Milk and Dairies Tribunal, and the South West Rural Development Agency.

=== European politics ===
In 2003 and 2004, Ansari chaired the Committee on Social Cohesion of the Congress of Local and Regional Authorities of the Council of Europe and was a rapporteur for Congress reports. She was also a British representative to the Chamber of Regions at its 11th session in 2004.

Ansari was made a UK delegate to the European Committee of the Regions from 2008 to fill seats left vacant during the term of office which ended in 2010. She was renominated by the Local Government Association for the 2010–2015 term, but served only until 2013. She was Vice-President of the ALDE Group on the Committee between 2012 and 2013.

== Electoral history ==
=== 2009 Cornwall Council election ===
2009 election: Truro Tregolls
Party	Candidate	Votes	%	±%
Liberal Democrats	Doris Ansari	531	41.2	
Conservative	Jacqui Butler	348	27.0	
Mebyon Kernow	Loic Rich	293	22.7	
Green	Lindsay Southcombe	108	8.4	
Majority		183	14.2	
Majority		10	0.8	
Turnout		1290	33.2	
Liberal Democrats win (new seat)				

=== 1979 Carrick District Council election ===
1979 election: Moresk
Party	Candidate	Votes	%	±%
Conservative	G. Smitherman	Unopposed		
Liberal	D. Ansari	Unopposed		
Majority		N/A		
Total votes		N/A		
Turnout		N/A		
Conservative win (new seat)				
Liberal win (new seat)				
