= 2019 Chesterfield Borough Council election =

2019 UK local government election

- 2 May 2019

All 48 seats to Chesterfield Borough Council 25 seats needed for a majority

	First party	Second party	Third party
Party	Labour	Liberal Democrats	Independent
Last election	38 seats, 44.3%	9 seats, 23.6%	0 seats, 3.9%
Seats won	28	17	3
Seat change	▼10	▲8	▲3
Popular vote	25,538	22,793	3,358
Percentage	43.5%	38.9%	5.7%
Swing	▼0.8%	▲15.3%	▲1.8%
- Winner of each seat at the 2019 Chesterfield Borough Council election
Council control before election
Labour
Council control after election
Labour

Elections to Chesterfield Borough Council in Derbyshire, England were held on 2 May 2019.

== Summary ==
=== Election result ===
2019 Chesterfield Borough Council election
Party	Candidates	Seats	Gains	Losses	Net gain/loss	Seats %	Votes %	Votes	+/−
Labour	48	28	0	10	▼10	58.3	43.5	25,538	–0.8
Liberal Democrats	48	17	8	0	▲8	35.4	38.9	22,793	+15.3
Independent	7	3	3	0	▲3	6.3	5.7	3,358	+1.8
Conservative	26	0	0	0	Steady	0.0	9.1	5,360	–9.0
Green	2	0	0	0	Steady	0.0	1.1	641	N/A
UKIP	3	0	0	1	▼1	0.0	1.1	634	–7.7
Chesterfield Independents	2	0	0	0	Steady	0.0	0.6	335	N/A

== Ward results ==
=== Barrow Hill and New Whittington ===
Barrow Hill and New Whittington
Party	Candidate	Votes	%	±%
Liberal Democrats	Barry Bingham	914	64.6	
Liberal Democrats	Kelly Thornton	685	48.4	
Liberal Democrats	Paul Holmes	675	47.7	
Labour	Lisa-Marie Derbyshire	273	19.3	
Labour	Susan Bean	256	18.1	
Labour	John Flint	249	17.6	
UKIP	John Daramy	232	16.4	
UKIP	Robert Warwick	226	16.0	
Conservative	Oliver Scheidt	119	8.4	
Conservative	Linda Rowley	107	7.6	
Conservative	Adam Parrish	92	6.5	
Majority		402	28.4	
Registered electors		4,310		
Turnout		1,418	32.9	
Rejected ballots		4	0.3	
Liberal Democrats hold				
Liberal Democrats gain from Labour				
Liberal Democrats gain from UKIP				

=== Brimington North ===
Brimington North
Party	Candidate	Votes	%	±%
Labour	Terence Gilby	430	65.5	
Labour	Susan Perkins	395	60.2	
Liberal Democrats	Claire Lewis	142	21.6	
Liberal Democrats	Jon Cayzer	122	18.6	
Conservative	Simon Temperton	93	14.2	
Majority		253	38.6	
Registered electors		3,114		
Turnout		692	22.2	
Rejected ballots		36	5.2	
Labour hold				
Labour hold				

=== Brimington South ===
Brimington South
Party	Candidate	Votes	%	±%
Labour	Patricia Gilby	864	64.8	
Labour	Ian Callan	828	62.1	
Labour	Anthony Bellamy	808	60.6	
Liberal Democrats	Jane Collins	278	20.9	
Conservative	Craig Hoyland	259	19.4	
Liberal Democrats	Ian Openshaw	248	18.6	
Liberal Democrats	Russell Eagling	223	16.7	
Majority		530	39.8	
Registered electors		4,733		
Turnout		1,378	29.1	
Rejected ballots		45	3.3	
Labour hold				
Labour hold				
Labour hold				

=== Brockwell ===
Brockwell
Party	Candidate	Votes	%	±%
Liberal Democrats	Maureen Davenport	1,270	61.1	
Liberal Democrats	Edward Fordham	1,206	58.0	
Liberal Democrats	Katherine Hollingworth	1,149	55.2	
Labour	Stephen Brunt	769	37.0	
Labour	Lesley Whetton	663	31.9	
Labour	Jarrad Keyes	631	30.3	
Conservative	Annetta Woodhead	171	8.2	
Majority		380	18.3	
Registered electors		5,121		
Turnout		2,126	41.5	
Rejected ballots		46	2.2	
Liberal Democrats hold				
Liberal Democrats gain from Labour				
Liberal Democrats gain from Labour				

=== Dunston ===
Dunston
Party	Candidate	Votes	%	±%
Labour	Gordon Simmons	626	57.5	
Labour	Mark Rayner	620	57.0	
Labour	Janice Marriott	616	56.6	
Liberal Democrats	Joanne Favreau	270	24.8	
Liberal Democrats	Jolyon Favreau	258	23.7	
Liberal Democrats	Ronald Satterfitt	253	23.3	
Conservative	Margaret Moss	204	18.8	
Majority		346	31.8	
Registered electors		4,675		
Turnout		1,132	24.2	
Rejected ballots		44	3.9	
Labour hold				
Labour hold				
Labour hold				

=== Hasland ===
Hasland
Party	Candidate	Votes	%	±%
Labour	Michael Brady	892	56.7	
Labour	Amanda Serjeant	780	49.6	
Labour	Stuart Brittain	755	48.0	
Liberal Democrats	Bridget Dunks	368	23.4	
Conservative	Paul Gibbons	354	22.5	
Green	Darren Yates	333	21.2	
Liberal Democrats	Elizabeth Frear	275	17.5	
Liberal Democrats	Dorothy Herring	189	12.0	
Majority		387	24.6	
Registered electors		4,809		
Turnout		1,604	33.4	
Rejected ballots		32	2.0	
Labour hold				
Labour hold				
Labour hold				

=== Hollingwood and Inkersall ===
Hollingwood and Inkersall
Party	Candidate	Votes	%	±%
Independent	Michael Bagshaw	892	56.0	
Independent	Paul Mann	828	52.0	
Independent	Ruth Perry	774	48.6	
Labour	Joanne Barnett	561	35.2	
Labour	Helen Elliott	545	34.2	
Labour	Anthony Hill	462	29.0	
Conservative	Frank Wilkinson	144	9.0	
Liberal Democrats	William Nightingale	87	5.5	
Liberal Democrats	Arron Shutler	65	4.1	
Liberal Democrats	Keith Shutler	54	3.4	
Majority		213	13.4	
Registered electors		5,716		
Turnout		1,606	28.1	
Rejected ballots		14	0.9	
Independent gain from Labour				
Independent gain from Labour				
Independent gain from Labour				

=== Holmebrook ===
Holmebrook
Party	Candidate	Votes	%	±%
Liberal Democrats	Keith Falconer	554	52.0	
Liberal Democrats	Glenys Falconer	525	49.3	
Labour	Ronald Mihaly	472	44.3	
Labour	Gordon McLaren	399	37.5	
Conservative	Richard Woodhead	78	7.3	
Majority		53	5.0	
Registered electors		3,023		
Turnout		1,077	35.6	
Rejected ballots		12	1.1	
Liberal Democrats gain from Labour				
Liberal Democrats gain from Labour				

=== Linacre ===
Linacre
Party	Candidate	Votes	%	±%
Liberal Democrats	Emily Coy	778	62.5	
Liberal Democrats	Peter Barr	733	58.9	
Labour	David Culley	318	25.6	
Labour	Marion Thorpe	292	23.5	
Conservative	Roderick Harrison	174	14.0	
Majority		415	33.4	
Registered electors		3,210		
Turnout		1,265	39.4	
Rejected ballots		21	1.7	
Liberal Democrats hold				
Liberal Democrats hold				

=== Loundsley Green ===
Loundsley Green
Party	Candidate	Votes	%	±%
Labour	Raymond Catt	484	59.0	
Labour	Avis Murphy	471	57.4	
Liberal Democrats	Simon Coy	225	27.4	
Liberal Democrats	Matthew Genn	202	24.6	
Conservative	Sandra Furniss	124	15.1	
Majority		246	30.0	
Registered electors		2,928		
Turnout		852	29.1	
Rejected ballots		32	3.8	
Labour hold				
Labour hold				

=== Lowgates and Woodthorpe ===
Lowgates and Woodthorpe
Party	Candidate	Votes	%	±%
Labour	Lisa Collins	418	46.9	
Labour	Dean Collins	414	46.4	
Liberal Democrats	Paul Jacobs	189	21.2	
Liberal Democrats	Stephen Hartley	185	20.7	
Independent	Joseph Mann	141	15.8	
Conservative	Rhodri Hutchinson	137	15.4	
Independent	Michelle Mann	123	13.8	
Conservative	Malcolm Rowley	104	11.7	
Majority		225	25.2	
Registered electors		3,400		
Turnout		908	26.7	
Rejected ballots		16	1.8	
Labour hold				
Labour hold				

=== Middlecroft and Poolsbrook ===
Middlecroft and Poolsbrook
Party	Candidate	Votes	%	±%
Labour	Barry Dyke	414	48.4	
Labour	Christine Ludlow	377	44.0	
Independent	Dale Denton	302	35.3	
Independent	Cheryl Jackson	298	34.8	
Conservative	Margaret Andrews	92	10.7	
Liberal Democrats	Harry Holloway	59	6.9	
Liberal Democrats	Kevin Maher	55	6.4	
Majority		75	8.8	
Registered electors		3,420		
Turnout		871	25.5	
Rejected ballots		15	1.7	
Labour hold				
Labour hold				

=== Moor ===
Moor
Party	Candidate	Votes	%	±%
Liberal Democrats	Anthony Rogers	510	48.1	
Labour	Kathryn Caulfield	403	38.0	
Liberal Democrats	Pamela Millward	402	37.9	
Labour	Paul Knaggs	305	28.8	
UKIP	Barry Thompson	176	16.6	
Conservative	Irene Wilkinson	79	7.5	
Majority		1	0.1	
Registered electors		3,233		
Turnout		1,063	32.9	
Rejected ballots		3	0.3	
Liberal Democrats gain from Labour				
Labour hold				

=== Old Whittington ===
Old Whittington
Party	Candidate	Votes	%	±%
Labour	Jean Innes	353	40.3	
Labour	Peter Innes	337	38.5	
Liberal Democrats	June Bingham	281	32.1	
Liberal Democrats	Andrew Jakins	216	24.7	
Chesterfield Independent	Paul Stone	204	23.3	
Chesterfield Independent	Philip Wood	131	15.0	
Conservative	Norman Andrews	110	12.6	
Majority		56	6.4	
Registered electors		3,071		
Turnout		891	29.0	
Rejected ballots		15	1.7	
Labour hold				
Labour hold				

=== Rother ===
Rother
Party	Candidate	Votes	%	±%
Labour	Jennifer Flood	651	62.2	
Labour	Lisa Blakemore	645	61.6	
Labour	Keith Miles	630	60.2	
Liberal Democrats	Dawn Nickson	270	25.8	
Liberal Democrats	Harry Atkins	209	20.0	
Liberal Democrats	Trevor Millward	209	20.0	
Conservative	Sara Scotting	176	16.8	
Majority		360	34.4	
Registered electors		4,584		
Turnout		1,062	23.2	
Rejected ballots		15	1.4	
Labour hold				
Labour hold				
Labour hold				

=== St. Helen's ===
St. Helen's
Party	Candidate	Votes	%	±%
Labour	Jill Mannion-Brunt	597	68.5	
Labour	Thomas Murphy	579	66.4	
Liberal Democrats	Oliver Fish	189	21.7	
Liberal Democrats	Yvette Marsden	169	19.4	
Conservative	Michael Sterland	95	10.9	
Majority		390	44.7	
Registered electors		3,526		
Turnout		905	25.7	
Rejected ballots		33	3.6	
Labour hold				
Labour hold				

=== St. Leonard's ===
St. Leonard's
Party	Candidate	Votes	%	±%
Labour	Sharon Blank	929	56.1	
Labour	Kathryn Sarvent	851	51.4	
Labour	Daniel Kelly	763	46.1	
Liberal Democrats	Adrian Mather	573	34.6	
Liberal Democrats	Margaret Cannon	560	33.8	
Liberal Democrats	Michael Harrison	399	24.1	
Conservative	Anne Sterland	327	19.8	
Majority		190	11.5	
Registered electors		5,960		
Turnout		1,699	28.5	
Rejected ballots		44	2.6	
Labour hold				
Labour hold				
Labour hold				

=== Walton ===
Walton
Party	Candidate	Votes	%	±%
Liberal Democrats	Margaret Kellman	1,131	60.4	
Liberal Democrats	Thomas Snowdon	1,015	54.2	
Liberal Democrats	Nicholas Redihough	984	52.6	
Labour	Rachel Rush	364	19.4	
Conservative	John Boult	341	18.2	
Conservative	Ian Jerram	319	17.0	
Labour	Graham Barnett	318	17.0	
Green	David Wadsworth	308	16.5	
Labour	Mark Stirland	298	15.9	
Conservative	John Scotting	282	15.1	
Majority		620	33.1	
Registered electors		4,514		
Turnout		1,896	42.0	
Rejected ballots		24	1.3	
Liberal Democrats hold				
Liberal Democrats hold				
Liberal Democrats hold				

=== West ===
West
Party	Candidate	Votes	%	±%
Liberal Democrats	Shirley Niblock	1,157	54.1	
Liberal Democrats	Howard Borrell	1,154	54.0	
Liberal Democrats	Paul Niblock	1,129	52.8	
Labour	Stephen Hibbert	512	23.9	
Labour	Stephen Marriott	497	23.2	
Conservative	James Dale	472	22.1	
Conservative	Marcus Linsey	459	21.5	
Conservative	Nigel Sterland	448	21.0	
Labour	Stephen Lismore	424	19.8	
Majority		617	28.9	
Registered electors		4,892		
Turnout		2,180	44.6	
Rejected ballots		42	1.9	
Liberal Democrats hold				
Liberal Democrats gain from Labour				
Liberal Democrats hold				

== Changes 2019–2023 ==
=== By-elections ===
==== Hollingwood & Inkersall ====
A by-election was held in Hollingwood and Inkersall ward on 7 July 2022 following the resignation of Independent councillor Mick Bagshaw.

Hollingwood & Inkersall: 7 July 2022
Party	Candidate	Votes	%	±%
Labour	Debbie Wheeldon	747	48.5	+15.2
Independent	Dean Rhodes	676	43.9	−9.1
Green	Louis Hollingworth	118	7.7	N/A
Majority		71	4.6	
Registered electors		5,771		
Turnout		1,549	26.8	
Rejected ballots		8	0.5	
Labour gain from Independent		Swing	▲12.2	
