= LDCF =

LDCF may refer to:

- In mathematics, the leading coefficient of a polynomial
- Least Developed Countries Fund of the United Nations
- Liberal Democrat Christian Forum, a British political organization
- Lymphocyte-derived chemotactic factor, a protein
- Lycée Dar Chaaben el Fehri, a school in Tunisia
