= Paul Holmes (Liberal Democrat politician) =

British Liberal Democrat politician

Councillor Paul Holmes
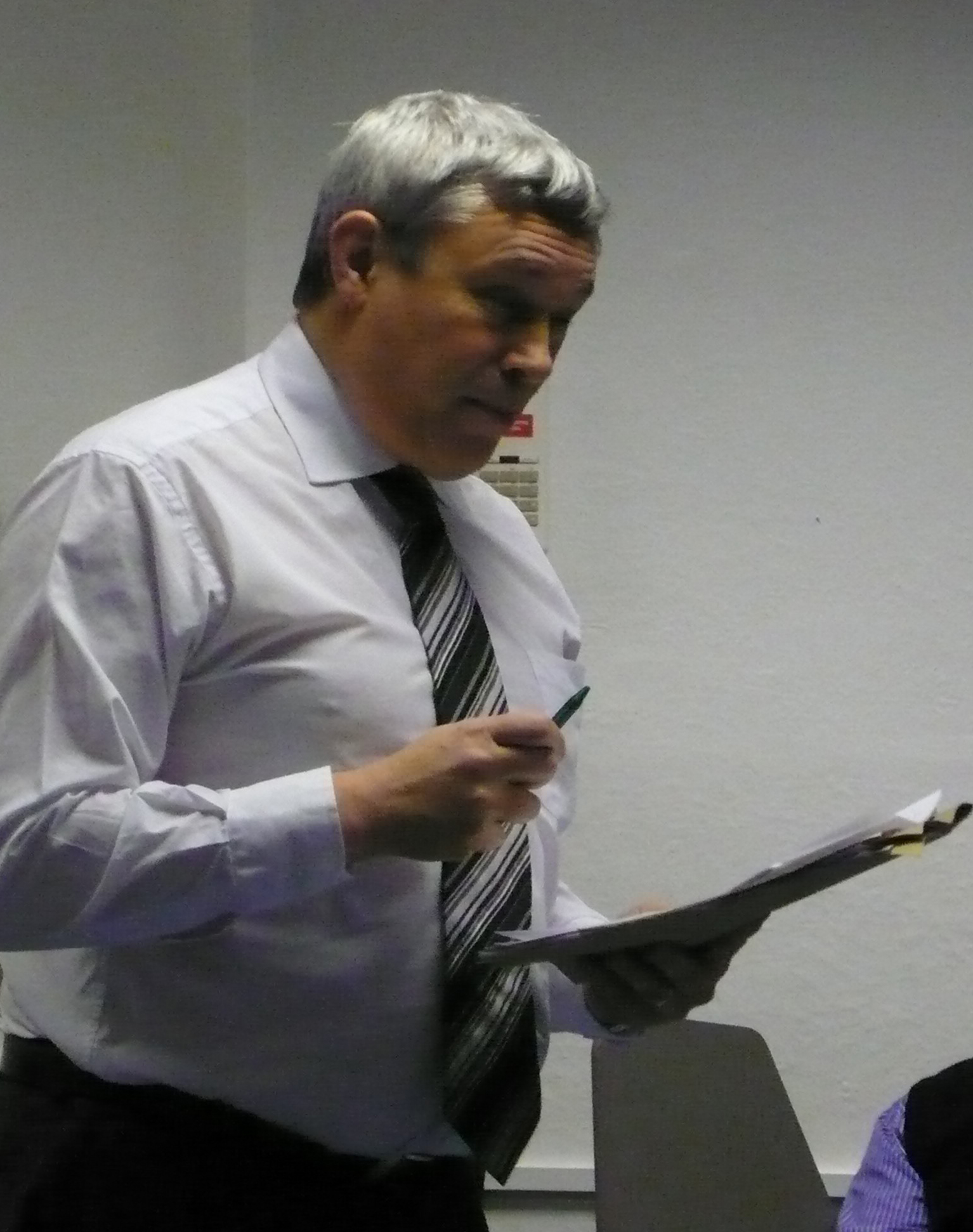

Chair of the Liberal Democrats Parliamentary Party
- In office 5 May 2005 – 25 October 2007
- Leader: Charles Kennedy; Menzies Campbell
- Preceded by: Matthew Taylor
- Succeeded by: Lorely Burt

Member of Parliament for Chesterfield
- In office 8 June 2001 – 12 April 2010
- Preceded by: Tony Benn
- Succeeded by: Toby Perkins

Personal details
- Born: 16 January 1957 (age 69) Sheffield, England
- Party: SDP (1983–1988); Liberal Democrats (1988–present)
- Spouse: Raelene Palmer (m. 1978)
- Children: 3
- Education: University of York; University of Sheffield

Paul Robert Holmes (born 16 January 1957) is a politician in the United Kingdom. He was the Liberal Democrat Member of Parliament for Chesterfield, succeeding the Labour Party's Tony Benn, from the 2001 general election until his defeat in 2010.

== Early life ==
Holmes grew up in Sheffield on a council estate. He went to Prince Edward Primary School, Manor Top, then Firth Park Secondary School (now Firth Park Community Arts College), which became a comprehensive in 1969.

== Career ==
Holmes graduated in History from the University of York in 1978 and before being elected an MP, was a history teacher for 22 years. He gained a PGCE from the University of Sheffield. He taught from 1979 to 1984 at Chesterfield School (now Brookfield Community School), then Buxton College from 1984–90, and from 1990–2001 he was Head of Sixth Form at Buxton Community School (the successor to Buxton College).

== Political career ==
Holmes joined the Social Democratic Party (SDP) in 1983. He was a councillor on Chesterfield Borough Council for Brimington South Ward from 1987 to 1995, firstly as a Social Democrat and then as a Liberal Democrat after the SDP merged with the Liberal Party to form the Liberal Democrats in 1988. He also served on the council from 1999 to 2003 for Walton ward. Holmes is currently the lead councillor for the opposition on Chesterfield Borough Council and is a councillor for Barrow Hill and New Whittington ward.

== Parliamentary career ==
Before becoming an MP, Holmes supported Simon Hughes in the leadership election following Paddy Ashdown's retirement in 1999. He was elected to the House of Commons at the 2001 general election, and in 2005 he was elected chairman of the Liberal Democrat Parliamentary party. This was seen as something of a surprise, since it came at the expense of incumbent chairman Matthew Taylor, who was a close friend of then-Liberal Democrat leader Charles Kennedy. Commentators attributed the result to dissatisfaction with some elements of Kennedy's leadership and a belief amongst MPs that the role of party chairman should be more that of a backbenchers' 'shop steward', more independent of the party leadership.

At the 2005 party conference, Holmes voted against plans by the leadership to support capping the European Union budget at 1% of GDP and to privatise the Royal Mail, and was on the winning side in both votes. However, he publicly declared himself to be in full support of Kennedy's leadership following rumours that Hughes was planning a leadership challenge. In the leadership election caused by the resignation of Charles Kennedy, Holmes was chair of Simon Hughes' leadership campaign, but it was Menzies Campbell who was elected party leader.

Holmes was a member of the House of Commons Education & Skills Select Committee from 2001 to 2007, but stood down from the Committee in July 2007 to concentrate on his appointment as Shadow Minister for Housing. Previously Holmes had been a Spokesman on Disability (2001–2005), Work and Pensions (2002–2005) and Arts and Heritage (2006–2007). In December 2007 he returned to the back benches, being one of only two MPs in the party to lose their shadow cabinet responsibilities in the reshuffle following Nick Clegg's election as Liberal Democrat leader.

Holmes hit the headlines in March 2008 when he was the only Liberal Democrat MP to sign an Early Day Motion praising Fidel Castro at the time of his resignation. He was quoted on the BBC as saying "It is true Cuba has political prisoners and no free elections, but it has very good dentistry."

Holmes was the Liberal Democrat Shadow Minister for Justice and sat on the Children, Families and Schools Select Committee.

Holmes is a founding member of the centre-left Beveridge Group within the Liberal Democrats. He is also an Honorary Associate of the National Secular Society and a Distinguished Supporter of Humanists UK, and was also a vice-chair of the All Party Parliamentary Humanist Group, before his defeat in the 2010 general election.

== Personal life ==
In 1978 he married Raelene Palmer. His children were born and brought up in Chesterfield.

== See also ==
- Liberal Democrat frontbench team

Parliament of the United Kingdom
Preceded by Tony Benn	Member of Parliament for Chesterfield; 2001–2010	Succeeded by Toby Perkins
Party political offices
Preceded by Matthew Taylor	Chair of the Liberal Democrats; 2005–2010	Succeeded by Vacant
