= Truro and St Austell =

UK Parliament constituency (1997–2010)

Coordinates: 50.316°N 4.915°W

- Former county constituency for the House of Commons
- Boundary of Truro and St Austell in Cornwall for the 2005 general election

- Location of Cornwall within England
- County: Cornwall
- Major settlements: Truro and St Austell

1997–2010
- Seats: One
- Created from: Truro
- Replaced by: Truro and Falmouth, St Austell and Newquay

Truro and St Austell was a county constituency in Cornwall represented in the House of Commons of the UK Parliament from its 1997 creation to its 2010 abolition by Matthew Taylor of the Liberal Democrats, who was appointed a life peer in the House of Lords following his service as a Member of Parliament (MP). The constituency elected one MP by the first past the post system of election.

== History ==
The constituency has existed in a number of different forms. The Truro constituency, up until 1885 elected two MPs; this was reduced to one. In 1918 the constituency was abolished but it was recreated again in 1950.

In 1997, in spite of the fact that no boundary changes were made to Truro on that occasion, the Boundary Commission nonetheless saw fit to change its name to Truro and St Austell, reflecting the fact that St Austell has a larger population than Truro. The Truro seat became a safe Liberal seat due to the popularity of its former MP, David Penhaligon, who died in a car crash in 1986, aged 42. He was succeeded in a by-election the following year by Matthew Taylor, who held the seat comfortably until his retirement, at the constituency's abolition, in 2010.

== Boundaries ==
The District of Carrick wards of Boscawen, Chacewater, Feock, Kea, Kenwyn, Moresk, Newlyn, Perranzabuloe, Probus, Roseland, St Agnes, St Clement, Tregolls, Trehaverne; and the Borough of Restormel wards of Crinnis, Mevagissey, Poltair, Rock, St Ewe, St Mewan, St Stephen-in-Brannel, Trevarna, Treverbyn.

The constituency was centred on the former district of Carrick (which contains the city of Truro) and the former borough of Restormel (which contains the town of St Austell).

=== Boundary review ===
Following a review of parliamentary representation in Cornwall, the Boundary Commission for England created an extra seat for the county which meant consequential changes for the existing seats. The constituency of Truro and St Austell, which was abolished, was partly succeeded by St Austell and Newquay.

The city of Truro forms part of the newly created Truro and Falmouth constituency.

== Members of Parliament ==
Election	Member	Party
1997	Matthew Taylor	Liberal Democrat
2010	Constituency abolished: see Truro and Falmouth and St Austell and Newquay	

== Elections ==
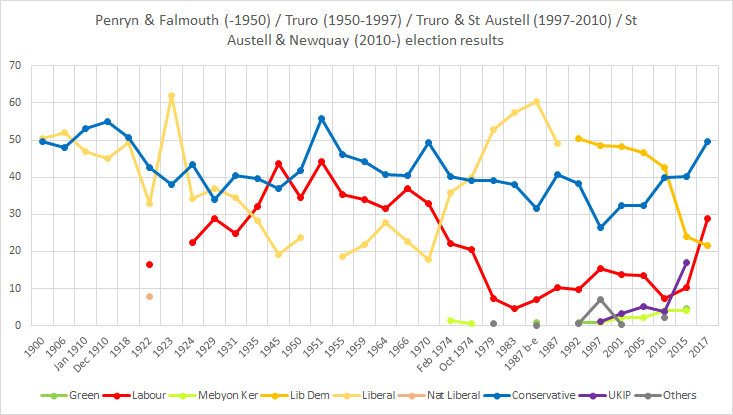
St Austell area election results

=== Elections in the 2000s ===
General election 2005: Truro and St Austell
Party	Candidate	Votes	%	±%
Liberal Democrats	Matthew Taylor	24,089	46.7	−1.6
Conservative	Fiona Kemp	16,686	32.4	+0.1
Labour	Charlotte Mackenzie	6,991	13.6	−0.1
UKIP	David Noakes	2,736	5.3	+2.0
Mebyon Kernow	Conan Jenkin	1,062	2.1	−0.2
Majority		7,403	14.3	−1.7
Turnout		51,564	64.2	+0.7
Liberal Democrats hold		Swing	-0.8	

General election 2001: Truro and St Austell
Party	Candidate	Votes	%	±%
Liberal Democrats	Matthew Taylor	24,296	48.3	−0.2
Conservative	Timothy Bonner	16,231	32.3	+5.9
Labour	David Phillips	6,889	13.7	−1.6
UKIP	James Wonnacott	1,664	3.3	+2.3
Mebyon Kernow	Conan Jenkin	1,137	2.3	+1.5
Independent	John Lee	78	0.2	New
Majority		8,065	16.0	−6.1
Turnout		50,295	63.5	−10.5
Liberal Democrats hold		Swing	-3.0	

=== Elections in the 1990s ===
General election 1997: Truro and St Austell
Party	Candidate	Votes	%	±%
Liberal Democrats	Matthew Taylor	27,502	48.5	−2.0
Conservative	Neil Badcock	15,001	26.4	−11.9
Labour	Michael Dooley	8,697	15.3	+5.5
Referendum	Carl Hearn	3,682	6.5	New
UKIP	Alan Haithwaite	576	1.0	New
Green	Dorienne Robinson	482	0.8	−0.1
Mebyon Kernow	Davyth Hicks	450	0.8	New
Independent	Lorna Yelland	240	0.4	New
Natural Law	Peter Bolland	117	0.2	0.0
Majority		12,501	22.1	+9.9
Turnout		56,747	74.0	−8.3
Liberal Democrats win (new seat)				

For elections before 1997, see Truro

== See also ==
- Parliamentary constituencies in Cornwall

== Sources ==
- Robert Beatson, A Chronological Register of Both Houses of Parliament (London: Longman, Hurst, Res & Orme, 1807)
