= David Howell, Baron Howell of Guildford =

British politician (born 1936)

The Right Honourable The Lord Howell of Guildford PC
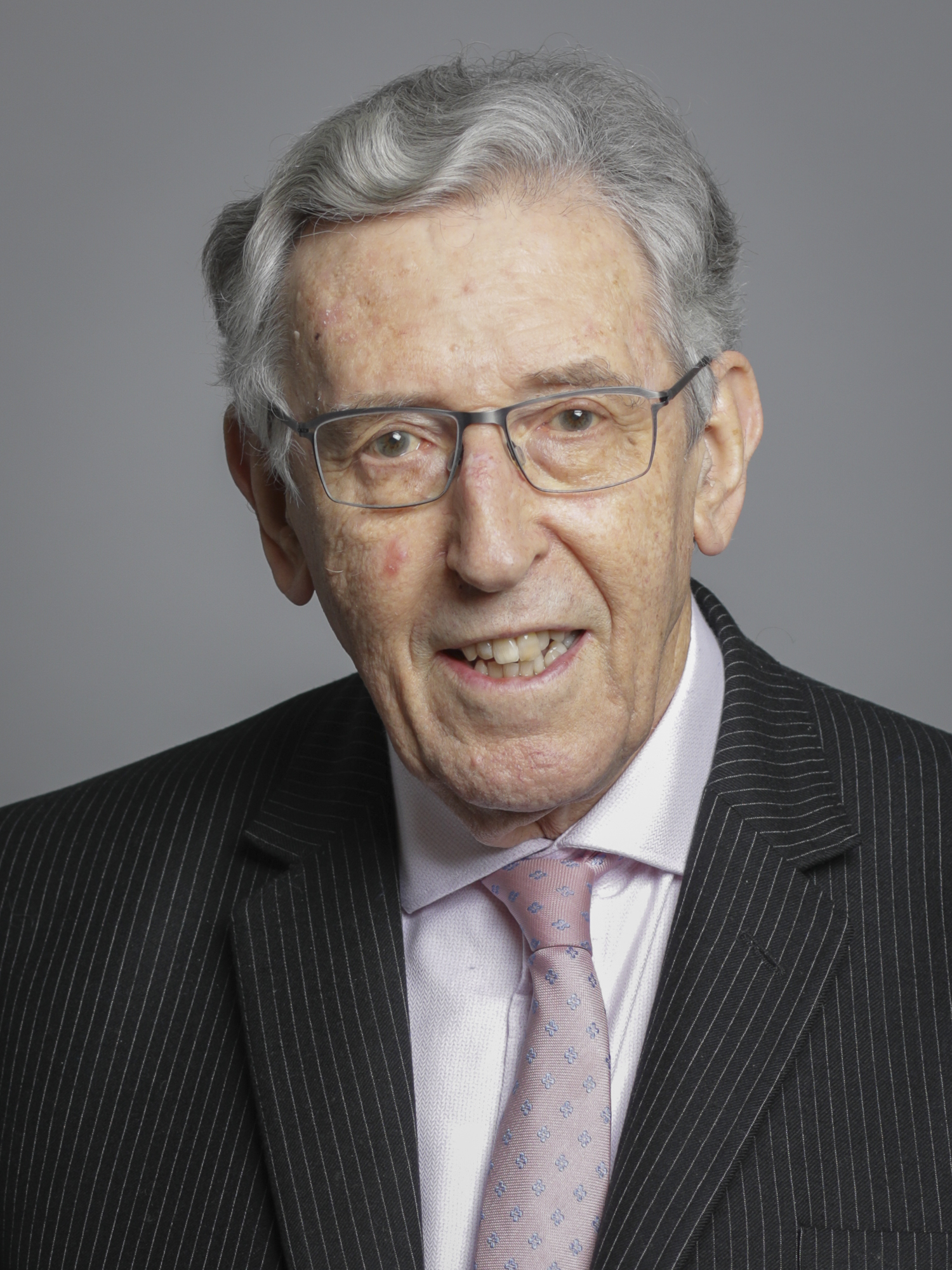
- Official portrait, 2020

Minister of State for International Energy Policy
- In office 14 May 2010 – 5 September 2012
- Prime Minister: David Cameron
- Preceded by: Office established
- Succeeded by: The Baroness Warsi

Secretary of State for Transport
- In office 14 September 1981 – 11 June 1983
- Prime Minister: Margaret Thatcher
- Preceded by: Norman Fowler
- Succeeded by: Tom King

Secretary of State for Energy
- In office 4 May 1979 – 14 September 1981
- Prime Minister: Margaret Thatcher
- Preceded by: Tony Benn
- Succeeded by: Nigel Lawson
Junior ministerial offices
Minister of State for Energy
In office 8 January 1974 – 4 March 1974
Prime Minister	Edward Heath
Sec. of State	The Lord Carrington
Preceded by	Position established
Succeeded by	Thomas Balogh
Minister of State for Northern Ireland
In office 5 November 1972 – 8 January 1974
Prime Minister	Edward Heath
Sec. of State	Francis Pym
Preceded by	William van Straubenzee
Succeeded by	Stan Orme
Parliamentary Under-Secretary of State for Northern Ireland
In office 26 March 1972 – 5 November 1972
Prime Minister	Edward Heath
Sec. of State	Willie Whitelaw
Preceded by	Position established
Succeeded by	Peter Mills
Parliamentary Under-Secretary of State for Employment
In office 5 January 1971 – 26 March 1972
Prime Minister	Edward Heath
Sec. of State	Robert Carr; Maurice Macmillan
Preceded by	Dudley Smith
Succeeded by	Nicholas Scott
Lord Commissioner of the Treasury
In office 24 June 1970 – 6 January 1971
Prime Minister	Edward Heath
Chancellor	Anthony Barber
Preceded by	Reginald Eyre
Succeeded by	Hector Monro
Parliamentary Secretary for the Civil Service Department
In office 23 June 1970 – 26 March 1972
Prime Minister	Edward Heath
Preceded by	Office established
Succeeded by	Kenneth Baker
Committee offices
Chair of the House of Lords International Relations Committee
In office 25 May 2016 – 1 July 2019
Preceded by	Committee established
Succeeded by	The Baroness Anelay of St Johns
Chair of the Foreign Affairs Select Committee
In office 1 January 1987 – 21 March 1997
Preceded by	Anthony Kershaw
Succeeded by	Donald Anderson
Further offices held
Shadow Deputy Leader of the House of Lords
In office 8 June 2005 – 6 May 2010
Leader	Michael Howard; David Cameron
Shad. Leader	The Lord Strathclyde
Preceded by	The Baroness Blatch
Succeeded by	The Lord Hunt of Kings Heath
Member of the House of Lords
Lord Temporal
Life peerage 6 June 1997
Member of Parliament for Guildford
In office 31 March 1966 – 8 April 1997
Preceded by	George Nugent
Succeeded by	Nick St Aubyn

Personal details
- Born: David Arthur Russell Howell; 18 January 1936 (age 90) London, England
- Party: Conservative
- Spouse: Cary Davina Wallace (m. 1967)
- Children: 3, including Frances
- Education: King's College, Cambridge

David Arthur Russell Howell, Baron Howell of Guildford, PC (born 18 January 1936) is a British Conservative Party politician, journalist, and economic consultant. Having been successively Secretary of State for Energy and then for Transport under Margaret Thatcher, Howell has more recently been a Minister of State in the Foreign Office from the election in 2010 until the reshuffle of 2012. He has served as Chair of the House of Lords International Relations Committee since May 2016. Along with William Hague, Sir George Young and Kenneth Clarke, he is one of the few Cabinet ministers from the 1979–97 governments who continued to hold high office in the party, being its deputy leader in the House of Lords until 2010. His daughter, Frances, was married to the former Chancellor of the Exchequer, George Osborne.

== Early life ==
Howell was educated at Eton College, before entering King's College, Cambridge, where he graduated Bachelor of Arts in 1959 with first-class honours in economics. He proceeded to the degree of Master of Arts in 1963. He went to work in HM Treasury joining the Treasury Economic Section from 1959 to 1960. In 1960 he wrote the book Principles to Practice, published jointly, and spent four years as a journalist, leader writer and special correspondent on The Daily Telegraph. He succeeded Geoffrey Howe as editor of Crossbow (the journal of the Bow Group) from 1962 to 1964 before he unsuccessfully contested the constituency of Dudley in the 1964 general election.

== Political career ==
Two years later, in 1966, Howell was elected MP for the safe seat of Guildford in Surrey, for the Conservative Party, a seat he held until retiring at the 1997 general election. On 6 June 1997 he was made a life peer as Baron Howell of Guildford, of Penton Mewsey, in the County of Hampshire.

When Margaret Thatcher was elected in 1979, she made Howell her first Secretary of State for Energy and then moved him to Transport in the reshuffle of September 1981 and until 1983. His time at the Ministry of Transport saw the commissioning and publication of the highly controversial Serpell Report into Britain's Railways. The report which emerged included proposals which would have greatly reduced the rail network in Britain and met with an extremely hostile reaction. Although these proposals were not pursued, the episode caused considerable political problems for the Government and contributed to Thatcher dropping Howell from the Cabinet.

Howell wrote the book Freedom and Capital, published 1981. He then wrote the book Blind Victory: a study in income, wealth and power, published 1986. In 1987 he became chairman of the Select committee on Foreign Affairs. He was president of the British Institute of Energy Economics from 2005 to 2014 and has been chairman of the Windsor Energy Group since 2003.

In the House of Lords, he was Deputy Leader of the Opposition from 2005 to 2010. On the election of the Coalition government he was quickly recommended to Foreign Secretary by the Prime Minister as an enthusiastic advocate of HS2, the only conservative in the government with the relevant ministerial experience. In the September 2012 reshuffle, having served two years as initially agreed, he was asked by the Prime Minister to stand down to provide a Foreign Office place for Baroness Warsi. Howell was Opposition Spokesperson for Foreign and Commonwealth Affairs from 2000 to 2010. He is now Chairman of the new House of Lords International relations Committee. Lord Howell is also Chairman of The Commonwealth Societies Association.

From the election of May 2010 until the reshuffle of 2012, Lord Howell served as Minister of State in the Foreign Office in David Cameron's government, under William Hague as Foreign Secretary. From September 2012 to April 2013, he was personal adviser to the Foreign Secretary on Energy and Resource Security.

In November 2012, Greenpeace released secret film of an interview with Lord Howell about the advantages of natural gas over wind power, in which he said that David Cameron "is not familiar with these issues, doesn't understand them", but that George Osborne, his son-in-law, "is of course getting this message and is putting pressure on".

In May 2013, he was appointed president of the Energy Industries Council. In July 2013, he said, in a Lords' discussion on fracking, "there are large, uninhabited and desolate areas, certainly in parts of the north-east, where there is plenty of room for fracking, well away from anybody's residence, and where it could be conducted without any threat to the rural environment". There was much adverse reaction.

== Ministerial career ==
Table to show Ministerial posts held
Post	Date
Minister of State (Foreign and Commonwealth Office) (International Energy Policy)	May 2010 – Sep 2012
Shadow Deputy Leader of the House of Lords	Jun 2005 – May 2010
Shadow Minister (Foreign and Commonwealth Affairs)	Jul 2000 – May 2010
Secretary of State for Transport	Sep 1981 – Jun 1983
Secretary of State for Energy	May 1979 – Sep 1981
Shadow Minister (Business, Innovation and Skills)	Jul 1977 – May 1979
Minister of State (Department of Energy)	Jan 1974 – Mar 1974
Parliamentary Under-Secretary (Northern Ireland Office)	Mar 1972 – Nov 1972
Parliamentary Under-Secretary (Department of Employment)	Jan 1971 – Mar 1972
Lord Commissioner (HM Treasury) (Whip)	Jun 1970 – Jan 1971
Parliamentary Secretary (Civil Service Department)	Jun 1970 – Mar 1972

== Arms ==
Coat of arms of David Howell, Baron Howell of Guildford
Crest A Japanese crane Proper beaked Or and grasping in the sinister foot a lily Argent slipped and leaved Or. Escutcheon Argent four rows palewise in fess composed of billets fesswise Gules each charged with a goutte Or on a fess Sable three towers Or each enfiling an ancient crown Gules. Supporters On either side a gryphon reguardant Argent beaked winged and grasping in the interior forefoot a fleur-de-lys Or. Motto Ideas Conquer All

== Bibliography ==
- Charles Mosley, editor, Burke's Peerage, Baronetage & Knightage, 107th edition, 3 volumes (Wilmington, Delaware, U.S.A.: Burke's Peerage (Genealogical Books) Ltd, 2003), volume 1, pages 51 and 456.
- Charles Mosley, Burke's Peerage and Baronetage, 107th edition, volume 2, page 1989.
- Harris OBE, Robin (2013). Not for Turning: Margaret Thatcher. London.
- Thatcher, Margaret. Path to Power. London.
- Thatcher, Margaret. Downing Street Years. London.
- Thatcher, Margaret (2014). The Iron Lady. London.

Parliament of the United Kingdom
Preceded by George Nugent	Member of Parliament for Guildford; 1966–1997	Succeeded by Nick St Aubyn
Political offices
Preceded by Tony Benn	Secretary of State for Energy; 1979–1981	Succeeded by Nigel Lawson
Preceded by Norman Fowler	Secretary of State for Transport; 1981–1983	Succeeded by Tom King
Orders of precedence in the United Kingdom
Preceded by The Lord Jopling	Gentlemen; Baron Howell of Guildford	Followed by The Lord Steel of Aikwood
