= Annette Penhaligon =

British politician

Dame Annette Penhaligon Egerton, DBE (née Lidgey; born 9 February 1946) is a British politician.

Annette Lidgey was born to Owen Bennett and Mabel (née Richards) Lidgey, and was educated at Truro High School for Girls in Truro. On 6 January 1968, she married the Liberal politician David Penhaligon. He had recently taken over his father's job as sub-postmaster at Chacewater, Cornwall, and after their marriage she took over that role until 1976.

When her husband was elected Member of Parliament for Truro in 1974, she became his secretary and remained as such until his death in a car accident in 1986. From 1987 to 1994 she was a member of Carrick District Council.

In 1993, she was appointed Dame Commander of the Order of the British Empire (DBE) for her public service and contributions to politics.

From 1992 to 2002 she was a non-executive director of Cornwall Independent Radio, becoming also a founding director of Pirate FM, and served as a member of Restormel Borough Council from 2003 until it was abolished in 2009. In the borough council's final year she was Leader of the Council, replacing Tim Jones. In 1994, she married Robert Egerton.

== Sources ==
- Peerage & Gentry
