= Hugh Hickling =

British lawyer, colonial civil servant, law academic and author

Reginald Hugh Hickling CMG, QC
- Born: Reginald Hugh Hickling; 2 August 1920; Derby, East Midlands, England, UK
- Died: 11 February 2007 (aged 86); Malvern, Worcestershire, England, UK
- Occupations: Lawyer, colonial civil servant, law academic and author
- Known for: Drafting the Malayan Internal Security Act (1960) which is still in force in Singapore, and was once in force in Malaysia until its repeal in 2012.
- Title: professor
- Spouse: Beryl (Bee) Dennett

Reginald Hugh Hickling, CMG, QC (2 August 1920 – 11 February 2007), known as Hugh Hickling, was a British lawyer, civil servant, law academic, and author, and author of the controversial Internal Security Act of colonial Malaysia.

Born in Derby, England, Hickling served from 1941 until 1946 in the British Royal Navy during World War II, and then joined the Colonial Legal Service. In 1955, Hickling was posted to Malaya (now Malaysia), where he gained prominence as a lawmaker. He drafted the Constitution of Malaysia, and as Commissioner of Law Revision wrote the Internal Security Act (ISA) of 1960, which provided for the detention of persons without trial. The ISA was later used to suppress political opponents or those dedicated to non-violent activities, which Hickling later said was not his intention.

In 1972, Hickling retired from the civil service, and subsequently lectured in law in Australia, Malaysia, Singapore, and the United Kingdom. Hickling later wrote many books and law journal articles, and also wrote novels and short stories throughout his career. Hickling died in 2007 in Malvern, Worcestershire.

== Early life 1920–1950 ==
Hickling was the son of Frederick Hickling, a police inspector, and his wife Elsie, of Malvern, Worcestershire. Hickling was born on 2 August 1920 in Derby, and educated at Buxton College. He applied to study at the University of Oxford, but was unsuccessful at his interview, because he shocked his examiner by rating the poetry of A. E. Housman over that of William Wordsworth. He studied instead at the University of Nottingham, where he became the youngest student to graduate with a Bachelor of Laws (LL.B.). After graduation, Hickling joined a law firm as an articled clerk, and then enrolled for one year of approved academic study at the East Midlands School of Law.

Between 1941 and 1946 Hickling served as an ordinary seaman in World War II with the Royal Naval Volunteer Reserve on board HMS La Malouine, a 29-metre French corvette taken over by the British. The ship was part of Convoy PQ 17, carrying matériel from Britain and the US to the USSR. PQ 17 sailed in June–July 1942 and suffered the heaviest losses of any Russia-bound convoy, with 25 vessels out of 36 lost to enemy action. On D-Day, he was a Sub-Lieutenant commanding an Mk IV Landing Craft Tank 1013 with LCT 1018 of the 43rd LCT flotilla, which carried several hundred tons of ammunition to Sword Beach, Normandy.

Hickling married Beryl (Bee) Dennett in 1945, and the following year he resumed his legal career as deputy solicitor with the Evening Standard in London. After the death of their firstborn son, they emigrated despite his wife's uncertainty about moving as far from England as possible.

== Crown colony 1950–1972 ==
Hickling joined the Colonial Legal Service, and in 1950 was posted to Sarawak, then a British colony, as assistant attorney general and, as he put it, "cheerfully assisted in the dissolution of Empire". In 1954, he spent two months in the sultanate of Brunei to research its constitutional status and to brief colonial officials on its history and traditions before the introduction of a written constitution, and submitted his memorandum on the matter in 1955.

Immediately thereafter, Hickling was transferred to Malaya as its first parliamentary draftsman, and in that capacity he helped to prepare the Malayan (now Malaysian) constitution for that country's independence from Britain in 1957. Subsequently, as Commissioner of Law Revision he drafted the Internal Security Act of 1960, based on the Emergency Ordinance 1948 which had been enacted to provide the British colonial authorities with powers to tackle a communist insurgency. For his contributions to Malaya, Hickling was made a Companion of the Order of the Defender of the Realm (known in Malay as the Johan Mangku Negara or JMN) by the Malayan head of state, the Yang di-Pertuan Agong, in 1961.

The Internal Security Act allows persons to be detained without trial for acting in any manner prejudicial to the security of Malaysia or to the maintenance of its essential services or economic life. It is authorised by Article 149 of the Malaysian Constitution, which stipulates that if an Act recites that action has been taken or threatened by any substantial body of persons, whether inside or outside the Federation in respect of certain situations – including organised violence against persons or property, the excitement of disaffection against the Yang di-Pertuan Agong or the government, or the promotion of feelings of ill-will and hostility between different races or classes of the population likely to cause violence – then any provision of that law designed to stop or prevent that action is valid notwithstanding that it is inconsistent with certain articles of the Constitution guaranteeing fundamental liberties. Upon Singapore's independence from Malaysia in 1965, the island republic retained both the Internal Security Act and Article 149 of the Constitution in its statute book. The Internal Security Act 1960 in Malaysia would remained in force for 52 years until its eventual repeal in 2012 and was replaced by SOSMA.

According to the New Straits Times, Hickling later wrote in 1989, "I could not imagine then that the time would come when the power of detention, carefully and deliberately interlocked with Article 149 of the Constitution, would be used against political opponents, welfare workers and others dedicated to nonviolent, peaceful activities." However, he commented that it was not for him to say if the Internal Security Act should be scrapped. "As a lawyer, I'm all for its review but on whether it should be scrapped, I don't know. You've got a multi-racial society [in Malaysia] in which emotions can run high very quickly." Interviewed on the Australian Broadcasting Corporation's radio programme PM in April 2001, Hickling agreed with the interviewer, Geoff Thompson, that he supported the law's continued existence and said he was "sorry to say that, in the light of my own experience, I'm inclined to think you couldn't really safely get rid of it at the moment". Worldwide terrorist attacks such as 9/11 confirmed his views on the matter.

Hickling later served with the Commonwealth Office in 1964, and as legal adviser to the High Commissioner in Aden and the Federation of South Arabia between 1964 and 1967. He was also Maritime Law Adviser in Thailand (1968–1969), Malaysia (1969), Sri Lanka (1970) and the Yemen Arab Republic (1984 and 1986). His last colonial post was that of Attorney General of Gibraltar between 1970 and 1972.

== Academia and later life 1972–2007 ==
After retiring from the civil service, Hickling became a law academic. He was a lecturer at the School of Oriental and African Studies in London (which awarded him a Doctor of Philosophy (PhD) in Law) from 1976 to 1978 and from 1981 to 1982 where he taught Southeast Asian law, and a visiting lecturer at the National University of Singapore Faculty of Law from 1974 to 1976 and again from 1978 to 1980. He was also adjunct Professor of Southeast Asian Law at the Universiti Kebangsaan Malaysia (National University of Malaysia) in Bangi, Selangor, for six years.

He authored books and law journal articles, particularly about public law in Malaysia and Singapore; some of the latter were collected into two works, Essays in Malaysian Law (1991) and Essays in Singapore Law (1992). In 1995, in recognition of his reputation and standing in the legal profession, he was appointed adjunct professor of law at the Centre of South East Asian Law at Charles Darwin University in Darwin in the Northern Territory, Australia. Until 2006, Hickling continued travelling to the Far East and Australia, delivering lectures, reviewing examination papers and visiting friends, colleagues and students. Despite his many accolades, he lived simply and impressed staff and students with his disarming humility. In addition to his legal writings, Hickling wrote novels and short stories, mostly drawing on his experiences of life in different British colonies. Hickling was appointed a Companion of the Order of St. Michael and St. George (CMG) in 1968 and a Queen's Counsel (Gibraltar) in 1970.

Upon his retirement, Hickling chose to settle in Malvern, Worcestershire, because of family connections to the town, and indulged his lifelong passion for the music of Mozart. He died after a short illness on 11 February 2007 in St. Richard's Hospice, Malvern, survived by his wife, two sons and a daughter, and 12 grandchildren.

== Works ==
=== Autobiographies ===
- In 1973–1974, while waiting for a Foreign Office posting, Hickling wrote an unpublished personal memoir recalling his time as legal adviser to the High Commissioner in Aden and the Federation of South Arabia between 1964 and 1967. Hickling deposited documents relating to this memoir at the Churchill Archives Centre of Churchill College, Cambridge, in 1996, where they may be accessed under the title "The Papers of (Reginald) Hugh Hickling" (reference GBR/0014/HICK).
- Hickling, R.H. (2000). Memoir of a Wayward Lawyer. Bangi, Selangor Darul Ehsan, Malaysia: Penerbit Universiti Kebangsaan Malaysia. ISBN 967-942-468-5.

=== Non-fiction ===
- Hickling, R.H. (1954). Sarawak and its Government: A First Book in Civics. [Sarawak, Malaysia?]: Government Printing Office. (2nd. rev. ed., 1959.)
- Hickling, R.H. (1960). Federation of Malaya: An Introduction to the Federal Constitution. Kuala Lumpur, Malaysia: Federation of Malaya Information Services. New edition:
- Hickling, R.H. (1984). The Reception of English Divorce Law in Malaysia or the Misadventures of What Is Now Section 47 of Act 164. Kuala Lumpur, Malaysia: Journal of Malaysian and Comparative Law 10 (1983): 189–200.
- Hickling, R.H. (1985). Introduction to the Federal Constitution. Kuala Lumpur, Malaysia: Malaysian Law Publishers.
- Hickling, R.H. (1979). Liberty and Law in Singapore. Singapore: Malaya Law Review, Faculty of Law, University of Singapore.
- Hickling, R.H. (1987). Malaysian Law: An Introduction to the Concept of Law in Malaysia. Kuala Lumpur, Malaysia: Professional (Law) Books Publishers. ISBN 967-9958-01-9.
- Hickling, R.H. (1991). Essays in Malaysian Law. Petaling Jaya, Selangor Darul Ehsan, Malaysia: Pelanduk Publications. ISBN 967-978-385-5.
- Hickling, R.H. (1992). Essays in Singapore Law. Petaling Jaya, Selangor Darul Ehsan, Malaysia: Pelanduk Publications. ISBN 967-978-421-5.
- Hickling, R.H.; Wu Min Aun (1995). Conflict of Laws in Malaysia. Malaysia; Singapore: Butterworths Asia. ISBN 0-409-99769-2.
- Hickling, R.H. (1997). Malaysian Public Law. Petaling Jaya, Selangor Darul Ehsan, Malaysia: Pelanduk Publications. ISBN 967-978-597-1. New edition:
  - Wu, Min Aun; R.H. Hickling (2003). Hickling's Malaysia Public Law. Petaling Jaya, Selangor Darul Ehsan, Malaysia: Pearson Malaysia. ISBN 983-74-2518-0.
- Hickling, R.H. (October 2001). "The Papers of (Reginald) Hugh Hickling". Janus, University of Cambridge.

=== Fiction ===
- Hickling, R.H. (1950). The Furious Evangelist: Being the Memoirs of Richard Civet during a Time of Moral Breakdown. London: Alvin Redman.
- Hickling, R.H. (1954). The English Flotilla: A War Novel. London: Macdonald. Published in the US as Hickling, R.H. (1956). Falconer's Voyage. Boston, Mass.: Houghton Mifflin.
- Hickling, R.H. (1957). Festival of Hungry Ghosts. London: Macdonald. Reprinted as Hickling, Hugh (1997). Festival of Hungry Ghosts: A Novel. Petaling Jaya, Selangor Darul Ehsan, Malaysia: Pelanduk Publications. ISBN 967-978-554-8.
- Hickling, R.H. (1968). Lieutenant Okino. London: Hutchinson of London. ISBN 0-09-088890-1. Reprinted as Hickling, Hugh (1997). Crimson Sun Over Borneo: A Novel. Petaling Jaya, Selangor Darul Ehsan, Malaysia: Pelanduk Publications. ISBN 967-978-555-6.
- Hickling, R.H. (1985). The Ghost of Orchard Road and Other Stories. Singapore: Times Books International. ISBN 9971-65-209-9.
- Hickling, R.H. (1985). A Prince of Borneo. Singapore: Graham Brash. ISBN 9971-947-74-9.
- Hickling, Hugh (1992). So Lucky! and Other Stories. Singapore: Graham Brash. ISBN 9971-4-9274-1.
- Hickling, Hugh (1994). The Dog Satyricon. Petaling Jaya, Selangor Darul Ehsan, Malaysia: Pelanduk Publications. ISBN 967-978-491-6.
- Hickling, R.H. (1994). Finding Hobbes. Bangi, Selangor Darul Ehsan, Malaysia: Penerbit Universiti Kebangsaan Malaysia. ISBN 9679422828. (hbk.), (pbk.).
- Hickling, R.H. The Lotus-Eaters. [S.l.]: [s.n.]
- Hickling, R.H. (2003). Waltzing Mice. Singapore: Times Books International. ISBN 981-232-520-4.
