= Angela Richardson =

British politician

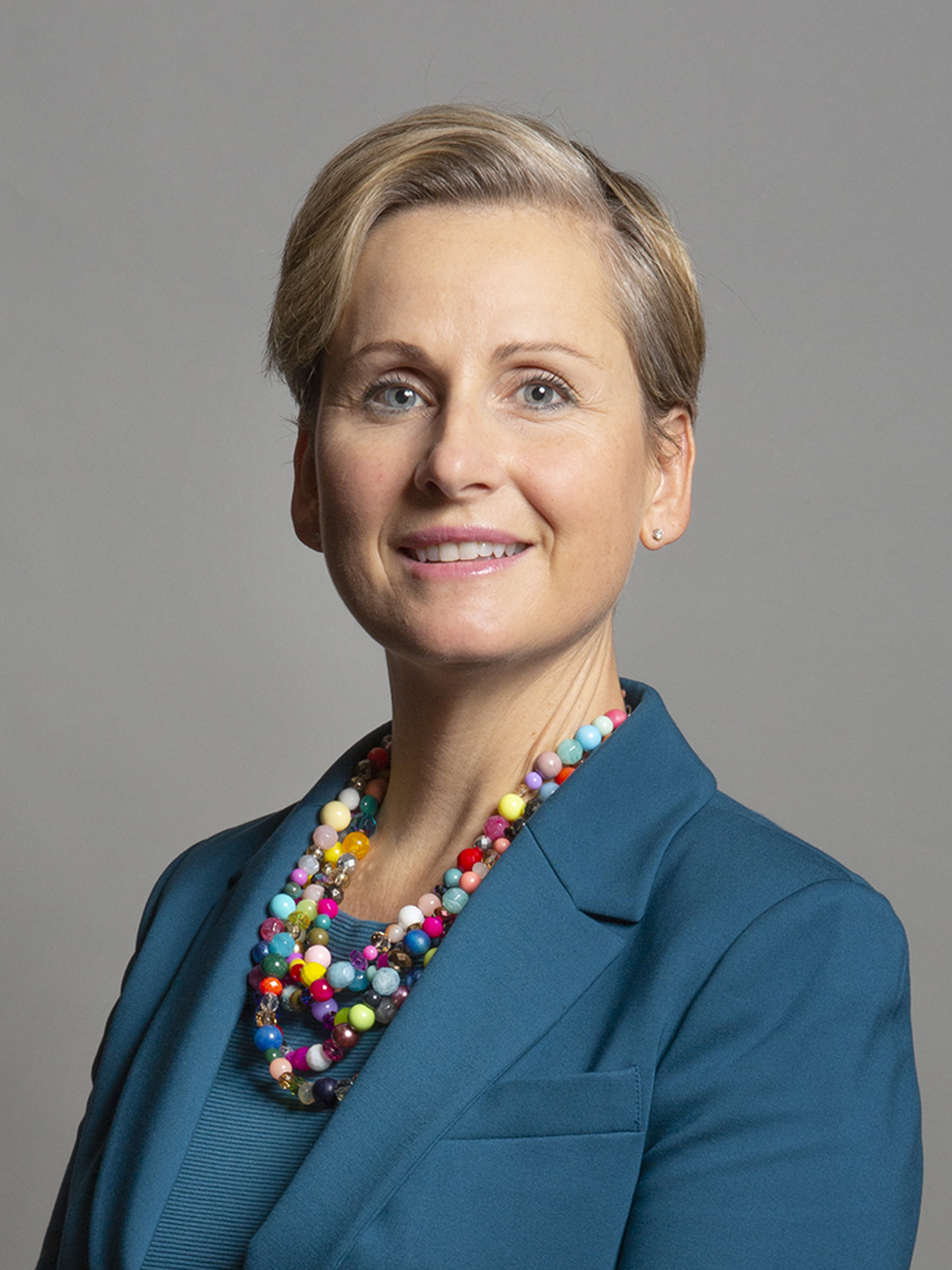
- Official portrait, 2019

Deputy Chairwoman of the Conservative Party
- In office 26 March 2024 – 5 July 2024
- Leader: Rishi Sunak

Member of Parliament for Guildford
- In office 12 December 2019 – 30 May 2024
- Preceded by: Anne Milton
- Succeeded by: Zöe Franklin

Personal details
- Born: Angela Joy Richardson; 21 October 1974 (age 51) Auckland, New Zealand
- Party: Conservative
- Spouse: Jeremy Bruce Richardson
- Children: 3
- Profession: Investment banking operations
- Website: angelarichardson.uk

Angela Joy Richardson (born 21 October 1974) is a British Conservative Party politician who was the Member of Parliament (MP) for Guildford from 2019 until 2024. She served as a Deputy Chairwoman of the Conservative Party until she lost her seat in the 2024 general election.

== Political career ==
In May 2019, Richardson stood for election to Waverley Borough Council in the ward of Cranleigh East, but failed to win a seat after she was pushed into fifth place by three Liberal Democrats and a Conservative candidate. She was elected to Cranleigh Parish Council later the same month.

At the 2019 general election, Richardson was elected to Parliament as MP for Guildford with 44.9% of the vote and a majority of 3,337. She was sworn into the House of Commons on 18 December 2019.

Upon her election to Parliament, she was also elected as a vice-chair of the APPG for Australia and New Zealand.

Richardson served as a Parliamentary private secretary (PPS) to the ministerial team at the Department for Education, and following this, to Levelling Up Secretary Michael Gove. On 3 November 2021, she was fired from her PPS role after abstaining on a government-backed amendment to overhaul the Commons' disciplinary process in response to the proposed suspension of Owen Paterson. She was reinstated to her PPS role the following day. She ultimately resigned as PPS in January 2022, with her resignation made public following the publication on 31 January of Sue Gray's report on breaches of lockdown restrictions in Downing Street.

In February 2024, Richardson was reselected as the Conservative candidate for Guildford at the 2024 general election.

On 26 March 2024, she was appointed as a Deputy Chairwoman of the Conservative Party, to replace Luke Hall who had been appointed Minister of State for Skills, Apprenticeships and Higher Education.

On 4 July 2024 she was defeated in the general election by the Liberal Democrat candidate, Zöe Franklin, who won with 22,937 votes (47.5%) against 14,508.

== Personal life ==
Angela Richardson was born on 21 October 1974 in West Auckland, New Zealand. She previously worked in the City of London in investment banking operations.

She is married to Jeremy Richardson, and has three children. Richardson lives in Guildford

Parliament of the United Kingdom
| Preceded by Anne Milton | Member of Parliament for Guildford; 2019–2024 | Succeeded by Zöe Franklin |
