= Buxton Community School =

Location
- Temple Road; Buxton, Derbyshire; England; 53.2508°N 1.9217°W

Information
- Type: Academy
- Established: 19 October 1993
- Local authority: Derbyshire County Council
- Trust: Embark Federation
- Department for Education URN: 149645 Tables
- Ofsted: Reports
- Headteacher: Sam Jones
- Gender: Coeducational
- Age: 11 to 18
- Enrolment: 1,038 as of May 2023
- Website: www.buxton.derbyshire.sch.uk

Buxton Community School is a coeducational secondary school and sixth form located in Buxton, Derbyshire, England. The school was officially opened on 19 October 1993 achieving the consolidation of four former Buxton schools on the site of the previous Buxton College. The school is a specialist sports college. The headteacher is Sam Jones.

In 2010 an Engineering Centre was added to the site and was officially opened by The Duke of Devonshire on the 13th October.

A 3G artificial all-weather grass pitch was a further addition in 2012 and this opened by Howard Webb MBE.

Previously a voluntary controlled school administered by Derbyshire County Council, in June 2023 Buxton Community School converted to academy status. The school is now sponsored by the Embark Federation. Academies have more autonomy with the National Curriculum and receive direct funding from the UK Government.
