= John Kendall-Carpenter =

England international rugby union player

John Kendall-Carpenter CBE
- Born: John MacGregor Kendall Kendall-Carpenter; 25 September 1925
- Died: 24 May 1990 (aged 64)
- School: Truro School
- University: Oxford University

Rugby union career
- Position: Back row forward
Senior career
Years	Team	Apps	(Points)
- Penzance-Newlyn
1947–55	Cornwall	28	
1948–50	Oxford University		
1948–49	Barbarians		
–	Bath		
International career
Years	Team	Apps	(Points)
1949–54	England	23	

John MacGregor Kendall Kendall-Carpenter CBE (25 September 1925 – 24 May 1990) was an English rugby union international who won 23 caps as a back row forward between 1949 and 1954. He subsequently served as President of the Rugby Football Union (1980–1981), the England Schools Rugby Football Union (1985–90) and Cornwall RFU (1984–87). He was also Chairman of the committee that organised the first Rugby World Cup in 1987.

He was one of only five Cornishmen to captain the England Rugby team – the others being E K Scott, Vic Roberts, Richard Sharp and Phil Vickery.

== Career ==
Kendall-Carpenter was educated at Truro School and Oxford University where he won his Blue playing in The Varsity Match at Twickenham for three successive years from 1948 to 1950. David Frost, the former Guardian rugby correspondent, recalled a famous tackle in the 1949 Varsity match when John Kendall-Carpenter preserved Oxford's 3–0 winning lead by thwarting J. V. Smith, the Cambridge centre, in the dying moments of the game:

Smith slipped his man, side-stepped two coverers and seemed certain to cross at the corner and bring at least an equalising try (three points in those days), reported the Guardian. Cambridge hats were already in the air and Oxford's supporters were dumb with horror but then at the last possible moment Kendall-Carpenter dived and took man and ball into touch a yard from the line.

He appeared as a club player for Penzance & Newlyn, forerunners of the Cornish Pirates, before moving on to Bath, where he was dubbed "Prince of Cornerflaggers", while he taught rugby and history at Clifton College, Bristol. Subsequently, he became the headmaster of Cranbrook School in Kent until 1970; of Eastbourne College, 1970–1973; and of Wellington School, Somerset, 1973–1990.

He was Chairman of the committee that organised the first Rugby World Cup in 1987. Kendall-Carpenter was appointed Commander of the Order of the British Empire (CBE) in the 1989 New Year Honours for services to rugby union.

On 24 October 2011, at the IRB Awards ceremony in Auckland, Kendall-Carpenter was posthumously recognised for his role in the creation of the Rugby World Cup with induction into the IRB Hall of Fame.

== Death and legacy ==
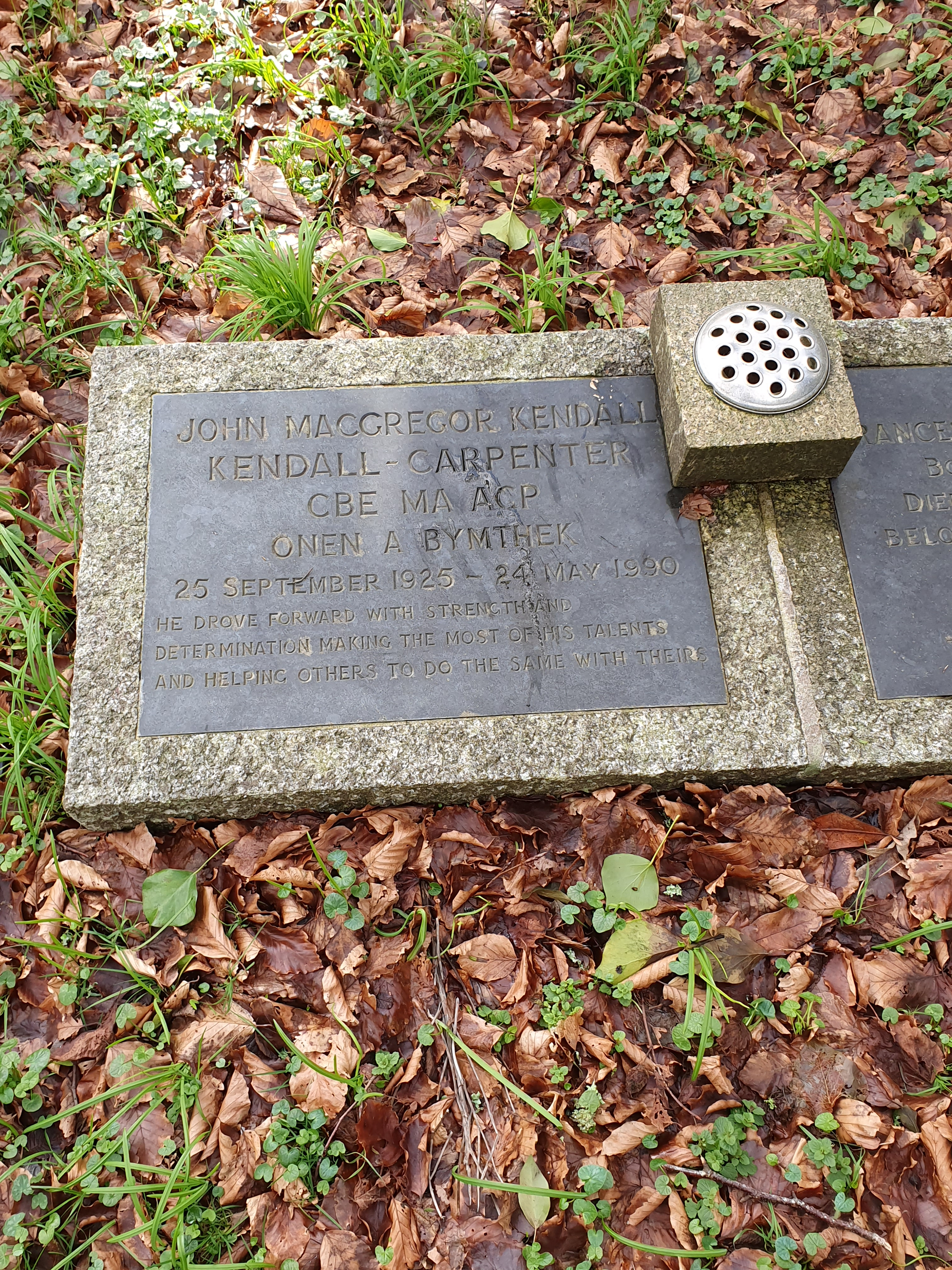
Kendall-Carpenter's grave in Gulval churchyard

Kendall-Carpenter died on 24 May 1990, and was buried in the churchyard of Gulval, Cornwall.

Following his death, a John Kendall-Carpenter Trust Fund was established. Linked to the Cornwall Rugby Football Union, the fund exists to help young people up to the age of 21 in sport both in Cornwall and elsewhere in the world. He was also honoured by his fellow Cornishmen by being appointed a Bard of Gorseth Kernow at Illogan in 1981:– Kendall-Carpenter, John Macgregor (D) (Onen A Bymthek)
