= Sue Doughty =

British politician

Member of Parliament for Guildford
- In office 7 June 2001 – 11 April 2005
- Preceded by: Nick St Aubyn
- Succeeded by: Anne Milton

Personal details
- Born: 13 April 1948 (age 77) York
- Party: Liberal Democrat
- Spouse: David Orchard
- Education: Mill Mount County Grammar School for Girls
- Alma mater: Northumberland College

Susan Kathleen Doughty (née Powell; born 13 April 1948) is a politician in the United Kingdom. She was the Liberal Democrat Member of Parliament for Guildford from 2001 to 2005.

== Early life ==
Doughty was born on 13 April 1948. She was brought up in York where she went to Mill Mount Grammar School for Girls on Mill Mount, whose site became All Saints' RC School after the abolition of the Grammar School scheme in 1985.

She gained a CertED at Northumberland College and worked as a primary school teacher for one year. Doughty subsequently entered the field of management services and worked in a variety of organisations spanning sectors such as utilities, the 'Big 4', law practices and financial services providers.

From 1982 to 1989, she worked as a freelance IT consultant. From 1989 to 1998, she was a Project Manager at Thames Water.

== Parliamentary career ==
Doughty entered Parliament in the 2001 election, becoming the first non-Conservative MP returned for Guildford since 1906 and the constituency's first ever female MP. In Parliament, she served as the Liberal Democrat Environment Spokesperson from 2001 to 2003, following on from her successful campaign opposing the construction of a large incinerator in Guildford. She was part of the front bench team from 2003 to 2005 and served on the Environmental Audit Select Committee throughout her time in Parliament. She was co-Chair of the All Party Parliamentary Waste Group (now the All Party Parliamentary Resource Group) and Secretary of the APPG for Renewable Energy.

She left in the 2005 general election, when she lost narrowly to the Conservative candidate Anne Milton. Doughty is a Quaker and upon her departure in 2005, left Parliament without any Quaker MPs for the first time in 150 years.

Doughty was re-selected as prospective parliamentary candidate for Guildford for the 2010 election, however she was again defeated by Milton. Between 2010 and 2016, she was a member of the Federal Executive Committee of the Liberal Democrats.

== Miscellaneous ==
- Doughty joined the Liberal Party, the predecessors to the Liberal Democrats, in 1979 while living near Newbury.
- Membership of the Environmental Audit Select committee (2001–2005)
- Selected as PPC to fight the Guildford Constituency (1998)
- Hansard lists the alternative names: Sue Powell (1948–2005) Sue Orchard-Doughty (1948–2005).

== Personal life ==
Doughty currently lives in Shalford, a suburb of Guildford. She was married to David Orchard (d. 2015) and she has two sons.

Parliament of the United Kingdom
Preceded by Nick St Aubyn	Member of Parliament for Guildford; 2001–2005	Succeeded by Anne Milton
