= Geoffrey Healey =

British automobile designer

Geoffrey Carroll Healey (14 December 1922 – 29 April 1994) was a British automotive engineer.

== Early life ==
Initially a pupil at Truro School, he transferred to Emscote Lawn School, Warwick in 1934, when his father joined the Triumph Motor Company in Coventry as their Experimental Manager. Geoffrey moved to Warwick School in April 1937 and took his School Certificate there in 1939.

At the start of the Second World War, Geoffrey, his mother and his brothers moved back to Cornwall, whereupon Geoffrey studied metallurgy at the Camborne School of Mines. Soon afterwards he became an apprentice at Cornercroft in Coventry and studied engineering at Coventry Technical College. He joined the new REME corps of the Army in late 1943, serving in Syria, the Lebanon and Egypt, reaching the rank of Captain.

== The Donald Healey Motor Company Ltd ==
Demobilised in 1947, he joined Armstrong Siddeley Motors as a development engineer. He stayed there for two years, before joining his father Donald in Warwick, also as Development Engineer. In 1949 the most sporting of all the Healeys, the Silverstone, was announced. It had a shorter chassis and stiffer springing and was capable of 107 mph. The cars had numerous competition successes including class wins in the 1947 and 1948 Alpine rallies and the 1949 Mille Miglia. It remains a highly sought-after car to this day and many of the other Healeys have been converted into Silverstone replicas.

In 1952, a joint venture with the British Motor Corporation created the Austin-Healey marque and later on the Austin-Healey Sprite. When BMC was restructured as British Leyland in 1968, Donald Healey left to become a director of Jensen Motors and a result of this was the Lotus engined Jensen-Healey, which appeared in 1972 when the original 20-year agreement between Healey and Austin came to an end . The Donald Healey Motor Company was finally sold to the Hamblin Group, although Healey Automobile Consultants and the engineering parts of the company remained in the hands of Geoffrey and Donald Healey. Geoffrey later returned to the Rover Group and until his retirement worked as a vehicle test engineer running test programmes in UK and overseas. The Healey Frogeye was the last car to bear the Healey name. It was conceived by Keith Brading of the Frogeye Car Company and approved by Donald, who enthused about the new Frogeye concept and insisted that Healey Automobile Consultants should be involved with the project. Geoffrey assessed the car as "brilliant" and took every opportunity to work with Keith, though commitment to Rover precluded any formal collaboration. However, thirteen months to the day after DMH's demise, a consultancy agreement was signed between Frogeye and Healey Automobile Consultants and the Healey Frogeye was manufactured under Geoffrey's guidance until after his death in 1994.

== Postscript ==
Two years after his death on 29 April 1994, his life story was published as "The Healey Story". This has been reviewed as "a Cornish father and son partnership and their 30-year involvement in the motor industry. The cars they made are still highly sought-after in Europe, the US and Australia, where many of the specials Geoffrey Healey prepared can now be found."

Geoffrey's widow, Margot A-M Healey (née Murcell), died on 30 November 2015, aged 88, after being diagnosed with Motor Neurone Disease.
