= Buxton College =

Coordinates: 53.2508°N 1.9202°W

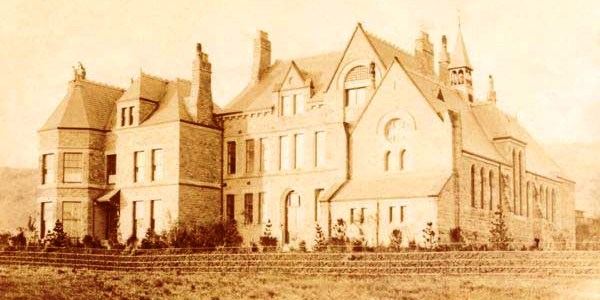
- The college's new building c.1890

Information
- Motto: Sic Luceat Lux Vestra (Let your light shine forth)
- Established: 1675
- Closed: 1993 (replaced by Buxton Community School)
- Gender: Boys (1675-1990); Mixed (1990-1993)

Founded in 1675, Buxton College was a boys' public school and, from 1923, a grammar school in Buxton, Derbyshire whose site has been expanded since 1990 to be used as the fully co-educational comprehensive Buxton Community School.

== History ==
The school was founded in 1675 by an amalgamation of various legacies of an earlier date together with subscriptions taken then.

Its motto was Sic Luceat Lux Vestra – "Let your light shine forth". The original school building was probably in Buxton next to the parish church of St Anne's on Bath Road.

The school was placed in Chancery between 1791 and 1816 and reopened in the now disused St Anne's Church. In 1840 it was moved to premises in the Market Place, and in 1867 a School House was built at the corner of Market Street and South Street, either in place of or in addition to, the Market Place building. In 1873 it was determined by the charity Commissioners that the school should be classified as a grammar school. After its foundation, the school appears to have been under the control of a number of different trusts, the latest one known was a scheme approved by the Queen in Council at Balmoral on 23 October 1876, giving the trustees authority to acquire land for new school buildings "for not less than 80 scholars". After a re-organisation, it then moved as the Buxton Endowed School to new purpose-built premises on land off Green Lane, re-opening there on 27 September 1881. (near the entrance to Poole's Cavern).

The new building of 1880–81 was designed by William Pollard of Manchester in the Gothic style. There was a small boarding house. By 1890, under a new headmaster, Dr R. Archibald Little (1888–1910), the number of boarders had increased to 33. Many alterations and additions were made to the buildings during 1891–92. Additions included a chemistry laboratory, which remained in use through to the 1970s, a workshop, and a gymnasium. The original laundry was converted into a dining room and both it and the dormitories on the two floors above it were extended to double their length. In 1898, the school added a sanatorium at the rear of the headmaster's house. An Assembly Hall was built during 1899–1900, and at the same time the old Schoolroom was divided into three much-needed classrooms and a corridor giving access to them and the hall was constructed. By 1900, there were nearly one hundred boys in the school, of whom sixty were boarders. By 1910, there were still over seventy boys, but the number of boarders had fallen to 26, and the position of the school was precarious.

At the end of the Summer Term of 1923, after two and a half centuries as a fully independent school, the college became a maintained grammar school. As a County Grammar school, alterations and improvements to the buildings were carried out throughout the year, under the direction of the Derbyshire County Council Architect's department, including a new heating system for the main building, improved windows for the classrooms, and renovation of the top dormitory baths and washbowls. Additional laboratory equipment was acquired for Physics and the laundry was equipped as a handicraft room – later to become the boarders' locker and changing room.

In September 1927 the school launched a new sixth form, with only two boys in it, and in the summer of 1928 building work began on three sides of a new quadrangle designed by Derbyshire County Council's Architect George H. Widdows, to enable some of the expansion requested by the Headmaster, A. D. C. Mason (1923–1944). The fourth side was never completed as designed, although thirty years later a new physics laboratory was built at one end of it. During the 1930s, "Mr Mason accepted about 30 ... refugee German boys of Jewish extraction ... as boarders. Many of the German boys had high ability ... including Heinz Thannhauser undoubtedly one of the most brilliant boys ever to attend the School. For this act of humanity and generosity (in some cases he [Mason] charged no fees and bore the whole cost himself) he met with a fair amount of local criticism."

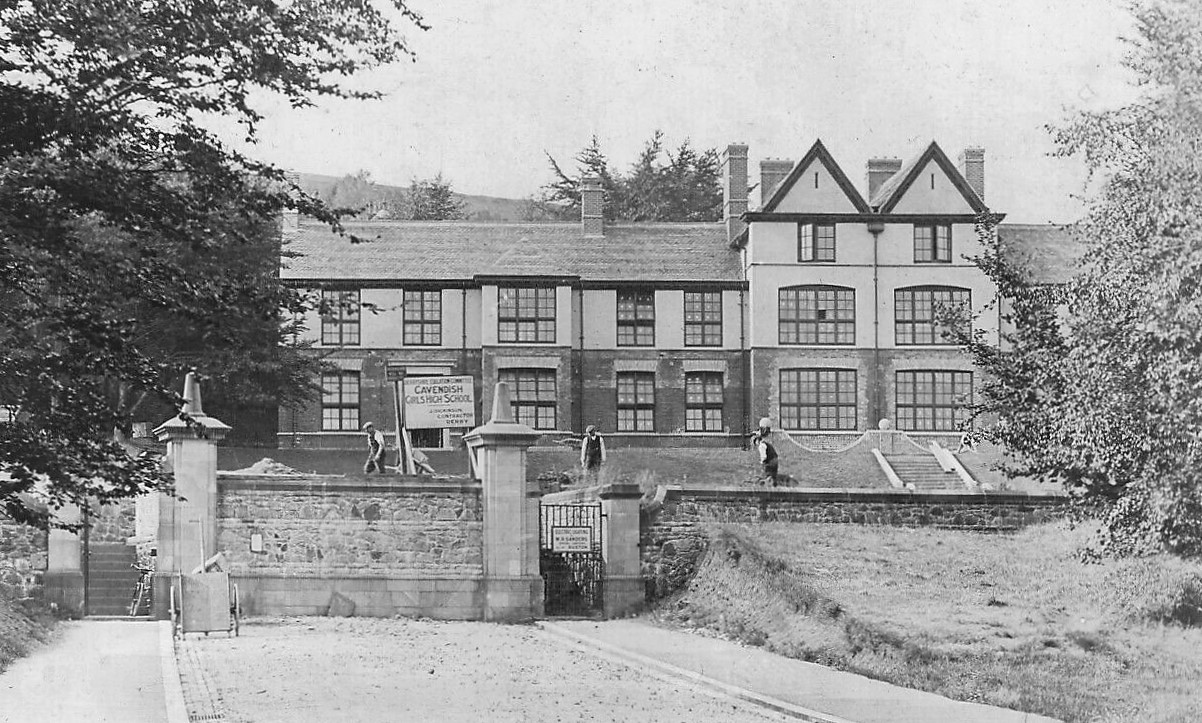
The Cavendish School for Girls on Corbar Road, Buxton

After the Second World War, the Dramatic Societies of the College and the nearby Cavendish Grammar School for Girls staged annual performances of plays at the Buxton Playhouse, either modern works, such as Bertold Brecht's Life of Galileo (1967) and Dylan Thomas's The Doctor and the Devils (1969), or Shakespeare plays, such as Hamlet (1966), Coriolanus (1968) and Macbeth (1970).

In May 1953 the Local Education Authority purchased the nearby Arts & Crafts inspired house, formerly known as 'Heatherton' designed by W. R. Bryden and built in 1910 on the opposite side of Temple Road for the stockbroker Henry Lancashire. The house, renamed as Hartington, was used by the school from September 1953, and the increased capacity enabled all classes at last to have their own base classrooms. An enlarged school library was also provided.

The boarding house remained full until the late 1960s, when de-colonisation and the contraction of H.M. Forces overseas led to a reduction in the demand for boarding school places. By 1968–69, the number of boys in the school had fallen to only forty. Pupils at Buxton College had been divided – for the purpose of sporting competition – into "houses", distinguished by particular colours: 'Compton' (Red), 'Spencer' (Yellow) and 'Burlington' (Brown) first recorded in 1921, and later 'Hartington' (Green). From September 1931 the 34 boarders (of a total 192) were formed into a separate house, 'Devonshire' (Blue), and in that year won the Cock House Trophy.

Former pupils of the school (Old Boys) were known as "Old Buxtonians".

== Current use ==
Buxton College finally merged to become first, a Buxton comprehensive school for boys, giving it two campuses, at Kent's Bank (former site of Kent's Bank Secondary Modern Boys School), and College Road (former site of Buxton College). It then successfully merged with the local girls' schools in 1990 to become properly coeducational; these were the former Cavendish Grammar School on Corbar Road and Silverland Secondary Modern School for Girls on Peveril Road: these two sites are now housing estates. The first headmistress of Silverlands Secondary School for Girls was Miss Dorothy Dewis who remained at the school for over twenty years. It formed Buxton Community School at the College Road campus. The School, now as Buxton Community School officially opened on 19 October 1993, is fully coeducational and the historic problem of split sites for the schools of Buxton overcome. The Kent's Bank site became the site for Buxton Library.

== See also ==
- It is not to be confused with High Peak College, a further education college.

== Principals ==
- Dr R. Archibald Little 1888–1910
- H. J. Lawson MA (Cantab)
- A. D. C. Mason (1923–1944)
- R. Bolton King (1944–1970)
- V. T. Middlemas (1970–)

== Staff ==
1968

- E. Leyland (Deputy Headmaster) – Physics
- W. J. Branch – Physics
- K. W. Bland – Maths
- L. Banks – English
- P. W. Bray – Chemistry
- J. B. Cartwright – Sport
- W. V. Cheverst – French
- J. S. Collis – Sport
- W. E. Evans – Latin
- G. Frost – French & Latin
- M. R. L. Loader – RE
- B. Gollop – French
- C. Haslam – Chemistry
- E. R. Jones – Art
- J. C. Lidgate – Maths
- R. A. Lowe – Biology
- J. J. McCarthy
- A. P. Percival – Music & History
- M. J. Rowe – Biology
- D. A. Sadler – English & Physics
- S. B. Smith – Maths
- J. R. Tate – French
- S. A. Tate – Geography
- N. Tatham – Chemistry
- S. Wilkinson – Scripture
- J. W. Wood – English
- R. Walsh – Music
- A. H. Williams – English, Housemaster Devonshire
- ?. Haresnape – History
- G. Morris – Technical Drawing

== Old Buxtonians ==
- John Leonard Clive (1924–1990), historian
- Mark Cocker, author and naturalist
- Herbert Eisner, physicist and author
- Dale Hibbert, musician. Original bass player with The Smiths, author of Boy Interrupted: memoir of a former Smith Boy Interrupted
- Hugh Hickling, author
- Dr Christopher Jackson: Director Security International and Disabled Charity Philanthropist.
- David John Hodgkins, Director, Resources and Planning, Health and Safety Executive,
- Walton Newbold (1888–1943), the first British member of parliament elected as a Communist
- Edmund Ashworth Radford, MP
- Robert Waller, election expert
- Thomas Wright (1859–1936), author
- The Ven John Youens (1914–1993), Chaplain General
- Hugh Sykes (1961–), author, Advertising A to Z Featuring The Blue Willow Pattern 1 & 2 Books held by the Smithsonian and Universities
- Alan Rapley (born 1970) Captain of the Great Britain Swimming Team, Atlanta Olympic Games 1996. Member of British Record Breaking 4 X 100m Freestyle Relay Team.
