= 1987 Truro by-election =

UK parliamentary by-election

- 12 March 1987

Constituency of Truro
- Turnout: 70.2% (▼9.4%)
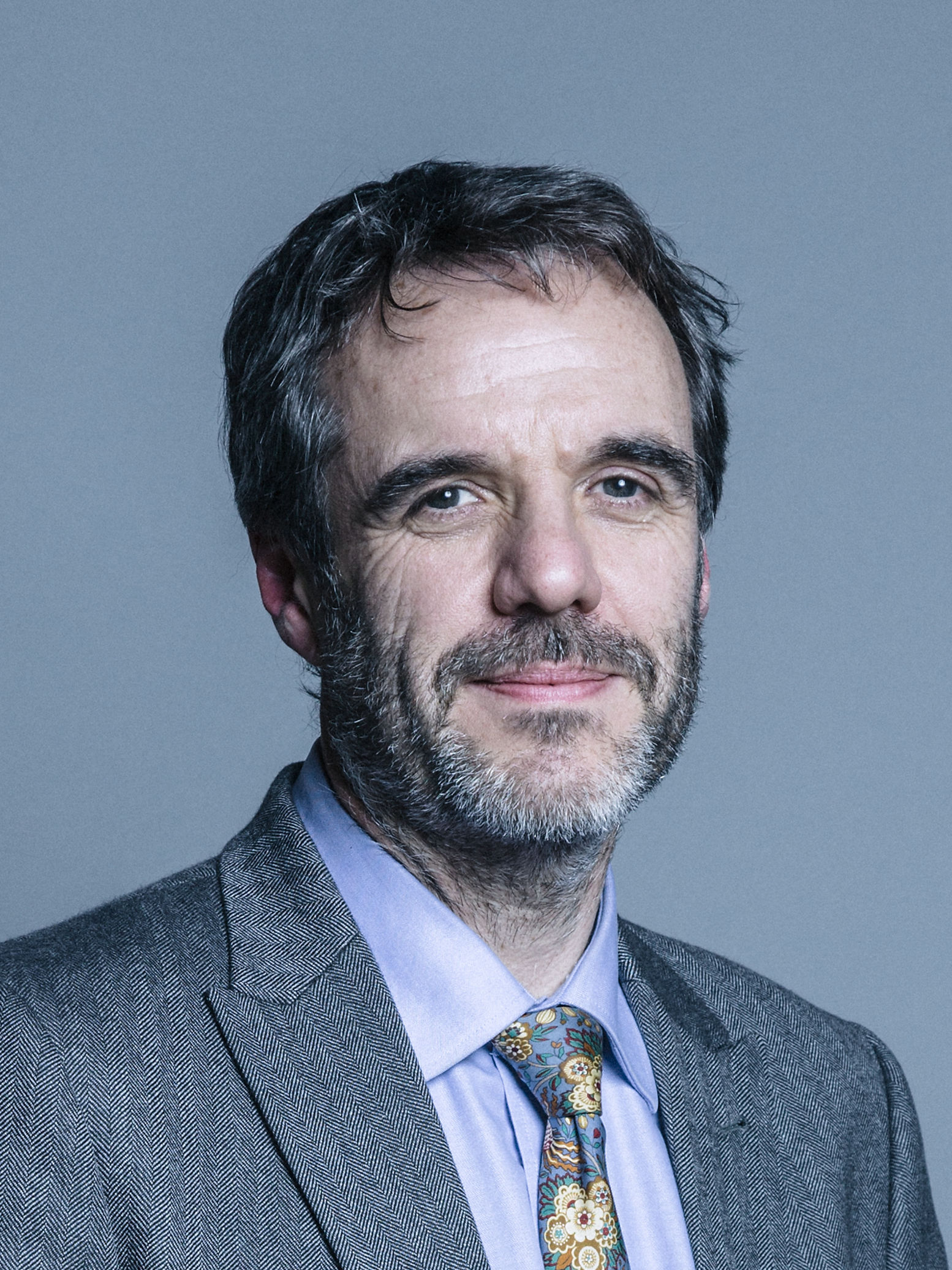
	First party	Second party	Third party
		Con	Lab
Candidate	Matthew Taylor	Nick St Aubyn	John King
Party	Liberal	Conservative	Labour
Popular vote	30,599	15,982	3,603
Percentage	60.4%	31.5%	7.1%
Swing	▲3.1%	▼6.6%	▲2.6%
MP before election
David Penhaligon
Liberal
Subsequent MP
Matthew Taylor
Liberal

The 1987 Truro by-election was caused by the death of David Penhaligon, the Liberal Member of Parliament (MP) for Truro on 22 December 1986 in a car crash near the city. The election was held on 12 March 1987. The constituency was renamed Truro and St Austell in 1997.

The Liberal Party, standing with the backing of the Social Democratic Party as part of the SDP–Liberal Alliance, formed a shortlist of five candidates: Matthew Taylor (Penhaligon's economic policy assistant), Paul Tyler (outgoing chair of the Liberal Party and former MP for Bodmin), Doris Ansari (chair of Cornwall County Council's planning and employment committee), Malcolm Brown (Penhaligon's part-time constituency agent), and Philip Beckerlegge (solicitor and Liberal candidate for Cirencester and Tewkesbury in 1983 and 1987). Taylor was the favourite and was chosen to be the Liberal candidate.

The Conservative candidate was Nick St Aubyn who would go on to become member for Guildford. The Labour Party and Green Party put forward candidates. The only other candidate was Helen Anscomb, who represented Death off Road: Freight on Rail. Anscomb had previously taken part in four other by-elections of the 49th Parliament and on this occasion focused her campaign on the issue of road safety as Penhaligon had been killed in a car accident.

After the election, Anscomb lodged an election petition against the return of Taylor on the grounds that he had appeared on Channel Four News and BBC Newsnight without the other candidates, in breach of election law. The petition was stayed and eventually withdrawn due to her ill-health.

This election is notable for being the last by-election during that term of parliament, as a general election (which saw the Tories achieve a third successive win) was called three months later.

== Result ==
Truro by-election, 1987
Party	Candidate	Votes	%	±%
Alliance (Liberal)	Matthew Taylor	30,599	60.4	+3.1
Conservative	Nick St Aubyn	15,982	31.5	−6.6
Labour	John King	3,603	7.1	+2.5
Green	Howard Hoptrough	403	0.8	New
Death off Road: Freight on Rail	Helen Anscomb	75	0.1	New
Majority		14,617	28.9	+9.7
Turnout		50,662	70.2	−9.4
Alliance hold		Swing	+4.8	
