= Matthew Taylor, Baron Taylor of Goss Moor =

British politician (born 1963)

The Right Honourable The Lord Taylor of Goss Moor
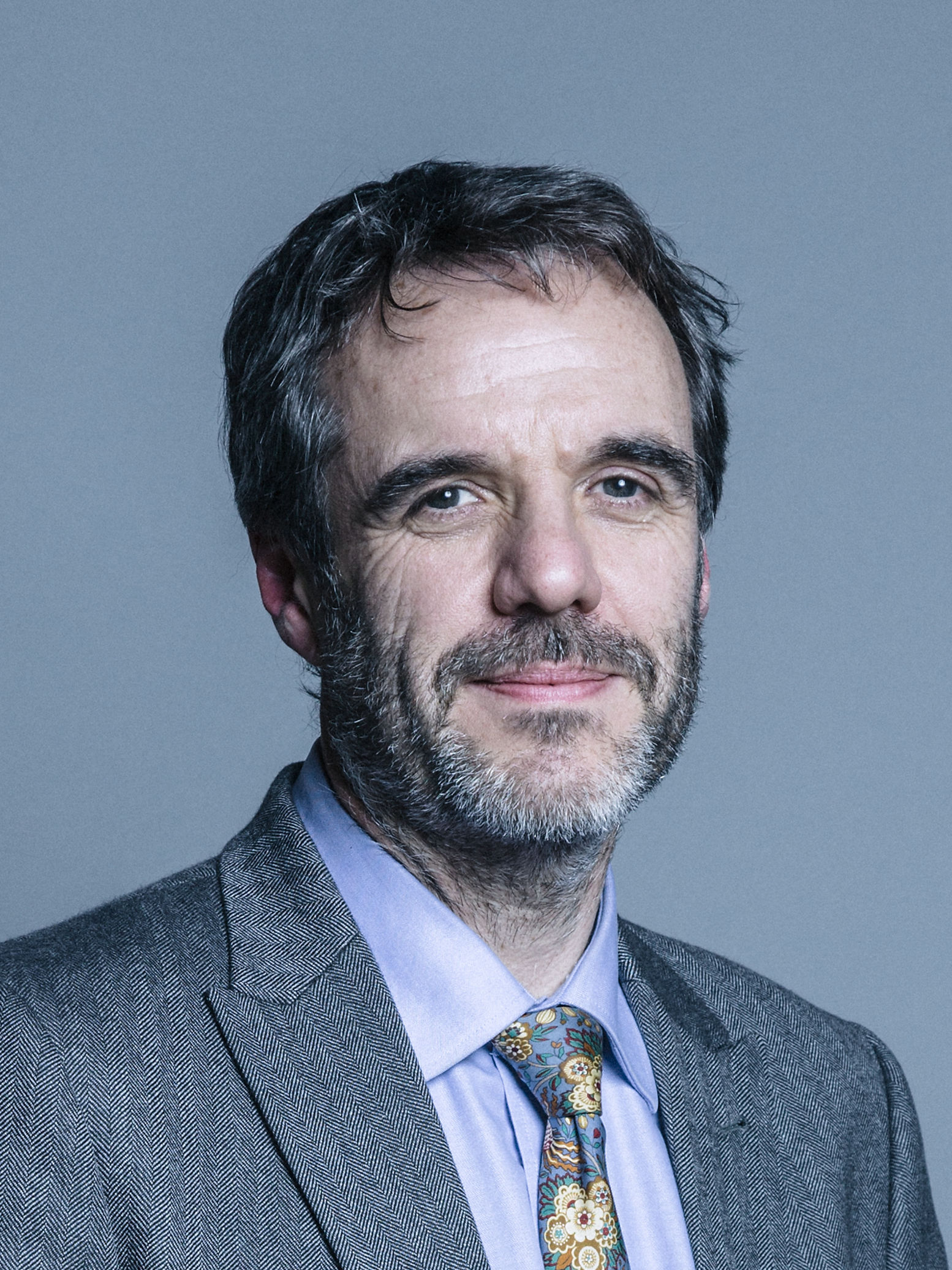
- Official portrait, 2017

Chair of the Liberal Democrats Parliamentary Party
- In office 12 June 2003 – 5 May 2005
- Leader: Charles Kennedy
- Preceded by: Mark Oaten
- Succeeded by: Paul Holmes

Liberal Democrat Treasury spokesperson
- In office 9 August 1999 – 12 June 2003
- Leader: Charles Kennedy
- Preceded by: Malcolm Bruce
- Succeeded by: Vince Cable

Member of the House of Lords
- Lord Temporal
- Life peerage 16 July 2010

Member of Parliament for Truro and St Austell Truro (1987–1997)
- In office 12 March 1987 – 12 April 2010
- Preceded by: David Penhaligon
- Succeeded by: Constituency abolished

Personal details
- Born: 3 January 1963 (age 63)
- Party: Liberal Democrats
- Other political affiliations: Liberal (until 1988)
- Spouse: Vicky Garner (m. 2007; div. 2017)
- Children: 3
- Education: Lady Margaret Hall, Oxford

Matthew Owen John Taylor, Baron Taylor of Goss Moor (born 3 January 1963) is a British politician who has been a life peer in the House of Lords since 2010. A member of the Liberal Democrats, he previously served as the Member of Parliament (MP) for Truro and St Austell (Truro before 1997) in Cornwall from the 1987 Truro by-election until he stood down at the 2010 general election. He was granted a life peerage and so became a member of the House of Lords on 16 July 2010.

Since 2007, Taylor has worked at a national level with successive governments on reforming national planning policy to support more sustainable forms of development and improved community engagement in placemaking. He is best known for his work in support of rural communities including developing neighbourhood planning policy, as well as creating the Government's "Garden Communities" policies for 21st-century sustainable new communities and neighbourhoods.

== Early life ==
Matthew Taylor is the adopted son of Kenneth Taylor, a television script writer best known for several of the BBC's classic drama series, including a number of Jane Austen adaptions, as well as ITV's The Jewel in the Crown and Channel 4's The Camomile Lawn.

In 2008, he traced his birth mother, Margaret Harris, daughter of New Zealand businessman Sir Jack Harris, and learnt that his biological great-grandfather had been another Liberal MP, Sir Percy Harris, who served as Liberal Chief Whip from 1935 to 1945, and Deputy Leader of the Liberal Party from 1940 to 1945.

== Education ==
Taylor was educated first at St Paul's Primary School in Truro and then two independent schools: Treliske Preparatory School (now Truro School Prep) in Highertown, Truro, and University College School in Hampstead, north London. He then won a scholarship to Lady Margaret Hall at the University of Oxford where he read philosophy, politics and economics.

== Life and career ==
Politically active from a young age, Taylor campaigned for Liberal Party Deputy Leader and North Cornwall MP John Pardoe in the 1979 United Kingdom general election at the age of sixteen and joined the Cornwall anti-nuclear alliance a year later to campaign against a nuclear power station proposed to be built in the county. He involved himself in environmental and civil liberties campaigns whilst at sixth form. After winning a scholarship, he studied philosophy, politics, and economics at Lady Margaret Hall, Oxford. At the end of his degree, he was elected as President of the Oxford University Student Union for the year 1985–86 on the Liberal/SDP Alliance ticket.

== Member of Parliament ==
In 1986 he was employed by the Parliamentary Liberal Party as their Economic Policy Researcher and assigned to the then Truro MP David Penhaligon who was the Liberal Party's Treasury Spokesman and Deputy Leader. Penhaligon died in a car crash at the end of that year; Taylor was selected to run as the Liberal candidate in the subsequent by-election, which he won in early 1987. Three months later he retained the seat at the 1987 general election. Aged 24, he was the youngest sitting MP and took the title "Baby of the House" from fellow Alliance MP Charles Kennedy, holding the title for 10 years until 1997.

Following the break-up of the SDP Liberal Alliance in 1987-8 and the new 'Social and Liberal Democratic Party' coming behind the Greens in the 1989 European Elections, Taylor was asked by the new Leader Paddy Ashdown to take on the leadership of Party Communications and relaunch and rebrand the Party. In the role 'Chairman of Communications' (1989–92) he put together and led a small group of outside experts to create the new Liberal Democrats brand and branding, including the new name and the Bird of Liberty logo. Taylor's role was expanded to a new role of 'Chairman of Campaigns and Communications' (1992–94).

From 1990 to 1994 Taylor was also the Party's Education Spokesman, authoring the Liberal Democrats' best-known policy position at that time, to commit to increase basic rate Income Tax for Education. He then moved to be Environment spokesman 1994–7, committing the party to a switch to environment taxes (specifically a carbon tax) mitigated by a cut in VAT. In this role he won the Green Magazine award for 'Most effective environmental MP' in 1996.

Taylor was Campaign Chairman to Charles Kennedy and with his leadership campaign in 1999 after Ashdown stepped down. He was to be made the Liberal Democrat Treasury spokesperson (1999–2003) by Kennedy, and announced the policy of raising the upper rate to 50% for people earning over £100,000. He was asked to lead the preparation of the 2001 General Election manifesto, which he co-authored with Professor Richard Grayson who was then Charles Kennedy's Director of Policy.

After being replaced in the Treasury role by Vince Cable MP in 2003, Taylor became Party Chairman. In this role he returned formally to his leading role in Party Campaigns and Communications, with responsibility for oversight of both the Parliamentary Party's communications team and its policy team, and was again tasked with writing the 2005 General Election manifesto. He was one of a small number of people in the immediate leadership team aware of and attempting to get Kennedy to address his increasing problems with alcohol, eventually giving Kennedy an ultimatum in the approach to the 2005 General Election that if he failed to address the issue he would have to stand down as leader. Following the 2005 election he re-stood for chair of the Liberal Democrats (a role elected by Liberal Democrat MPs) but lost to Paul Holmes by 36 votes to 23. According to a biography of Charles Kennedy, Holmes was seen as a "shop steward" of the backbenches, whereas Taylor was within the leader's inner circle.

== Career after House of Commons ==
In 2006 Taylor stood for the Deputy Leadership role in the Liberal Democrats and was defeated by Vince Cable by one vote. In 2007, he was approached by the new Prime Minister, Gordon Brown to conduct a Rural Economy Review. Taylor negotiated to extend the review to include housing, and to focus it on planning policy reforms. He published this Government Review as "Living Working Countryside' in summer 2008.

Taylor did not seek re-election to parliament in the 2010 General Election. After the 2010 General Election Taylor was appointed a life peerage in the 2010 Dissolution Honours and his title was gazetted as Baron Taylor of Goss Moor, of Truro in the County of Cornwall on 16 July 2010 and sits as a Liberal Democrat peer in the House of Lords.

In 2011–12 he was then asked by Planning Minister Greg Barker and his successor Nick Boles to lead the Government's review of all the planning practice guidance sitting and created a new National Planning Practice Guidance suite. In 2015 he developed his 'Garden Village' proposal, published by Policy Exchange, for enabling local authorities to support new sustainable mixed use communities to meet housing need.

Taylor was chair of the National Housing Federation from 2010 to 2016. He was also elected President of the National Association of Local Councils 2016–18 (representing England's Town and Parish Councils). Taylor has been made an Honorary Member of the RTPI, Visiting professor of Planning at Plymouth University, and Senior Visiting Fellow at Cambridge University's School of Planning

Taylor was a Non-Executive Director of South West Water from 2010 to 2020. He is also Chairman of Kensa Group, a manufacturer and installer of Ground Sourced Heating systems.

== Personal life ==
Taylor married Vicky Garner, a former director of pressure group Surfers Against Sewage, in 2007. The couple have three sons. They divorced in 2017.

Parliament of the United Kingdom
Preceded by David Penhaligon	Member of Parliament for Truro; 1987–1997	Constituency renamed
New constituency	Member of Parliament for Truro & St Austell; 1997–2010	Constituency abolished
Preceded by Charles Kennedy	Baby of the House; 1987–1997	Succeeded by Chris Leslie
Party political offices
Preceded by Mark Oaten	Chair of the Liberal Democrats; 2003–2005	Succeeded by Paul Holmes
Orders of precedence in the United Kingdom
Preceded by The Lord Shipley	Gentlemen; Baron Taylor of Goss Morr	Followed by The Lord Reid of Cardowan
