= Truro School =

Public school in Truro, Cornwall, England

Coordinates: 50°15′39″N 5°02′36″W

Location
- Trennick Lane; Truro, Cornwall, TR1 1TH; England

Information
- Type: Public school Private; Day and boarding
- Motto: Esse quam videri (Latin); To be, rather than to seem to be
- Religious affiliation: Methodist
- Established: 1880
- Headmaster: Andy Johnson
- Gender: Coeducational
- Age: 3 to 18
- Enrolment: 1050~ (2011)
- Houses: 4
- Alumni: Old Truronians
- Website: http://www.truroschool.com/

Truro School is a coeducational private boarding and day school located in the city of Truro, Cornwall, England. It is the largest coeducational independent school in Cornwall with over 1050 pupils, including 240 from Truro Prep, and the sixth form. It is a member school of the Headmasters' and Headmistresses' Conference.

== History ==
Truro Wesleyan Middle Class College (referred to as Truro College) was founded by Wesleyan Methodists in November 1879, and on 20 January 1880 lessons began at sites in River Street and Strangways Terrace, Truro. The present site was completed in 1882. The school was founded as an alternative to the Church of England's ancient Truro Grammar School. The name Truro College was changed to Truro School in 1931 when it was considered that it was "pretentious...to claim the style of "College" if its pupils are for the most part below the age of 18". The preparatory department was opened in 1936. Girls were admitted into the sixth form in 1976, and it became fully co-educational in 1990. In 2005, a history of the school entitled High on the Hill was produced by Joanna Wood to commemorate its 125th anniversary.

There have been 12 headmasters appointed since the foundation of the school 141 years ago:

- George Turner (1880–1887),
- Thomas Jackson (1887–1890),
- Herbert Vinter (1890–1921),
- Egbert H. Magson (1921–1946),
- A. Lowry Creed (1946–1959),
- Derek Burrell (1959–1986)
- Barry Hobbs (1986–1991),
- Brian Jackson, Acting Headmaster (1991–1992),
- Guy Dodd (1992–2001),
- Paul Smith (2001–2012),
- Andrew Gordon-Brown (2013–2020)
- Andy Johnson (2020–)

== Admission and fees ==
Pupils must sit an entrance exam, the equivalent of an 11+ exam, although some pupils take the equivalent 13+ exam as certain local schools still teach up to year 9 (year 3). Academic, and occasionally music, artistic or sports scholarships, are also awarded as well as are means-tested bursaries. Current fees per term range from £3,200 - £4,500 at the Prep School for Nursery and Prep day pupils to £4,900 for senior school day pupils and £9,700 - £10,600 for full boarders.

In November 2005 the school was one of 50 private schools found guilty of running an illegal price-fixing cartel, exposed by The Times, which had resulted in them increasing fees for thousands of parents. Each school was required to pay a nominal penalty of £10,000, and all agreed to make an ex-gratia payment, collectively totalling £3 million, into a trust designed to benefit pupils who attended the schools during the period where the fee information was shared. Headmaster Paul Smith said that the school had acted "unwittingly". "This ... systematic exchange of confidential information as to intended fee increases was anti-competitive and resulted in parents being charged higher fees than would otherwise be the case," the Office of Fair Trading said.

== Houses ==
Each pupil is placed into a school 'house' used for inter-school competitions and sports matches:

- School
- Smith
- Vinter
- Wickett

The four houses compete for the Opie Shield over many sporting events for boys, girls and mixed teams across all year groups.

== Boarding ==
Though the majority of students are day-pupils, there are also some 80 boarders, of whom half are from overseas, including German exchange students who spend up to three terms in the Lower Sixth.

The school has three boarding houses, one for boys and two for girls:

- Malvern – Senior girls, Sixth form, ages 16–18
- Pentreve – Junior girls, first–fifth year, ages 11–15
- Trennick – Boys, first–fifth year, and Sixth form, ages 11–18

Trennick is the only boarding house situated in the school's original main building, although the other two are on the campus. They are family-run communities with married resident house staff and other teachers who live on site. Temporary and 'flexi-boarding' are also available.

== Preparatory and pre-preparatory school ==
Truro School has its own feeder co-ed school for the age group 3–11. Originally named Treliske School, it was founded in 1936 and is situated within the grounds of Truro Golf Course, and is adjacent to Treliske Hospital. It was now called Truro Prep School. Originally a boys school, it became co-educational in 1989. The building to accommodate Willday House, the Pre-Preparatory School originally located in Trennick Lane, was added in 1991. In 2010 an extension to double the size of the Willday House was completed to accommodate an increased demand for Pre-Prep pupils. Entry is academically selective and there were 240 pupils (135 boys, 105 girls) in the 2008–09 academic year. 2018 fees range from £2965to £4330 per term. There have been 6 head teachers in 88 years since the school was established in 1936: Tommy Stratton: 1936 – 1960, Alan Ayers: 1960 – 1989, Russell Hollins: 1989 – 2004, Matthew Lovett: 2004 – 2016, Sarah Patterson: 2016 – 2023 and Robert Morse: 2023–present.

== Notable alumni ==
Notable alumni of Truro School include:

- Robert Shaw, actor
- Roger Taylor, Queen drummer
- John Rhys-Davies, actor.
- Nigel Terry, actor.
- Lawrence Ng, actor.
- Geoffrey Healey, automobile designer.
- Benjamin Luxon, opera singer.
- Alan Opie, opera singer.
- John Kendall-Carpenter, England international rugby union captain.
- George Eustice, former member of Parliament.
- Paul Myners, businessman and former government minister.
- John Curtice, professor of politics at University of Strathclyde.
- Ben Ainslie, olympic sailor and four times gold medallist.
- Michael Adams, chess grandmaster.
- Patrick Vallance, chief scientific adviser to the government of the United Kingdom
- Ros Atkins, BBC journalist, broadcaster and DJ
