= Anne Milton =

British Independent politician (born 1955)

The Right Honourable Anne Milton
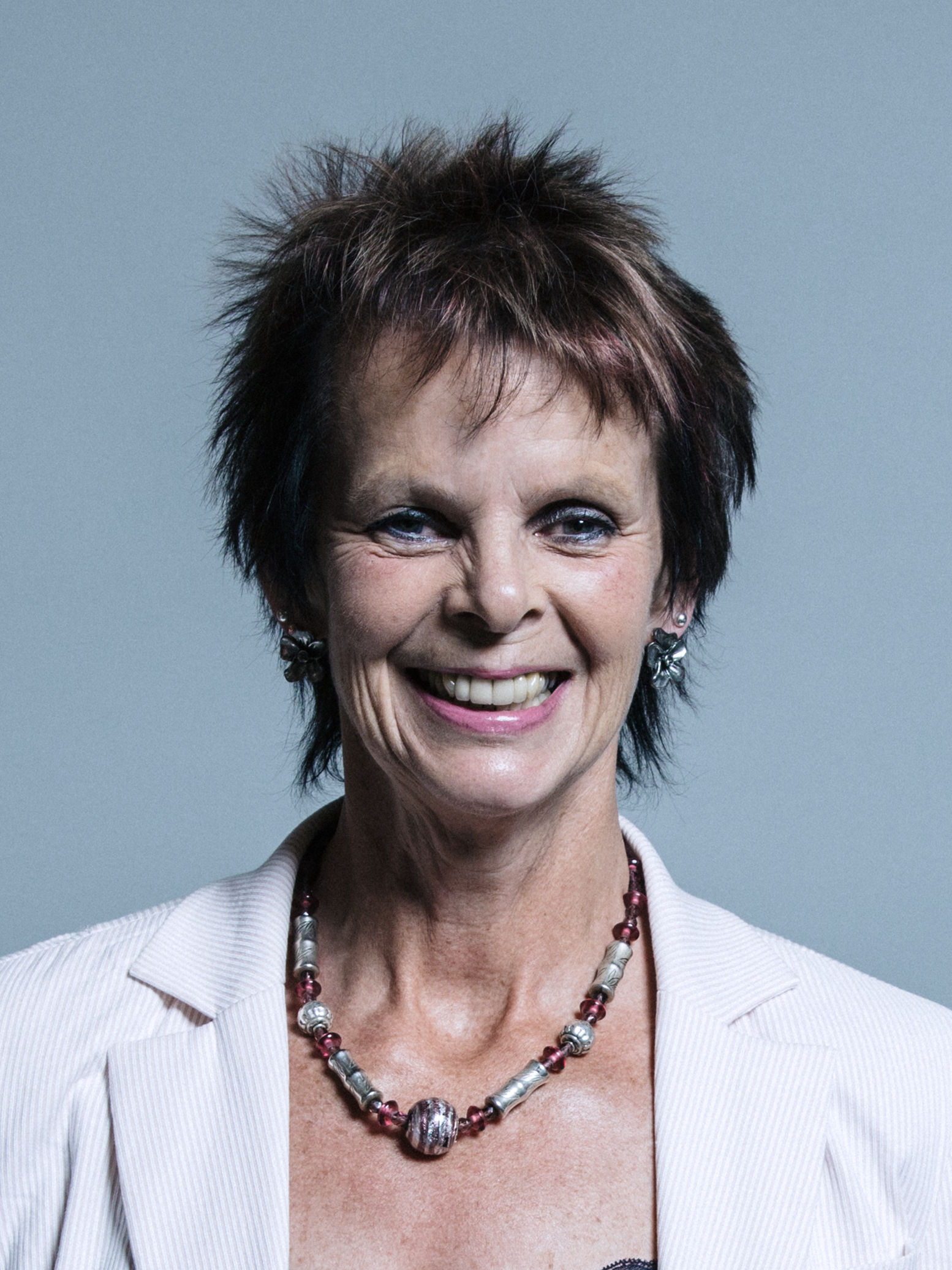
- Official portrait, 2017

Minister of State for Skills and Apprenticeships
- In office 12 June 2017 – 23 July 2019
- Prime Minister: Theresa May
- Preceded by: Robert Halfon
- Succeeded by: Gillian Keegan

Minister for Women
- In office 12 June 2017 – 8 January 2018
- Prime Minister: Theresa May
- Preceded by: Nicky Morgan (Note: Office vacant between 9 April 2014 and 12 June 2017.)
- Succeeded by: Victoria Atkins

Deputy Chief Government Whip Treasurer of the Household
- In office 11 May 2015 – 12 June 2017
- Prime Minister: David Cameron; Theresa May
- Preceded by: Greg Hands
- Succeeded by: Julian Smith

Vice-Chamberlain of the Household
- In office 14 July 2014 – 11 May 2015
- Prime Minister: David Cameron
- Preceded by: Desmond Swayne
- Succeeded by: Kris Hopkins

Lord Commissioner of the Treasury
- In office 4 September 2012 – 14 July 2014
- Prime Minister: David Cameron
- Preceded by: Angela Watkinson
- Succeeded by: Gavin Barwell

Parliamentary Under-Secretary of State for Public Health
- In office 11 May 2010 – 4 September 2012
- Prime Minister: David Cameron
- Preceded by: Gillian Merron (Note: As Minister of State.)
- Succeeded by: Anna Soubry

Member of Parliament for Guildford
- In office 5 May 2005 – 6 November 2019
- Preceded by: Sue Doughty
- Succeeded by: Angela Richardson

Personal details
- Born: Anne Frances Turner; 3 November 1955 (age 70) Sussex, England
- Party: Independent (2019–present)
- Other political affiliations: Conservative (2005–2019)
- Spouses: Neil Milton (m. 1979, divorced) Graham Henderson (m. 2000)
- Children: 4, including Nikki Henderson
- Education: Haywards Heath Grammar School; City University
- Website: Official website

Anne Frances Milton (née Turner; born 3 November 1955) is a British former politician and lobbyist who served as Minister of State for Skills and Apprenticeships from 2017 to 2019. She was Member of Parliament (MP) for Guildford from 2005 to 2019. Elected as a Conservative, she had the whip removed in September 2019 and subsequently sat as an independent politician.

== Early life and career ==
Anne Frances Turner was born on 3 November 1955 in Sussex, England to Patrick and Nesta Turner. She attended Haywards Heath Grammar School in West Sussex. She trained as a nurse at St Bartholomew's Hospital in London and obtained a diploma in district nursing from the London South Bank University. Milton worked for the NHS for 25 years as a nurse which included working in primary care, research and supporting palliative care nurses. During the 1980s, she was a shop steward for the Royal College of Nursing.

Milton was a councillor for the Borough of Reigate and Banstead from 1999 to 2004 and was Conservative Group leader on the council from 2000 to 2003 and a member of the South East England Regional Assembly. She applied to go on the Conservative Party's list of Parliamentary candidates in 1999 and was shortlisted in the selections for Bexhill and Battle and for Bridgwater but was not selected for a seat for the 2001 general election.

== Parliamentary career ==
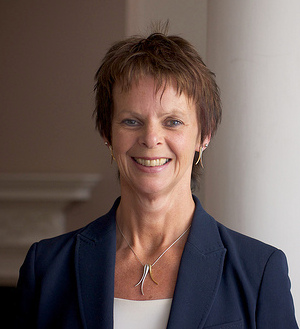
Milton as a Whip

Milton was selected to contest the Guildford parliamentary constituency in the 2005 general election, a seat which the Conservatives had unexpectedly lost in 2001 to the Liberal Democrat Sue Doughty with the constituency becoming a marginal. She was elected as the MP for Guildford at the 2005 general election with a margin of victory of 347 votes.

After the election, she was appointed to the Health Select Committee serving till December 2006. During the 2005–2010 parliament, Milton worked as the Shadow Minister for Tourism from November 2006 and then the Shadow Minister for Health in July 2007. In February 2006, Milton was among a minority of Conservative MPs to oppose exceptions for private clubs from the proposed Smoking ban in England. Milton had previously announced her opposition to a partial ban, stating it was "the worst possible solution".

Milton held her seat in the 2010 general election and increased her majority to 7,782 votes (14%). In July 2010, Milton suggested that doctors should describe obese patients as 'fat' to encourage them to take responsibility for their condition. This was criticised by campaigners who pointed out that a clinical definition was being replaced with a subjective, pejorative term.

During the 2010–2015 parliament, she served as Parliamentary Under-Secretary at the Department of Health. As part of this role, she led the government's response to the outgoing Prime Minister's independent commission into nursing and midwifery Front Line Care (2010 Report); the rather limited response being published in April 2011. As a result of a ministerial reshuffle in September 2012, Milton was appointed a Government Whip (Lord Commissioner of HM Treasury), Vice-Chamberlain of the Household and later Treasurer of the Household. “You have to know the MPs very well,” Milton said of her time in the Whips' Office. “If you’re working successfully, it doesn’t necessarily mean that you can avoid a rebellion but you should always be able to predict a vote spot-on, or at the very worst one or two out.”

She abstained on the parliamentary vote on the legalisation of same sex marriage in February 2013 citing a lack of consensus amongst her constituents. In March 2015, she was appointed to the Privy Council of the United Kingdom and therefore granted the title The Right Honourable. She voted for the United Kingdom to remain with the European Union (EU) in the June 2016 membership referendum. Milton was re-elected as MP for Guildford in the 2017 snap general election. Following the election, she was selected as the Minister of State for Skills and Apprenticeships and the Minister for Women.

On 23 October 2018, Milton resigned from the Commons Reference Group on Representation and Inclusion, chaired by Commons speaker John Bercow, citing incompetence in Bercow's ability to tackle bullying and sexual harassment problems in Parliament.

On 23 July 2019, Milton resigned as Minister of State for Skills and Apprenticeships shortly before Boris Johnson was announced as the new leader of the Conservative Party and, thus, Prime Minister. She said that she could not serve in a government which said there was a possibility of the UK leaving the European Union with no deal. She had the whip removed in September 2019 and subsequently sat as an independent politician. She stood for re-election in the 2019 general election as an independent and lost to the Conservative candidate Angela Richardson.

== Post-political career ==
In 2021, Milton joined KPMG as an associate. In 2022, Milton joined lobbying firm PLMR as an advisor.

== Personal life ==
She married her first husband Neil Milton in 1979 in Haywards Heath; the couple later divorced. Her second husband, Dr Graham Henderson, whom she married in February 2000 in Surrey, is a former local medical director at Virgin Healthcare. Milton lives in Surrey and has four children, one of whom is yachtswoman Nikki Henderson.

== Notes ==
Parliament of the United Kingdom
Preceded by Sue Doughty	Member of Parliament for Guildford; 2005–2019	Succeeded by Angela Richardson
Political offices
Preceded by Don Foster; Greg Hands	Deputy Chief Whip of the House of Commons; 2015–2017	Succeeded by Julian Smith
Preceded by Greg Hands	Treasurer of the Household; 2015–2017	Succeeded by Julian Smith
Party political offices
Preceded by Greg Hands	Conservative Deputy Chief Whip in the House of Commons; 2015–2017	Succeeded by Julian Smith
