= Liberal Democrat Christian Forum =

Christian organisation affiliated with the Liberal Democrats

- Abbreviation: LDCF
- Chair: Olivia Honeyman
- Director: Elizabeth Jewkes
- President: Tim Farron
- Vice President(s): Baroness Sal Brinton; Jane Dodds; Sir Simon Hughes
- Affiliations: Liberal Democrats
- Website: Official website

The Liberal Democrat Christian Forum (LDCF) is an association within the Liberal Democrats that aims to support Christians within the party and promote the party to other Christians. Its aim is to encourage and enable Christians in their constructive work in politics, being ‘a voice of Christian faith in the Liberal Democrats, and a voice of Liberal Democracy among Christians.’ LDCF believes that Christians should get involved in politics as a way of living out their faith and caring for the oppressed in society.

The LDCF works with Christians of all denominations, as well as with Christian groups from other major political parties. It offers a forum for debate among members, holds prayer meetings within the Houses of Parliament and events throughout the year.

Our Team.
