= David Penhaligon =

British politician (1944–1986)

President of the Liberal Party
- In office 1985–1986
- Leader: David Steel
- Preceded by: Alan Watson
- Succeeded by: Des Wilson

Liberal frontbench team
- In office 1985 – 22 December 1986
- Leader: David Steel

Member of Parliament for Truro
- In office 10 October 1974 – 22 December 1986
- Preceded by: Piers Dixon
- Succeeded by: Matthew Taylor

Personal details
- Born: 6 June 1944 Truro, Cornwall, England, UK
- Died: 22 December 1986 (aged 42) Probus, Cornwall
- Party: Liberal
- Spouse: Annette Lidgey (m. 1968)

David Charles Penhaligon (6 June 1944 – 22 December 1986) was a British politician from Cornwall who was Liberal Member of Parliament for Truro from October 1974 until his death in 1986. He was a popular figure in all parties, and was seen by many as a potential future front-runner for the party leadership until his sudden death in a traffic collision.

== Background ==
Penhaligon was born on D-Day at Truro Nursing Home and was brought up in Truro. He was a cousin of actress Susan Penhaligon. He attended Truro School, and then Cornwall Technical College where he studied mechanical engineering. Penhaligon worked for Holman Brothers in Camborne as a research and development engineer working on rock drilling. As an interesting anecdote, he was also a part-time DJ in Truro, where he once encountered 14 year old Roger Taylor, subsequently the Queen drummer. This happened at a musical event, that he compered in Truro City Hall, during 1964. By 1973 he had qualified as a Chartered Mechanical Engineer; he also took over from his father a sub-post office in Chacewater from 1967 (after his marriage in 1968 to Annette Lidgey, she ran the business). His Liberal activities led to some work in local broadcasting.

Penhaligon's decision to join the Liberal Party was inspired in 1963 when, aged 19, he was an important witness to a murder case. His evidence, which supported the case of the defendant Dennis Whitty, was not enough to prevent Whitty from being convicted and hanged. Penhaligon was appalled by the practice of capital punishment. He led the Truro Young Liberals and built up the local party (which had been the weakest in Cornwall) into one of the strongest; he was the chair of the Cornish Young Liberals from 1966 to 1968. However he was not selected as Liberal candidate for Truro in the 1966 general election (nor for any other seat), and he was also rejected for Falmouth and Camborne in 1968 apparently because his strong Cornish accent was thought unattractive.

In the 1970 general election he fought the Devon constituency of Totnes when the previous candidate Paul Tyler transferred to Bodmin. He polled poorly in the context of an election in which the party as a whole suffered. However, Penhaligon had acquired useful experience of fighting election campaigns and picked up additional tips from Wallace Lawler's practices in inner-city Birmingham.

== Campaigning in Truro ==
In 1971, Penhaligon was easily selected as candidate for Truro, a seat which did not look an easier prospect than Totnes. This gave him three years in which to get his name known and meet his prospective constituents (a practice known as "nursing" a constituency) and when the election came in February 1974 he won nearly 21,000 votes and cut the majority of the sitting Conservative MP to 2,561. Truro became the fourth "target" constituency for the Liberals for the next election – which would take place within months because of the inconclusive outcome in February.

== Parliamentary career ==
Penhaligon was readopted and worked on trying to persuade the remaining Labour voters in the seat to back him. In the October 1974 election he was elected with a majority of 464 votes – the only Liberal gain of that election. Due to House of Commons rules on "offices of profit under the crown" he transferred his sub-postmastership to his wife. In Parliament he swiftly won a reputation for humorous speeches, urging a national minimum wage and increased state pensions. He voted for fellow Cornish MP John Pardoe over David Steel in the Liberal leadership election of 1976. He was hard to place in conventional political terms: he changed his mind over capital punishment, initially voting against in December 1974, but supporting it in December 1975.

Although frequently speaking on national issues, it was clear that Penhaligon's main concern was local. He became known in particular for defending the Cornish tin mining industry and the local fishing fleets. He spoke with conviction and knowledge about the problems of rural areas in Cornwall with road fuel costs and inadequate infrastructure.

=== Tourism, ice cream and deckchairs ===
In a speech made at Camborne in support of the miners he famously said:

You need more in an economy than just tourism, ice cream and deckchairs. Our mining industry is not a figment of the last decade or the last two decades. It has occupied Cornishmen and it has produced wealth for this century, the previous century and probably the last two thousand years; and what we're asking the government to do is to recognise the great contribution we have made for the wealth of Britain, and in this time of great trial and tribulation to come to our assistance – that's what we're asking our government to do.

== Lib-Lab pact ==
When the Lib–Lab pact was first mooted in March 1977, Penhaligon was initially opposed and spoke against it. He later came round and told the Liberal Assembly in September 1977 that it had achieved an "economic revolution". At a special Assembly in January 1978 he was a star speaker in persuading the delegates representing Liberal members to continue the pact. The pact allowed the Liberals to influence government legislation and Penhaligon objected to proposals from Tony Benn for an Electricity Industry Bill which would centralise control, which single-handedly prevented any progress.

Part of Penhaligon's support for the Lib-Lab pact was his fear that an early general election would result in a poor performance for the Liberals, and his own seat might be vulnerable. In October 1978 after the pact had lapsed, he explained that "Turkeys don't volunteer for Christmas!". The scandal over former party leader Jeremy Thorpe, who was charged with conspiracy to murder in August 1978, was a matter of particular concern and Penhaligon urged Thorpe to stand down and the Liberal Party not to endorse him. When Thorpe did seek re-election, Penhaligon refused to help his campaign.

Despite his narrow majority and the belief that he was the most vulnerable of the Liberal MPs, Penhaligon kept his seat with a much larger majority (8,708) in the 1979 general election. Against the Conservative government, he strongly opposed nuclear power. Against the majority of Liberal Party members he strongly supported NATO and nuclear weapons, describing a separate European non-nuclear defence as "akin to a behaving like a virgin in a brothel", although he supported demands for "dual key control" of United States cruise missiles based in Britain.

== In the Alliance ==
Penhaligon supported the SDP–Liberal Alliance from the start, although he resented SDP attempts to take control of the Liberal Party's target seats. He was named in January 1982 as one of the 'firemen' who would sort out any disagreements between the parties (John Horam was his SDP counterpart). He was particularly prominent and impressive in the 1983 election campaign in which he spoke for the Liberal Party on Transport, Industry and Energy; Hugo Young described him as having "a closer grasp of national electoral politics ... than any other Liberal MP". Following the election he became an early proponent of a merger between the SDP and the Liberals under a single leader, largely to avoid disputes over allocations of Parliamentary seats.

== Death and legacy ==
From 1983 Penhaligon headed the Liberal by-election unit which planned the campaigns in individual seats. At the Liberal Assembly in September 1984 he was chosen as President-elect of the Liberal Party (the first sitting MP to be elected to the post), and served as Party President from 1985 to 1986. This carried with it the job of presiding over the Liberal Assembly at the end of his term, which saw a party split over defence policy and whether to support nuclear weapons; Penhaligon did not intervene, something he regretted afterwards.

He was appointed as Chief spokesman on the economy in 1985; though admitting he had no financial experience, he challenged the Conservative policy on privatisation and monetarism. He was a central figure in planning the Alliance general election campaign at the time of his death.

At 6.45 am on 22 December 1986, he was travelling to a post office to meet workers there when a van skidded on an icy road and hit his Rover SD1 car near Truck Fork, Probus, Cornwall. Penhaligon was pronounced dead at the scene. The van driver was not prosecuted for the accident. The inquest held in March 1987 strongly suggested that Penhaligon was not wearing a seat belt at the time of the crash, nor was the driver of the van, who was thrown out of his vehicle and suffered two broken legs as a result. Penhaligon's injuries were extensive fracture of his ribs and fracture of the neck vertebrae. The cause of death was damage to the aorta as well as massive damage to the spleen and liver.

From July 1986, Penhaligon had employed Matthew Taylor, a University of Oxford graduate, as his research assistant on the economy; Taylor was selected to follow him as Liberal candidate for Truro and was duly returned in the 1987 Truro by-election.

Penhaligon's widow wrote his biography in 1989; his son Matthew has previously been an active member of the Liberal Democrats and was the party's candidate for the Mayoralty of Hackney in May 2006.

== Penhaligon Award ==
The Liberal Democrats remember Penhaligon's ability to recruit and enthuse members through the Penhaligon Award, a trophy presented annually at the party's autumn party conference to the Local Party which demonstrates the greatest increase in party membership together with activities to develop and involve members and activists.

== Bibliography ==
- Andrew Roth, 'David Penhaligon' in 'Parliamentary Profiles L-R' (Parliamentary Profiles Service, London, 1985), ISBN 0-900582-23-5
- Annette Penhaligon, 'Penhaligon' (Bloomsbury, London, 1989), ISBN 0-7475-0501-2

Parliament of the United Kingdom
Preceded by Piers Dixon	Member of Parliament for Truro; October 1974 – 1986	Succeeded by Matthew Taylor
Party political offices
Preceded by Alan Watson	President of the Liberal Party; 1985–1986	Succeeded by Des Wilson
