= 2017 Liberal Democrats deputy leadership election =

- 20 June 2017
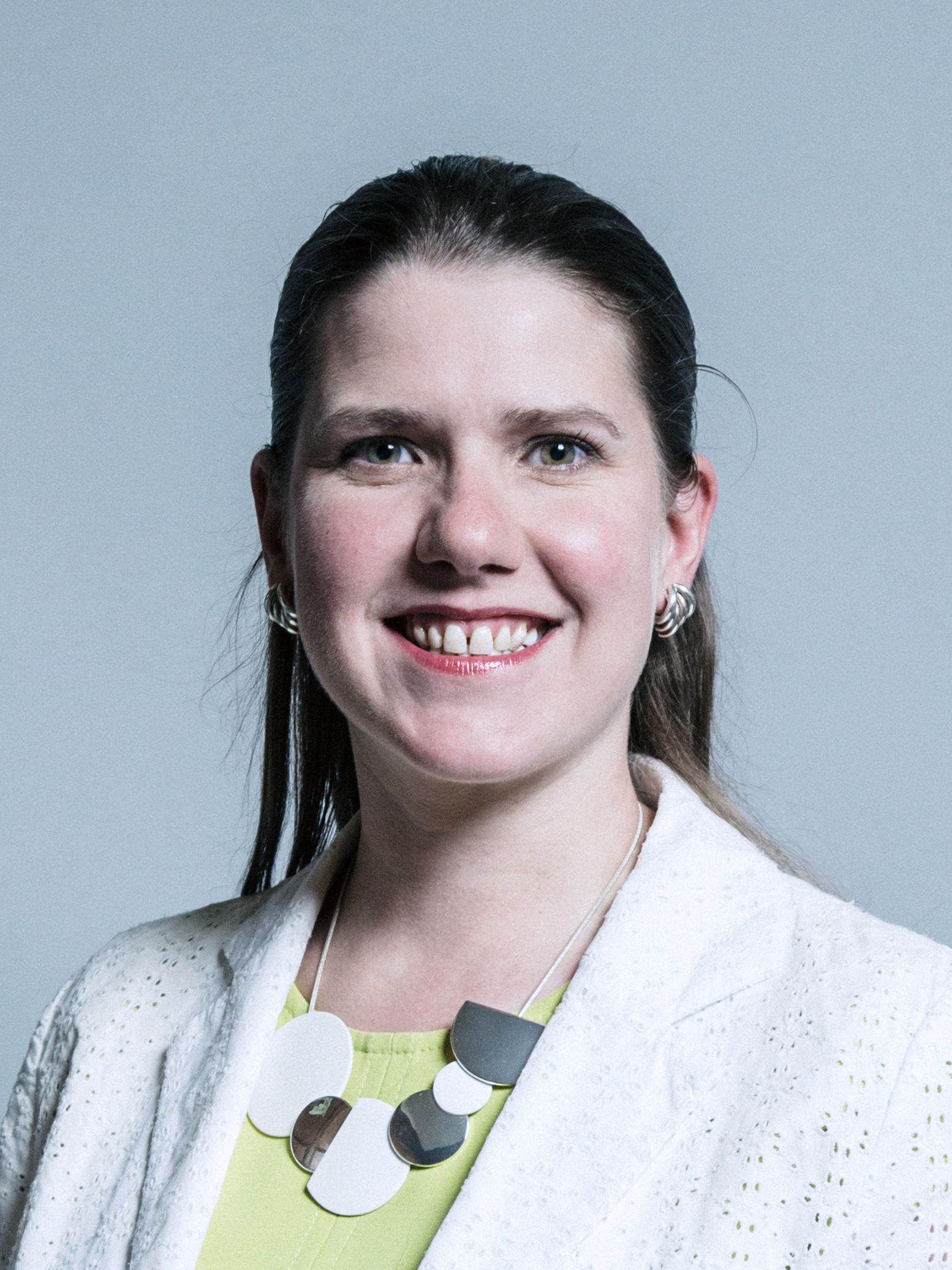
Candidate	Jo Swinson
Popular vote	Unopposed
Deputy Leader before election
Vacant (office last held by Malcolm Bruce)
Elected Deputy Leader
Jo Swinson

The 2017 Liberal Democrats deputy leadership election was announced on 14 June 2017, and Jo Swinson was elected unopposed on 20 June.

== Timeline ==
Following a meeting of the parliamentary party on 12 June 2017, nominations for the deputy leader role were opened. Nominations closed on 20 June, and Jo Swinson was elected unopposed, having been the only nominee at the close of nominations.

Had there been a contest, there would have been a hustings at the parliamentary party meeting on 27 June 2017, and following the hustings the election would have been decided through a secret ballot of the parliamentary party using the alternative vote method.

== Background ==
Tim Farron was elected as party leader, defeating Norman Lamb, in July 2015. Kate Parminter and Navnit Dholakia were elected deputy leaders of the party's House of Lords group in June 2015.

The position of Deputy Leader of the Liberal Democrats has never formally existed. Since the party's foundation, the Parliamentary Party in the House of Commons has elected a Deputy Leader. Although often referred to as Deputy Leader of the Liberal Democrats, this post is actually only Deputy Leader of the Liberal Democrat Parliamentary Party in the House of Commons, not of the Liberal Democrats as a whole.

When the last Deputy Leader of the Liberal Democrats in the House of Commons, Sir Malcolm Bruce, stood down at the 2015 general election, held on 7 May, the remaining Liberal Democrat MPs did not elect a Deputy Leader.

== Election rules ==
=== Current rules ===
Under current rules, there is no position of "Deputy Leader of the Liberal Democrats", however the party's MPs could (and until 2015 did) elect a Deputy Leader of the Liberal Democrat Parliamentary Party in the House of Commons. Following the 2015 general election, when the party returned eight Members of Parliament in the House of Commons, the Parliamentary Party in the House of Commons did not elect a Deputy Leader.

=== Discussion of change during the 2015 leadership election ===
Both candidates in the 2015 leadership election called for a change in the rules for choosing a Deputy Leader to make it possible for a woman to be elected to the role, on the grounds that requiring the Deputy Leader to be an MP would exclude any woman from candidacy as, at the time, all eight of the party's MPs were men.

On 15 May 2015, leadership candidate Norman Lamb MP proposed a change to the rules that would mean that the Deputy Leader is elected by all Party members on a one member one vote basis, with the explicit purpose of ensuring that the deputy leader is a woman, suggesting to Party members' website Liberal Democrat Voice that "she could be one of the former or future colleagues mentioned below; a peer, a member of a devolved chamber or the European Parliament; a leading councillor or seasoned campaigner."

On 5 June 2015, Tim Farron, the subsequent winner of the leadership contest, told The Guardian that he wanted the Deputy Leader to be a woman and that he wanted 50% of the Liberal Democrat front bench team to be women; the paper reported that this "would require a change to the Party's constitution".

=== Proposed constitutional amendment ===
In August 2015, a proposed amendment to the Liberal Democrats' party constitution was published on the agenda of the 2015 Autumn Conference held in Bournemouth. This amendment, which was debated on 22 September, would have abolished the power of the Liberal Democrats' MPs to choose a Deputy Leader and instead reconstituted the position of Deputy Leader of the Liberal Democrats as a directly elected post.

This post was to be elected by one member one vote in the same way as the Leader, with nominations open to all members of the Party who must be "supported by 200 members in aggregate in no fewer than 20 Local Parties". The amendment did not set a specific date by which the deputy leadership election would have been held, if passed. After nearly an hour of debate, the amendment was referred back to the Governance Review for further consideration by a vote of 218–167.

The Governance Review, presented to the 2016 Autumn Conference held in Brighton, reported the following to Conference:

After the General Election some members proposed that the party should elect a Deputy Leader from the wider membership, rather than the parliamentary party in the Commons. Members' responses to the consultation have been mixed: whilst keen on a wider democratic mandate, there was recognition that the Leader would have to be able to work with the Deputy, and there were conflicting responses as well as a degree of confusion as to their potential role.

Some suggested the Deputy Leader should be elected, others thought that the Leader should be able to choose their deputy. The Federal Executive is therefore offering members two choices to vote on at conference. The first is [that] a Deputy Leader is a parliamentarian (including Scottish and Welsh representatives as well as those in Westminster or the European Parliament) elected at the same time as a Leader on a joint ticket, with arrangements in place in the event that the Deputy resigns mid-term.

The second is that the Deputy Leader is elected by the Parliamentary Party in the House of Commons from among their number.

With both proposed choices placed onto the Conference agenda as constitutional amendments, Conference chose to adopt the second choice, with the Deputy Leader being elected by the Parliamentary Party in the House of Commons from among themselves, if they so choose. The successful amendment also provides that if the position of Leader falls vacant, then the Deputy Leader or, if no such post exists, the Chief Whip, will assume the post of Acting Leader until a new Leader is elected.

== Candidates ==
- Jo Swinson, MP for East Dunbartonshire from 2005 to 2015 and since 2017, and Junior Equalities Minister from 2012 to 2015.

== Result ==
Following the close of nominations, only Jo Swinson was officially nominated, and was elected unopposed.

== See also ==
- 2015 Liberal Democrats leadership election
- 2017 Liberal Democrats leadership election
- 2019 Liberal Democrats leadership election
