= 2015 Liberal Democrats leadership election =

UK political party leadership election

- 8 May – 16 July 2015
- Turnout: 56.0% (▼8.1%)
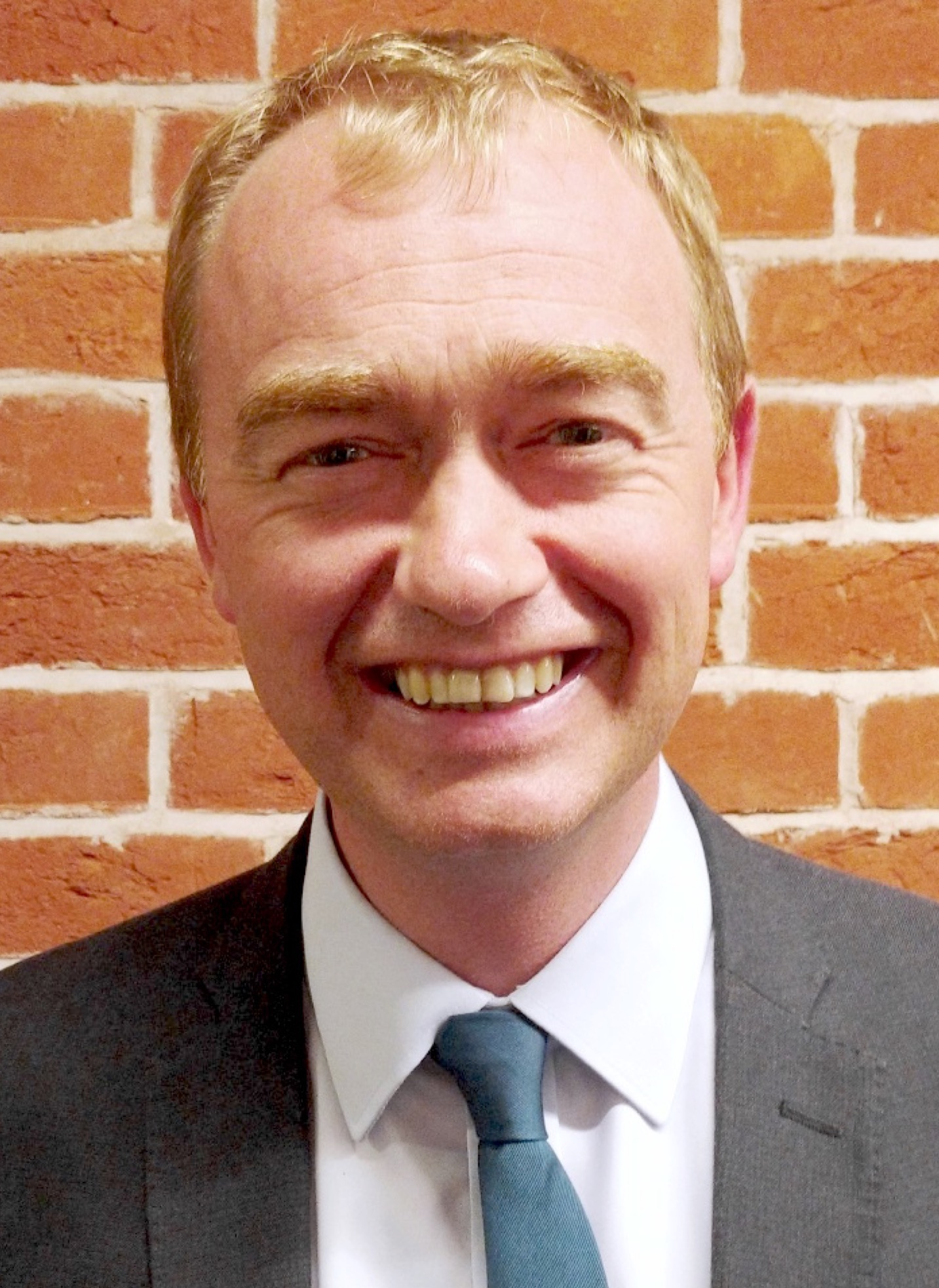

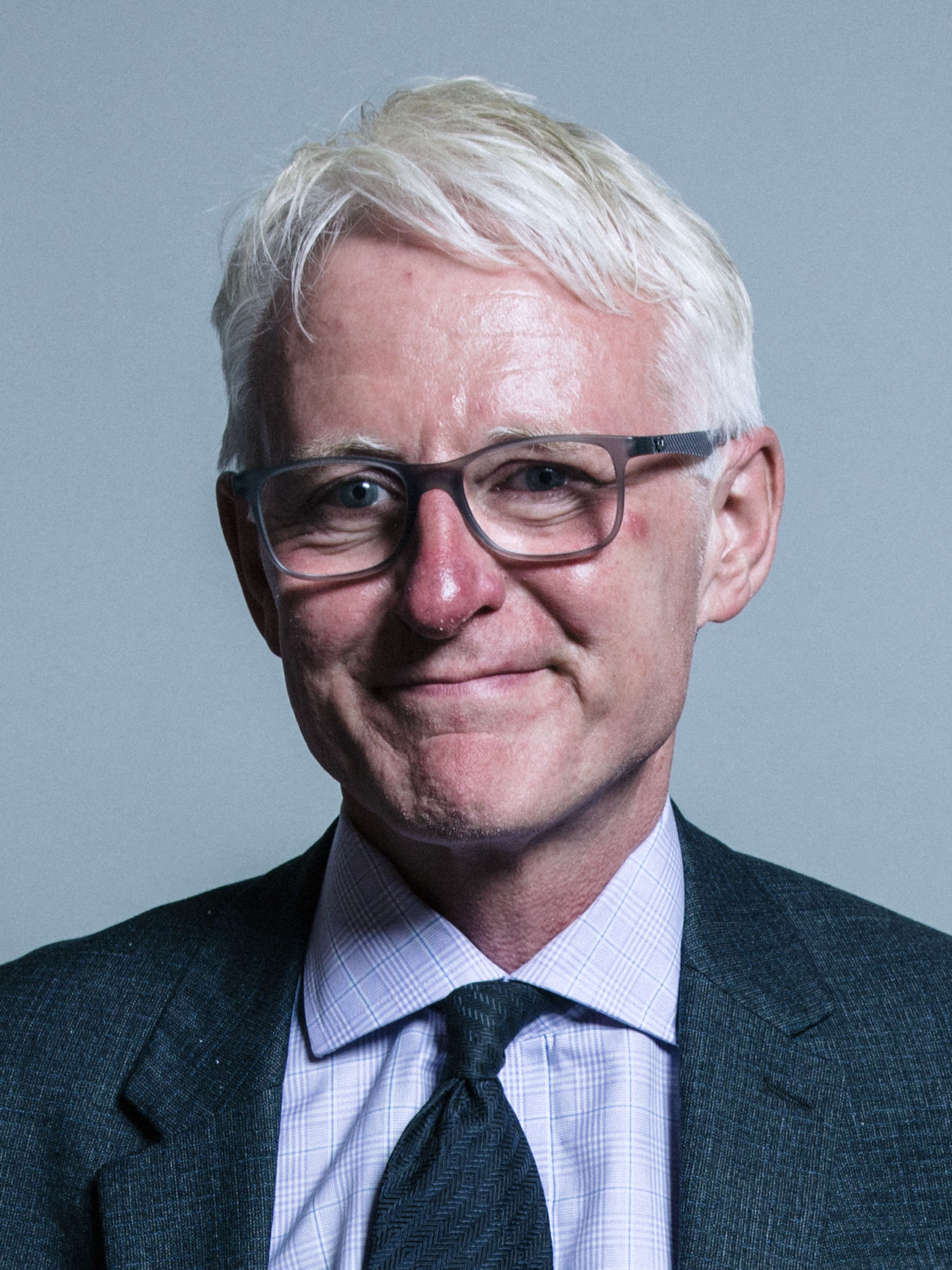
Candidate	Tim Farron	Norman Lamb
Popular vote	19,137	14,760
Percentage	56.5%	43.5%
Leader before election
Nick Clegg
Elected Leader
Tim Farron

The 2015 Liberal Democrats leadership election was held on 16 July 2015 following the resignation of Nick Clegg as leader on 8 May 2015, after almost eight years as leader of the Liberal Democrats, following the party's poor performance at the 2015 general election.

The result was announced on 16 July 2015 with Tim Farron winning by a margin of 13%.

== Background ==
In the 2015 general election, the Liberal Democrats lost 49 seats, reducing the party to eight seats in the House of Commons.

Many prominent party leaders and veteran MPs lost bids for re-election, including Chief Secretary to the Treasury Danny Alexander; Business Secretary and former interim leader Vince Cable; Energy and Climate Change Secretary Ed Davey; Charles Kennedy, who had been party leader from 1999 to 2006 and had been a member of Parliament for 32 years; and former deputy party leader Simon Hughes, who had also served in Parliament for 32 years. Individuals who had served as ministers Jo Swinson, Lynne Featherstone, Paul Burstow and Jenny Willott were also among the Lib Dem MPs who lost their seats.

Nick Clegg, the party's leader and Deputy Prime Minister in the Conservative-Lib Dem coalition government of 2010 to 2015, was re-elected in his Sheffield constituency, but resigned as party leader the morning after the election. In an emotional speech, he stated: "I must take responsibility and therefore I announce that I will be resigning as leader of the Liberal Democrats."

Under the rules of the Liberal Democrat parliamentary party, the Deputy Leader of the Liberal Democrats serves as an interim leader for the Liberal Democrats until a new leader can be elected. However, this position had been vacant since the election due to the retirement of Malcolm Bruce. The party president, Sal Brinton, a member of the House of Lords, was the de facto interim leader.

Following the election, the party experienced a surge in membership; 61,000 party members were entitled to vote, including over 16,500 new members who had joined before the close of nominations for the leadership.

== Election rules ==
The timetable for a leadership election was determined by the party's Federal Executive, under Article 10.4 of the Liberal Democrat constitution, and a meeting was held to discuss this on 9 May 2015.

Liberal Democrat leadership elections use the alternative vote (instant-runoff) system, the single-winner version of the single transferable vote. However, as only two candidates stood, it effectively became a simple plurality vote with all Liberal Democrat party members being entitled to vote under a "one member, one vote" system.

Article 10.5 of the Liberal Democrat constitution requires that any candidate wishing to stand must be a Member of Parliament and must have the support of:

- "at least ten percent of other members of the Parliamentary Party in the House of Commons" (i.e. one other MP at present); and
- "[be] supported by 200 members in aggregate in not less than 20 Local Parties"

The election itself was overseen by Electoral Reform Services, the commercial arm of the Electoral Reform Society.

== Timeline ==
7 May 2015	General election. Liberal Democrats return 8 MPs, down from 57 MPs in the 2010 election.
8 May 2015	Nick Clegg resigns as Liberal Democrat leader.
9 May 2015	Election timetable agreed by the Federal Executive.
13 May 2015	Nominations open.
3 June 2015	Nominations close.
24 June 2015	Ballot papers go out
15 July 2015	Voting closes.
16 July 2015	Result announced.

== Candidates ==
=== Declined ===
- Tom Brake, former Deputy Leader of the House of Commons and MP for Carshalton and Wallington
- Alistair Carmichael, Deputy Leader of the Scottish Liberal Democrats, former Secretary of State for Scotland and MP for Orkney and Shetland
- Greg Mulholland, MP for Leeds North West
- John Pugh, MP for Southport
- Mark Williams, MP for Ceredigion

=== Declared ===
Candidate	Born	Seat	Last positions	Campaign Coordinator	MPs' and MEPs' endorsements
Tim Farron	27 May 1970 (age 45)	MP for Westmorland and Lonsdale	President of the Liberal Democrats (2011–2015); Foreign Affairs spokesman (2015)	Greg Mulholland	5 / 9 • Greg Mulholland • John Pugh • Mark Williams • Catherine Bearder
Norman Lamb	16 September 1957 (age 57)	MP for North Norfolk	Minister of State for Care and Support (2012–2015); Minister of State for Employment Relations (2012); Health spokesman	Lynne Featherstone	2 / 9 • Tom Brake

=== Other endorsements ===
==== Tim Farron ====
- Peers: Lord Carlile, Lord Cotter, Lady Hussein-Ece, Lord Macdonald of River Glaven, Baroness Maddock (former President of the Liberal Democrats), Lord Palmer of Childs Hill, Lord Palumbo, Lord Paddick, Lord Steel (former Leader of the Liberal Party), Lord Strasburger, Lord Taylor of Goss Moor.
- MSPs: Jim Hume MSP, Willie Rennie MSP (Leader of the Scottish Liberal Democrats).
- Welsh AMs: Peter Black AM, William Powell AM, Kirsty Williams AM (Leader of the Welsh Liberal Democrats).
- London AMs: Stephen Knight AM.
- Former MPs: Sir Alan Beith (former Deputy Leader of the Liberal Democrats), Duncan Hames, Martin Horwood, David Howarth, Simon Hughes (former Deputy Leader of the Liberal Democrats), Paul Keetch, John Leech, Jo Swinson, Sarah Teather.
- Former MEPs: Fiona Hall.
- Others: The Guardian, The Independent, New Statesman.

==== Norman Lamb ====
- Peers: Lord Addington, Lord Ashdown of Norton-sub-Hamdon, Baroness Barker, Baroness Bonham-Carter, Baroness Doocey, Lady Falkner, Baroness Garden, Baroness Grender, Baroness Hamwee, Baroness Jolly, Baroness Kramer, Baroness Ludford, Baroness Northover, Baroness Parminter, Baroness Suttie, Lord Tyler, Baroness Walmsley, Baroness Williams of Crosby
- Former MPs: Norman Baker, Paul Burstow, Ming Campbell (former Leader of the Liberal Democrats), Ed Davey, Lynne Featherstone, Sandra Gidley, Julia Goldsworthy, David Heath, John Hemming, Julian Huppert, Michael Moore (former Secretary of State for Scotland), Tessa Munt, David Laws, Sir Bob Russell, Mike Thornton, Stephen Williams, Jenny Willott Simon Wright.
- Former MEPs: Andrew Duff.
- Welsh AMs: Eluned Parrott
- Others: Frank Bruno (former boxer), Dappy (musician), The Economist.

== Polling and surveys ==
Poll source	Date(s) administered	Sample size	Margin of error	Tim Farron	Norman Lamb	Others/Undecided
Liberal Democrat Newswire	23 June – 5 July 2015	629 Lib Dem members	± ?%	58%	42%	—
YouGov	12–24 May 2015	730 Lib Dem members	± ?%	42%	14%	37% Other 8%

Poll source	Date(s) administered	Sample size	Margin of error	Alistair Carmichael	Tim Farron	Norman Lamb	Others/Undecided
Survation/The Mail on Sunday	8–9 May 2015	70 Lib Dem voters (Note: Persons who voted Liberal Democrat in 2015 general election.)	± 8.0%	13.9%	17.8%	13.3%	55%
Survation/The Mail on Sunday	8–9 May 2015	1,027 British residents (Note: Residents over 18 in Great Britain)	± 2.1%	7.7%	16.4%	9.5%	66.3%

A survey by LibDemVoice.org of self-selecting 1065 members out of 1900+ registered on the forum (out of a total party membership of 57,773) showed Tim Farron on 71%, with 29% preferring Norman Lamb for leader. LibDemVoice do not claim that their survey is representative of the total party membership but they claim they "are the largest independent samples of the views of Lib Dem members across the country, and have in the past offered accurate guides to what party members think."

On the day the results were due, Farron was the bookmakers' favourite.

== Campaign ==
Farron was seen as the candidate of the left of the party, while Lamb was seen as representing the politics of the party's prior involvement in coalition government, although others have argued the candidates' policy differences were minor.

Farron's religious beliefs and voting record on abortion and gay rights came under scrutiny. Lamb suspended two members of his campaign team over a survey of party members that broke party rules that highlighted views the Lamb campaign consider "illiberal".

In comments during the campaign, Tim Farron made reference to rebranding the party, but emphasised that in his view this needed to be more substantial than a simple superficial change: "I think rebranding ourselves, repositioning ourselves is very important. We've got to be absolutely radical about that but 18 months of a constitutional wrangle as we Tipp-Ex out a couple of words and add in another one in the constitution strikes me as a bit of a waste of time."

During the campaign Tim Farron was asked what role former Chief Executive, Chris Rennard, would have under his leadership. He replied, "I have no intention of appointing him to any role in the party."

=== Questions and answers put to the candidates ===
- ALTER
- ALDES
- Daisy Cooper
- Green Liberal Democrats
- Liberal Reform
- Libdems for Seekers of Sanctuary
- Foreign Policy, via Libdem Voice
- Liberal Democrat Lawyers

== Result ==
Candidate	Votes	%	
Turnout: 56.0%
Tim Farron ✓	19,137		56.5
Norman Lamb	14,760		43.5
Total	33,897	56%	—N/a

== See also ==
- 2017 Liberal Democrats deputy leadership election
- 2015 Labour Party leadership election (UK)
