= 2019 Liberal Democrats leadership election =

British, internal, political party contest

- 28 June – 22 July 2019
- Turnout: 72.1% (▲16.1%) (Note: Compared to voter turnout in 2015, as party members did not vote in 2017.)
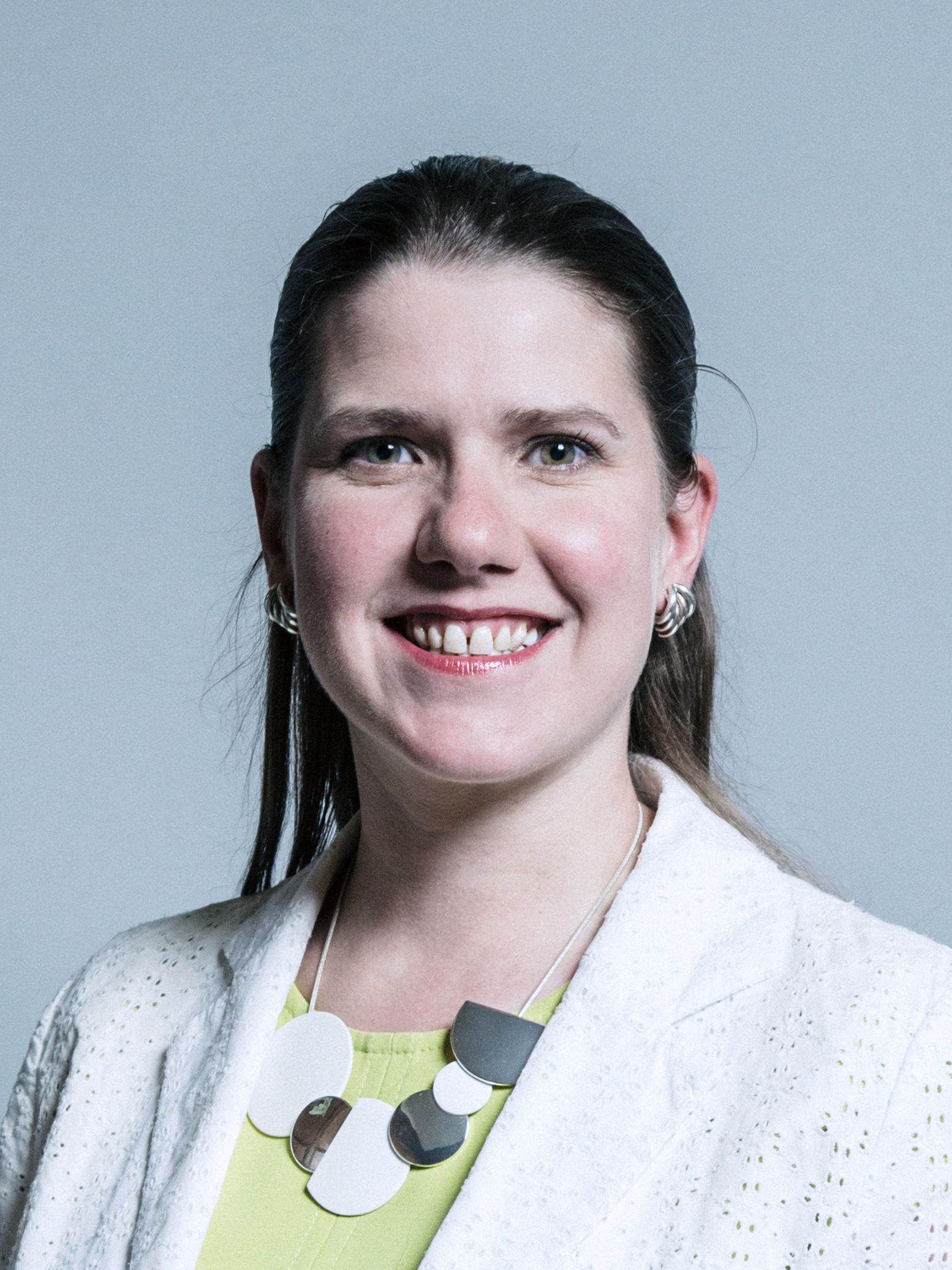

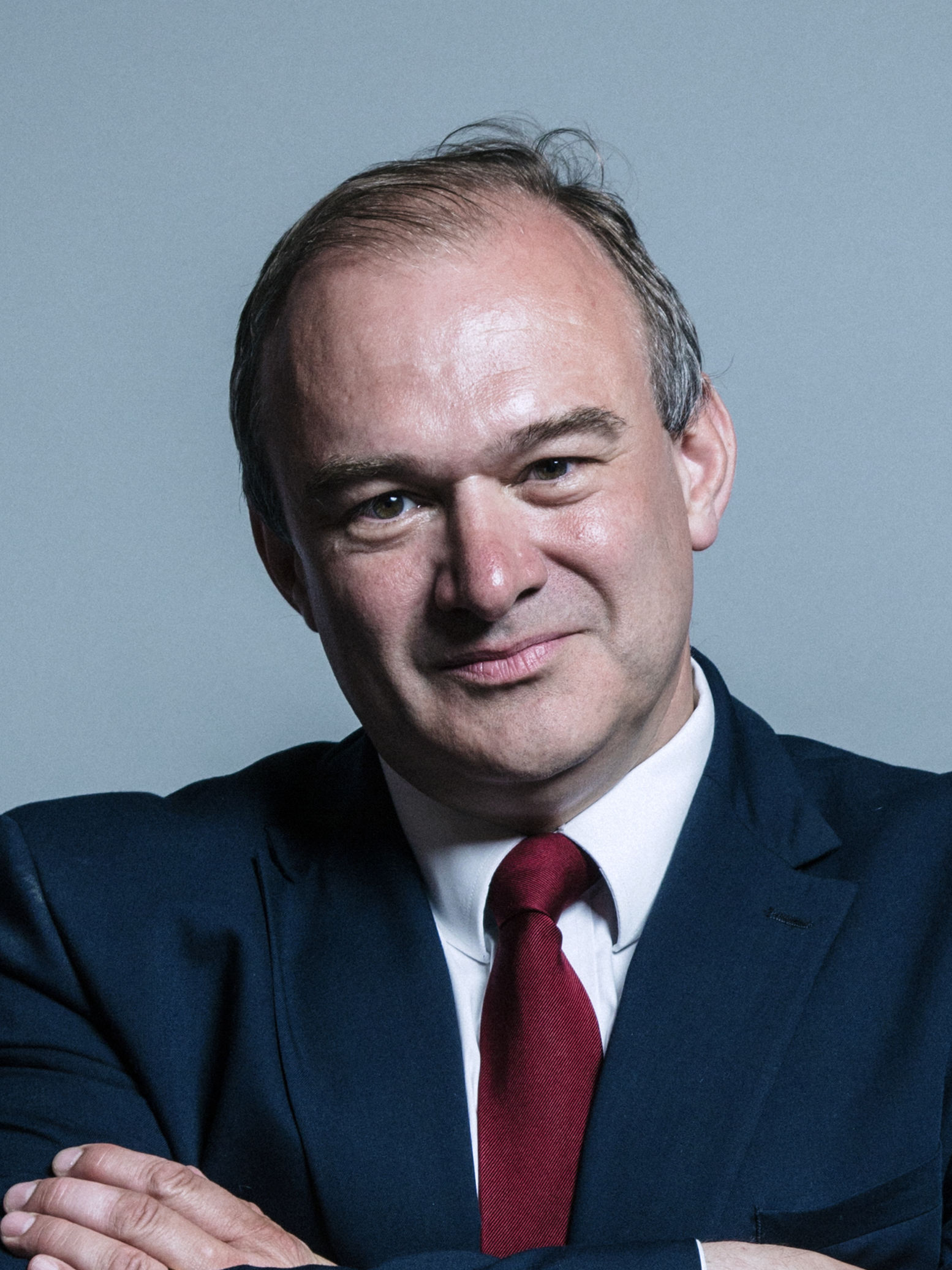
Candidate	Jo Swinson	Ed Davey
Popular vote	47,997	28,021
Percentage	62.8%	36.7%
Leader before election
Vince Cable
Elected Leader
Jo Swinson

The 2019 Liberal Democrats leadership election was held following the announcement of the resignation of Vince Cable as leader on 24 May 2019, after just under two years as leader of the Liberal Democrats in the United Kingdom. The two candidates to succeed Cable were Ed Davey and Jo Swinson.

The result was announced on 22 July 2019 with Swinson winning with over 62% of the vote.

== Background ==
Vince Cable had previously stated his intention to stand down before the next general election. Shortly before the party's 2019 Spring Conference, he announced that he would ask the party to hold the leadership election in May 2019, following the 2019 local elections. The party was expected to run a 9-week campaign starting after the European Parliament elections.

On 24 May, the day after the European elections (but before the results were counted on 26 May) and the same day that Prime Minister and leader of the Conservative Party Theresa May announced her upcoming resignation, the Liberal Democrat leadership election was formally started.

== Election rules ==
The running of the leadership election was determined by Article 17 of the Liberal Democrat constitution. Liberal Democrat leadership elections use the alternative vote (instant runoff) system, with all party members being entitled to vote under a one member, one vote system. As of 8 June the party membership was 105,480.

Nominations closed on 7 June and the new leader was scheduled to take over on 23 July. Nominees were required to be an MP, have the backing of at least 10% of the Parliamentary party (i.e. one other MP), and be supported by at least 200 members spread across at least 20 different local parties.

Cable had put a proposal to the party's Spring Conference to change the rules to allow non-MPs to seek the leadership; however, this was rejected. Thus the pool of potential candidates were the 11 MPs in the party at the time of the close of nominations. A proposal to allow registered supporters, as well as members, to vote in the leadership contest was also rejected.

Party members registered before the close of nominations were able to vote via postal or electronic ballots; these were issued on 28 June and 1 July respectively. Voting closed on 22 July and the winner announced that evening.

== Campaign ==
In February 2019, eleven MPs from the Labour Party and Conservative Party resigned to form the centrist Independent Group, soon to be renamed as Change UK. Among potential leadership candidates, Jo Swinson was seen as most open to working with the Independent Group, while Ed Davey was least open.

Layla Moran, having been elected to parliament in 2017, was seen as the candidate least related to the Cameron–Clegg coalition government. Initially, most focus was on Swinson, Moran and Davey as likely contenders. However, in mid-May Moran announced that she would not be entering the contest. Following the May 2019 European Parliament elections, in which the Liberal Democrats performed extremely well, coming second and beating both the Conservative and Labour parties, Swinson and Davey were expected to be the candidates, with Swinson favoured by bookmakers. Swinson called on supporters of Change UK and the Greens to work with the Liberal Democrats, but stopped short of calling for a formal alliance between the parties. Stephen Bush, writing for the New Statesman, argued that the expected campaign issues—the legacy of the coalition and the threat of Change UK—were both largely rendered moot by the success of the Liberal Democrats in the local and European elections.

Davey launched his campaign on 30 May with a focus on revoking the UK's withdrawal from the European Union and on environmental issues by "de-carbonising capitalism". He hinted at more interest in encouraging defections to the Liberal Democrats than pacts with other parties, like Change UK. He also defended the record of the coalition. Swinson announced her campaign later that day too. Later that week, she said the party could be open to local electoral agreements to support other pro-Remain politicians, but that the Liberal Democrats were the "obvious rallying point" for those opposed to Brexit.

Liberal Democrat Chief Whip Alistair Carmichael announced that the MPs, while they may make individual endorsements like Christine Jardine, will stay largely neutral in the election and two MPs will nominate each candidate in order to show that MPs will work with whoever becomes leader. Christine Jardine and Tom Brake nominated Swinson, and Wera Hobhouse and Jamie Stone nominated Davey. Carmichael and Cable remained neutral in the campaign.

== Candidates ==
Roles in bold are currently held.

Candidate	Last political roles	Announced	Nominated by
**Ed Davey**	**MP for Kingston and Surbiton** (1997–2015, since 2017); **Home Affairs Spokesperson** (since 2017); Energy Secretary (2012–2015); Foreign Affairs Spokesperson (2007–2010)	30 May 2019	Wera Hobhouse and Jamie Stone
**Jo Swinson**	**MP for East Dunbartonshire** (2005–2015, 2017–2019); Deputy Leader (2017–2019); Foreign Affairs Spokesperson (2017–2019)	30 May 2019	Christine Jardine and Tom Brake

=== Declined ===
The following MPs were discussed in the media as potential leadership candidates, but they declined to stand:

- Tom Brake, MP for Carshalton and Wallington (1997–2019); Party Spokesperson for Exiting the European Union (2017–present) and for the Office of First Secretary of State (2017–present) (endorsed Swinson)
- Alistair Carmichael, MP for Orkney and Shetland (2001–present); Party Spokesperson for Environment, Food and Rural Affairs (2019–present), Chief Whip in the House of Commons (2017–present) and Deputy Leader of the Scottish Liberal Democrats (2012–present)
- Christine Jardine, MP for Edinburgh West (2017–present) and Party Spokesperson for Work and Pensions (2019–present) (endorsed Swinson)
- Norman Lamb, MP for North Norfolk (2001–2019); Chair of the Science and Technology Select Committee (2017–present) and former Health Minister
- Layla Moran, MP for Oxford West and Abingdon (2017–present) and Party Spokesperson for Education (2017–present)

== Endorsements ==
=== Ed Davey ===
Endorsements for Ed Davey

Members of the European Parliament

- Caroline Voaden, MEP for South West England since 2019
- Shaffaq Mohammed, MEP for Yorkshire and the Humber since 2019
- Irina von Wiese, MEP for London since 2019
- Chris Davies, MEP for North West England (1995–2014; since 2019) and MP for Littleborough and Saddleworth (1995–1997)

Members of the Scottish Parliament

- Liam McArthur, MSP for Orkney since 2007

Former Members of Parliament

- Sarah Olney, MP for Richmond Park (2016–2017)
- Matthew Green, MP for Ludlow (2001–2005)
- Liz Lynne, MP for Rochdale (1992–1997) and MEP for West Midlands (1999–2012)
- Mark Williams, Leader of the Welsh Liberal Democrats (2016–2017) and MP for Ceredigion (2005–2017)

Peers

- Liz Barker, life peer since 1999
- Floella Benjamin, life peer since 2010
- David Chidgey, life peer since 2005 and MP for Eastleigh (1994–2005)
- Navnit Dholakia, life peer since 1997 and President of the Liberal Democrats (2001–2004)
- Don Foster, life peer since 2015 and MP for Bath (1992–2015)
- Angie Harris, life peer since 1999 and Deputy Speaker of the House of Lords since 2010
- Meral Hussein-Ece, life peer since 2010
- Judith Jolly, life peer since 2010 and Party Spokesperson for Health since 2017
- Sarah Ludford, life peer since 1997 and MEP for London (1999–2014)
- Jonny Oates, life peer since 2015
- Chris Rennard, life peer since 1999 and Chief Executive of the Liberal Democrats (2003–2009)
- Roger Roberts, life peer since 2004
- Paul Scriven, life peer since 2014
- Mike Storey, life peer since 2011
- Celia Thomas, life peer since 2006
- William Wallace, life peer since 1995

=== Jo Swinson ===
Endorsements for Jo Swinson

Members of Parliament

- Tom Brake, MP for Carshalton and Wallington since 1997 and Party Spokesperson for Exiting the European Union and International Trade since 2017
- Wera Hobhouse, MP for Bath since 2017 and Party Spokesperson for Energy and Climate Change since 2019
- Christine Jardine, MP for Edinburgh West since 2017 and Party Spokesperson for Work and Pensions since 2019

Members of the European Parliament

- Jane Brophy, MEP for North West England since 2019
- Antony Hook, MEP for South East England since 2019
- Martin Horwood, MEP for South West England since 2019 and MP for Cheltenham (2005–2015)
- Barbara Gibson, MEP for East of England since 2019
- Sheila Ritchie, MEP for Scotland since 2019

Members of the Scottish Parliament

- Alex Cole-Hamilton, MSP for Edinburgh Western since 2016
- Willie Rennie, Leader of the Scottish Liberal Democrats since 2011, MEP for Dunfermline and West Fife (2006–2010), Mid Scotland and Fife (2011–2016) and North East Fife since 2016

Former Members of Parliament

- Julian Huppert, MP for Cambridge (2010–2015)
- John Leech, MP for Manchester Withington (2005–2015)
- Tessa Munt, MP for Wells (2010–2015)

Peers

- Olly Grender, life peer since 2013

Former peers

- Shirley Williams, life peer (1993–2016), Leader of the Liberal Democrats in the House of Lords (2001–2004), President of the Social Democratic Party (1982–1987), Secretary of State for Education (1976–1979), MP for Hitchin(1964–1974), Hertford and Stevenage (1974–1979) and Crosby (1981–1983)

Directly elected mayors

- Peter Taylor, Mayor of Watford since 2018
- Dave Hodgson, Mayor of Bedford since 2009

Individuals

- Pauline Pearce, anti-knife crime activist

Publications

- The Independent

== Public hustings ==
Ed Davey and Jo Swinson were invited to take place in a series of hustings organised by the party. Each of the fourteen events was held in a different location across Britain.

Date	Region	Venue	Map
31 May 2019	London	City of London Academy, London	2019 Liberal Democrats leadership election is located in the United Kingdom
1 June 2019	South East England	United Church, Winchester	2019 Liberal Democrats leadership election is located in the United Kingdom
1 June 2019	Western Counties	King Edward's School, Bath	2019 Liberal Democrats leadership election is located in the United Kingdom
7 June 2019	Scotland	MacRobert Building, Aberdeen	2019 Liberal Democrats leadership election is located in the United Kingdom
8 June 2019	Scotland	Stockbridge Parish Church, Edinburgh	2019 Liberal Democrats leadership election is located in the United Kingdom
8 June 2019	North East	The Assembly Rooms, Newcastle upon Tyne	2019 Liberal Democrats leadership election is located in the United Kingdom
14 June 2019	North West	St Thomas Centre, Manchester	2019 Liberal Democrats leadership election is located in the United Kingdom
15 June 2019	Yorkshire and the Humber	DoubleTree by Hilton Hotel, Leeds	2019 Liberal Democrats leadership election is located in the United Kingdom
15 June 2019	East Midlands	Jubilee Campus, Nottingham	2019 Liberal Democrats leadership election is located in the United Kingdom
17 June 2019	Online hustings		2019 Liberal Democrats leadership election is located in the United Kingdom
21 June 2019	Devon & Cornwall	Duke of Cornwall Hotel, Plymouth	2019 Liberal Democrats leadership election is located in the United Kingdom
22 June 2019	Wales	Metropole Hotel, Llandrindod Wells	2019 Liberal Democrats leadership election is located in the United Kingdom
27 June 2019	South East England	Sofitel London Gatwick, Crawley	2019 Liberal Democrats leadership election is located in the United Kingdom
28 June 2019	East of England	Sidgwick Site, Cambridge	2019 Liberal Democrats leadership election is located in the United Kingdom
29 June 2019	West Midlands	Stratford-upon-Avon School, Stratford-upon-Avon	2019 Liberal Democrats leadership election is located in the United Kingdom
10 July 2019	London	National Liberal Club, London	2019 Liberal Democrats leadership election is located in the United Kingdom

== Opinion polling ==
Date(s) conducted	Polling organisation/client	Sample size	Jo Swinson	Ed Davey	Undecided
June/July	Lib Dem Newswire	2,863; Lib Dem members	40%	20%	40%
June/July	Lib Dem Newswire	2,863; Lib Dem members	60%	40%	—

== Result ==
Candidate	Votes	%	
✓ Jo Swinson	47,997		62.8
Ed Davey	28,021		36.7
Spoilt ballots	411		0.5
Total	76,429	Turnout	72.1

The electorate numbered 106,075, meaning that 76,429 Liberal Democrat members cast a vote, and 29,646 did not.

== See also ==
- 2019 Conservative Party leadership election
- 2019 UK Independence Party leadership election
- 2019 Liberal Democrats deputy leadership election
