= 2017 Liberal Democrats leadership election =

British internal political party contest

- 14 June – 20 July 2017
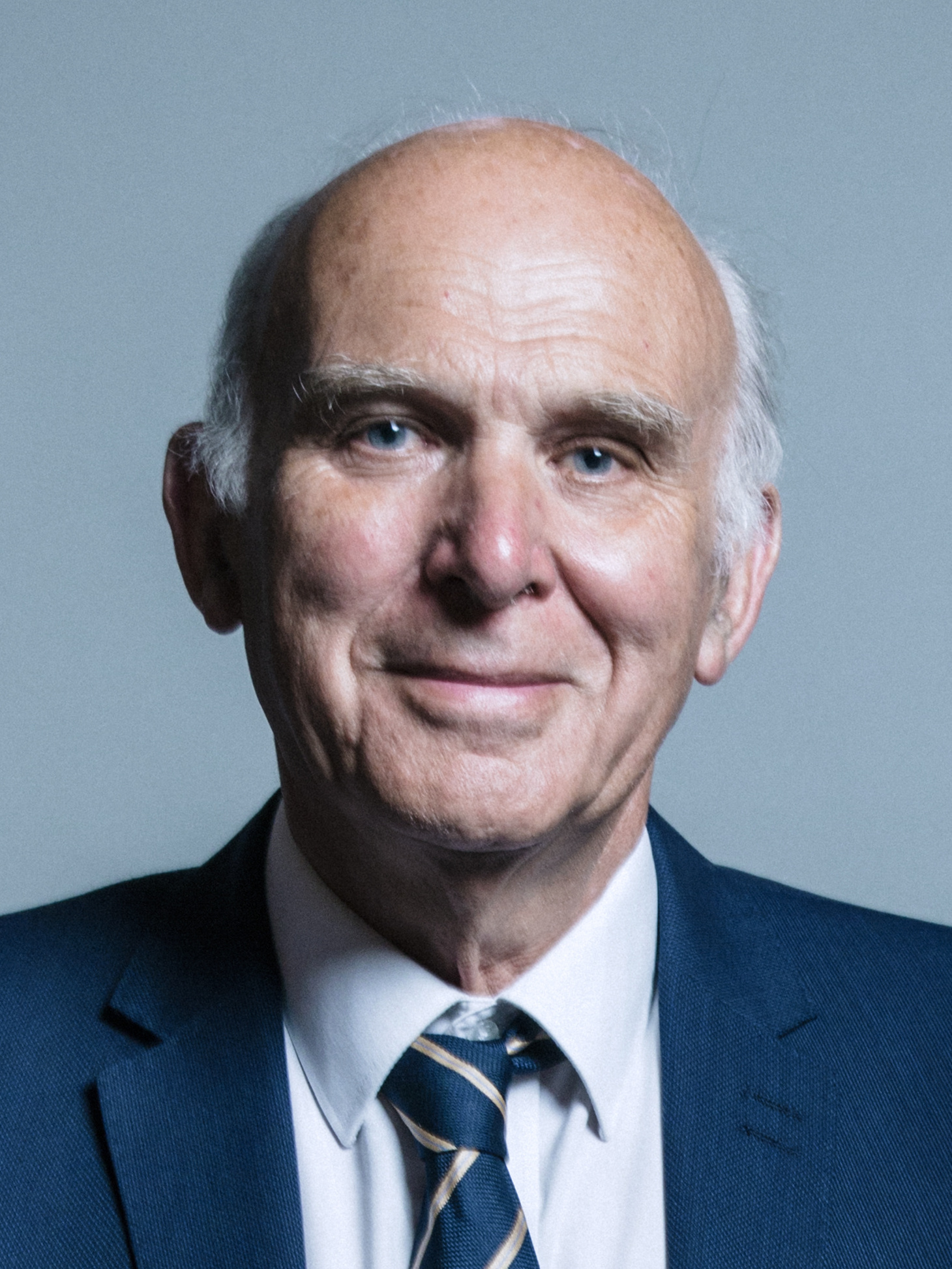
| Candidate | Vince Cable |
| Popular vote | Unopposed |
Leader before election
Tim Farron
Elected Leader
Vince Cable

The 2017 Liberal Democrats leadership election was held following the resignation of Tim Farron as leader on 14 June 2017, after just under two years as leader of the Liberal Democrats. At the close of applications on 20 July 2017, Vince Cable was the only nominated candidate and was therefore declared the new leader of the party.

== Background ==
In the 2017 general election, the Liberal Democrats gained four seats compared to the previous election despite a falling share of the vote, maintaining the party as the fourth largest in the House of Commons. Some prominent Liberal Democrat MPs who lost their seats in the 2015 election regained their seats, including Cable, Ed Davey and Jo Swinson. Former party leader Nick Clegg lost his seat.

Tim Farron, the party's leader, was re-elected in his Westmorland and Lonsdale constituency with a significantly reduced majority. He announced he would step down as party leader on 14 June 2017, a week after the election, citing difficulty in reconciling his faith and his leadership. He remained as party leader until the 20 July, when he was succeeded by Vince Cable following an uncontested leadership election.

== Election rules ==
The timetable for the leadership election was determined by the party's Federal Executive, under Article 17.4 of the Liberal Democrat constitution.

Liberal Democrat leadership elections use the alternative vote (instant runoff) system, with all Liberal Democrat party members being entitled to vote under a "one member, one vote" system.

Candidates had to be current Liberal Democrat MPs. Article 18.5 of the Liberal Democrat constitution requires that any candidate wishing to stand must be a Member of Parliament and must have the support of:

- "at least ten percent of other members of the Parliamentary Party in the House of Commons" (i.e. two other MPs at present); and
- "[be] supported by 200 members in aggregate in not less than 20 Local Parties"

=== Timetable ===
The election timetable was as follows:

| 25 June | Opening of nominations |
| 20 July | Closing of nominations (4pm) |
| 16 August | Dispatch of ballot papers |
| 11 September | Deadline for ballot papers to be returned (5pm post or hand, midnight electronic) |
| 13 September | Verification, count and declaration of the winner |

== Campaign ==
Despite being the bookmakers' favourite, Jo Swinson announced on 18 June that she would not stand for the leadership. She explained that she had decided to contest the deputy leadership before hearing of Farron's resignation and that she had decided that the deputy leadership was the right role for her at the time. On 20 June, Swinson was elected unopposed as deputy leader. This left Ed Davey, Norman Lamb and Vince Cable as the most likely contenders. Cable declared his candidacy on 20 June.

There was some speculation that Swinson had chosen to support Cable to lead for two or three years before taking over the leadership herself, given his age compared to other potential leadership candidates. The Daily Telegraph claimed that Swinson and Cable had agreed a deal to this effect. While both Swinson and Cable denied this, Cable did tell the Telegraph that "it is a simple fact of life if I decided in three years' time to let someone else take over she is ideally placed to do it".

Lamb had stood in the last leadership election, and has been praised for his work on mental health. He was expected to be more centrist and less stridently oppositional to Brexit, and his abstention on the vote for the Article 50 notification triggering Brexit was seen as a potential weakness within the strongly pro-EU party. He declined to stand, and explained his decision in an article in The Guardian, calling for the party to better engage with those who voted for Brexit.

Davey originally planned to support Swinson. He has been associated with The Orange Book wing of the party. On 27 June, Davey announced he would not be standing for the leadership, citing "the need to be there for my young children and not continually away from home".

Following Davey's announcement, The Guardian observed: "Nominations do not close until next month, but Cable is the only candidate to have declared and there is no other Lib Dem MP seen as having the potential to beat him in a contest". By 3 July 2017, ten of the eleven other Liberal Democrat MPs had declared they would not be standing; this left Christine Jardine, who was only elected to Parliament in June 2017, as the only remaining potential challenger who had not declared their intent. By 14 July, Vince Cable claimed that every other MP had pledged to support him.

== Candidates ==
=== Declared ===
- Vince Cable, MP for Twickenham (1997–2015 and 2017–present); Deputy Leader of the Liberal Democrats (2006–2010) and Acting Leader (October–December 2007); Business Secretary (2010–2015); Liberal Democrat Spokesperson for the Treasury (2003–2010, since 2017)
Cable's endorsements

MPs

- Tom Brake
- Stephen Lloyd
- Jamie Stone

=== Declined ===
- Tom Brake, MP for Carshalton and Wallington; Liberal Democrat Shadow First Secretary of State, Spokesperson for Exiting the European Union and for International Trade
- Alistair Carmichael, MP for Orkney and Shetland; Liberal Democrat Chief Whip
- Ed Davey, MP for Kingston and Surbiton; Liberal Democrat Spokesperson for Home Affairs
- Wera Hobhouse, MP for Bath; Liberal Democrat Spokesperson for Communities and Local Government and for Refugees
- Norman Lamb, MP for North Norfolk; candidate for Leader in 2015; Liberal Democrat Spokesperson for Health
- Stephen Lloyd, MP for Eastbourne; Liberal Democrat Spokesperson for Work and Pensions
- Layla Moran, MP for Oxford West and Abingdon; Liberal Democrat Spokesperson for Education and for Young People
- Jamie Stone, MP for Caithness, Sutherland and Easter Ross; Liberal Democrat Spokesperson for Scotland
- Jo Swinson, MP for East Dunbartonshire; Liberal Democrat Spokesperson for Foreign and Commonwealth Affairs (elected unopposed as Deputy Leader)

== Opinion polling ==
=== Before close of nominations ===
The following survey was conducted before the close of nominations and therefore includes candidates who did not put themselves forward.

| Date(s) conducted | Polling organisation/client | Sample size | Jo Swinson | Norman Lamb | Vince Cable | Ed Davey | Layla Moran | All others |
|---|---|---|---|---|---|---|---|---|
| June | Lib Dem Newswire | 2,209; Lib Dem members | 57% | — | — | — | — | 43% (Note: No other candidate achieved 15% of first preferences.) |
| June | Lib Dem Newswire | 2,209; Lib Dem members | — | 30% | 29% | 18% | 8% | 15% |
| June | Lib Dem Newswire | 2,209; Lib Dem members | — | 52% | 48% | — | — | — |
| June | Lib Dem Newswire | 2,209; Lib Dem members | — | — | 57% | 43% | — | — |

== Result ==
At 16:00 on 20 July 2017, Vince Cable was the only nominated candidate and was declared leader of the Liberal Democrats.

== See also ==
- 2017 Liberal Democrats deputy leadership election
- 2017 UK Independence Party leadership election
