= 2019 Liberal Democrats deputy leadership election =

- 3 September 2019
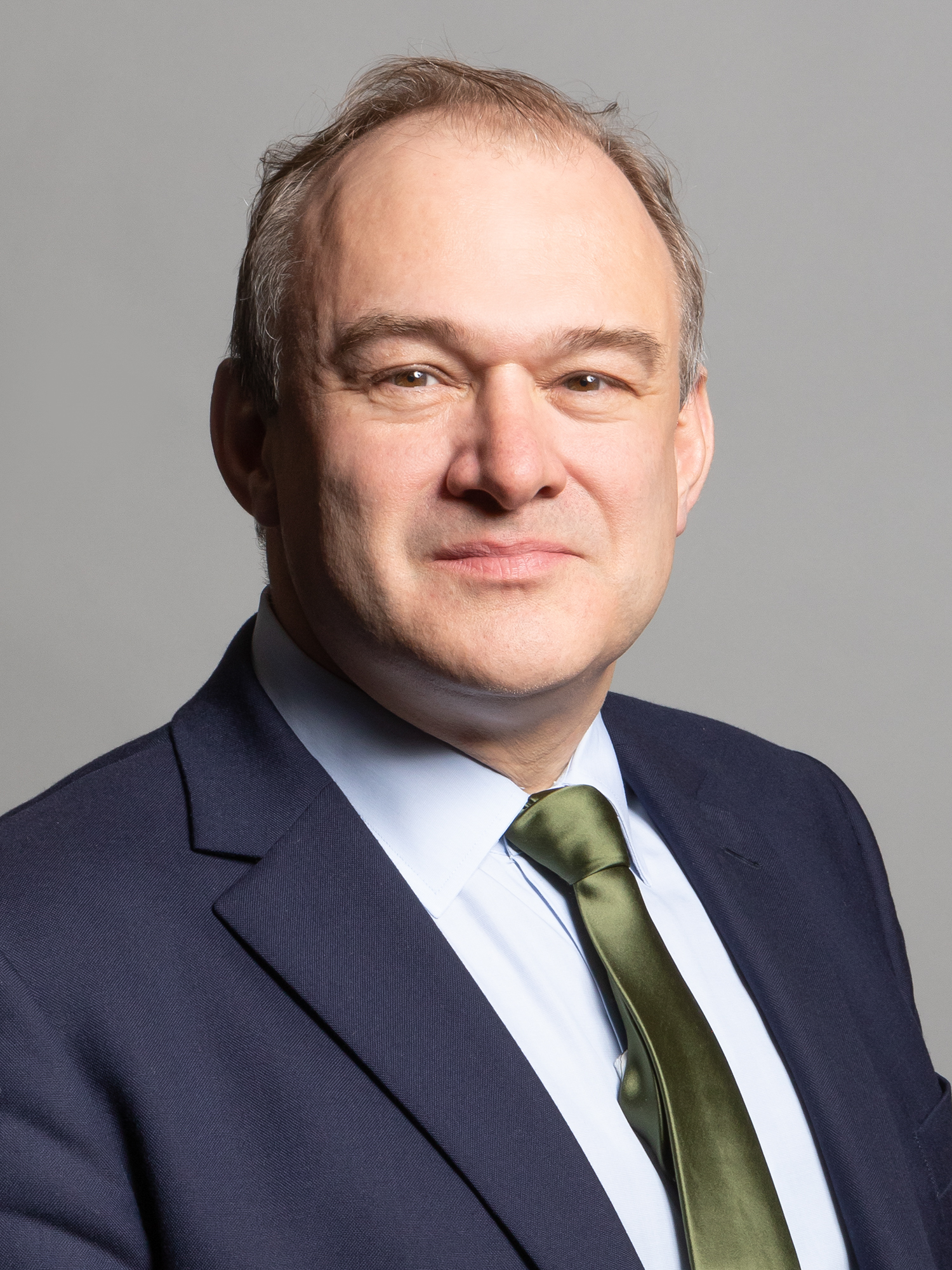
Candidate	Ed Davey
Popular vote	Unopposed
Deputy Leader before election
Jo Swinson
(vacant since 22 July 2019)
Elected Deputy Leader
Ed Davey

The 2019 Liberal Democrats deputy leadership election was held in September 2019. It followed the election of the incumbent deputy leader Jo Swinson as party leader in July 2019.

== Election rules ==
Unlike the party leader, there is no official position of deputy leader within the party's constitution. A deputy leader of the Liberal Democrats group in the House of Commons can be elected by a ballot of sitting Liberal Democrat MPs.

== Results ==
The result was announced on 3 September 2019 with Ed Davey elected as deputy leader.
