= Liberal Democrat Voice =

Political blog

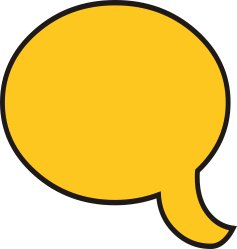
- Website type: Blog
- Available in: English
- Founded: 8 September 2006
- Founder: Rob Fenwick
- Editor: Caron Lindsay
- Website: http://www.libdemvoice.org/
- Registration: Optional for forums
- Launched: 8 September 2006
- Current status: Active

Liberal Democrat Voice (also known as Lib Dem Voice) is a political blog. The site claims to be read by over 50,000 individual visitors per month specialising in British Liberal politics.

Robin Fenwick created the site on Friday 8 September 2006. Since July 2007, it has been run by a collective of Liberal Democrat members, activists and bloggers.

The site aims to present views from a range of people and perspectives on the Liberal Democrats.

The site conducts regular surveys of Liberal Democrat members, which serve as a respectable bellwether of party opinion: mainstream UK press such as The Independent cite these, most notably over the issue of Vince Cable being the preferred candidate to succeed Nick Clegg as party leader. For example, in a 2011 survey, Vince Cable was also voted Lib Dem minister of the year.

The site is rated as the top Liberal Democrat blog by Total Politics for 2011 and has been consistently rated by Wikio as the 5th most influential political blog in the UK.

== Features ==
Contributors to Liberal Democrat Voice include Senior Liberal Democrats such as Charles Kennedy, John Pugh, Danny Alexander, Tim Farron, Sal Brinton, Caroline Pidgeon, Ed Davey, Brian Paddick, Jenny Willott and Mark Pack as well as new and long serving members of the party.

The site also features regular polls of Lib Dem members showing where they agree and where they disagree with party policy.

As well as being a blog which is open to any contributor the site also contains a Liberal Democrat party members-only forum which members use as a place for debate and discussion.

== Editor ==
Lib Dem Voice's current editor is Lib Dem commentator Caron Lindsay. She is supported by a team of day editors (Mark Valladares, Alan Muhammed, and Mary Reid), contributing editors (Joe Otten, Alex Foster, Sara Bedford and Nick Thornsby), and a technical editor, Ryan Cullen.

Former editors include Stephen Tall, Lib Dem Party President Mark Pack and founder Rob Fenwick.
