= Jenny Willott =

British Liberal Democrat politician

The Right Honourable Jenny Willott OBE
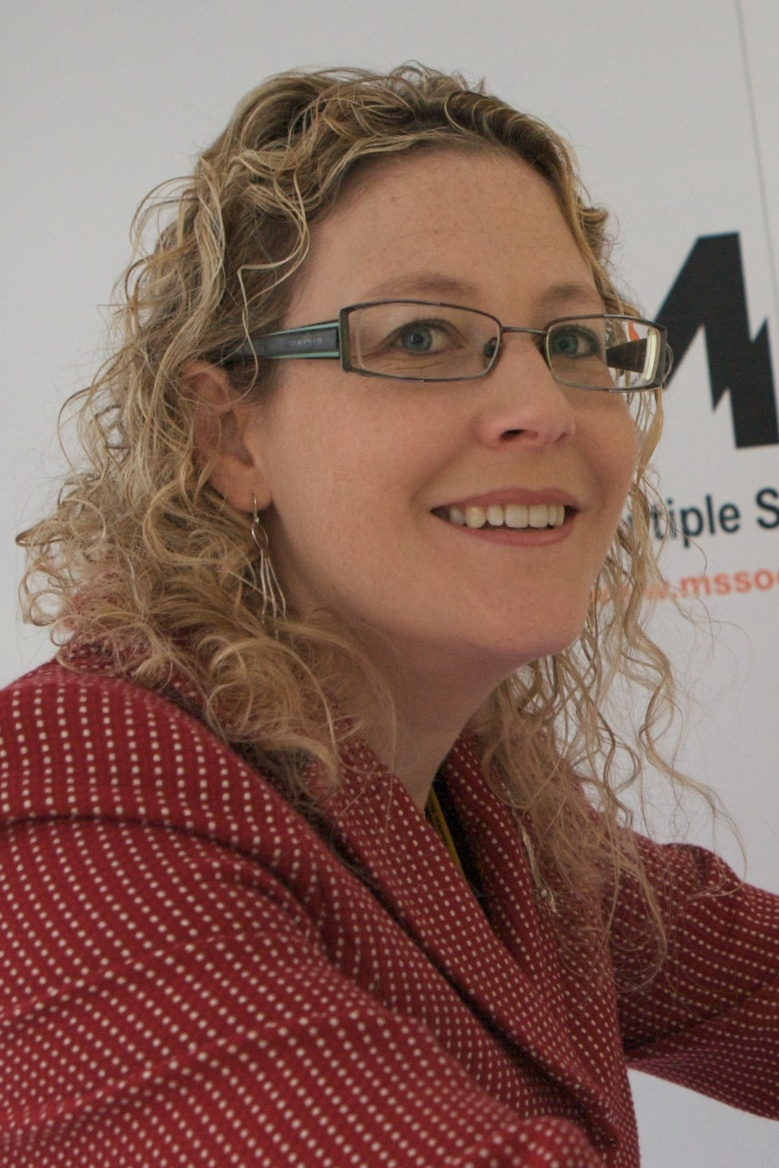

Parliamentary Under-Secretary of State for Employment Relations, Consumer and Postal Affairs
- In office 18 December 2013 – 30 June 2014
- Prime Minister: David Cameron
- Preceded by: Jo Swinson
- Succeeded by: Jo Swinson

Parliamentary Private Secretary to the Secretary of State for Energy and Climate Change
- In office 12 May 2010 – 9 December 2010
- Prime Minister: David Cameron
- Succeeded by: Duncan Hames

Member of Parliament for Cardiff Central
- In office 5 May 2005 – 30 March 2015
- Preceded by: Jon Owen Jones
- Succeeded by: Jo Stevens

Personal details
- Born: 29 May 1974 (age 52) Wimbledon, London, England
- Party: Welsh Liberal Democrats
- Spouse: Andrew Poole
- Children: 2 sons
- Education: Durham University; London School of Economics
- Website: www.jennywillott.com

Jennifer Nancy Willott OBE (born 29 May 1974) is a British politician. She was the Liberal Democrat Member of Parliament for Cardiff Central from 2005 to 2015. Willott became a junior minister in the Department for Business, Innovation and Skills and Government Equalities Office in December 2013, temporarily standing in for Jo Swinson while Swinson was on maternity leave. She was the first woman and first Liberal Democrat to represent her seat. Willott was a councillor in the London Borough of Merton from 1998 to 2000.

== Education ==
Willott was born in Wimbledon, London. She was educated at Uppingham School, studied Classics at St Mary's College, Durham University, and attended the London School of Economics, obtaining an MSc in Development Studies.

== Political career ==
After university, Willott was chief researcher for Lembit Opik, Liberal Democrat MP for Montgomeryshire.

Willott's 2005 campaign was closely linked to specific local and national issues and her support was widespread across all wards.

In her maiden speech, Willott pledged to "make Cardiff proud" and celebrated the cultural diversity of her constituency. She declared her priorities in parliament would be local health services, tuition and top-up fees, and council tax. She supported Sir Menzies Campbell in the leadership election in 2006, and was later appointed Shadow Minister for Youth Affairs, Whip, and Deputy Chief Whip.

In 2008 she was appointed as Shadow Minister for Justice and later Shadow Secretary of State for Work and Pensions. In January 2009 she was appointed Shadow Chancellor of the Duchy of Lancaster.

In December 2010 she resigned her post as parliamentary aide to Chris Huhne shortly before a vote to increase tuition fees as recommended by the Browne Review, to keep her pledge to constituents that she would vote against any increase in fees.

In a mini-reshuffle of the Coalition Government on 3 February 2012 caused by Huhne's prosecution and subsequent resignation, Willott was appointed an Assistant Whip.

In May 2014 Willott complained about the hostile atmosphere of Prime Minister's Questions and the low number of female ministers. She called for all-female shortlists for MPs, something which was not Liberal Democrat party policy. In 2014, she left the Government but was appointed to the Privy Council by David Cameron. In 2015, she lost her seat in the House of Commons to the Labour Party's Jo Stevens.

=== Controversy ===
Willott was subject to criticism from rival political parties and the media in the wake of the expenses scandal, as it emerged she claimed more in expenses and administration costs than any other Welsh MP. Her expenses and office costs were £57,000 in a year, including claims for a new flat and costs of moving offices in central Cardiff.

Willott also came under some pressure from political opponents over her support for the bedroom tax. A protest outside her Cardiff office about the issue led to her not going in to her office on that day.

== After Parliament ==
She is currently Chief Executive Officer for Re-engage - the charity for reducing loneliness in later life.

Willott worked as The Director of Enterprise and Innovation at St Mary’s University, Twickenham. She is also a member of IPSAs board.

She was appointed an Officer of the Order of the British Empire (OBE) in the 2018 Birthday Honours, for political and public service.

== Personal life ==
Willott is married to Andrew Poole and they have two children; the birth of her second child in February 2013 notably necessitated her absence from a vote on the Marriage (Same-Sex Couples) Bill.

Parliament of the United Kingdom
Preceded by Jon Owen Jones	Member of Parliament for Cardiff Central; 2005–2015	Succeeded by Jo Stevens
