= Duncan Hames =

British Former Liberal Democrat politician

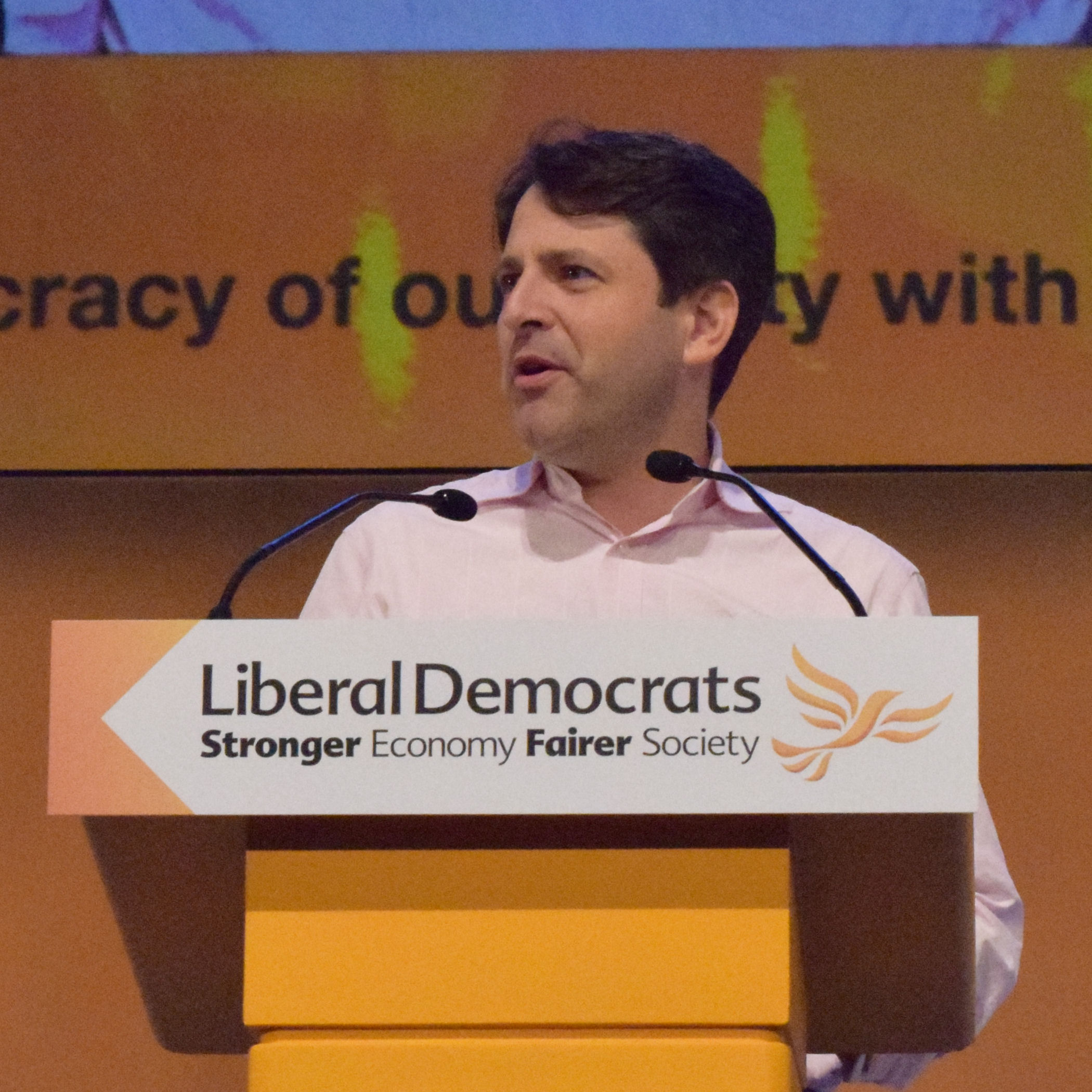
- Hames in 2014

Parliamentary Private Secretary to the Deputy Prime Minister
- In office 5 September 2012 – 30 March 2015
- Prime Minister: David Cameron
- Deputy PM: Nick Clegg
- Preceded by: Jo Swinson
- Succeeded by: Vacant

Parliamentary Private Secretary to the Secretary of State for Energy and Climate Change
- In office 16 August 2011 – 5 September 2012
- Prime Minister: David Cameron
- Sec. of State: Chris Huhne; Sir Ed Davey
- Preceded by: Jenny Willott
- Succeeded by: Steve Gilbert

Member of Parliament for Chippenham
- In office 6 May 2010 – 30 March 2015
- Preceded by: Constituency created
- Succeeded by: Michelle Donelan

Personal details
- Born: Duncan John Hames; 16 June 1977 (age 49) Hertfordshire, England
- Party: Liberal Democrats
- Spouse: Jo Swinson (m. 2011)
- Children: 3
- Education: New College, Oxford (BA)
- Website: www.duncanhames.org.uk

Duncan John Hames (born 16 June 1977) is a Director of Policy at Transparency International UK and a former Liberal Democrat politician. He was the Member of Parliament (MP) for the Chippenham constituency in Wiltshire from 2010 to 2015. Between 2012 and 2015, he served as Parliamentary Private Secretary to Nick Clegg when he was Deputy Prime Minister.

== Early life ==
Hames was born in Hertfordshire and attended Watford Grammar School for Boys. He studied PPE at New College, Oxford, where he was an executive officer of the Oxford University Student Union and represented the Oxford Union in debating competitions.

== Career ==
After graduation, Hames trained as an accountant with Deloitte. In June 2000, he stood for the Liberal Democrats in the Tottenham by-election, but was unsuccessful, it being a safe seat for the Labour Party. He was then the Liberal Democrat candidate in his home constituency of Watford at the 2001 general election. He moved to Holt in Wiltshire, and from 2003 to 2007 served as a member of West Wiltshire District Council. In 2003 Hames joined the board of the South West of England Regional Development Agency and was the Lib Dem candidate for the Westbury constituency at the 2005 general election.

In July 2006, shortly after the creation of a new Chippenham county constituency, Hames was selected as his party's first candidate for it, and his success at the 2010 general election gave Wiltshire its first Liberal member of parliament in 86 years.

Following his defeat at the 2015 general election, Hames chose not to stand for re-selection as the Liberal Democrat candidate in the Chippenham constituency.

He is Head of Policy at the UK chapter of Transparency International.

== Personal life ==
On 13 May 2011, Hames married fellow Liberal Democrat MP Jo Swinson, who was first elected as the Lib Dem MP for East Dunbartonshire in 2005 and lost her seat to John Nicolson of the Scottish National Party ten years later. Swinson regained the seat in 2017, and became the first female Leader of the Liberal Democrats on 22 July 2019. Four months later, she lost her seat by 149 votes to Amy Callaghan of the SNP and consequently was disqualified from continuing as party leader. The couple have three sons together.

Parliament of the United Kingdom
| New constituency | Member of Parliament for Chippenham; 2010–2015 | Succeeded by Michelle Donelan |
