= Rosalind Grender, Baroness Grender =

British life peer (born 1962)

The Right Honourable The Baroness Grender MBE
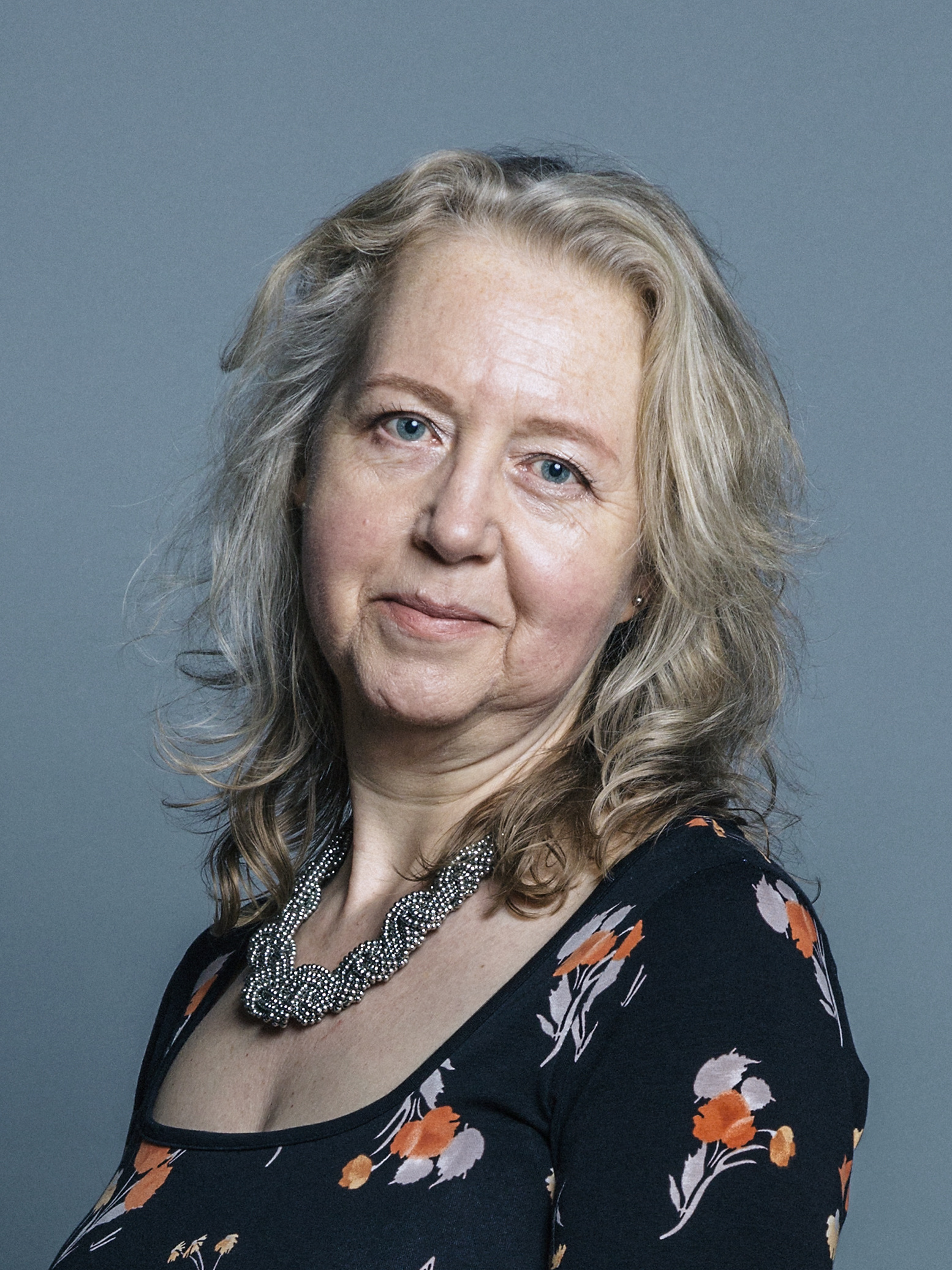

Member of the House of Lords
- Lord Temporal
- Life peerage 4 September 2013

Personal details
- Born: 19 August 1962 (age 64)
- Party: Liberal Democrats

Rosalind Mary Grender, Baroness Grender MBE (born 19 August 1962), known as Olly Grender, is a former Director of Communications for the Liberal Democrats and a party life peer.

== Education ==
Grender was educated at Putney High School, an independent day school for girls in Putney in south west London, followed by Kingston College of Further Education in Kingston-upon-Thames, also in south west London. She did not go to university.

== Life and career ==
In the 1980s, Grender was a member of the National League of Young Liberals' Green Guard. After working as a researcher for the Liberal Democrats, Grender became a speech-writer to Paddy Ashdown in the late 1980s, being awarded a MBE in the 1996 Birthday Honours list. She was Director of Communications for the Liberal Democrats from June 1990 to June 1995 and Director of Communications for Shelter from June 1995 to October 1999, before joining LLM Communications in 2000. Grender sometimes appears on British television, espousing Liberal Democrat points of view.

Grender appeared on Question Time on 21 November 2013, as one of an unusually small panel of three. Over the course of a year, up to September 2011, Grender blogged for the New Statesman magazine.

At the beginning of August 2013, it was announced that Grender was to become a Liberal Democrat life peer, and would be a working member of the House of Lords. Her peerage was created on 4 September 2013 under the title Baroness Grender, of Kingston upon Thames in the London Borough of Kingston upon Thames. She delivered her maiden speech on 28 November 2013.

Discussing the diversity of the House of Lords in an interview with Paul Waugh, published in The House Magazine in October 2012, Grender stated: "What you don’t get is a hairdresser, what you don’t get is a bus driver. And why don’t you get those people? Because it’s unaffordable for most people to do this kind of thing unless you are relying on a partner." The comment attracted adverse media comment from some commentators, though a number of others stated that they believed the comment had been taken out of context, and defended Grender.

Grender was the Liberal Democrats' Director of Communications in the run up to the 2024 United Kingdom general election in Scotland, a campaign notable for the number of attention-grabbing stunts performed by the leader Ed Davey.
