= Tim Farron =

British politician (born 1970)

Tim Farron MP
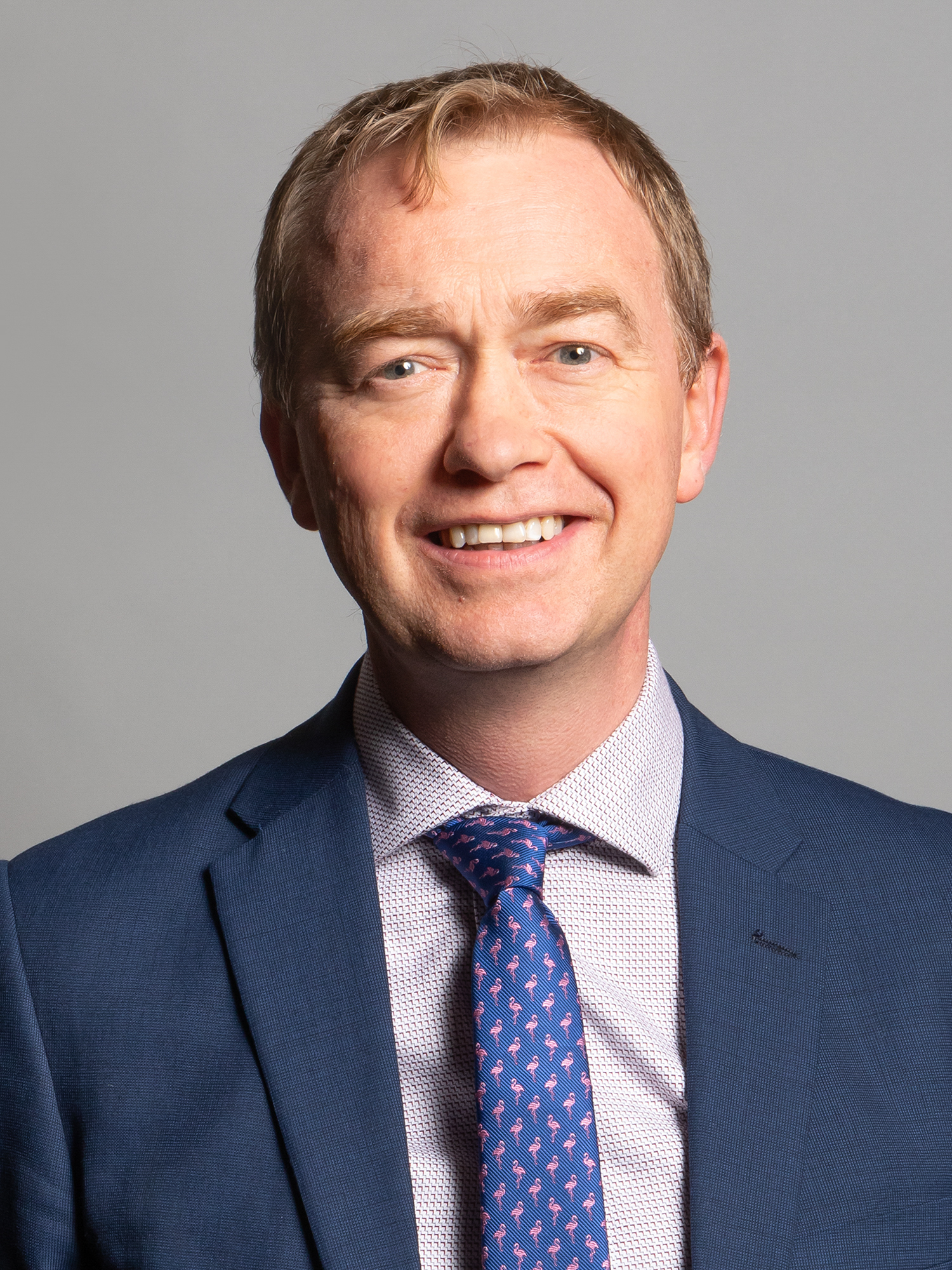
- Official portrait, 2020

Leader of the Liberal Democrats
- In office 16 July 2015 – 20 July 2017
- Deputy: Jo Swinson (2017)
- President: Sal Brinton
- Preceded by: Nick Clegg
- Succeeded by: Vince Cable

President of the Liberal Democrats
- In office 1 January 2011 – 1 January 2015
- Leader: Nick Clegg
- Preceded by: Ros Scott
- Succeeded by: Sal Brinton

Member of Parliament for Westmorland and Lonsdale
- Incumbent
- Assumed office 5 May 2005
- Preceded by: Tim Collins
- Majority: 21,472 (43.3%)

Liberal Democrat portfolios
- 2008–2010, 2017–2019, 2020, 2022–present: Environment, Food and Rural Affairs
- 2015: Foreign Affairs
- 2019–2020: Work and Pensions
- 2019–2020: Northern Powerhouse
- 2020-2022: North Of England
- 2019–2022: Housing, Communities and Local Government

Personal details
- Born: Timothy James Farron; 27 May 1970 (age 56) Preston, Lancashire, England
- Party: Liberal Democrats (since 1988)
- Other political affiliations: Liberal (1986–1988)
- Spouse: Rosemary Cantley (m. 1999)
- Children: 4
- Education: Newcastle University (BA)
- Website: timfarron.co.uk

Timothy James Farron (born 27 May 1970) is a British politician who served as Leader of the Liberal Democrats from 2015 to 2017. He has been the Member of Parliament (MP) for Westmorland and Lonsdale since 2005 and is the Liberal Democrat spokesperson for Environment, Food and Rural Affairs. Before entering politics, he worked in higher education.

Farron was the president of the Liberal Democrats from 2011 to 2014. He was the Liberal Democrats' shadow foreign secretary in 2015 under Nick Clegg's leadership and Spokesperson for Housing, Communities and Local Government from 2019 to 2022, with responsibility for the Northern Powerhouse from 2019 to 2020. He served as Spokesperson for Work and Pensions under Jo Swinson from 2019 to 2020.

== Early life and education ==
Tim Farron was born on 27 May 1970 in Preston, and was educated at Lostock Hall High School and Runshaw College, Leyland, before going on to Newcastle University, where he gained a BA in Politics in 1992. Farron has described how, in his youth, his bedroom bore pictures of widely differing politicians, such as the assassinated United States President John F. Kennedy, former Liberal Party leader Jo Grimond, and then–Prime Minister Margaret Thatcher.

From 1987 to 1992, Farron fronted the Preston-based band Tim Farron and the Voyeurs, also known as Fred The Girl. According to Farron, the band was popular amongst Lancashire's youth after a series of highly successful tours. Farron said the band was offered a record deal with Island Records. However, this claim has been countered by former band members instead describing 'Tim Farron and the Voyeurs' as a "fourth rate New Order".

In 1990, he was elected to the National Union of Students' National Executive. The following year, he was elected president of Newcastle University Students' Union, the first Liberal Democrat to hold the position, having joined the Liberal Party at the age of 16. Before his election to Parliament, Farron worked in higher education at Lancaster University from 1992 to 2002 and St Martin's College, Ambleside, from 2002 to 2005.

== Parliamentary career ==
=== Positions before 2005 ===
Farron contested North West Durham at the 1992 general election, coming third with 14.6% of the vote behind the incumbent Labour Party MP Hilary Armstrong and Conservative candidate Theresa May.

He then served on Lancashire County Council from 1993 to 2000 and was also a councillor for Leyland Central ward on South Ribble Borough Council from 1995 to 1999.

Farron stood in South Ribble at the 1997 general election, coming third with 10.6% of the vote behind the Labour candidate David Borrow and the Conservative candidate Robert Atkins.

He stood for the Liberal Democrats in the North West region in the 1999 European Parliament elections.

At the 2001 general election, Farron contested the Westmorland and Lonsdale seat and finished second, reducing the majority of the sitting Conservative MP Tim Collins to 3,167. He then served as a councillor for the Milnthorpe ward on the South Lakeland District Council from 2004 to 2008.

=== Westmorland and Lonsdale from 2005 win to 2009 ===
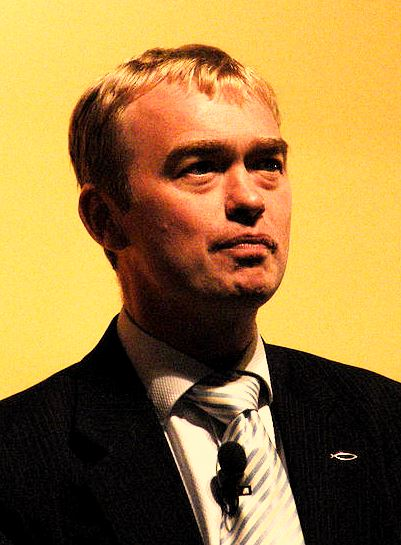
Farron in 2008

At the 2005 general election, Farron again fought Collins in Westmorland and Lonsdale, and this time won the election by a narrow margin of 267 votes. He made his maiden speech in Parliament on 25 May 2005. As a new MP, he became a member of the Education and Skills Select committee and was appointed as Youth Affairs Spokesperson for the Liberal Democrats. In 2005 he founded the all-party parliamentary group on hill farming, of which he was still chair as of November 2023.

During Menzies Campbell's period as the Liberal Democrat leader, Farron was Campbell's parliamentary private secretary. In 2007 he was made a Liberal Democrat spokesman for Home Affairs.

Farron resigned from the front bench of the Liberal Democrats on 5 March 2008 in protest at the party's abstention from a parliamentary vote on a proposed Conservative referendum on Britain's ratification of the Lisbon Treaty. However he later returned to the party's front bench as spokesperson for Environment, Food and Rural Affairs. He is a member of the Beveridge Group within the Liberal Democrats.

=== 2010–2015 ===
At the 2010 general election, Farron was re-elected, increasing his share of the vote to 60% and increasing his majority to 12,264. This contrasted with the Liberal Democrats losing seats elsewhere in the country.

On 27 May 2010, Farron stood for the position of Deputy Leader of the Liberal Democrats, made vacant by the resignation of Vince Cable. On 9 June, Farron lost the competition to the former party President, Simon Hughes. Hughes won by 20 votes; having had 38 nominations from the parliamentary party, compared to Farron's 18.

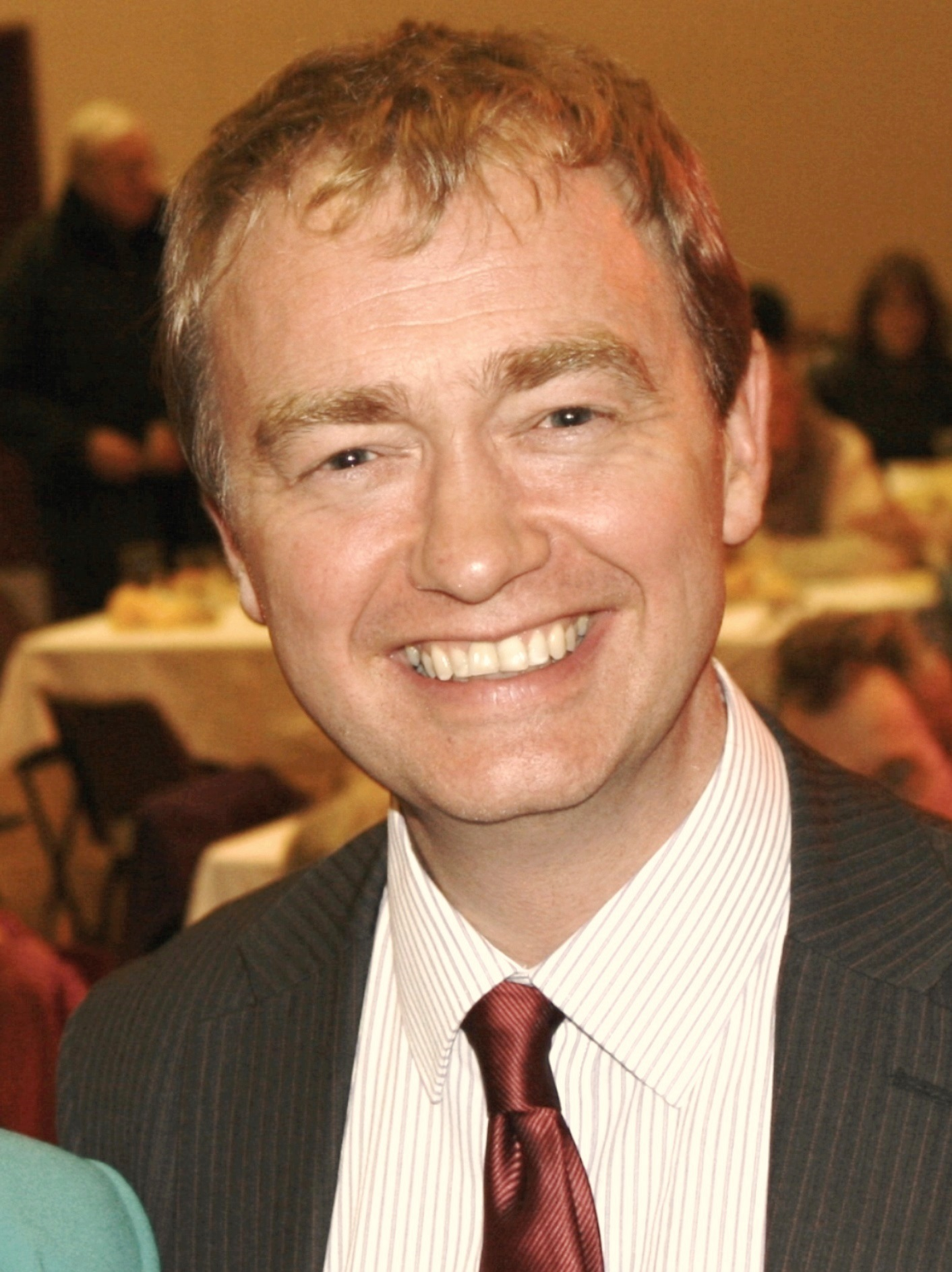
Farron in March 2014

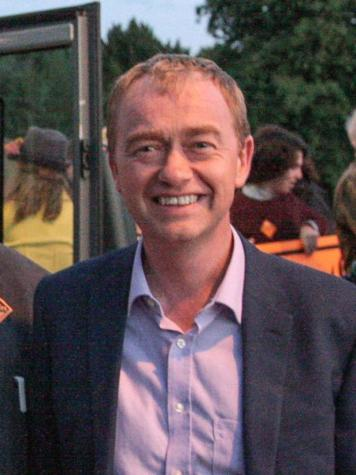
Farron the day before the 2017 General Election

On 16 September 2010, Farron stood for the position of President of the Liberal Democrats following Baroness Scott's decision not to seek re-election. He won the election with 53% of the vote, beating fellow candidate Susan Kramer on 47%.

In March 2012, Farron was one of three MPs who signed a letter sent to the Advertising Standards Authority, criticising their recent decision to stop the Christian group "Healing on the Streets of Bath" from making explicit claims that prayer can heal. The letter called for the ASA to provide indisputable scientific evidence that faith healing did not work; Farron subsequently admitted that the letter was not "well-worded" and that he should not have signed it "as it was written".

Farron was re-elected at the 2015 general election with a decreased vote share of 51.5% and a decreased majority of 8,949. After the election, he was considered a favourite to succeed Nick Clegg as Leader of the Liberal Democrats.

=== Leadership of the Liberal Democrats ===
In May 2015, Farron confirmed his candidacy for the 2015 Liberal Democrats leadership election on BBC Radio 4. On 16 July he won the leadership election with 56.5% of the vote, ahead of Norman Lamb who achieved 43.5%.

Farron's first speech at the September 2015 Liberal Democrat Conference in Bournemouth was praised in the press.

At the 2017 general election, Farron was again re-elected, decreasing his share of the vote to 45.8% and seeing his majority cut to just 777. He stated he would step down as party leader following the election, stating that he had become "torn between living as a faithful Christian and serving as a political leader". He remained in office until the unopposed election of Vince Cable as party leader.

=== Career after party leadership ===
Farron was again re-elected as a member of parliament at the 2019 general election, increasing his share of the vote to 48.9% and increasing his majority to 1,934.

At the 2024 general election, Farron was again re-elected with an increased vote share of 62.7% and an increased majority of 21,472. He received 31,061 votes, the highest number of any candidate in the election.

Since 2021, Farron has hosted a radio show on Premier Christian Radio called 'A Mucky Business with Tim Farron', discussing Christianity and politics.

== Political positions ==
Among political observers, Farron is widely seen as being of a left-leaning political position. In a September 2016 interview, he identified the Liberal Democrats under his leadership as being centre-left.

=== Policy priorities as Liberal Democrat leader ===
In August 2015, Farron identified seven campaigning priorities for the Liberal Democrats. These were rural affairs, the EU referendum, mental health, immigration, civil liberties, the green economy, and housing.

=== Welfare ===
Farron was one of only two Liberal Democrat MPs to vote against the under-occupancy penalty (also known as the bedroom tax) in 2012.

=== Education ===
In December 2010, he voted against increasing the cap on undergraduate university tuition fees from £3,000 to £9,000. Referring to Nick Clegg's earlier pledge not to raise fees—and the previous long-standing Liberal Democrat policy of abolishing them—he said: "Integrity is important. You must not only keep your word but be seen to keep your word. You can say no."

=== Migration ===
He was the first senior British politician to back the EU proposal for a quota to take in refugees during the Mediterranean crisis. He called for the UK to accept up to 60,000 non-EU refugees to help with the influx. He attended the Refugee solidarity march in London in September 2015 and gave the opening speech. In the 2016 Liberal Democrat Spring Conference, Farron accused the government of cowardice and heartlessness over their current refugee policy.

=== Representation of women and minorities ===
Farron said in June 2015 that Lib Dem members of parliament were "too male and too pale", so at least half of the party's target seats would be given women candidates and 10 per cent would have black, Asian, and minority ethnic (BAME) candidates.

Farron's appointment of party spokespeople was applauded for its diversity, with twelve women and ten men given such positions. Women also took high-ranking roles, such as the defence and economics portfolios.

=== LGBT rights ===
In 2007, he voted against the Equality Act (Sexual Orientation) Regulations, which for the first time imposed a general restriction on businesses discriminating against people on the grounds of sexual orientation. In May 2015, regarding a court ruling which found that a Belfast bakery had acted unlawfully in refusing to carry out an order for a cake in support of gay marriage, Farron said that "it's a shame it ended up in court" and "it's important that you stand up for people's rights to have their conscience," but "if you’re providing a service, that’s the key thing – you need to do so without prejudice, without discrimination against those who come through your door."

He voted in favour of allowing marriage between two people of same sex at the second reading of the 2013 Marriage (Same Sex Couples) Bill, but he voted not to timetable the debate on the Bill, which would have made it much more difficult to pass had the House of Commons agreed with his position, over concerns of the impact the "spousal veto" could have on trans people. He was absent for the vote for gay marriage on the third reading of the Bill.

In 2014, he voted in favour of extending the right to same sex marriage to Armed Forces personnel outside the United Kingdom. He held a 90.4% rating on the issue of same sex marriage in September 2015, and 83.9% in February 2023, according to the website Public Whip.

During an interview in 2015 with Cathy Newman for Channel 4 News, following his election as leader, Farron avoided a question from Newman on his personal beliefs regarding gay sex, saying that his "views on personal morality [did not] matter", adding that to "understand Christianity is to understand that we are all sinners". In the build-up to the 2017 General Election he repeated similar lines in another Channel 4 News television interview, before Nigel Evans asked him in Parliament whether he thought being gay was a sin, to which he replied, "I do not" and said that he was "very proud" to have supported his party's efforts to introduce gay marriage. Later, in a BBC interview, he further stated that he did not believe "gay sex" was a sin. Despite this, Lord Paddick resigned from his post as home affairs spokesperson in June 2017 "over concerns about the leader's views on various issues". In 2018, Farron expressed regret over his previous assertions that he did not consider homosexual sex to be sinful, saying he felt under pressure from his party which led him to "foolishly and wrongly" make a statement "that was not right".

Farron's handling of questions regarding LGBT rights and the sinfulness of homosexuality have been heavily criticised by LGBT+ Liberal Democrats, as has his continued association with anti-gay evangelical groups, which has been seen as a "lack of care" to the LGBT community. Former head of the LGBT+ Liberal Democrats, Chris Cooke, made unsubstantiated complaints to the party about Farron's personal conduct when "drunk", and admitted that he "made up a story to cause trouble" following his suspension over Twitter comments directed at Conservative MP Anna Soubry.

=== European Union ===
Despite describing himself as "a bit of a Eurosceptic", Farron strongly supported Britain's membership of the European Union, but criticised David Cameron's renegotiation as "about appealing to careerist Tory MPs, who were selected by Europhobic party members, to persuade them to vote to remain".

In June 2016, Farron stated following the United Kingdom European Union membership referendum in which 51.89% of the voters voted to leave the EU that if the Liberal Democrats were elected in the next parliamentary election, they would not follow through with triggering Article 50 of the Treaty on European Union and leaving the EU but would instead keep the UK in the European Union.

In 2017, Farron spoke out against the government's proposed plan to return to the traditional blue British passport. He criticised the move publicly as part of "ever increasing list of the cost of Brexit" and held the position that the plan was "a completely superficial expenditure which could have been spent on our hospitals and our schools."

=== Saudi Arabia ===
Farron has criticised Britain's close ties with Saudi Arabia. In 2015 he said: "It is time to shine a light onto the shady corners of our relationship with Saudi Arabia. It is time we stood up for civil liberties, human rights and not turn a blind eye because the House of Saud are our 'allies'."

=== Cannabis regulation ===
He supports the complete legalisation of marijuana for both medical and recreational purpose, saying in 2016: "I personally believe the war on drugs is over. We must move from making this a legal issue to one of health."

== Personal life ==
Farron is a non-conformist Protestant and says that "becoming a Christian at the age of eighteen [was] the most massive choice I have made." In 2019 he published an autobiography A Better Ambition: Confessions of a Faithful Liberal describing his life as a Christian and a Liberal.

He married his wife Rosie in 1999.

Farron is a vegetarian. A lifelong fan of Blackburn Rovers, in January 2018 he won an edition of Celebrity Mastermind, with Blackburn Rovers as his specialist subject.

Farron completed the 2021 London Marathon in a time of 4 h 44 min 44 s, raising funds for the Brathay Trust, a Cumbrian youth development charity.

== Selected publications ==
- Farron, Tim (2019). A Better Ambition: Confessions of a Faithful Liberal. SPCK. ISBN 978-0281083589.
- Farron, Tim (2022). A Mucky Business: Why Christians Should Get Involved In Politics. Lisle: InterVarsity Press. ISBN 9781789744446.

Parliament of the United Kingdom
Preceded by Tim Collins	Member of Parliament for Westmorland and Lonsdale; 2005–present	Incumbent
Party political offices
Preceded by Ros Scott	President of the Liberal Democrats; 2011–2015	Succeeded by Sal Brinton
Preceded by Nick Clegg	Leader of the Liberal Democrats; 2015–2017	Succeeded by Vince Cable
