= Kate Parminter, Baroness Parminter =

British politician (born 1964)

The Baroness Parminter
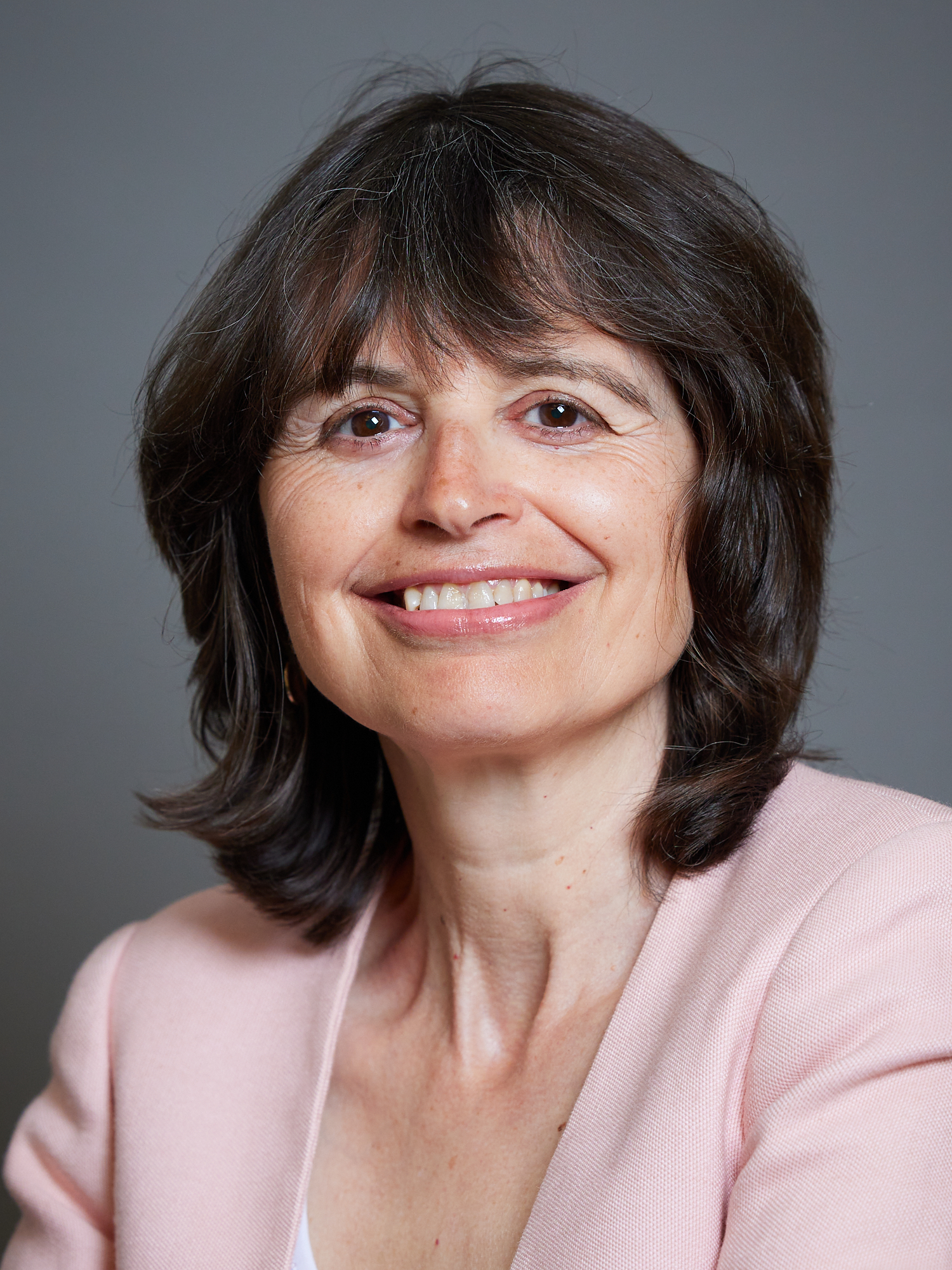

Member of the House of Lords

Kathryn Jane Parminter, Baroness Parminter (born 24 June 1964) is a Liberal Democrat life peer.

She was created Baroness Parminter, of Godalming in the County of Surrey on 15 July 2010 and was introduced in the House of Lords 19 July 2010 and, having supported animal rights causes, chose to wear robes of animal-free ermine. She made her maiden speech two days later in a debate on women in society.

Kate Parminter is a Patron of the Meath Epilepsy Charity.

== Professional career ==
Prior to her elevation, Baroness Parminter worked as a freelance consultant advising charities and companies (including Lloyd’s, the City of London Corporation, Mencap & Age Concern) on charity issues, campaigning and corporate social responsibility. From 1998 to 2004 she was Chief Executive of the Campaign to Protect Rural England, a conservation charity. Between 1990 and 1998 she worked for the Royal Society for the Prevention of Cruelty to Animals, rising from public relations officer to become Head of Public Affairs.

She chaired the Campaign for the Protection of Hunted Animals, which helped to ban hunting, between 1997 and 1998. Before this, she was an account executive at Juliette Hellman PR, a parliamentary researcher for Simon Hughes MP, and a graduate marketing trainee for The Nestlé Co Ltd.

== Political career ==
Parminter was a Liberal Democrat councillor on Horsham District Council in West Sussex between 1987 and 1995. In 2008 she was appointed by Nick Clegg to work on the Party's Reform Commission, which was charged with outlining a route map for the Party's future. She was a member of the Party's Federal Executive Committee, which endorsed the proposal to join the coalition government with the Conservatives in May 2010, and the Federal Finance and Administration Committee. She was offered the position three years before accepting but declined the offer as she wanted to look after her children.

== Personal life ==
Baroness Parminter grew up in West Sussex and was educated at state schools in Horsham. She studied theology at Lady Margaret Hall, Oxford between 1983 and 1986. She lives in Godalming, Surrey with her family.

Orders of precedence in the United Kingdom
Preceded by The Baroness Newlove	Ladies; Baroness Parminter	Followed by The Baroness Hughes of Stretford
