= Norman Lamb =

British politician

The Right Honourable Sir Norman Lamb
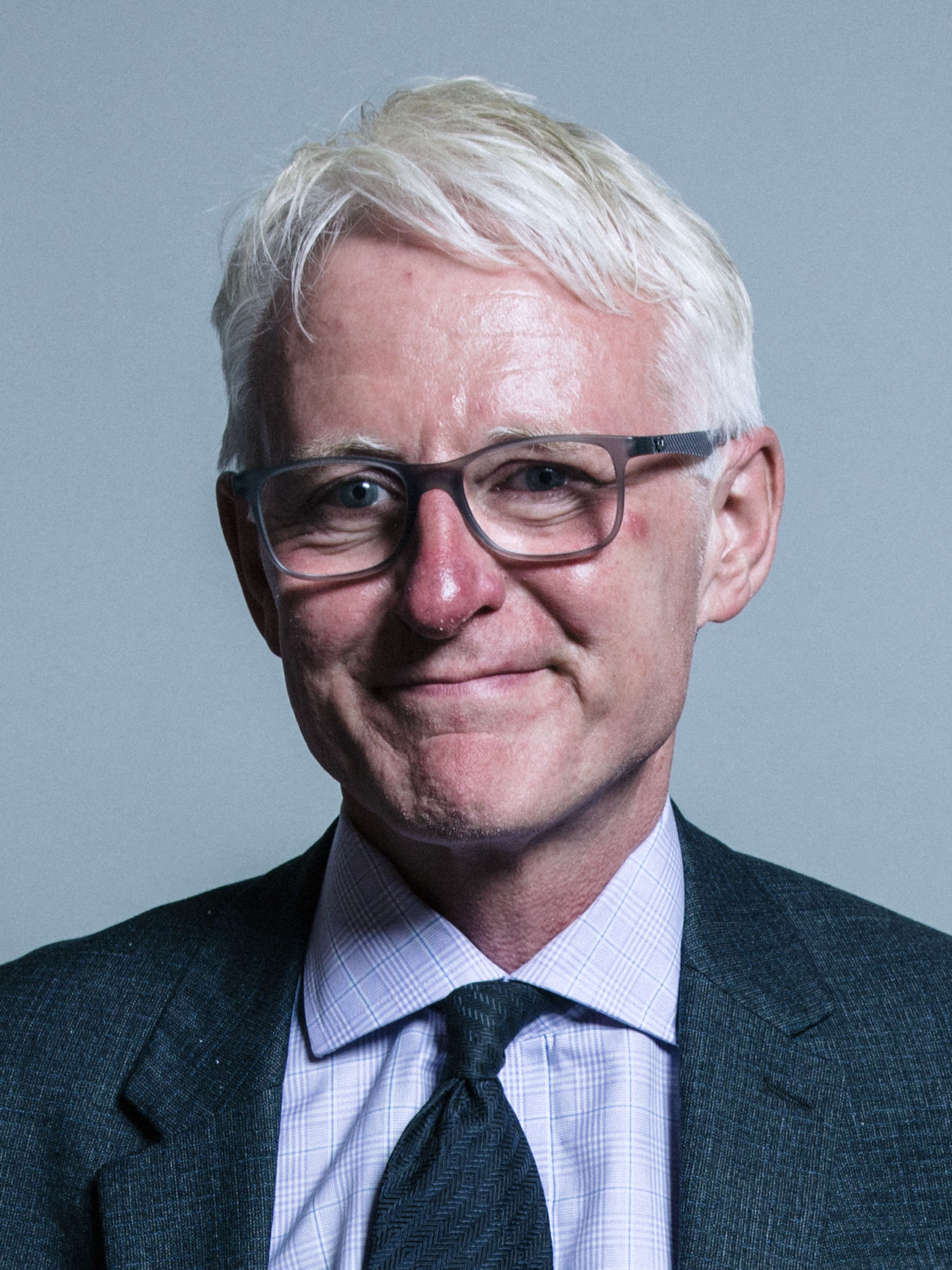
- Official portrait, 2017

Chair of the Science and Technology Committee
- In office 13 July 2017 – 6 November 2019
- Preceded by: Stephen Metcalfe
- Succeeded by: Greg Clark

Minister of State for Care and Support
- In office 4 September 2012 – 8 May 2015
- Prime Minister: David Cameron
- Preceded by: Paul Burstow
- Succeeded by: Alistair Burt

Parliamentary Under-Secretary of State for Employment Relations and Postal Affairs
- In office 3 February 2012 – 4 September 2012
- Prime Minister: David Cameron
- Preceded by: Ed Davey
- Succeeded by: Jo Swinson

Parliamentary private secretary to the Deputy Prime Minister
- In office 12 May 2010 – 3 February 2012
- Prime Minister: David Cameron
- Preceded by: Paul Clark (2007)
- Succeeded by: Jo Swinson
Liberal Democrat frontbench positions
Liberal Democrat Spokesperson for Health^{[a]}
In office 18 December 2006 – 12 October 2017
Leader	Menzies Campbell; Vince Cable (Acting); Nick Clegg; Tim Farron; Vince Cable
Preceded by	Steve Webb
Succeeded by	The Baroness Jolly

Member of Parliament for North Norfolk
- In office 7 June 2001 – 6 November 2019
- Preceded by: David Prior
- Succeeded by: Duncan Baker

Personal details
- Born: Norman Peter Lamb; 16 September 1957 (age 69) Watford, England
- Party: Independent (since 2021)
- Other political affiliations: Labour (until 1981); SDP (1981–1988); Liberal Democrats (1988–2021)
- Spouse: Mary Lamb (m. 1984)
- Children: 2
- Education: University of Leicester
- Website: Official website
- a. Office vacant from 12 May 2010 to 9 January 2015.

Sir Norman Peter Lamb (born 16 September 1957) is a British politician and solicitor. He was the Liberal Democrat Member of Parliament (MP) for North Norfolk from 2001 to 2019, and was the chair of the Science and Technology Select Committee from 2017 to 2019.

Lamb was a candidate in the 2015 Liberal Democrats leadership election. He served most recently as Minister of State for Care and Support in the Department of Health, and previously as Minister of State for Employment Relations in the Department for Business, Innovation and Skills, and earlier as Parliamentary private secretary to Deputy Prime Minister Nick Clegg in the Conservative-Liberal Democrat Coalition Government.

== Early life and career ==
Lamb was born in Watford, Hertfordshire, the son of climatologist Professor Hubert Lamb and the great-grandson of the mathematician Sir Horace Lamb. He went to Wymondham College in Norfolk, then the University of Leicester, graduating with an LLB.

Following his graduation, Lamb worked as a solicitor. He began to specialise in employment law whilst working for Steele and Co Solicitors (now called Steeles Law). His book, Remedies in the Employment Tribunal: Damages for Discrimination and Unfair Dismissal was published in 1998.

Lamb worked for a year as a researcher for Labour MP Greville Janner in the early 1980s. A meeting with Shirley Williams in Parliament at this time, shortly after the formation in 1981 of the Social Democratic Party (SDP), spurred Lamb into front line active politics and he was elected to Norwich City Council where he led the Liberal Democrat group until he stood down in 1991 in order to pursue his Westminster ambitions.

== Parliamentary career ==
Having first stood for election at North Norfolk in 1992, when the Conservative majority was reduced, he came close to a major shock at the 1997 general election, when he reduced a Conservative majority of 12,545 to just 1,293 votes. He was finally elected in 2001, which was his third attempt for the seat; narrowly defeating the incumbent Conservative MP David Prior by 483 votes. He was re-elected in 2005 with a significantly increased majority of 10,606 votes, despite a campaign by the Conservatives and their candidate Iain Dale to unseat him in what was one of their foremost target seats. He was re-elected for a second time in 2010 with a majority of 11,626 votes.

Norman Lamb's first appointment, after being elected, was as a Liberal Democrat spokesman on International Development. Soon after this, he was chosen by then party leader Charles Kennedy to act as his Parliamentary Private Secretary. Following the 2005 general election, Lamb was promoted and appointed Liberal Democrat Trade spokesman (2005–2006), securing the endorsement of the Liberal Democrat Spring 2006 Conference for a policy to partially privatise the Royal Mail, and to use the proceeds to invest in a publicly owned Post Office network. In March 2006, he moved to the post of Chief of Staff to the newly elected leader, Sir Menzies Campbell. In December 2006, he became the party's Health spokesman and was succeeded by Ed Davey as Campbell's Chief of Staff.

At the 2010 general election, Lamb was re-elected for a third time as MP for North Norfolk. Lamb secured a larger majority than before, both in percentage terms and in absolute votes. Following the formation of the Conservative-Liberal Democrat coalition government in May 2010, Lamb was appointed a Parliamentary Private Secretary to Deputy Prime Minister of the United Kingdom, Nick Clegg.

On 3 February 2012, Norman Lamb was promoted to the role of junior minister in the Department for Business, Innovation and Skills after Ed Davey was appointed Secretary of State for Energy and Climate Change following the resignation of Chris Huhne consequent on his prosecution and resignation from Parliament.

In January 2015, The Daily Telegraph highlighted a £497,000 grant to upgrade Sheringham railway station in Lamb's constituency as an example of non-essential money being spent in marginal coalition constituencies ahead of the 2015 general election and accused the government of "electioneering on the taxpayer". Lamb had announced the additional spend as "fantastic news" for the area, with Downing Street subsequently denying that either the funding or Lamb's role in announcing the funding was linked to electoral objectives.

At the 2015 general election, Lamb was returned to Parliament with a significantly reduced majority. At the same election, the Liberal Democrats were reduced to just eight seats and lost their status as the UK's official "third party", having been overtaken by the Scottish National Party in terms of seats won. Nick Clegg resigned as Leader of the Liberal Democrats the following day, on 8 May. Lamb stood at the subsequent Lib Dem leadership election, where he lost to Tim Farron on 16 July. Lamb was re-elected at the 2017 general election with a majority of 6.7%, an election in which he served as Farron's chief of staff.

On 12 July 2017, Lamb beat fellow Lib Dem MP Jo Swinson to become the Chair of the Science and Technology Select Committee by 343 votes to Swinson's 222.

In April 2018, Lamb had a stroke which he attributed to long working days and not getting enough sleep. Shortly after the stroke, Lamb told the Eastern Daily Press that "There is no point killing myself. I've got to work smarter. When a doctor tells you about the importance of sleep you have to take notice ... I am kicking myself that I have allowed this to happen. I am determined to learn a lesson".

On 27 August 2019 Lamb announced he would not be seeking re-election and would stand down at the next UK general election.

In 2018 Lamb became Vice-Chair of the All-Party Parliamentary Group on Whistleblowing. On 24 October 2019 Lamb resigned from the group, writing to its secretariat "I do believe fundamentally in transparency and accountability to the public who ask questions."

== Views ==
Lamb has expressed concern that the number of GPs willing to work in deprived areas is falling and Lamb would like doctors paid a patient premium to work with poor patients. Lamb said, "These figures [indicating a fall in the numbers of doctors working in poor areas] show a really disturbing trend, particularly given that low-income areas were already under-doctored before this latest fall took place".

=== Post 2019 ===
Lamb was also concerned over public spending cuts and a possible no-deal Brexit, writing on Twitter in 2018: "Outrageous! A homelessness crisis, care for elderly & disabled people close to collapse, funds for special needs children cut, people with mental ill health waiting far too long for treatment - and Gov spends billions on preparing for no deal Brexit which is completely avoidable!"

Following the 2019 General Election, Lamb said that he "largely fell out with the party in the period since the referendum", and that the party's position of reversing Brexit had become "more and more extreme". He left the Liberal Democrats in 2021.

He successfully endorsed Liberal Democrat Steff Aquarone in his old North Norfolk seat and the Green Party's Adrian Ramsay in Waveney Valley in the 2024 General Election.

=== Medical transparency ===
In his role as chair of the Science and Technology Committee, Lamb initiated measures that led to a significant improvement in medical research transparency in the UK.

=== Cannabis legalisation ===
Lamb has been an outspoken advocate for the legalisation of cannabis in the UK. In 2018 he introduced a Ten Minute Rule bill to legalise the drug, which was unsuccessful.

In 2019, as part of a BBC documentary, Lamb visited Canada and took cannabis oil, where it is legal.

== Personal life ==
He married Mary in 1984, and they have two sons. They live in Norwich. Their son Archie Lamb was a co-founder of the independent record label Takeover Entertainment which promoted Tinchy Stryder.

Lamb was knighted in the 2019 Birthday Honours. He was appointed chair of South London and Maudsley NHS Foundation Trust in December 2019, he retired from the role in 2025.

== See also ==
- Liberal Democrat frontbench team

Parliament of the United Kingdom
Preceded by David Prior	Member of Parliament for North Norfolk; 2001–2019	Succeeded by Duncan Baker
