= Jo Swinson =

Scottish politician (born 1980)

Jo Swinson CBE FRSA
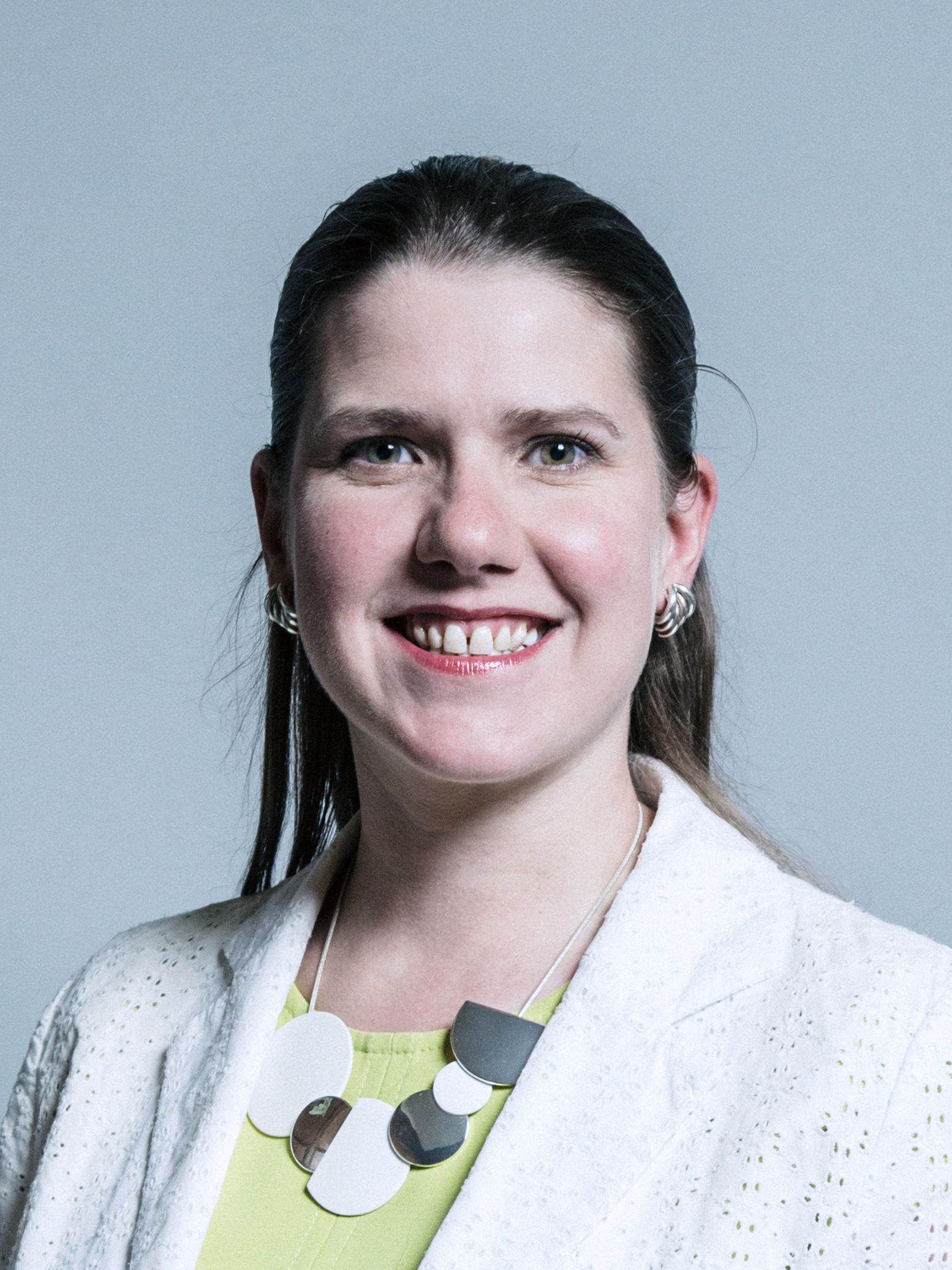
- Official portrait, 2017

Leader of the Liberal Democrats
- In office 22 July 2019 – 13 December 2019
- President: The Baroness Brinton
- Deputy: Ed Davey
- Preceded by: Vince Cable
- Succeeded by: Ed Davey
Party political offices
Deputy Leader of the Liberal Democrats
In office 20 June 2017 – 22 July 2019
Leader	Tim Farron; Vince Cable
Preceded by	Malcolm Bruce
Succeeded by	Ed Davey
Deputy Leader of the Scottish Liberal Democrats
In office 20 September 2010 – 23 September 2012
Leader	Tavish Scott; Willie Rennie
Preceded by	Michael Moore
Succeeded by	Alistair Carmichael
Opposition offices
Liberal Democrat Spokesperson
2005–2006	Culture, Media and Sport
2006–2007	Scotland
2007	Women and Equalities
2008–2010	Foreign Affairs
2017–2019	Foreign Affairs
Ministerial portfolios
Parliamentary Under-Secretary of State
2012–2015	Employment Relations, Consumer and Postal Affairs
2012–2015	Women and Equalities

Member of Parliament for East Dunbartonshire
- In office 8 June 2017 – 6 November 2019
- Preceded by: John Nicolson
- Succeeded by: Amy Callaghan
- In office 5 May 2005 – 30 March 2015
- Preceded by: Constituency established
- Succeeded by: John Nicolson

Personal details
- Born: Joanne Kate Swinson; 5 February 1980 (age 46) Glasgow, Scotland
- Party: Liberal Democrats
- Spouse: Duncan Hames (m. 2011)
- Children: 3
- Education: London School of Economics (BSc)
- Jo Swinson's voice Swinson on the UK's entry to the Extractive Industries Transparency Initiative; Recorded 23 May 2013

Joanne Kate Swinson (born 5 February 1980) is a Scottish former politician who was Leader of the Liberal Democrats from July to December 2019. Swinson was Member of Parliament (MP) for East Dunbartonshire from 2005 to 2015 and 2017 to 2019. In September 2020, Swinson became Director of Partners for a New Economy (P4NE).

Born in Glasgow, Swinson studied at the London School of Economics and briefly worked in public relations before being elected to the House of Commons aged 25, becoming the youngest MP at the time. She was a Liberal Democrat Spokesperson covering various portfolios, including Scotland, Women and Equalities, Communities and Local Government, and Foreign and Commonwealth Affairs.

In 2010, after the Liberal Democrats entered into a coalition government with the Conservative Party, Swinson became Parliamentary Private Secretary to Deputy Prime Minister Nick Clegg, and was later appointed Parliamentary Under Secretary of State for Employment Relations and Postal Affairs. She lost her seat in the 2015 election, but regained it in the snap election held two years later. Shortly after returning to Parliament, she was elected unopposed as Deputy Leader of the Liberal Democrats. In July 2019, following the retirement of Vince Cable, Swinson defeated Ed Davey in the leadership election.

Swinson led her party through the 2019 general election, suggesting she could lead a Liberal Democrat majority government that would revoke Article 50 and cancel Brexit. Instead, the Liberal Democrats sustained a net loss in seats, including Swinson's own to Scottish National Party candidate Amy Callaghan. Swinson's unseating disqualified her from continuing as party leader — she is the only leader of the modern Liberal Democrats to have been disqualified this way. At less than five months, her tenure as leader is the shortest in the party's history, and she was succeeded by Davey.

== Early life and education ==
Swinson was born in Glasgow on 5 February 1980, the daughter of Peter and Annette Swinson. She was educated at Douglas Academy, a mixed state school in the town of Milngavie in East Dunbartonshire in western Scotland, followed by the London School of Economics (LSE), where she studied Management, gaining a first-class Bachelor of Science degree in 2000. She signed up as an active member of the Liberal Democrats at the age of 17.

== Early career ==
After graduating from the LSE, Swinson moved to Yorkshire and worked for Ace Visual and Sound Systems in Thorne, before becoming a marketing and public relations manager for Hull-based commercial radio station Viking FM from December 2000, and media company Space and People.

At the age of 21, Swinson stood unsuccessfully in the Kingston upon Hull East constituency in the 2001 general election, but gained a 6% swing from John Prescott, then the Deputy Prime Minister of the United Kingdom. In 2003, she unsuccessfully contested the Strathkelvin and Bearsden constituency in the Scottish Parliament election, finishing third with 14% of the vote.

== Member of Parliament (2005–2015) ==
Swinson was elected to the House of Commons as the MP for East Dunbartonshire at the 2005 general election. She defeated John Lyons of Labour by 4,061 votes, and was the first ever Member of Parliament born in the 1980s. As the youngest MP she replaced fellow Lib Dem MP Sarah Teather as the "Baby of the House". This lasted until 2009, when Conservative MP Chloe Smith was elected at the Norwich North by-election.

Swinson was vocal in her opposition to the Iraq War and the Labour government's proposals for national identity cards. She has supported measures both by individuals and government to tackle climate change such as conserving energy in the home and the Liberal Democrat policy of introducing green taxes while reducing income tax to offset the burden. She supports reducing the voting age to 16 as one way of engaging young people in politics. She believes more women should be involved in politics but that encouragement is better than affirmative action in achieving this. She opposes positive discrimination to address gender imbalance, and led the argument against positive discrimination to select her party's candidates at their national party conference in 2002, wearing a pink T-shirt inscribed with the slogan, "I am not a token woman".

Swinson has also called for a "wellbeing index" to be introduced, to be compared against GDP, and tabled an early day motion on the issue in 2008, gaining 50 signatures. She found support from MPs such as Vince Cable and Angela Eagle. Swinson cited the fact that although standard of living had increased, people's level of wellbeing had been virtually static for some time, according to polls.

Swinson believed that new prisons ought not to be built, and had campaigned vocally but without success against the rebuilding of a prison at Bishopbriggs within the constituency. She had said that if a prison were to be built it must not be built cheaply, and that it ought not to be named after the town in which it was to be sited. The campaign to give the prison its original name was ultimately successful, for the replacement prison was to retain its original name, Lowmoss Prison.

Swinson is an active campaigner against excessive packaging of chocolate Easter eggs. Each year from 2007 saw her attack confectionery manufacturers for wasteful use of non-recyclable materials in packaging of the seasonal goods. She has named Guylian as the worst offender, followed by Lindt, Baileys and Cadbury.

Swinson successfully held her seat of East Dunbartonshire in the 2010 general election, although with a slightly decreased majority. Her party, the Liberal Democrats, subsequently entered into a coalition with the Conservative Party.

=== Parliamentary Private Secretary ===
In November 2010, Swinson was made parliamentary private secretary to the then Business Secretary Vince Cable.

In December 2010, she was one of 27 Liberal Democrat MPs who voted in favour of allowing universities to raise tuition fees up to £9,000 per year.

In February 2012, Swinson replaced Norman Lamb as Parliamentary Private Secretary to the then Liberal Democrat Leader and Deputy Prime Minister Nick Clegg, holding this position until her promotion to government minister later that year.

=== Business Minister (2012–2015) ===
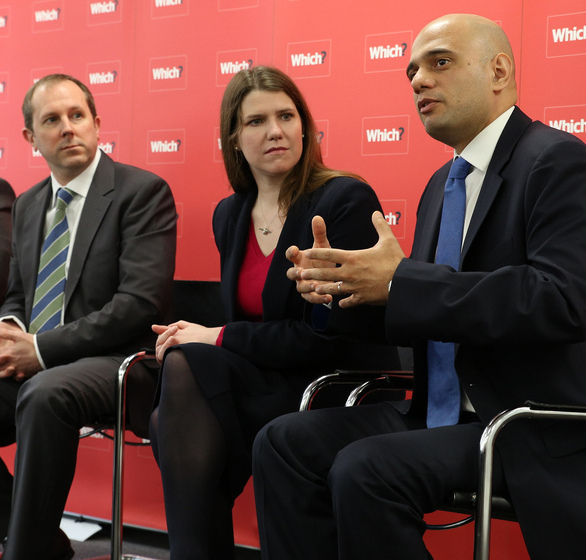
Swinson with the then Treasury minister Sajid Javid discussing payday lending at the Which? ministerial credit visit in 2013

In September 2012, Swinson was appointed Under Secretary of State for Employment Relations and Consumer Affairs in a reshuffle by then Prime Minister David Cameron. She maintained this role for the remainder of the Cameron–Clegg coalition, except for several months of maternity leave between 2013 and 2014.

Swinson initially focused efforts on scrapping the 1871 Pedlars Act, which prevents pedlars (travelling salesmen) and street traders from trading without first acquiring a certificate from the police. In November 2012, Swinson said that the proposed deregulation would help "eliminate barriers to street traders and pedlars by making it easier to trade, boosting retail and helping small traders – including many young entrepreneurs – to expand and grow". The proposal was criticised by the Local Government Association, which claimed that it would lead to a 'free for all' of pedlars targeting vulnerable people. By 2014, however, Swinson announced she would seek to amend rather than repeal the laws.

Swinson opposed forcing companies to adopt gender quotas, stating that such a move would "negatively affect" the performance of businesses. She instead promoted voluntary solutions, telling an event organised by the British Chambers of Commerce, "What women need is confidence, not quotas. So rather than telling companies what to do, we're encouraging them to see the real business benefits of taking voluntary action."

From 2013, Swinson sought to promote fathers' rights in regard to parental leave, bringing forth new legislation which allowed parents to divide parental leave between themselves with an aim to encourage fathers to spend more time with their newborn infants.

In October 2013, controversy emerged after MPs in the House of Commons allowed Swinson, then pregnant, to stand for 20 minutes without offering her a seat. This led to political debate and comment about whether or not it was sexist to give up a seat for a pregnant woman, with Prime Minister David Cameron wading into the row to say that offering pregnant women seats was the right thing to do. Swinson herself later commented that it was not sexist to offer a pregnant woman a seat, and that it was "great for people to offer, and part of life's little courtesies".

In the area of employment, she was supportive of both Zero-hour contracts and flexible working, seeking to promote the latter especially. On minimum wage, in February 2013 Swinson joined calls by other ministers to warn that "caution" was required when increasing it any further amid claims that minimum wage could be cut or frozen if it began costing jobs. Swinson pledged £80,000 of government financial support for the Corporate Human Rights Benchmark, an initiative led by corporations including Aviva Investors and Calvert which measures and ranks performance of global companies in regard to human rights.

Swinson was keen to promote employee ownership, such as employee ownership of shares, through the establishment of a FTSE-compliant UK Employee Ownership Index, supporting measures to reduce regulations for companies choosing to adopt employee ownership practices, and a scheme allowing companies to contractually offer employees £2,000 to £50,000 worth of shares (which would be exempted from capital gains tax) in exchange for waiving certain employee rights. Swinson traced employee ownership back to the philosophy of Jeremy Bentham, and claimed that such ownership models improve productivity and lower absenteeism in staff.

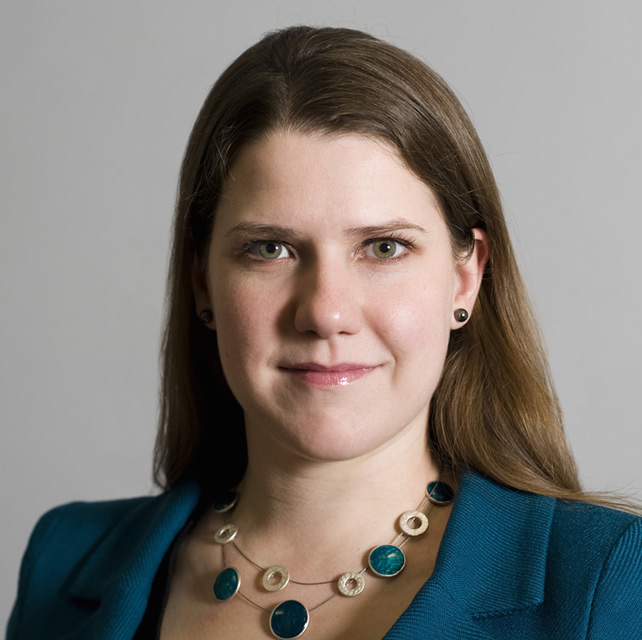
Ministerial portrait, 2014

By 2014, it was being reported that Swinson was tipped to replace Alistair Carmichael as Scottish Secretary and enter the Cabinet in a potential reshuffle, which at the time would have made her the youngest female Cabinet member ever and the first Cabinet member to be born in the 1980s. At the same time, however, electoral projections for the 2015 general election showed Swinson was under serious risk of losing her East Dunbartonshire seat to a surge of Scottish National Party support.

Swinson introduced to parliament the Consumer Rights Act 2015 on 23 January 2014, so as to consolidate and update consumer protection law and thereby provide a "modern framework of consumer rights".

Shortly before the 2015 general election, The Times and the Financial Times reported that Swinson was one of a number of prominent 'right-leaning' Liberal Democrat MPs, aligned to then Liberal Democrat leader Nick Clegg, deliberately excluded from campaign funding by former leading Liberal Democrat peer and donor Matthew Oakeshott even though their seats, including Swinson's, were vulnerable marginals.

Swinson was featured in the 2011, 2012, 2013, and 2014 editions of the 'London's 1000 most influential people' list by the Evening Standard.

=== 2015 and 2017 general elections ===
Swinson lost her parliamentary seat in the 2015 general election to Scottish National Party candidate John Nicolson by 2,167 votes (4.0%). She stood again for her former seat during the 2017 general election and won with a lead of 5,339 votes (10.3%) over Nicolson. During this time, she wrote her book Equal Power: And How You Can Make It Happen.

Between 2017 and 2018, Swinson received political funding from Mark Petterson, the director of Warwick Energy Ltd, which has fracking licences across England. She also voted against plans to ban fracking in the UK.

== Deputy Leader of the Liberal Democrats (2017–2019) ==
Following the resignation of Tim Farron as Liberal Democrat leader on 14 June 2017, Swinson was named by the BBC as one of the possible contenders for the leadership, along with Norman Lamb and Vince Cable. She later announced that she would not seek the leadership; instead, she became Deputy Leader after being, at the close of nominations, the only candidate for that position.

As of October 2017, she was her party's Spokesperson for Foreign and Commonwealth Affairs.

At the Liberal Democrat autumn conference of 2017, Swinson drew media attention for using the phrase "Faragey, Trumpy, angry, arsey, shouty slogans" in criticising populism. In the same speech she called for the state visit of U.S. President Donald Trump to be cancelled and warned about Brexit.

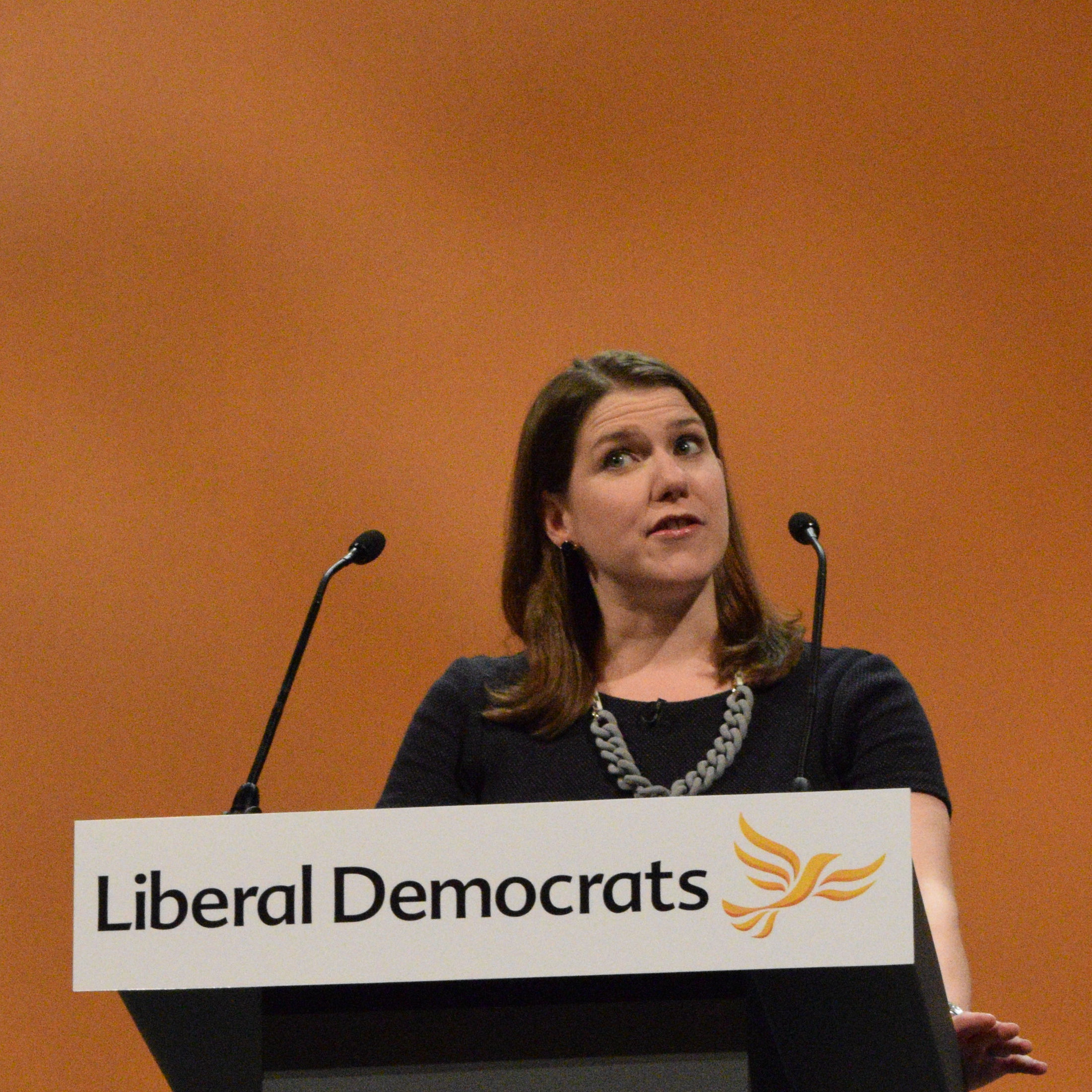
Swinson in 2017 as Deputy Leader of the Liberal Democrats

In February 2018, Swinson's first book, Equal Power: And How You Can Make It Happen, was published by Atlantic Books. Discussing her book, Swinson explained that government has "limitations" when addressing gender inequality, so her book instead mainly suggests ideas for people to make changes in their own homes and workplaces. The Irish Times likened Equal Power to the "corporate feminism" of Sheryl Sandberg's Lean In, while The Herald also noted that "A read of Equal Power makes it apparent that Swinson is a fan of Sheryl Sandberg's Lean In." Swinson's book was featured at the Aye Write! literary festival in Glasgow.

In a March 2018 article for The Mail on Sunday, Swinson came out in favour of erecting a statue of former Prime Minister Margaret Thatcher in Parliament Square. She justified her position on feminist grounds and claimed that Thatcher was able to "single-handedly transform the fortunes of women", accusing opponents of the Thatcher statue as being "pretty sexist". Swinson praised Thatcher for her skills in negotiating the UK rebate and for taking the UK into the single market, but was also critical of Thatcher for the poll tax and stressed she did not consider herself a Thatcherite. In addition, she wrote that there should be a statue of the first female First Minister of Scotland Nicola Sturgeon in time, though she disagrees with Scottish independence.

In July 2018, Swinson was absent for key votes on the Brexit negotiations, having been on maternity leave following the birth of her second son. During this period, she attended an anti–Donald Trump protest, drawing criticism from Labour MP Kate Hoey on The Spectator's podcast. Conservative Party Chairman Brandon Lewis had formally agreed not to vote, so that Swinson's absence would not affect the result. Lewis voted with the government nonetheless, leading Swinson to accuse the government of resorting to "desperate stuff" and a "calculated, deliberate breaking of trust". Lewis apologised, alongside Cabinet Office minister David Lidington and government chief whip Julian Smith. Apologising on Twitter, Lewis said that it was an "honest mistake made by the whips in fast-moving circumstances."

== Leader of the Liberal Democrats (2019) ==
In May 2019, Vince Cable announced he would relinquish his role as leader of the Liberal Democrats in July, triggering a leadership election. Subsequently, while appearing on the 30 May edition of the BBC political discussion programme Question Time, Swinson confirmed that she would put her name forward in the forthcoming contest.

On 22 July 2019, Swinson was elected the first female leader of the Liberal Democrats, with 47,997 (62.8%) votes, gaining a clear victory over Sir Ed Davey, with 28,021 votes. She was the first leader of a major British political party who was born in the 1980s. Under her leadership, the party's candidate and Welsh Liberal Democrats leader Jane Dodds won the Brecon and Radnorshire by-election, following a "remain alliance" in which Change UK, Plaid Cymru and the Green Party agreed not to stand candidates. The party's membership also rose to a record 115,000+ members, with many party supporters attributing this rise to what they called "the Swinson surge".

In her first Leader's Speech to the Liberal Democrat Federal Conference, on 17 September 2019, Swinson said that Boris Johnson "claims he can negotiate a Brexit deal in a month. I wouldn't hold out much hope: yesterday he couldn't negotiate where to have a press conference".

=== 2019 election campaign ===
Swinson campaigned on a platform of revoking Article 50 if the Liberal Democrats formed the government. The policy proved to be controversial with both Remain and Leave voters, who criticised it as undemocratic. Swinson launched her campaign by declaring that she was "a candidate to be prime minister", and suggesting her party could win a majority. However, poll ratings for the party were poor and Swinson's personal ratings declined throughout the campaign.

During the campaign, Swinson clashed with Nicola Sturgeon, the First Minister of Scotland on the subject of nuclear weapons. Asked if she would be prepared to use nuclear weapons, Swinson replied simply "yes". Sturgeon commented that "It's sickening to hear this question asked and answered as if it's some kind of virility test and without any context... Using nuclear weapons would mean killing millions of people." Swinson was subject to a fake news story in which she was accused of 'hunting squirrels'. First Draft News, an organisation that seeks to identify online misinformation, found that the claim originated from a doctored video clip, with a spokesperson for the organisation warning that the propagation of false stories such as this were leading to the "gentle erosion of trust".

In November 2019, Swinson also was confronted by Jay Sutherland, a student activist in Scotland. Along with the leader of the Scottish Liberal Democrats, Willie Rennie, Swinson was accused of supporting austerity measures. The student said "People are dying here, they're in poverty, because of what you’ve done on austerity". The altercation was featured heavily on British news outlets. Afterward, the Liberal Democrats reaffirmed that the party "does not have a problem attracting young voters".

Swinson's campaign was reported to be funded by companies selling puberty blockers, a medication with significant uncertainties around long-term adverse health effects. In December 2019, it was reported that a pharmaceutical firm marketing drugs to delay puberty had donated £100,000 to the Liberal Democrats. When questioned about her beliefs on sex and gender, Swinson replied that she didn't "think things are as binary as they are often presented".

Swinson ceased to be leader on 13 December 2019, when in the general election she lost her own seat in parliament to the SNP's Amy Callaghan. The party's rules disqualified her from continuing as its leader. She had led the party for 144 days. As well as losing seats, the Liberal Democrats failed to make predicted gains. An internal party review said that their election campaign was worsened by "an inexperienced inner circle" around Swinson. It said that voters who were neither fervently leave nor remain were "effectively ignored" by her promise to revoke Article 50. On 27 August 2020, Sir Ed Davey won the leadership election to succeed her.

== Later career ==
In July 2020, Swinson accepted a position as visiting professor at Cranfield School of Management in Bedfordshire. In September 2020, she became Director of Partners for a New Economy (P4NE).

== Personal life ==
On 13 May 2011, Swinson married then–fellow Liberal Democrat MP Duncan Hames. The couple's first child, Andrew, was born in December 2013. A second son, Gabriel, was born in June 2018. Swinson gave birth to the couple's third son, Robin, on 28 July 2023.

Swinson completed the Loch Ness Marathon in 2007, the 2011 London Marathon and the inaugural Stirling Scottish Marathon in 2017. Through this, she has raised money for the Anaphylaxis Campaign and Bloodwise. She ran the London Landmarks Half Marathon in March 2019 in memory of her father, who had died of blood cancer the previous year.

Having a peanut allergy, Swinson sustained anaphylactic shock in May 2013 after eating a biscuit containing nuts in Glasgow. She collapsed with breathing difficulty; she recovered upon administration of adrenaline, and with an overnight stay in hospital.

Swinson was made a Commander of the Order of the British Empire (CBE) in the 2018 New Year Honours for political and public service. On receiving the honour, Swinson said she was privileged "to be listed among so many remarkable people from all walks of life, making amazing contributions right across our country".

Swinson is a humanist and is a member of the humanist charity Humanists UK.

Parliament of the United Kingdom
New constituency	Member of Parliament for East Dunbartonshire; 2005–2015	Succeeded by John Nicolson
Preceded by John Nicolson	Member of Parliament for East Dunbartonshire; 2017–2019	Succeeded by Amy Callaghan
Preceded by Sarah Teather	Baby of the House; 2005-2009	Succeeded by Chloe Smith
Party political offices
Preceded by Malcolm Bruce	Deputy Leader of the Liberal Democrats; 2017–2019	Succeeded by Ed Davey
Preceded by Vince Cable	Leader of the Liberal Democrats; 2019	Succeeded by Ed Davey
