= LGBT+ Liberal Democrats =

Group within the Liberal Democrats British political party

- Rainbow Bird of Liberty logo
- President: Layla Moran
- Chairperson: Lucas North
- Founded: 1988
- Ideology: Liberalism; Pro-Europeanism
- Position: Centre to centre-left
- Mother party: Liberal Democrats
- Website: http://lgbt.libdems.org.uk/

LGBT+ Liberal Democrats is a British lesbian, gay, bisexual, transgender and other sexual minorities equality group of the Liberal Democrats political party. The organisation is one of several Specified Associated Organisations, giving it special status within the party, and has been referred to as one of the "most important" of such groups. The group campaigns both within the party and UK-wide on LGBT+ issues, as well as mentoring and providing advice to the party's candidates.

== Formation and early years ==
Initially known as Democrats for Lesbian & Gay Action, or DELGA for short, the organisation was formed in 1988 from the groups "Liberal Lesbian & Gay Action" and "Social Democrats for Lesbian & Gay Action". The parent parties of those organisations, the Liberal Party and SDP, had merged to form the Social and Liberal Democrats, known generally as the Democrats. The name was officially altered to be Liberal Democrats for Lesbian, Gay, Bisexual and Transgender Action in 1996, including bisexual and transgender people in the title and reflecting the renaming of the party to the Liberal Democrats. However, the shorthand DELGA remained in use until 2011, when the organisation renamed to "LGBT+ Liberal Democrats".

One of the early campaigns by the group was "16 or bust". Started in 1991, it pushed to lower the age of consent for sex between gay men from 21 to 16, equal with heterosexual couples. This was in contrast to the approach of organisations such as Stonewall who were in favour of lowering the age to 18, seeing it as an achievable compromise. Although the first round of votes in parliament only lowered the age of consent to 18, it was finally brought in line with opposite-sex couples in 2000.

== Policy successes ==
Because LGBT+ Liberal Democrats is recognised as a Specified Associated Organisation of the Liberal Democrat party it is able to put forward policy motions to the twice-yearly Federal Conference, the main democratic policy making forum of the party.

Motions accepted for debate and passed into party policy have included:

- 2011: "Science Not Stigma" motion on blood donation rules in the UK.
- 2010: "Equal Marriage in the United Kingdom" motion on the introduction of same-sex marriage.
- 2008: "Deportation to States which Persecute on the Grounds of Sexuality and Gender Identity" on treatment of LGBT asylum seekers.
- 1988: Repeal of Section 28, Criminalisation of incitement to hatred on the grounds of sexual orientation, prohibition of legal and social discrimination on the grounds of sexual orientation.

== Fringe events ==
LGBT+ Liberal Democrats runs a series of fringe events discussing various topic issues at Liberal Democrat conference each year, including regular joint fringes with LGBTQ+ campaigning organisation Stonewall.

Events at a joint 2011 fringe received widespread coverage after then Stonewall Chair, Ben Summerskill stated that his organisation did not support equal marriage and that he believed it would cost £5 billion to implement. The statement resulted in critical comments from prominent campaigner Peter Tatchell and openly gay Liberal Democrat MP Stephen Gilbert, who stated "it should not be up to me as a member of parliament to lobby Stonewall on equal rights. It should be Stonewall lobbying me". The controversy later caused a split within Stonewall itself, following further criticism from founder members Ian McKellen and Michael Cashman.

== 2013 apologies ==
In 2013, both G4S and TalkTalk were forced to apologise to the organisation, following separate incidents. In the first incident G4S, who provided conference security, had insisted on checking banners being carried by members of the group for "potentially offensive campaign material". Three months later, TalkTalk issued an apology after their web filter classified the organisation's web site as pornographic.

== Views on MPs ==
=== Tim Farron ===
Many members of the group, while denying that former party leader Tim Farron is a homophobe, have been openly critical of his answers to questions about his Christian views on the sinfulness of gay sex during the 2017 general election, viewing it as a distraction from the party's pro-LGBTQ+ record. Former head of the LGBT+ Liberal Democrats Chris Cooke made unsubstantiated complaints to the party about Farron's personal conduct when "drunk", and admitted that he "made up a story to cause trouble" following his suspension over Twitter comments directed at Conservative MP Anna Soubry.

Farron's continued fraternisation with evangelical anti-'gay lobby' groups has been seen by the LGBT+ Liberal Democrats as a lapse of judgement, with them asking him to apologise for a "lack of care" shown to the LGBTQ+ community.

=== Phillip Lee ===
On 3 September 2019, Conservative MP Phillip Lee joined the Lib Dems in opposition to Brexit.

Moments after he had defected, LGBT+ Liberal Democrat chair Jennie Rigg along with the vice chair, executive members and several other activists left the party in opposition to Lee's views on same-sex marriage and his previous campaign to bar people with HIV from being able to come to the UK.

A subsequent meeting took place between Lee and the LGBT+ Lib Dems at their annual conference to discuss his views.

Having previously said "Marriage should be left to the churches and the redefinition of marriage simply required more debate and consultation", Lee later insisted that his views on LGBTQ+ rights had been misrepresented, stating that he was right to abstain on the same-sex marriage vote because it was a "liberal" choice and part of a "nuanced argument". Jennie Rigg later rejoined the Liberal Democrats, after Lee lost his seat in the following general election.

== Executive committee ==
The oversight of the LGBT+ Liberal Democrats is managed by its Officers and Executive Members. The executive committee, consisting of members elected by the party's membership, individuals co-opted by the Executive, and representatives from other Liberal Democrat affiliated organisations, is tasked with this responsibility. The present Executive assumed their roles on 1 January 2026.

=== 2026 Executive committee ===
==== Executive Officers ====
- Chairs: Lucas North
- Vice-Chair: Christina Nowell
- Treasurer: Simon Lepori
- Secretary: John Grout
- Membership Officer: Onyx Rist
- Policy Officers: Artie Khovanov

==== Executive Members ====
There are eight elected members and up to three co-opted members.

- Alisdair Calder McGregor
- Caron Lindsay
- Christine Whelan
- Esther Foulsham
- Harry Marchington
- Jennie Rigg
- Jude Parker
- Megan Challinor
- Rebecca Jones
- Tara Foster

== Previous chairs ==
- Charley Hasted and Luke Allan (Jan 2025 – Jan 2026)
- Charley Hasted (Jan 2023 – Dec 2024)
- Gareth Lewis Shelton (Sept 2020 – Dec 2022)
- Dave Page (Sept 2019 – June 2020)
- Jennie Rigg (Feb 2017 – Sept 2019)
- Chris Cooke (Jan – Feb 2017)
- Adrian Hyyrylainen-Trett (2016)
- Dave Page (2015)
- Ed Fordham (2014)
- Adrian Hyyrylainen-Trett (July 2010 – 2013)
- Benji Starr (Jan – Jun 2010)
- Jen Yockney (2007–2009)
- Kelvin Meyrick (2006)
- Richard Porter (2005)
- Alison Wheeler (2004)
- Denys Robinson (2003)
- Hannah Kaitlin-Boyer (2001–2002)
- Jonathan Simpson (1998–2000)
- Mark Baker (1998)
- Brian Stone (1989)

== See also ==
- List of LGBT-related organizations
- LGBTQ rights in the United Kingdom
