= Northern Ireland Liberal Democrats =

- Founded: 1988
- Headquarters: Belfast
- Youth wing: Young Liberals
- Ideology: Liberalism; Social liberalism; Classical liberalism; Pro-Europeanism
- Political position: Centre to centre-left
- National affiliation: Liberal Democrats
- European affiliation: Alliance of Liberals and Democrats for Europe
- International affiliation: Liberal International
- Colours: Orange
- House of Commons (NI Seats): 0 / 18
- House of Lords: 1 / 783
- NI Assembly: 0 / 90
- Local government: 0 / 462

Website
- libdemsni.wordpress.com

The Northern Ireland Liberal Democrats is a local party of the Liberal Democrats that operates in Northern Ireland. Unlike its counterparts in England, Scotland and Wales, the Northern Ireland party is not a state party within the federal Liberal Democrats (though there does exist constitutional provision for it to be established so by conference) but a local party similar to constituency parties in the rest of the UK. The Liberal Democrats do not contest elections in Northern Ireland due to its alliance with the Alliance Party.

== Members ==
Several individuals, including former Alliance Party leader David Ford, hold membership of both the Alliance Party and the Liberal Democrats. Alliance members of the House of Lords take the Liberal Democrat whip on non-Northern Ireland issues. John Alderdice was leader of Alliance 1987–1998 and has sat as a Lib Dem peer since 1996.

Alliance Party MP Naomi Long (2010–2015) did not take the Liberal Democrat Whip in the House of Commons as she is not a Liberal Democrat member.

In January 2016, the Chair of the Northern Ireland local party was Stephen Glenn. The previous chair was John O’Neill.

== See also ==
- English Liberal Democrats
- Scottish Liberal Democrats
- Welsh Liberal Democrats
