= Specified Associated Organisation =

A Specified Associated Organisation is an organised group of members of the British Liberal Democrats formed around a specific trait and designated by the Federal Board as affiliates of the party. SAOs are distinguished from other Liberal Democrat pressure groups (also known as Associated Organizations) in that SAOs can review and input policies.

As of 2024, the current SAOs include:

- Association of Liberal Democrat Councillors and Campaigners (ALDC),
- Association of Liberal Democrat Engineers and Scientists (ALDES),
- Liberal Democrat Campaign for Racial Equality (LDCRE),
- LGBT+ Liberal Democrats,
- Liberal Democrat Lawyers’ Association (LDLA)
- Liberal Democrat Women (LDW),
- Young Liberals,
- Parliamentary Candidates’ Association (PCA),
- Liberal Democrat Christian Forum (LDCF).

== See also ==
- Socialist society
