= Liberal Democrats (UK) =

Political party

- Abbreviation: Lib Dems
- Governing body: Federal Board
- Leader: Ed Davey
- Deputy Leader: Daisy Cooper
- Lords Leader: The Lord Purvis of Tweed
- President: Josh Babarinde
- Founded: 3 March 1988; 38 years ago
- Merger of: Liberal Party; Social Democratic Party
- Headquarters: Liberal Democrat Headquarters, First Floor, 66 Buckingham Gate, London, SW1E 6AU.
- Youth wing: Young Liberals
- Women's wing: Liberal Democrat Women
- Overseas wing: Lib Dems Abroad
- LGBT wing: LGBT+ Liberal Democrats
- Membership (December 2024): 60,000
- Ideology: Liberalism; Social liberalism; Pro-Europeanism
- Political position: Centre to centre-left
- European affiliation: ALDE Party
- International affiliation: Liberal International
- Northern Irish affiliation: Alliance Party of Northern Ireland
- Colours: Orange (from 2025); Yellow (until 2025)
- Slogan: For a fair deal
- Anthem: "The Land"
- Party conference: Liberal Democrat Conference
- Devolved or semi-autonomous branches: English Liberal Democrats (London); Scottish Liberal Democrats; Welsh Liberal Democrats; Northern Ireland Liberal Democrats
- House of Commons: 71 / 650
- House of Lords: 79 / 796
- Scottish Parliament: 10 / 129
- Senedd: 1 / 96
- London Assembly: 2 / 25
- Strategic authority mayors: 0 / 14
- Directly elected local authority mayors: 1 / 13
- Councillors: 3,366 / 18,645
- Councils led: 76 / 369
- PCCs and PFCCs: 0 / 37

Election symbol

Website
- libdems.org.uk

The Liberal Democrats, colloquially known as the Lib Dems, is a political party in the United Kingdom. Ideologically adhering to liberalism, it was founded in 1988. The party is based at Liberal Democrat Headquarters, which since September 2025 has been located at Buckingham Gate, in the Westminster area of Central London. The party's leader is Ed Davey. It is the third-largest party in the United Kingdom, with 71 members of Parliament (MPs) in the House of Commons. It has 79 members of the House of Lords, 10 in the Scottish Parliament, 1 in the Welsh Senedd, and around 3,200 local council seats. The party holds a twice yearly Liberal Democrat Conference, at which policy is formulated. In contrast to its main opponents, the Lib Dems grant all members attending Conference the right to vote on policy, under a one member, one vote system. As well as voting in the Conference Hall, the party allows its members to vote online for its policies and leadership elections. Members are also free to join organisations representing strands of party thinking, such as Liberal Reform and Social Liberal Forum, and for those under 30 years, Young Liberals.

In 1981, an electoral alliance was established between the Liberal Party, a group which descended from the 18th-century Whigs, and the Social Democratic Party (SDP), a splinter group from the Labour Party. In 1988, the parties merged as the Social and Liberal Democrats, adopting their present name a year later. Under the leaderships of Paddy Ashdown and Charles Kennedy, the party grew in the 1990s and 2000s, focusing its campaigns on specific seats and retained the third-largest party status in the House of Commons, although with significantly more seats than the predecessor Liberal Party. In the 1997 election, the Liberal Democrats doubled their seat count to 46. In 2010, under Nick Clegg's leadership, the Lib Dems were junior partners in the Conservative-led coalition government, in which Clegg served as deputy prime minister. Though it allowed the party to implement some of its policies, the coalition damaged its electoral standing; it lost 48 of its 56 MPs at the 2015 general election, which relegated it to fourth-largest party in the House of Commons. Under the leaderships of Tim Farron, Vince Cable and Jo Swinson, the party refocused as a pro-Europeanist party opposing Brexit. In the 2019 general election, the party garnered 11.5% of the vote on an anti-Brexit platform, but this did not translate into seat gains. However, the party's success was renewed under the leadership of Ed Davey, winning hundreds of councillors and 72 MPs in the 2024 general election, its highest result since 1923, and resuming its status as the third largest party in the House of Commons.

A centrist to centre-left party, the Lib Dems ideologically draw upon liberalism and social democracy. Different factions have dominated the party at different times, each with its own ideological bent. Some factions leaned towards the centre-left, while others were in the centre. The party is a member of the Alliance of Liberals and Democrats for Europe Party (ALDE), and Liberal International. It calls for constitutional reform, including a change from first-past-the-post voting to proportional representation. Emphasising stronger protections for civil liberties, the party promotes social-liberal approaches to issues like LGBT rights, drug liberalisation, education and criminal justice. It favours a market-based economy supplemented with social welfare spending. The party has been described as progressive, and is internationalist and pro-European, and supported the People's Vote for UK membership of the European Union and greater European integration, having previously called for adoption of the euro. The Lib Dems have promoted further environmental protections and opposed British military ventures such as the Iraq War.

The Lib Dems have historically been strongest in northern Scotland, south-west London, South West England, and mid Wales. Membership is primarily made up of middle-class professionals and has a higher proportion of university-educated members than other UK parties. The party is a federation of the English, Scottish, and Welsh Liberal Democrats, and is in a partnership with the Alliance Party of Northern Ireland, while still organising there.

== History ==
=== Origins (1977–1983) ===
The Liberal Party had existed in different forms for over 300 years. During the 19th and early 20th century, it had been one of the United Kingdom's two dominant political parties, along with the Conservative Party. Following World War I, it was pushed into third place by the Labour Party and underwent a gradual decline throughout the rest of the 20th century. In the 1970s, the Liberal leader David Steel began contemplating how an alliance with other parties could return it to political power. In 1977, he formed a pact with Labour Prime Minister James Callaghan to back Callaghan's government in a motion of no confidence. This angered many Liberals and damaged them electorally. In the 1979 general election, the Liberals lost three seats in the House of Commons; the Conservatives, led by Margaret Thatcher, won the election.

Within the Labour Party, many centrists were uncomfortable with the growing influence of the hard left, who were calling for the UK to leave the European Economic Community and unilaterally disarm as a nuclear power. In January 1981, four senior Labour MPs—Bill Rodgers, Shirley Williams, Roy Jenkins, and David Owen, known as the "Gang of Four"—issued the Limehouse Declaration in which they announced their split from Labour. This led to the formal launch of the Social Democratic Party (SDP) in March. One of its first decisions was to negotiate an electoral arrangement with the Liberals, facilitated between Jenkins, who was the first SDP leader, and Steel.

The new alliance initially did well in opinion polls. The SDP and Liberals agreed to contest alternating parliamentary by-elections; between 1981 and 1982, the SDP came close in Warrington and won Crosby and Glasgow Hillhead. At the 1983 general election, the Liberals gained five additional seats although the SDP lost many that they had previously inherited from Labour. After the 1983 election, Owen replaced Jenkins as head of the SDP. Several gains were made in subsequent by-elections: the SDP won in Portsmouth South and Greenwich and the Liberals in Brecon and Radnor and Ryedale.

=== Foundation and early years (1987–1992) ===
The initial logo used by the Social and Liberal Democrats after their 1988 foundation

Both parties lost seats in the 1987 general election. In the wake of this, Steel called for the SDP and Liberals to merge into a single party. At the grassroots, various local constituency groups had already de facto merged. In the SDP, Jenkins, Rodgers, Williams, and the MP Charles Kennedy supported the idea; Owen and the MPs Rosie Barnes and John Cartwright opposed it. The SDP's membership was balloted on the idea: after it produced 57.4% in favour of the merger, Owen resigned as leader, to be replaced by Bob Maclennan. A Liberal conference in September found delegates providing a landslide majority for the merger. Formal negotiations launched that month and in December it produced a draft constitution for the new party. In 1988, Liberal and SDP meetings both produced majorities for the merger; finally, the memberships of both parties were balloted and both produced support for unification. Those in both parties opposed to unification split to form their own breakaway groups, in the form of the Liberal Party and the Continuing SDP.

The Social and Liberal Democrats were formally launched on 3 March 1988. Steel and Maclennan initially became joint interim leaders. At the start, it claimed 19 MPs, 3,500 local councillors, and 100,000 members. In its first leadership election, Paddy Ashdown defeated Alan Beith. Ashdown saw the Liberal Democrats as a radical, reforming force, putting forward policies for introducing home rule for Scotland and Wales, proportional representation, transforming the House of Lords into an elected Senate, and advancing environmental protections. At the September 1988 conference it adopted the short form name "the Democrats" and in October 1989 changed its name to "Liberal Democrats". The bird of liberty was adopted as its logo. In 1989, its election results were poor: it lost 190 seats in the May 1989 local elections and secured only 6.4% of the vote in the 1989 European Parliament elections, beaten to third position by the Green Party. This was the worst election result for an established third party since the 1950s. Its prospects were buoyed after it won the 1990 Eastbourne by-election, followed by-election victories in Ribble Valley and Kincardine and Deeside. In the 1991 local elections it secured a net gain of 520 seats. In the 1992 general election, it secured 17.8% of the vote and 20 seats in the House of Commons: nine of these were in Scotland and five were in Southwest England.

=== Consolidation and growth (1992–1999) ===
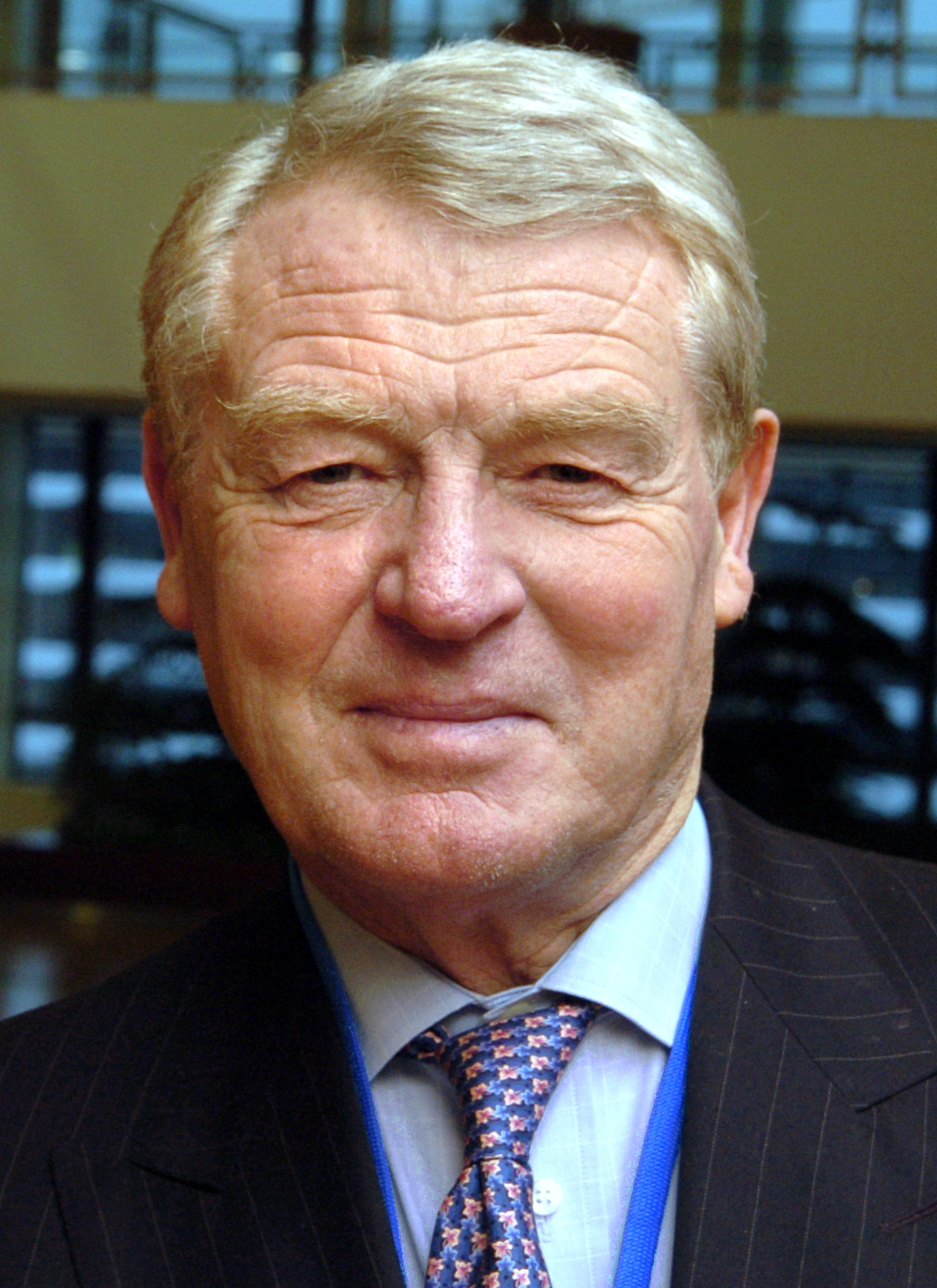
Paddy Ashdown, leader from 1988 to 1999

Between 1992 and 1997, the party underwent a period of consolidation, particularly on local councils. In the 1994 local elections, it came second, pushing the Conservatives into third place. In the 1994 European Parliament elections, it gained two Members of the European Parliament (MEPs). In 1993, the party was damaged by allegations of racism on the Liberal Democrat-controlled council in Tower Hamlets; it faced additional problems as its distinctive centrist niche was threatened by the rise of Tony Blair and New Labour, a project which pushed Labour to the centre. At the 1997 general election, it fielded 639 candidates, securing 46 MPs, the greatest number that the Liberals had had since 1929. These were concentrated in Southwest England, Southwest London, and areas of Scotland. However, the Liberal Democrats attained only 5.2 million votes versus 6 million in 1992.

Although Blair's Labour won a landslide victory in 1997 and did not require a coalition government, Blair was interested in cooperation with the Lib Dems. In July 1997, he invited Ashdown and other senior Lib Dems to join a Cabinet Committee on constitutional affairs. Privately, Blair offered the Liberal Democrats a coalition but later backed down amid fears that it would split his own Cabinet. The joint Committee launched the Independent Commission on the Voting System in December; its report, published in October 1998, proposed the change from the first past the post electoral system to an alternative vote top-up system. This was not the Lib Dems' preferred option—they wanted full proportional representation—although Ashdown hailed it as "a historic step forward". Many Lib Dems were concerned by Ashdown's growing closeness with Labour; aware of this, he stepped down as party leader in 1999. Before he did so, the party took part in the 1999 elections for the Scottish Parliament and the Welsh Assembly. In both, the Lib Dems came fourth and became Labour's junior coalition partners.

=== Charles Kennedy and Menzies Campbell (1999–2007) ===
The MP Simon Hughes was initially seen as Ashdown's most likely successor, but was defeated in the contest by Charles Kennedy. To reduce the impact of more leftist members who tended to dominate at conferences, Kennedy proposed that all members—rather than just conference delegates—should vote for the party's federal executive and federal policy committees. In 2001, Kennedy suspended the Joint Cabinet Committee with Labour. The media characterised him as "Inaction Man" and accused him of lacking a clear identity and political purpose; later criticism also focused on his alcoholism. In the 2001 general election, the party fielded 639 candidates and made a net gain of 6, bringing its total of seats to 52.

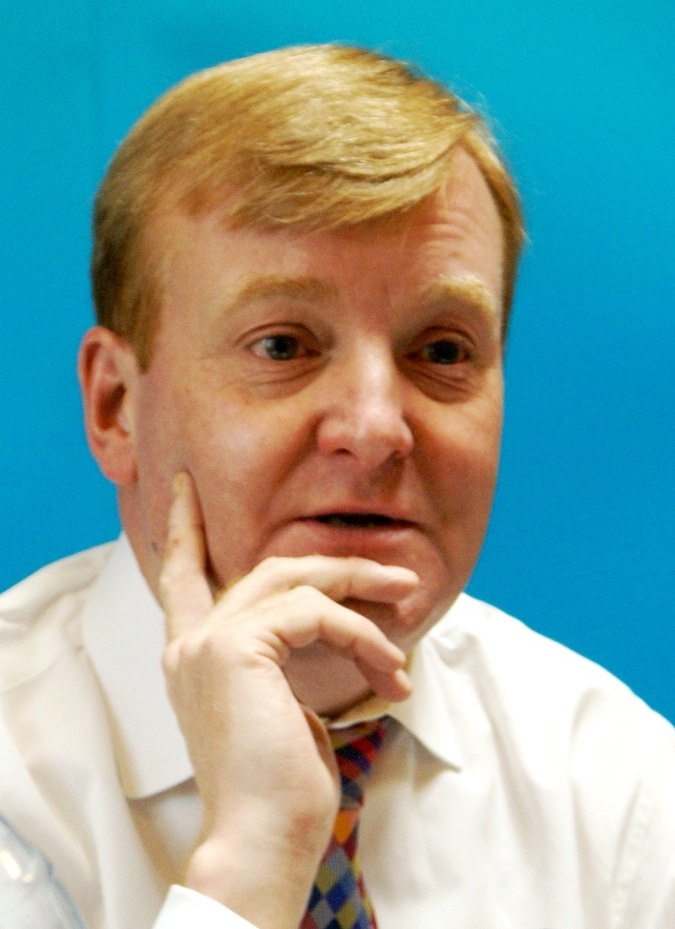
Charles Kennedy, leader from 1999 to 2006

Following the September 11 attacks in the United States and the launch of the U.S.-led war on terror, the Liberal Democrat MPs backed the government's decision to participate in the United States invasion of Afghanistan. The party was more critical of Blair's decision to participate in the U.S.-led invasion of Iraq in 2003; Kennedy joined the large anti-war march in London. With the Conservatives backing the Labour government's decision to go to war, the Lib Dems were the only major party opposing it. In following years, Lib Dem MPs increasingly voted against the Labour government on a range of issues. Much of this Lib Dem opposition to the government came from their members in the House of Lords. In the 2003 local elections, the party secured about 30% of the vote, its highest ever result.

In 2004, The Orange Book anthology was published. Written largely by centre-right economists in the party, it sparked discussions about Liberal Democrat philosophy and brought criticism from the party's social-liberal wing. In the 2005 general election, the Lib Dems secured 62 seats, the most the Liberals had had since 1923. Kennedy however faced growing calls within the party to resign after admitting that he had been treated for alcoholism; in January 2006 he stepped down under pressure even though his admission wasn't damaging to the Lib Dems' public support. In retrospect the move to oust Kennedy was seen as a "graceless" move and a turning point for the Lib Dems, who after 2010 would lose many of the left-leaning voters that Kennedy won over from Labour in 2005, "reeling in disgust from the decision to go into coalition" with the Conservatives (which Kennedy staunchly opposed).

In March 2006, Menzies Campbell succeeded Kennedy as party leader. Campbell was not popular with voters and faced a resurgent Conservative Party under new leader David Cameron; in the May 2007 local elections, the party experienced a net loss of nearly 250 seats. In that year's Scottish Parliament election, the Scottish National Party (SNP) secured the largest vote and the Lib Dem/Labour coalition ended. Campbell was frustrated at the constant media focus on the fact that he was in his late sixties; in October he resigned and Vince Cable became acting leader.

=== Nick Clegg and coalition with the Conservatives (2007–2015) ===
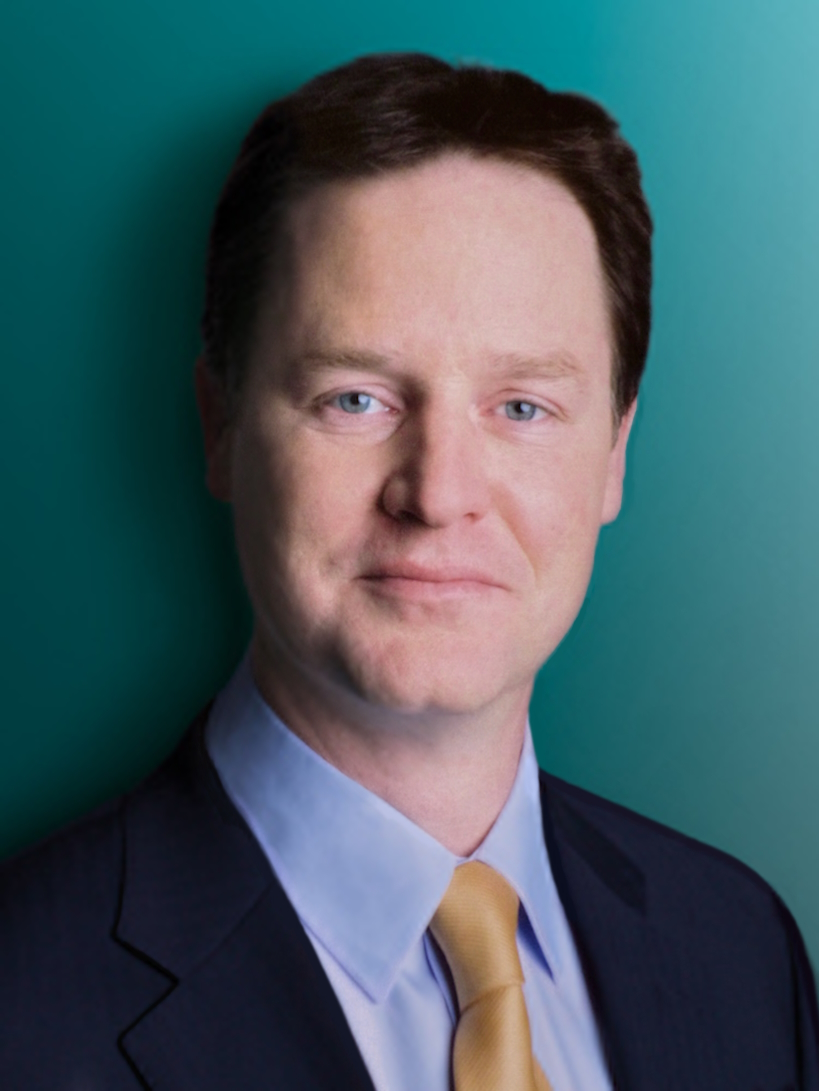
Nick Clegg, leader from 2007 to 2015 and Deputy Prime Minister from 2010 to 2015

In December 2007, Nick Clegg narrowly beat Chris Huhne to take the party's leadership. Clegg's reshuffle of the leadership team was seen by many as a shift to the right; under Clegg, the party moved away from the social democratic focus it displayed previously. It rebranded itself as a party that would cut rather than raise taxes and dropped its hard pro-EU position. In the 2008 local elections it gained 34 seats, beating Labour in terms of vote share. The following year, the party was damaged by the expenses scandal as several Lib Dem MPs and peers were found to have misused their expenses; Campbell for example was revealed to have claimed nearly £10,000 in expenses for luxury home furnishings. In the build-up to the 2010 general election, Clegg took part in the UK's first televised party leaders debate; he was generally considered to have performed well, with pundits referring to an ensuing "Cleggmania".

In the election, the Lib Dems secured 23% of the vote and 57 seats; the Conservatives were the largest party but lacked a majority. The Conservatives and Lib Dems formed a coalition government, with Clegg becoming Deputy Prime Minister. Four other Lib Dems—Cable, Huhne, Danny Alexander, and David Laws—entered the coalition Cabinet. Of the 57 Liberal Democrat MPs, only two refused to support the Conservative Coalition agreement, with former party leader Charles Kennedy and Manchester Withington MP John Leech both rebelling against. Many Lib Dems opposed the move, with some favouring a coalition deal with Labour. As part of the coalition agreement, the Conservatives agreed to Lib Dem demands to introduce elected health boards, put forward a Fixed Term Parliament Bill, and ended income tax for those earning less than £10,000 a year. The Conservatives also agreed to shelve their plans to replace the Human Rights Act 1998 with a proposed British Bill of Rights. The Conservatives refused to agree to Lib Dem demands for a referendum on proportional representation, instead offering a referendum on a switch from first-past-the-post to the Alternative Vote system. The coalition introduced an emergency budget to attack the fiscal deficit.

After joining the coalition poll ratings for the party fell 8% in barely a month particularly following the government's support for raising the cap on tuition fees for "higher education" with Liberal Democrat MPs voting 27 for, 21 against and eight abstaining. The Liberal Democrats had made opposing tuition fees a major message of their campaign, with all of the party's MPs, including Nick Clegg, signing the Vote for Students pledge to oppose any increase in student tuition fees prior to the 2010 general election. In November 2010, The Guardian accessed internal party documents on the subject written prior to the election. These revealed that the party had planned to abandon the tuition fee policy after the election had taken place, as part of any hypothetical coalition agreement with either major party. Clegg later made a formal apology for breaking this promise in September 2012. Shortly after the 2015 general election, Liberal Democrat leadership contender Norman Lamb conceded that Clegg's broken pledge on university tuition had proven costly.

In the May 2011 local elections and the elections for the Welsh Assembly and Scottish Parliament, the Liberal Democrats suffered heavy defeats. Clegg admitted that the party had taken "big knocks" due to a perception that the coalition government had returned to the Thatcherism of the 1980s.

As part of the deal that formed the coalition, it was agreed to hold a referendum on the Alternative Vote, in which the Conservatives would campaign for First Past the Post and the Liberal Democrats for Alternative Vote. The referendum, held on 5 May 2011, resulted in First Past the Post being chosen over Alternative Vote by approximately two-thirds of voters. In May 2011, Clegg revealed plans to make the House of Lords a mainly elected chamber, limiting the number of peers to 300, 80% of whom would be elected with a third of that 80% being elected every five years by single transferable vote. In August 2012, Clegg announced that attempts to reform the House of Lords would be abandoned due to opposition for the proposals by backbench Conservative MPs. Claiming the coalition agreement had been broken, Clegg stated that Liberal Democrat MPs would no longer support changes to the House of Commons boundaries for the 2015 general election. The Lib Dem Secretary of State for Energy and Climate Change Chris Huhne in 2011 announced plans for halving UK carbon emissions by 2025 as part of the "Green Deal" which was in the 2010 Liberal Democrat manifesto.

The Lib Dems lost over 300 councillors in the 2012 local elections, leaving them with fewer than 3,000 for the first time in the party's history. In June 2012, it was reported that membership of the party had fallen by around 20% since joining the coalition.

In February 2013, the party won a by-election in Eastleigh, the Hampshire constituency that had previously been held by the former minister, Chris Huhne. The party's candidate, Mike Thornton, had been a local councillor for the party, and held the seat. In eighteen other by-elections held throughout the 2010 to 2015 Parliament, the party lost its deposit in 11; in the Rochester and Strood by-election held on 20 November 2014, it came fifth polling 349 votes or 0.9% of the total votes cast, the worst result in the history of the party.

In the 2013 local elections, the Liberal Democrats lost over 100 council seats. In the 2014 local elections, they lost another 307 council seats and ten of their eleven seats in the European Parliament in the 2014 European elections.

In the 2015 general election, the party lost 48 seats in the House of Commons, leaving them with only eight MPs. Prominent Liberal Democrat MPs who lost their seats included former leader Charles Kennedy, former deputy leaders Vince Cable and Simon Hughes, and several cabinet ministers. The Conservatives won an outright majority. Clegg then announced his resignation as party leader. The party lost over 400 council seats in the 2015 local elections, held the same day.

=== Collapse and opposing Brexit (2015–2019) ===
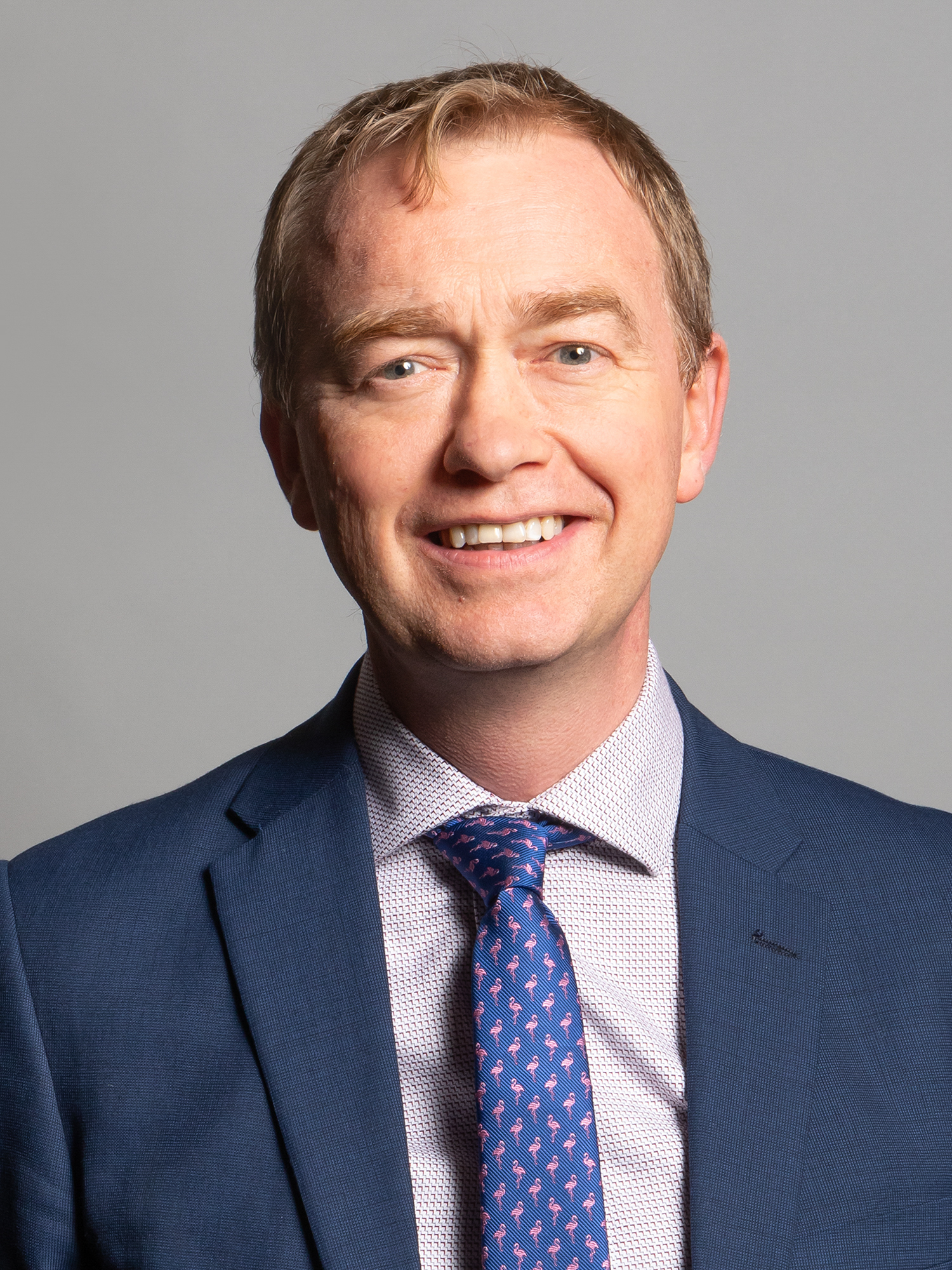
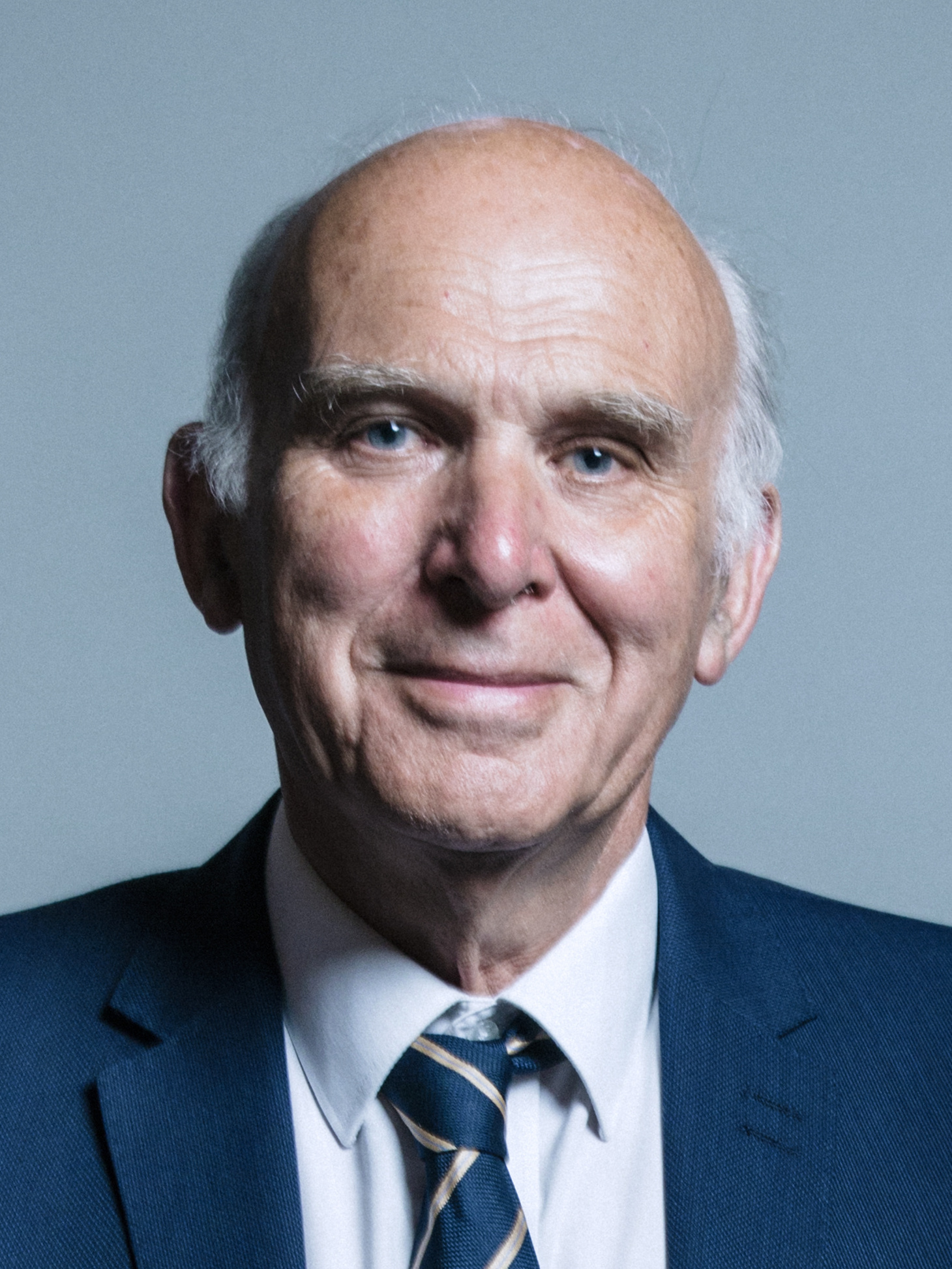
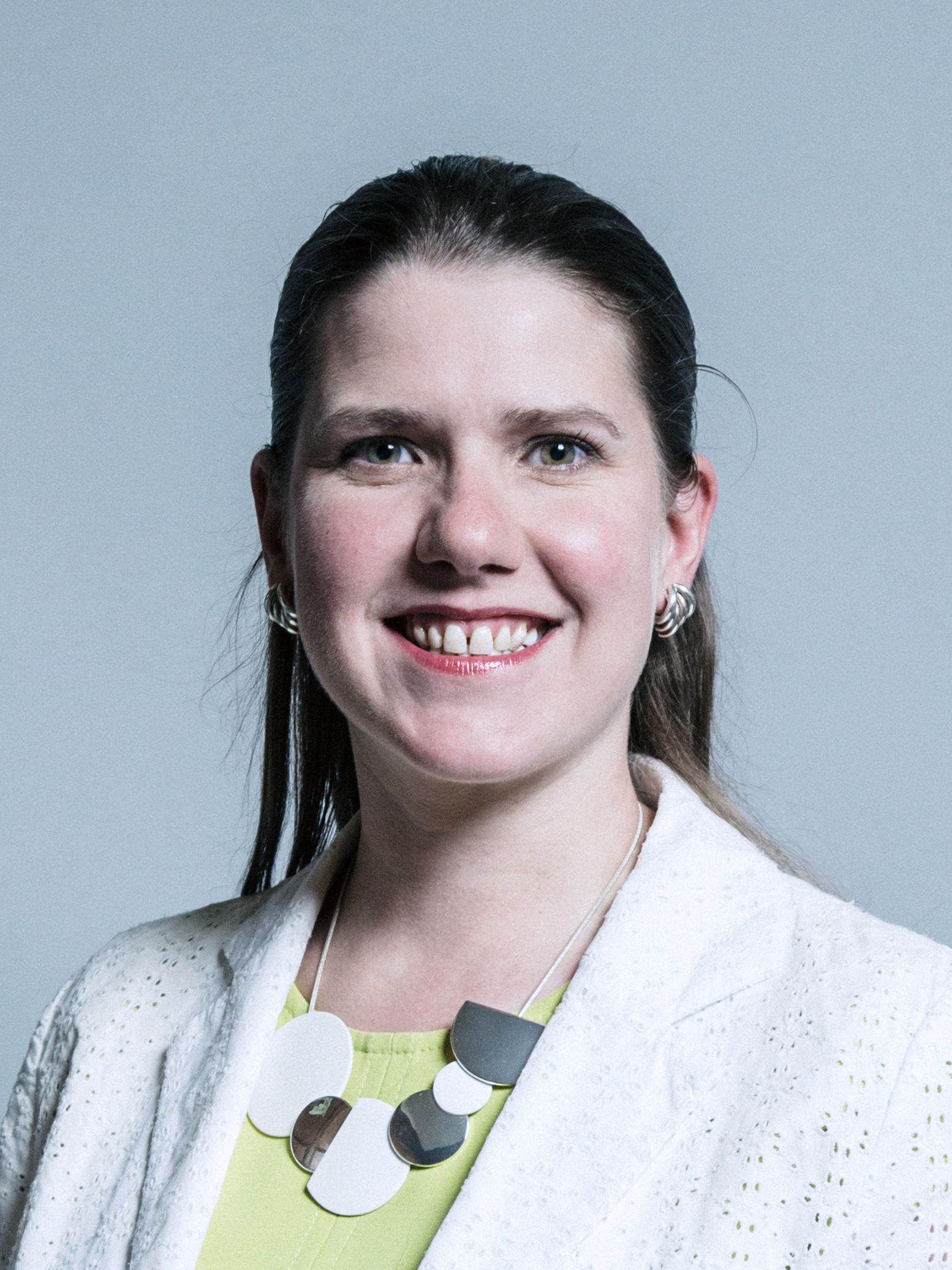
Following the coalition government, the Lib Dems were led by Tim Farron (2015–2017), Vince Cable (2017–2019) and Jo Swinson (2019)

Membership of the Liberal Democrats rose from 45,000 to 61,000 as the party prepared to hold its 2015 party leadership ballot. On 16 July 2015, Tim Farron was elected to the leadership of the party with 56.5% of the vote, beating opponent Norman Lamb. In the May 2016 local elections, the Liberal Democrats gained a small number of council seats, though they lost ground in the Welsh Assembly. The party campaigned for a Remain vote in the referendum on United Kingdom membership of the European Union in June 2016. Following the Leave vote, the Liberal Democrats sought to mobilise the 48% who voted Remain, and the party's membership rose again, reaching 80,000 by September.

The 2017 local election results saw a loss of about 40 council seats. In the 2017 general election, during which the party advocated continued membership of the European single market and a referendum on the Brexit withdrawal agreement, the Liberal Democrats' vote share dropped 0.5% to 7.4%, its lowest percentage ever, but produced a net gain of four seats. Farron then resigned; in July 2017 Vince Cable was elected leader unopposed. He called for a second referendum on the UK's relationship with the European Union. In December 2018, the MP for Eastbourne, Stephen Lloyd, resigned the Liberal Democrat Whip, saying that his party's position on Brexit was inconsistent with his pledge to his constituency that he would "respect the result" of the 2016 United Kingdom European Union membership referendum. Although Lloyd remained a Liberal Democrat member, this took the number of sitting Liberal Democrat MPs down to 11.

The party gained 76 councillors in the 2018 local elections and 704 councillors in the 2019 local elections. In the 2019 European Parliament election the party ran with an anti-Brexit message seeking the support of those who wish the UK to remain in the EU, using the slogan "Bollocks to Brexit" which attracted considerable media attention. In that election, the party gained 20% of the popular vote and returned 16 MEPs. In May, Cable stood down as leader, triggering a leadership election.

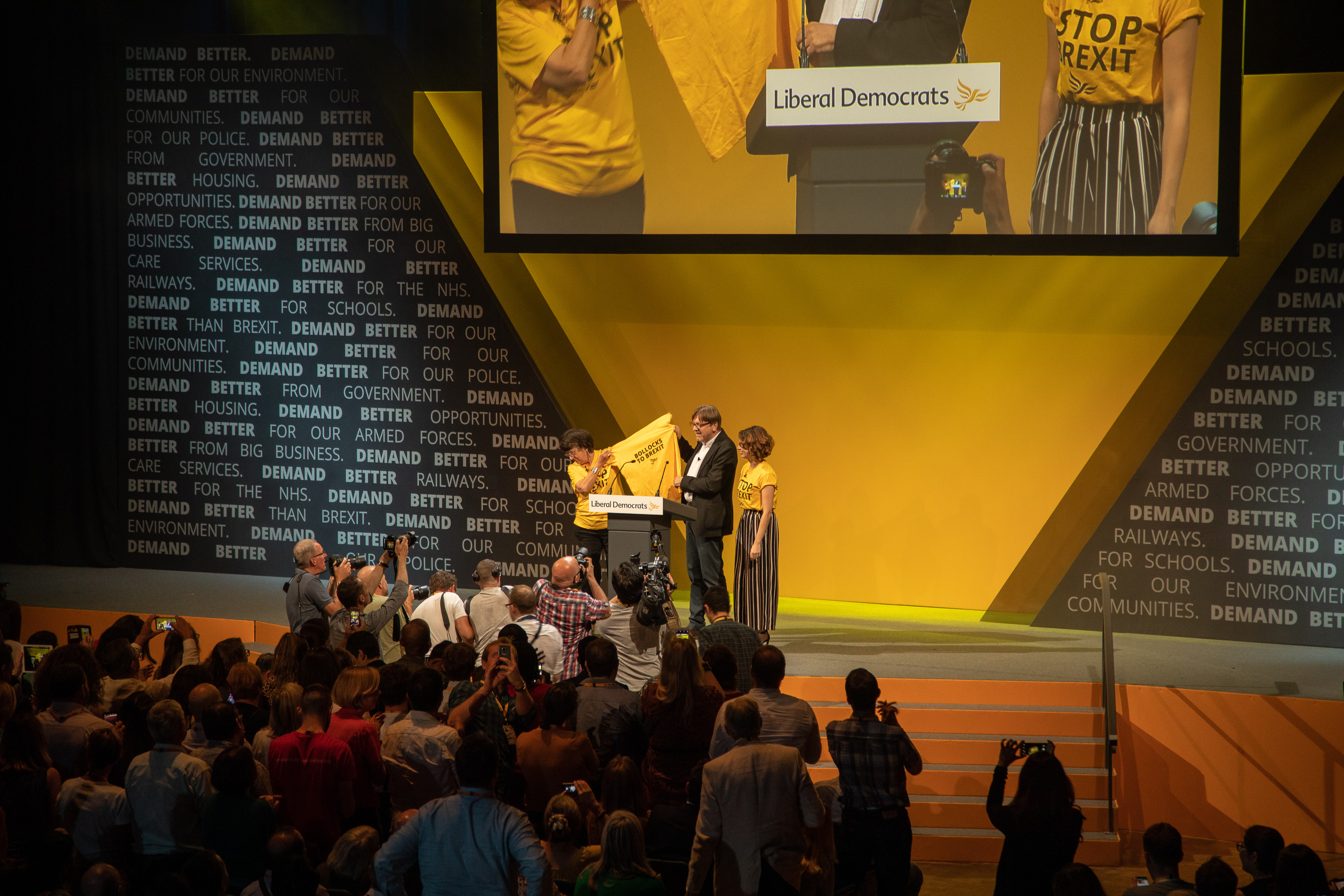
Guy Verhofstadt, the European parliament's Brexit co-ordinator, at the 2019 Liberal Democrats conference

Between June and October 2019, the total number of MPs rose from 11 to 21, following eight defections from other parties, one by-election win, and Lloyd retaking the whip. The defections were mainly former MPs of Change UK, with Chuka Umunna and Sarah Wollaston joining directly from the party, whereas Heidi Allen, Luciana Berger, and Angela Smith joined after subsequently being part of The Independents. The remaining defectors were three of the 21 rebel Conservative MPs who had the whip withdrawn for voting against the government on a piece of legislation which would prevent a no-deal scenario on 31 October 2019: Antoinette Sandbach, Sam Gyimah, and Phillip Lee. The latter physically crossed the floor during the debate on the legislation, effectively removing the majority of the first Johnson government.

Heading into the 2019 general election, the party polled well, with one poll showing the party with 20% (within 4% of Labour) as late as 28 October. Nonetheless, during the campaign period the party's fortunes dwindled, and leader Jo Swinson received negative reviews. In the election, the Liberal Democrats lost ten seats from the previous parliament and one from the previous election, returning 11 MPs. Of the nine new MPs who joined between June and October 2019, the eight who contested their seats in the 2019 general election all lost their seats. However, the party did gain 4.2% in the vote, rising to 11.6%. Swinson herself narrowly lost her East Dunbartonshire constituency to the Scottish National Party's Amy Callaghan, forcing her to resign as leader the next day in accordance with the Liberal Democrat Constitution which mandates that the leader must also serve as an MP. Deputy Leader Ed Davey and Party President Sal Brinton then jointly assumed the positions of acting co-leaders of the party. Brinton was at the end of the year (31 December 2019) replaced by Mark Pack as Party President and acting co-leader while Mike Dixon remains the party CEO.

=== Revival under Ed Davey (2020–present) ===
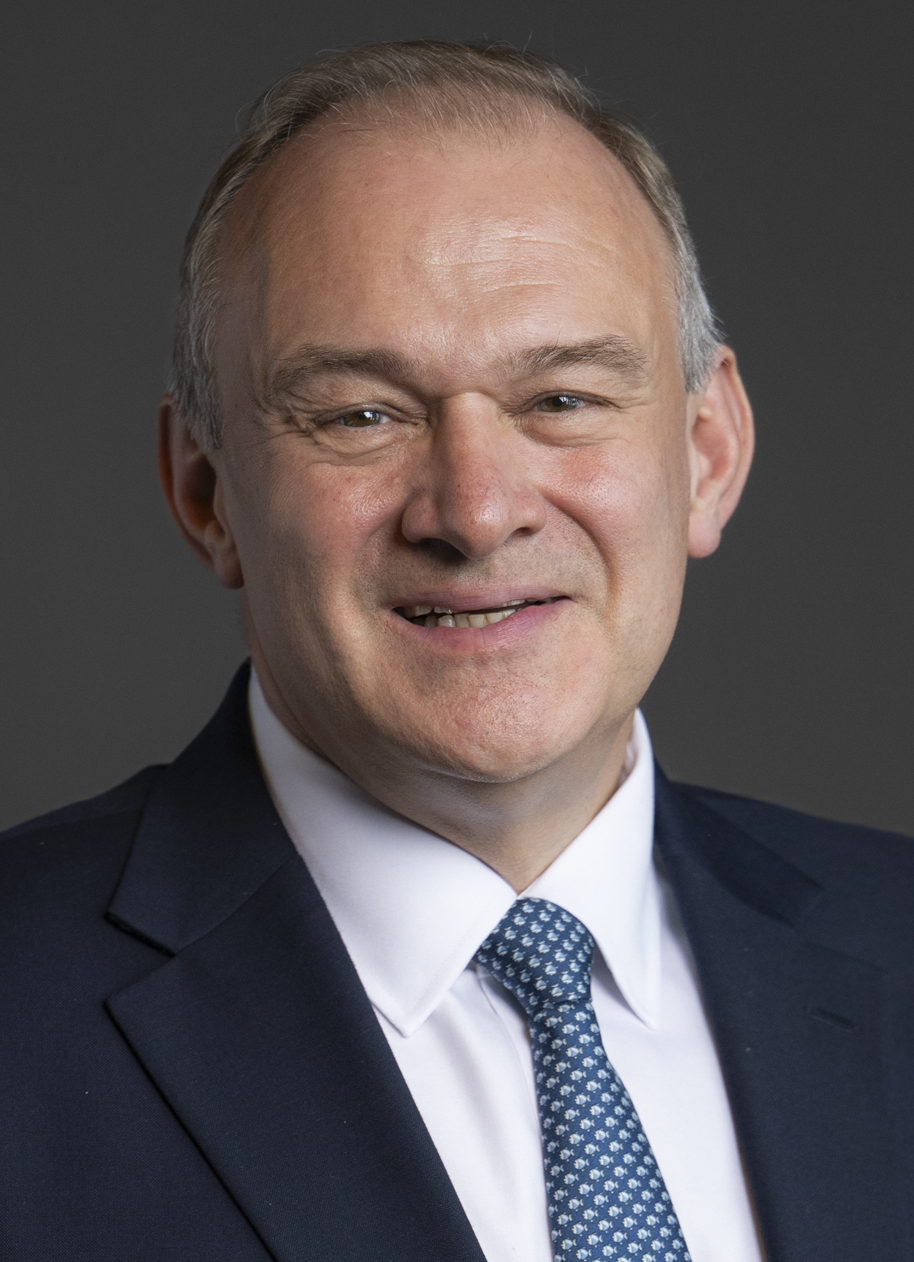
Ed Davey, current leader

The Liberal Democrats' federal board set out a timetable in January 2020 which stated that a new party leader would be elected in July 2020. Due to the outbreak of COVID-19 in the United Kingdom in the late winter and spring which saw many politicians infected, the party's board initially pushed the leadership election back to May 2021. The decision was reversed in May 2020 to hold the leadership election in July 2020. On 27 August 2020, Ed Davey was elected as leader of the party, by a margin of almost 18,000 votes. On 13 September 2020, Daisy Cooper was announced as the party's new Deputy Leader.

In September 2020, it was revealed by the party's new campaigning chief that the Liberal Democrats had started planning a four-year drive to woo "soft conservatives". Cooper said the party could find a route forward by appealing to voters that had always thought of themselves as conservatives but who opposed the current direction of the Conservative Party under Boris Johnson.

When Davey was asked by Andrew Marr about the party's stance on rejoining the EU, he said "We are not a rejoin party, but we are a very pro-European party." This caused anger to some Liberal Democrat members and a few days after Davey wrote a blog post clarifying his position. He stressed the Liberal Democrats were "committed to the UK being members of the European Union again" and insisted that members may have "misinterpreted" what he said on The Andrew Marr Show and that once he was able to clarify "people were completely relaxed".

Under Davey, the Liberal Democrats seized the traditional Conservative constituency of Chesham and Amersham in a by-election in which Sarah Green overturned a 16,000 majority in June 2021 and then repeated a similar feat in North Shropshire in December 2021 when Helen Morgan overturned a 23,000 majority. In the 2022 local elections, the Liberal Democrats gained councillors in all countries of Great Britain, with the largest gain of any party in England with 194 new councillors. One month later, the Liberal Democrats contested and won the Tiverton and Honiton by-election with its candidate Richard Foord, overturning a majority of over 24,000 and breaking the record for the biggest overturning of a majority in British by-election history.

The Liberal Democrats saw considerable gains in the 2023 local elections, gaining 405 councillors and winning control of 12 more councils. They also overturned a 19,000 Conservative majority in the 2023 Somerton and Frome by-election to elect Sarah Dyke as their 15th MP.

In the 2024 local elections, Davey said he was confident of toppling the "Tory Blue Wall in Surrey". The Lib Dems finished in second place behind Labour and ahead of the Conservatives in terms of seats. The Liberal Democrats gained Tunbridge Wells council and Dorset Council. They notably added more council seats than any other party over the last parliament, gaining more than 750 in the last five years, largely in southern England.

The Liberal Democrats entered the 2024 general election with its manifesto policies including reforming Carer's Allowance, free personal care in England, votes at 16 and proportional representation. After a successful campaign, the party made the biggest gain in seats in its history, winning a party high of 72 seats.

In the 2025 local elections, the Liberal Democrats came second place behind Reform UK. They won three county councils; Cambridgeshire, Oxfordshire and Shropshire.

== Ideology ==
The Liberal Democrats have an ideology that draws on both the liberal and social democratic traditions. The party is primarily social liberal, supporting redistribution but sceptical of increasing the power of the state, emphasising the link between equality and liberty. The party supports investment and progressive taxation, but also promotes civil liberties and a less centralised economy. This distinguishes the party from many liberal parties elsewhere in Europe that are instead dominated by classical liberalism. By comparison, the Liberal Democrats support a mixed economy and have sometimes opposed privatisation.

The party spans the centre and centre-left, sometimes considered left-wing due to its stance on social progressivism and opposition to right-wing parties and opinions, and has emphasised each aspect at different times. The public have traditionally viewed the party as centre-left, though during the Cameron–Clegg coalition they were seen as centrist. On economic issues, the party has usually been positioned between the Conservatives and the Labour Party, though typically closer to the Labour Party. There is a degree of ideological diversity among members of the Liberal Democrats, with a wide range of opinions on most subjects.

Leonard Hobhouse is a key ideological influence on the Liberal Democrats, and there is substantial overlap between the party's platform and the form of social democracy advocated by Anthony Crosland in The Future of Socialism. The party's egalitarianism is based on the concept of equality of opportunity. The party has been sceptical of positive discrimination, including in its process for selecting political candidates. The party has frequently debated the introduction of all-women shortlists in selection, but not implemented them.

The Liberal Democrats support a range of constitutional reforms, including by advocating a decentralised federal structure for the United Kingdom, including devolving power to the regions of England. The party supported devolution to Scotland and Wales enacted by the Labour government under Tony Blair. The party has consistently supported electoral reform to produce more proportional results. On social issues, the party is liberal and progressive. It has consistently supported LGBT rights and drug reform. The party is internationalist and pro-European. They have consistently supported policies of European integration, including long-term advocacy of the United Kingdom adopting the euro, though they have opposed the establishing of a European army. Both before and after the 2016 United Kingdom European Union membership referendum, the party has advocated for the United Kingdom's continued membership of the European Union. The party supports liberal interventionism, and supported the war in Afghanistan, later opposing the 2003 invasion of Iraq due to its lack of support from the United Nations. The party has also faced internal division over the issue of nuclear weapons.

The party has a number of factions representing different strains of liberal thought. Although the social liberals, represented by the Social Liberal Forum (often abbreviated to the SLF), are the majority, factions that advocate for more economically liberal positions include Liberal Reform (often abbreviated to LR) and the "Orange Bookers", named after The Orange Book: Reclaiming Liberalism; The Orange Book is most often associated with former deputy prime minister Nick Clegg, who contributed to it, along with former Liberal Democrat leader Vince Cable and incumbent leader Ed Davey. Additionally, there is the centre-left Beveridge Group, inspired by William Beveridge. The Beveridge Group has been associated with both social liberals and social democrats within the party, including former Liberal Democrat leader Charles Kennedy.

== Policy platform ==
=== Constitutional reform ===
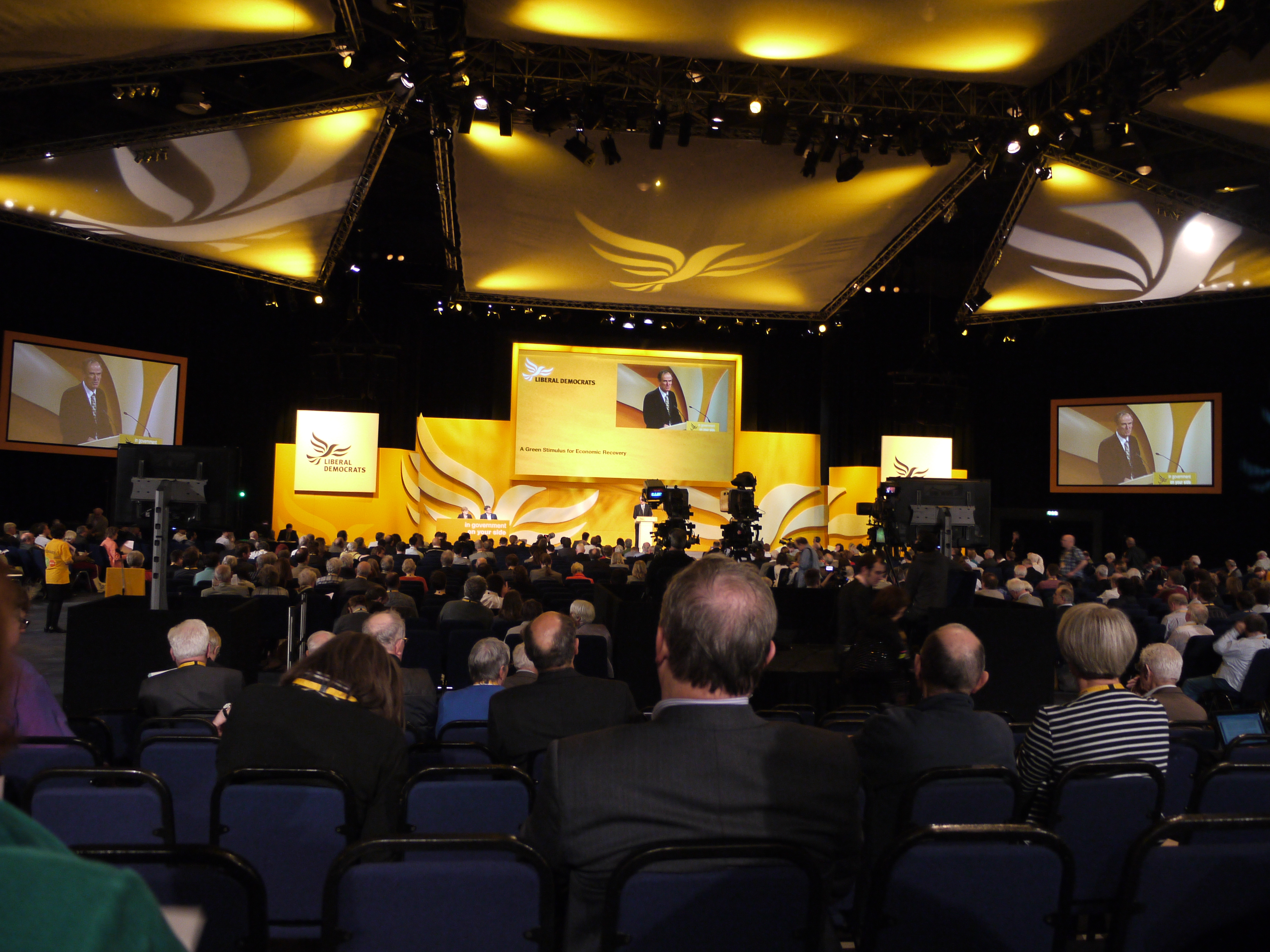
The 2011 Liberal Democrats conference

The Liberal Democrats support institutional reform in the United Kingdom, including the decentralisation of state power, reform of Parliament, and electoral reform. At its 1993 conference, the party put forward plans for the introduction of fixed term parliaments, something it later secured in the coalition government of 2010 to 2015. Also in 1993, it proposed state funding for political parties. The Liberal Democrats have long included a commitment to proportional representation in their manifestos. According to the New Statesman, this is the "one policy with which the Liberal Democrats are identified in the minds of the public." The Lib Dems calls for devolution or home rule for Scotland and Wales were enacted by Blair's Labour government in the late 1990s. The 1993 conference also called for the introduction of a bill of rights into the British constitution. Its 2001 and 2024 manifestos have included a commitment to lowering the voting age from 18 to 16. The Liberal Democrats also stated in their 2024 manifesto that they support scrapping voter ID. In 2013, an internal pressure group in the party called Liberal Democrats for a republic was formed.

According to a 1999 survey, two-thirds of party members supported retaining the monarchy. In the 1990s, there was an anti-royalist contingent within the party; in 1993, the party conference announced support for removing the royal prerogative, and the 2000 conference backed calls for the monarch to be removed as the Supreme Governor of the Church of England. At its 2003 conference, the party's Youth and Student League put forward a motion calling for the abolition of the monarchy and the introduction of an elected head of state. The 2000 party conference produced a call for the 1701 Act of Settlement to be reformed so as to allow the heir to the throne to marry a Roman Catholic, while the party's 2001 manifesto called for the disestablishment of the Church of England. The party's endorsement of secularism dates back to 1990, with standing policy favouring total separation of church and state.

=== Economic and social welfare policy ===
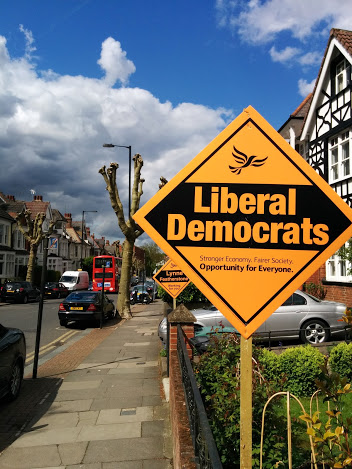
Liberal Democrats campaigning stakeboards in Hornsey and Wood Green in 2015

The 1999 membership survey found that most favoured free markets and individual responsibility; they were nevertheless split on whether or not they regarded private enterprise as the best way to solve economic problems. Most were against either further privatisation or further nationalisation, although they were overwhelmingly favourable to increasing taxation and government spending. The membership was also heavily against additional restrictions on trade unions.

Liberal Democrat policy has generally been favourable to social welfare spending. During the 2000s, the party made pledges for major investment into health, education, and public services. In 1995, the party announced a plan to put £2 billion into education, including nursery places for under fives, while its 2005 manifesto included a commitment to use £1.5 billion to decrease class sizes in schools. In the 2000s, the party also pledged to abolish tuition fees for university students, and in the build-up to the 2010 general election, Clegg pledged that under a Lib Dem government this would be achieved over six years. In 2004, it pledged to add £25 a week to the state pension for people over the age of 75. In 2003, it outlined plans for devolving control of schools to local councils.

In the mid-1990s and early 2000s, it stated that such increases in education spending would be funded through higher taxes. These included a 50% tax on those earning over £100,000 a year, and raising the basic rate of income tax by one penny in the pound. In 2003, the party's conference approved plans for a local income tax of 3.5 pence in the pound that would replace council tax; the party believed that this would result in 70% of the population paying less tax. In 2006, the party abandoned its plans for a 50% tax on the highest earners, and also put forward plans to cut income tax but balance the books by increasing tax on air travel and introducing a carbon tax.

Under Clegg, the party emphasised lowering taxes rather than raising them; it stated that a 4 pence reduction in the basic rate tax could be permitted by finding £20 billion savings in Whitehall. This measure was opposed by the left of the party. Amid the 2008 recession, Clegg called for £20 billion cuts to state spending, to be funded by measures like reducing the number of people eligible for tax credits and scrapping road building schemes. In its 2010 manifesto, it pledged to end income taxes for those earning under £10,000 a year, something it introduced through the Cameron coalition government. Also in 2010, it stated that it would halve the national deficit over the course of four years. It had also specified that it would oppose any increases in VAT, although when in coalition announced an increase in VAT to 20%.

The party's 2024 manifesto stated that it would reduce the wait for the first payment of Universal Credit from five weeks to five days.

=== Foreign policy and the European Union ===
The Liberal Democrats supported the war in Afghanistan in 2001. The party was the only one of Britain's three major parties to oppose the 2003 invasion of Iraq. The party's leadership stressed that this was not because the party was intrinsically anti-war, but because the invasion did not have support from the United Nations. In the wake of the invasion, the party's 2005 manifesto included a pledge that the UK would never again support a military occupation deemed illegal under international law. Menzies Campbell demanded the suspension of all future arms exports to Israel during the 2006 Lebanon War and Operation Summer Rains. Ed Davey and the Liberal Democrats have supported a ceasefire in the Gaza war since 13 November 2023.

The Liberal Democrats called for a full judicial inquiry into Britain's involvement in CIA black sites and extraordinary rendition since the 11 September attacks. They also called on the UK government to suspend arms sales to Saudi Arabia and condemned the Saudi-led coalition's attacks targeting civilians in Yemen. In February 2019, the International Court of Justice in The Hague issued an advisory opinion stating that the UK must transfer the Chagos Archipelago to Mauritius as they were not legally separated from the latter in 1965. Liberal Democrat foreign affairs spokesperson Alistair Carmichael stated: "The ICJ has very clearly instructed the UK to return the island chain to Mauritian control. The government's refusal to do so is arrogant and jeopardises our credibility on a world stage."

Whiteley et al. noted that "like the Liberals before them, [the Liberal Democrats] have taken a strong positive position on internationalism", including the need for international cooperation, aid for the developing world, and European integration. In this they have always been more internationalist and pro-Europeanist than either Labour or the Conservatives.

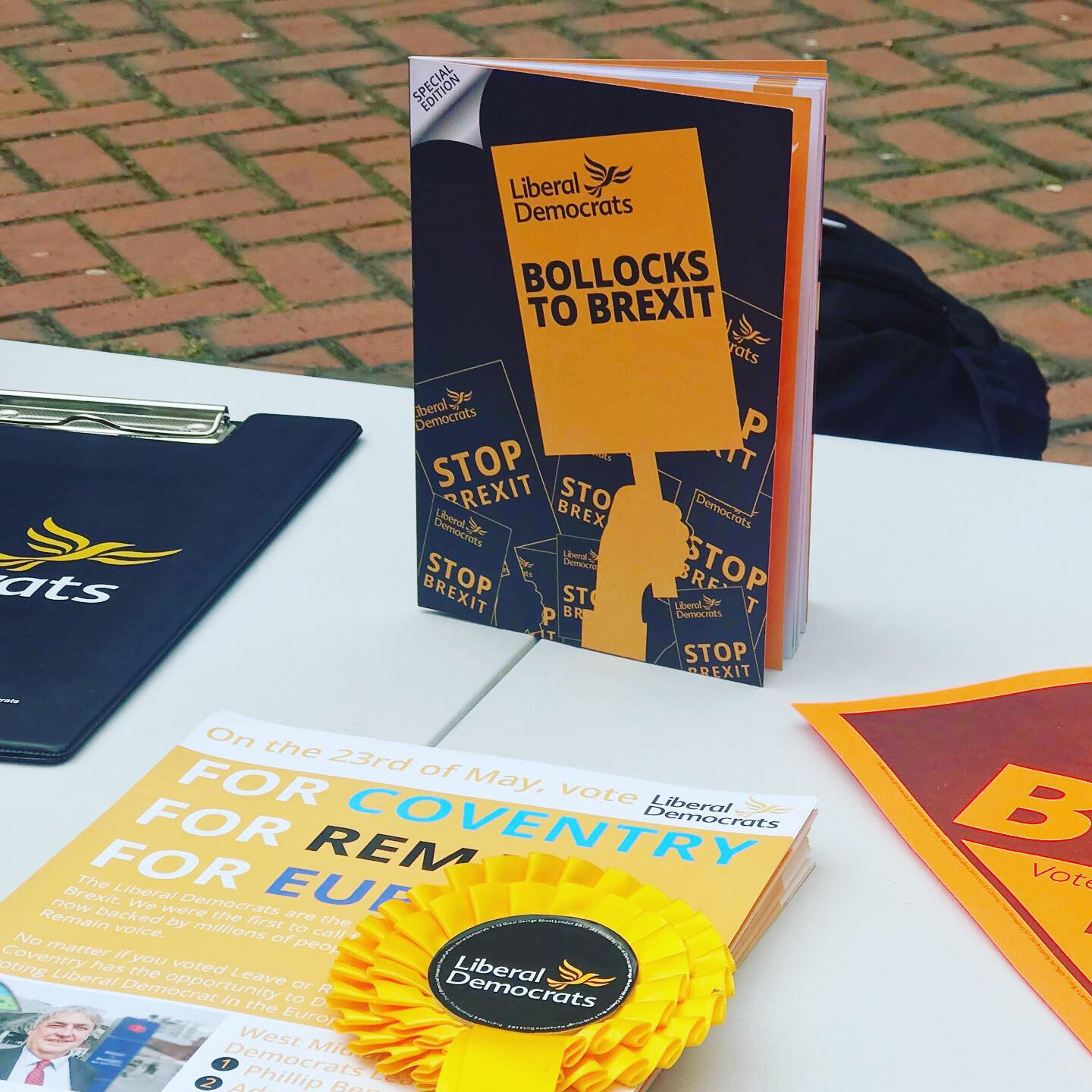
Following the 2016 referendum which produced a majority in favour of Brexit, the Lib Dems campaigned against the decision with its somewhat controversial "Bollocks to Brexit" campaign

From its foundation, the Liberal Democrats were committed to the UK's membership of the European Union. In 1993, it called for the UK to take a lead in seeking a timetable for the adoption of a pan-European currency, and also called for the formation of an autonomous European central bank. A 1999 survey of party members found they overwhelmingly backed European integration, and two thirds wanted the UK to adopt the euro currency. In its 1999 manifesto for the European Parliamentary elections, it called for completing the European single market, holding a referendum on the adoption of the euro currency, establishing an EU constitution, expanding the EU into Central and Eastern Europe, and encouraging an EU-wide clampdown on pollution and international crime. This attitude had been inherited from the Liberal Party which had originally proposing membership into the predecessor European Coal and Steel Community. However, the Liberal Democrats oppose the European federalism espoused by their counterparts.

Despite its pro-European stance, the party has included Eurosceptics such as the MP Nick Harvey. The 1999 membership survey found that 37% wanted the UK to remain in the EU but to have the latter's powers reduced while 5% of members wanted the UK to leave the EU altogether. Cook argued that whereas the Lib Dems were once "the most pro-European of all British parties", by 2008, it had "a vocal Eurosceptic element" who were opposed to the British ratification of the EU's Lisbon Treaty without a referendum. Under Clegg, the party backed away from its hardline pro-EU position.

In June 2016, following the United Kingdom European Union membership referendum in which 51.9% voted in favour of leaving the European Union, Tim Farron said that if Liberal Democrats were to be elected in the next parliamentary election, they would not follow through with triggering Article 50 of the Treaty on European Union and leaving the EU ("Any Member State may decide to withdraw from the Union in accordance with its own constitutional requirements") but would instead keep UK part of the EU. Following this promise, the Liberal Democrats claim that their membership has increased by 10,000 since the referendum; at one point, the growth in the party was the equivalent of one person joining per minute. Campaigning for a second referendum regarding the exact goals of Brexit negotiation was one of the party's flagship policies in the 2017 general election and the 2019 general election.

=== Environmentalism ===
The Liberal Democrats have strongly advocated for environmental protection and have typically taken more radical stances on environmental issues than either Labour or the Conservatives. One of the Party's affiliated organisations, the Green Liberal Democrats (GLD), lays claim to being the "Environmental Conscience" of the party and was formed in 1988 at the same time as the Liberal Party merged with the SDP to become the Liberal Democrats. GLD itself was a merger between the small SDP Green group and the Liberal Ecology Group (LEG) which was formed in 1977. In 1993, the party put forward proposals for an EU tax on energy use and CO_{2} emissions. That year, it also proposed that GDP should be redefined to take into account pollution and the depletion of natural resources. At its 2009 conference, the party introduced a commitment for Lib Dem controlled councils to cut their carbon emissions by 10% in 2010. Other policies included:

- Designate an ecologically coherent network of marine protected areas with appropriate management by 2020.
- Encourage the uptake of water metering, including introducing metering in all defined water-stressed areas by 2025, coupled with the development of national social tariffs to protect low income households.
- Complete the coastal path, introduce a fuller Right to Roam and a new designation of National Nature Parks to protect up to a million acres of accessible green space valued by local communities.

The Liberal Democrats' 2024 general election manifesto contained significant references to climate change and the restoration of nature, in addition to the impact of sewage spills on the local environment. The Royal Society for the Protection of Birds and the Campaign to Protect Rural England both broadly praised the environment sections of the manifesto but identified areas of disagreement. According to the GLD, twenty-five of the seventy-two Liberal Democrat MPs elected in 2024 are members of the group.

=== Human rights and individual liberty ===
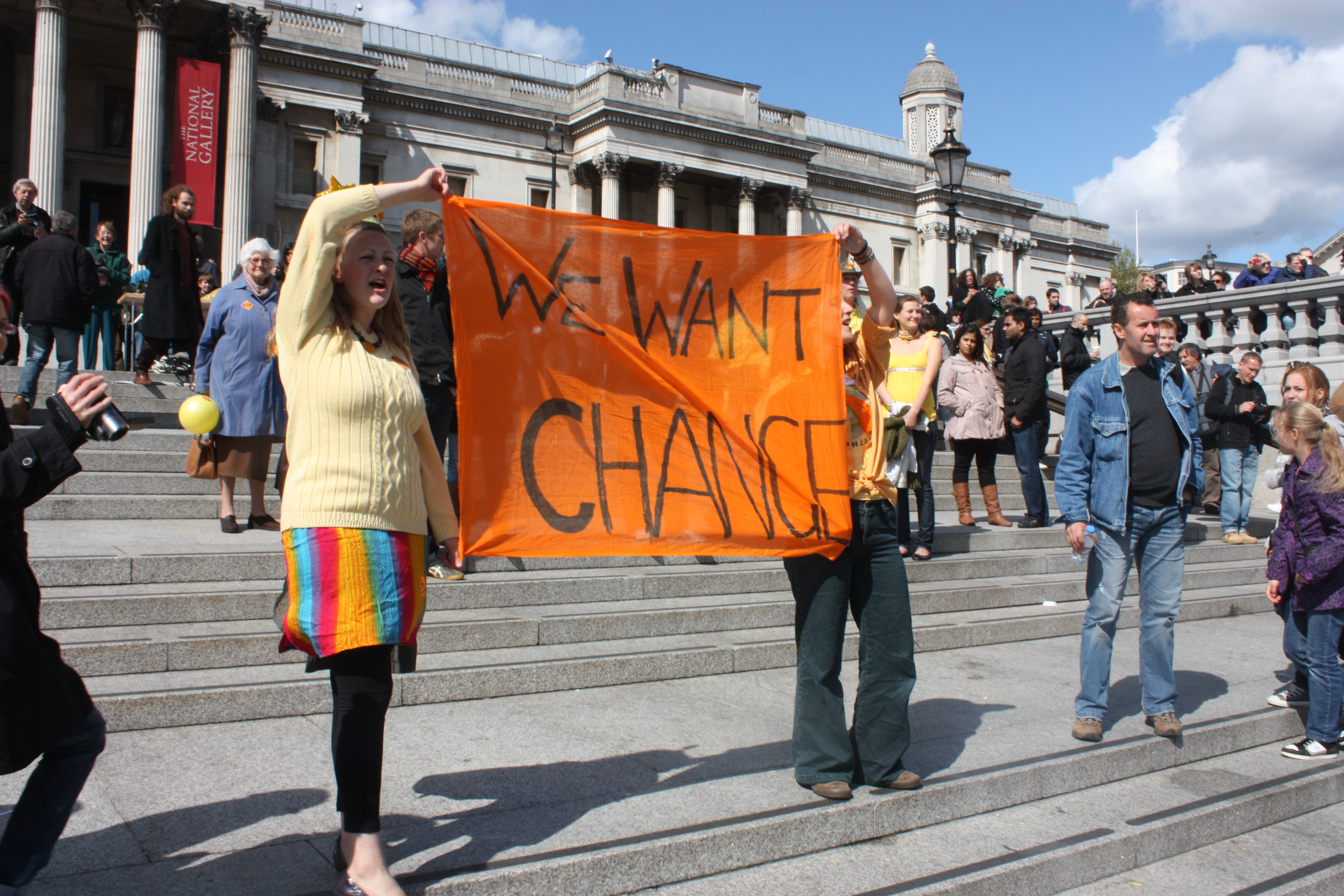
Members of a Lib Dems flash mob in London's Trafalgar Square in the build-up to the 2010 general election

The Liberal Democrats place greater emphasis on human rights and individual freedoms than the Conservatives or Labour. Conversely, the political scientist John Meadowcroft expressed the view that "the Liberal Democrats are a supposedly liberal party that does not believe in liberty." Commenting on the 1999 membership survey, Whiteley et al. noted that the majority of members took "a distinctly right of centre view" on many, although not all, moral and legal issues.

Its 1997 manifesto committed the party to lowering the age of consent for same-sex couples to 16, bringing it in line with that of opposite-sex couples. At its 2000 conference, party delegates backed calls for the government to provide legal recognition for same-sex relationships. In the 1999 membership survey, 57% believed that the government should discourage the growth of one-parent families. That same survey found just over half of the party membership expressing pro-choice views regarding abortion access.

At its 1997 conference, the party's delegates voted in favour of establishing a Royal Commission to examine the possibility of decriminalising voluntary euthanasia.

At its 1994 conference, party delegates voted to end criminal prosecutions for cannabis possession, although the party's 23 MPs voted against the measure. The 1999 membership survey suggested a tougher stance on many law and order issues, with over half wanting longer sentencing and no option of parole for those serving life sentences. The 2004 party congress approved a ban on smoking in public places.

In March 2016, the Liberal Democrats became the first major political party in the UK to support the legalisation of cannabis. The party supports cannabis sale and possession to be legal for all UK adults aged 18-years-old and over, the set up of specialist licensed stores to sell cannabis, the legalisation of home cultivation of cannabis for personal use, small scale cannabis clubs to be licensed, and a new regulator to oversee the market. In the Liberal Democrats 2024 manifesto it stated that it would ban conversion therapy.

== Organisation and structure ==
The Liberal Democrats are a federal party of the parties of England, Scotland, and Wales. The English and Scottish parties are further split into regions. The parliamentary parties of the House of Commons, the House of Lords, the Scottish Parliament and the Senedd form semi-autonomous units within the party. The leaders in the House of Commons and the Scottish Parliament are the leaders of the federal party and the Scottish Party; the leaders in the other two chambers, and the officers of all parliamentary parties, are elected from their own number. Co-ordination of all party activities across all federated groups is undertaken through the Federal Board. Chaired by the party president, its 30+ members includes representatives from each of the groups and democratically elected representatives.

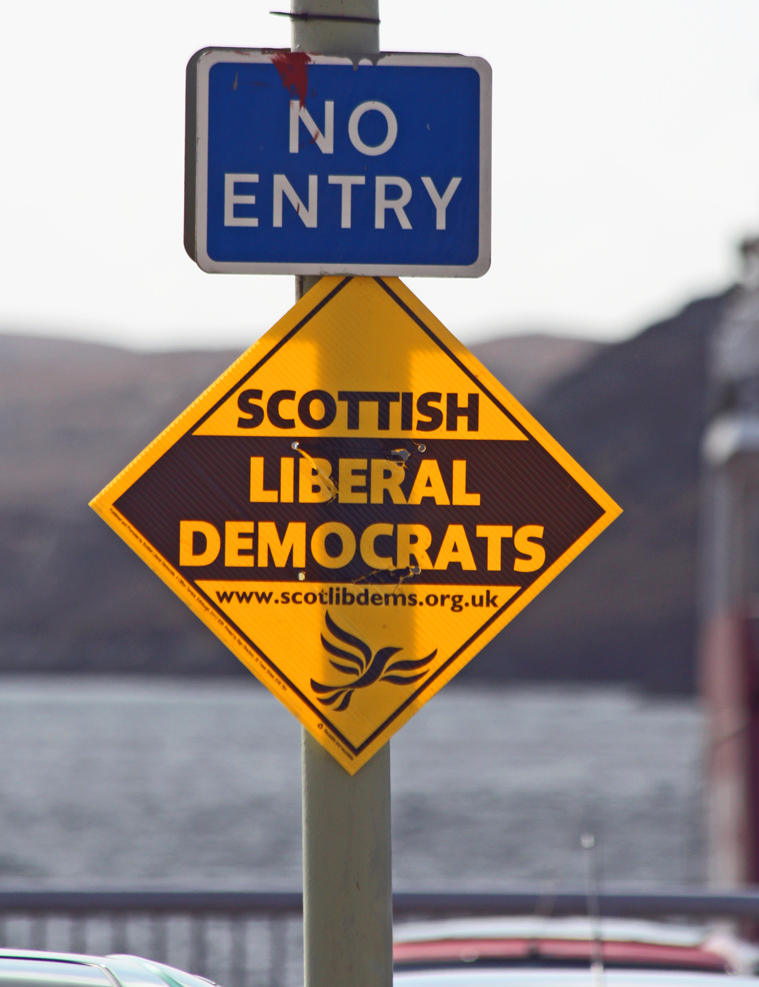
Campaign board for the Scottish Liberal Democrats in Stornoway

In the first quarter of 2008, the party received £1.1 million in donations and had total borrowings and unused credit facilities of £1.1 million (the "total debt" figure reported by the Electoral Commission includes, for example, unused overdraft facilities). This compared to Labour's £3.1 million in donations and £17.8 million of borrowing/credit facilities and the Conservative's £5.7 million in donations and £12.1 million of borrowing/credit facilities.

Specified Associated Organisations (SAOs) review and input policies, representing groups including: ethnic minorities (LDCRE), women (WLD), the LGBT community (LGBT+ Liberal Democrats), youth and students (Young Liberals), engineers and scientists (ALDES), parliamentary candidates (PCA) and local councillors (ALDC). Others can become Associated Organisations (AOs) as campaigning or representative groups in the party, such as the Green Liberal Democrats (GLD), the Liberal Democrat European Group (LDEG) and the Liberal Democrat Disability Association. There are many other groups that are not formally affiliated to the party, including Social Liberal Forum (SLF) and Liberal Reform.

Like the Conservatives, the Lib Dems organise in Northern Ireland. Although they do not contest elections in the province, they work with the Alliance Party of Northern Ireland, described as its sister party and de facto agreeing to support the Alliance in elections. There is a separate local party operating in Northern Ireland, the Northern Ireland Liberal Democrats. It is also a sister party of the Liberal Party of Gibraltar and contested the South-West England constituency at European Parliamentary elections on a joint ticket; they used to take place six on the party list.

The party is a member of Liberal International and the Alliance of Liberals and Democrats for Europe Party. Their 16 MEPs sat in the Renew Europe group in the European Parliament until Britain left the European Union. The party colour is amber, but it is referred to as yellow in the party's style guide. The party anthem is the old Liberal's "The Land" while its slogan is "Build a Brighter Future". The party headquarters are at 8–10 Great George Street London SW1P 3AE.

== Support ==
In the 2005 general election, the party was endorsed by The Independent. Cook noted that in the build-up to the 2010 election, most mainstream press—which was aligned with either the Conservatives or Labour—was "voraciously hostile" to the Lib Dems. In that election, it nevertheless attracted the endorsement of The Guardian and The Observer.

=== Finances ===
Whereas Labour gained funding through its links to trade unions and the Conservatives through big business, the Liberal Democrats have relied on funds raised by the subscriptions and donations provided by its members. The party had some major donors, such as Lord Jacobs, who gave it around £1 million over the course of twenty years until he resigned in 2008. In some years, it struggled to cover its costs; for instance, it made a loss of £670,000 in 2008.

=== Membership ===
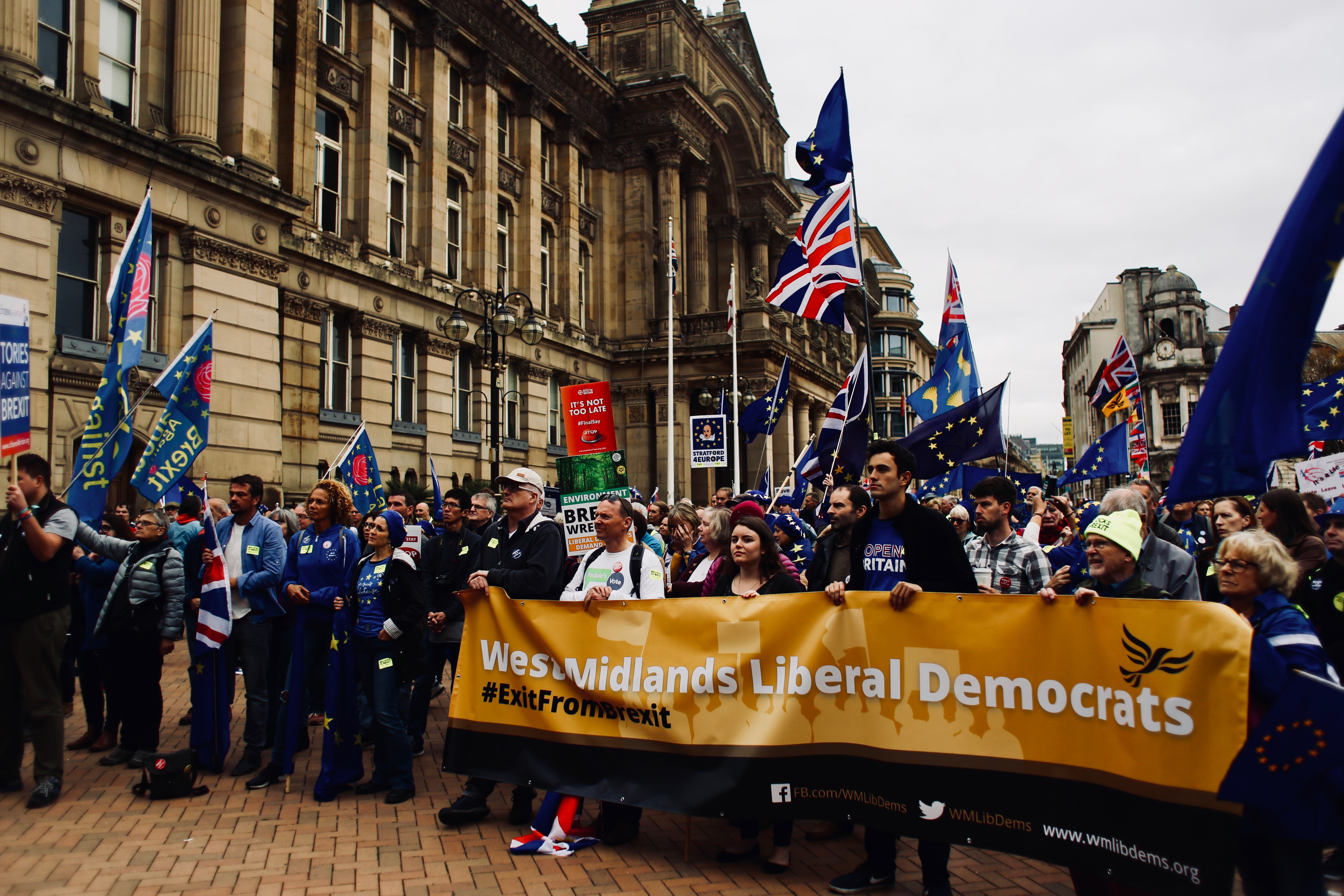
The Liberal Democrat contingent at an anti-Brexit rally in Birmingham in September 2018

In its early years, the caricature of Liberal Democrat members was that of "sandal-wearing, bearded eccentrics obsessed by the minutiae of electoral reform". Based on their 1999 survey of Liberal Democrat members, Whiteley noted that although party members shared many of the same attitudes as the party's voters, there were also "striking differences", namely in that members were "older, more middle-class and better educated" than the voters. Their survey found that party membership was 54% male; and was dominated by middle-class people, with working-class individuals comprising only 5% of members (in contrast to 30% of Labour and 19% of Conservative members at that time). The average age was 59, and 58% of members were aged 56 or over. A third were retired, and a third in full-time employment. A majority worked, or had previously worked, in the non-profit sector. 42% possessed a degree, which was higher than among Labour (30%) and Conservative (19%) members at that time. 65% of members considered themselves religious, with 70% of those being Anglican, 15% Methodist, and 11% Roman Catholic.

As of 1999, 43% of members had previously belonged to the Liberal Party, 14% to the Social Democratic Party, and 42% had joined with no previous political affiliation. 21% of members had joined because of their social contacts, such as friends, family, and colleagues, who were already members. Around 40% of members stated that they joined because they agreed with the party's principles; a further 16% said they joined because of its policies. The majority of members were largely inactive in party activities, with only 22% of those polled indicating that they were willing to attend party meetings.

The senior ranks of the party had long been heavily male-dominated; after the 1997 general election, for instance, only three of its 46 MPs were women. Reinforcing its "male, middle-class image", after the 2010 election, 40% of Liberal Democrat MPs were privately educated. However, following the 2019 general election, seven of its then eleven MPs were female, and the Lib Dem victories in the 2021 Chesham and Amersham by-election, followed by the 2021 North Shropshire by-election, increased the share to nine out of thirteen MPs.

Membership fluctuated between 1988 and 2000 between a low of 69,000 in 2000 and a peak of 101,768 in 1994. Membership increased sharply after the confirmation on 18 April 2017 of the 8 June 2017 general election, surpassing 100,000 on 24 April 2017 and reached an all-time high in June 2019 following the 2019 European elections, increasing further after their win in the Brecon and Radnorshire by-election which reduced the working majority of the Conservative government to just one seat.

In 2019, the party had a minimum of 17,102 registered supporters which were not included in the membership figure of at least 120,000 members.

A research briefing paper by the House of Commons Library published on 30 August 2022, stated that data submitted to the Electoral Commission suggested that the party membership at the end of 2021 stood at 73,544.

According to the December 2024 party accounts, the party membership dropped to 60,000. With registered supporters, the party had 83,174 members/supporters.

Year	Membership
1999	83,000
2000	69,000
2001	73,276
2002	71,636
2003	73,305
2004	72,721
2005	72,031
2006	68,743
2007	65,400
2008	59,810
2009	58,768
2010	65,038
2011	48,934
2012	42,501
2013	43,451
2014	44,680
2015	61,598
2016	79,507
2017	103,300
2018	99,200
2019	120,000
2020	98,247
2021	73,544
2024	60,000

=== Voters ===
The 1997 British Election Study Survey found that the average Liberal Democrat voter was aged 47, with 52% between the ages of 18 and 45. At the time, 16% of Lib Dem voters possessed a degree. Working class or blue collar workers composed 23% of Lib Dem voters, a much higher percentage than was found among the party's membership. The survey found that Liberal Democrat voters shared many attitudes with the members; these voters overwhelmingly desired proportional representation and 63% backed EU membership. Where the voters differed from the members was on the issue of foreign aid; over half of members wanted to increase the UK's foreign aid budget, whereas only a third of Liberal Democrat voters agreed.

Analysing voting patterns from the 1990s, Whiteley et al. argued that highly educated people were more likely than average to vote Liberal Democrat, that older people were less likely than average to vote Liberal Democrat, and that class, gender, or ethnicity had no impact on the tendency to vote for the party.

Ipsos studied voter patterns for the 2010 and 2015 elections. Their support in 2010 came from a fairly even spread of ages; at 5% to 10% of all the age groups studied, peaking in the 35 to 44 range. At the 2015 election, their vote across all age groups declined, but most strongly among younger voters.

== Election results ==
Devolved seats
- London Assembly: 2 / 25
- Scottish Parliament: 10 / 129
- Senedd: 1 / 96

From the Liberal Party, the Liberal Democrats inherited a strong base in Wales and Scotland. In 2010, Cook noted that the party's safe seats "do not fit a very homogeneous pattern", being scattered amidst rural, middle-class suburban, and inner city areas. A key feature of the party's electoral strategy has been foregrounding community politics. Examining the survey evidence, Whiteley et al. argued that the strength of grassroots party activism in a particular area had a big impact on the vote share that the Liberal Democrats received there.

=== General elections ===
Liberal Democrats vote and seat share, 1983–2024

Throughout its history, the first-past-the-post system has prevented the party from receiving a share of parliamentary seats that reflects their share of the vote.

In the 1992 general election, the Lib Dems succeeded the SDP–Liberal Alliance as the third most popular party, behind Labour and the Conservatives. Their popularity never rose to the levels attained by the Alliance, but in later years their seat count rose far above the Alliance's peak, a feat that has been credited to more intelligent targeting of vulnerable seats. The vote percentage for the Alliance in 1987 and the Lib Dems in 2005 is similar, yet the Lib Dems won 62 seats to the Alliance's 22. This was because in 1987, the Alliance vote was fairly evenly spread throughout the country, whereas in 2005, the Liberal Democrat vote was concentrated in particular areas, allowing them to win nearly three times as many parliamentary seats as in 1987 despite getting a slightly lower share of the overall vote.

The first-past-the-post electoral system used in UK general elections is not suited to parties whose vote is evenly divided across the country, resulting in those parties achieving a lower proportion of seats in the Commons than their proportion of the popular vote (see table and graph). The Lib Dems and their Liberal and SDP predecessors have suffered especially, particularly in the 1980s when their electoral support was greatest while the disparity between the votes and the number of MPs returned to parliament was significantly large. The increase in their number of seats in 1997, 2001 and 2005 was attributed to the weakness of the Conservatives and the success of their election strategist Chris Rennard. Lib Dems state that they want 'three-party politics' in the Commons; the most realistic chance of power with first past the post is for the party to be "the kingmakers" in a hung parliament. Party leaders often set out their terms for forming a coalition in such an event—Nick Clegg stated in 2008 that the policy for the 2010 general election was to reform elections, parties and Parliament in a "constitutional convention".

Parliament of the United Kingdom
Election	Leader	Votes		Seats			Position	Government	Ref
Election	Leader	No.	Share	No.	±	Share	Position	Government	Ref
1992	Paddy Ashdown	5,999,606	17.8	20 / 650	▼2	3.1	3rd	Conservative	
1997	Paddy Ashdown	5,242,947	16.8	46 / 659	▲26	7.0	3rd	Labour	
2001	Charles Kennedy	4,814,321	18.3	52 / 659	▲6	7.9	3rd	Labour	
2005	Charles Kennedy	5,985,454	22.0	62 / 646	▲10	9.6	3rd	Labour	
2010	Nick Clegg	6,836,248	23.0	57 / 650	▼5	8.8	3rd	Conservative–Liberal Democrats	
2015	Nick Clegg	2,415,862	7.9	8 / 650	▼49	1.2	▼4th	Conservative	
2017	Tim Farron	2,371,861	7.4	12 / 650	▲4	1.8	4th	Conservative minority with DUP confidence and supply	
2019	Jo Swinson	3,696,419	11.5	11 / 650	▼1	1.7	4th	Conservative	
2024	Ed Davey	3,519,143	12.2	72 / 650	▲61	11.1	▲3rd	Labour	

=== Local elections ===
The party had control of 31 councils in 2008, having held 29 councils prior to the 2008 election. In the 2008 local elections they gained 25% of the vote, placing them ahead of Labour and increasing their control by 34 to more than 4,200 council seats—21% of the total number of seats. In council elections held in May 2011, the Liberal Democrats suffered heavy defeats in the Midlands and North of England. They also lost heavily in the Welsh assembly and Scottish Parliament. In local elections held in May 2012, the Lib Dems lost more than 300 councillors, leaving them with fewer than 3000 for the first time in the party's history. In the 2013 local elections, they lost more councillors. In the 2014 local elections they lost over 300 councillors and the control of two local governments.

In the 2016 local elections, the number of Liberal Democrat councillors increased for the first time since they went into coalition in 2010. The party won 43 seats and increased its vote share by 4%. A number of former MPs who lost their seats in 2015 won council seats in 2016, including former Manchester Withington MP John Leech who won 53% of the vote in a traditionally safe Labour seat. Leech's win was the first gain for any party in Manchester other than Labour for the first time in six years, and provided the city's majority Labour administration with its first opposition for two years. Cheadle's former MP Mark Hunter also won a seat on Stockport Council.

In the 2021 elections, the BBC reported that in England's 143 councils up for election the party won 588 seats (an increase of seven) and won seven councils (an increase of one), holding Cheltenham, Eastleigh, Mole Valley, Three Rivers, Watford and Winchester and gaining St. Albans. In the London Assembly, two seats were won (an increase of one). As of 2022, the party has 2,562 councilors.

In some council areas, some Liberal Democrat candidates stand under the banner of 'Liberal Democrat Focus Team' instead (this being one of the party's registered descriptions with the electoral commission), the stated aim of which being to present themselves as grassroots activists, focusing on local issues along with national issues.

=== European Parliament elections ===
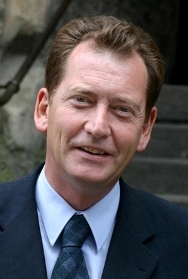
Graham Watson, former leader of the Alliance of Liberals and Democrats for Europe and Secretary General of the International Federation of Liberal Youth, was the Liberal Democrat MEP for South West England and the first Lib Dem to be elected to the European parliament.

As a pro-European party, the Liberal Democrats tended to fare badly at European Parliament elections. In the 2004 local elections their share of the vote was 29% (placing them second, ahead of Labour) and 14.9% in the simultaneous European Parliament elections (putting them in fourth place behind the UK Independence Party). The results of the 2009 European elections were similar with the party achieving a vote of 28% in the county council elections yet achieving only 13.7% in the Europeans despite the elections taking place on the same day. The 2009 elections did however see the party gain one seat from UKIP in the East Midlands region taking the number of representatives in the parliament up to 11. In 2014 the party lost ten seats, leaving them with one MEP. Campaigning on a pro-Remain platform with the slogan "Bollocks to Brexit", the party achieved their best ever results in the 2019 election, taking 19.6% of the vote and winning 16 seats.

In the European Parliament from 2004 to 2019, the party sat with the Alliance of Liberals and Democrats for Europe (ALDE) political group, which favoured further strengthening European integration. The group's leader for seven and a half years was the South West England MEP Graham Watson, who was also the first Liberal Democrat to be elected to the European Parliament when he won the old Somerset and North Devon constituency in 1994. Following the 2019 European elections, the Liberal Democrats joined Renew Europe, the successor group to the ALDE group.

Election	Leaders	Votes		Seats		Position
Election	Leaders	No.	%	No.	±	Position
1989	Paddy Ashdown	944,861	5.9	0 / 81	Steady	▼4th
1994	Paddy Ashdown	2,591,659	16.1	2 / 81	▲2	▲3rd
1999	Paddy Ashdown	1,266,549	11.9	10 / 81	▲8	3rd
2004	Charles Kennedy	2,452,327	14.4	12 / 78	▲2	▼4th
2009	Nick Clegg	2,080,613	13.3	11 / 72	▼1	4th
2014	Nick Clegg	1,087,633	6.6	1 / 73	▼10	▼6th
2019	Vince Cable	3,367,284	19.6	16 / 73	▲15	▲2nd

=== Scottish Parliament elections ===
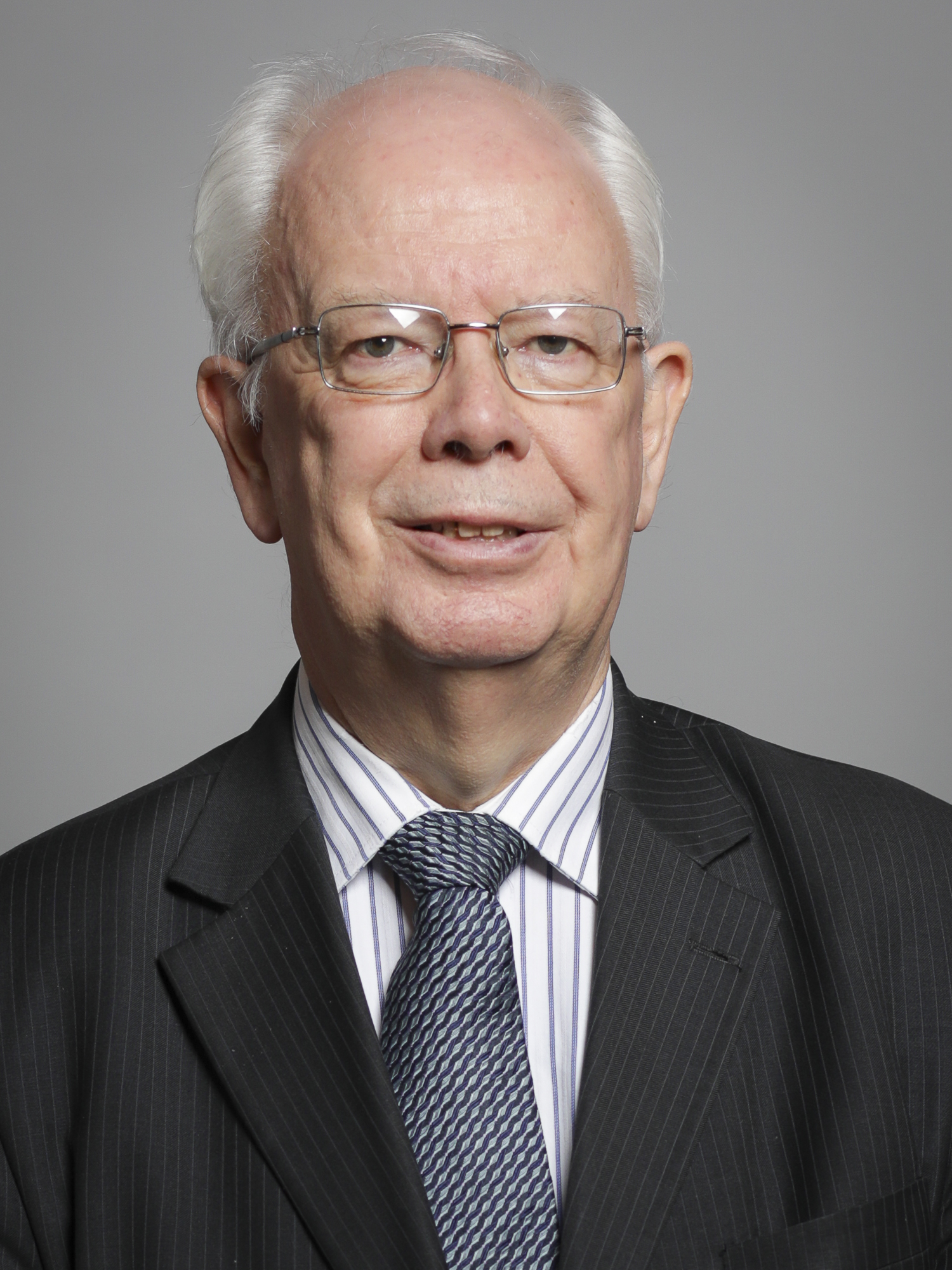
Jim Wallace led the Scottish Liberal Democrats between 1992 and 2005.

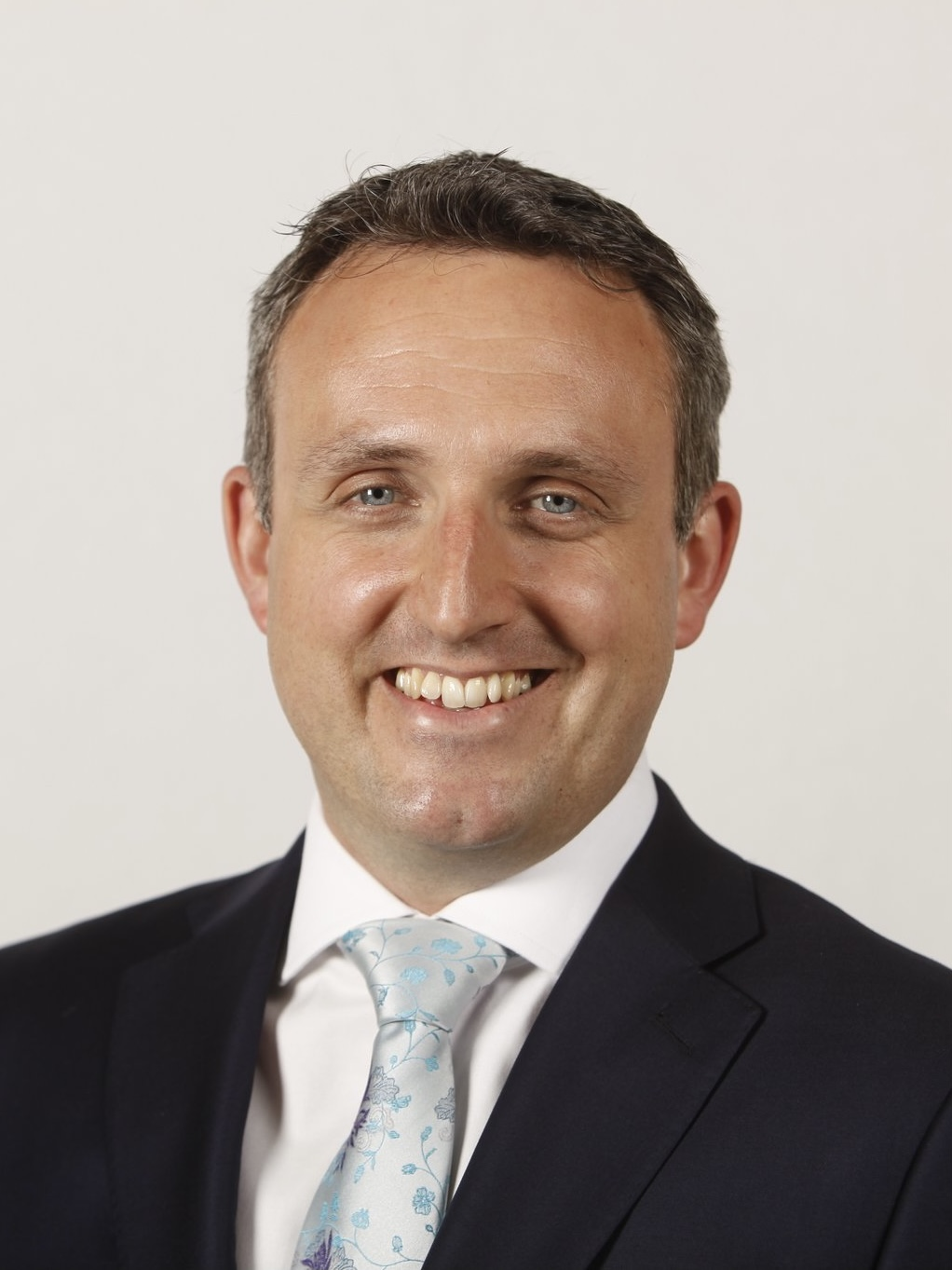
Alex Cole-Hamilton has led the Scottish Liberal Democrats since 2021.

The inaugural Scottish Parliament election was held in 1999 and resulted in the Scottish Liberal Democrats winning a total of 17 seats. The Scottish Liberal Democrats subsequently formed a coalition government with Scottish Labour. Scottish Liberal Democrat leader Jim Wallace became deputy first minister of the new Scottish Executive, a position he held until his resignation as party leader in 2005. Wallace served briefly as acting first minister following the death in office of Donald Dewar in 2000 and the resignation of Henry McLeish in 2001.

The Scottish Liberal Democrats again won 17 seats in the 2003 Scottish Parliament election and again formed a coalition government with Scottish Labour. Nicol Stephen was elected party leader in 2005. Stephen served as deputy first minister for two years. The Scottish Liberal Democrats exited government in 2007 despite losing only one seat in the 2007 Scottish Parliament election. The Scottish National Party emerged from the election as the largest party and formed a minority government. Stephen resigned as party leader the following year.

Tavish Scott was elected party leader in 2008. Scott resigned following what he described as "disastrous" results in the 2011 Scottish Parliament election, in which the Scottish Liberal Democrats were reduced to five seats. Scott claimed that the party had been "damaged" in Scotland by its decision to form a coalition government with the Conservative Party in 2010. He further blamed the coalition government's austerity programme. Willie Rennie, who became party leader in 2011, also blamed the unpopularity of the Conservative–Liberal Democrat coalition.

The Scottish Liberal Democrats contested two Scottish Parliament elections under the leadership of Willie Rennie. The party again returned a total of five seats in the 2016 Scottish Parliament election. The Scottish Liberal Democrats recorded its worst ever result in a Scottish Parliament election by returning its lowest ever tally of four seats and achieving its lowest ever share of the vote in the 2021 Scottish Parliament election. Willie Rennie resigned as leader and was succeeded by Alex Cole-Hamilton in 2021.

Election	Constituency		Regional		Total seats	Seat share
Election	Vote share	Seats	Vote share	Seats	Total seats	Seat share
1999	14.2%	12	12.4%	5	17 / 129	13.2%
2003	15.4%	13	11.8%	4	17 / 129	13.2%
2007	16.2%	11	11.3%	5	16 / 129	12.6%
2011	7.9%	2	5.2%	3	5 / 129	3.9%
2016	7.8%	4	5.2%	1	5 / 129	3.9%
2021	6.9%	4	5.1%	0	4 / 129	3.1%
2026	11.4%	7	9.4%	3	10 / 129	7.8%

=== Senedd elections ===
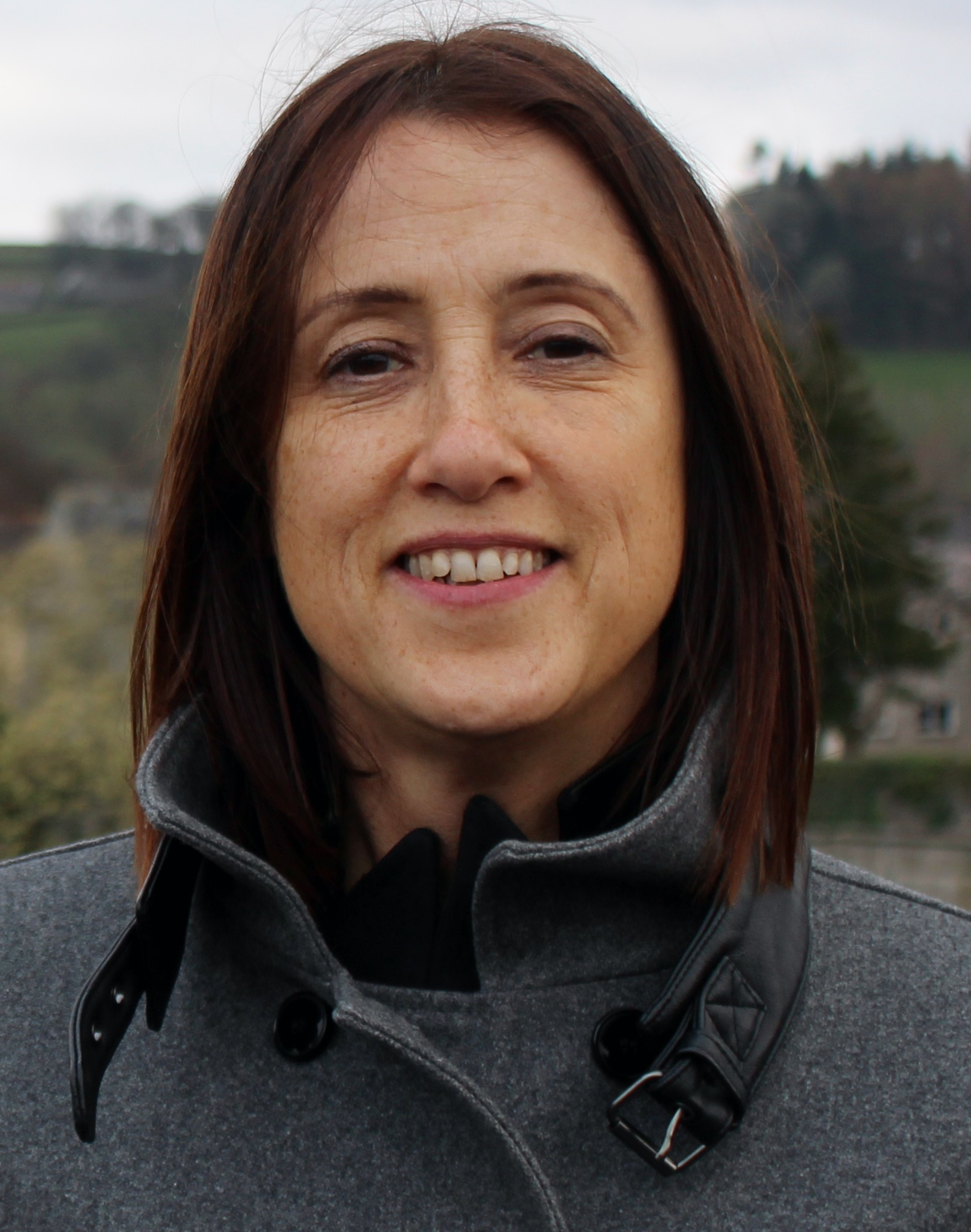
Jane Dodds, leader of the Welsh Liberal Democrats since November 2017

The first elections to the newly created National Assembly for Wales (now Senedd) were in 1999; the Liberal Democrats took six seats in the inaugural Assembly; Welsh Labour won a plurality of seats, but without an overall majority. In October 2000, following a series of close votes, the parties formed a coalition, with the Liberal Democrat leader in the assembly, Michael German, becoming the Deputy First Minister. The deal lasted until the 2003 election, when Labour won enough seats to be able to govern outright.

The party had polled consistently in the first four elections to the National Assembly, returning six representatives in the first three elections and five in the 2011 election, thereby establishing itself as the fourth party in Wales behind Labour, the Conservatives and Plaid Cymru, but fell to just one seat in 2016. Between 2008 and 2016, the leader of the Welsh Liberal Democrats was Kirsty Williams, the Assembly Member (now Member of the Senedd (MS)) for Brecon and Radnorshire, the Assembly's first female party leader.

Following the Senedd Cymru (Members and Elections) Act 2024, the Senedd 60 seats were replaced by 96, and the first-past-the-post system was replaced entirely by proportional representation.

==== Before the Senedd Reform Act ====
Election	Constituency		Regional		Total	
Election	Votes	Seats	Votes	Seats	Seats	Share
1999	14%	3	13%	3	6 / 60	10%
2003	14%	3	13%	3	6 / 60	10%
2007	15%	3	12%	3	6 / 60	10%
2011	11%	1	8%	4	5 / 60	8%
2016	8%	1	6%	0	1 / 60	2%
2021	5%	0	4%	1	1 / 60	2%

==== After Senedd Reform Act ====
Election	Leader	Votes		Seats			Position	Ref
Election	Leader	No.	Share	No.	±	Share	Position	Ref
2026	Jane Dodds	48,811	4.5%	1 / 96	Steady	11.1	▼6th	

== Liberal Democrat Conference ==
The Liberal Democrat Conference, also known inside the party as the Liberal Democrat Federal Conference, is a twice-per-year political conference of the British Liberal Democrats, the third-largest political party in the UK by the number of seats in the House of Commons, and the fourth largest by popular vote following the 2024 general election. The Conference is typically held over three days in the spring and four in the autumn, during the party conference season, at a variety of venues. (Due to COVID-19, the Conference was primarily an online event between spring 2020 and spring 2022 inclusive). It culminates in a speech by the party's Leader.

The Liberal Democrat Conference is organised by the Federal Conference Committee, an internal body of the Liberal Democrats. Conference is the ultimate decision-making body of the Liberal Democrats, one of the few British political parties to use its annual gathering for voting and policy resolution.

== Leadership ==
=== Leaders ===
- Paddy Ashdown (1988–1999)
- Charles Kennedy (1999–2006)
- Menzies Campbell (2006–2007)
- Nick Clegg (2007–2015)
- Tim Farron (2015–2017)
- Vince Cable (2017–2019)
- Jo Swinson (2019)
- Sal Brinton, Ed Davey, Mark Pack (2019–2020; acting)
- Ed Davey (2020–present)

=== Deputy Leaders ===
- Russell Johnston (1988–1992)
- Alan Beith (1992–2003)
- Menzies Campbell (2003–2006)
- Vince Cable (2006–2010)
- Simon Hughes (2010–2014)
- Malcolm Bruce (2014–2015)
- Vacant (2015–2017)
- Jo Swinson (2017–2019)
- Vacant (2019)
- Ed Davey (2019–2020)
- Vacant (2020)
- Daisy Cooper (2020–present)

=== Chair of the Liberal Democrat Parliamentary Party ===
- Alan Beith (until 1999)
- Malcolm Bruce (9 August 1999 – 7 June 2001)
- Mark Oaten (7 June 2001 – 12 June 2003)
- Matthew Taylor (12 June 2003 – 5 May 2005)
- Paul Holmes (5 May 2005 – 25 October 2007)
- Lorely Burt (25 October 2007 – 1 November 2012)
- Paul Burstow (1 November 2012 – 5 June 2013)
- Annette Brooke (5 June 2013 - 30 March 2025)
- Lisa Smart (June 2024 - 9 September 2025)
- Steff Aquarone (September 2025 - September 2026)
- Roz Savage (September 2026 - present)

=== Party Presidents ===
Presidents chair the Federal Board. They are elected for a three-year term, starting on 1 January and ending on 31 December. They may serve a maximum of two terms.

- Ian Wrigglesworth (1988–1990)
- Charles Kennedy (1990–1994)
- Robert Maclennan (1994–1998)
- Diana Maddock (1998–2000)
- Navnit Dholakia (2000–2004)
- Simon Hughes (2004–2008)
- Ros Scott (2008–2010)
- Tim Farron (2010–2015)
- Sal Brinton (2015–2019)
- Mark Pack (2020–2026)
- Josh Babarinde (2026–present)

=== Leaders in the House of Lords ===
Leader	Entered office	Left office
Roy Jenkins, Baron Jenkins of Hillhead (1920–2003)	16 July 1988	4 May 1997
William Rodgers, Baron Rodgers of Quarry Bank (b. 1928)	4 May 1997	13 June 2001
Shirley Williams, Baroness Williams of Crosby (1930–2021)	13 June 2001	22 June 2004
Tom McNally, Baron McNally (b. 1943)	22 June 2004	15 October 2013
Jim Wallace, Baron Wallace of Tankerness (b. 1954)	15 October 2013	13 September 2016
Richard Newby, Baron Newby (b. 1953)	13 September 2016	24 July 2025
Jeremy Purvis, Baron Purvis of Tweed (b. 1974)	24 July 2025	Present

=== Privy counsellors ===
This is a list of the 33 Lib. Dem. Members, who have sworn their (lifetime) Privy Council Oath of the Privy Council of the United Kingdom, along with the roles they fulfil. As of January 2025, there are 746 members on the council.

- Sir Danny Alexander PC; Secretary of State for Scotland (2010); Chief Secretary to the Treasury (2010–2015)
- Norman Baker PC; Minister at the Home Office (2013–2014)
- Alan Beith PC; Deputy Leader of the Lib. Dem. (1992–2003); Lib. Dem Spokesman for Home Affairs (1994–1999); Lib. Dem Shadow Leader of the House of Commons (1999–2003); chairman, House of Commons Justice Select Committee (2007–2015)
- Tom Brake PC; Deputy Leader of the House of Commons (2012–2015); Foreign Affairs Spokesperson for the Lib. Dem (2016–2017); Lib. Dem Shadow First Secretary of State and spokesperson for Exiting the European Union (2017–2019)
- Dame Annette Brooke PC; Long-serving MP (2001–2015)
- Malcolm Bruce PC; Leader of the Scottish Lib. Dem (1988–1992); Chairman of the International Development Committee (2005–2015); Deputy Leader of the Lib. Dem (2014–2015); Lib. Dem Scotland spokesperson in the Lords (2024–present)
- Paul Burstow PC; Minister of State for Care Services (2010–2012)
- Sir Vince Cable PC; Secretary of State for Business, Innovation and Skills (2010–2015); Leader of the Lib. Dem (2017–2019)
- Menzies Campbell PC; Foreign Affairs Spokesperson for the Lib. Dem (1997–2006); Deputy Leader of the Lib. Dem (2003–2006); Leader of the Lib. Dem (2006–2007); Defence Spokesperson for the Lib. Dem (2017–2019)
- Alistair Carmichael PC; Government Deputy Chief Whip in the House of Commons (2010–2013); Secretary of State for Scotland (2013–2015); Lib. Dem Home Affairs spokesman (2015–2016, 2020–2024); Chief Whip of the Lib. Dem (2017–2020); Lib. Dem Spokesman for Northern Ireland (2017–2024); Lib. Dem Spokesman for Foreign and Commonwealth Affairs (2020); Lib. Dem Spokesman for Justice (2022–2024); Chair of the Environment, Food and Rural Affairs Select Committee (2024–present)
- Sir Nick Clegg PC; Leader of the Lib. Dem (2007–2015); Deputy Prime Minister and Lord President of the council (2010–2015)
- Sir Ed Davey PC; Secretary of State for Energy and Climate Change (2012–2015); Lib. Dem Leader (2020–present)
- Navnit Dholakia, Baron Dholakia PC; Deputy Leader of the Lib. Dem in the House of Lords (2004–2024)
- Stephen Dorrell PC; Secretary of State for National Heritage (1994–1995); Secretary of State for Health (1995–1997)
- Lynne Featherstone PC; Parliamentary Under-Secretary of State for International Development (2012–2014); Minister of State at the Home Office (2014–2015); Lib. Dem Spokesperson for Energy and Climate Change (2015–2019)
- Don Foster, Baron Foster of Bath PC; Long-serving MP (1992–2015); Parliamentary Under Secretary at the Department for Communities and Local Government (2012–2013); Comptroller of the Household (2013–2015); Lib. Dem Spokesperson for Business, Energy and Industrial Strategy (2016–2017)
- Susan Garden, Baroness Garden of Frognal PC; Baroness-in-waiting (2010–2013; 2014–2015); Deputy Speaker of the House of Lords (2018–present)
- David Heath PC; Long-serving MP (1997–2015)
- Sir Simon Hughes PC; Deputy Leader of the Lib. Dem (2010–2014); Minister at the Ministry of Justice (2013–2015)
- Archy Kirkwood PC; Lib. Dem Chief Whip in the Lords (1992–1997)
- Susan Kramer, Baroness Kramer PC; Minister of State for Transport (2013–2015); Lib. Dem Treasury spokesperson (2015–2019); Lib. Dem Treasury and Economy spokesperson in the Lords (2024–present)
- David Laws PC; Chief Secretary to the Treasury (2010); Minister for the Cabinet Office (2012–2015)
- Tom McNally, Baron McNally PC; Lib. Dem Leader in the House of Lords (2004–2013); Minister at the Ministry of Justice (2010–2013)
- Michael Moore PC; Secretary of State for Scotland (2010–2013)
- Richard Newby, Baron Newby PC; Lib. Dem Chief Whip in the House of Lords (2012–2016); Leader of the Lib. Dem in the House of Lords (2016–present)
- Lindsay Northover, Baroness Northover PC; Parliamentary Under-Secretary of State for International Development (2014–2015)
- Bill Rodgers, Baron Rodgers of Quarry Bank PC; Secretary of State for Transport (1976–1979); Shadow Secretary of State for Defence (1979–1980); Leader of the Lib. Dem in the House of Lords (1997–2001)
- John Sinclair PC; Long-serving MP (2001–15); Chairman of the Finance and Services Committee (2010–2015)
- Paul Tyler PC; Long-serving MP (1974; 1992–2005) and member of the House of Lords (2005–2021)
- William Wallace, Baron Wallace of Saltaire PC; Lord-in-waiting (2010–2015)
- Jim Wallace, Baron Wallace of Tankerness PC; Leader of the Scottish Lib. Dem (1992–2005); Deputy First Minister of Scotland (1999–2005); Minister for Justice (Scotland) (1999–2003); Minister for Enterprise and Lifelong Learning (Scotland) (2003–2005); Advocate General for Scotland (2010–2015); Leader of the Lib. Dem in the House of Lords (2013–2016)
- Sir Steve Webb PC; Minister at the Department for Work and Pensions (2010–2015)
- Jenny Willott PC; Parliamentary Under-Secretary of State at Department for Business, Innovation and Skills (2013–2014).

=== Leaders in the European Parliament ===
- Graham Watson, 1994–2002 (President of the Alliance of Liberals and Democrats for Europe Party)
- Diana Wallis, 2002–2004
- Chris Davies, 2004–2006
- Diana Wallis, 2006–2007 (vice-president of the European Parliament)
- Andrew Duff, 2007–2009
- Fiona Hall, 2009–2014
- Catherine Bearder, 2014–2019
- Caroline Voaden, 2019–2020

The Liberal Democrats did not have representation in the European Parliament prior to 1994.

=== Chairs of the English Liberal Democrats ===
- Paul Farthing (1994–1999)
- Dawn Davidson (2000–2003)
- Stan Collins (2004–2006)
- Brian Orrell (2007–2009)
- Jonathan Davies (2010–2011)
- Peter Ellis (2012–2014)
- Steve Jarvis (2015–2016)
- Liz Leffman (2017–2018)
- Tahir Maher (2019)
- Gerald Vernon-Jackson (2020)
- Alison Rouse (2021–2024)
- Lucas North (2024)
- Caroline Pidgeon (January 2025 – present)

=== Leaders of the Scottish Liberal Democrats ===
- Malcolm Bruce (3 March 1988 – 18 April 1992)
- Jim Wallace (18 April 1992 – 23 June 2005)
- Nicol Stephen (27 June 2005 – 2 July 2008)
- Tavish Scott (26 August 2008 – 7 May 2011)
- Willie Rennie (17 May 2011 – 20 August 2021)
- Alex Cole-Hamilton (20 August 2021–present)

=== Leaders of the Welsh Liberal Democrats ===
- Richard Livsey (1988–1992)
- Alex Carlile (1992–1997)
- Richard Livsey (1997–2001)
- Lembit Öpik (2001–2007)
- Mike German (2007–2008)
- Kirsty Williams (2008–2016)
- Mark Williams (2016–2017)
- Kirsty Williams (Acting, 2017)
- Jane Dodds (2017–present)

== Current MPs ==
72 Liberal Democrat members of Parliament (MPs) were elected to the House of Commons at the 2024 general election.

Member	Constituency	Majority
Jamie Stone	Caithness, Sutherland and Easter Ross	10,489
Alistair Carmichael	Orkney and Shetland	7,807
Wendy Chamberlain	North East Fife	13,479
Christine Jardine	Edinburgh West	16,470
Tim Farron	Westmorland and Lonsdale	21,472
Layla Moran	Oxford West and Abingdon	14,894
Daisy Cooper	St Albans	19,834
Munira Wilson	Twickenham	21,457
Wera Hobhouse	Bath	11,218
Sarah Olney	Richmond Park	17,155
Ed Davey	Kingston and Surbiton	17,235
Sarah Green	Chesham and Amersham	5,451
Helen Morgan	North Shropshire	15,311
Richard Foord	Honiton and Sidmouth	6,700
Sarah Dyke	Glastonbury and Somerton	6,611
Calum Miller	Bicester and Woodstock	4,958
David Chadwick	Brecon, Radnor and Cwm Tawe	1,472
Bobby Dean	Carshalton and Wallington	7,905
Tom Morrison	Cheadle	12,235
Marie Goldman	Chelmsford	4,753
Max Wilkinson	Cheltenham	7,210
Jess Brown-Fuller	Chichester	8,138
Sarah Gibson	Chippenham	12,172
Olly Glover	Didcot and Wantage	6,233
Chris Coghlan	Dorking and Horley	5,391
Josh Babarinde	Eastbourne	12,204
Liz Jarvis	Eastleigh	1,546
Charlotte Cane	Ely and East Cambridgeshire	495
Helen Maguire	Epsom and Ewell	3,686
Monica Harding	Esher and Walton	12,003
Anna Sabine	Frome and East Somerset	5,415
Zöe Franklin	Guildford	8,429
Victoria Collins	Harpenden and Berkhamsted	10,708
Tom Gordon	Harrogate and Knaresborough	8,238
Lisa Smart	Hazel Grove	6,500
Freddie van Mierlo	Henley and Thame	6,267
John Milne	Horsham	2,517
Angus MacDonald	Inverness, Skye and West Ross-shire	2,160
James MacCleary	Lewes	12,624
Joshua Reynolds	Maidenhead	2,963
Brian Mathew	Melksham and Devizes	2,401
Vikki Slade	Mid Dorset and North Poole	1,352
Susan Murray	Mid Dunbartonshire	9,673
Alison Bennett	Mid Sussex	6,662
Lee Dillon	Newbury	2,377
Martin Wrigley	Newton Abbot	2,246
Ben Maguire	North Cornwall	10,767
Ian Roome	North Devon	6,744
Alex Brewer	North East Hampshire	634
Steffan Aquarone	North Norfolk	2,585
Pippa Heylings	South Cambridgeshire	10,641
Roz Savage	South Cotswolds	4,973
Caroline Voaden	South Devon	7,127
Andrew George	St Ives	13,786
Ian Sollom	St Neots and Mid Cambridgeshire	4,621
Manuela Perteghella	Stratford-on-Avon	7,122
Alasdair Pinkerton	Surrey Heath	5,640
Luke Taylor	Sutton and Cheam	3,801
Gideon Amos	Taunton and Wellington	11,939
Cameron Thomas	Tewkesbury	6,262
Claire Young	Thornbury and Yate	3,014
Rachel Gilmour	Tiverton and Minehead	3,507
Steve Darling	Torbay	5,349
Mike Martin	Tunbridge Wells	8,687
Tessa Munt	Wells and Mendip Hills	11,121
Edward Morello	West Dorset	7,789
Paul Kohler	Wimbledon	12,610
Danny Chambers	Winchester	13,821
Charles Maynard	Witney	4,339
Will Forster	Woking	11,245
Clive Jones	Wokingham	8,345
Adam Dance	Yeovil	12,268

Another 27 Liberal Democrat candidates at the 2024 Election achieved second places (25 in England and 2 in Wales). Those polling within 10% of the winner (in 11 constituencies) were as follows:

Member	Constituency	Majority
Paul Follows	Godalming and Ash	891
Dominic Martin	East Hampshire	1,275
Khalil Yousuf	Farnham and Bordon	1,349
Gary Jackson	North Dorset	1,589
Matthew Green	South Shropshire	1,624
Geoff Cooper	Romsey and Southampton North	2,191
Paul Hodgkinson	North Cotswolds	3,357
Gordon Birtwistle	Burnley	3,420
Phil Hutty	Torridge and Tavistock	3,950
Sally Symington	South West Hertfordshire	4,456
Prad Bains	Hamble Valley	4,802

== Reception ==
In 2006, Whiteley et al. noted that the Liberal Democrats were "a major force in contemporary British politics". Although throughout its history, the party had been relegated to third party status, they argued that it had the capability of breaking through to become one of the country's main two parties if proportional representation (or something like it) was introduced, or if either the Conservatives or Labour were severely weakened by splitting in two.

== See also ==
- Glee Club (UK politics)
- Liberal Democrat Conference
- Liberal Democrat Voice
- Liberal Left (UK)
- Liberal Party (UK)
- Liberal Reform
- List of Liberal Democrat MPs
- List of liberal theorists
- List of Liberal Party and Liberal Democrats (UK) general election manifestos
- List of major liberal parties considered left
- Lloyd George Society
- Politics of the United Kingdom
- Social Liberal Forum
- Liberal Democrat frontbench team
- Frontbench Team of Ed Davey
