= Beveridge Group =

Group within the Liberal Democrats

The Beveridge Group is a centre-left group within the Liberal Democrat party in the UK. It was set up in 2001 by MPs Alistair Carmichael, Paul Holmes, John Barrett and John Pugh to promote debate within the party regarding public service provision.

The group was set up largely in response to a perceived rightwards drift in Liberal Democrat thinking, typified by the economic liberalism of Lib Dem economic spokesman Vince Cable and former Home Affairs spokesman Mark Oaten. The Beveridge group later emerged as an ideological counterforce to supporters of The Orange Book.

In its first article, written by Alistair Carmichael in 2003, the group questioned the claim in the Liberal Democrat policy paper Setting Business Free that the party should "start with a bias in favour of market solutions". Responding to this argument, the paper asked: "should the party of Beveridge and Keynes approach issues with a prejudice in favour of the free market system? Should we enter every policy debate with an underlying belief that private is always better than public? I certainly do not think so. That was the approach which led the Conservatives to undertake the disastrous privatisation of British Rail in the mid 1990s."

The role of the Beveridge Group has been brought into focus with the rise of Nick Clegg, another leading market liberal and Orange Book contributor, to the leadership of the party in 2007, and more so after his decision to lead the Liberal Democrats into a Coalition government with the Conservatives following the hung parliament result in the May 2010 general election. It has been noted that along with Clegg (deputy prime minister up to the 2015 elections), MPs who contributed to the Orange Book or are otherwise associated with the market liberal faction occupied many positions in the Coalition Cabinet during the Liberal Democrats time in office, including Vince Cable (business secretary), David Laws (briefly Chief Secretary to the Treasury) and Danny Alexander (Chief Secretary to the Treasury), with others such as Ed Davey and Steve Webb holding ministerial posts, while it has been speculated that the more socially liberal Beveridge Group members were under-represented in the Cabinet, perhaps signalling a 'takeover' of the Liberal Democrats by the so-called Orange Bookers.

However, Beveridge Group members Norman Baker and Alistair Carmichael each held ministerial ranks in the government, as parliamentary under-secretary for transport and chief deputy whip for the Liberal Democrats in the government respectively, with Mark Hunter assigned as an assistant whip. Furthermore, in 2010 Group members Simon Hughes and Tim Farron were elected deputy party leader and party president, respectively. After the 2015 general election, Farron won the Liberal Democrat leadership election, beating his rival, Norman Lamb.

On 18 December 2013, Simon Hughes was appointed minister of state at the Ministry of Justice.

== Membership ==
As of May 2017, there was a membership of 30 current, or former, MPs:

Sitting MPs (2)

- Alistair Carmichael MP
- Tim Farron MP and Former Leader

Former MPs (28)

- Sandra Gidley
- Paul Holmes
- David Howarth
- Chris Huhne Former Secretary of State for Energy and Climate Change
- Paul Keetch
- Paul Rowen
- Phil Willis
- Richard Younger-Ross
- Evan Harris
- John Barrett
- Norman Baker
- Annette Brooke
- Don Foster
- Andrew George
- Mike Hancock
- John Hemming
- Martin Horwood
- Simon Hughes Former Deputy Leader of the Liberal Democrats
- John Pugh
- Dan Rogerson
- Bob Russell
- Adrian Sanders
- Mark Williams
- Roger Williams
- Stephen Williams
- Jenny Willott
- Mark Hunter
- John Leech

== See also ==
- William Beveridge
- John Maynard Keynes
- Liberal Democrat Conference
- Liberal Reform
- Social Democratic Party
- Social Liberal Forum
- Social liberalism
- Social market economy
- Welfare state
