= The Orange Book =

Book by Paul Marshall and others

The Orange Book: Reclaiming Liberalism
- Author: Paul Marshall and David Laws (editors)
- Language: English
- Subject: Politics, liberalism
- Publisher: Profile Books
- Publication date: 2 September 2004
- Publication place: United Kingdom
- Media type: Print (paperback)
- Pages: 302
- ISBN: 1-86197-797-2
- OCLC: 59265240
- Followed by: Britain After Blair – A Liberal Agenda

The Orange Book: Reclaiming Liberalism is a book written by a group of prominent British Liberal Democrat politicians and edited by David Laws and Paul Marshall in 2004. Three contributors later became leaders of the Liberal Democrats: Nick Clegg, Vince Cable and Ed Davey. Other contributors include Chris Huhne, Susan Kramer, Mark Oaten and Steve Webb. The book's central philosophy, and some of its ideas, are supported by Liberal Reform, an internal group of the Liberal Democrats. It has been compared with The Purple Book: A Progressive Future For Labour, published seven years later by senior members of the UK's Labour Party, who were associated with the governments of Tony Blair and Gordon Brown.

The term Orange Bookers refers to those in the party who subscribe to the book's emphasis on greater personal choice and possible market solutions.

In the book, the group offers liberal solutions—often stressing the role of choice and competition—to several societal issues such as public healthcare, pensions, environment, globalization, social and agricultural policy, local government, the European Union and prisons. It is usually seen as the most economically liberal publication that the Liberal Democrats have produced in recent times.

== Chapters and contributors ==
- "Reclaiming Liberalism: a liberal agenda for the Liberal Democrats" – David Laws
- "Liberalism and localism" – Ed Davey
- "Europe: a Liberal future" – Nick Clegg
- "Global governance, legitimacy and renewal" – Chris Huhne
- "Liberal economics and social justice" – Vince Cable
- "Harnessing the market to achieve environmental goals" – Susan Kramer
- "UK health services: a liberal agenda for reform" – David Laws
- "Tough Liberalism: a liberal approach to cutting crime" – Mark Oaten
- "Children, the family and the state: a liberal agenda" – Steve Webb and Jo Holland
- "Pension reform: a settlement for a new century" – Paul Marshall

== Ideology ==
Orange Book liberalism is a classical liberal ideology, mostly within the Liberal Democrats, which seeks to balance the four main strands of liberal thought—social liberalism, economic liberalism, cultural liberalism and political liberalism. Orange Book liberalism is represented within the Liberal Democrats by the pressure group Liberal Reform.

"Orange Booker" is now a well-used term for identifying Liberal Democrats who adhere more strongly to economic and personal liberal principles, compared to those who more strongly identify with centre-left beliefs such as members of the Social Liberal Forum or the Beveridge Group. Many Orange Bookers were prominent figures in the 2010–2015 Conservative/Liberal Democrat coalition government, such as former Deputy Prime Minister Sir Nick Clegg and Chris Huhne, former Energy Secretary, and current leader Sir Ed Davey. While the leader of the Liberal Democrats in the 2000s, Charles Kennedy is less associated with the Orange Book, and in turn the 2010–2015 Conservative/Liberal Democrat coalition government.

== Reception ==
Six years following the book's publication, the Liberal Democrats joined with the Conservatives to form a coalition government. Of the nine authors of the book who were elected MPs, one (Mark Oaten) resigned before the 2010 election, one (Chris Huhne) resigned in 2013 having been in the cabinet, and the remaining seven were all members of the government in 2015. Edward Stourton from the BBC radio show Analysis argued that the Orange Book movement within the Liberal Democrats was important in the founding of the coalition government with the Conservatives. Conservative MP David Davis found a number of "areas of overlap" between Conservative policies and the views of the book authors.

Historian and Labour politician Tristram Hunt said that the Orange Book debate was a revival of the debates in liberal circles between the classical liberalism of William Gladstone and politicians like David Lloyd George.

Richard Grayson, a member of the Social Liberal Forum, said that such Gladstonian liberalism was replaced in the early 20th century with a commitment to the welfare state because of the work of Thomas Hill Green, Leonard Hobhouse and the economist John A. Hobson; therefore, The Orange Book writers were seeking to overturn nearly a century of Liberal party history.

== See also ==
- Blue Labour
- Britannia Unchained
