= Liberal Reform =

Pressure group within the UK Liberal Democrats

- Co-Chairs: Fraser Coppin; Alan Muhammed
- Founded: 13 February 2012; 13 years ago
- Headquarters: London
- Ideology: Liberalism; Economic liberalism Social liberalism
- Political position: Centre
- Slogan: 'Four-Cornered Liberalism'

Website
- www.liberalreform.org.uk

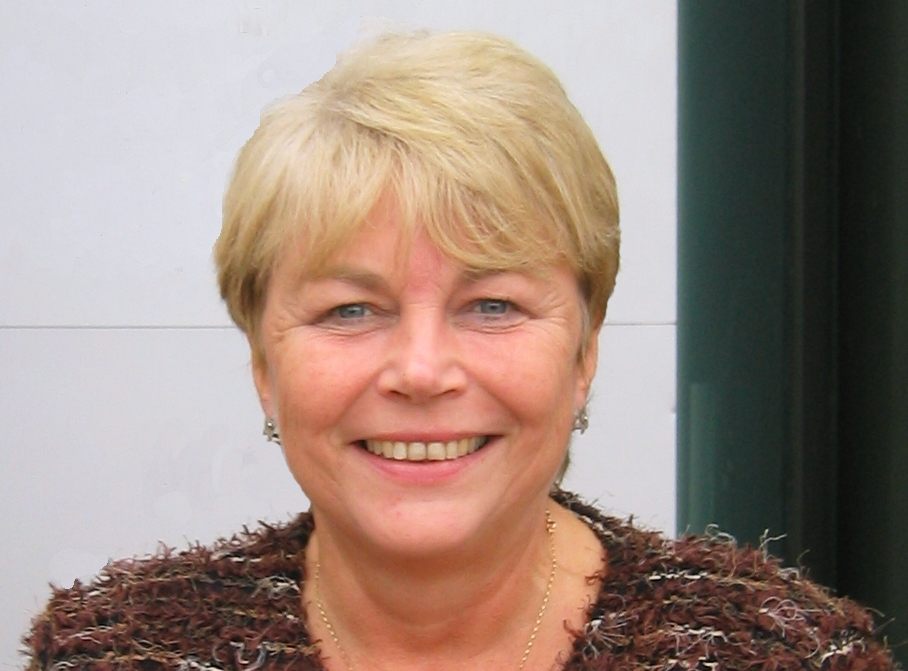
Jenny Randerson is a member of Liberal Reform's Advisory Council and a former Deputy First Minister of Wales and Welsh Office Minister. In 2011, she was created a life peer.

Liberal Reform is an internal political group of members of the British Liberal Democrats. Membership of the group is open to any Liberal Democrat member, and is free of charge. It was launched on 13 February 2012, and describes itself as a broadly centrist group that seeks to promote 'four-cornered liberalism' within the party. Each 'corner' consists respectively of economic, social, personal and political liberalism, mirroring the opening chapter of The Orange Book by David Laws. It states that it accepts that virtually all Liberal Democrats believe in four-cornered liberalism, but emphasises its belief that economic liberalism, consisting of the promotion of open markets, competition and free trade, "has to be a key component of modern liberalism". Liberal Reform organises a number of fringe events at the twice-per-year Liberal Democrat Conference.

Liberal Reform's four-cornered liberalism is exemplified by specific policy goals: a belief in the importance of open markets and free trade; strong opposition to discrimination and abuses of power; the need to reduce taxation for those on low and middle incomes by such measures as increasing the tax-free personal allowance; the right to privacy; the provision of citizens' freedom of information and of high-quality and accountable public services; and the right of senior citizens to control their own pension savings. It also endorses the principles described in the preamble to the party's Constitution, which states: "The Liberal Democrats exist to build and safeguard a fair, free and open society,… in which no one shall be enslaved by poverty, ignorance, or conformity".

Liberal Reform intends to be "at the heart of the party, encouraging friendly debate and participation with other groups", in the cause of both Liberal Democrats and those of a liberal outlook. All members of Liberal Reform are active campaigners for the party.

The group's Mission Statement says that:

"Liberal Reform exists within the Liberal Democrats to promote personal liberty and a fair society supported by free, open and competitive markets as the foundation of the party’s policy. We advocate a liberalism that draws upon the values of entrepreneurship, competition and innovation to deliver a society that empowers individuals through freedom and opportunity. Our vision of freedom is all encompassing, covering personal, political, economic and social liberties. As such, we seek to put the rights of individuals first, but recognise the importance of challenging concentrations of power where they develop, both within and beyond the state."

== Overview ==
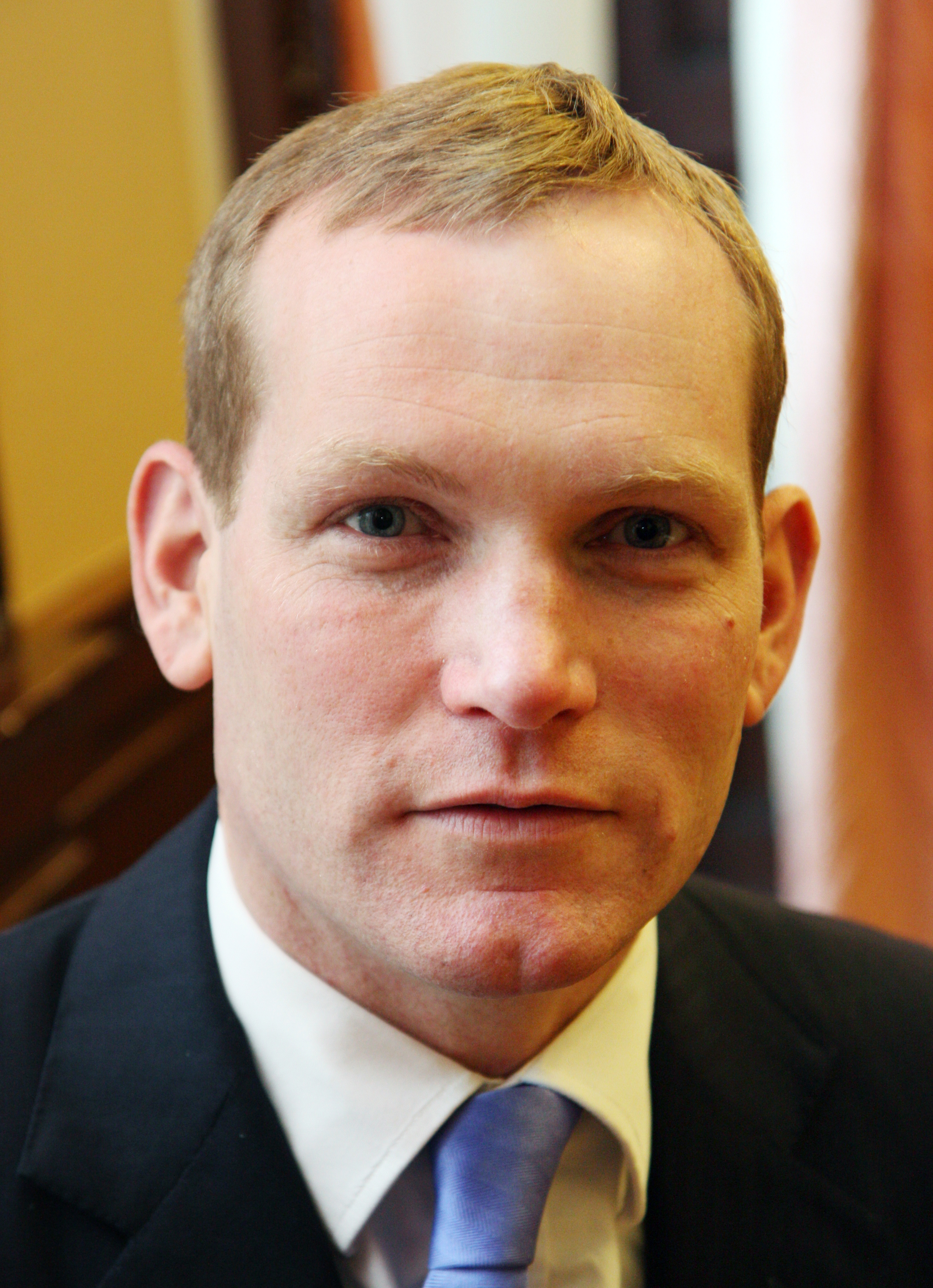
Former Home Office and Foreign Office Minister of State, and political author, Jeremy Browne, has addressed Liberal Reform events and is a member of its Advisory Council.

Liberal Reform was launched in February 2012. It aims to promote 'four-cornered liberalism': personal, political, social and economic freedom.

Liberal Reform broadly supports the open market, free trade and economically liberal philosophy of The Orange Book, published in 2004 and co-edited by David Laws, who would go on to serve as schools minister in the 2010-2015 coalition government.

Liberal Reform argues that while economic freedom is itself a virtue, it has proven to be the only reliable way for modern societies to generate sufficient resources to promote individual freedom and security, and by "spreading opportunity through the provision of high quality public services and a safety net for those who need it".

Liberal Reform also argues that the state must be accountable and open to its citizens, ensuring equal treatment "regardless of gender, race or sexuality", and in keeping with its views on social and personal liberalism, says that it believes it is necessary to guard against excessive state power, and that public monopolies can be just as unacceptable to citizens as private ones. It believes that taxation should be kept as low as possible to avoid interference with personal liberty, but must be set at a level to ensure the provision of well-funded and accountable public services.

== Policies and issues ==
=== Secret courts ===
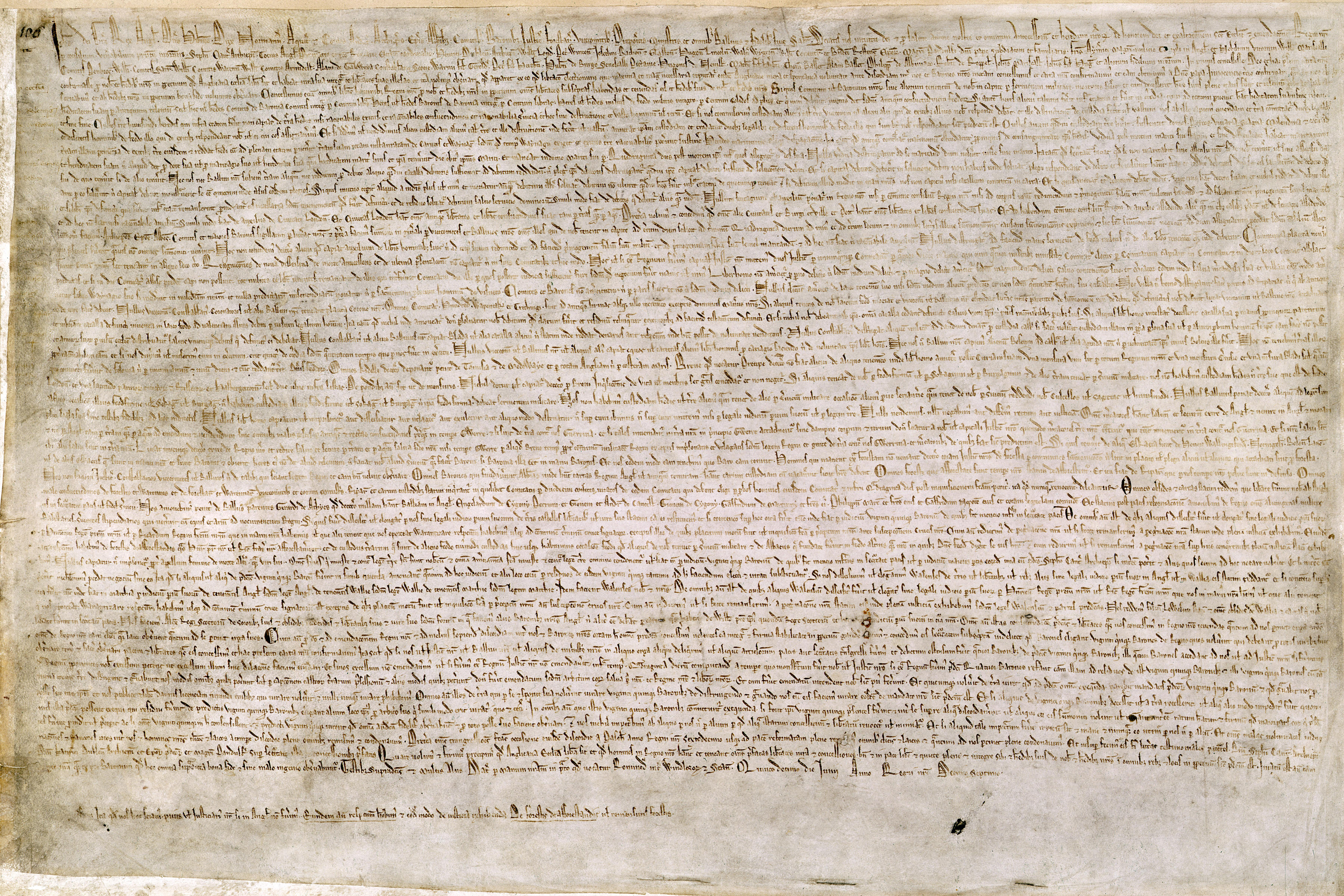
Liberal Reform contends that the right to a fair trial, enshrined in Magna Carta in 1215 (above), is now in jeopardy since the passing of the Justice and Security Act 2013.

Liberal Reform has campaigned strongly against the presence of secret courts, and the legislation that enables them to operate. In an open letter to MPs, signed by 116 Liberal Democrats and published in March 2013, Liberal Reform, together with other Liberal Democrats, argued that Part II of the Justice and Security Bill, later to become the Justice and Security Act 2013, would prevent the guarantee of a fair trial, enshrined in English law since Magna Carta. It argued that "liberty has been sacrificed in the name of security", and that similar laws had already led to the facilitation of kidnap and torture. It cited the cases of two individuals, Binyam Mohamed and Abdelhakim Belhaj, who it said had been the victims of such abuses of power, and that the new law would exclude victims from the trials of their own claims for damages. It stated that the Bill could also apply to habeas corpus proceedings if the Bill were to be passed. Its concluding lines began, "We call on all MPs now to act before it is too late, and they become complicit in irrevocable damage to our constitution.This issue goes beyond party politics".

The Liberal Democrat Conference, its main twice-per-year gathering, had already voted overwhelmingly against the legislation. However, it was passed into law, with only seven of the party's then-56 MPs voting against on third reading on 4 March 2013. An emergency motion was filed for the party's Spring Conference the following weekend. The Conference again rejected the legislation by an overwhelming majority.

=== Reasons for opposing a 'progressive alliance' ===
Liberal Reform has led the campaign within the Liberal Democrats against a so-called 'progressive alliance', which would see the party stand down for Labour and Green Party candidates at election time in an attempt to defeat the Conservatives. This campaign came to a head in Southport in 2018, where the Liberal Democrat Spring Conference voted to remove the 'progressive alliance' term from a motion on the party's strategy.

Liberal Reform believes the term would be a "slippery slope" that would soon commit the party to entering a formal electoral pact with parties that do not share the Liberal Democrats' support for economically liberal policies. Liberal Reform is opposed to a pact with a Labour Party which it believes to have been increasingly attracted to centralised state control in recent years, and to a "return to the 1970s" on economic policies. It also opposes a pact with the Green Party, which it contends supports an agenda that is not in favour of free trade.

However, Liberal Reform does not reject co-operation with groups, organisations and parties that share the party's aims, and in opposing the use of the term 'progressive alliance' in the motion, it stated that it believes in “working with those on all sides of politics who share goals with us to achieve them”.

== Organisation and structure ==
Liberal Reform is run by a Board which is elected by the membership of Liberal Reform and two co-Chairs who are chosen from within the Board itself. In addition Liberal Reform has an Advisory Council which consists of a broad group of campaigners and policy experts to advise the elected Board and help ensure a broad Liberal heritage is represented in the party.

=== Liberal Reform Board ===
In alphabetical order, from left to right, the current Board comprises:

Co-Chairs
Fraser Coppin	Alan Muhammed

Board Members
Guy Benson	Harry Compson	Fraser Coppin
Oliver Jones-Lyons	Gareth Lloyd-Johnson	Simon McGrath
Callum Robertson	Emily Tester	Stuart Wheatcroft

=== Liberal Reform Advisory Council ===
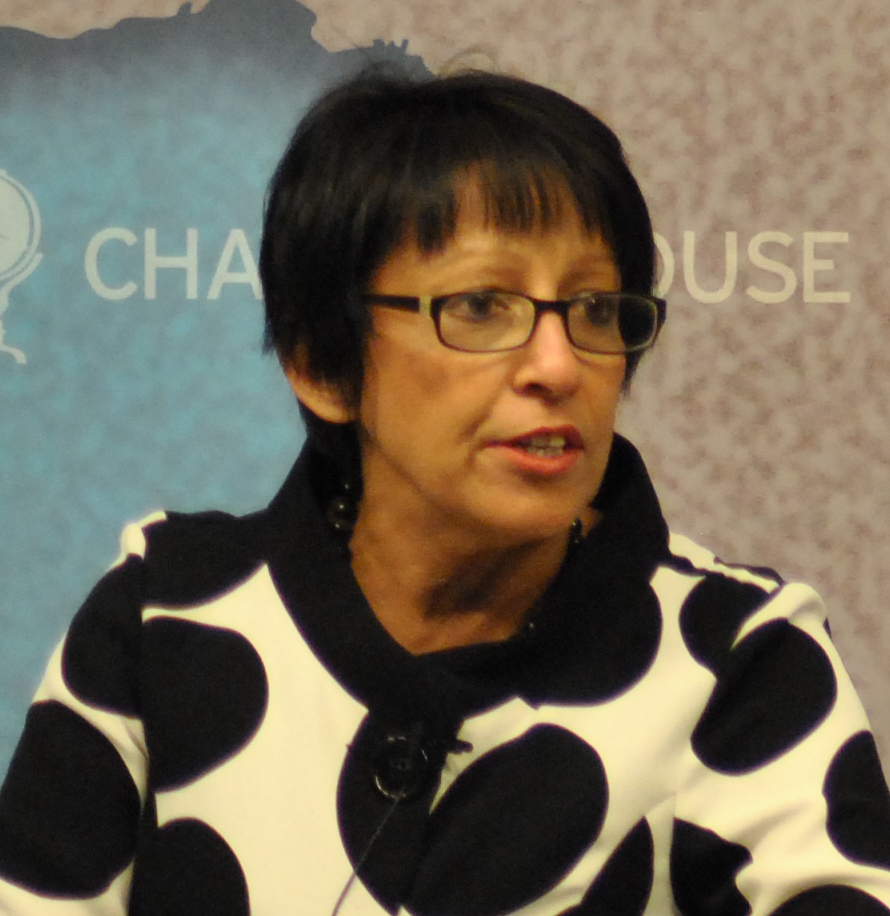
Kishwer Falkner is an Advisory Council member and senior member of the House of Lords.

The following prominent Liberal Democrats are members of the Liberal Reform Advisory Council:

- Julian Astle, former Special Adviser the Deputy PM Nick Clegg
- Jeremy Browne, Former Liberal Democrat MP for Taunton Deane and Minister of State at the Foreign Office
- Kishwer Falkner, Baroness Falkner of Margravine, an International Development and Foreign Policy expert
- Norman Lamb, MP for North Norfolk and former Health Minister
- David Laws, former MP for Yeovil and Minister of State at the Department for Education
- Jenny Randerson, Baroness Randerson, former Deputy First Minister of Wales, Welsh Assembly Member and Minister of State for Wales in the House of Lords .

== Publications ==
Liberal Reform's 2013 publication, Coalition and Beyond: Liberal reforms for the decade ahead, includes a foreword by former party leader Nick Clegg, with chapters by former Care Minister Norman Lamb, former Northern Ireland spokesman Stephen Lloyd and Communities Minister Stephen Williams. In 2016 Liberal Reform published The Sharing Economy, featuring a foreword by Vince Cable, which argued that disruptive technologies such as Uber should broadly be welcomed, and attempts to regulate these technologies should reflect the opportunities they present to increasing individual liberty.

== See also ==
- Liberal Democrat Conference
- Social Liberal Forum
- Social Market Foundation
- Young Liberals
