= Social Liberal Forum =

- Chair: Cllr Iain Brodie-Browne
- Director: Dr Ian Kearns
- Founded: 2009
- Ideology: Social liberalism Progressivism
- Political position: Centre-left

Website
- Social Liberal Forum

The Social Liberal Forum (often abbreviated to SLF) is a pressure group and think tank which seeks to promote social liberalism within Britain. The Social Liberal Forum originated as a group that represented the centre-left within the British Liberal Democrats, but membership is now open also to people who are not members of the Liberal Democrats but who share the SLF's values and principles; since 2018 this has included liberal progressives of all parties and none. The SLF regularly organises Fringe events at the twice-per-year Liberal Democrat Conference and, increasingly, provides speakers to events elsewhere.

== Overview ==
The SLF was launched in February 2009. The book Reinventing the State: Social Liberalism for the 21st Century has been said to be influential on the thinking of those who created the SLF. The SLF did not take a corporate position on the suitability of the Coalition Government between the Liberal Democrats and the Conservatives and campaigned for many changes to Coalition policy on issues such as NHS reforms, economic policy and cuts to welfare spending.

The SLF advances social liberal policies, theory and thought leadership within British politics, often in opposition to free market fundamentalism. It takes inspiration from the political ideas of William Beveridge, John Maynard Keynes, Thomas Hill Green, Leonard Trelawny Hobhouse, David Lloyd George, Jo Grimond and Charles Kennedy amongst others. The SLF has supported a wide range of socio-economic policies including the introduction of a universal basic income, opposition to welfare reforms and support for wealth taxation, economic democracy and Keynesian economics.

== Conference and Lecture ==
Every July since 2011, the SLF has held a one-day annual conference; and since 2012, this includes a William Beveridge Memorial Lecture.

=== William Beveridge Memorial Lectures ===
Number	Year	Speaker	Title
1st	2012	Nick Clegg MP	Pollution, the sixth giant evil
2nd	2013	Steve Webb MP	Something for something
3rd	2014	Tim Farron MP	Ambitious government, to improve the lives of citizens
4th	2015	Baroness Claire Tyler	Wellbeing - a modern take on Beveridge
5th	2016	Sir Vince Cable MP	The fragmentation of the centre-left
6th	2017	Lord William Wallace	Is a liberal and democratic society compatible with globalisation?
7th	2018	Layla Moran MP	A new liberal approach to education - challenging the broken status quo
8th	2019	Sir Ed Davey MP	Climate justice: how to decarbonise capitalism and tackle poverty
9th	2020	Clive Lewis MP	Social Liberalism in the 21st Century
10th	2021	Prof David Howarth	Liberal Equality

== Publications ==
On 9 March 2018, the Social Liberal Forum published a book, edited by Helen Flynn, entitled "Four Go In Search of Big Ideas: Putting Progressive Ideas at the Heart of UK Politics". The book included chapters from a range of social liberal, social democratic and green political thinkers and aimed to build a "progressive alliance of people, ideas and campaigns". The book covered three main policy areas (the economy, welfare and climate change) and included contributions from active members of the Liberal Democrats and the Labour Party. The Forum regularly publishes pamphlets written by members relevant to social liberal thought and action.

=== Books ===
==== Pre-SLF and non-SLF books by social liberals ====
Much of the debate and organisation of the Social Liberal Forum emerged from the following book, published in 2007, which was framed as a response and antidote to The Orange Book:

- Duncan Brack, Richard S. Grayson and David Howarth (eds), Reinventing the State: Social Liberalism for the 21st Century (Politico's, London, September 2007). 400pp.

It was subsequently reprinted by Politico's in 2009, to tie in with the launch of the SLF.

Another book, published in 2012, subjected The Orange Book to further scrutiny, challenging its emphasis on economic liberalism and rejecting its preponderant support for market solutions:

- Robert Brown and Nigel Lindsay (eds), The Little Yellow Book: Reclaiming the Liberal Democrats for the People (Fastprint Publishing, Peterborough, February 2012). 179pp.

A new book, published in April 2023, with a paperback version which came out in April 2024, envisions a new form of egalitarian liberalism that focuses on the need for a fairer and more equitable society:

- Daniel Chandler, Free and Equal: What Would a Fair Society Look Like? (Allen Lane Publishing, London, April 2023). 416pp.

==== SLF books ====
- Helen Flynn (ed.), Four Go in Search of Big Ideas: Putting Progressive Ideas at the Heart of UK Politics (Social Liberal Forum, London, March 2018). 205pp.
- Paul Hindley and Gordon Lishman (eds), The Wolves in the Forest: Tackling Inequality in the 21st Century (Social Liberal Forum, London, September 2019). 143pp.

=== Pamphlets ===
==== General pamphlets ====
- Prateek Buch (foreword by Will Hutton), Plan C — Social Liberal Approaches to a Fair, Sustainable Economy (Social Liberal Forum, London, March 2012), 38pp.
- David Hall-Matthews and Prateek Buch, Liberal Democrat Party Policy-Making in Coalition (Social Liberal Forum, London, September 2012), 22pp.
- Helen Flynn, Developing a Coherent, Progressive and Sustainable Education Policy (Social Liberal Forum, London, September 2013), 14pp.
- Vince Cable, Inequality: A Speech Given by Sir Vince Cable MP at the Resolution Foundation, 6th September 2017 (Social Liberal Forum, London, September 2017). 12pp.
- Jon Alexander and Ian Kearns, Winning for Britain: Rebuilding the Liberal Democrats to change the course of our country (Social Liberal Forum, London, September 2020). 36pp.
- ________________________, Citizens' Britain: A Radical Agenda for the 2020s (Social Liberal Forum, London, December 2020). 21pp.

==== SLF 'Long Reads' series ====
- Lewis Baston and Seth Thévoz, Lib Dem Seats in 2010-5: Where Did the Votes Go? SLF Long Reads Number 1 (London: Social Liberal Forum, July 2015), 22pp.
- Simon Radford, Shouldn't We Listen to Those Who Predicted the Crash? SLF Long Reads Number 2 (London: Social Liberal Forum, August 2015), 12pp.
- Seth Thévoz, Electing the Lords: How Did That Work Out for the Lib Dems? A Study into the Effectiveness of the Interim Peers Panel System for Electing Liberal Democrat Nominees to the House of Lords, 1999-2015. SLF Long Reads Number 3 (London: Social Liberal Forum, September 2015), 28pp.
- Paul Pettinger, Why Centrism Doesn't Work for Minor Parties. SLF Long Reads Number 4 (London: Social Liberal Forum, April 2016), 18pp.
- Edward Robinson, The European Carbon Market isn't Working — and Social Liberals Should be Worried. SLF Long Reads Number 5 (London: Social Liberal Forum, February 2017), 10pp.
- Seth Thévoz, The Richmond Park By-Election in Perspective: Lessons from Liberal, Social Democrat and Liberal Democrat By-Election Gains. SLF Long Reads Number 6 (London: Social Liberal Forum, February 2017), 28pp.
- Michael Mullaney, Northern Discomfort: An Analysis of the Liberal Democrat Performance in the 2017 General Election. SLF Long Reads Number 7 (London: Social Liberal Forum, June 2017), 10pp.
- Tom Holden, Universal Basic Income as a Tool for Tax and Benefit Reform. SLF Long Reads Number 8 (London: Social Liberal Forum, August 2017), 14pp.
- Paul Pettinger, The Progressive Alliance: Why the Liberal Democrats Need It — Revised Edition. SLF Long Reads Number 9 (London: Social Liberal Forum, September 2017), 20pp.
- Nigel Lindsay, The EU and the UK: The Liberal Case for Territorial Differentiation. SLF Long Reads Number 10 (London: Social Liberal Forum, March 2018), 8pp.

==== SLF 'Revisiting Texts' series ====
- John Maynard Keynes and Ian Kearns, Keynes and Kernes: Am I A Liberal? (Social Liberal Forum, London, March 2019). 36pp.

== People ==
The current Chair of the Social Liberal Forum is Cllr Iain Brodie-Browne and Deputy-Chair Louise Harris. Previous Chairs of the SLF have included Helen Flynn, Naomi Smith, Gareth Epps, David Hall-Matthews and Richard Grayson.

== See also ==
- Liberal Democrat Conference
- Liberal Reform
- Social Market Foundation
- Young Liberals
