= Liberal Democrat Conference =

Biannual British political party conference

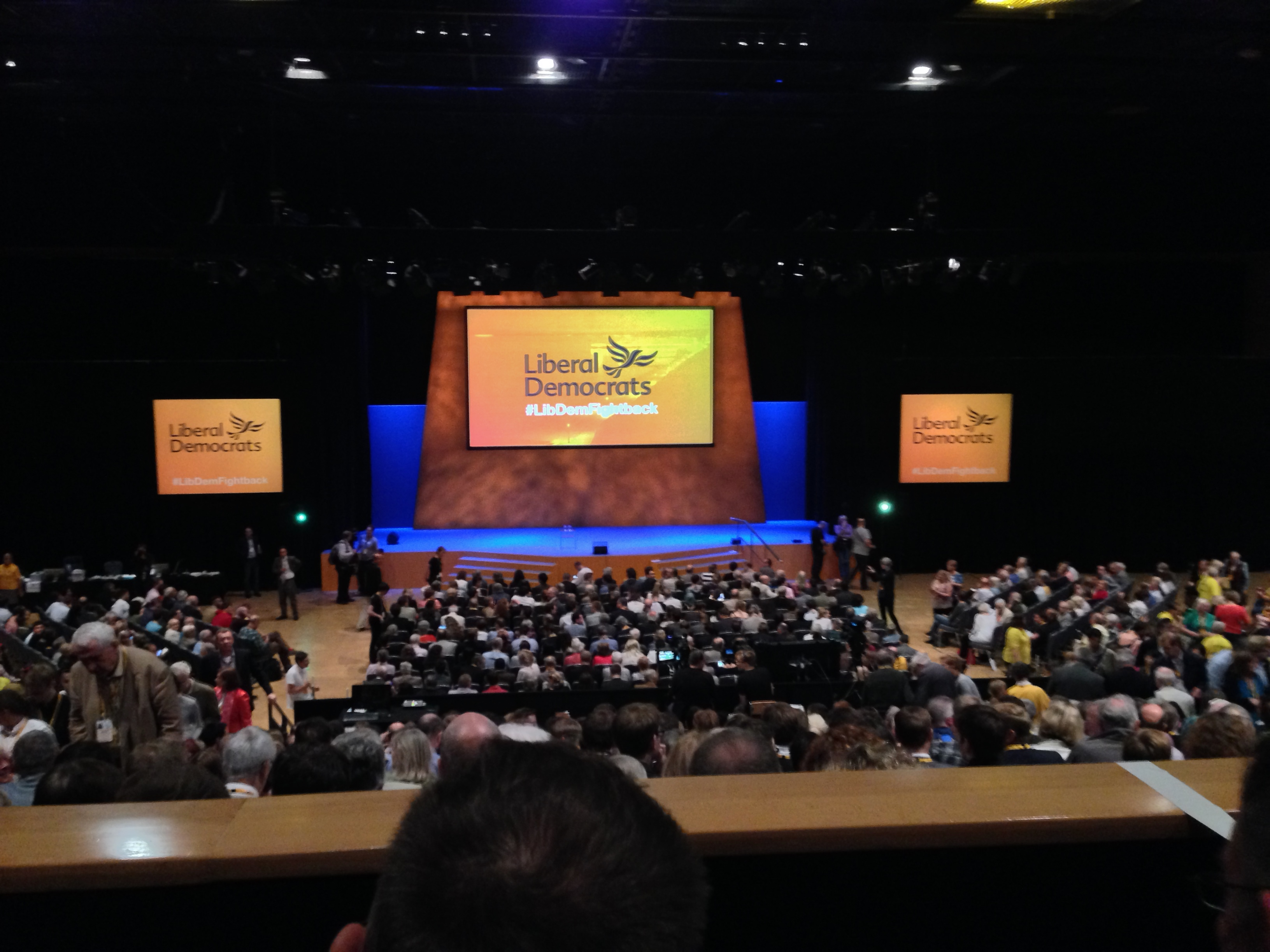
- September 2015 Lib Dem Conference, at BIC Bournemouth
- Formation: 2 March 1988 (on creation of the Liberal Democrats)
- Location(s): Recent years: York Brighton Bournemouth Spring Conference 2025: Harrogate Autumn Conference 2025: Bournemouth (From Spring 2020 — Spring 2022 inclusive, conferences were held online, due to the COVID-19 pandemic)
- Board of directors: Federal Conference Committee
- Key people: Nick da Costa (Chair); Chris Adams & Eleanor Kelly (Vice Chairs); Ed Davey (party leader); Daisy Cooper (deputy party leader)
- Parent organization: Liberal Democrats
- Website: Liberal Democrat Conference

The Liberal Democrat Conference, also known inside the party as the Liberal Democrat Federal Conference, is a twice-per-year political conference of the British Liberal Democrats, the third-largest political party in the UK by the number of seats in the House of Commons, and the fourth largest by popular vote following the 2024 general election. The Conference is typically held over three days in the spring and four in the autumn, during the party conference season, at a variety of venues. (Due to COVID-19, the Conference was primarily an online event between spring 2020 and spring 2022 inclusive). It culminates in a speech by the party's Leader.

The Liberal Democrat Conference is organised by the Federal Conference Committee, an internal body of the Liberal Democrats. Conference is the ultimate decision-making body of the Liberal Democrats, one of the few British political parties to use its annual gathering for voting and policy resolution.

== All-member Conference voting system ==
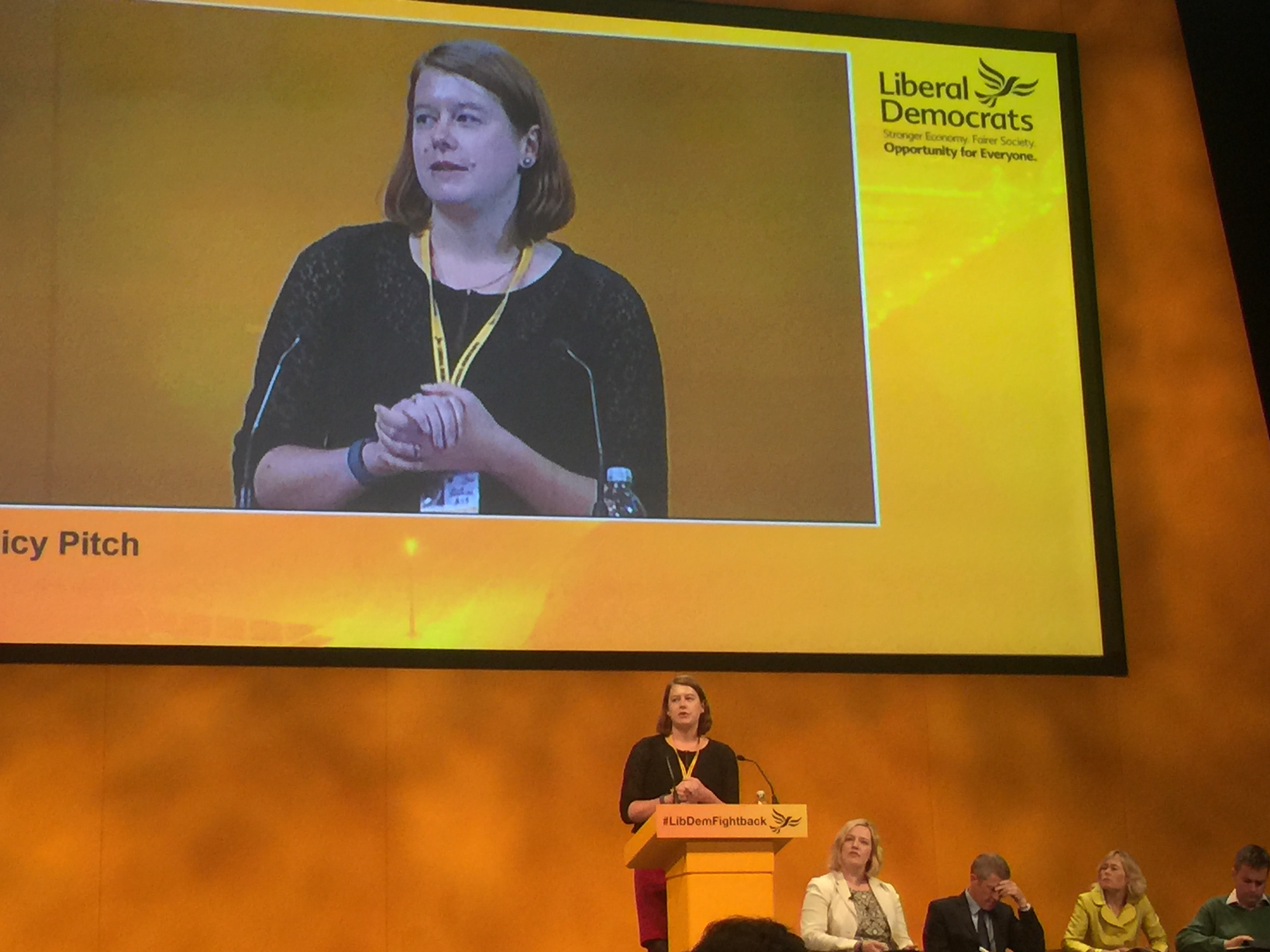
Delegate addresses party members in the main Conference Hall, during a policy debate

In contrast to the annual Labour Party Conference, where 50% of votes are allocated to affiliated organisations (such as affiliated trade unions), and in which all voting is restricted to nominated representatives (known as delegates), who must be physically present in the main Conference Hall, and the annual Conservative Party Conference, where votes are traditionally not held, every member of the Liberal Democrats who attends its twice-per-year Conference, either in-person or online, has the right to vote in policy debates, under a one-member, one vote system.

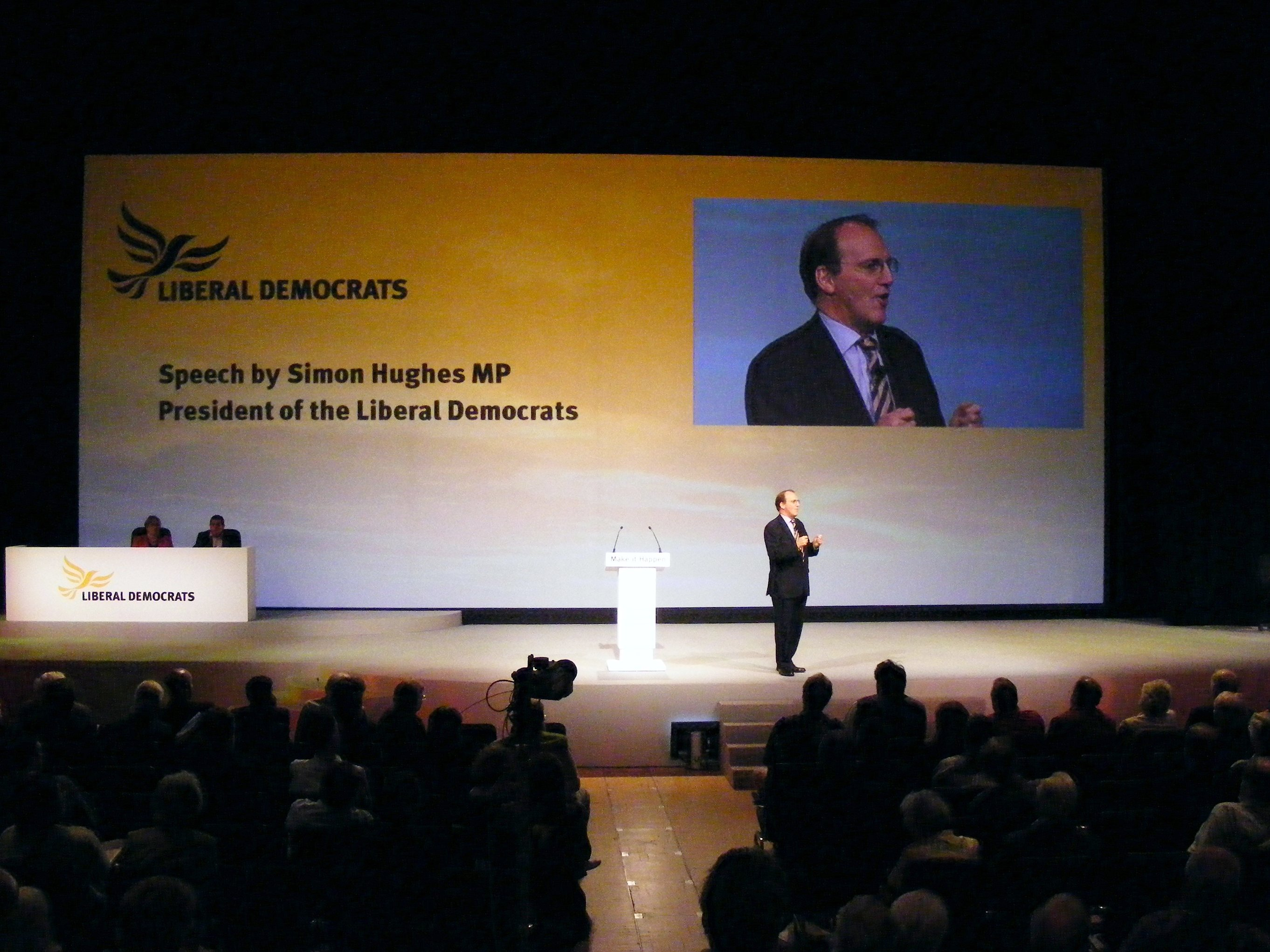
Simon Hughes, former President of the Liberal Democrats, addresses members in the main Conference Hall

There are no "weighted" votes reserved for the party's Elected Representatives, MPs, trade unions or for senior members of the party. A proposal can only become policy if Conference votes for it.

== Conference Fringe ==
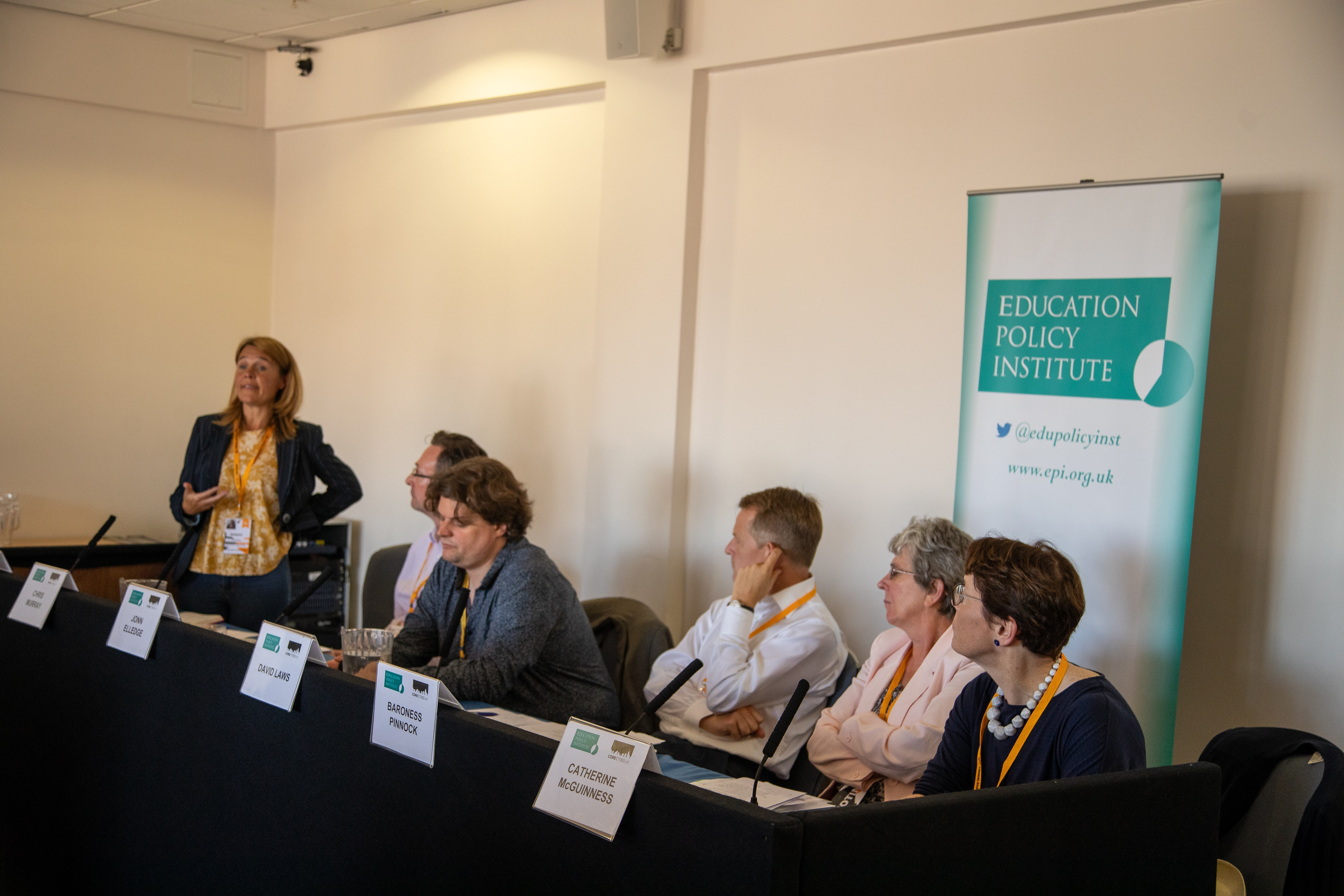
A Conference Fringe event, organised by the Education Policy Institute

There are many types of Fringe events, consisting of workshops, debates and seminars, many of which are run by external organisations. Events held by the party's internal political groups, such as Liberal Reform, Social Liberal Forum and Young Liberals, are also a regular feature of the Fringe. There is also a well-established late-evening entertainment review, known as the Glee Club.

== Conference Access Fund ==
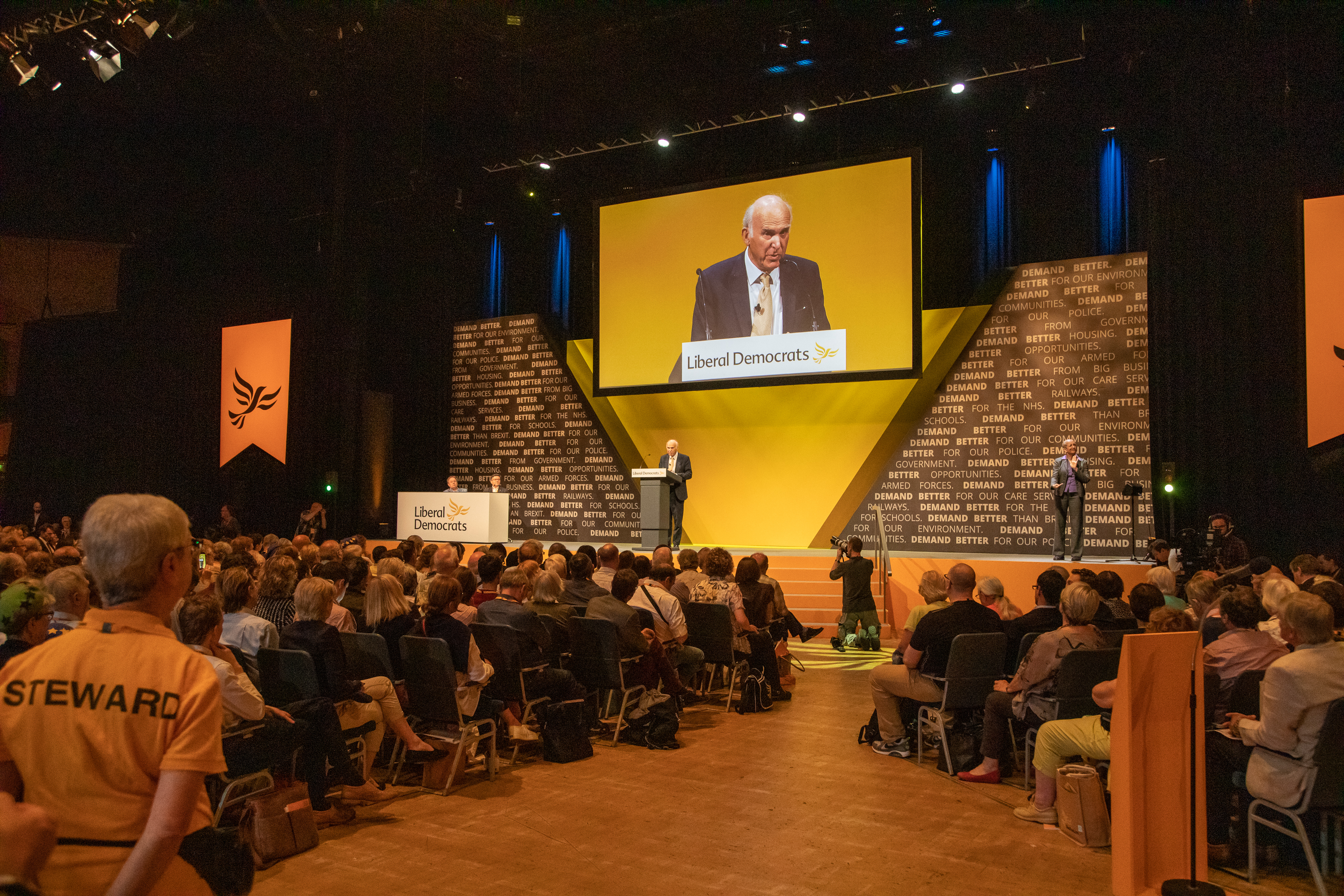
Wheelchair-accessible spaces and staff support enable disabled attendees to access the Conference floor

Among the three largest UK-wide parties, the Liberal Democrats are unique in providing a Conference Access Fund that defrays costs for low-income and disabled Conference attendees.

The Fund offsets the costs of accommodation, childcare and travel for those on low incomes. For example, it provides £50 per night accommodation support on the understanding that the cheapest-available accommodation has been booked. It provides uncapped funding for disabled attendees. Members of the party directly contribute to the fund and are described as having donated "with generosity". The funding is ring-fenced.

== Conference locations ==
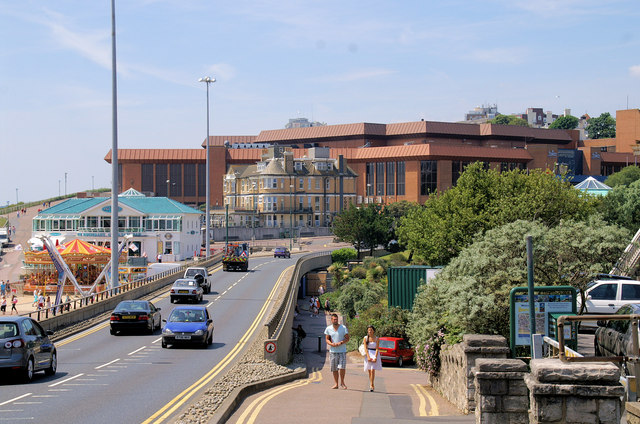
Bournemouth International Centre is a regular location for the Conference

Conference is held twice per year, in Spring (usually March) and Autumn (September or early October). It is held in locations across England, Wales and Scotland, with Bournemouth and York being the most frequently used locations in recent years. The duration is usually three to four days. The party's first Conference was held in Blackpool, in September 1988. All locations are accessible on public transport, by rail and road.

== Conference processes ==
The Liberal Democrat Conference is overseen by the Federal Conference Committee (FCC), which also selects motions and amendments for debates, runs Conference sessions and provides drafting advice and liaison. Its members are regularly elected and expected to be objective and fair in their selection of motions and amendments.

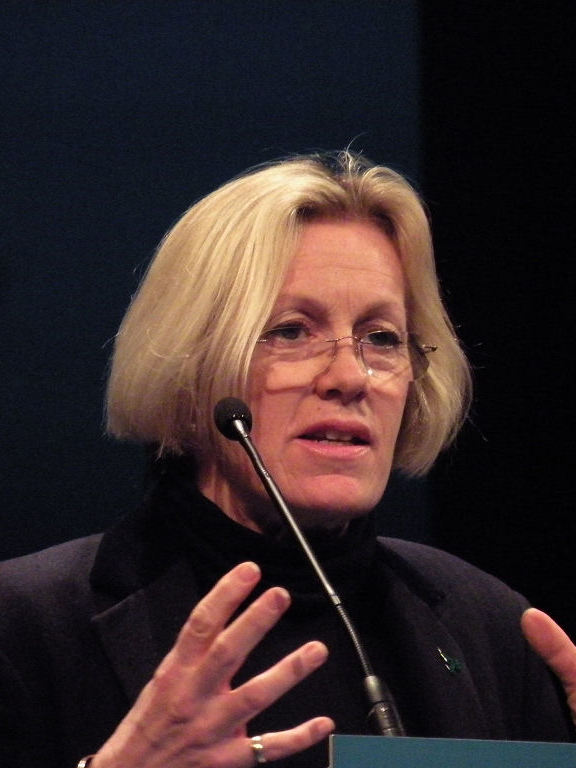
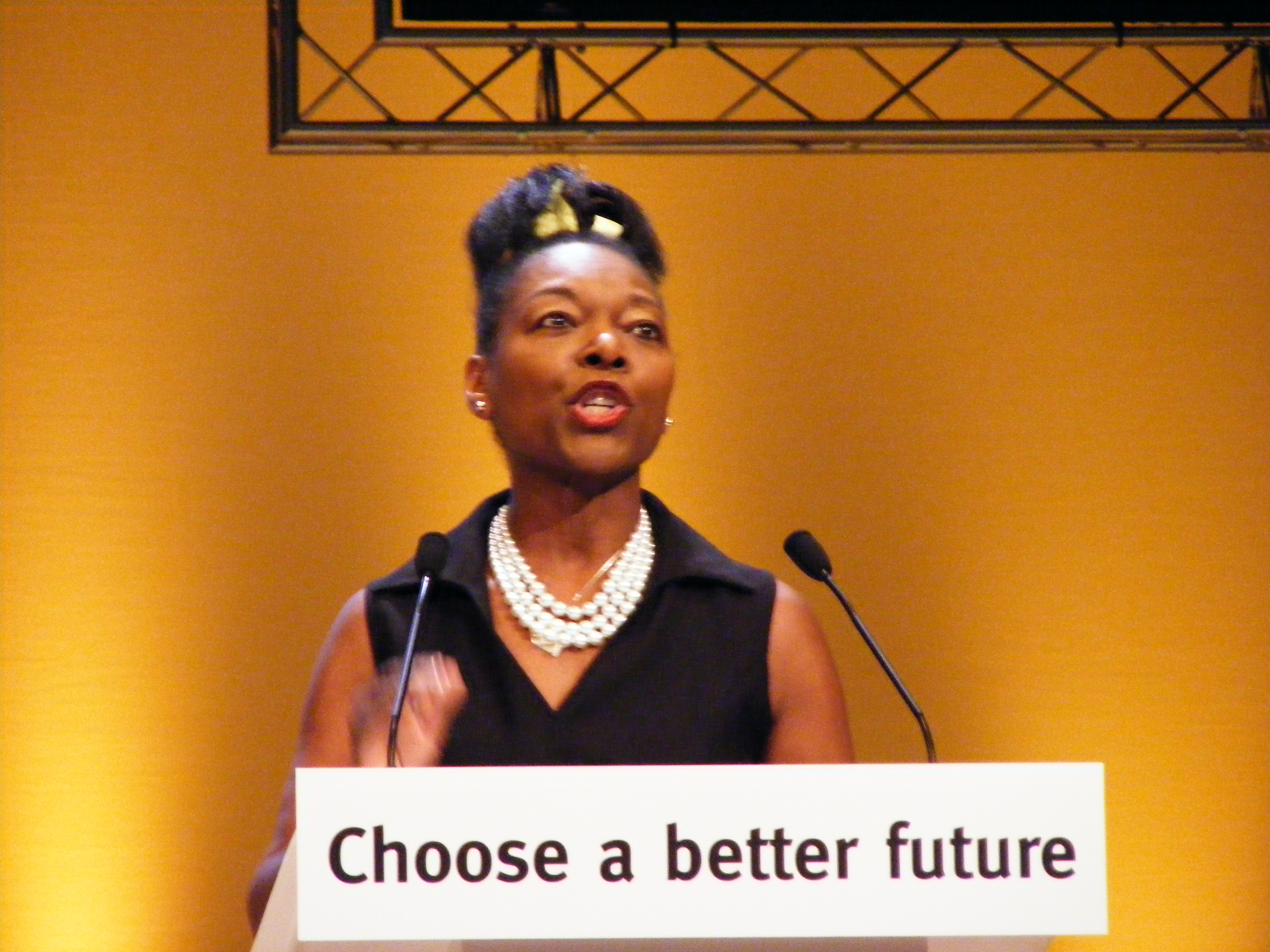
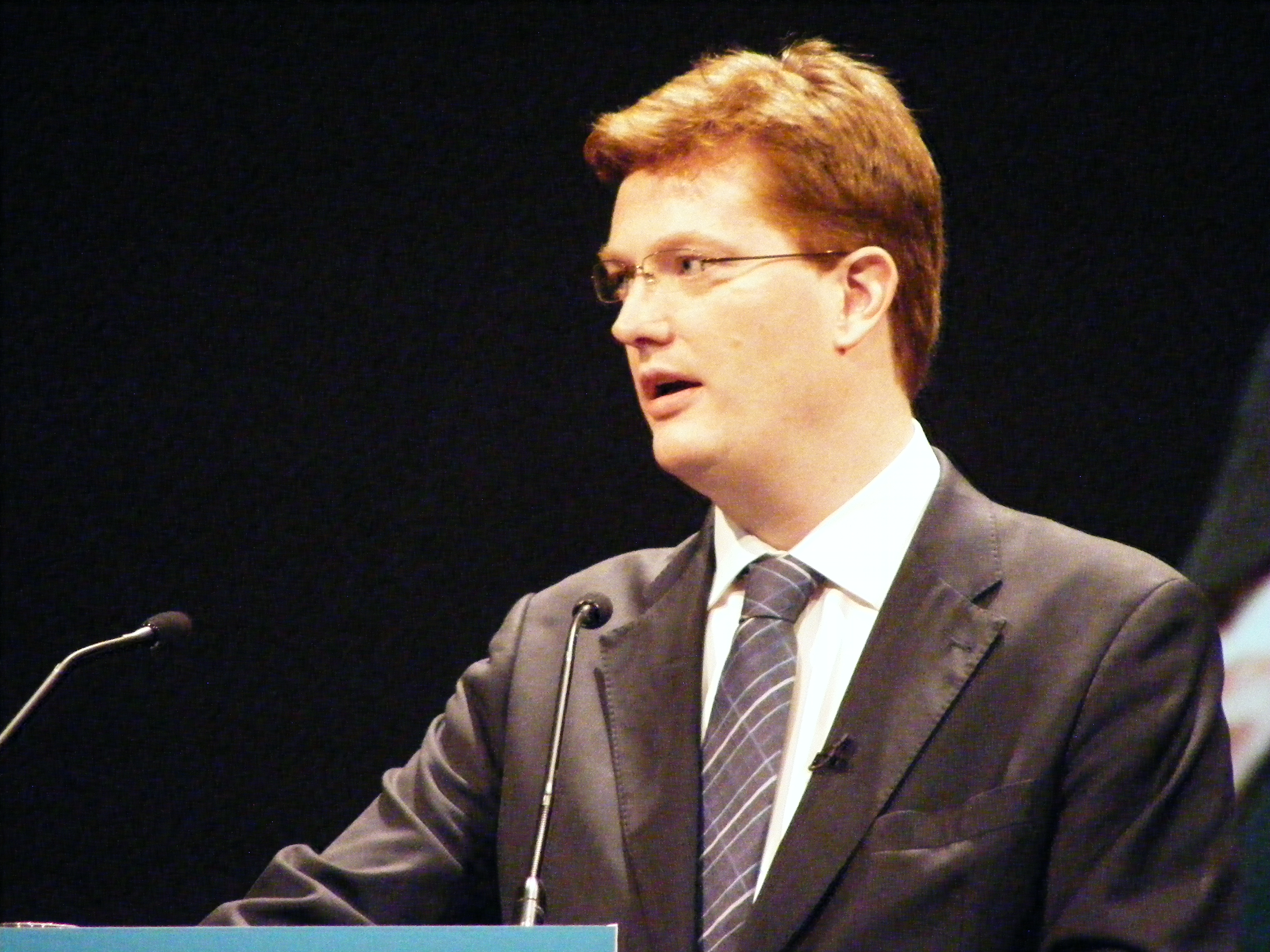
From left, Tessa Munt, Lib Dem peer Floella Benjamin and Danny Alexander address the Lib Dem Conference

The Liberal Democrat Conference does not choose the Leader of the Liberal Democrats, who is instead elected by a party-wide ballot of all members in a one member, one vote contest. The system has been in use since the party's inception in 1988, which predates changes to internal party voting rules by both the Labour and the Conservative parties. Neither Liberal Democrat MPs nor any other internal party groups have special voting rights over either party policy or in the election of the party Leader.

== Overview ==
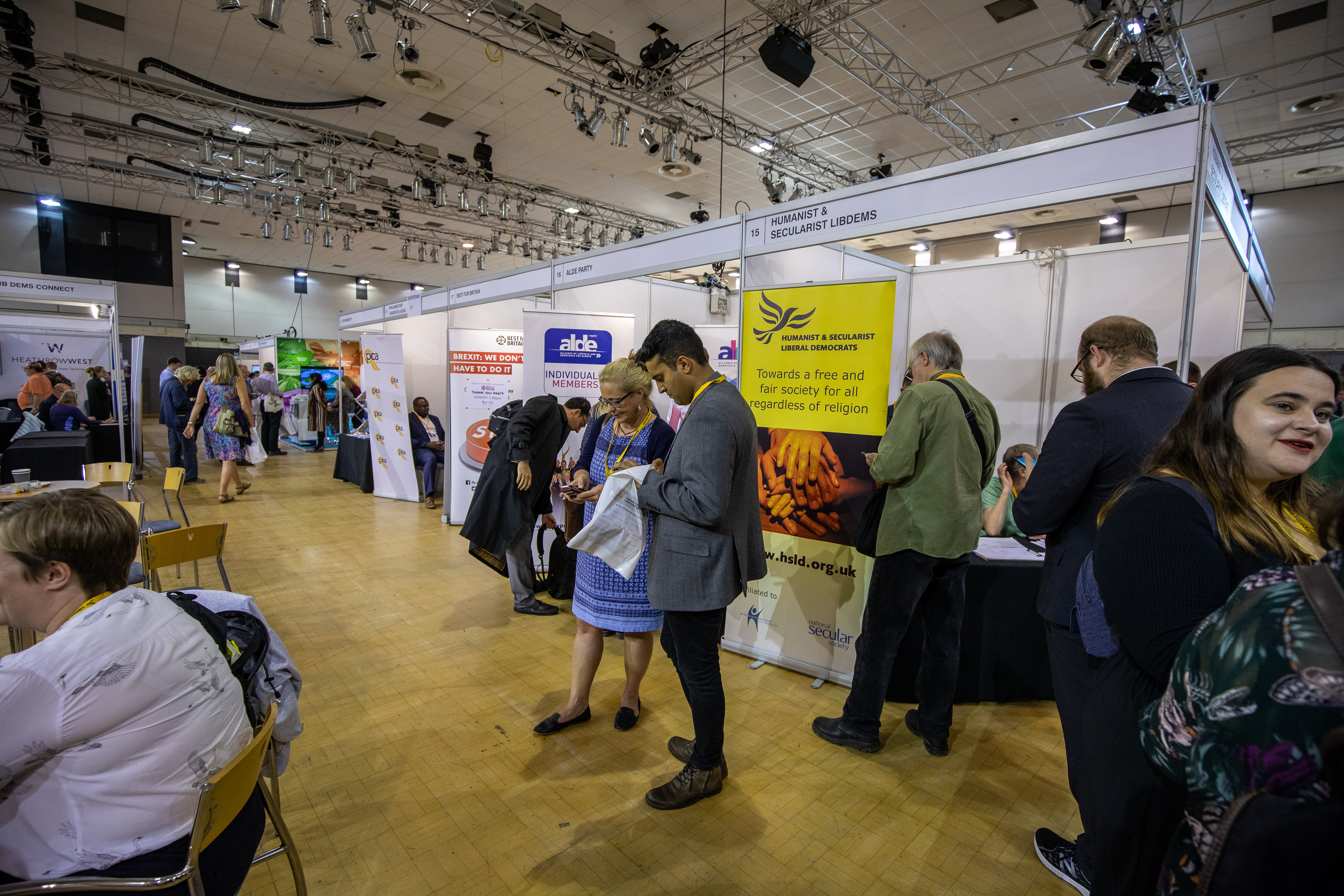
Stands at the Conference Exhibition Hall in 2019

The Liberal Democrat Conference takes place twice per year, first as the Spring Conference, usually held in March, and then the Autumn Conference, usually in September.

The first Liberal Democrat Conference was held in Blackpool, in the North West of England, from 25 to 29 September 1988, with the most recent being the 72nd Conference, from 14 to 17 September 2024, the first to be held since the party won a historic 72 seats, the highest number in the party's 36-year history.

The party held no in-person conferences after Autumn 2019, until Spring 2023, due to the COVID-19 pandemic, and the funeral of Queen Elizabeth II on 19 September 2022, on which date the first in-person Autumn Conference was due to resume.

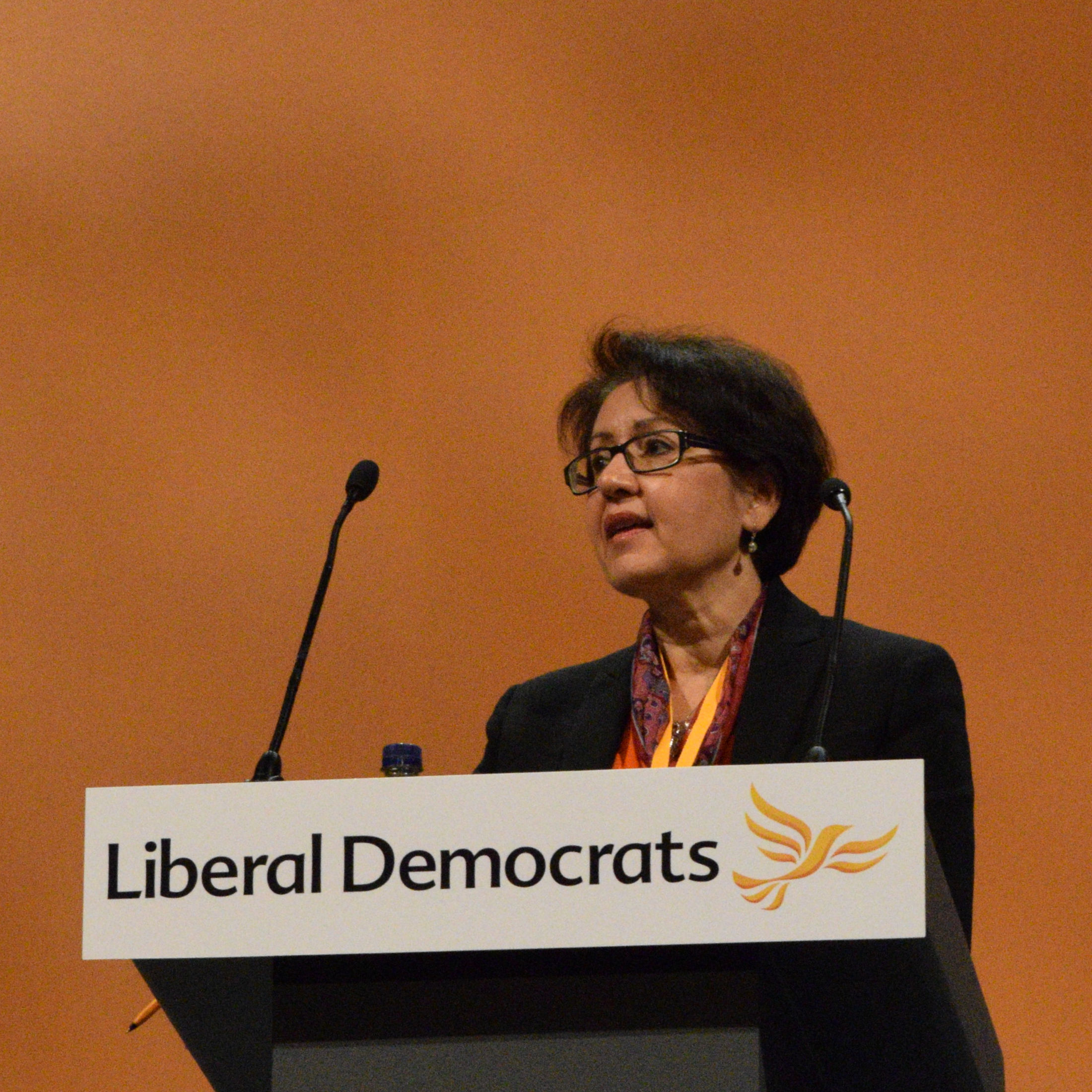
Lib Dem peer Shas Sheehan addressing members in a 2017 environment speech

In autumn 2020, the same pandemic caused all three of Britain's largest political parties to hold 'virtual' conferences. During that period, the Liberal Democrats were the only one of the three to hold policy votes at its Conference: the Conservatives traditionally do not hold votes at their Conference, while Labour replaced its Conference with an event titled Labour Connected, at which no votes were held. The Liberal Democrats used electronic cards to enable party members to vote online.

== Motions ==
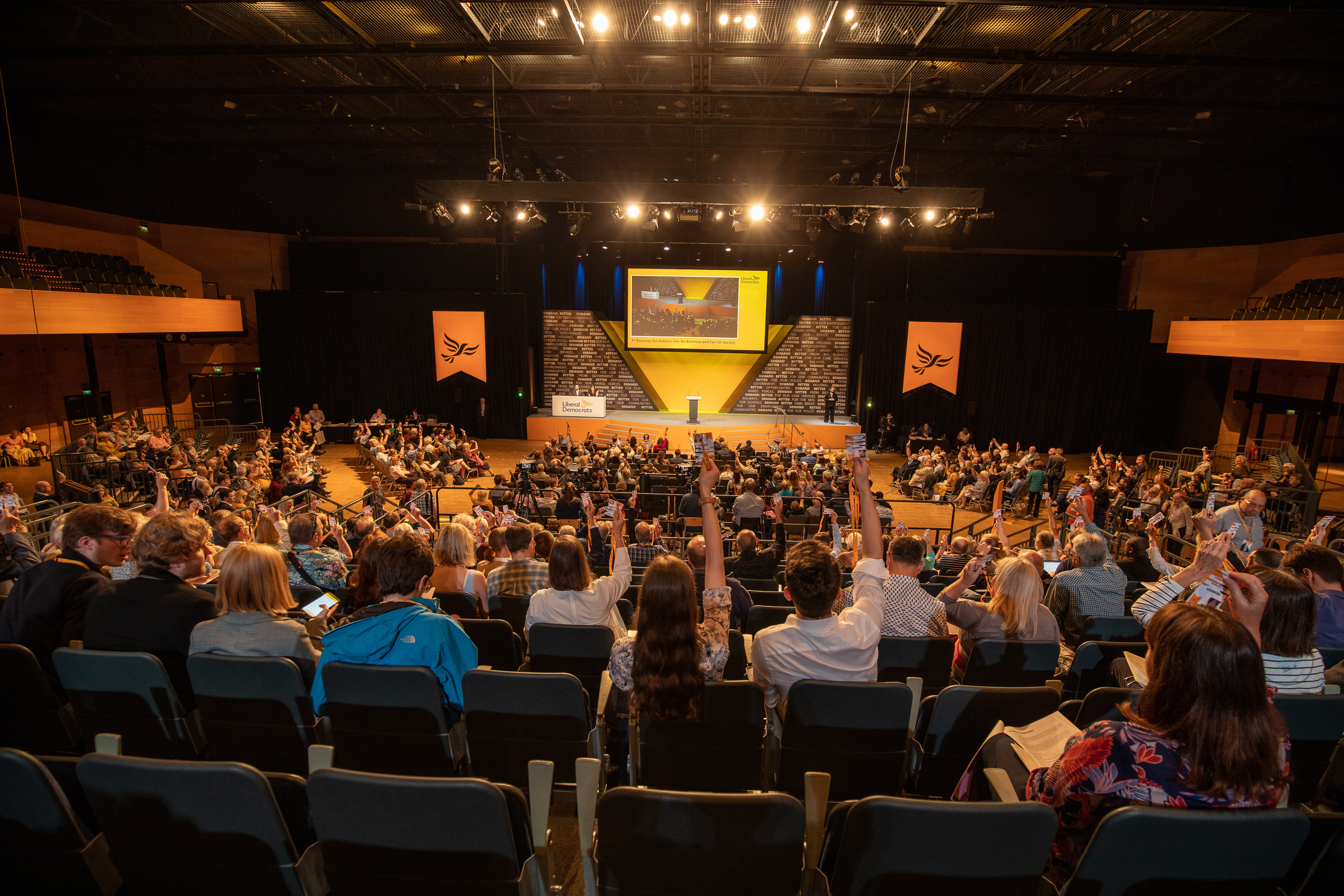
Party members at the Conference voting on a Motion by raising their party cards

A Motion is put forward before each debate, and must be submitted to the party's Federal Conference Committee at least eight weeks before Conference. These are then published in the Conference Agenda.

Any party member can submit a motion, with the support of at least 10 local party members, a local party, Federal Policy Committee or an Associated Organisation (AO). Any party member can also speak either for or against a Motion. The debate ends with a vote, open to all members at Conference. If a Motion is passed, it automatically becomes Lib Dem policy. Emergency Motions can be submitted until a few days before the start of Conference.

== Federal Conference Committee ==
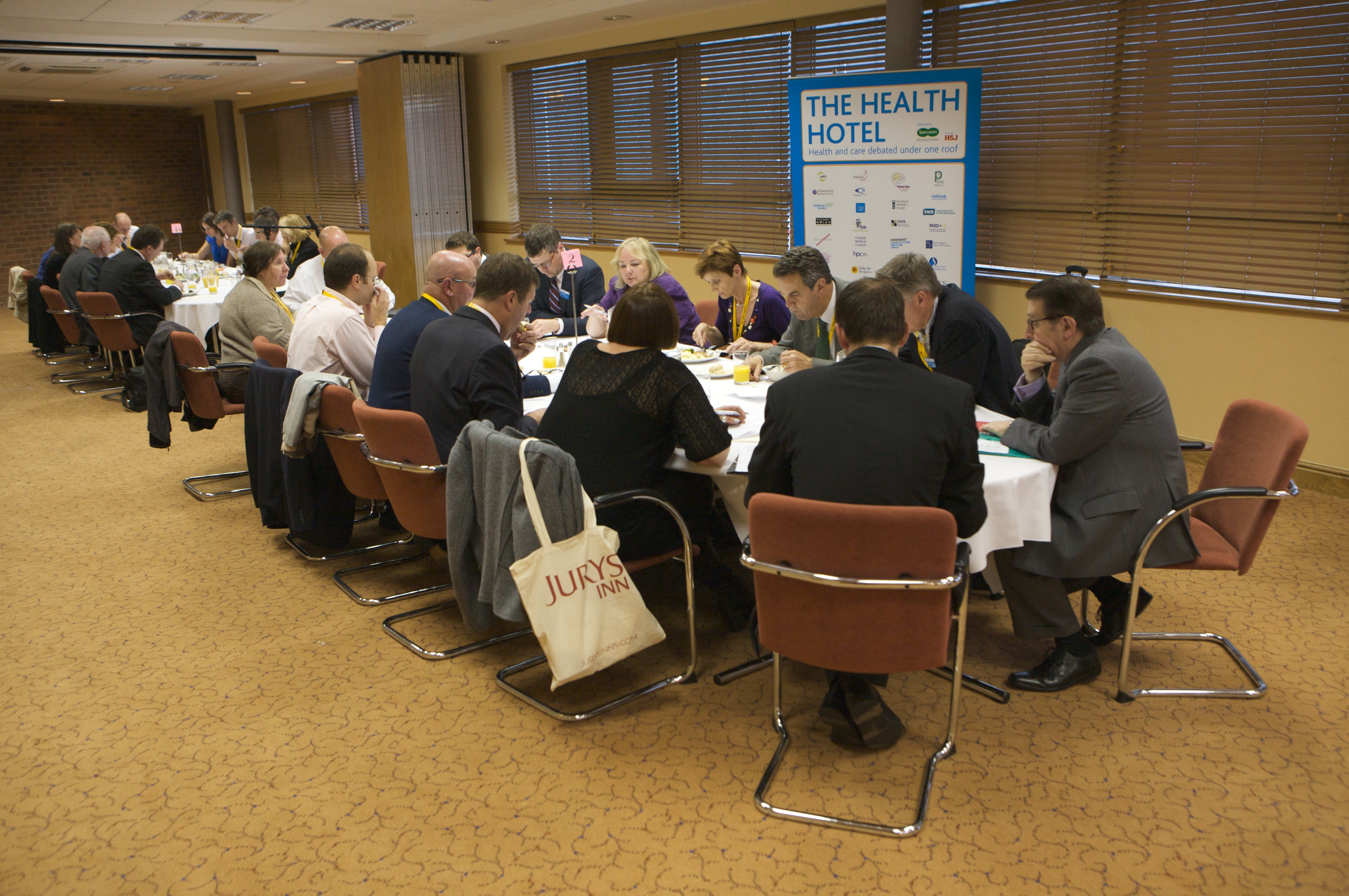
Party consultation with Conference attendees in Liverpool

The Liberal Democrat conference agenda is decided by the Federal Conference Committee, a democratically elected body of party members and officials. The current membership, in first name order (other than the chair and Vice Chair), after the most recent set of elections, in November 2025, is:

- Cllr Nick da Costa (Chair)
- Chris Adams (Vice Chair)
- Eleanor Kelly (Vice Chair)
- Alison Jenner
- Cllr Callum Robertson
- Chris Maines
- Cllr Gareth Epps
- Jennie Rigg
- Jess Brown-Fuller MP
- Baroness Kath Pinnock
- Sarah Teather
- Shaffaq Mohammed
- Wendy Chamberlain MP (Chief Whip)
- Dionne Daniel (English Representative)
- Paul McGarry (Scottish Representative)
- Chloe Hutchinson (Welsh Representative)
- Cllr Hannah Kitching (Federal Board Representative)
- Alex Brewer MP (FPC Representative)
- Duncan Brack (FPC Representative)
- Mark Pack (FCEC Representative)
- Charley Hasted (FPDC Representative)
- Lucas North (Young Liberals Representative)

== Federal Policy Committee ==
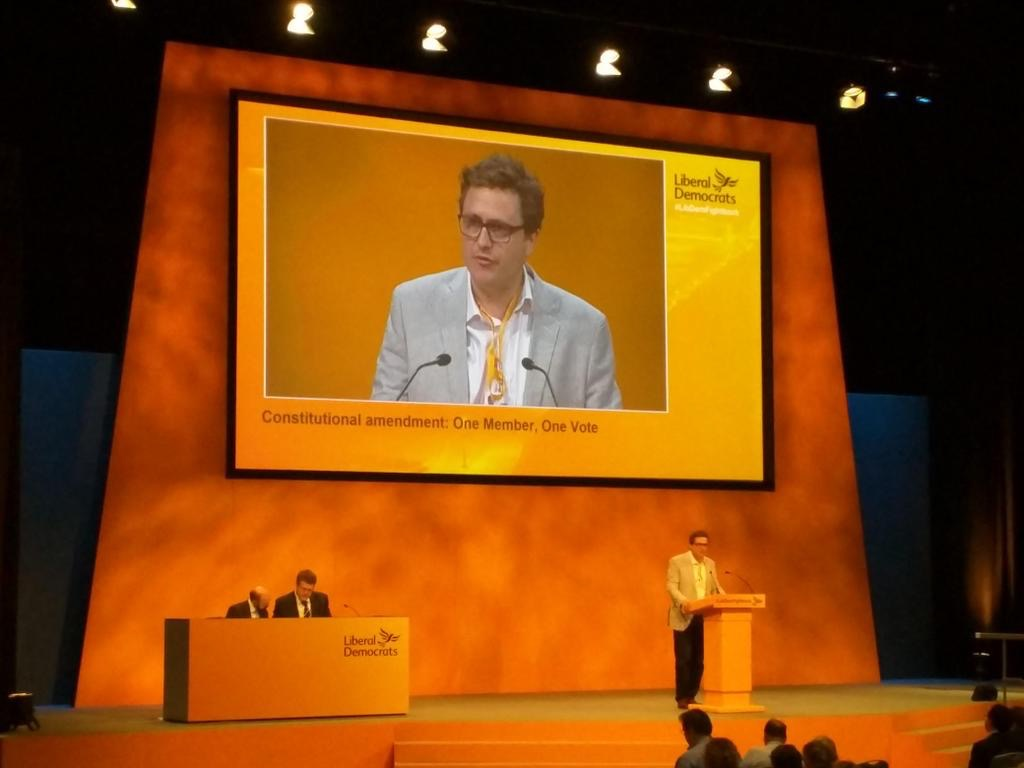
A debate speech on widening the party's one member, one vote system

The Federal Policy Committee researches and develops party policy and oversees its policy-making process. At Conference, it provides policy papers for debate and compiles the election manifestos for Westminster elections.

The current membership after the most recent set of elections, which were held in November 2025, is:

- Ed Davey MP (Chair)
- Cllr Lucy Nethsingha (Vice Chair)
- Dr Mohsin Khan (Vice Chair)
- Helen Morgan MP (Parliamentary Vice Chair)
- Josh Babarinde MP (Party President)
- Abrial Jerram
- Cllr Antony Hook
- Duncan Brack
- Josh Matthews
- Cllr Katie Mansfield
- Cllr Laura Gordon
- Cllr Martin Horwood
- Nick Harvey
- Phil Bennion
- Rebecca Jones
- Rosie Shimell
- Cllr Simon McGrath
- Zoe Hollowood
- Alex Brewer MP (Parliamentary Rep)
- Chris Coghlan MP (Parliamentary Rep)
- Joshua Reynolds MP (Parliamentary Rep)
- Steff Aquarone MP (Parliamentary Rep)
- Lord Robin Teverson (Parliamentary Rep)
- Cllr Susan Juned (Councillor Rep)
- Cllr Thalia Marrington (Councillor Rep)
- Jeremy Hargreaves (FCEC Rep)
- Richard Cole (English Rep)
- Daniel Khan-O'Malley (Scottish Rep)
- Alec Dauncey (Welsh Rep)
- Mackenzie Gregory (YL Rep)

== List of Liberal Democrat Conferences (1988—present) ==
Date	Location	Party President	Speeches and Motions
25—29 September 1988	Blackpool	Ian Wrigglesworth	The first Leader of the Liberal Democrats, Paddy Ashdown. He led the party from 1988 to 1999. Following a vote at the Liberal Assembly on 17 September 1987, and a Liberal Party Special Conference on 23 January 1988, the Liberal Party agreed to seek merger with the Social Democratic Party (SDP). A ballot of both parties' members was counted on 2 March 1988, with 65,098 voting in favour and 16,294 against. Following the merger, the new party is known as the Social and Liberal Democrats. The Social and Liberal Democrats Leadership Election is held, in which Paddy Ashdown is declared Leader. The newly created party holds its first Conference, known as the SLD Conference, with its members referring to their party as "the Democrats". In Ashdown's first speech as leader, entitled The Path Ahead, he says that he sees a "very exciting journey" ahead, and that the Labour Party, which has faced three consecutive general election defeats, could be replaced by the SLD.
3—5; March; 1989	Bournemouth	Ian Wrigglesworth	
9—15; September; 1989	Brighton	Ian Wrigglesworth	The Federal Conference votes for a party-wide members' ballot to change the party's name to the Liberal Democrats. The members vote for the change, and the result is announced on 16 October 1989.
10—11; March; 1990	Cardiff	Charles Kennedy	
15—20; September; 1990	Blackpool	Charles Kennedy	
15—17; March; 1991	Nottingham	Charles Kennedy	
9—12; September; 1991	Bournemouth	Charles Kennedy	
7—8; March; 1992	Glasgow	Charles Kennedy	In the last Federal Conference before the 1992 General Election, amid much media speculation about the possibility of the forthcoming election resulting in a hung parliament, Paddy Ashdown tells party members: "This could be a different sort of election. It could be an election where we don't just change the leaders, we can change the quality of leadership as well. Where we don't just change our government, but change our system of government as well. Where we don't just pass a verdict on the past, but where we set a new course for our country's future as well".
13—17; September; 1992	Harrogate	Charles Kennedy	
29—31; May; 1993	Nottingham	Charles Kennedy	
19—23; September; 1993	Torquay	Charles Kennedy	
12—13; March; 1994	Cardiff	Robert Maclennan	
18—22; September; 1994	Brighton	Robert Maclennan	
11—12; March; 1995	Scarborough	Robert Maclennan	
17—21; September; 1995	Glasgow	Robert Maclennan	
15—17; March; 1996	Nottingham	Robert Maclennan	
22—26; September; 1996	Brighton	Robert Maclennan	
8—9; March; 1997	Cardiff	Robert Maclennan	Addressing the Federal Conference on the eve of the 1997 General Election, Paddy Ashdown tells party members: "We carry the torch of radicalism in our defence of individual liberties and progressive social policies. And in our fight to control the abuse of power and modernise our political system, we carry the torch of liberals and democrats and radicals and reformers in every generation for four hundred years who have fought the vested interests of the day, to modernise our political system, and control the power of the State. In every generation, we have been opposed by the conservatives and the reactionaries. In every generation, we have succeeded through our tenacity, through the force of our ideas, and through the strength of our cause... We have won the power to make the difference. We have proved ourselves in local government. We have proved our ability to change the agenda. To put education at the forefront of national debate. To demand open, honest taxation. To set a new style of co-operation in politics, which puts country before party where it is right and where it can make a difference. Yes - we have earned the right and the power to make a difference. We have proved our ability to win". Ashdown continues: "I want every single one of you to look back on these next fifty days and be proud: proud to have been part of this great campaign. Proud that, like Lloyd George, you went to the country with a message you believed. Proud to have said what you think needs to be done for your country. Proud to have stood out against the fatalism of British politics. Proud to have said - it does not have to be like this. Yes, it can be done. Tell them how it is. Tell them what we will do. Tell them we will be their champions. Tell them their vote can make a difference".
21—25; September; 1997	Eastbourne	Robert Maclennan	Following Labour's landslide election victory in the 1997 General Election under Tony Blair, Ashdown praises both the Party's success and the large electoral advance of the Liberal Democrats, which has more than doubled its seats in the House of Commons, from 20 to 46 seats. Adapting a phrase from Shakespeare's Macbeth, he quips: "Hubble, bubble, toil and trouble; the Tory party's reduced to rubble".
14—15; March; 1998	Southport	Diana Maddock	
20—24; September; 1998	Brighton	Diana Maddock	
5—7; March; 1999	Edinburgh	Navnit Dholakia	
19—23; September; 1999	Harrogate	Navnit Dholakia	The second Leader of the Liberal Democrats, Charles Kennedy. He led the party from 1999 to 2006. The first Federal Conference with Charles Kennedy as Leader, following the Liberal Democrats Leadership Election on 9 August 1999. The outgoing leader, Paddy Ashdown, tells the Conference that the party has been ahead of its time, and that it "rightly" talks about strategy, but that "no strategy will work, unless we have something fresh to say and offer something distinctive to vote for", and that if it fails to "think afresh", that it risks "falling into the easy trap of leftist, oppositional politics. And that," he says, "would mean making ourselves irrelevant again for a generation". The new leader, Charles Kennedy, after thanking his predecessor, emphasises that in the forthcoming year, a number of elections are to be fought, and that it is important that politicians reconnect with voters, and that if they do, people will become "as enthusiastic about parties as they are about pressure groups". He says that if they don't, "derisory turnouts will be the norm". He says that party politics can make a difference beyond voting and by "engaging in the process", and that the party must inspire "a new generation of voters", and "connect [its] values and vision to everyday life".
17—19; March; 2000	Plymouth	Navnit Dholakia	
17—21; September; 2000	Bournemouth	Navnit Dholakia	
16—18; March; 2001	Torquay	Navnit Dholakia	
23—27; September; 2001	Bournemouth	Navnit Dholakia	
8—10; March; 2002	Manchester	Navnit Dholakia	
22—26; September; 2002	Brighton	Navnit Dholakia	
14—16; March; 2003	Torquay	Navnit Dholakia	
21—25; September; 2003	Brighton	Navnit Dholakia	Party leader Charles Kennedy addresses Federal Conference and denounces the (then) Labour Government for going to war in Iraq: "No more glad, confident morning for this shop-soiled Labour government. They seek to manage, not lead; to manipulate, not tell it as it is... The soul goes out of politics. So the system itself simply has to change. I tell you this. If the British House of Commons had known then what it knows now – about the events leading up to that fateful parliamentary debate and vote on committing our forces into war in Iraq – then the outcome could and should have been fundamentally different... This is supposed to be a parliamentary democracy. What we’ve seen is a small clique driving us into a war, disregarding widespread public doubts. That is not acceptable".
19—21; March; 2004	Southport	Simon Hughes	
19—23; September; 2004	Bournemouth	Simon Hughes	
4—6; March; 2005	Harrogate	Simon Hughes	
18—22; September; 2005	Blackpool	Simon Hughes	
3—5; March; 2006	Harrogate	Simon Hughes	
15—19; September; 2006	Brighton	Simon Hughes	The third Leader of the Liberal Democrats, Menzies Campbell, following the Leadership Election. He led the party from March 2006 to December 2007. The first Federal Conference with Menzies Campbell as Leader, following the Liberal Democrats Leadership Election, on 21 March 2006. Campbell tells the Conference of the hopes dashed by Labour after a decade of rule, and continues: "After three election victories, Labour has failed. The gap between rich and poor is wider than at any point under Margaret Thatcher. We have higher taxes, but little improvement in public services. Millions of pensioners remain consigned to poverty: two thirds of them women. Hard-working families are crippled by debt. Carbon emissions are rising. And now hospital wards are closing, doctors and nurses are losing their jobs. This is the domestic legacy of the Blair-Brown Government."
2—4; March; 2007	Harrogate	Simon Hughes	
16—20; September; 2007	Brighton	Simon Hughes	
7—9; March; 2008	Liverpool	Rosalind Scott	The fourth Leader of the Liberal Democrats, Nick Clegg, addressing the 2008 Federal (Autumn) Conference. He led the party from 2007 to 2015. The first Federal Conference with Nick Clegg as Leader, following the Liberal Democrats Leadership Election, on 18 December 2007. The new leader talks about the failures of the political system to improve living standards and respond to the public's needs, and continues: "No wonder people are tired of politics. Tired of a system that swings like a pendulum between two establishment parties. Tired of the same old politicians, the same old fake choices, the same old feeling that nothing ever changes. But this isn't a story of indifference. People do care about issues. Climate change. Poverty. Their local school or hospital. There are marches and campaigns and petitions launched every day of the week. People care. They just don't care about politicians".
15—17; September; 2008	Bournemouth	Rosalind Scott	
13—14; March; 2009	Harrogate	Rosalind Scott	Howard Dean, Chair of the US Democratic Party, speaks to Lib Dem members in Harrogate about the victory of Barack Obama in the 2008 US Presidential Election
23—25; September; 2009	Bournemouth	Rosalind Scott	
18—23; March; 2010	Birmingham	Rosalind Scott	
16; May; 2010	Birmingham	Rosalind Scott	Special Conference to debate the Party's joining the coalition government.
18—22; September; 2010	Liverpool	Rosalind Scott	The September 2010 Conference is the first after the party has entered government for the first time, in a coalition with the Conservative Party, led by Prime Minister David Cameron. The Liberal Democrat leader, Nick Clegg, has become Deputy Prime Minister. Clegg receives a three-minute standing ovation from the Conference Hall before his speech. He says that the coalition wasn't easy to achieve, and that it required difficult negotiations, but that five months on, the coalition has made good progress, and that the public should stick with the party as it is committed to "changing Britain for good". He says that the "chance for change" has come, and that the Liberal Democrats have "responded with real courage and conviction". Clegg says that the Conservatives had been willing to "embrace negotiation and compromise", and continues, "We created a government which will govern, and govern well, for the next five years. Hold our nerve and we will have changed British politics for good. Hold our nerve and we will have changed Britain for good". He acknowledges that the budget deficit reduction programme, reducing the level of public debt incurred by the previous Labour government, represents "unsettling times", but states that it will be implemented "as fairly as possible", with the long-term goal of "wiping the slate clean for a new generation".
11—13; March; 2011	Sheffield	Tim Farron	
17—21; September; 2011	Birmingham	Tim Farron	
9—11; March; 2012	Gateshead	Tim Farron	
22—26; September; 2012	Brighton	Tim Farron	
8—10; March; 2013	Brighton	Tim Farron	
14—18; September; 2013	Glasgow	Tim Farron	
7—9; March; 2014	York	Tim Farron	
4—8; October; 2014	Glasgow	Tim Farron	
13—15; March; 2015	Liverpool	Sal Brinton	
19—23; September; 2015	Bournemouth	Sal Brinton	The fifth Leader of the Liberal Democrats, Tim Farron, addressing the 2015 Lib Dem (Autumn) Conference. He led the party from 2015 to 2017. The first Federal Conference with Tim Farron as Leader, following the Liberal Democrats Leadership Election, on 16 July 2015. Farron tells the Federal Conference that, after the worst general election defeat in 45 years, the party has now become more relevant than ever, with people on low incomes suffering a further fall in living standards, and business threatened by losing access to European markets after the forthcoming EU Referendum. He continues by saying, "Britain needs an opposition that is economically credible, radical, liberal. Britain needs an opposition that is passionate and socially just. Britain needs an opposition that is serious about power to make a difference, to improve all our lives. Under my leadership the Liberal Democrats will be that opposition, because if we do not do this, it is clear now that no one else will. The alternative will be years of a disastrous one-party monopoly". Conference votes that all party members attending Conference will be able to vote, starting with Spring Conference 2016. It also introduces one member, one vote of all party members for party committees, such as the Federal Executive, Federal Policy Committee and Federal Conference Committee, starting with the next round of elections at Autumn Conference 2016.
11—13; March; 2016	York	Sal Brinton	
17—20; September; 2016	Brighton	Sal Brinton	
17—19; March; 2017	York	Sal Brinton	
16—19; September; 2017	Bournemouth	Sal Brinton	The sixth Leader of the Liberal Democrats, Vince Cable. He led the party from 2017 to 2019. The first Federal Conference with Vince Cable as Leader, following the Liberal Democrats Leadership Election, on 20 July 2017. In his first Leader's Speech, Cable pays tribute to his predecessor, Tim Farron, saying that the party under his leadership was "larger, stronger and more diverse" than before. Cable continues by saying, "Anyone who doubts the relevance of the Liberal Democrats should reflect on the three great disasters perpetrated by the two main parties in recent years: the war in Iraq; the banking crisis; now Brexit. You may remember that the Labour government, egged on by the Conservative opposition, plunged this country into a disastrous, illegal war. It helped to fuel the jihadist movements which terrorise the Middle East, and our own country, and our allies, to this day. Then, the same government lost control of the economy. It allowed reckless and greedy bankers to run amok. Yet again, the Conservatives egged Labour on, demanding even less restraint." "The Liberal Democrats warned that it would end badly. And it did. An economy built on banking and property speculation was left dangerously exposed to the global financial crisis. And the baleful consequences are still with us: our economy continues to be dependent on the life support system of ultra-cheap money, which is now inflating a new credit bubble". He added: "Quite simply, Brexit Britain will be poorer and weaker than if we had decided to stay in Europe. Brexit was described by the Brexit Secretary himself as an operation of such technical complexity that it makes the moon landing look simple. "I have to say it is a pity that the Brexit landing is being managed by people who would struggle to get their heads around a toddlers’ Lego set".
9—11; March; 2018	Southport	Sal Brinton	
15—18; September; 2018	Brighton	Sal Brinton	In the 30th year from the founding of the Liberal Democrats, Federal Conference launches a new slogan for the party, Demand Better, and party members vote for Policy paper 134: Demand Better: Liberal Democrat priorities for a better Britain, the first time that a full policy prospectus had emerged between elections. It is also the first time that the party's overall approach has been decided in advance, with policies specifically advanced to further that approach. This is in marked contrast to political parties' usual method of accumulating detailed policies and then trying to create an appropriate slogan to accommodate them when an election nears. The aforementioned motion is, however, overwhelmingly amended to remove references to a so-called 'progressive alliance' and the debate over this is framed as a debate over standing aside for other parties by all involved with the voting body of conference resolving that the party should not stand aside for the Labour or Green parties due to their perceived illiberalism. The party leader, Vince Cable, announces plans to create a registered supporters' scheme, to enable non-members to vote in leadership elections without needing to pay a join-up fee. He says that around 200,000 individuals who are not party members have volunteered for the party, and it is believed that giving them a say will help expand support for the party.
15–17; March; 2019	York	Sal Brinton	Vince Cable's last Conference speech as party leader. He talks about the disillusionment the public feel about politics, and continues, "I am proud of the role our party has played, unapologetically leading the case for Remaining for an Exit from Brexit through securing and then winning a People's Vote. Against all the odds, our cause is very much alive. We have been quite clear that the 2016 referendum, now more than 2½ years ago, was not a good basis for leaving. It was undertaken solely to satisfy an internal quarrel inside the Conservative Party." "A narrow majority of voters, and only 37% of the electorate, voted to Leave. Facts change, and they have changed. We also now understand much better the scale of the cheating and lying, which went on to secure the result. Without a confirmatory referendum there will be no such thing as the ‘settled will of the people’: merely a feud without end. I remain astounded that some people claim a new referendum would be undemocratic. What is democracy if it is not the right for a country to change its mind?".
14–17; September; 2019	Bournemouth	Sal Brinton	The seventh Leader of the Liberal Democrats, Jo Swinson, addressing members during the Conference Rally, on the first day of the 2019 Lib Dem (Autumn) Conference. She led the party from July to December 2019. The first Federal Conference with Jo Swinson as Leader, following her landslide win in the Liberal Democrats Leadership Election, on 22 July 2019. After receiving a standing ovation, Jo Swinson talks of her early life before politics, how her father had been an inspiration and why the party's values became so important for her. She continues by talking about the importance of fighting for the "heart and soul of Britain", pledging to stop Brexit and stating that the country deserves "a better choice than an entitled Etonian or a 1970s socialist". To wide applause, she says that she is standing "as your candidate for Prime Minister", and that in the case that the party wins a majority of seats, it would revoke Article 50. Swinson also pledges that future government budgets would be based not only on GDP figures but on factors of national wellbeing, inspired by a model used by the Prime Minister of New Zealand, Jacinda Ardern. She says that policies would be developed by gauging their long-term impact on a range of factors, such as life satisfaction, happiness, anxiety and the feeling of whether something had been worthwhile. Swinson also promises to set a target of net zero carbon emissions, to create a new Green Investment Bank and to use a different approach to tackling youth crime.
13–15; March; 2020	York	Mark Pack	The 2020 Spring Conference was cancelled, due to the COVID-19 pandemic.
25–28; September; 2020	Online	Mark Pack	The eighth Leader of the Liberal Democrats, Ed Davey. He became the party's Acting Co-Leader in December 2019 and Leader from August 2020. The first Federal Conference with Ed Davey as Leader, following the Liberal Democrats Leadership Election, on 27 August 2020. The Conference is held online due to the ongoing COVID-19 pandemic. The party votes for a variety of Motions at its online 'virtual' conference, among them a commitment to campaign for Universal Basic Income, to alleviate the social and economic effects of the COVID pandemic, provide a more flexible and supportive social security system to enable individuals to retrain for work, meet basic income requirements and provide support for unpaid work such as caring for family members, in a precarious post-COVID world. In an online speech introducing himself to the public, Davey pledges to "stand up for carers", drawing on his experiences as a carer throughout his life: from his early teenage years, nursing his mother through bone cancer, bringing her tumblers of morphine every morning before going off to school, to his adult life in caring for his own severely disabled son, saying "John needs 24/7 care - and probably always will". Talking to Britain's carers, he says, "I understand what you're going through and I promise you this: I will be your voice. I will be the voice of the nine million carers in our country". Davey also makes clear that, "after three deeply disappointing elections", in 2015, 2017 and 2019, voters feel the party has become "out of touch" with their concerns, and he promises to listen to, and engage with, them.
19–21 March 2021	Online	Mark Pack	Policy motion: A Better Response to the Impact of COVID-19 on Education Policy motion: Accessibility in Education; Policy motion: Safe and Legal Routes to Save Lives
17 September 2021	Canary Wharf	Mark Pack	Policy motion:Scrap (the)Coronavirus Act 2020. Policy motion: Opposition to vaccine passports.
11–13 March 2022	Online	Mark Pack	Policy motion: Tackling the Cost–of–Living Crisis Policy motion: Supporting Hospitality, Retail and Leisure in the Face of Omicron; Policy motion: COP27 and Climate Empowerment for Local Government
17–20 September 2022	Brighton	Mark Pack	Cancelled following the death of Elizabeth II, the late Queen's funeral was held on 19 September 2022. On Sunday 6 November leader Ed Davey delivered a high-profile speech in lieu of his conference appearance.
17–19 March 2023	York	Mark Pack	Policy motion: A More Caring Society
23–26 September 2023	Bournemouth	Mark Pack	Ed Davey's first in person Autumn conference
15–17 March 2024	York	Mark Pack	
14–17 September 2024	Brighton	Mark Pack	Following the increase in the number of Lib Dem MPs, from 11 in the 2019 General Election to 72 in the 2024 General Election, and the formerly-governing Conservative Party's loss of over 250 seats, the party leader, Ed Davey, suggests that the Lib Dems could eventually become the main party of opposition.
21–23 March 2025	Harrogate	Mark Pack	
20–23 September 2025	Bournemouth	Mark Pack	
13–15 March 2026	York	Josh Babarinde	
19–22 September 2026	Brighton	Josh Babarinde	

== See also ==
- Liberal Reform
- Social Liberal Forum
- Young Liberals
- One member, one vote
- Party conference season
- Conservative Party Conference
- Labour Party Conference
