= David Laws =

British politician (born 1965)

The Right Honourable David Laws
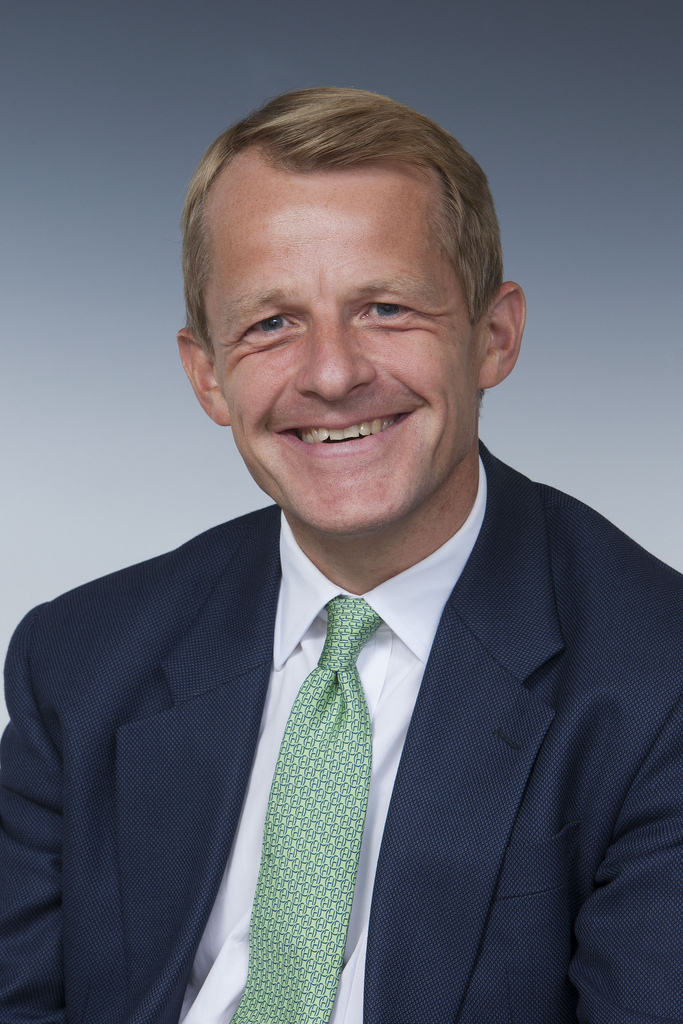
- Laws in 2014

Minister Assisting the Deputy Prime Minister (Note: As Minister of State at the Cabinet Office)
- In office 4 September 2012 – 8 May 2015
- Prime Minister: David Cameron
- Preceded by: David Miliband (2005)
- Succeeded by: The Lord True (2020)

Minister of State for Schools
- In office 4 September 2012 – 8 May 2015
- Prime Minister: David Cameron
- Preceded by: Nick Gibb
- Succeeded by: Nick Gibb

Chief Secretary to the Treasury
- In office 12 May 2010 – 29 May 2010
- Prime Minister: David Cameron
- Chancellor: George Osborne
- Preceded by: Liam Byrne
- Succeeded by: Danny Alexander

Member of Parliament for Yeovil
- In office 7 June 2001 – 30 March 2015
- Preceded by: Paddy Ashdown
- Succeeded by: Marcus Fysh

Personal details
- Born: David Anthony Laws; 30 November 1965 (age 60) Farnham, England
- Party: Liberal Democrats
- Domestic partner: James Lundie (2001–present)
- Education: King's College, Cambridge

David Anthony Laws (born 30 November 1965) is a British politician who served as the Member of Parliament (MP) for Yeovil from 2001 to 2015. A member of the Liberal Democrats, in his third parliament he served at the outset as a Cabinet Minister, in 2010, as Chief Secretary to the Treasury; as well as later concurrently as Minister of State for Schools and Minister Assisting the Deputy Prime Minister – an office where he worked cross-departmentally on implementing the coalition agreement in policies - from 2012 to 2015.

Following a career in investment banking, Laws became an economic adviser and later Director of Policy and Research for his party. In 2001, he was elected as MP for Yeovil, succeeding former Liberal Democrat leader Paddy Ashdown. In 2004, he co-edited The Orange Book, followed by Britain After Blair in 2006. Following the 2010 general election, Laws was a senior party negotiator in the coalition agreement which underpinned the party's parliamentary five-year coalition government with the Conservative Party.

He held the office of Chief Secretary to the Treasury for 17 days before resigning owing to the disclosure of his parliamentary expenses claims, described by the Parliamentary Standards and Privileges Committee as "a series of serious breaches of the rules, over a considerable period of time", albeit unintended; the Parliamentary Commissioner for Standards found "no evidence that [he] made his claims with the intention of benefiting himself or his partner in conscious breach of the rules." His was among the six cabinet resignations during the expenses scandal; he was suspended from Parliament for seven days by vote of the House of Commons. In the 2012 cabinet reshuffle, he attended cabinet as Minister of State for School Standards and Minister Assisting the Deputy Prime Minister. He was unseated by Conservative Marcus Fysh in the 2015 general election.

== Early life and education ==
Laws was born in Farnham, Surrey, son of a Conservative-voting father who was a banker, and a Labour-voting mother. He has an older brother and a younger sister, both adopted.

Laws was educated at fee-paying independent schools: Woburn Hill School in the town of Weybridge, Surrey, from 1974 to 1979; and St George's College, Weybridge, a Roman Catholic day school in the same town, from 1979 to 1984. Regarded as a skilled speaker in intellectual argument, he won the national Observer Schools Mace Debating Championship in 1984.

Laws graduated in 1987 from King's College, Cambridge, with a double first in economics.

== Career ==
Laws went into investment banking, becoming a vice president at JP Morgan from 1987 to 1992 and then a managing director, being the Head of US Dollar and Sterling Treasuries at Barclays de Zoete Wedd.

He left in 1994, to take up the role of economic adviser to the Liberal Democrats, on a salary of £15,000 (equivalent to £31,600 in 2025). He unsuccessfully contested Folkestone and Hythe in 1997 against Home Secretary Michael Howard (Conservative). From 1997 to 1999 he was the Liberal Democrats' Director of Policy and Research.

Following the 1999 Scottish Parliament election, Laws played a leading advisory role in the negotiation of the Scottish Parliament coalition agreement with Labour, being the party's Policy Director.

== Parliamentary career ==
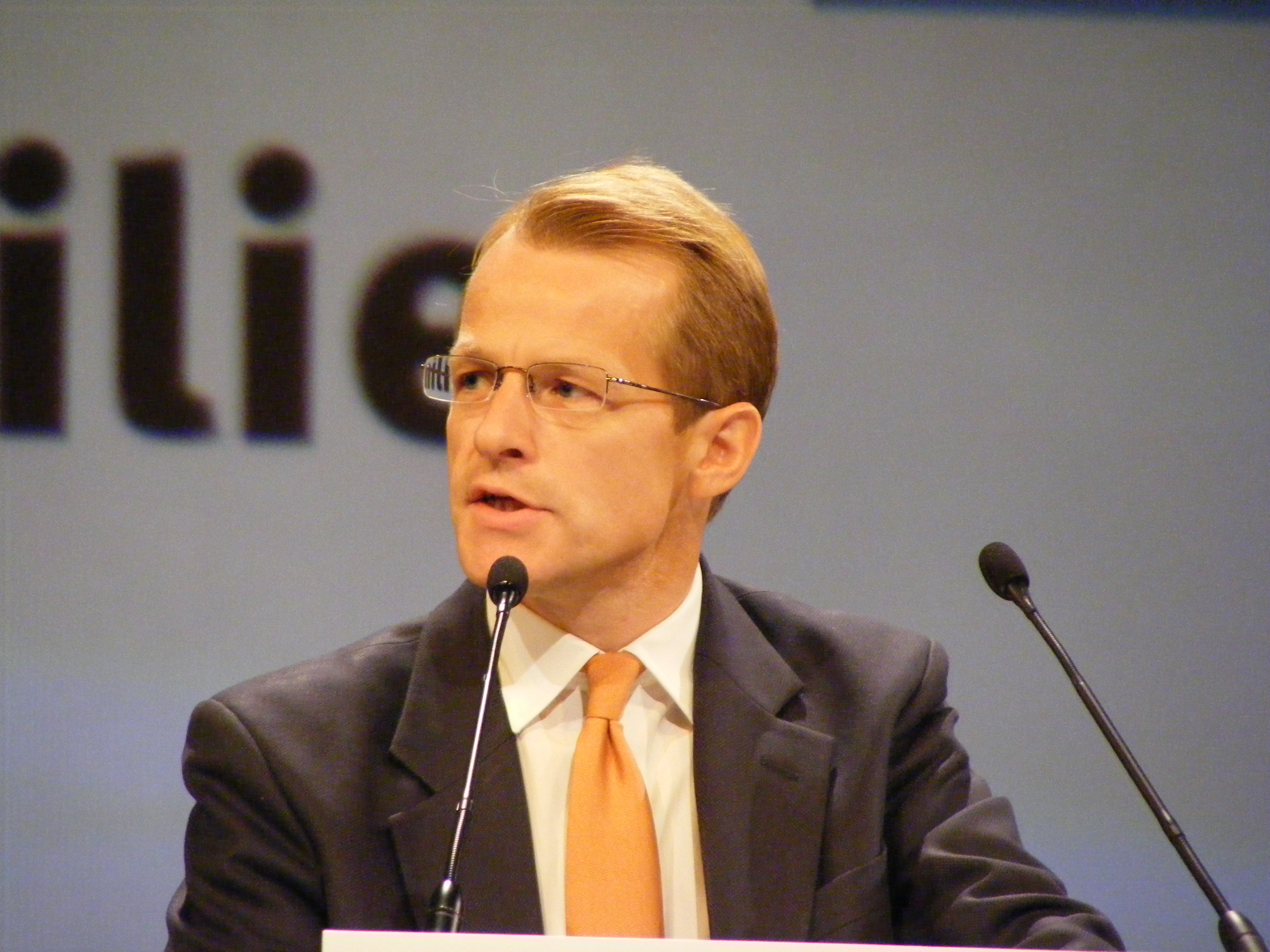
Laws at the Autumn Liberal Democrat Conference in 2008

Laws had joined the Liberal Democrats back office at the same time as Nick Clegg while the party was led by Paddy Ashdown. When Ashdown resigned the leadership of the party and then decided to stand down as an MP, Laws was selected for his seat. Both would walk the constituency in what former Royal Marine Ashdown described as mufti attire; but on election day, Laws wore tailored suits.

Following his election to parliament, Laws became a member of the Treasury Committee, and he was appointed the party's deputy Defence spokesman in November 2001. In 2002, he became his party's Treasury spokesman and issued an alternative spending review.

He was the co-editor of The Orange Book, published in 2004 in so doing creating the term Orange Book liberalism. In 2005, he was appointed the Liberal Democrats' Work and Pensions spokesman, a position in which he was critical of the government's handling of the Child Support Agency and flaws in the tax credits system. He was subsequently the Liberal Democrat spokesman on Children, Schools and Families. He wrote a lesser-selling book in 2006, Britain After Blair.

Shadow Chancellor George Osborne offered Laws a seat in the Conservative shadow cabinet, but was rebuffed, with Laws saying "I am not a Tory, and if I merely wanted a fast track to a top job, I would have acted on this instinct a long time ago." Following the resignation of Sir Menzies Campbell on 15 October 2007, Laws announced that he would not be a candidate for the leadership of the party.

=== Government ===
Following the 2010 general election, Laws was one of four negotiators for the Liberal Democrats who negotiated a deal to go into a governing coalition with the Conservatives. His account of the coalition's formation was published in November 2010 as 22 Days in May.

Laws was one of five Liberal Democrats to obtain Cabinet positions when the coalition was formed, becoming Chief Secretary to the Treasury, tasked with cutting spending and increasing tax take without increasing rates of taxation to eliminate the national deficit. He was appointed as a Privy Counsellor on 13 May 2010.

Laws's predecessor, Liam Byrne, wrote a note to his successor as Chief Secretary to the Treasury, which read "Dear Chief Secretary, I'm afraid there is no money. Kind regards - and good luck! Liam". Laws slightly misquoted the note at a press briefing as "I'm afraid to tell you there's no money left". Byrne said that the note was "a joke, from one chief secretary to another", but that it was a "foolish letter to write", and he regretted that it had "made me look flippant". In 2016, Byrne said that the note had been a "centrepiece" of the Conservative Party's campaigning for the 2015 United Kingdom general election.

Outlining spending cuts in May 2010, Laws said Child Trust Fund payments would be axed by January 2011. He said halting these payments to newborns from the end of the year – and the top-up payments – would save £520m. Mr Laws said: "The years of public sector plenty are over, but the more decisively we act the quicker and stronger we can come through these tough times." He said that "We also promise to cut with care, we are going to be a progressive government even in these tough times". Iain Martin of The Wall Street Journal published an article on Laws's early performance and described him as a "potential future prime minister"

=== Expenses scandal, resignation and suspension from Parliament ===
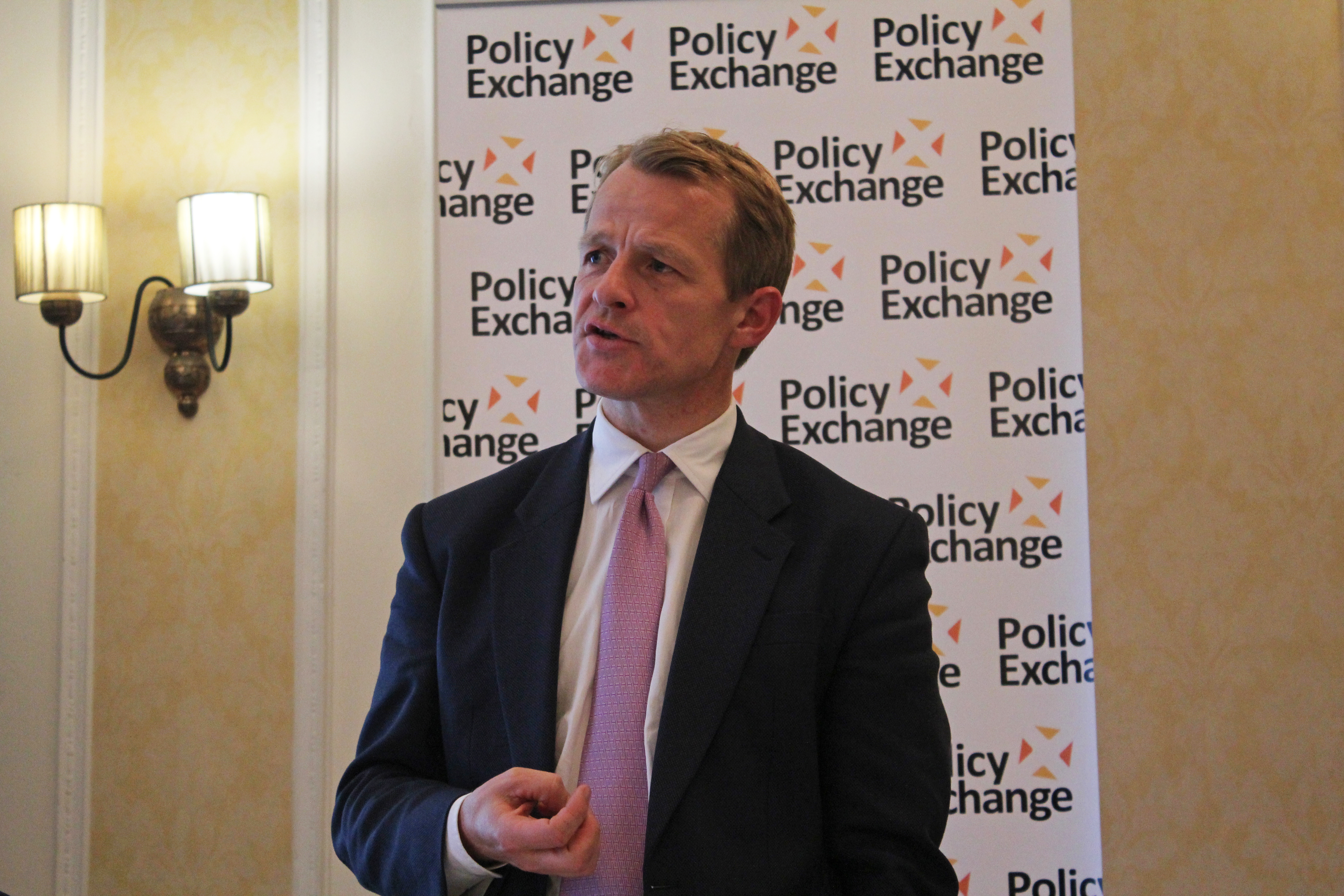
Laws speaking in 2013

On 28 May 2010, The Daily Telegraph disclosed that Laws had claimed more than £40,000 on his expenses in the form of second home costs, from 2004 to late 2009, during which time he had been renting rooms at properties owned by what the newspaper claimed to be his "secret lover" and "long-term partner", James Lundie. They were not in a civil partnership. The Daily Telegraph had not intended to reveal his sexuality, but Laws himself did so, in a public statement shortly before the newspaper's publication of the story. Lundie is a former Liberal Democrat Press officer and later worked for the Political Affairs team of Edelman, a public relations and lobbying firm.

Laws misclaimed second home allowances of between £700 and £950 a month rent between 2006 and 2007, plus typically £100 to £200 a month for maintenance, to rent a room in a flat as the flat was owned and lived in by Lundie (in Kennington, south London). Lundie replaced his property with a house in 2007. Laws then recovered from the second home allowance the rent for its "second bedroom" at £920 a month, until September 2009. Laws afterwards rented another flat not owned by Lundie, who remained at the Kennington house. Since 2006 the relevant rules banned MPs from "leasing accommodation from... a partner."

Laws resigned as Chief Secretary to the Treasury on 29 May 2010, stating that he could not carry on working on the Comprehensive Spending Review while dealing with the private and public implications of the revelations. He claimed that his reason for the way he had claimed expenses had been to keep private details of his sexuality and that he had not benefited financially from this misdirection.

In May 2011 the Parliamentary Commissioner for Standards reported to the Standards and Privileges Committee on the investigation into his conduct. The Committee concluded that Laws was guilty of breaking six rules with regard to expenses. The Commissioner reported that none of the claims for the London properties was acceptable under the rules but that he had not intended to benefit himself or Lundie directly. In addition to finding against Laws with regard to the payment of rent to his friend, the investigation also found irregularities in phone bill and building work expenses. The Committee concluded that "... the rental agreements submitted [by Laws] between 2003 and 2008 were misleading and designed to conceal the nature of the relationship. They prevented any examination of the arrangements that in fact pertained over the entire period". Further, his claims for rent were in excess of market levels for a lodging agreement and a market-level agreement would not have included contributions from the lodger towards building repairs and maintenance which were claimed. The Committee concluded that it was inappropriate to judge whether the claims on a particular property were appropriate by reference to potential payments on another property, which was not in fact claimed for.

The commissioner stated "I have no evidence that Mr Laws made his claims with the intention of benefiting himself or his partner in conscious breach of the rules."

Being found in unintended breach, Laws was suspended from the House of Commons for seven days by a House of Commons vote on 16 May 2011. Laws gave costed estimates to the investigation showing his expenses could have been almost £30,000 higher over 2004–2010 if renting or claiming mortgage payments on his Somerset home which he owned outright. Olly Grender, journalist and former party Communications Director echoed this argument an article in 2011 in the New Statesman stressing that "If he had allocated his constituency home as his second home he would have still been in the cabinet, having claimed £30,000 more".

The Committee mentioned the conduct of Laws after May 2010, stating: "We have also considered whether there needs to be a stronger sanction than repayments. Not only has Mr Laws already resigned from the Cabinet, his behaviour since May 2010 has been exemplary. He quickly referred himself to the Commissioner, has already repaid allowances from July 2006 in full, and has cooperated fully with the Commissioner's investigation". The committee's conclusion was however that a stronger sanction than repayment was indeed needed. This led to the vote temporarily excluding Laws from the House of Commons.

=== Return to government ===
Laws returned to Government as Minister of State for Schools in the Department for Education and Minister of State in the Cabinet Office in September 2012. He was permitted to attend Cabinet, not as a full member but because of his strategic portfolio. He was also responsible for implementation of the coalition agreement and contributed to Liberal Democrat strategy in the run-up to the 2015 election.

=== Post-parliamentary career ===
Laws lost his seat in the 2015 General Election and declined an offer to be seated in the House of Lords. When CentreForum was rebranded and refocused in 2016 as the Education Policy Institute, Laws was hired to lead it.

== Political views ==
In initial debates on the spending cuts, Conservative MP for Gainsborough, Edward Leigh described Laws as heeding to "stern, unbending Gladstonian Liberalism". Laws added that he believed in "not only Gladstonian Liberalism, but liberalism tinged with the social liberalism about which my party is so passionate."

Around the time of the 2010 general election, it was alleged that Laws told a Conservative colleague that he would have become a Conservative politician had it not been for the Tory party's general "illiberalism and Euroscepticism" and particularly the Thatcher government's introduction of Section 28, which forbade local authorities from "promot[ing] homosexuality". According to former MP Evan Harris, one of Laws's former colleagues, "Laws is a fully social liberal on equality, abortion, faith schools, religion and the state. He is also very sensible on discrimination issues and sex education"; another, Malcolm Bruce described Laws as "an unreconstructed 19th-century Liberal. He believes in free trade and small government. Government should do the job only government can do. There's no point in having [a] large public sector if the users of the public services are getting poorer."

== In popular culture ==
Laws was portrayed by actor Richard Teverson in the 2015 Channel 4 television film Coalition.

Parliament of the United Kingdom
Preceded by Paddy Ashdown	Member of Parliament for Yeovil; 2001–2015	Succeeded by Marcus Fysh
Political offices
Preceded by Liam Byrne	Chief Secretary to the Treasury; 2010	Succeeded by Danny Alexander
Preceded by Nick Gibb	Minister of State for Schools; 2012–2015	Succeeded by Nick Gibb
Vacant Title last held by David Miliband as Minister of State for the Cabinet Office	Minister Assisting the Deputy Prime Minister; 2012–2015	Vacant Title next held by The Lord True as Minister of State at the Cabinet Office
