= Frontbench team of Paddy Ashdown =

Liberal Democrats frontbench team led by Paddy Ashdown

- 1988–1999
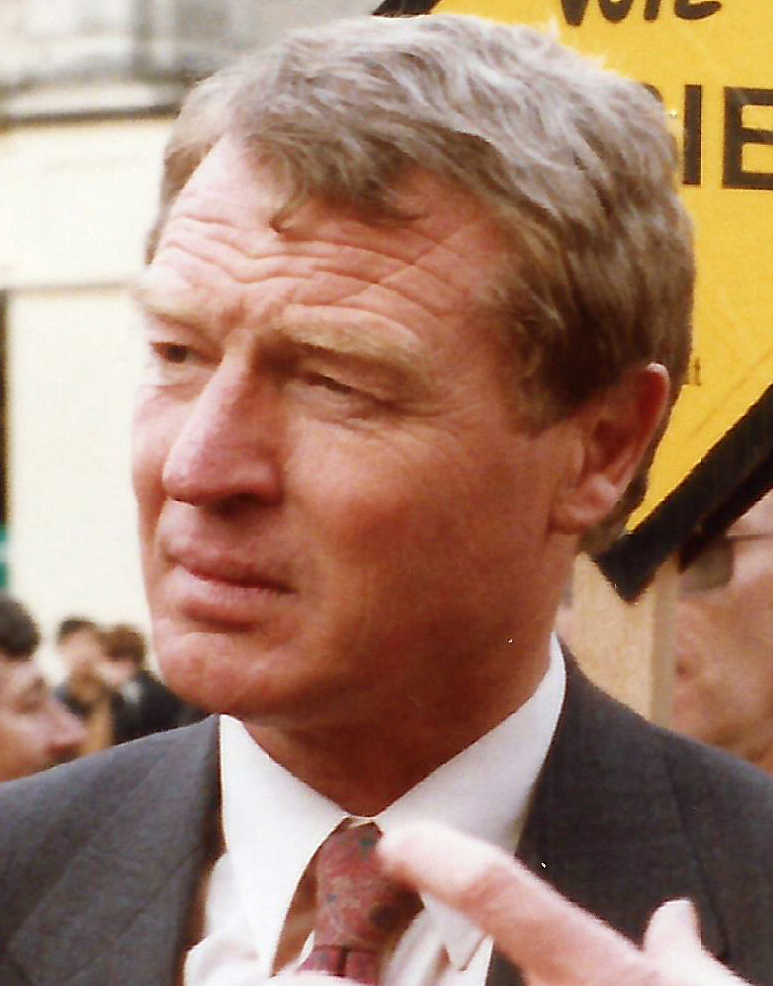
- Date formed: 16 July 1988
- Date dissolved: 9 August 1999

People and organisations
- Monarch: Elizabeth II
- Leader: Paddy Ashdown
- Deputy Leader: Russell Johnston; Alan Beith
- Member party: Liberal Democrats
- Status in legislature: Third party 19 / 651 (3%) (1988-1992); Opposition 20 / 651 (3%) (1992-1997) 46 / 651 (7%) (1997-1999)

History
- Incoming formation: 1988 Social and Liberal Democrats leadership election
- Outgoing formation: 1999 Liberal Democrats leadership election
- Elections: 1992 election 1997 election
- Successor: Frontbench Team of Charles Kennedy

Frontbench Teams since 1997
Ashdown Team (1997–1999)
Kennedy Team (1999–2006)
Campbell Team (2006–2007)
First Cable Team (2007)
Clegg Team (2007–2010)
General Election Cabinet (2015)
Farron Team (2015–2017)
Second Cable Team (2017–2019)
Swinson Team (2019)
Davey Team (2020–present)

The list that follows is the Liberal Democrats frontbench team led by Paddy Ashdown, who was party leader from 1988 to 1999. Initially known as a frontbench team, the Lib Dems began to refer to their Frontbench Team as a "Shadow Cabinet" during the leadership of Ashdown's successor, Charles Kennedy, although the use of the term is controversial.

== Liberal Democrat Frontbench team ==
=== Shadow Cabinet, 1997–1999 ===
Portfolio	Holder
Leader of the Liberal Democrats	The Rt. Hon. Paddy Ashdown MP
Deputy Leader with responsibility for the strategic direction of the Party in Parliament	The Rt. Hon. Alan Beith MP
Home Affairs	The Rt. Hon. Alan Beith MP
Chief Whip; Shadow Leader of the House of Commons	Paul Tyler MP
Treasury	Malcolm Bruce MP
Foreign Affairs, Defence and Europe	Menzies Campbell MP
Agriculture and Rural Affairs	Charles Kennedy MP
Party President; Constitution; Culture, Media and Sport; Civil Service	The Rt. Hon. Robert Maclennan MP
Education and Employment	Don Foster MP
Environment and Transport	Matthew Taylor MP
Health	Simon Hughes MP
Disabled People; Local Government	Paul Burstow MP
Social Security and Wellfare	David Rendel MP
Trade and Industry	David Chidgey MP
Scotland	Jim Wallace MP
Wales	Richard Livsey MP
Northern Ireland; Young People	Lembit Opik MP
Women	Jackie Ballard MP
Leader in the House of Lords	The Rt. Hon. Lord Rodgers of Quarrybank

=== Shadow Cabinet, c.1996–1997 ===
Portfolio	Holder
Leader of the Liberal Democrats	The Rt. Hon. Paddy Ashdown MP
Deputy Leader with responsibility for the strategic direction of the Party in Parliament	The Rt. Hon. Alan Beith MP
Chief Whip; Shadow Leader of the House of Commons	Archy Kirkwood MP
Treasury and Economic Affairs	Malcolm Bruce MP
Foreign Affairs, Defence and Overseas Development	Menzies Campbell MP
Justice and Home Affairs; Wales	Alex Carlile MP
Education, Housing and Local Government	Don Foster MP
Environment	Matthew Taylor MP
Health and Social Wellfare	Simon Hughes MP
National Heritage; President of the Liberal Democrats	Robert Maclennan MP
Scotland	Jim Wallace MP
Leader in the House of Lords	The Rt. Hon. Lord Jenkins of Hillhead

=== Roles by Department ===
Sits in the House of Commons
Sits in the House of Lords
Privy Counsellor
Shadow Cabinet full members **in bold**
Shadow Cabinet attendees **in bold italics**

Whips office
Chief Whip and Shadow Leader of the House of Commons	**Paul Tyler**
Shadow Leader of the House of Lords	Lord Jenkins of Hillhead (until December 1997)
Shadow Leader of the House of Lords	Lord Rodgers of Quarrybank
Deputy Whip	Andrew Stunell
Whips	Ed Davey
Whips	Donald Gorrie
Whips	Adrian Sanders

Agriculture, Fisheries, Food and Rural Affairs
Agriculture & Rural Affairs	**Charles Kennedy**
Food	Paul Tyler
Fisheries	Andrew George

Constitution
Constitution	**Robert Maclennan**
English Regions	Nick Harvey
Scotland	Jim Wallace
Wales	Richard Livsey
Northern Ireland	Lembit Opik

Culture, Media and Sport and Civil Service
Arts & Broadcasting	**Robert Maclennan**
Tourism	Ronnie Fearn
Sport	Nigel Jones

Education and Employment
Nursery Education & Schools; Labour market statistics	**Don Foster**
Further, higher and adult education	Phil Willis
Employment and training	Paul Keetch

Environment and Transport
Environment and Transport	**Matthew Taylor**
Environment and Transport	Norman Baker
Environment and Transport	Tom Brake
Environment and Transport	Sir Robert Smith
Environment and Transport	Andrew Stunell

Foreign Affairs, Defence and Europe
Foreign and Commonwealth, Europe and Defence	**Menzies Campbell**
Defence	Mike Hancock
Europe	David Heath
International Development	Jenny Tonge

Health
Future of the NHS	**Simon Hughes**
Public Health	Peter Brand
NHS Staff, organisation and planning	Evan Harris

Home and Legal Affairs
Home Affairs	**Alan Beith**
Community relations and urban affairs	Richard Allan
Attorney General	John Burnett
Lord Chancellor	Bob Russell

Local Government and Housing
Local Government (Social Services and Community Care)	**Paul Burstow**
Local Council Liaison	Jackie Ballard
Housing	Adrian Sanders

Social Security and Wellfare
Social Security and Wellfare	**David Rendel**
Social Security and Wellfare	Steve Webb

Trade and Industry
Employment, Social Chapter & Minimum Wage	**David Chidgey**
Science and Technology	Nigel Jones
Competition	Colin Breed
Small Business	Brian Cotter

Treasury
Treasury	**Malcolm Bruce**
Treasury	Ed Davey
Treasury	Vince Cable

Scotland
Scotland	**Jim Wallace**
Scotland	Ray Michie
Scotland	Donald Gorrie
Scotland	Michael Moore

Wales
Wales	**Richard Livsey**
Wales	Lembit Öpik (also Northern Ireland)
