= Frontbench team of Charles Kennedy =

Liberal Democrats Frontbench Team/Shadow Cabinet led by Charles Kennedy

- 1999–2006
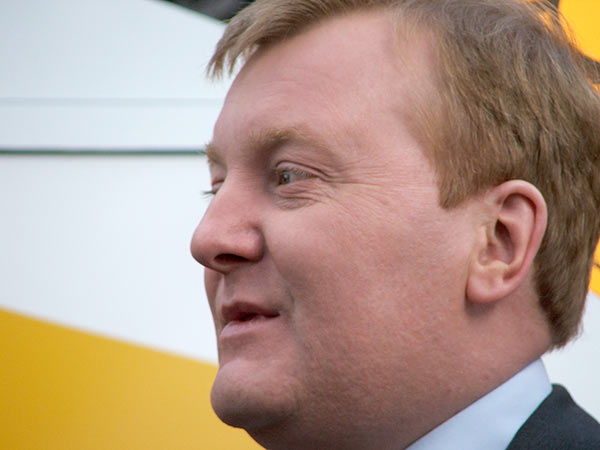
- Date formed: 9 August 1999
- Date dissolved: 7 January 2006

People and organisations
- Monarch: Elizabeth II
- Leader: Charles Kennedy
- Deputy Leader: Menzies Campbell; Alan Beith
- Member party: Liberal Democrats
- Status in legislature: Third party 46 / 651 (7%) (1999-2001); Opposition 52 / 651 (8%) (2001-2005) 62 / 651 (10%) (2005-2006)

History
- Incoming formation: 1999 Liberal Democrats leadership election
- Outgoing formation: 2006 Liberal Democrats leadership election
- Elections: 2001 election 2005 election
- Predecessor: Frontbench Team of Paddy Ashdown
- Successor: Frontbench Team of Menzies Campbell

Frontbench Teams since 1997
Ashdown Team (1997–1999)
Kennedy Team (1999–2006)
Campbell Team (2006–2007)
First Cable Team (2007)
Clegg Team (2007–2010)
General Election Cabinet (2015)
Farron Team (2015–2017)
Second Cable Team (2017–2019)
Swinson Team (2019)
Davey Team (2020–present)

The list that follows is the Liberal Democrats Frontbench Team/Shadow Cabinet led by Charles Kennedy, who was Party leader from 1999 to 2006. The Party began to refer to its Frontbench Team as a Shadow Cabinet during Kennedy's tenure as leader.

== 2005–2006 ==
=== Shadow Cabinet ===
Portfolio	Holder
Leader of the Liberal Democrats	Charles Kennedy MP
Deputy Leader of the Liberal Democrats; Foreign Affairs	Menzies Campbell MP
Treasury	Vince Cable MP
Home Affairs	Mark Oaten MP
Defence	Michael Moore MP
Trade and Industry	Norman Lamb MP
Work and Pensions	David Laws MP
Education and Skills	Ed Davey MP
Communities and Local Government	Sarah Teather MP
Office of the Deputy Prime Minister; Party President	Simon Hughes MP
Health	Steve Webb MP
Environment and Rural Affairs	Norman Baker MP
International Development	Andrew George MP
Scotland	John Thurso MP
Transport	Tom Brake MP
Culture, Media and Sport	Don Foster MP
Northern Ireland and Wales	Lembit Öpik MP
Women and Older People	Sandra Gidley MP
Leader of the House of Commons	David Heath MP
Leader in the House of Lords	The Lord McNally MP
Chief Whip in the Commons	Andrew Stunell MP
Chief Whip in the Lords	The Lord Shutt of Greetland MP
Chair of the Parliamentary Party	Matthew Taylor MP

== 2003–2005 ==
=== Shadow Cabinet ===
Portfolio	Holder	Cite
Leader of the Liberal Democrats	Charles Kennedy MP	
Deputy Leader of the Liberal Democrats; Foreign Affairs	Menzies Campbell MP	
Treasury	Vince Cable MP	
Shadow Chief Secretary to the Treasury	David Laws MP	
Home Affairs	Mark Oaten MP	
Defence	Paul Keetch MP	
Trade and Industry	Malcolm Bruce MP	
Work and Pensions	Prof. Steve Webb MP	
Education	Phil Willis MP	
Office of the Deputy Prime Minister	Ed Davey MP	
Health	Paul Burstow MP	
Environment and Rural Affairs	Norman Baker MP	
Rural Affairs and Food	Andrew George MP	
International Development	Tom Brake MP	
Scotland; Transport	John Thurso MP	
Culture	Don Foster MP	
Northern Ireland; Wales	Lembit Öpik MP	
Women and Older People	Sandra Gidley MP	
Foreign Affairs	Michael Moore MP	
Leader of the House of Commons	Paul Tyler MP	
Leader in the House of Lords	The Baroness Williams of Crosby (until June 2004)	
Leader in the House of Lords	The Lord McNally (from November 2004)	
Chief Whip in the Commons	Andrew Stunell MP	
Chief Whip in the Lords	The Lord Roper	
Chair of the Parliamentary Party	Matthew Taylor MP	
London Mayoral Candidate	Simon Hughes MP	

== 2001–2003 ==
=== Shadow Cabinet ===
Portfolio	Holder
Leader of the Liberal Democrats	Charles Kennedy MP
Cabinet Office	Alan Beith MP
Deputy Leader of the Liberal Democrats	Alan Beith MP (until February 2003)
Deputy Leader of the Liberal Democrats	Menzies Campbell MP (from February 2003)
Foreign Affairs	Menzies Campbell MP
Shadow Chancellor	Matthew Taylor MP
Shadow Chief Secretary to the Treasury	Ed Davey MP (until June 2002)
Shadow Chief Secretary to the Treasury	David Laws MP (from June 2002)
Home Affairs	Simon Hughes MP
Defence	Paul Keetch MP
Trade and Industry	Vince Cable MP
Work and Pensions	Steve Webb MP
Education and Skills	Phil Willis MP
Transport	Don Foster MP
Transport, Local Government and the Regions	Don Foster MP (until June 2002)
Office of the Deputy Prime Minister	Ed Davey MP (from June 2002)
Health	Evan Harris MP
Rural Affairs and Food	Andrew George MP
Rural Affairs and Food	Malcolm Bruce MP (until January 2002)
Environment	Malcolm Bruce MP (until January 2002)
Environment	Norman Baker MP (from January 2002)
Culture, Media and Sport	Nick Harvey MP
Scotland	John Viscount Thurso MP
Northern Ireland, Welsh and Youth	Lembit Öpik MP
Shadow Leader of the House of Commons	Paul Tyler MP
Leader of the House of Lords	The Baroness Williams of Crosby
Chief Whip	Andrew Stunell MP
Chair of the Parliamentary Party	Mark Oaten MP
Chair of the Campaigns and Communications Committee	The Lord Razzall

== 1999–2001 ==
=== Shadow Cabinet ===
Portfolio	Holder
Leader of the Liberal Democrats	Charles Kennedy MP
Deputy Leader of the Liberal Democrats	Alan Beith MP
Foreign Affairs	Menzies Campbell MP
Economy	Matthew Taylor MP
Home Affairs	Simon Hughes MP
Trade and Industry	Vince Cable MP
Social Security	Prof. Steve Webb MP
Environment, Transport and the Regions and Social Justice	Don Foster MP
Transport	Michael Moore MP
Agriculture, Fisheries, Food and Rural Affairs	Colin Breed MP
Education and Employment	Phil Willis MP
Constitution, Culture and Sport	Robert Maclennan MP
Health	Nick Harvey MP
Health	Dr Jenny Tonge MP
Welsh	Richard Livsey MP
Northern Ireland	Lembit Öpik MP
Scotland	Jim Wallace MP
Chief Whip and Shadow Leader of the House of Commons	Paul Tyler MP
Leader of the House of Lords	Lord Rodgers of Quarry Bank

== Other spokespeople ==
Sits in the House of Commons
Sits in the House of Lords
Privy Counsellor
Shadow Cabinet full members **in bold**
Shadow Cabinet attendees **in bold italics**

Party offices
Leader of the Liberal Democrats	Charles Kennedy
Deputy Leader of the Liberal Democrats	Alan Beith (until February 2003)
Deputy Leader of the Liberal Democrats	Menzies Campbell (from February 2003)
Chair of the Parliamentary Party	Matthew Taylor
President of the Liberal Democrats	Diana Maddock, Baroness Maddock (until December 2000)
President of the Liberal Democrats	Navnit Dholakia, Baron Dholakia (January 2001–December 2004)
President of the Liberal Democrats	Simon Hughes (from January 2005)

House Leaders and Whips office
Chief Whip and Shadow Leader of the House of Commons	**Paul Tyler** (until June 2001)
Chief Whip and Shadow Leader of the House of Commons	Andrew Stunell (from June 2001)
Leader of the House of Lords	Lord Rodgers of Quarrybank (until June 2001)
Leader of the House of Lords	Baroness Williams of Crosby (June 2001–November 2004)
Leader of the House of Lords	Lord McNally (from November 2004)
Deputy Whip	Andrew Stunell

Foreign Affairs, Defence and Europe
Foreign Affairs	**Menzies Campbell**
Defence	Mark Oaten
International Development	Paul Keetch

Economy
Shadow Chancellor	**Matthew Taylor**
Shadow Chief Secretary	Edward Davey

Home and Legal Affairs
Home Affairs	**Simon Hughes**
Home Affairs	Richard Allan
Legal Affairs	John Burnett

Trade and Industry
Trade and Industry	**Vincent Cable**
Consumer Affairs and Broadcasting	Norman Baker
Small business	Brian Cotter

Social Security
Social Security	**Steve Webb**
Social Security	Andrew George
Pensioners	Paul Burstow

Environment, Transport and the Regions and Social Justice
Environment, Transport and the Regions	**Don Foster**
Social Justice	Tom Brake
Social Justice	Adrian Sanders
Transport	Michael Moore

Agriculture, Fisheries, Food and Rural Affairs
Agriculture, Fisheries, Food and Rural Affairs	**Colin Breed**
Agriculture, Fisheries, Food and Rural Affairs	David Heath

Education and Employment
Education and Employment	**Phil Willis**
Employment and Childcare	Jackie Ballard
Higher Education and Women	Evan Harris

Constitution, Culture and Sport
Constitution, Culture and Sport	**Robert Maclennan**
Tourism	Ronnie Fearn
Sport	Bob Russell

Health
Health	**Dr Jenny Tonge**
Health	**Nick Harvey**
Health	Dr Peter Brand

Scotland
Scotland	**Jim Wallace**
Scotland	Ray Michie
Scotland	Sir Robert Smith
