= 2020 Liberal Democrats leadership election =

Leadership election for a political party in the United Kingdom

- 30 July – 27 August 2020
- Turnout: 57.6% (▼14.5pp)
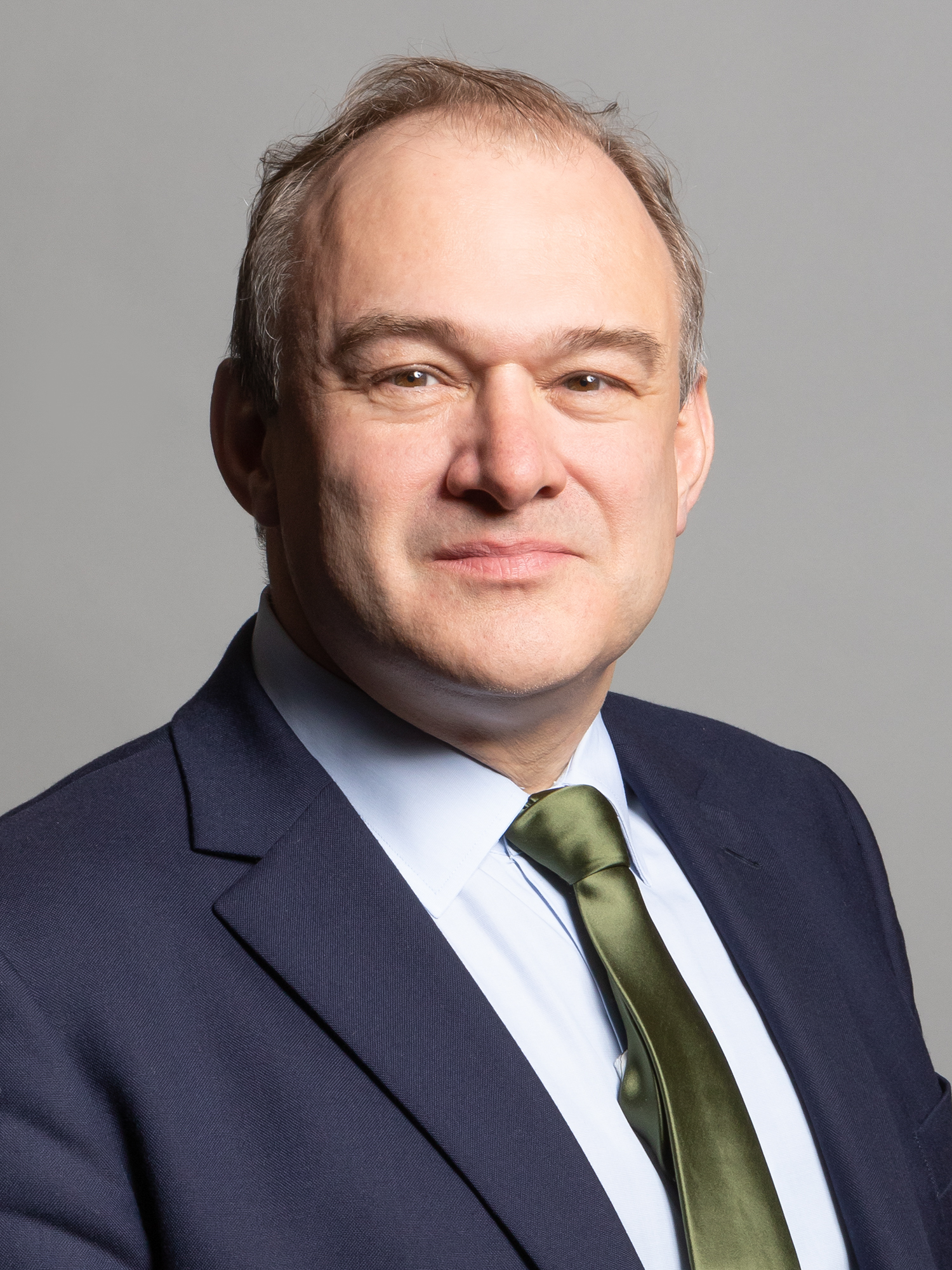

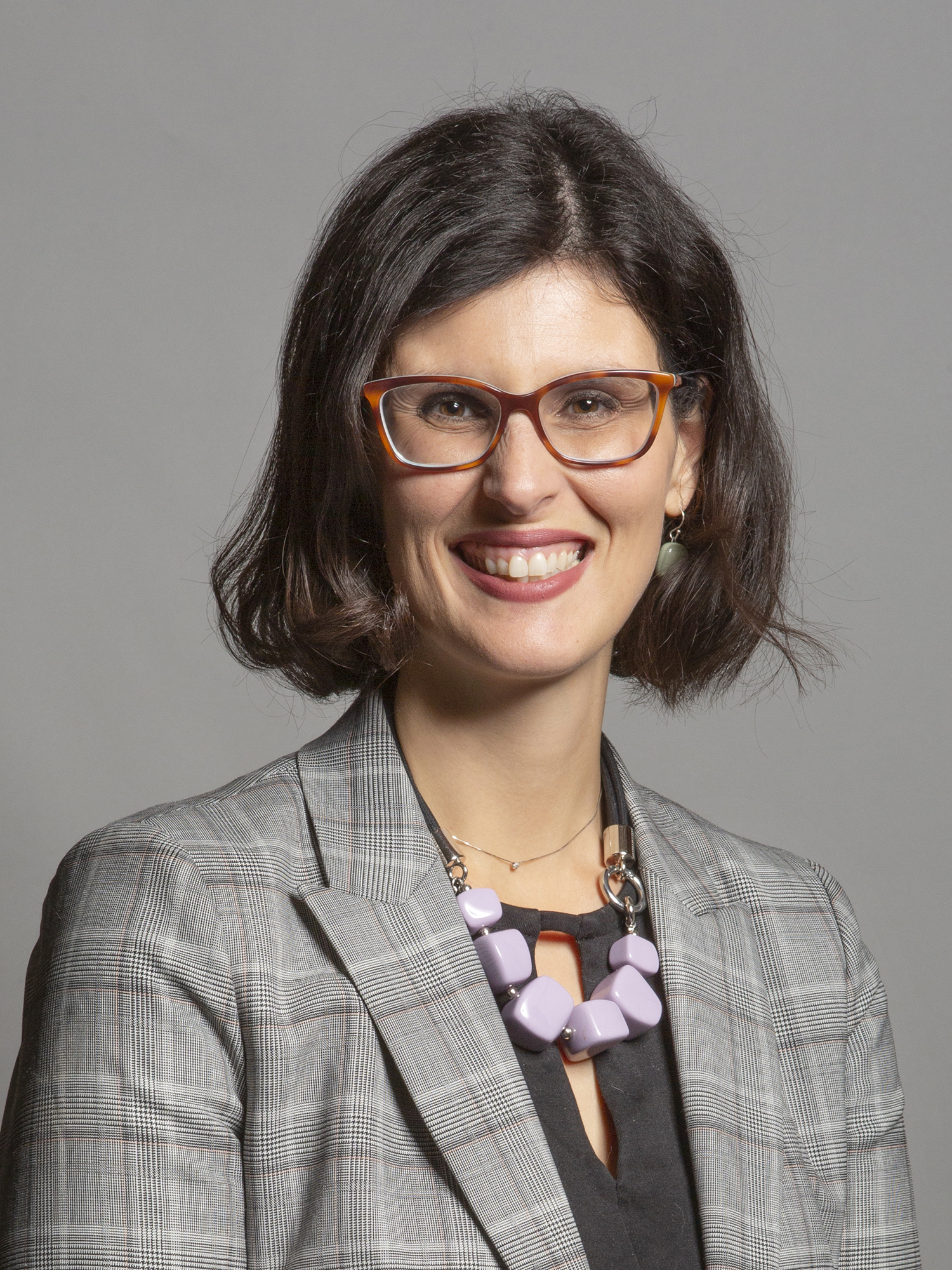
Candidate	Ed Davey	Layla Moran
Popular vote	42,756	24,564
Percentage	63.5%	36.5%
Interim co-leaders before election
Ed Davey
Mark Pack
Elected Leader
Ed Davey

The 2020 Liberal Democrats leadership election was held in August 2020, after Jo Swinson, the previous leader of the Liberal Democrats, lost her seat in the 2019 general election. It was initially set to be held in July 2020, but due to the COVID-19 pandemic it was delayed by six weeks, having been at first postponed until May 2021.

Candidates including Wera Hobhouse and Christine Jardine initially declared their intention to stand but later withdrew. By 9 July, the date nominations officially closed, the only candidates were Ed Davey and Layla Moran. Davey was announced as the winner on 27 August with 63.5% of the vote.

== Background ==
Jo Swinson became leader of the Liberal Democrats in a leadership election in July 2019, following the resignation of Vince Cable. In that election, she beat Ed Davey, who became deputy leader of the party in an uncontested election among Liberal Democrat MPs. Swinson lost her East Dunbartonshire constituency to Amy Callaghan of the Scottish National Party in the 2019 general election by 149 votes. She had first won the seat when it was re-created in 2005, but lost it to John Nicolson of the SNP in 2015, before regaining it in the 2017 general election.

The party leader is required to be a Member of Parliament. As per the party's constitution, when the leader loses their seat, the deputy leader and the party president automatically become acting co-leaders. Davey and Sal Brinton hence took over from Swinson as joint acting leaders, with Mark Pack replacing Brinton at the start of 2020 when her term ended.

The party won eleven seats in the 2019 general election, one fewer than the number they won in 2017, but with an increased national vote share. The party's general election campaign was criticised by the former Liberal Democrat MP Norman Lamb, who blamed the result on the party's platform of opposition to Brexit. Some Liberal Democrat MPs criticised the general election campaign for being "hubristic" with its initial message that Swinson could be the country's next prime minister.

== Procedure ==
A timetable was set at a meeting of the party's governing body, the Federal Board, on 18 January 2020. Nominations were due to open on 11 May, after the local elections which were due to be held on 7 May 2020, and close on 28 May; voting would begin on 18 June and close on 15 July. The timetable allowed time for a review of the party's performance in the 2019 general election.

In March 2020, the election was postponed to May 2021, after the local elections which had been postponed to that month due to the coronavirus pandemic. Reaction to this decision was largely negative amongst the party membership. The party's Federal Appeals Panel found that, although the Federal Board was correct to suspend the election, it did not have power to set the May 2021 date. The panel directed the board to keep the suspension under continuous review until "the exceptional circumstances that exist at present cease".

On 20 May 2020, the party announced that the Federal Board had reversed their decision to delay the election until 2021. Voting would take place between 30 July and 26 August so that a new leader would be in place for the party's federal (Autumn) conference.

Liberal Democrat leadership elections officially use the single transferable vote system, but they are effectively conducted under the alternative vote, as there is only one winner. All party members are entitled to vote under a one member, one vote method. Candidates must be an MP, and must be nominated by at least one other Liberal Democrat MP. Proposed candidates must also have 200 supporters across 20 or more local parties, including the Young Liberals.

The 117,924 ballots issued for the contest was the largest number in the party's history.

=== Timetable ===
The party announced the election's timetable on 20 May.

- 24 June: Nominations open
- 9 July: Nominations close
- 30 July: Voting opens
- 13:00, 26 August: Voting closes
- 11:30, 27 August: Results announced

== Campaign ==
The New Statesman reported in January 2020 that Daisy Cooper, Ed Davey, Wera Hobhouse and Layla Moran were considering standing as candidates. In December 2019 and January 2020, Davey was the betting favourite to win, followed by Moran.

Christine Jardine said in January that she was planning to be a candidate, but withdrew in April. Cooper said that she was considering running in the election in January, but decided against running in May after the party decided to hold the election in 2020. Cooper went on to endorse Davey, which was seen as a setback for Moran, who like Cooper was seen as being on the left wing of the party.

In January, Hobhouse said that she was considering running in the election. In the previous month, she had expressed concern about how she'd be treated as a party leader given that she was an immigrant. She announced that she would run as a candidate on 5 February, in an article for the website PoliticsHome in which she argued that the party should campaign from the centre-left and consider the possibility of the United Kingdom rejoining the European Union. In May, she called for the party to "abandon equidistance", where "equidistance" refers to the idea that the Lib Dems should campaign from a position equally between the Labour Party and the Conservative Party. She said that she would start working with the Labour Party and the Green Party immediately if she were elected leader. On 23 June, she withdrew from the contest and announced that she was backing Moran to be leader, saying that the latter was "the only candidate who can break with our party's damaging legacy from the coalition and adopt a centre-left position to defeat the Conservatives at the next election."

Moran announced that she would stand as a candidate on 8 March, saying that the party needed a "positive vision", with more emphasis on the policy areas of education, the environment and political culture. She said in an interview with Business Insider that the Liberal Democrats should be "more radical than Labour" and ruled out a coalition with the Conservative Party as long as Boris Johnson was its leader. She said she would require a commitment to electoral reform before agreeing to join a coalition with Labour, and that she wanted activists from both parties to work together to take seats from the Conservatives. She had previously criticised the party's approach to the 2019 general election, saying that the party's policy of preventing Brexit meant that voters did not trust the party. In an online virtual hustings event with Welsh members, she said it was a top priority to make sure that Kirsty Williams held her seat in the 2021 Senedd election, and said that the decision in Wales to strike a deal with Plaid Cymru and the Greens for each party not to stand candidates in some constituencies in favour of other parties had been bad for activists' morale. She proposed a Kitemark system to label products made by companies with higher ethical standards. She also supported the introduction of a universal basic income.

In June, acting leader Davey launched his bid to become leader saying that his "experience as a carer can help rebuild Britain after coronavirus". He proposed the establishment of a basic income to support carers, and said that the Liberal Democrats should be "the party of social care". Davey ruled out a formal electoral agreement with the Labour Party, but said that he would prioritise defeating the Conservatives, and ruled out working with the Conservatives following the next election. He proposed a plan to reduce carbon emissions from domestic flights to zero by 2030 through investment in research and technology. In a hustings event with Welsh members, he said that the 2021 Senedd election was a priority and he expected success for the Liberal Democrats.

On 24 June, the first day of nominations, both Davey and Moran received sufficient nominations to progress to the ballot. When nominations closed in July, Davey had more nominations both from members and from MPs than Moran.

Between the final two candidates, Moran is considered to be the more left-wing. Alongside former leader Nick Clegg and many of the Lib Dems who served in the governing Conservative-Lib Dem coalition of 2010–2015, Davey is associated with the party's right-wing Orange Booker branch. The record of the coalition, which caused a decline in popularity of the Lib Dems after 2015, has been defended by Davey. Conversely, Moran is considered to represent a break from the coalition years.

== Candidates ==
=== Declared ===
The following MPs declared their intention to stand:

Candidate	Born	Political office	Campaign	Announced
Ed Davey	25 December 1965	MP for Kingston and Surbiton (1997–2015, since 2017); Acting leader and Deputy Leader of the Liberal Democrats (since 2019); Secretary of State for Energy and Climate Change (2012–2015); Treasury spokesperson (2019–2020)	Campaign	4 June 2020
Layla Moran	12 September 1982	MP for Oxford West and Abingdon (since 2017); Education spokesperson (since 2017); Digital, culture, media and sport spokesperson (2019–2020)	Campaign	8 March 2020

=== Withdrawn ===
The following MPs declared their intention to stand but later withdrew.

Candidate	Born	Political office	Campaign	Announced	Withdrew
Wera Hobhouse	8 February 1960	MP for Bath (since 2017); Energy and Climate Change spokesperson (2019; since 2020); Environment, Food and Rural Affairs spokesperson (since 2019); Transport spokesperson (2019–2020); Communities and local government spokesperson (2017–2019)	Campaign	5 February 2020	23 June 2020 (endorsed Moran)
Christine Jardine	24 November 1960	MP for Edinburgh West (since 2017); Home affairs & women and equalities spokesperson (since 2019); Justice spokesperson (2019); Work and pensions spokesperson (2019); Scotland spokesperson (2017–2019)		30 January 2020	30 April 2020 (endorsed Davey)

=== Declined ===
- Daisy Cooper, MP for St Albans
- Tim Farron, MP for Westmorland and Lonsdale

== Endorsements ==
Leadership candidates were endorsed by various notable politicians. Former party leader Jo Swinson remained neutral in the campaign.

=== Ed Davey ===
==== Current MPs ====
- Daisy Cooper, MP for St Albans
- Tim Farron, MP for Westmorland and Lonsdale, former Liberal Democrat leader and former party president
- Christine Jardine, MP for Edinburgh West
- Sarah Olney, MP for Richmond Park
- Munira Wilson, MP for Twickenham

==== Peers ====
- Menzies Campbell, peer, former Liberal Democrat leader, former MP for North East Fife
- Dorothy Thornhill, peer and former mayor of Watford
- Jim Wallace, peer, former leader of the Liberal Democrats in the House of Lords, former deputy first minister of Scotland, former leader of the Scottish Liberal Democrats, former MSP for Orkney and former MP for Orkney and Shetland

==== Former MPs ====
- Sarah Wollaston, former MP for Totnes, for the Conservative Party, Change UK, and the Liberal Democrats

==== Former MEPs ====
- Dinesh Dhamija, former MEP for London
- Shaffaq Mohammed, former MEP for Yorkshire and the Humber and Liberal Democrat group leader on Sheffield City Council
- Luisa Porritt, former MEP for London and councillor on Camden Borough Council
- Caroline Voaden, former MEP for South West England
- Irina von Wiese, former MEP for London

==== Other politicians ====
- Siobhan Benita, former candidate for mayor of London
- Caroline Pidgeon, Member of the London Assembly
- Peter Taylor, mayor of Watford

=== Layla Moran ===
==== Current MPs ====
- Wendy Chamberlain, MP for North East Fife
- Wera Hobhouse, MP for Bath
- Jamie Stone, MP for Caithness, Sutherland and Easter Ross

==== Peers ====
- Lynne Featherstone, peer, former MP for Hornsey and Wood Green

==== Former MPs ====
- Martin Horwood, former MP for Cheltenham, former MEP for South West England
- Julian Huppert, former MP for Cambridge
- Stephen Lloyd, former MP for Eastbourne

== Nominations ==
Nominations opened on 24 June. Both of the remaining candidates attained the nominations needed to progress to the membership ballot. The table below lists the number of nominations for each candidate. The total number of MPs represents the eleven Liberal Democrat MPs minus the two leadership candidates and Alistair Carmichael, who as chief whip remained neutral.

Candidate	MPs	Party members	Different local parties of nominating members (Note: Including Young Liberals)
Ed Davey	5 / 8	1,870	343
Layla Moran	3 / 8	1,329	330

== Results ==
Ed Davey was announced as the new leader of the Liberal Democrats on 27 August.This was the largest margin of victory in a contested race since the 1988 leadership election, where Paddy Ashdown won with 71.9% of the vote.

Candidate	Votes	%	
✓ Ed Davey	42,756		63.0
Layla Moran	24,564		36.2
Abstention	540		0.8
Total	67,860	Turnout	57.6

== Aftermath ==
In his victory speech, Davey said that the Liberal Democrats must "wake up and smell the coffee" and "start listening" to ordinary people and those who "don't believe we share their values." He also stressed his experience in the coalition government, and his commitments to tackle climate change. Moran congratulated Davey on Twitter, saying "I look forward to working with him to campaign for a better future for Britain."

Daisy Cooper was subsequently chosen by the Parliamentary Party as their deputy leader.

== See also ==
- 2020 Labour Party leadership election
- 2020 Green Party of England and Wales leadership election
