= Liberal Democrat General Election Cabinet, 2015 =

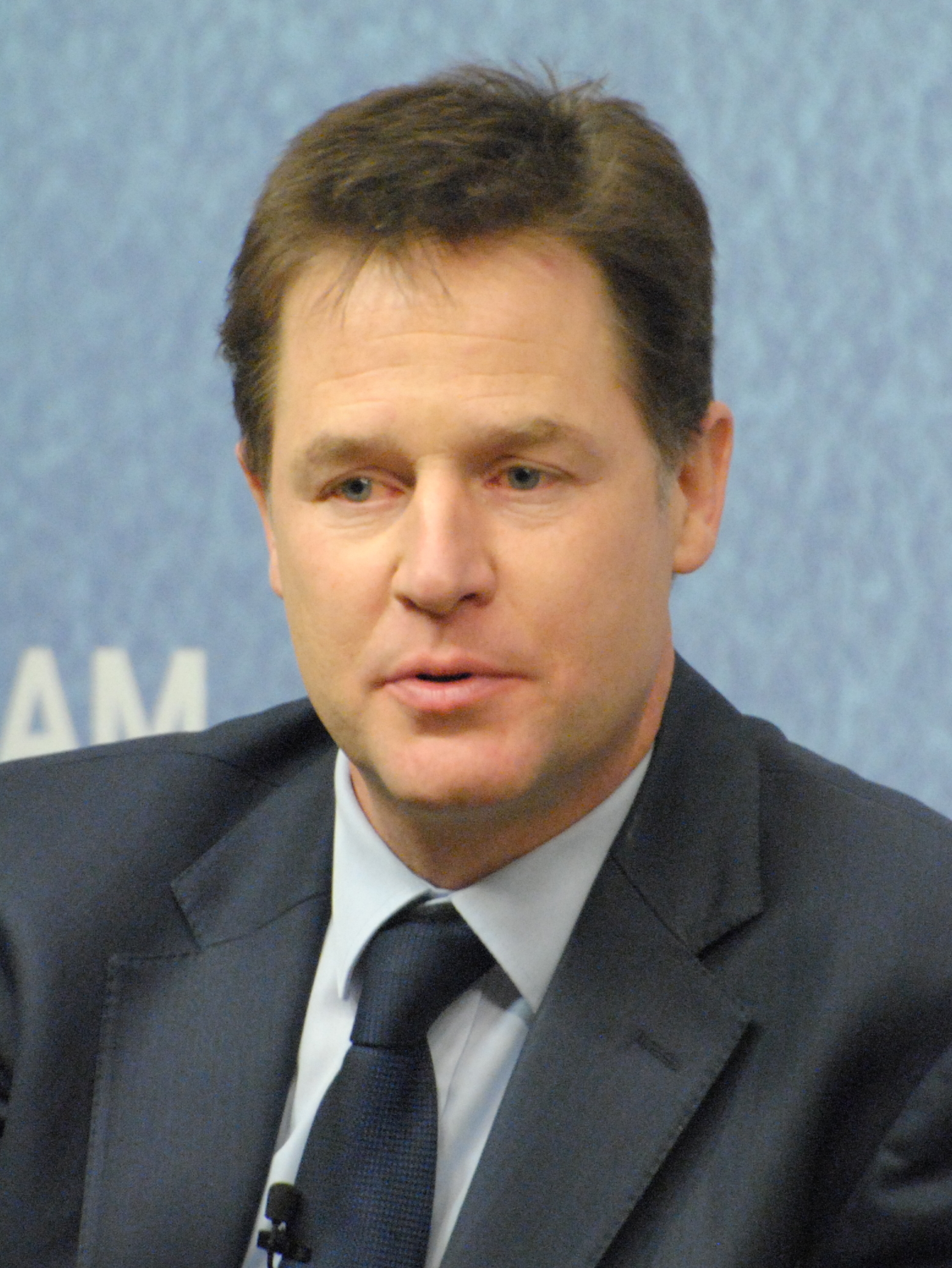
Clegg in 2015

Frontbench Teams since 1997
Ashdown Team (1997–1999)
Kennedy Team (1999–2006)
Campbell Team (2006–2007)
First Cable Team (2007)
Clegg Team (2007–2010)
General Election Cabinet (2015)
Farron Team (2015–2017)
Second Cable Team (2017–2019)
Swinson Team (2019)
Davey Team (2020–present)

While still members of David Cameron's Coalition government, the Liberal Democrat leader and Deputy Prime Minister, Nick Clegg, announced a new frontbench team on 7 January 2015, in advance of that year's general election.

== Membership ==
Portfolio	Name
General Election Cabinet
Leader of the Liberal Democrats	The Rt Hon. Nick Clegg MP
Spokesperson for the Treasury	The Rt Hon. Danny Alexander MP
Spokesperson for Home Affairs	The Rt Hon. Lynne Featherstone MP
Spokesperson for Foreign and Commonwealth Affairs	Tim Farron MP
Spokesperson for Business and Industrial Strategy	The Rt Hon. Vince Cable MP
Spokesperson for Education	The Rt Hon. David Laws MP
Spokesperson for Health	The Rt Hon. Norman Lamb MP
Spokesperson for Energy and Climate Change	The Rt Hon. Ed Davey FRSA MP
Spokesperson for Defence	Sir Nick Harvey MP
Spokesperson for Transport	The Rt Hon. Susan Kramer, Baroness Kramer PC
Spokesperson for Women, Equalities, and Families	Jo Swinson MP
Spokesperson for Europe	The Rt Hon. Michael Moore MP
Spokesperson for Work and Pensions	The Rt Hon. Steve Webb MP
Spokesperson for Communities and Local Government	Stephen Williams MP
Spokesperson for Older People, Ageing, and Care	The Rt Hon. Paul Burstow MP
Spokesperson for Environment, Food and Rural Affairs	Dan Rogerson MP
Spokesperson for International Development	Martin Horwood MP
Spokesperson for Culture, Media and Sport	John Leech MP
Spokesperson for Scotland	The Rt Hon. Alistair Carmichael MP
Spokesperson for Wales	The Rt Hon. Jenny Randerson, Baroness Randerson
Spokesperson for Northern Ireland	Lorely Burt MP
Spokesperson for Justice; Attorney General	The Rt Hon. Simon Hughes MP
Leader of the House of Commons; Spokesperson for London	The Rt Hon. Tom Brake MP
Constitutional and Political Reform; Leader of the House of Lords	The Rt Hon. Jim Wallace, Lord Wallace of Tankerness PC QC
House of Commons Chief Whip	The Rt Hon. Don Foster MP
House of Lords Chief Whip	The Rt Hon. Richard Newby, Lord Newby OBE PC
Parliamentary Private Secretary to the Deputy Prime Minister	Simon Wright MP
Election Campaign Team
Election Committee Chair	The Rt Hon. Paddy Ashdown, Lord Ashdown of Norton-sub-Hamdon GCMG KBE PC
Election Committee Deputy Chair	The Rt Hon. Olly Grender, Baroness Grender MBE
Deputy Leader of the Parliamentary Party	The Rt Hon. Sir Malcolm Bruce Kt MP
President of the Liberal Democrats	The Rt Hon. Sal Brinton, Baroness Brinton
Diversity Engagement Group Chair	The Rt Hon. Navnit Dholakia, Lord Dholakia OBE PC DL
