= Frontbench team of Nick Clegg =

Frontbench Team led by Nick Clegg from 2007 to 2010

- 2007–2010
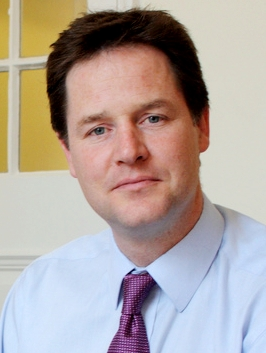
- Clegg in 2009
- Date formed: 18 December 2007
- Date dissolved: 12 May 2010

People and organisations
- Monarch: Elizabeth II
- Leader: Nick Clegg
- Deputy Leader: Vince Cable
- Member party: Liberal Democrats
- Status in legislature: Third party 52 / 651 (8%) Opposition

History
- Incoming formation: 2007 Liberal Democrats leadership election
- Outgoing formation: 2010 United Kingdom government formation
- Predecessor: First Frontbench Team of Vince Cable
- Successor: Liberal Democrat General Election Cabinet, 2015

Frontbench Teams since 1997
Ashdown Team (1997–1999)
Kennedy Team (1999–2006)
Campbell Team (2006–2007)
First Cable Team (2007)
Clegg Team (2007–2010)
General Election Cabinet (2015)
Farron Team (2015–2017)
Second Cable Team (2017–2019)
Swinson Team (2019)
Davey Team (2020–present)

The list that follows is the Frontbench Team led by Nick Clegg from 2007 to 2010, before the Liberal Democrats and Conservatives formed a coalition government following the 2010 general election, and Clegg became Deputy Prime Minister.

== Liberal Democrat Frontbench Team ==
=== Clegg Frontbench Team ===
| Portfolio | Name |
|---|---|
| Leader of the Liberal Democrats | Nick Clegg MP |
| Deputy Leader of the Liberal Democrats; Lib Dem Shadow Chancellor of the Exchequer | Dr Vince Cable MP |
| Lib Dem Shadow Secretary of State for Foreign and Commonwealth Affairs | Edward Davey MP |
| Lib Dem Shadow Secretary of State for the Home Department | Chris Huhne MP |
| Lib Dem Shadow Secretary of State for Justice | David Howarth MP |
| Lib Dem Shadow Leader of the House of Commons | David Heath MP |
| Lib Dem Shadow Secretary of State for Energy and Climate Change | Simon Hughes MP |
| Lib Dem Shadow Secretary of State for Defence | Nick Harvey MP |
| Lib Dem Shadow Secretary of State for Health | Norman Lamb MP |
| Lib Dem Shadow Secretary of State for Work and Pensions | Prof. Steve Webb MP |
| Lib Dem Shadow Secretary of State for Environment, Food and Rural Affairs | Tim Farron MP |
| Lib Dem Shadow Secretary of State for Children, Schools and Families | David Laws MP |
| Lib Dem Shadow Secretary of State for Innovation, Universities and Skills | Stephen Williams MP |
| Lib Dem Shadow Minister for Housing | Sarah Teather MP |
| Lib Dem Shadow Secretary of State for Transport | Norman Baker MP |
| Lib Dem Shadow Secretary of State for Culture, Media and Sport | Don Foster MP |
| Lib Dem Shadow Secretary of State for Communities and Local Government | Julia Goldsworthy MP |
| Lib Dem Shadow Secretary of State for Business, Enterprise and Regulatory Reform | John Thurso MP |
| Party Leader's Chief of Staff and Chairman of the Manifesto group | Danny Alexander MP |
| Lib Dem Shadow Chancellor of the Duchy of Lancaster | Jenny Willott MP |
| Lib Dem Shadow Secretary of State for International Development | Michael Moore MP |
| Lib Dem Shadow Secretary of State for Wales | Roger Williams MP |
| Lib Dem Shadow Secretary of State for Scotland; Secretary of State for Northern Ireland | Alistair Carmichael MP |
| Lib Dem Shadow Chief Secretary to the Treasury | Jeremy Browne MP |
| Lib Dem Spokesperson for Youth and Equality | Lynne Featherstone MP |
| Lib Dem Chief Whip | Paul Burstow MP |
| Parliamentary Private Secretary to the Leader | Mark Hunter MP |
| Chairman of the Parliamentary Party | Lorely Burt MP |
| Chairman of Campaigns and Communications | Willie Rennie MP |
| Leader of the Liberal Democrats in the House of Lords | Tom McNally, Baron McNally |

=== Other Liberal Democrat Spokespeople ===
Whips office
| Leader of the House of Commons | Simon Hughes |
| Leader of the House of Lords | Lord McNally |
| Chief Whip in the Commons | Paul Burstow |
| Deputy Whips in the Commons | Adrian Sanders |
| Deputy Whips in the Commons | Sir Robert Smith |
| Other Whips in the Commons | Paul Keetch |
| Other Whips in the Commons | Dan Rogerson |
| Other Whips in the Commons | Paul Rowen |
| Other Whips in the Commons | Willie Rennie |
| Other Whips in the Commons | Bob Russell |
| Other Whips in the Commons | Roger Williams |
| Chief Whip in the Lords | David Shutt, Baron Shutt of Greetland |
| Deputy Whips in the Lords | Dominic Hubbard, 6th Baron Addington |
| Other Whips in the Lords | Angela Harris, Baroness Harris of Richmond |
| Other Whips in the Lords | Lord Lee of Trafford |
| Other Whips in the Lords | Roger Roberts, Baron Roberts of Llandudno |
| Other Whips in the Lords | Lord Teverson |

Business, Enterprise and Regulatory Reform
| Business, Enterprise and Regulatory Reform | John Thurso |
| Business, Enterprise and Regulatory Reform | Lorely Burt |
| Business, Enterprise and Regulatory Reform | Lord Razzall |
| Small Businesses | Lord Cotter |
| Energy | Lord Redesdale |
| Energy | Lord Sharman |
| Energy | Lord Vallance of Tummel |

Children, Schools and Families
| Children, Schools and Families | David Laws |
| Children, Young People and Families | Annette Brooke |
| Education and Children | Baroness Walmsley |
| Education and Children | Baroness Garden |

Communities and Local Government
| Communities and Local Government | Julia Goldsworthy |
| Communities and Local Government | Baroness Scott of Needham Market |
| Housing | Sarah Teather |
| Regional and Local Government | Baroness Hamwee |
| Planning | Lord Burnett |
| Planning | Lord Greaves |
| Communities | Lord Dholakia |

Home Affairs
| Home Affairs | Chris Huhne |
| Home Affairs | Tom Brake |
| Home Affairs | Baroness Miller of Chilthorne Domer |
| Penal Reform | Baroness Linklater of Butterstone |
| Police | Baroness Harris of Richmond |

Legal Affairs
| Lord Chancellor | Chris Huhne (until January 2009) |
| Lord Chancellor | David Howarth (from January 2009) |
| Shadow Attorney General | Lord Thomas of Gresford |
| Shadow Solicitor General | David Howarth (from January 2009) |

Culture, Media and Sport
| Culture, Media & Sport | Don Foster |
| Culture, Media & Sport | Lord Clement-Jones |
| London and the Olympics | Tom Brake |
| London and the Olympics | Richard Younger-Ross |
| Sport | Lord Addington |
| Tourism | Lord Lee of Trafford |
| Tourism | Baroness Bonham-Carter of Yarnbury |

Defence
| Nick Harvey |
| Willie Rennie |
| Bob Russell |
| Lord Lee of Trafford |
| Lord Addington |

Environment, Food and Rural Affairs
| Environment, Food and Rural Affairs | Tim Farron |
| Environment, Food and Rural Affairs | Martin Horwood |
| Environment, Food and Rural Affairs | Roger Williams |
| Environment, Food and Rural Affairs | Lord Teverson |
| Agriculture | Lord Redesdale |
| CAP Reform | Lord Dykes |
| CAP Reform | Lord Greaves |

Foreign Affairs
| Foreign Affairs | Ed Davey |
| Foreign Affairs | Jo Swinson |
| Foreign Affairs | Lord Wallace of Saltaire |
| Africa | Lord Avebury |
| Europe | Lord Dykes |

Health
| Norman Lamb |
| Sandra Gidley |
| Greg Mulholland |
| Baroness Barker |
| Baroness Tonge |
| Lord Carlile of Berriew (Mental Health and Disability) |

== See also ==
- Cabinet of the United Kingdom
- Official Opposition Shadow Cabinet (UK)
