= First Frontbench team of Vince Cable =

Liberal Democrats Frontbench Team/Shadow Cabinet led by Vince Cable

- 2007–2007
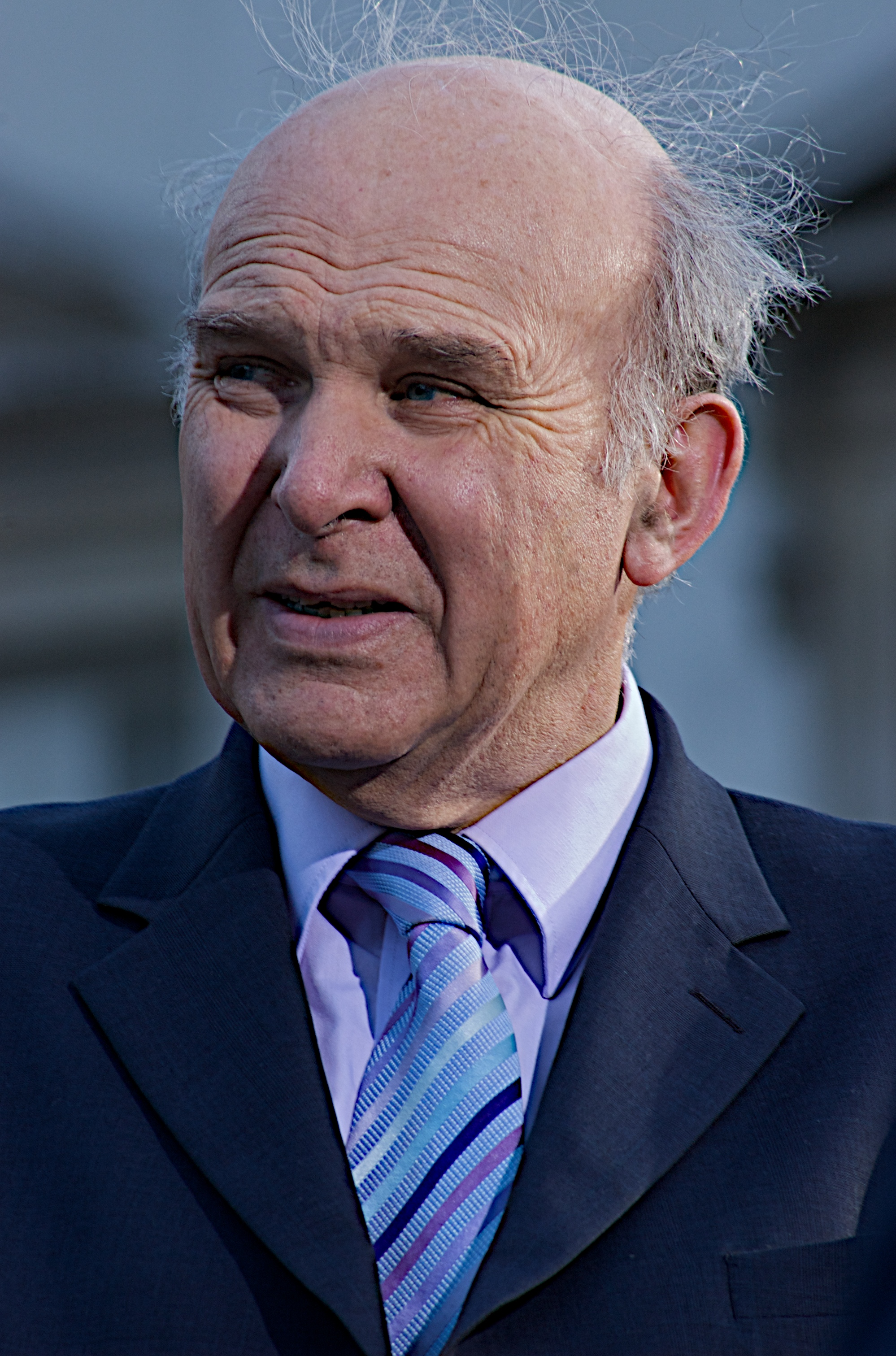
- Date formed: 15 October 2007
- Date dissolved: 18 December 2007

People and organisations
- Monarch: Elizabeth II
- Leader: Vince Cable
- Member party: Liberal Democrats
- Status in legislature: Third party 52 / 651 (8%) Opposition

History
- Incoming formation: Resignation of Menzies Campbell
- Outgoing formation: 2007 Liberal Democrats leadership election
- Predecessor: Frontbench Team of Menzies Campbell
- Successor: Frontbench Team of Nick Clegg

Frontbench Teams since 1997
Ashdown Team (1997–1999)
Kennedy Team (1999–2006)
Campbell Team (2006–2007)
First Cable Team (2007)
Clegg Team (2007–2010)
General Election Cabinet (2015)
Farron Team (2015–2017)
Second Cable Team (2017–2019)
Swinson Team (2019)
Davey Team (2020–present)

The list that follows is the Liberal Democrats Frontbench Team/Shadow Cabinet led by Vince Cable, who was acting leader between 15 October and 18 December 2007, following the resignation of Menzies Campbell and prior to the election of Nick Clegg.

== Liberal Democrat Frontbench Team ==
=== Frontbench Team of Vince Cable ===
| Portfolio | Name |
|---|---|
| Acting Leader of the Liberal Democrats; Treasury | Vince Cable MP |
| Foreign and Commonwealth Affairs | Michael Moore MP |
| Health | Norman Lamb MP |
| Home Affairs | Nick Clegg MP |
| Defence | Nick Harvey MP |
| Environment | Chris Huhne MP |
| Transport | Susan Kramer MP |
| Shadow Leader of the House of Commons; Party President | Simon Hughes MP |
| Justice | David Heath MP |
| Innovation, Universities and Skills | Sarah Teather MP |
| Culture, Media and Sport | Don Foster MP |
| Communities and Local Government | Andrew Stunell MP |
| Housing | Paul Holmes MP |
| Work and Pensions | Danny Alexander MP |
| Business, Enterprise and Regulatory Reform | Lembit Öpik MP |
| International Development | Lynne Featherstone MP |
| Northern Ireland and Scotland | Alistair Carmichael MP |
| Wales | Roger Williams MP |
| Cabinet Office; Duchy of Lancaster | Norman Baker MP |
| Shadow Chief Secretary to the Treasury | Julia Goldsworthy MP |
| Chief Whip | Paul Burstow MP |
| Chair of Campaigns and Communications | Edward Davey MP |
| Chair of the Manifesto Group | Steve Webb MP |
| Parliamentary Private Secretary to the Leader | vacant |
| Chair of the Parliamentary Party | Lorely Burt MP |
| Leader of the Party in the House of Lords | The Rt. Hon. The Lord McNally |
| Office of the Attorney General | The Rt. Hon. The Lord Thomas of Gresford |
| Office of the Solicitor General | David Howarth MP |

=== Other Liberal Democrat Spokespeople ===
| Portfolio | Name |
|---|---|
| Treasury | Colin Breed |
| Foreign Affairs | Mark Hunter |
| Home Affairs | Jeremy Browne |
| Home Affairs | Tim Farron |
| DEFRA Team | Martin Horwood (Environment) |
| DEFRA Team | Roger Williams (Rural Affairs) |
| Health | John Pugh |
| Health | Sandra Gidley |
| House of Commons | Sir Robert Smith |
| Transport | John Leech |
| Business, Enterprise and Regulatory Reform | Lorely Burt |
| Women and Equality | Jo Swinson |
| Defence | Bob Russell |
| Defence | Willie Rennie |
| Work and Pensions | Paul Rowen |
| Northern Ireland and Scotland | Alan Reid |
| International Development | John Barrett |
| Wales | Mark Williams |
| Communities and Local Government | Jo Swinson |
| Communities and Local Government | Tom Brake |
| Culture, Media and Sport | Tom Brake |
| Culture, Media and Sport | Dan Rogerson (Arts, Culture and Heritage) |
| Culture, Media and Sport | Richard Younger-Ross |
| Children, Schools and Families | Annette Brooke |
| Schools | Greg Mulholland |
| Innovation, Universities and Skills | Evan Harris |
| Deputy Whips | Adrian Sanders |
| Deputy Whips | Jenny Willott |
| Chair of the Parliamentary Party | Paul Holmes |
| London and the Olympics | Tom Brake |
| Leader's Parliamentary Private Secretary | Tim Farron |

=== Liberal Democrats House of Lords Frontbench Team ===
Liberal Democrat peers are also organised into teams broadly corresponding to the areas of Government departments.

| Portfolio | Name |
|---|---|
| Leader in the House of Lords | The Lord McNally |
| Deputy Leaders in the House of Lords | The Lord Dholakia |
| Deputy Leaders in the House of Lords | The Lord Wallace of Saltaire |
| Chief Whip in the House of Lords | David Shutt |
| Home Affairs | Baroness Miller of Chilthorne Domer |
| Health | The Baroness Barker |
| Foreign Affairs | The Lord Wallace of Saltaire |
| Europe | The Lord Dykes |
| Defence | vacant |
| Environment, Food & Rural Affairs | The Baroness Miller of Chilthorne Domer |
| Northern Ireland | The Lord Smith of Clifton |
| Trade and Industry | The Lord Razzall |
| Transport | The Lord Bradshaw |
| International Development | Lindsay Northover |
| International Development | The Lord Roberts of Llandudno |
| Culture, Media & Sport | The Lord Clement-Jones |
| Culture, Media & Sport | The Baroness Bonham Carter of Yarnbury |
| Shadow Lord Chancellor | The Lord Goodhart |

== See also ==
- Cabinet of the United Kingdom
- Official Opposition Shadow Cabinet (UK)
