= Frontbench Team of Vince Cable =

Frontbench Team of Vince Cable may refer to:

- First Frontbench Team of Vince Cable (2007)
- Second Frontbench Team of Vince Cable (2017–19)
