= Liberal Democrat Foreign Affairs spokesperson =

The Liberal Democrat Foreign Affairs spokesperson is the spokesperson for the Liberal Democrats, a British political party, on matters relating to the work of the Foreign Secretary and Foreign, Commonwealth and Development Office. The office holder is a member of the Liberal Democrat frontbench team. The post exists when the Liberal Democrats are in opposition, but not when they in government, for example during the Cameron–Clegg coalition.

== List of Foreign Affairs spokespersons ==
Name	Portrait	Took office	Left office	Frontbench team
Russell Johnston		March 1988	June 1989	Steel Maclennan
Russell Johnston		March 1988	June 1989	Ashdown
David Steel		July 1989	May 1992	Ashdown
Menzies Campbell		7 May 1992	2 March 2006	Ashdown
Menzies Campbell		7 May 1992	2 March 2006	Kennedy
Michael Moore		10 March 2006	20 December 2007	Campbell
Michael Moore		10 March 2006	20 December 2007	Cable (acting)
Ed Davey		18 December 2007	11 May 2010	Clegg
Vacant – Liberal Democrats part of the Cameron–Clegg coalition (Note: Menzies Campbell served on the Foreign Affairs Select Committee between 2010 and 2015, Jeremy Browne served as Minister of State for Europe and the Americas between 2010 and 2012 and Lynne Featherstone served as Parliamentary Under-Secretary of State for International Development between 2012 and 2014.)		11 May 2010	7 January 2015	–
Tim Farron		7 January 2015	8 May 2015	Clegg's General Election Cabinet
Tom Brake		29 July 2015	16 June 2017	Farron
Jo Swinson		16 June 2017	21 August 2019	Farron
Jo Swinson		16 June 2017	21 August 2019	Cable
Chuka Umunna		21 August 2019	6 November 2019	Swinson
Alistair Carmichael		6 January 2020	7 September 2020	Davey (acting)
Layla Moran		7 September 2020	18 September 2024	Davey
Calum Miller		18 September 2024	Incumbent	Davey

== Spokespersons for Foreign Affairs in the House of Lords ==
Name	Portrait	Took office	Left office
Baroness Northover		28 October 2016	6 October 2021
Lord Purvis of Tweed		7 October 2021	Incumbent
