= Frontbench team of Tim Farron =

Frontbench Team of Tim Farron
- 2015–2017
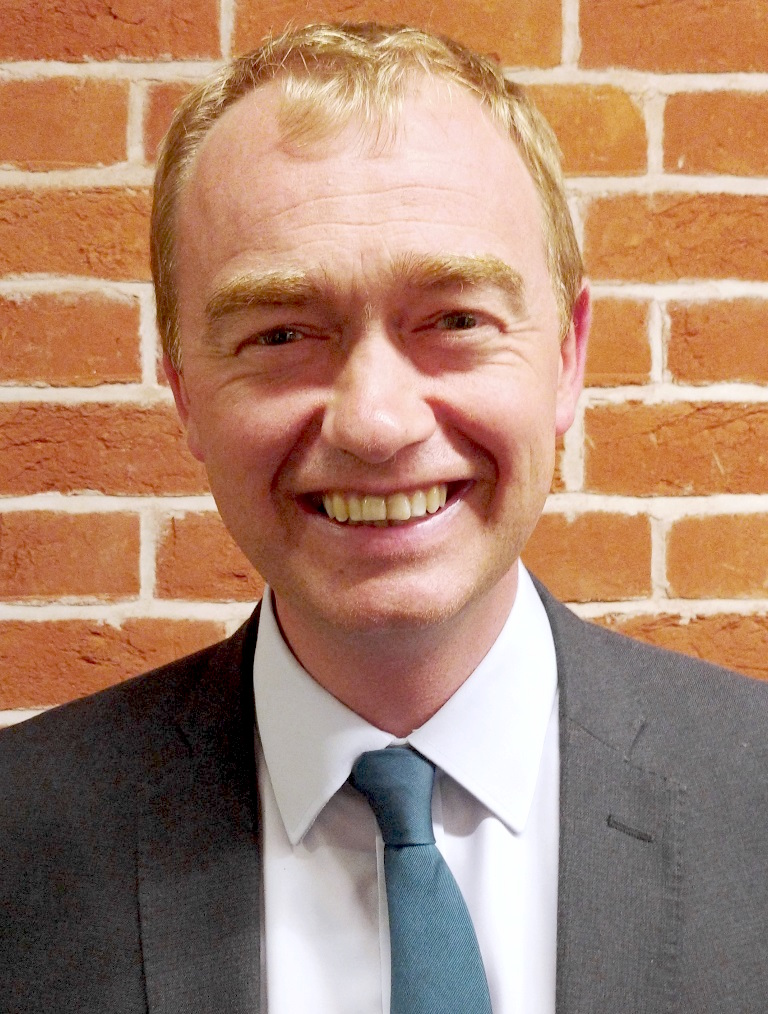
- Date formed: 16 July 2015
- Date dissolved: 20 July 2017

People and organisations
- Monarch: Elizabeth II
- Leader: Tim Farron
- Deputy Leader: Jo Swinson (2017)
- Member party: Liberal Democrats
- Status in legislature: Fourth party 8 / 650 (1%) (2015-2017); Fourth party 12 / 650 (2%) (2017)

History
- Incoming formation: 2015 leadership election
- Outgoing formation: 2017 leadership election
- Election: 2017 election
- Legislature terms: 2015 UK Parliament; 2017 UK Parliament
- Predecessor: Liberal Democrat General Election Cabinet, 2015
- Successor: Second Frontbench Team of Vince Cable

Tim Farron succeeded Nick Clegg as Leader of the Liberal Democrats on 29 July 2015, unveiling his Frontbench Team shortly afterwards. Farron conducted his first reshuffle on 28 October 2016. A second reshuffle was conducted on 8 May 2017. In July of the same year Farron resigned and was succeeded by Vince Cable.

== Frontbench history ==
=== July 2015 – October 2016 ===
Portfolio	Holder
Leader of the Liberal Democrats	Tim Farron MP
Economics	Baroness Kramer
Foreign Affairs; Chief Whip; Shadow Leader of the House of Commons	Tom Brake MP
Home Affairs	Alistair Carmichael MP
Home Affairs	Lord Paddick
Defence	Baroness Jolly
Health	Norman Lamb MP
Education	John Pugh MP
Work and Pensions	Baroness Manzoor
Business	Baroness Burt of Solihull
Energy and Climate Change	Baroness Featherstone
Local Government	Mayor of Watford, Baroness Thornhill
Transport	Baroness Randerson
Environment and Rural Affairs	Baroness Parminter
International Development	Baroness Northover
Culture, Media and Sport	Baroness Bonham-Carter of Yarnbury
Equalities	Baroness Hussein-Ece
Justice; Shadow Attorney General	Lord Marks of Henley-on-Thames
Northern Ireland	Lord Alderdice
Scotland; Leader of the Scottish Liberal Democrats	Willie Rennie MSP
Wales; Leader of the Welsh Liberal Democrats	Kirsty Williams MS
Leader of the Liberal Democrats in the House of Lords	Lord Wallace of Tankerness
Lords Chief Whip	Lord Newby
Campaigns Chair	Greg Mulholland MP
Grassroots Campaigns	Tim Pickstone, Chair of the Association of Liberal Democrat Councillors

=== October 2016 – May 2017 ===
Portfolio	Holder
Leader of the Liberal Democrats	Tim Farron MP
Shadow First Secretary of State	Alistair Carmichael MP
Home Affairs	Alistair Carmichael MP
Home Affairs	Lord Paddick
Treasury	Baroness Kramer
Foreign Affairs; Shadow Leader of the House of Commons; Chief Whip	Tom Brake MP
Brexit; International Trade	Nick Clegg MP
Defence	Baroness Jolly
Health	Norman Lamb MP
Work and Pensions	Baroness Bakewell of Hardington Mandeville
Business and Industrial Strategy	Lord Foster
Energy and Climate Change	Baroness Featherstone
Education	John Pugh MP
Equalities	Baroness Burt
Justice	Lord Marks of Henley-on-Thames
Environment, Food and Rural Affair	Baroness Burt of Solihull
International Development	Baroness Sheehan
Communities and Local Government	Baroness Pinnock
Transport	Baroness Randerson
Culture, Media and Sport	Baroness Bonham-Carter of Yarnbury
Leader of the Liberal Democrats in the House of Lords	Lord Newby
Lords Chief Whip	Lord Stoneham of Droxford
London	Caroline Pidgeon AM
Brexit	Baroness Ludford
Northern Ireland	Baroness Suttie
Other spokespersons
Leader of the Scottish Liberal Democrats	Willie Rennie MSP
Leader of the Welsh Liberal Democrats	Mark Williams MP
Leader of the Liberal Democrats in the European Parliament	Catherine Bearder MEP
Foreign and Commonwealth Affairs	Baroness Northover
International Trade	Lord Purvis of Tweed
Health	Baroness Walmsley
Education	Lord Storey
Scotland	Lord Bruce of Bennachie
Wales	Baroness Humphreys
Cabinet Office	Lord Wallace of Saltaire
Political and Constitutional Reform	Lord Tyler
Housing	Lord Shipley
Shadow Attorney General	Lord Thomas

=== June – July 2017 ===
Portfolio	Holder
Leader of the Liberal Democrats	Tim Farron MP
Shadow First Secretary of State; Brexit; International Trade	Tom Brake MP
Deputy Leader of the Liberal Democrats; Foreign Affairs	Jo Swinson MP
Treasury	Sir Vince Cable MP
Home Affairs	Sir Ed Davey MP
Defence	Baroness Jolly
Health	Norman Lamb MP
Work and Pensions	Stephen Lloyd MP
Business and Industrial Strategy	The Baroness Kramer
Business and Industrial Strategy	The Lord Fox
Energy and Climate Change	Baroness Featherstone
Education; Young People	Layla Moran MP
Equalities	Baroness Burt
Justice	Lord Marks of Henley-on-Thames
Environment, Food and Rural Affair	Baroness Parminter
International Development	Baroness Sheehan
Communities and Local Government; Refugees	Wera Hobhouse MP
Transport	Baroness Randerson
Culture, Media and Sport	Christine Jardine MP
Leader of the Liberal Democrats in the House of Lords	Lord Newby
Lords Chief Whip	Ben Stoneham, Baron Stoneham of Droxford
London	Caroline Pidgeon AM
Brexit	Baroness Ludford
Northern Ireland; Scotland; Chief Whip; Shadow Leader of the House	Alistair Carmichael MP
Wales	The Baroness Humphreys of Llanrwst
Other spokesperson
Leader of the Scottish Liberal Democrats	Willie Rennie MSP
Leader of the Welsh Liberal Democrats	Kirsty Williams MS
Leader of the Liberal Democrats in the European Parliament	Catherine Bearder MEP
Young People	Daisy Cooper

== See also ==
- Cabinet of the United Kingdom
- Official Opposition Shadow Cabinet (UK)
