= 1999 Liberal Democrats leadership election =

- 9 August 1999
- Turnout: 51,006 (62%) ▼10.1%
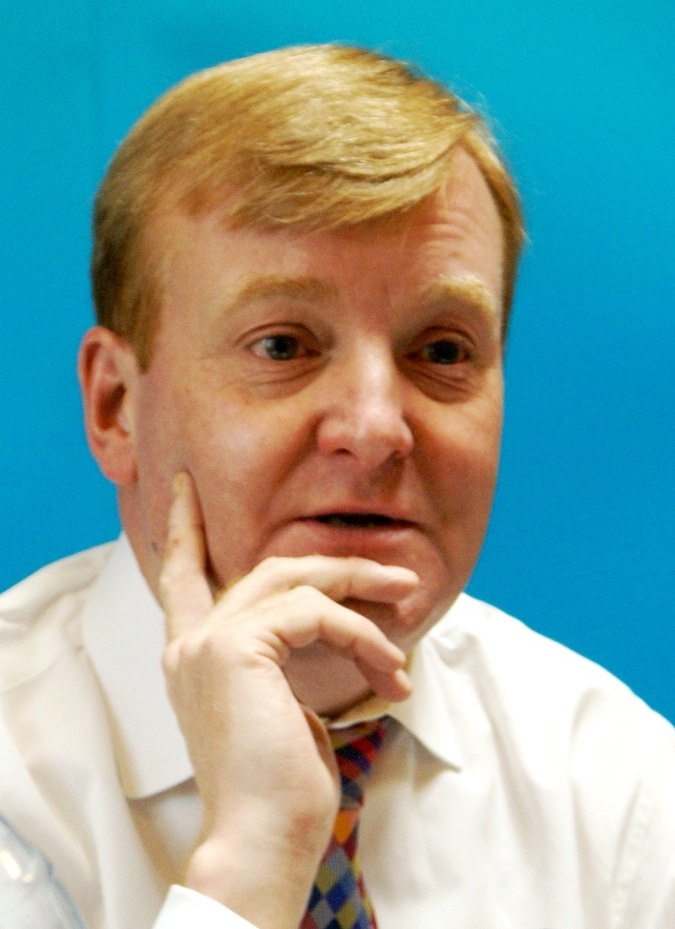

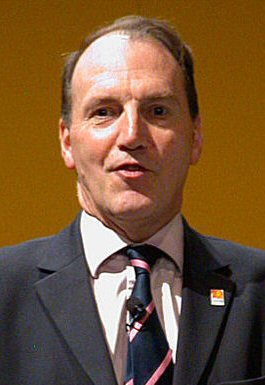

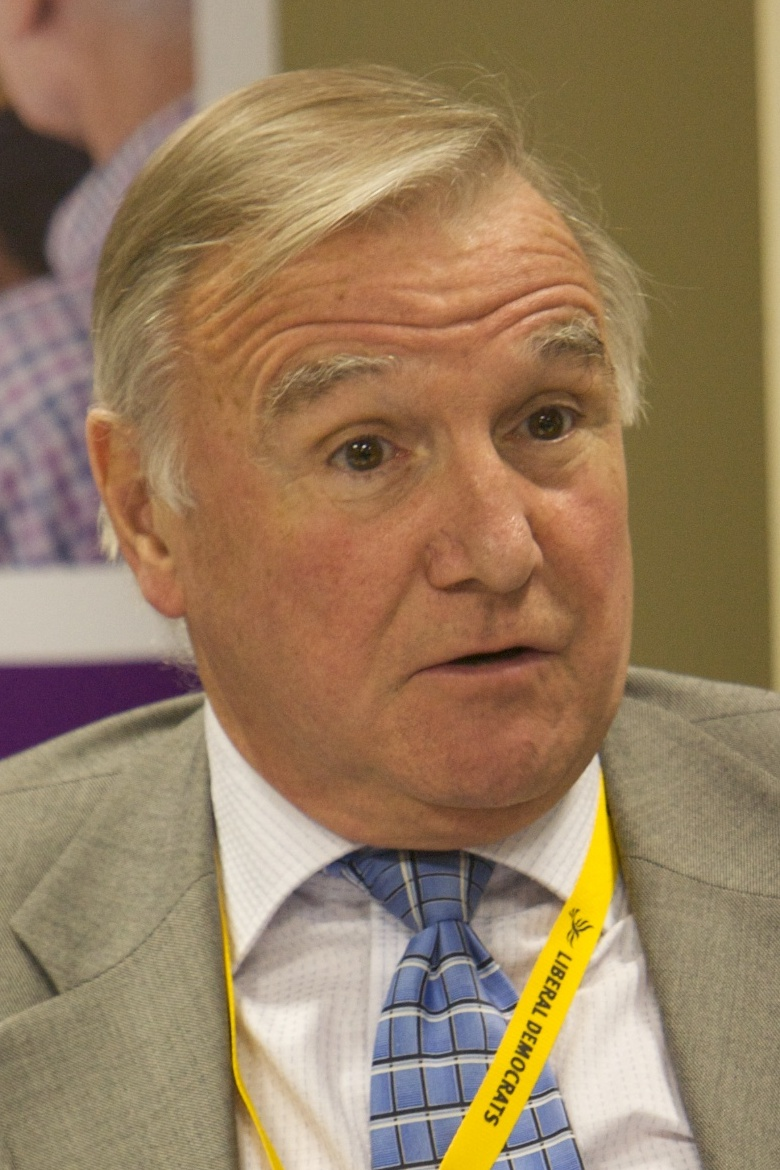

| Candidate | Charles Kennedy | Simon Hughes | Malcolm Bruce |
| First round | 22,724 (44.6%) | 16,233 (31.8%) | 4,643 (9.1%) |
| Second round | 28,425 (56.6%) | 21,833 (43.4%) | Eliminated |
| Candidate | Jackie Ballard | David Rendel |
| First round | 3,978 (7.8%) | 3,428 (6.7%) |
| Second round | Eliminated | Eliminated |
Leader before election
Paddy Ashdown
Elected Leader
Charles Kennedy

The 1999 Liberal Democrats leadership election was called following the resignation of Paddy Ashdown as Leader of the Liberal Democrats. There were five candidates and all members of the party were balloted using the Alternative Vote preference system. The election was won by Charles Kennedy, who served as leader until his resignation in 2006.

The chief issue in the election was whether the party should continue its partial collaboration with the Labour Party, which had seen Ashdown and other senior Liberal Democrats appointed to a joint Cabinet committee on electoral reform. Most of the candidates were to various degrees sceptical about this approach, with Simon Hughes the most hostile and Charles Kennedy the strongest defender of Ashdown. The campaign was almost entirely free of bitterness and outspoken comments. Kennedy was generally favoured by the press because of his name recognition, which derived from his frequent appearances on light-hearted panel games on television.

== Candidates ==
=== Jackie Ballard ===
Supporters included:

- MPs: Peter Brand, Jenny Tonge.
- Peers: Eric Avebury, Liz Barker, Sally Hamwee, Angie Harris, Sarah Ludford, Susan Miller, Conrad Russell, Susan Thomas.
- MEPs: Sarah Ludford.
- MSPs: Iain Smith, Margaret Smith.
- Other: Cllr Tony Greaves.

=== Malcolm Bruce ===
Supporters included:

- MPs: Ed Davey, Evan Harris

=== Simon Hughes ===
Supporters included:

- MPs: Tom Brake, Steve Webb.
- Peers: Tim Beaumont, Margaret Sharp.
- MEPs: Graham Watson.
- MSPs: Robert Brown.
- Welsh AMs: Peter Black.
- Former MPs: Cyril Smith.

=== Charles Kennedy ===
Supporters included:

- MPs: Colin Breed, John Burnett, Vince Cable, Menzies Campbell, David Chidgey, Brian Cotter, Ronnie Fearn, Don Foster, Andrew George, Mike Hancock, Nick Harvey, Nigel Jones, Paul Keetch, Archie Kirkwood, Richard Livsey, Robert Maclennan, Ray Michie, Michael Moore, Mark Oaten, Lembit Öpik, Matthew Taylor (campaign manager), Paul Tyler, Phil Willis, Jim Wallace.
- Peers: Dominic Addington, John Alderdice, William Bradshaw, Navnit Dholakia, William Goodhart, Tim Clement-Jones, Richard Holme, Roy Jenkins, Russell Johnston, Anthony Lester, Veronica Linklater, Tom McNally, Emma Nicholson, Dick Newby, Tim Razzall, Rupert Redesdale, Dick Taverne, George Thomson, John Thurso, Alan Watson, Shirley Williams.
- MEPs: Nick Clegg, Andrew Duff, Chris Huhne, Emma Nicholson, Diana Wallis.
- MSPs: Ian Jenkins, George Lyon, John Farquhar Munro, Keith Raffan, Tavish Scott, Nicol Stephen, Jamie Stone, Jim Wallace.
- Welsh AMs: Kirsty Williams.
- Other: Jane Bonham Carter, Richard Grayson, Gordon Lishman, Lindsay Granshaw, Matthew Oakeshott, Cllr Mike Storey.

=== David Rendel ===
Supporters included:

- MPs: Donald Gorrie, Adrian Sanders.
- Other: Cllr Sal Brinton, Cllr Dave Hodgson.

=== Withdrew from the contest ===
The following Liberal Democrat politicians initially stood but subsequently withdrew from the election:

- Don Foster

Supporters included:

- MPs: Mark Oaten (Campaign manager), Lembit Öpik.

== Results ==
First round
| Candidate | Change | Votes | % |
|---|---|---|---|
| Charles Kennedy | — | 22,724 | 44.6 |
| Simon Hughes | — | 16,233 | 31.8 |
| Malcolm Bruce | — | 4,643 | 9.1 |
| Jackie Ballard | — | 3,978 | 7.8 |
| David Rendel | — | 3,428 | 6.7 |
| Turnout | | 51,006 | 62 |
Rendel eliminated, second count required

As a result of the first round, Rendel was eliminated. Those of his votes that includes further preferences were redistributed (transferred) to the remaining four candidates.

Second round
| Candidate | Change | Votes | % |
|---|---|---|---|
| Charles Kennedy | +895 | 23,619 | 46.5 |
| Simon Hughes | +1,145 | 17,378 | 34.2 |
| Malcolm Bruce | +598 | 5,241 | 10.3 |
| Jackie Ballard | +627 | 4,605 | 9.1 |
| David Rendel | −3,428 | — | — |
| Not transferable | +163 | 163 | — |
Ballard eliminated, third count required

As a result of the second round, Ballard was eliminated. Those of her votes that includes further preferences were redistributed to the remaining three candidates.

Third round
| Candidate | Change | Votes | % |
|---|---|---|---|
| Charles Kennedy | +1,545 | 25,164 | 49.7 |
| Simon Hughes | +1,982 | 19,360 | 38.3 |
| Malcolm Bruce | +827 | 6,068 | 12.0 |
| Jackie Ballard | −4,605 | — | — |
| Not transferable | +251 | 414 | — |
Bruce eliminated, fourth count required

As a result of the third round, Bruce was eliminated. Those of his votes that includes further preferences were redistributed to the remaining two candidates.

Final round
| Candidate | Change | Votes | % |
|---|---|---|---|
| Charles Kennedy | +3,261 | 28,425 | 56.6 |
| Simon Hughes | +2,473 | 21,833 | 43.4 |
| Malcolm Bruce | −6,068 | — | — |
| Not transferable | +334 | 748 | — |
Charles Kennedy elected
