= Liberal Democrat frontbench team =

Frontbench in the British Parliament of the Liberal Democrat Party

Frontbench Teams since 1997
Ashdown Team (1997–1999)
Kennedy Team (1999–2006)
Campbell Team (2006–2007)
First Cable Team (2007)
Clegg Team (2007–2010)
General Election Cabinet (2015)
Farron Team (2015–2017)
Second Cable Team (2017–2019)
Swinson Team (2019)
Davey Team (2020–present)

The Liberal Democrats are a political party in the United Kingdom. While in opposition, the Leader of the Liberal Democrats appoints a frontbench team of members of Parliament (MPs), peers in the House of Lords, members of the Scottish Parliament (MSPs), and members of the Senedd (MSs) to speak for the party on different issues. Their areas of responsibility broadly corresponded to those of Government ministers. The frontbench team is divided into departmental sub-units, the principal ones being the economy, foreign policy, and home affairs. Sometimes the frontbench team consists of more than just the principal positions.

== Status ==
Formerly, the Liberal Democrats' frontbench team did not use the term 'shadow cabinet', with assorted frontbench spokespeople covering areas (e.g., Defence and Foreign Affairs) rather than directly shadowing specific Cabinet portfolios. Under Charles Kennedy's leadership, and with the number of Liberal Democrat MPs growing following the 1997 general election, the senior members of the frontbench team began referring to themselves as a Shadow Cabinet. This was controversial, because in the two-party political system that dominated UK politics in the 20th century, the term 'Shadow Cabinet' referred to senior members of the frontbench team of the largest single opposition party in the House of Commons. This party, known as the Official Opposition, has constitutional status, although its Shadow Cabinet does not. Following Kennedy's decision to change the nomenclature, the UK Parliament's website used for a time the term 'Liberal Democrat Shadow Cabinet' in place of the old term 'Frontbench Team'.

This is not without contention, and was disputed by the Conservative Party, who were then the Official Opposition to a Labour government. However, the official listing at the Parliament website is explicit in using the term 'Shadow Cabinet'. In 2001, Chancellor of the Exchequer Gordon Brown said the following in the House of Commons:

The House of Commons is in the unique position of having two shadow Chancellors: one [Conservative Michael Howard] sits in Folkestone and the other [Liberal Democrat Matthew Taylor] in Truro. It is rather like the mediaeval papacy: two hon. Members claim to hold the position of shadow Chancellor. I shall organise a play-off during the year.

Later in his chancellorship, Brown returned to this theme, comparing his frosty relationship with the official Shadow Chancellor George Osborne with his apparently warm relationship with Vince Cable (whom he referred to as "the Shadow Chancellor from Twickenham").

The Official Opposition receives support for its official function which is denied to smaller opposition parties, although they, along with every parliamentary party, do receive Short Money. While the Opposition Leader and Chief Whips draw salaries, their counterparts in smaller opposition parties do not. The Official Opposition also has the exclusive use of facilities within Parliament.

Following the 2010 general election and the confirmation of Conservative leader David Cameron as Prime Minister on 11 May 2010, a coalition cabinet was formed that included Liberal Democrat ministers, including Liberal leader Nick Clegg as Deputy Prime Minister and Lord President of the Council. Thus, the Liberal Democrats entered the Cabinet for the first time since the all-party War Government led by Winston Churchill in the early 1940s.

Following the 2015 general election, the Liberal Democrats were reduced to just eight seats in the House of Commons, falling into joint fourth place with the Democratic Unionist Party behind the Scottish National Party (SNP) for the first time. As a result of this, Parliament's website listed the SNP's frontbench team (in comparison with the Conservative Cabinet and Labour Shadow Cabinet) in lieu of the Liberal Democrat frontbench team. The Liberal Democrats returned as the third largest party following the 2024 general election, behind the Conservatives (the official opposition) and Labour (the governing party).

== Previous frontbench teams ==
Previous team key-members in summary:

Party	Date	Leader	Treasury	Foreign affairs	Home affairs
Liberal	April 1966	Jo Grimond	Richard Wainwright	James Davidson	Unknown
Liberal	January 1967	Jeremy Thorpe	Richard Wainwright	James Davidson	Unknown
Liberal	June 1970	Jeremy Thorpe	John Pardoe	Russell Johnston	Unknown
Liberal	1975	Jeremy Thorpe	John Pardoe	David Steel	Unknown
Liberal	May 1976	Jo Grimond	John Pardoe	David Steel	Unknown
Liberal	July 1976	David Steel	John Pardoe	Jeremy Thorpe	Unknown
Liberal	1977	David Steel	John Pardoe	Jeremy Thorpe	Emlyn Hooson
Liberal	May 1979	David Steel	Richard Wainwright	Russell Johnston	
Liberal	October 1981	David Steel	Richard Wainwright	Russell Johnston	Bill Pitt
Liberal	June 1983	David Steel	Richard Wainwright	Russell Johnston	
Liberal	1985	David Steel	David Penhaligon	Alan Beith	
Liberal	January 1987	David Steel		Alan Beith	
Liberal	June 1987	David Steel	Alan Beith	Russell Johnston	
Liberal; Democrats	March 1988	David Steel and Robert Maclennan (co-leaders)	Alan Beith	Russell Johnston	Robert Maclennan
Liberal; Democrats	July 1988	Paddy Ashdown	Alan Beith	Russell Johnston	Robert Maclennan
Liberal; Democrats	July 1989	Paddy Ashdown	Alan Beith	David Steel	Robert Maclennan
Liberal; Democrats	July 1994	Paddy Ashdown	Malcolm Bruce	Menzies Campbell	Alan Beith
Liberal; Democrats	August 1999	Charles Kennedy	Matthew Taylor	Menzies Campbell	Simon Hughes
Liberal; Democrats	June 2003	Charles Kennedy	Vince Cable	Menzies Campbell	Mark Oaten
Liberal; Democrats	January 2006	Menzies Campbell (acting: Jan – Mar 2006)	Vince Cable	Menzies Campbell	Mark Oaten
Liberal; Democrats	January 2006	Menzies Campbell (acting: Jan – Mar 2006)	Vince Cable	Menzies Campbell	Alistair Carmichael
Liberal; Democrats	March 2006	Menzies Campbell (acting: Jan – Mar 2006)	Vince Cable	Michael Moore	Nick Clegg
Liberal; Democrats	October 2007	Vince Cable (acting)	Vince Cable	Michael Moore	Nick Clegg
Liberal; Democrats	December 2007	Nick Clegg (Deputy Prime Minister: May 2010 – May 2015)	Vince Cable	Ed Davey	Chris Huhne
Liberal; Democrats	May 2010	Nick Clegg (Deputy Prime Minister: May 2010 – May 2015)	David Laws (Chief Secretary to the Treasury)	Jeremy Browne (Minister of State for Foreign Affairs)	The Lord McNally (Minister of State for Justice)
Liberal; Democrats	May 2010	Nick Clegg (Deputy Prime Minister: May 2010 – May 2015)	Danny Alexander (Chief Secretary to the Treasury)	Jeremy Browne (Minister of State for Foreign Affairs)	The Lord McNally (Minister of State for Justice)
Liberal; Democrats	September 2012	Nick Clegg (Deputy Prime Minister: May 2010 – May 2015)	Danny Alexander (Chief Secretary to the Treasury)	Lynne Featherstone (Under Secretary of State for International Development)	Jeremy Browne (Minister of State for Home Affairs)
Liberal; Democrats	October 2013	Nick Clegg (Deputy Prime Minister: May 2010 – May 2015)	Danny Alexander (Chief Secretary to the Treasury)	Lynne Featherstone (Under Secretary of State for International Development)	Norman Baker (Minister of State for Home Affairs)
Liberal; Democrats	November 2014	Nick Clegg (Deputy Prime Minister: May 2010 – May 2015)	Danny Alexander (Chief Secretary to the Treasury)	Menzies Campbell (Member of the Foreign Affairs Select Committee)	Lynne Featherstone (Minister of State for Home Affairs)
Liberal; Democrats	January 2015	Nick Clegg (Deputy Prime Minister: May 2010 – May 2015)	Danny Alexander (Chief Secretary to the Treasury)	Tim Farron	Lynne Featherstone (Minister of State for Home Affairs)
Liberal; Democrats	July 2015	Tim Farron	The Baroness Kramer	Tom Brake	Alistair Carmichael
Liberal; Democrats	October 2016	Tim Farron	The Baroness Kramer	Tom Brake	The Lord Paddick
Liberal; Democrats	May 2017	Tim Farron	Vince Cable	Tom Brake	The Lord Paddick
Liberal; Democrats	June 2017	Tim Farron	Vince Cable	Jo Swinson	Ed Davey
Liberal; Democrats	July 2017	Vince Cable	Vince Cable	Jo Swinson	Ed Davey
Liberal; Democrats	Oct 2017	Vince Cable	The Baroness Kramer	Jo Swinson	Ed Davey
Liberal; Democrats	June 2019	Vince Cable	Chuka Umunna	Jo Swinson	Ed Davey
Liberal; Democrats	August 2019	Jo Swinson	Ed Davey	Chuka Umunna	Christine Jardine
Liberal; Democrats	December 2019	Ed Davey and Mark Pack (acting)	Ed Davey	Angela Smith (Int. Dev.)	Christine Jardine
Liberal; Democrats	January 2020	Ed Davey and Mark Pack (acting)	Ed Davey	Alistair Carmichael	Christine Jardine
Liberal; Democrats	August 2020	Ed Davey	Christine Jardine	Layla Moran	Alistair Carmichael
Liberal; Democrats	July 2022	Ed Davey	Sarah Olney	Layla Moran	Alistair Carmichael
Liberal; Democrats	September 2024	Ed Davey	Daisy Cooper	Calum Miller	Lisa Smart
Liberal; Democrats	September 2025	Ed Davey	Daisy Cooper	Calum Miller	Max Wilkinson

== See also ==
- Cabinet of the United Kingdom
- Official Opposition Shadow Cabinet (United Kingdom)
- List of British shadow cabinets
