= Liberal Democrat Treasury spokesperson =

Spokesperson for the United Kingdom Liberal Democrats

The Liberal Democrat Treasury spokesperson is the spokesperson for the United Kingdom Liberal Democrats on matters relating to the work of the Chancellor of the Exchequer and HM Treasury. The office holder is a member of the Liberal Democrat frontbench team. The post exists when the Liberal Democrats are in opposition, but not when they are in government, for example during the Cameron–Clegg coalition.

The position is also sometimes called the Liberal Democrat shadow chancellor.

== List of Treasury spokespersons ==
| Name | Portrait | Took office | Left office | Frontbench team |
|---|---|---|---|---|
| Alan Beith | | March 1988 | June 1994 | Steel Maclennan |
| Alan Beith | | March 1988 | June 1994 | Ashdown |
| Malcolm Bruce | | July 1994 | July 1999 | Ashdown |
| Matthew Taylor | | 9 August 1999 | 12 June 2003 | Kennedy |
| Vince Cable | | 12 July 2003 | 11 May 2010 | Kennedy |
| Vince Cable | | 12 July 2003 | 11 May 2010 | Campbell |
| Vince Cable | | 12 July 2003 | 11 May 2010 | Cable I |
| Vince Cable | | 12 July 2003 | 11 May 2010 | Clegg |
| Vacant – Liberal Democrats part of the Cameron–Clegg coalition (Note: David Laws served as Chief Secretary to the Treasury in May 2010, followed by Danny Alexander until 2015) | | 11 May 2010 | 7 January 2015 | – |
| Danny Alexander | | 7 January 2015 | 8 May 2015 | Clegg's General Election Cabinet |
| Baroness Kramer | | 16 July 2015 | 8 May 2017 | Farron |
| Vince Cable | | 16 June 2017 | 12 October 2017 | Farron |
| Vince Cable | | 16 June 2017 | 12 October 2017 | Cable II |
| Baroness Kramer | | 12 October 2017 | 14 June 2019 | Cable II |
| Chuka Umunna | | 14 June 2019 | 21 August 2019 | Cable II |
| Sir Edward Davey | | 21 August 2019 | 7 September 2020 | Swinson |
| Sir Edward Davey | | 21 August 2019 | 7 September 2020 | Davey (acting) |
| Christine Jardine | | 7 September 2020 | 10 July 2022 | Davey |
| Sarah Olney | | 11 July 2022 | 18 September 2024 | Davey |
| Daisy Cooper | | 18 September 2024 | Incumbent | Davey |

=== Chief Secretary to the Treasury/Deputy Treasury spokespeople ===
| Name | Portrait | Took office | Left office | Frontbench team |
|---|---|---|---|---|
| Ed Davey | | 1997 | 2002 | Ashdown |
| Ed Davey | | 1997 | 2002 | Kennedy |
| David Laws | | 2002 | 2005 | Kennedy |
| Chris Huhne | | 16 May 2005 | 3 March 2006 | Kennedy |
| Julia Goldsworthy | | 10 March 2006 | 20 December 2007 | Campbell |
| Julia Goldsworthy | | 10 March 2006 | 20 December 2007 | Cable I |
| Jeremy Browne | | 20 December 2007 | 11 May 2010 | Clegg |
| Charlie Maynard | | 1 October 2025 | 9 October 2026 | Davey |
