= Frontbench team of Jo Swinson =

Frontbench Team of Jo Swinson
- 2019
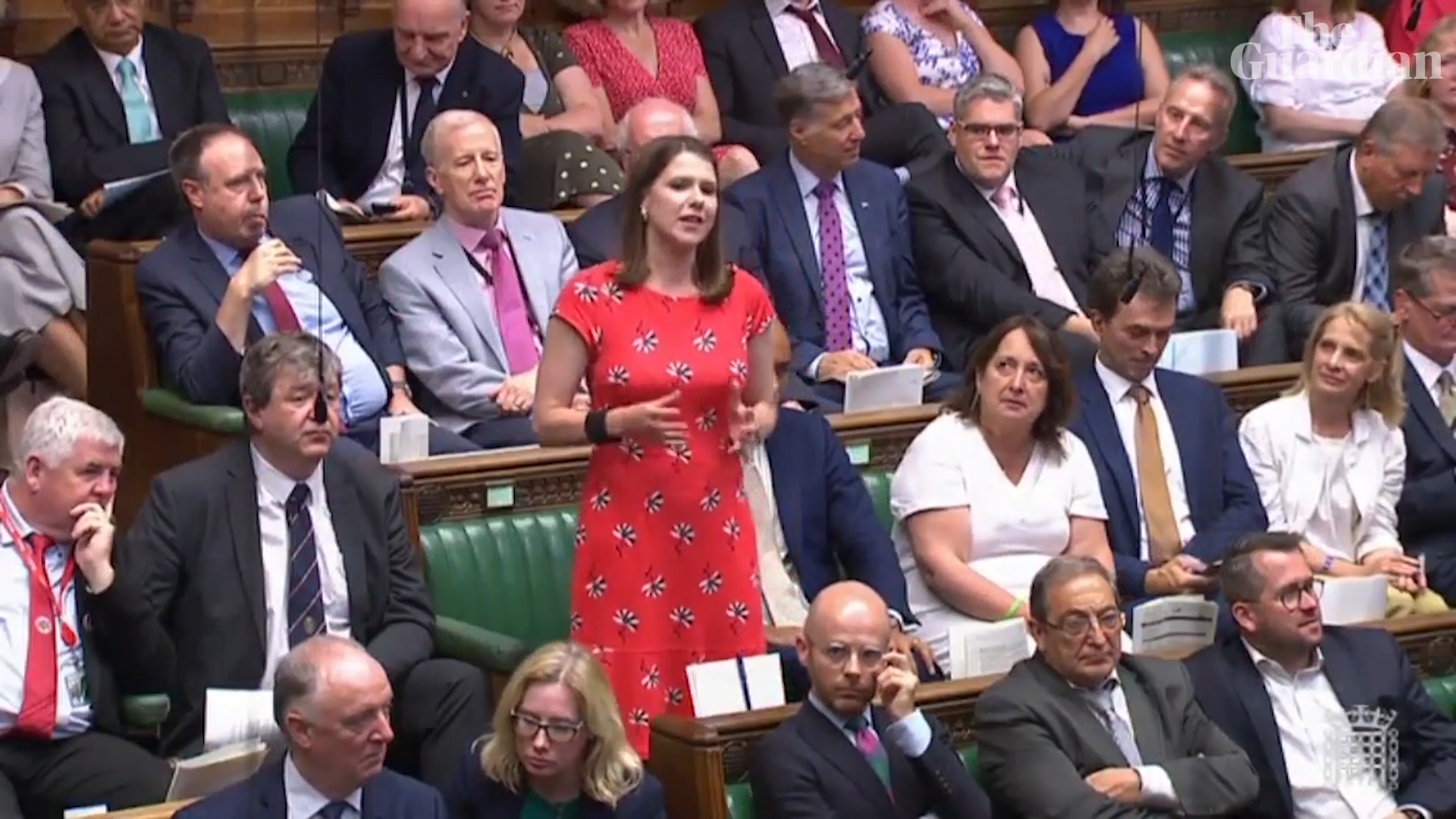
- Date formed: 22 July 2019
- Date dissolved: 13 December 2019

People and organisations
- Monarch: Elizabeth II
- Leader: Jo Swinson
- Deputy Leader: Ed Davey
- Member party: Liberal Democrats
- Status in legislature: Opposition 21 / 650 (3%)

History
- Incoming formation: 2019 leadership election
- Outgoing formation: 2019 General Election
- Legislature term: 2017 UK Parliament
- Predecessor: Second Frontbench Team of Vince Cable
- Successor: Frontbench Team of Ed Davey

Jo Swinson was elected to lead the Liberal Democrats on 22 July 2019. However, she resigned the leadership following the loss of her seat in the 2019 General Election. Swinson was the first woman to lead the party, and also the youngest person to do so. The list that follows is the frontbench team led by Swinson in 2019.

Swinson announced her first frontbench team in August 2019. Of 14 MPs, Norman Lamb and Sarah Wollaston were not included in the shadow cabinet given their roles as Chair of respective Select Committees.

== Liberal Democrat Frontbench Team (2019) ==
Frontbench Team of Jo Swinson
| Portfolio | Holder | Term |
|---|---|---|
| Leader | Jo Swinson; CBE MP | 2019 |
| Deputy Leader | The Rt Hon; Sir Ed Davey; FRSA MP | 2019–2020 |
| Treasury | The Rt Hon; Sir Ed Davey; FRSA MP | 2019–2020 |
| Business, Energy and Industrial Strategy | The Rt Hon; Sir Ed Davey; FRSA MP | 2019 |
| Business, Energy and Industrial Strategy | Sam Gyimah; MP | 2019 |
| Foreign and Commonwealth Affairs | Chuka Umunna; MP | 2019 |
| International Trade | Chuka Umunna; MP | 2019 |
| International Development | Chuka Umunna; MP | 2019 |
| International Development | Angela Smith; MP | 2019 |
| Home Affairs | Christine Jardine; MP | 2019–2020 |
| Women and Equalities | Christine Jardine; MP | 2019–2020 |
| Deputy Chief Whip | Christine Jardine; MP | 2019–2020 |
| Justice | Christine Jardine; MP | 2019 |
| Justice | Phillip Lee; MP | 2019 |
| Exiting the European Union | The Rt Hon; Tom Brake; MP | 2017–2019 |
| Office of Chancellor of the Duchy of Lancaster | The Rt Hon; Tom Brake; MP | 2019 |
| Defence | Jamie Stone; MP | 2019–2024 |
| Scotland | Jamie Stone; MP | 2019–2020 |
| Cabinet Office | The Rt Hon; Sir Vince Cable; MP | 2019 |
| Health and Social Care | The Rt Hon; Sir Vince Cable; MP | 2019 |
| Health and Social Care | Luciana Berger; MP | 2019 |
| Education | Layla Moran; MP | 2017–2020 |
| Digital, Culture, Media and Sport | Layla Moran; MP | 2019–2020 |
| Climate Emergency | Wera Hobhouse; MP | 2019–2020 |
| Environment and Food | Wera Hobhouse; MP | 2019–2020 |
| Transport | Wera Hobhouse; MP | 2019–2020 |
| Housing, Communities and Local Government | Tim Farron; MP | 2019–2024 |
| Work and Pensions | Tim Farron; MP | 2019–2020 |
| North of England (Northern Powerhouse) | Tim Farron; MP | 2017–2019 |
| Chief Whip | The Rt Hon; Alistair Carmichael; MP | 2017–2020 |
| Northern Ireland | The Rt Hon; Alistair Carmichael; MP | 2017–2020 |
| Deputy Leader of the Scottish Liberal Democrats | The Rt Hon; Alistair Carmichael; MP | 2012–2021 |
| Wales | Jane Dodds; MP | 2019 |
| Food and Rural Affairs | Jane Dodds; MP | 2019 |
| Leader of the Welsh Liberal Democrats | Jane Dodds; MP | 2017–present |
| Europe | Catherine Bearder; MEP | 2019–2020 |
| London | Siobhan Benita | 2019–2020 |
| Leader of the Scottish Liberal Democrats | Willie Rennie; MSP | 2019–2021 |
| Leader on the Welsh Assembly | Kirsty Williams; CBE AM | 2019–2021 |
| Leader on the London Assembly | Caroline Pidgeon; MBE MLA | 2019–2024 |
| Leader in the House of Lords | The Rt Hon; The Lord Newby; OBE PC | 2016–2025 |
| President of the Liberal Democrats | The Rt Hon; The Baroness Brinton | 2015–2019 |

== See also ==
- Cabinet of the United Kingdom
- Official Opposition Shadow Cabinet (UK)
