= Christine Jardine =

Scottish Liberal Democrat Politician

Christine Jardine MP
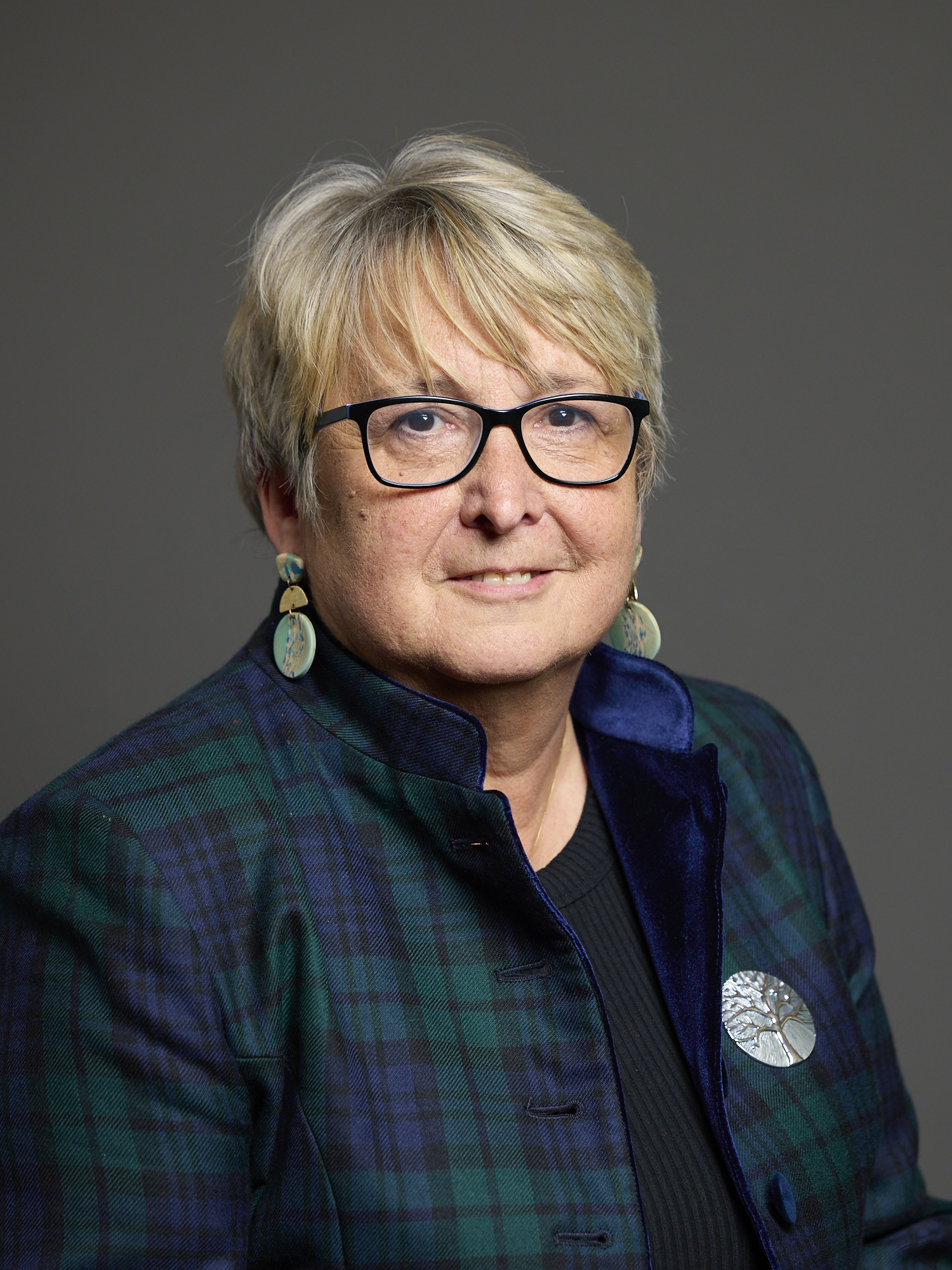
- Official portrait, 2024

Member of Parliament for Edinburgh West
- Incumbent
- Assumed office 8 June 2017
- Preceded by: Michelle Thomson
- Majority: 16,470 (31.4%)

Liberal Democrat portfolios
- 2017: Digital, Culture, Media and Sport
- 2017–2019, 2022–2025: Scotland
- 2019: Work and Pensions
- 2019: Justice
- 2019–2020: Home Affairs
- 2019–2020, 2022–2025: Women and Equalities
- 2020–2022: International Trade
- 2020-2022: Europe and Exiting the European Union
- 2020–2022: Treasury
- 2022–2024: Cabinet Office

Personal details
- Born: Christine Anne Jardine; 24 November 1960 (age 65) Glasgow, Scotland
- Party: Liberal Democrats
- Education: University of Glasgow
- Website: www.libdems.org.uk/christine-jardine

Christine Anne Jardine (born 24 November 1960) is a Scottish Liberal Democrat politician who has been the Member of Parliament (MP) for Edinburgh West since 2017. She was the Liberal Democrat Spokesperson for Women and Equalities and Scotland from July 2022 until July 2025.

She previously served as Liberal Democrat Spokesperson for the Cabinet Office. She was Liberal Democrat Spokesperson for Treasury, Europe, Exiting the European Union and International Trade from 2020 to 2022. She was the Liberal Democrat Home Affairs Spokesperson from 2019 to 2020.

== Early life and career ==
Christine Jardine was born on 24 November 1960 in Glasgow. She was educated at Clydebank High School and the University of Glasgow, where she graduated with a MA (Hons).

She is a former journalist, who worked for BBC Scotland and was editor of the Press Association in Scotland. She also taught journalism at the University of Strathclyde, Robert Gordon University and the University of the West of Scotland.

== Political career ==
In 2011 Jardine was appointed as the Scottish media adviser to the Coalition Government, working under Nick Clegg. That same year, she was the Lib Dem candidate for Inverness and Nairn at the 2011 Scottish Parliament election, where she finished fourth.

In May 2013, she was selected as the candidate for the upcoming by-election in Aberdeen Donside, this time coming third.

== Parliamentary career ==
At the 2015 general election, Jardine stood for election to the House of Commons in Gordon, where she came second with 32.7% of the vote behind the SNP candidate Alex Salmond.

At the snap 2017 general election, Jardine was elected to Parliament as MP for Edinburgh West with 34.3% of the vote and a majority of 2,988.

She served as the Liberal Democrat Spokesperson on Home Affairs and Women and Equalities from August 2019 to August 2020, and was also the Justice Spokesperson from August 2019 to October 2019. She sits on the Scottish Affairs Committee at Westminster.

Jardine was re-elected as MP for Edinburgh West at the 2019 general election with an increased vote share of 39.9% and an increased majority of 3,769.

She was promoted to Trade, Treasury and Brexit spokeswoman in September 2020.

On 11 July 2022, Jardine was appointed Liberal Democrat Spokesperson for Women and Equalities, Liberal Democrat Spokesperson for the Cabinet Office and Liberal Democrat Spokesperson for Scotland.

Jardine is a vice-chair of the All-Party Parliamentary Group for Choice at the End of Life.

At the 2024 general election, Jardine was again re-elected with an increased vote share of 50.8% and an increased majority of 16,470.

It was revealed that Jardine received a £4,000 donation from Nick Clegg in the 2024 General Election.

Jardine is a co-sponsor of Kim Leadbeater's Terminally Ill Adults (End of Life) Bill on assisted suicide. She welcomed the Animal Welfare Bill.

In July 2025, she was sacked from the frontbench by Ed Davey. This was after she rebelled in a vote on changes to welfare benefits.

On 26 September 2026, Jardine announced that she will not seek re-election at the next general election as a Liberal Democrat.

== Personal life ==
Jardine was married for 30 years to Calum Macdonald, the Digital Editor for the Herald and Times Group. He died of a heart attack aged 55 during the 2017 general election campaign. She has one daughter.

Parliament of the United Kingdom
Preceded by Michelle Thomson	Member of the Parliament for Edinburgh West; 2017–present	Incumbent
