= Second Frontbench team of Vince Cable =

Political group within UK Parliament

Second Frontbench Team of Vince Cable
- 2017–2019
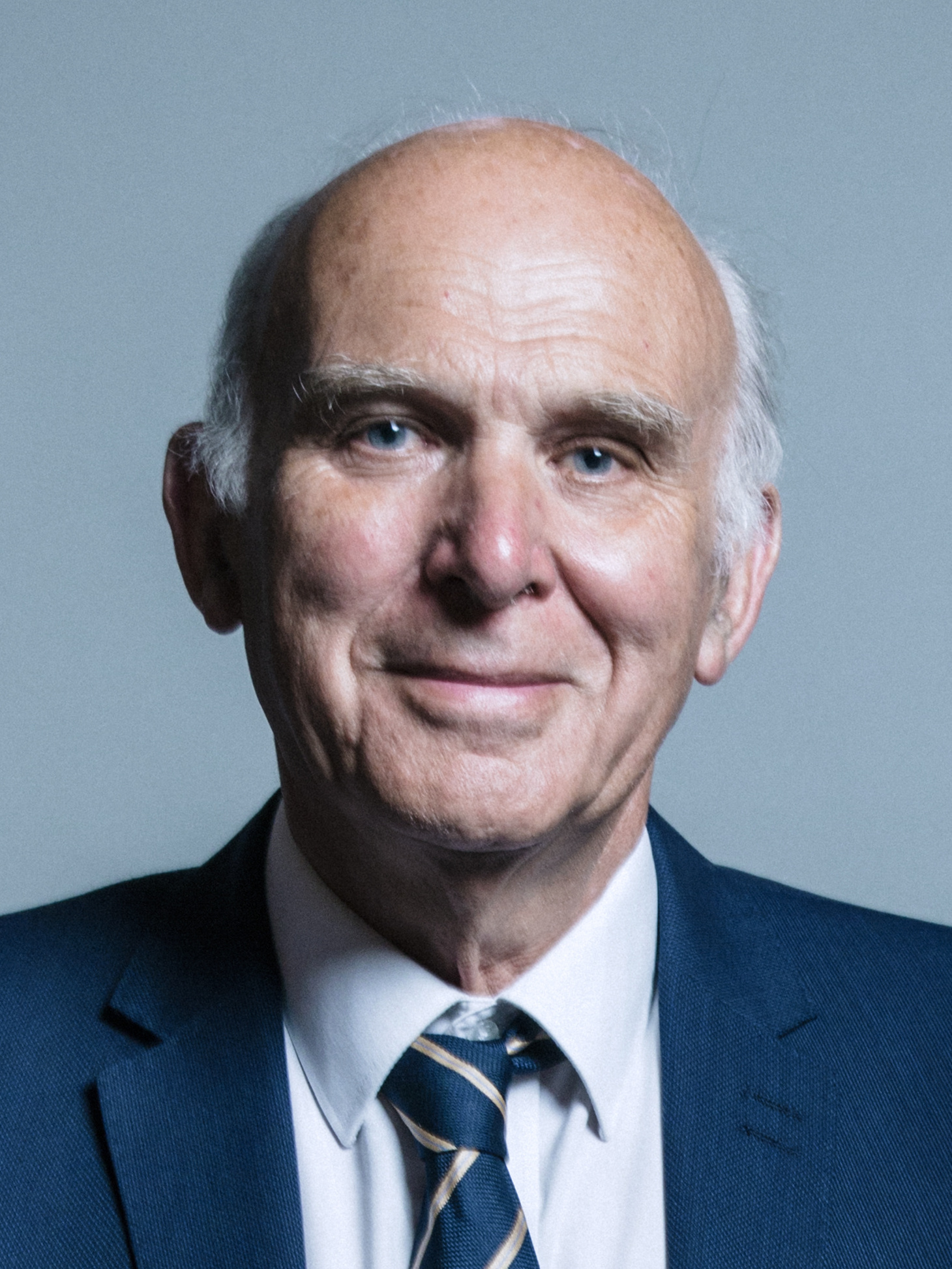
- Date formed: 20 July 2017
- Date dissolved: 22 July 2019

People and organisations
- Monarch: Elizabeth II
- Leader: Vince Cable
- Deputy Leader: Jo Swinson
- Member party: Liberal Democrats
- Status in legislature: Opposition 12 / 650 (2%)

History
- Incoming formation: 2017 leadership election
- Outgoing formation: 2019 leadership election
- Legislature term: 2017 UK Parliament
- Predecessor: Frontbench Team of Tim Farron
- Successor: Frontbench Team of Jo Swinson

On 20 July 2017, Sir Vince Cable became Leader of the Liberal Democrats after facing no competition. He was the oldest leader of a major UK political party since Sir Winston Churchill. Upon taking office Cable made no significant reshuffle to his Frontbench Team, so the line-up remained much as it was inherited from Tim Farron. Cable later completed his first reshuffle a few weeks after the Party's 2017 Autumn Conference.

Cable previously served as Acting Leader of the Liberal Democrats following the resignation of Menzies Campbell in 2007.

== Liberal Democrat Frontbench Team (2017- 2019) ==
Second Frontbench Team of Vince Cable

Portfolio	Holder	Term
Leader of the Liberal Democrats	The Rt Hon; Sir Vince Cable; MP	2017-2019
Deputy Leader of the Liberal Democrats	Jo Swinson; MP	2017-2019
Spokesperson for Foreign and Commonwealth Affairs	Jo Swinson; MP	2017–2019
Chief Whip of the Liberal Democrats	The Rt Hon; Alistair Carmichael; MP	2017–2020
Spokesperson for Northern Ireland	The Rt Hon; Alistair Carmichael; MP	2017–2020
Spokesperson for the Treasury	The Rt Hon; The Baroness Kramer; PC	2017–2019
Spokesperson for Home Affairs	The Rt Hon; Sir Ed Davey; FRSA MP	2017–2019
Spokesperson for Defence	The Rt Hon; The Lord Campbell of Pittenweem; CH CBE PC QC	2017–2019
Spokesperson for Exiting the European Union	The Rt Hon; Tom Brake; MP	2017–2019
Spokesperson for International Trade	The Rt Hon; Tom Brake; MP	2017–2019
Shadow Leader of the House of Lords	The Rt Hon; The Lord Newby; OBE PC	2016–2025
Spokesperson for Health	The Rt Hon; The Baroness Jolly	2017–2019
Spokesperson for Education	Layla Moran; MP	2017–2020
Spokesperson for Young People	The Rt Hon; The Lord Storey; CBE	2017–2019
Spokesperson for Work and Pensions	Stephen Lloyd; MP	2017–2018
Spokesperson for Work and Pensions	Christine Jardine; MP	2019
Spokesperson for Business and Industrial Strategy	The Rt Hon; The Lord Fox	2017–2019
Spokesperson for Energy and Climate Change	The Rt Hon; The Baroness Featherstone; PC	2015–2019
Spokesperson for Energy and Climate Change	Wera Hobhouse; MP	2019–2020
Spokesperson for Communities and Local Government	Wera Hobhouse; MP	2017–2019
Spokesperson for Communities and Local Government	Tim Farron; MP	2019–2022
Spokesperson for Transport	The Rt Hon; The Baroness Randerson	2015–2019
Spokesperson for Environment, Food and Rural Affairs	The Rt Hon; Alistair Carmichael; MP	2019
Spokesperson for Environment, Food and Rural Affairs	Tim Farron; MP	2017–2019
Spokesperson for the North of England	Tim Farron; MP	2017–2020
Spokesperson for International Development	The Rt Hon; The Baroness Sheehan	2016–2019
Spokesperson for Culture, Media and Sport	The Rt Hon; The Baroness Bonham-Carter of Yarnbury	2017–2019
Spokesperson for Justice	The Rt Hon; The Lord Marks of Henley-on-Thames; QC	2015–2019
Spokesperson for Justice	Wera Hobhouse; MP	2019
Spokesperson for Wales	The Rt Hon; The Baroness Humphreys	2017–2019
Spokesperson for Scotland	Christine Jardine; MP	2017–2019
Spokesperson for Scotland	Jamie Stone; MP	2019–2020
Spokesperson for the Armed Forces	Jamie Stone; MP	2017–2022
Chief Whip of the House of Lords	The Rt Hon; The Lord Stoneham of Droxford	2016–present
Spokesperson for Housing	The Rt Hon; The Lord Shipley	2017–2019
Spokesperson for Women	The Rt Hon; The Baroness Burt of Solihull	2017–2019
Spokesperson without portfolio	The Rt Hon; The Baroness Doocey	2017–2019

=== Changes ===
- 10 June 2018: Christine Jardine is appointed as temporary cover for the Foreign Affairs spokesperson post while Jo Swinson is on maternity leave.

== See also ==
- Cabinet of the United Kingdom
- Official Opposition Shadow Cabinet (UK)
- Frontbench Team of Ian Blackford
- Liberal Democrat frontbench team
- Lib Dems
