= Don Foster, Baron Foster of Bath =

British Liberal Democrat Politician

The Right Honourable The Lord Foster of Bath PC
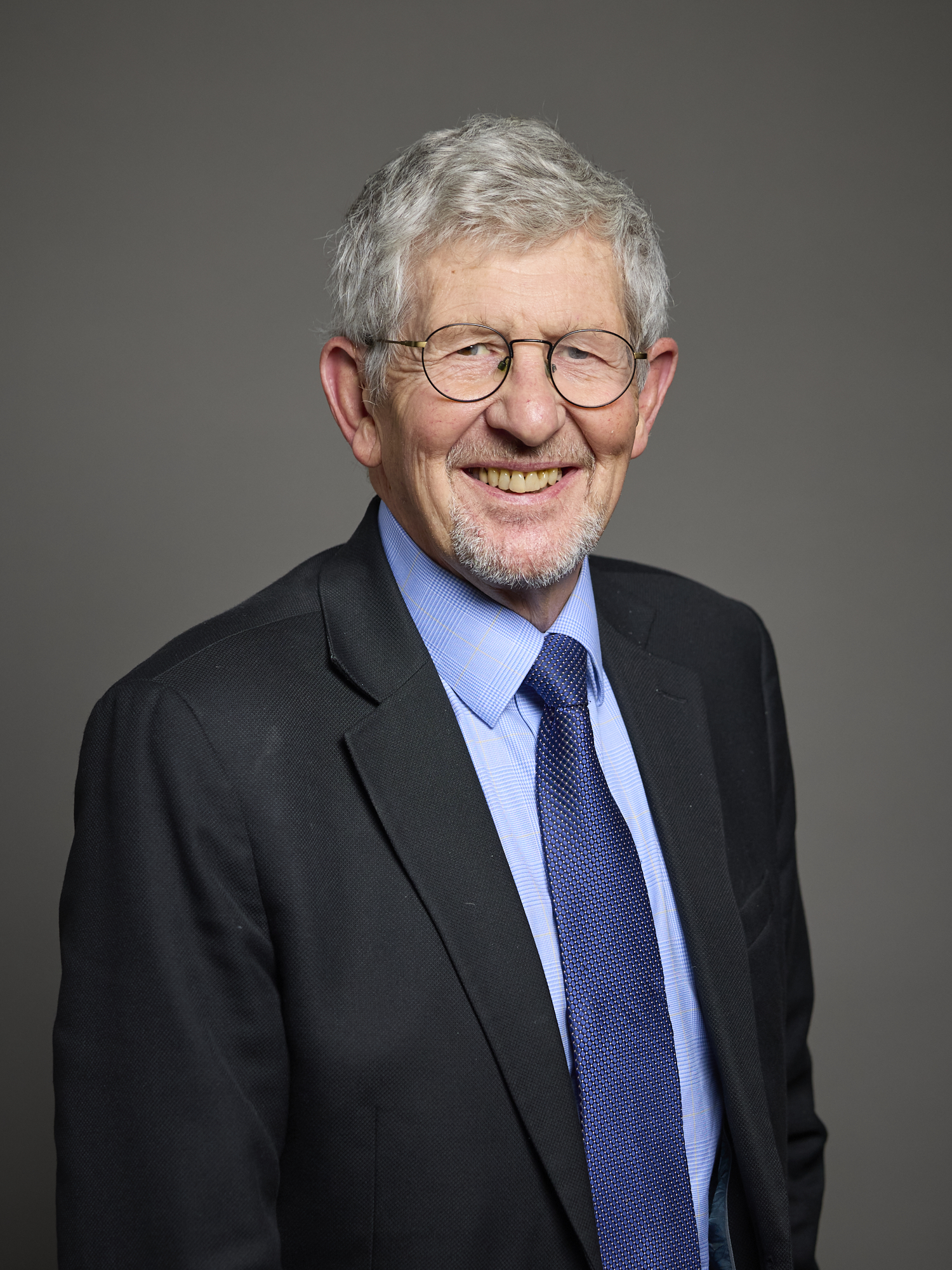
- Official portrait, 2025

Government Deputy Chief Whip in the House of Commons
- In office 7 October 2013 – 11 May 2015
- Prime Minister: David Cameron
- Preceded by: Alistair Carmichael
- Succeeded by: Anne Milton

Comptroller of the Household
- In office 7 October 2013 – 11 May 2015
- Prime Minister: David Cameron
- Preceded by: Alistair Carmichael
- Succeeded by: Gavin Barwell

Parliamentary Under-Secretary of State for Communities and Local Government
- In office 4 September 2012 – 7 October 2013
- Prime Minister: David Cameron
- Preceded by: Andrew Stunell
- Succeeded by: Stephen Williams
Liberal Democrat portfolios
1992–1995	Education
1995–1997	Social Security
1999–2001	Environment, Transport and the Regions
2002–2003	Transport
2003–2010	Culture, Media and Sport
2016–2017	Business, Energy and Industrial Strategy

Member of the House of Lords
- Lord Temporal
- Life peerage 7 October 2015

Member of Parliament for Bath
- In office 9 April 1992 – 30 March 2015
- Preceded by: Chris Patten
- Succeeded by: Ben Howlett

Personal details
- Born: Donald Michael Ellison Foster; 31 March 1947 (age 79) Preston, Lancashire, England
- Party: Liberal Democrats
- Education: University of Keele; University of Bath

Donald Michael Ellison Foster, Baron Foster of Bath PC (born 31 March 1947), is a British politician and life peer who served as Government Deputy Chief Whip and Comptroller of the Household from 2013 to 2015. A member of the Liberal Democrats, he was Member of Parliament (MP) for Bath from 1992 to 2015.

== Early life ==
Foster was born in Preston, Lancashire, and attended the Lancaster Royal Grammar School before Keele University where he was awarded a BSc degree in physics and psychology in 1969, and also received the CertEd that same year. He later received an MEd in education at the University of Bath in 1981.

He was a science teacher at Sevenoaks School in Kent in 1969, before appointment as Avon Education Authority's Science Project Director in 1975 and as a Lecturer in Education at Bristol University in 1980, before being engaged as a management consultant with Pannell Kerr Forster from 1989 until his election to the House of Commons.

== Parliamentary career ==
A local party activist, he was a founder member of the Avon Liberal Democrats and was elected as a Councillor on Avon County Council in 1981 for Cabot Ward, and was the SDP–Liberal Alliance Group Leader from 1981 to 1986. He also served as the county's education committee chairman, and remained a Councillor until 1989. He unsuccessfully contested Bristol East at the 1987 general election where he finished in third place, 11,659 votes behind the Conservative Jonathan Sayeed.

He was first elected in the constituency of Bath at the 1992 general election when he defeated then-Conservative Party Chairman, Chris Patten with a majority of 3,768. In his maiden speech on 12 May 1992, Foster spoke of the World Heritage Site status of Bath and sent his best wishes to Patten in Hong Kong.

In Parliament, Foster was the Liberal Democrat Spokesman for Education under the leadership of Paddy Ashdown in 1992, in which capacity he served until 1999.

In December 2010, in response to a call from the Football Supporters' Federation, he introduced a Bill in Parliament for English and Welsh football safe standing areas, the first of its kind since the Taylor Report.

Having been sworn of the Privy Council in 2010, in September 2012 Foster was appointed Parliamentary Under-Secretary of State for Communities and Local Government before being promoted in October 2013 as Government Deputy Chief Whip representing the Liberal Democrats in the Coalition.

In January 2014, Foster announced he would stand down as an MP at the following general election. He was created Baron Foster of Bath, of Bath in the County of Somerset, in the 2015 Dissolution Honours, becoming a member of the House of Lords. His Bath constituency was won by the Conservatives at the 2015 general election and regained by the Liberal Democrats in 2017.

== Personal life ==
His interests include Third World issues, being a member of Amnesty International and the Child Poverty Action Group as well as supporting a number of local charities, including Ted's Big Day Out and Julian House. Lord Foster's main national charity is WaterAid and he has seen first hand their work in Ethiopia. He is a vice-president of the Debating Group, and also enjoys sport, music, ballet, travelling and reading; Lord Foster also plays the ukulele.

Foster was nominated for a life peerage in August 2015, despite having previously favoured abolition of the House of Lords. When accused of hypocrisy, Foster stated: "I want to get rid of [the House of Lords] and the only way [to do that]...is having people there who will do just that."

The University of Bath awarded Foster an Honorary Doctorate of Laws in June 2016.

== Publications ==
- Resource Based Learning in Science by Don Foster, 1979, Association for Science Education ISBN 0-902786-52-0
- Science with Gas by Don Foster, 1981
- Aspects of Science by Don Foster, 1984, Longman ISBN 0-201-14377-1
- Reading about Science by Don Foster, 1984
- Nuffield Science by Don Foster, 1986
- Teaching Science 11–13 Edited by Don Foster, Cecil Powell and Roger Lock, 1987, Routledge ISBN 0-7099-4931-6
- Education: Investing in Education by Don Foster, 1994, Liberal Democrat Publications ISBN 1-85187-243-4
- Making the Right Start: Nursery Education and Care by Don Foster, 1994, Liberal Democrat Publications ISBN 1-85187-264-7
- From the Three Rs to the Three Cs: A Personal View of Education by Don Foster, 2003 ISBN 0-9546078-0-5

== See also ==
- Liberal Democrat frontbench team

== Notes ==
Parliament of the United Kingdom
Preceded by Chris Patten	Member of Parliament for Bath; 1992–2015	Succeeded by Ben Howlett
Political offices
Preceded by Alistair Carmichael	Government Deputy Chief Whip in the Commons; 2013–2015	Succeeded by Anne Milton
Preceded by Alistair Carmichael	Comptroller of the Household; 2013–2015	Succeeded by Gavin Barwell
Party political offices
Preceded by Alistair Carmichael	Liberal Democrat Chief Whip in the Commons; 2013–2015	Succeeded by Tom Brake
Orders of precedence in the United Kingdom
Preceded by The Lord Lupton	Gentlemen; Baron Foster of Bath	Followed by The Lord Hague of Richmond
