= Malcolm Bruce =

British politician (born 1944)

The Right Honourable The Lord Bruce of Bennachie PC
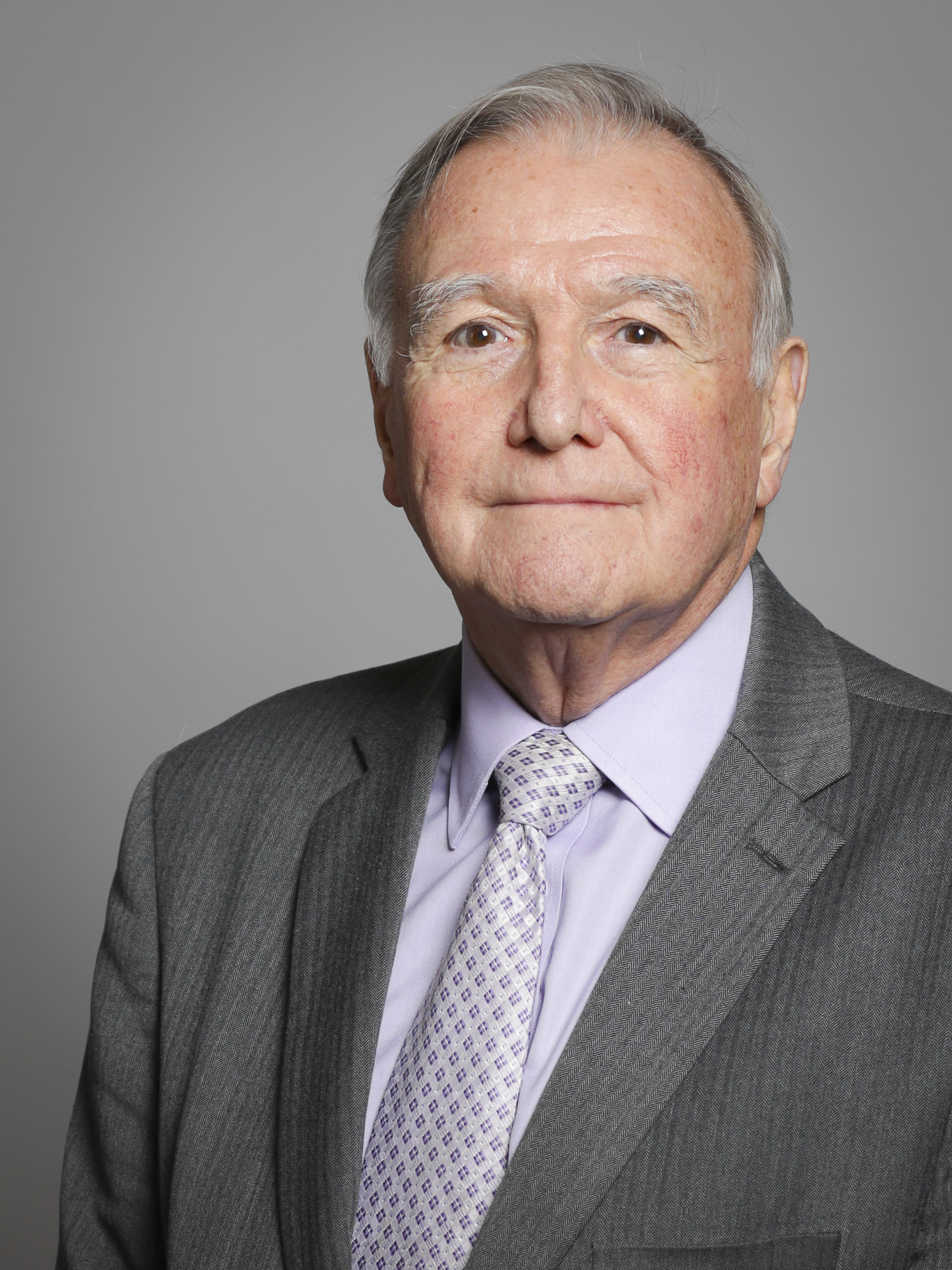
- Official portrait, 2019

Deputy Leader of the Liberal Democrats
- In office 28 January 2014 – 8 May 2015
- Leader: Nick Clegg
- Preceded by: Simon Hughes
- Succeeded by: Jo Swinson (2017)

Chair of the International Development Committee
- In office 14 July 2005 – 30 March 2015
- Preceded by: Tony Baldry
- Succeeded by: Stephen Twigg

Chair of the Liberal Democrats Parliamentary Party
- In office 9 August 1999 – 7 June 2001
- Leader: Charles Kennedy
- Preceded by: Alan Beith
- Succeeded by: Mark Oaten

Leader of the Scottish Liberal Democrats
- In office 3 March 1988 – 18 April 1992
- Leader: David Steel/Bob Maclennan (joint acting leaders); Paddy Ashdown
- President: Russell Johnston
- Preceded by: Russell Johnston (as Leader of the Scottish Liberal Party)
- Succeeded by: Jim Wallace

Member of the House of Lords
- Lord Temporal
- Life peerage 19 October 2015

Member of Parliament for Gordon
- In office 9 June 1983 – 30 March 2015
- Preceded by: Constituency established
- Succeeded by: Alex Salmond

Personal details
- Born: 17 November 1944 (age 81) Birkenhead, England
- Party: Liberal Democrats
- Other political affiliations: Scottish Liberal Party
- Spouses: Veronica Wilson (m. 1969; div. 1992) Rosemary Vetterlein (m. 1998)
- Children: 5
- Education: University of St Andrews; University of Strathclyde

Malcolm Gray Bruce, Baron Bruce of Bennachie, PC (born 17 November 1944) is a British Liberal Democrat politician. He was the Member of Parliament for Gordon from 1983 to 2015 and was the chairman of the International Development Select Committee from 2005 to 2015. He was deputy leader of the Liberal Democrats from January 2014 to May 2015. He was nominated for a life peerage in the 2015 Dissolution Honours. He was also previously President of the Scottish Liberal Democrats until being succeeded by Councillor Eileen McCartin from 1 January 2016.

== Early life ==
Bruce was born in Birkenhead, and educated at Wrekin College in Shropshire, England, prior to attending Queen's College (now the University of Dundee) at the University of St Andrews, where he received a degree in economics and political science, and Strathclyde University where he received a second degree in marketing. He was a trainee journalist with the Liverpool Post for a year from 1966 prior to him becoming a section buyer with the Boots Group in 1967. After a brief spell with A. Goldberg & Son, he was appointed in 1971 as a research and information officer with the North East Scotland Development Agency. He contested the Parliamentary seat of North Angus and Mearns for the Liberal Party at the October 1974 general election, but the sitting Conservative and Unionist MP Alick Buchanan-Smith won with a majority of 2,551.

== Career ==
Bruce was elected as the vice-chairman of the Scottish Liberal Party in 1975, in the same year he became a director with the Noroil Publishing House. He again stood for Parliament at the 1979 general election for the seat of West Aberdeenshire and was again defeated by the sitting Conservative and Unionist MP, this time Russell Fairgrieve by 2,766 votes. Bruce became the editor of the Aberdeen Petroleum Press in 1981 until his election as MP for Gordon in 1983.

He was called to the bar at Gray's Inn in 1995.

== Member of Parliament ==
Bruce stood for parliament for a third time at the newly created seat of Gordon, based largely on the former Aberdeenshire West. Fairgrieve retired, and at the 1983 general election Bruce was very narrowly elected and became the Liberal MP for Gordon with a majority of just 850, going on to hold the seat for thirty-two years. He was an outspoken opponent of coalition with the Labour Party.

When he was elected to parliament, Bruce served on the Scottish Affairs Select committee, and in 1986 was given a job by David Steel as a Spokesman on Energy and Scotland. He also became Rector of the University of Dundee in 1986 for three years. After the 1987 general election, at which Bruce's majority had increased to 9,519, he was briefly a spokesman on Education, before speaking on Trade and Industry later in 1987. After the amalgamation of the Liberal Party and the Social Democratic Party and the formation of the Liberal Democrats he became the new party's Energy spokesman and at the same time became the Leader of the Scottish Liberal Democrats under the new leadership of Paddy Ashdown. In 1989 he was appointed as the Environment spokesman, before having the Scotland portfolio after 1990.

After the 1992 general election, at which he narrowly held Gordon by just 274 votes, he again became the Trade and Industry spokesman. By 1994 he had become the Treasury spokesman. Whilst a Treasury spokesman it was Bruce who developed the idea of a 'penny on income tax'. At the 1997 general election Bruce's majority had risen again to 6,997. The Liberal Democrats had 46 MPs, more than they have had since before the 1920s. Paddy Ashdown created a new Shadow Cabinet system and Bruce became the Liberal Democrat Shadow Chancellor of the Exchequer. When Ashdown stood down in 1999 he contested the leadership of the party but came in third place. In 1999, under the new leadership of Charles Kennedy, became the Chairman of the Liberal Democrats until 2001, and 2000 - 2015 was the president of the Scottish Liberal Democrats.

Bruce won Gordon for the fifth consecutive time at the 2001 general election with a still rising majority of 7,879. Following his re-election, Bruce became the Liberal Democrat Shadow Secretary of State for the Environment, Food and Rural Affairs, and the Shadow Secretary of State for Trade and Industry in 2003. He stood down from the frontbench following the 2005 general election, where he was re-elected with his highest majority yet at 11,026. He was Chairman of the International Development Select Committee from 2005 to 2015, scrutinising the work of the Department of International Development.

He was made a Member of the Privy Council on 19 July 2006.

He was knighted in the 2012 Birthday Honours for public and political service.

On 2 September 2013 he announced that he would not seek re-election as an MP at the 2015 General Election. He was announced as a life peer in the 2015 Dissolution Honours and was created Baron Bruce of Bennachie, of Torphins in the County of Aberdeen on 19 October.

== Personal life ==
He married Veronica Jane Wilson in 1969 and they have a son and a daughter, before divorcing in 1992. Bruce married secondly, in 1998, Rosemary Vetterlein, a Lib Dem activist and prospective parliamentary candidate who contested Beckenham unsuccessfully in 1997.

Lord and Lady Bruce have two daughters and a son together. Bruce takes a keen interest in deaf issues; one of his children is deaf.

Parliament of the United Kingdom
| New constituency | Member of Parliament for Gordon; 1983–2015 | Succeeded by Alex Salmond |
Academic offices
| Preceded by Gordon Wilson | Rector of the University of Dundee; 1986–1989 | Succeeded by Paul Scott |
Party political offices
| Preceded by Russell Johnston | Leader of the Scottish Liberal Democrats; 1988–1992 | Succeeded by Jim Wallace |
| Preceded by Alan Beith | Chair of the Liberal Democrats; 1999–2001 | Succeeded by Mark Oaten |
| Preceded by Roy Thomson | President of the Scottish Liberal Democrats; 2000–2016 | Succeeded by Eileen McCartin |
| Preceded by Simon Hughes | Deputy Leader of the Liberal Democrats; 2014–2015 | Vacant Title next held by Jo Swinson |
Orders of precedence in the United Kingdom
| Preceded by The Lord Willetts | Gentlemen; Baron Bruce of Bennachie | Followed by The Lord Beith |
