= Leader of the Liberal Democrats =

Most senior politician within the Liberal Democrats in the United Kingdom

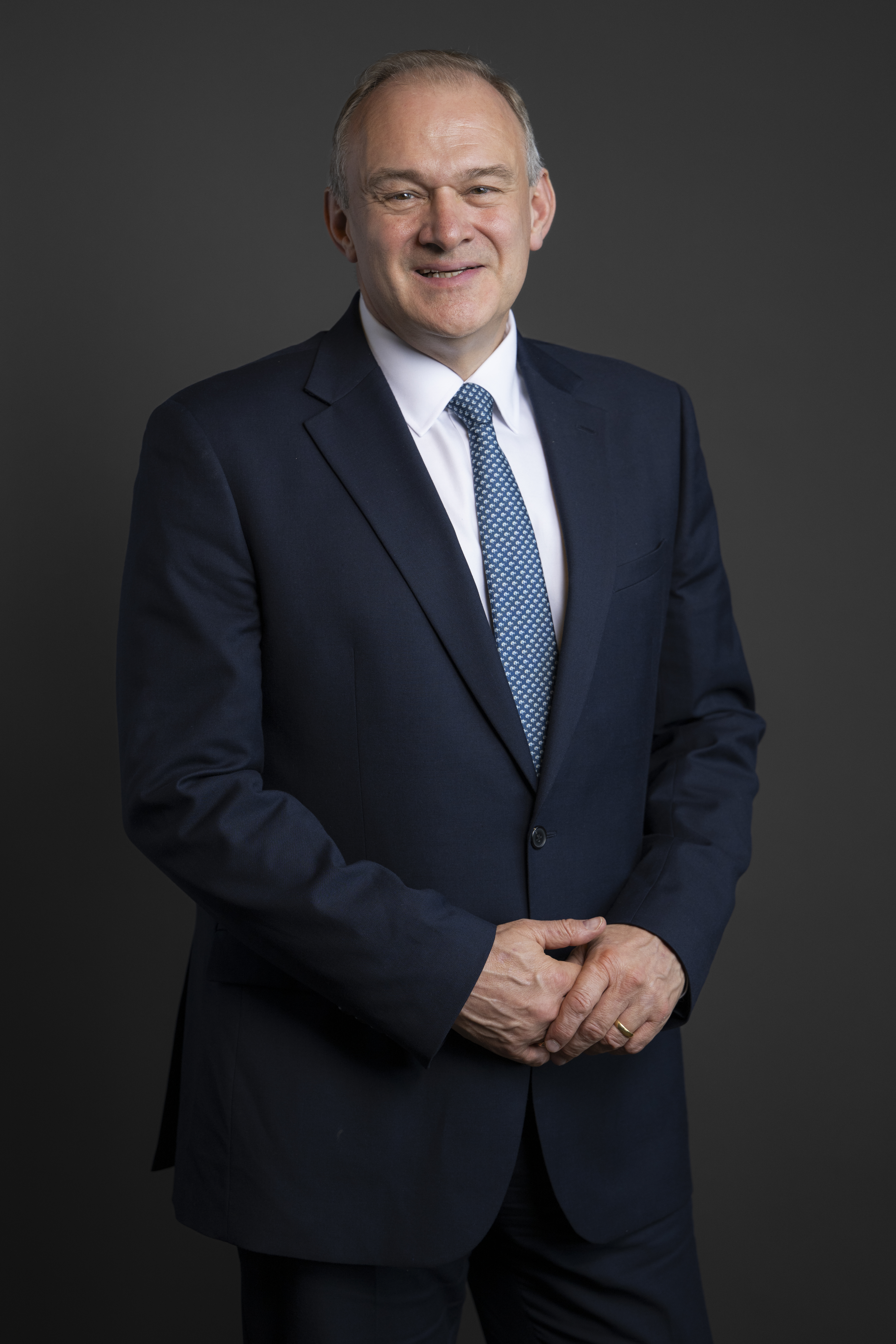
- Incumbent; Sir Ed Davey since 27 August 2020 (Note: Acting: 13 December 2019-27 August 2020.)
- Member of: Liberal Democrat frontbench team; Liberal Democrats Federal Board
- Appointer: Liberal Democrats membership
- Term length: No fixed term, at least 1 leadership election must be held in each Westminster Parliament unless the leader is a member of the government.
- Inaugural holder: David Steel; Bob Maclennan
- Formation: 3 March 1988
- Website: Official website

The Liberal Democrats are a political party in the United Kingdom. Party members elect the leader of the Liberal Democrats, the head and highest-ranking member of the party. Liberal Democrat members of Parliament also elect a deputy leader of the Parliamentary Party in the House of Commons, often colloquially referred to as the deputy leader. Under the federal constitution of the Liberal Democrats the leader is required to be a member of the House of Commons.

Before the election of the first federal leader of the party (the Liberal Democrats having a federal structure in their internal party organisation), the leaders of the two parties which merged to form the Liberal Democrats, the Liberal Party and the Social Democratic Party (SDP), served as joint interim leaders: David Steel and Bob Maclennan respectively.

If the leader dies, resigns or loses their seat in Parliament, the deputy leader (if there is one) serves as interim leader until a leadership election takes place. This has occurred three times, with Menzies Campbell serving as interim leader following the resignation of Charles Kennedy (Campbell was elected leader in the ensuing election) and Vince Cable serving as interim leader following Campbell's resignation. Jo Swinson lost her seat in the general election held on 12 December 2019, thus ceasing to be leader; Deputy Leader Ed Davey and Party President Sal Brinton became acting co-leaders. Brinton was replaced by Mark Pack following his assuming the office of party president on 1 January 2020. Davey won the Leadership election and became Leader on 27 August 2020 at the 2020 Liberal Democrats leadership election.

== Leaders ==
Leader (Birth–Death)		Portrait	Constituency	Took office	Left office	Tenure	Prime Minister	
—	David Steel (born 1938)		Tweeddale, Ettrick, and Lauderdale	3 March 1988	16 July 1988	135 days	Thatcher	1979–1990
—	Robert Maclennan (1936–2020)		Caithness and Sutherland	3 March 1988	16 July 1988	135 days	Thatcher	1979–1990
1	Paddy Ashdown (1941–2018)		Yeovil	16 July 1988 (Elected)	9 August 1999	11 years, 24 days	Thatcher	1979–1990
1	Paddy Ashdown (1941–2018)		Yeovil	16 July 1988 (Elected)	9 August 1999	11 years, 24 days	Major	1990–1997
1	Paddy Ashdown (1941–2018)		Yeovil	16 July 1988 (Elected)	9 August 1999	11 years, 24 days	Blair	1997–2007
2	Charles Kennedy (1959–2015)		Ross, Skye and Inverness West (1999–2005); Ross, Skye and Lochaber (2005–2006)	9 August 1999 (Elected)	7 January 2006	6 years, 151 days	Blair	1997–2007
—	Menzies Campbell (1941–2025)		North East Fife	7 January 2006	2 March 2006	54 days	Blair	1997–2007
3	Menzies Campbell (1941–2025)		North East Fife	2 March 2006 (Elected)	15 October 2007	1 year, 227 days	Blair	1997–2007
3	Menzies Campbell (1941–2025)		North East Fife	2 March 2006 (Elected)	15 October 2007	1 year, 227 days	Brown	2007–2010
—	Sir Vince Cable (born 1943)		Twickenham	15 October 2007	18 December 2007	64 days	Brown	2007–2010
4	Nick Clegg (Note: Deputy Prime Minister as part of the Coalition with the Conservative Party; resigned on 8 May 2015 following the 2015 general election, but formally retained leadership until a successor was chosen.) (born 1967)		Sheffield Hallam	18 December 2007 (Elected)	16 July 2015	7 years, 210 days	Brown	2007–2010
4	Nick Clegg (born 1967)		Sheffield Hallam	18 December 2007 (Elected)	16 July 2015	7 years, 210 days	Cameron	2010–2016
5	Tim Farron (born 1970)		Westmorland and Lonsdale	16 July 2015 (Elected)	20 July 2017	2 years, 4 days	Cameron	2010–2016
5	Tim Farron (born 1970)		Westmorland and Lonsdale	16 July 2015 (Elected)	20 July 2017	2 years, 4 days	May	2016–2019
6	Vince Cable (born 1943)		Twickenham	20 July 2017 (Unopposed)	22 July 2019	2 years, 2 days	May	2016–2019
7	Jo Swinson (born 1980)		East Dunbartonshire	22 July 2019 (Elected)	13 December 2019	144 days	Johnson	2019–2022
—	Baroness Brinton (born 1955)		Life Peer	13 December 2019	1 January 2020	19 days	Johnson	2019–2022
—	Ed Davey (born 1965)		Kingston and Surbiton	13 December 2019	1 January 2020	258 days	Johnson	2019–2022
—	Ed Davey (born 1965)		Kingston and Surbiton	1 January 2020	27 August 2020	258 days	Johnson	2019–2022
—	Mark Pack (born 1970)		Extraparliamentary	1 January 2020	27 August 2020	239 days	Johnson	2019–2022
8	Ed Davey (born 1965)		Kingston and Surbiton	27 August 2020 (Elected)	Incumbent	6 years, 47 days	Johnson	2019–2022
8	Ed Davey (born 1965)		Kingston and Surbiton	27 August 2020 (Elected)	Incumbent	6 years, 47 days	Truss	2022
8	Ed Davey (born 1965)		Kingston and Surbiton	27 August 2020 (Elected)	Incumbent	6 years, 47 days	Sunak	2022–2024
8	Ed Davey (born 1965)		Kingston and Surbiton	27 August 2020 (Elected)	Incumbent	6 years, 47 days	Starmer	2024–2026
8	Ed Davey (born 1965)		Kingston and Surbiton	27 August 2020 (Elected)	Incumbent	6 years, 47 days	Burnham	2026–present

== See also ==
- List of United Kingdom Whig and allied party leaders, 1801–1859
- Leader of the Conservative Party (UK)
- Leader of the Labour Party (UK)
- Leader of the Liberal Party (UK)
