= Frontbench team of Ed Davey =

UK Liberal Democrat team from 2020

Frontbench Team of Ed Davey
- 2020–present
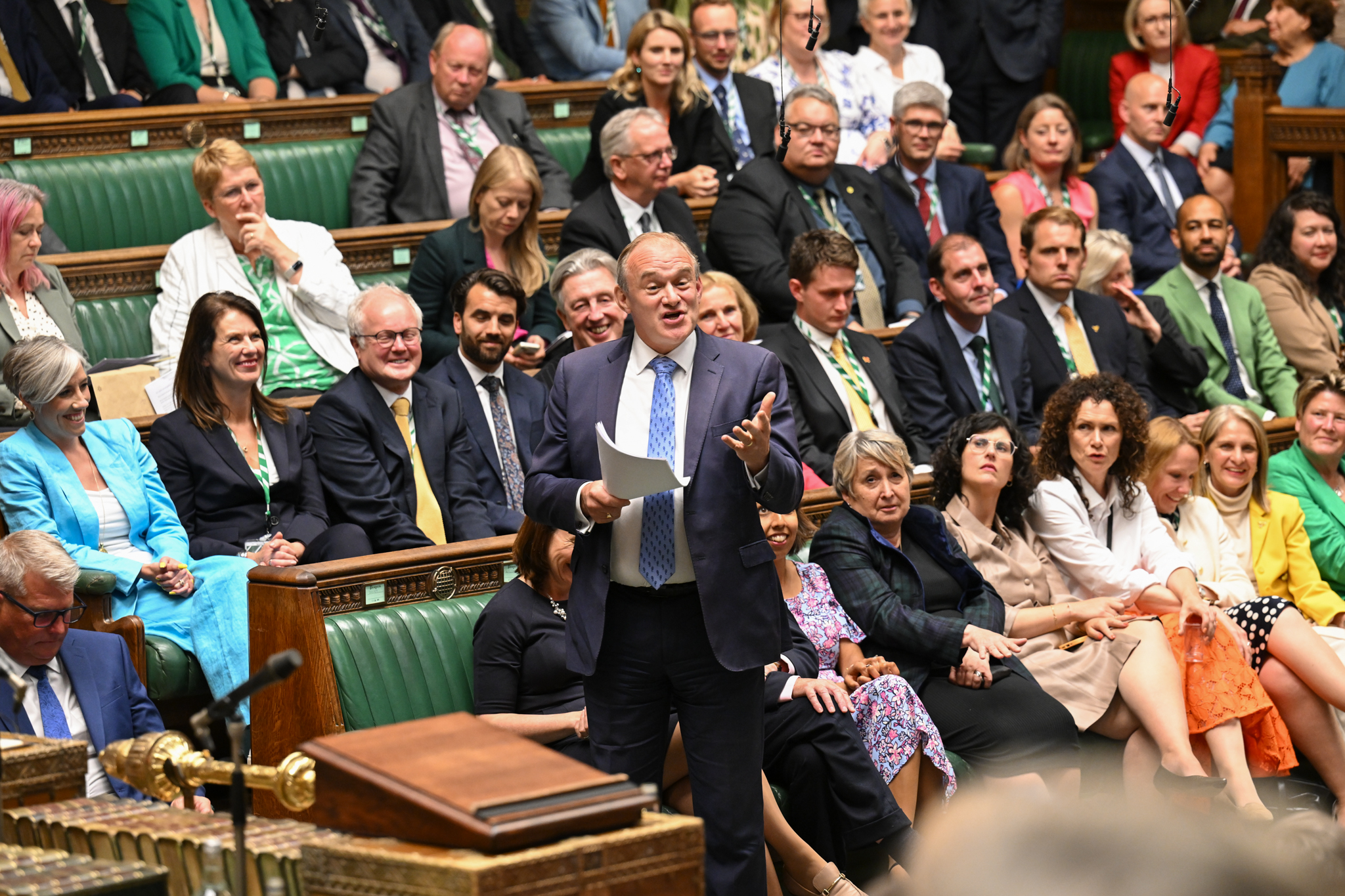
- Date formed: 27 August 2020

People and organisations
- Monarch: Elizabeth II; Charles III
- Leader: Ed Davey
- Deputy Leader: Daisy Cooper
- Member party: Liberal Democrats
- Status in legislature: Third party 72 / 650 (11%) (As of July 2024) Opposition 15 / 650 (2%) (2020 - 2024)

History
- Incoming formation: 2019 General Election; 2020 Liberal Democrats leadership election
- Election: 2024 General Election
- Legislature terms: 2019 UK Parliament; 2024 UK Parliament
- Predecessor: Frontbench Team of Jo Swinson

Ed Davey was appointed as Acting Leader of the Liberal Democrats following the resignation of Jo Swinson. Davey announced his first frontbench team as Acting Leader in January 2020.

Davey was elected permanent Leader on 27 August 2020 and assembled a new frontbench team in the following days. After the 2024 general election, Davey's frontbench team became the second largest opposition party to the governing Labour Party, behind the Sunak shadow cabinet.

On 18 September 2024, following the party conference, Davey announced a new 33-member frontbench team, with new members taking frontbench roles. This left 39 backbench MPs, more than twice the number of Liberal Democrat MPs prior to the election. This was also subsequent to former frontbench members Layla Moran, Alistair Carmichael, and Jamie Stone standing down from the frontbench after being elected to chair parliamentary select committees.

The frontbench was reshuffled in September 2025 following the Liberal Democrat Conference in Bournemouth.

Frontbench Teams since 1997
Ashdown Team (1997–1999)
Kennedy Team (1999–2006)
Campbell Team (2006–2007)
First Cable Team (2007)
Clegg Team (2007–2010)
General Election Cabinet (2015)
Farron Team (2015–2017)
Second Cable Team (2017–2019)
Swinson Team (2019)
Davey Team (2020–present)

== Frontbench team history ==
=== January 2020 – August 2020 ===
| Portfolio | Holder |
|---|---|
| Acting Leader of the Liberal Democrats; Economy and Social Justice | Ed Davey; MP |
| Home Affairs; Women and Equalities | Christine Jardine; MP |
| Foreign Affairs; Brexit; Chief Whip | Alistair Carmichael; MP |
| Climate Emergency, Energy and the Environment | Wera Hobhouse; MP |
| Housing, Local Government, Food and Rural Affairs; North of England | Tim Farron; MP |
| Education | Layla Moran; MP |
| Health, Wellbeing & Social Care; Transport | Munira Wilson; MP |
| Defence | Jamie Stone; MP |
| Business and Trade | Sarah Olney; MP |
| Justice; Digital, Culture, Media and Sport | Daisy Cooper; MP |
| Political & Constitutional Reform; Scotland; Wales; Northern Ireland; International Development | Wendy Chamberlain; MP |

==== Changes from Swinson's final Team ====
- Chuka Umunna (Foreign Affairs and International Trade) lost his seat and was replaced by Alistair Carmichael in the former and Sarah Olney in the latter
- Sam Gyimah (Business, Energy and Industrial Strategy) lost his seat and was replaced by Wera Hobhouse (Climate Emergency, Energy and the Environment) and Sarah Olney (Business and Trade)
- Angela Smith (International Development) lost her seat and was replaced by replaced by Wendy Chamberlain
- Phillip Lee (Justice) lost his seat and was replaced by Daisy Cooper
- Tom Brake (Brexit and Chancellor of the Duchy of Lancaster) lost his seat and was replaced in the former by Alistair Carmichael, the latter remained vacant
- Luciana Berger (Health and Social Care) lost her seat and was replaced by Munira Wilson
- Vince Cable (Cabinet Office) retired from the commons and was not replaced, although Wendy Chamberlain took on a similar role called Political & Constitutional Reform spokesperson
- Jane Dodds (Wales and Food and Rural Affairs) lost her seat and was succeeded in the former by Wendy Chamberlain and by Tim Farron in the latter.
- In addition to Justice, Daisy Cooper also took over as Digital, Culture, Media and Sport spokesperson from Layla Moran who continued as Education spokesperson
- In addition to International Development and Wales, Wendy Chamberlain also took over Northern Ireland from Alistair Carmichael

=== September 2020 – July 2022 ===
Following Davey's election as party leader, he reshuffled his frontbench team.

| Portfolio | Holder |
|---|---|
| Leader of the Liberal Democrats | Ed Davey; MP |
| Deputy Leader of the Liberal Democrats; Education (until October 2021); Health, Wellbeing & Social Care (from October 2021) | Daisy Cooper; MP |
| Treasury | Christine Jardine; MP |
| Home Affairs; Political and Constitutional Reform; Northern Ireland | Alistair Carmichael; MP |
| Foreign Affairs; International Development | Layla Moran; MP |
| Housing, Communities and Local Government; Food and Rural Affairs; North of England | Tim Farron; MP |
| Health, Wellbeing & Social Care (until October 2021); Education (from October 2021) | Munira Wilson; MP |
| Business and Trade; Transport | Sarah Olney; MP |
| Climate Emergency and Energy; Justice; Women and Equalities | Wera Hobhouse; MP |
| Defence; Digital, Culture, Media and Sport | Jamie Stone; MP |
| Scotland; Wales; Work and Pensions; Chief Whip | Wendy Chamberlain; MP |

==== Changes ====
- Christine Jardine took over as Treasury spokesperson from Davey
- Alistair Carmichael took over Jardine's role of Home Affairs spokesperson and also replaced Chamberlain as Northern Ireland spokesperson.
- Layla Moran replaced Carmichael as Foreign Affairs spokesperson and as International Development spokesperson from Chamberlain
- Daisy Cooper replaced Moran as Education spokesperson, she also became Deputy Leader of the Liberal Democrats
- Sarah Olney replaced Munira Wilson as Transport spokesperson while remaining Business and Trade spokesperson
- Wera Hobhouse replaced Cooper as Justice spokesperson and as Women and Equalities spokesperson from Jardine
- Jamie Stone replaced Cooper as Digital, Culture, Media and Sport spokesperson while remaining Defence spokesperson
- Wendy Chamberlain replaced Carmichael as Chief Whip, while remaining Scotland and Wales spokesperson and becoming Work and Pensions spokesperson.

==== Later changes ====
- In October 2021, Munira Wilson (Health and Social Care) and Daisy Cooper (Education) swapped portfolios

=== July 2022 – October 2024 ===
Following several by-election victories, Davey reshuffled his frontbench team to include the party's new MPs.

| Portfolio | Holder |
|---|---|
| Leader of the Liberal Democrats | Ed Davey; MP |
| Deputy Leader of the Liberal Democrats; Health and Social Care | Daisy Cooper; MP |
| Treasury; Business and Industrial Strategy | Sarah Olney; MP |
| Home Affairs; Justice; Northern Ireland | Alistair Carmichael; MP |
| Foreign Affairs; International Development | Layla Moran; MP |
| Work and Pensions; Chief Whip | Wendy Chamberlain; MP |
| Education | Munira Wilson; MP |
| Environment, Food and Rural Affairs | Tim Farron; MP |
| Cabinet Office; Woman and Equalities; Scotland | Christine Jardine; MP |
| Housing, Communities and Local Government | Helen Morgan; MP |
| Culture, Media and Sport; Defence (until October 2022) | Jamie Stone; MP |
| Energy and Climate Change; Transport; Leader of the House of Commons | Wera Hobhouse; MP |
| International Trade; Wales | Sarah Green; MP |
| Defence (from October 2022) | Richard Foord; MP |

==== Changes ====
- Sarah Olney took over Treasury from Christine Jardine, while remaining Business spokesperson
- Alistair Carmichael took over Justice from Wera Hobhouse, while remaining Home Affairs and Northern Ireland spokesperson
- Helen Morgan took over Housing, Communities and Local Government from Tim Farron while the latter remained Environment, Food and Rural Affairs spokesperson
- Christine Jardine took over Women and Equalities from Hobhouse and Scotland from Chamberlain while also becoming Cabinet Office spokesperson
- Sarah Green took over Wales from Chamberlain and International Trade from Olney
- Wera Hobhouse took over Transport from Olney and became Leader of the House of Commons spokesperson
- Richard Foord took over Defence from Jamie Stone while the latter remained Culture, Media and Sport spokesperson.

=== October 2024 – September 2025 ===
Following significant gains at the 2024 general election, Davey reshuffled his frontbench team to "champion the people’s priorities". It included the departures of Layla Moran (Foreign Affairs), Alistair Carmichael (Home Affairs) and Jamie Stone (Culture, Media and Sport) who became Select Committee Chairs.

| Portfolio | Holder |
|---|---|
| Leader of the Liberal Democrats | Ed Davey; MP |
| Deputy Leader of the Liberal Democrats; Treasury | Daisy Cooper; MP |
| Home Affairs | Lisa Smart; MP |
| Foreign Affairs | Calum Miller; MP |
| Chief Whip | Wendy Chamberlain; MP |
| Health and Social Care | Helen Morgan; MP |
| Education, Children and Families | Munira Wilson; MP |
| Environment, Food and Rural Affairs | Tim Farron; MP |
| Cabinet Office | Sarah Olney; MP |
| Woman and Equalities; Scotland | Christine Jardine; MP |
| Justice | Josh Babarinde; OBE MP |
| Business | Sarah Gibson; MP |
| Energy Security and Net Zero | Pippa Heylings; MP |
| Housing, Communities and Local Government | Vikki Slade; MP |
| Transport | Paul Kohler; MP |
| Science, Innovation and Technology | Victoria Collins; MP |
| Culture, Media and Sport | Max Wilkinson; MP |
| Defence | Helen Maguire; BEM MP |
| Work and Pensions | Steve Darling; MP |
| Wales | David Chadwick; MP |
| Northern Ireland | Al Pinkerton; MP |
| London | Luke Taylor; MP |
| Hospitals and Primary Care | Jess Brown-Fuller; MP |
| Care and Carers | Alison Bennett; MP |
| Mental Health | Danny Chambers; MP |
| Universities and Skills | Ian Sollom; MP |
| Trade | Clive Jones; MP |
| International Development | Monica Harding; MP |
| Europe | James MacCleary; MP |
| Housing and Planning | Gideon Amos; OBE MP |
| Leader of the House of Commons | Marie Goldman; MP |
| Attorney General | Ben Maguire; MP |
| Deputy Chief Whip | Tom Morrison; MP |

==== Changes ====
- Daisy Cooper took over Treasury from Sarah Olney
- Helen Morgan took over Health and Social Care from Cooper
- Sarah Olney took over Cabinet Office from Christine Jardine while the latter remained Women and Equalities and Scotland spokesperson
- Calum Miller took over Foreign Affairs from Layla Moran, who now chairs the Health and Social Care Select Committee
- Lisa Smart took over Home Affairs from Alistair Carmichael, who now chairs the Environment, Food and Rural Affairs Select Committee
- Josh Babarinde took over Justice from Carmichael
- Sarah Gibson took over Business from Olney
- Pippa Heylings took over Energy Security and Net Zero from Wera Hobhouse
- Vikki Slade took over Housing, Communities and Local Government from Morgan
- Paul Kohler took over Transport from Hobhouse
- Victoria Collins became Science, Innovation and Technology Spokesperson
- Max Wilkinson took over Culture, Media and Sport from Jamie Stone who now chairs the Petitions Committee
- Helen Maguire took over Defence from Richard Foord
- Steve Darling took over Work and Pensions from Wendy Chamberlain while the latter remained Chief Whip
- David Chadwick took over Wales from Sarah Green
- Al Pinkerton took over Northern Ireland from Carmichael
- Luke Taylor became London Spokesperson
- Jess Brown-Fuller became Hospitals and Primary Care Spokesperson
- Alison Bennett became Mental Health Spokesperson
- Ian Sollom became Universities and Skills Spokesperson
- Clive Jones took over Trade from Green
- Monica Harding took over International Development from Moran
- James MacCleary became Europe Spokesperson
- Gideon Amos became Housing and Planning Spokesperson
- Marie Goldman became Shadow Leader of the House of Commons
- Ben Maguire became Shadow Attorney General
- Tom Morrison became Deputy Chief Whip

=== September 2025 – present ===
| Portfolio | Current holder | Term |
|---|---|---|
| Leader | Ed Davey; MP | August 2020 – present |
| Deputy Leader | Daisy Cooper; MP | September 2020 – present |
| Treasury | Daisy Cooper; MP | September 2024 – present |
| Chief Whip | Wendy Chamberlain; MP | September 2020 – present |
| Home Affairs | Max Wilkinson; MP | October 2025 – present |
| Foreign Affairs | Calum Miller; MP | September 2024 – present |
| Health and Social Care | Helen Morgan; MP | September 2024 – present |
| Education, Children and Families | Munira Wilson; MP | October 2021–present |
| Environment, Food and Rural Affairs | Tim Farron; MP | January 2020–present |
| Cabinet Office | Lisa Smart; MP | October 2025 – present |
| Business | Sarah Olney; MP | October 2025 – present |
| Work and Pensions | Steve Darling; MP | September 2024 – present |
| Investment & Trade | Joshua Reynolds; MP | October 2025 – present |
| Shadow Chief Secretary to the Treasury | Charlie Maynard; MP | October 2025 – October 2026 |
| Justice | Jess Brown-Fuller; MP | October 2025 – present |
| Attorney General's Office | Ben Maguire; MP | September 2024–present |
| Women and Equalities | Marie Goldman; MP | October 2025 – present |
| Defence | James MacCleary; MP | October 2025 – present |
| International Development | Monica Harding; MP | September 2024 – present |
| Europe | Al Pinkerton; MP | October 2025 – present |
| Primary Care and Cancer | Helen Maguire; MP | October 2025 – present |
| Care and Carers | Alison Bennett; MP | September 2024 – October 2026 |
| Care and Carers | Clive Jones; MP | October 2026 – present |
| Mental Health | Danny Chambers; MP | September 2024 – present |
| Science, Innovation, and Technology | Victoria Collins; MP | September 2024 – present |
| Universities and Skills | Ian Sollom; MP | September 2024 – present |
| Culture, Media and Sport | Anna Sabine; MP | October 2025 – present |
| Schools | Caroline Voaden; MP | October 2025 – present |
| Energy Security and Net Zero | Pippa Heylings; MP | September 2024 – present |
| Transport | Olly Glover; MP | October 2025 – present |
| Housing and Planning | Gideon Amos; MP | September 2024 – present |
| Local Government | Zöe Franklin; MP | October 2025 – present |
| Rural Affairs | Sarah Dyke; MP | October 2025 – present |
| Northern Ireland | Paul Kohler; MP | October 2025 – present |
| Scotland | Susan Murray; MP | October 2025 – present |
| Wales | David Chadwick; MP | September 2024 – present |
| London | Luke Taylor; MP | September 2024 – present |
| Immigration | Will Forster MP | October 2025 – September 2026 |
| Deputy Chief Whip | Will Forster MP | September 2026 – present |
| Deputy Chief Whip | Tom Morrison; MP | September 2024 – September 2026 |
| Shadow Leader of the House of Commons | Bobby Dean; MP | October 2025 – present |

==== Changes ====
- Lisa Smart took over Cabinet Office from Sarah Olney
- Max Wilkinson took over Home Affairs from Smart
- Sarah Olney took over Business from Sarah Gibson
- Jess Brown-Fuller took over Justice from Josh Babarinde who later became President of the Liberal Democrats
- Gideon Amos took over Housing and Communities from Vikki Slade
- Marie Goldman took over Women and Equalities from Christine Jardine
- Olly Glover took over Transport from Paul Kohler
- Anna Sabine took over Culture, Media and Sport from Max Wilkinson
- James MacCleary took over Defence from Helen Maguire
- Susan Murray took over Scotland from Jardine
- Paul Kohler took over Northern Ireland from Al Pinkerton
- Helen Maguire took over Primary Care and Cancer from Jess Brown-Fuller
- Caroline Voaden became Schools Spokesperson
- Will Forster became Immigration Spokesperson
- Joshua Reynolds took over Trade from Clive Jones
- Al Pinkerton took over Europe from James MacCleary
- Zöe Franklin took over Local Government from Vikki Slade
- Sarah Dyke became Rural Affairs spokesperson alongside Tim Farron
- Charlie Maynard became Shadow Chief Secretary to the Treasury
- Bobby Dean took over Shadow Leader of the House of Commons from Marie Goldman

==== Subsequent changes ====
- In September 2026 Will Forster replaced Tom Morrison as Deputy Chief Whip.
- On 5 October 2026 Alison Bennett resigned as Care and Carers spokesperson, she was replaced by Clive Jones.
- On 9 October 2026 Charlie Maynard resigned as Chief Secretary to the Treasury spokesperson.

=== Other Spokespeople ===
| Portfolio | Name |
In the House of Lords
| Leader of the Liberal Democrats in the House of Lords | Lord Purvis of Tweed |
| Lords Spokesperson for Foreign, Commonwealth and Developmental Affairs | Lord Purvis of Tweed |
| Lords Spokesperson for International Development | Lord Purvis of Tweed |
| Lords Spokesperson for International Trade | Lord Purvis of Tweed |
| Lords Chief Whip | Lord Goddard of Stockport |
| Lords Spokesperson for AI and Digital | Lord Clement-Jones |
| Lords Spokesperson for Business | Lord Fox |
| Lords Spokesperson for Cabinet Office | Lord Pack |
| Lords Spokesperson for Defence | Baroness Smith of Newnham |
| Lords Spokesperson for Digital, Culture, Media and Sport | Baroness Bonham-Carter of Yarnbury |
| Lords Spokesperson for Education | Lord Mohammed of Tinsley |
| Lords Spokesperson for Energy and Climate Change | Earl Russell |
| Lords Spokesperson for Environment, Food and Rural Affairs | Baroness Grender |
| Lords Spokesperson for Transport | Baroness Grender |
| Lords Spokesperson for Equalities | Baroness Hussein-Ece OBE |
| Lords Spokesperson for Health | Baroness Pidgeon MBE |
| Lords Spokesperson for Home Office (Immigration) | Lord German OBE |
| Lords Spokesperson for Home Office (Victims and Abuse) | Baroness Brinton |
| Lords Spokesperson for Policing | Baroness Doocey OBE |
| Lords Spokesperson for Housing, Communities and Local Government | Baroness Pinnock |
| Lords Spokesperson for Housing | Baroness Thornhill MBE |
| Lords Spokesperson for Justice | Lord Marks of Henley-on-Thames KC |
| Lords Spokesperson for Northern Ireland | Baroness Suttie |
| Lords Spokesperson for Scotland | Lord Bruce of Bennachie |
| Lords Spokesperson for Treasury and Economy | Baroness Kramer |
| Lords Spokesperson for Voluntary Sector | Baroness Barker |
| Lords Spokesperson for Wales | Baroness Humphreys |
| Lords Spokesperson for Work and Pensions | Lord Palmer of Childs Hill OBE FCA |
Welsh Liberal Democrats
| Leader of the Welsh Liberal Democrats | Jane Dodds MS |
| Deputy Leader of the Welsh Liberal Democrats | David Chadwick MP |
Scottish Liberal Democrats
| Leader of the Scottish Liberal Democrats | Alex Cole-Hamilton MSP |
| Deputy Leader of the Scottish Liberal Democrats | Wendy Chamberlain MP |
Other
| Leader of the Liberal Democrats in the London Assembly | Hina Bokhari OBE AM |
| President of the Liberal Democrats | Josh Babarinde OBE MP |
| Vice President of the Liberal Democrats | Victoria Collins MP |

== See also ==
- Cabinet of the United Kingdom
- Official Opposition Shadow Cabinet (United Kingdom)
- Frontbench Team of Stephen Flynn
- Frontbench team of Nigel Farage
