= English Liberal Democrats =

English branch of the Liberal Democrats

- Chair: Baroness Caroline Pidgeon
- Founded: 1988
- Headquarters: 66 Buckingham Gate, London, SW1E 6AU
- Youth wing: English Young Liberals
- Ideology: Liberalism; Social liberalism Classical liberalism Pro-Europeanism
- Political position: Centre to centre-left
- National affiliation: Liberal Democrats
- European affiliation: Alliance of Liberals and Democrats for Europe Party
- International affiliation: Liberal International
- Colours: Orange
- House of Commons (English Seats): 65 / 543
- London Assembly: 2 / 25
- Local government in England: 3,209 / 16,635

Website
- www.englishlibdems.org.uk

The English Liberal Democrats, constitutionally the Liberal Democrats in England, is the state party within the Liberal Democrats that operates in England. It is a federation of the eleven regional parties in England and the English branch of the youth and student organisation. The regions are further divided into local parties. The party currently holds 65 of the English seats in the House of Commons and two seats on the London Assembly.

== Organisation ==
=== English Assembly ===
The English Assembly, known as the English Council before 2026, is the sovereign body of the English party. It consists of the chairs of regional parties, representatives elected by regional party members, and representatives of the organisation representing youth and student members within the English party.

=== English Party Board ===
The English Party Board, known as the English Council Executive before 2026, manages the running of the English party between English Assembly meetings. The board consists of the chairs of the 11 English regional parties, additional members elected from the English Assembly and the chair of the English Young Liberals. English Representatives to federal bodies also attend. The English board meets 6 times a year.

The English Party Board has four sub-committees; A Finance and Administration Sub-Committee which is chaired by a Treasurer manages the finances of the English party, the Regional Parties Committee, the Joint Policy Group of the Regions and the English Candidates Committee.

The English Party Board is elected annually in November, and takes office on 1 January each year. The current Board consists of:

Role	Name
Chair	Caroline Pidgeon
Vice-Chair (Regional Parties Committee Chair)	Brian Orrell
Vice-Chair (Regional Development)	James Read
Treasurer	Richard Flowers
English Candidates Committee Chair	Margaret Joachim
English Young Liberals Chair	Joe Norris
English Executive Members	Prue Bray
English Executive Members	Richard Cole
English Executive Members	Kian Hearnshaw
English Executive Members	Brian Orrell
English Executive Members	Iain Donaldson
English Executive Members	Fergus Ustianowski
English Executive Members	James Read
English Executive Members	Oliver Jones-Lyons
English Executive Members	William Houngbo
English Executive Members	Mark Johnston
English Executive Members	Rachelle Shepherd-Dubey
English Executive Members	Simon Pike

Role	Name
English Representatives to the Federal Council	Prue Bray, Richard Flowers, Pete Dollimore
English Representative to Federal Policy Committee	Sally Burnell
English Representative to Federal Conference Committee	Darryl Smalley
English Representative to the Federal Campaigns and Elections Committee	Iain Donaldson
English Representative to the Federal People Development Committee	Pete Dollimore
English Representative to the Federal International Relations Committee	Sean Bennett

=== Regional parties ===
The English Liberal Democrats is a federation of the eleven regional parties which follow the boundaries of the English Regions, with the exception of South East England and South West England which are each divided into two regional parties. Each regional party is governed by a conference and AGM held in the autumn of every year. The conference elects a Regional Executive, led by a Regional Chair. The regional executive includes all Liberal Democrat members of parliament representing constituencies within the region, all members of the House of Lords who are members of the regional party, ordinary party members elected from within the region, and additional members co-opted by the executive.

The regional parties within the English party are:

- Devon and Cornwall (South West England)
- East of England
- East Midlands
- London Liberal Democrats
- North East England
- North West England
- South Central (South East England)
- South East (South East England)
- Western Counties (South West England)
- West Midlands
- Yorkshire

=== English Young Liberals ===
The English Young Liberals operates as a federation of regional parties, with each having a level of independence, though working within the overall English wing. Regional branches, led by their Chair, are responsible for organising and supporting local branches and societies and co-ordinating activities to recruit and expand membership in their region.

== Policy and functions ==
The English party has responsibilities for the organisation of local parties, co-ordination of the activities of regional parties, resolution of disputes between regional parties, selection of English representatives to federal bodies and establishing the rules for selection of party candidates.

The English Party constitution states that the Liberal Democrats in England "shall determine the policy of the Party on matters affecting England which fall outside the remit of the Federal Party" This can be achieved by structures established by the English Council. As no policy making structures are currently in place, policy making has been passed up to federal level and English policies discussed at federal party conferences.

=== English devolution ===
In 2021 the Liberal Democrats adopted a policy motion, "A Framework for England in a Federal UK", which called for the establishment of elected regional assemblies throughout England. The regional assemblies would nominate members to concurrently serve on an "English National Chamber" to legislate at an all-England level with England being a single legal jurisdiction within a federal United Kingdom.

The English regional assemblies would have the following competencies:

- Regional economic development
- NHS and social care services
- Policing
- Strategic housing and planning policy
- Regional transport
- Education, including skills
- Agriculture and rural affairs
- Local environmental and decarbonisation policy

The English National Chamber would have the following competencies:

- The legal system
- Higher education and universities

== Elected representatives ==
=== Members of Parliament ===
	Constituency	Name	Majority (vote)	Majority (%)
1	Bath	Wera Hobhouse	11,218	23.3
2	Bicester and Woodstock	Calum Miller	4,958	9.9
3	Carshalton and Wallington	Bobby Dean	7,905	16.9
4	Cheadle	Tom Morrison	12,235	24.1
5	Chelmsford	Marie Goldman	4,753	9.4
6	Cheltenham	Max Wilkinson	7,210	14.6
7	Chesham and Amersham	Sarah Green	5,451	10.0
8	Chichester	Jess Brown-Fuller	12,172	23.4
9	Chippenham	Sarah Gibson	8,138	16.4
10	Didcot and Wantage	Olly Glover	6,233	11.4
11	Dorking and Horley	Chris Coghlan	5,391	10.8
12	Eastbourne	Josh Babarinde	12,204	26.8
13	Eastleigh	Liz Jarvis	1,546	3.3
14	Ely and East Cambridgeshire	Charlotte Cane	495	0.9
15	Epsom and Ewell	Helen Maguire	9,957	19.4
16	Esher and Walton	Monica Harding	12,003	22.3
17	Frome and East Somerset	Anna Sabine	5,415	11.6
18	Glastonbury and Somerton	Sarah Dyke	6,611	13.9
19	Guildford	Zöe Franklin	8,429	17.5
20	Harpenden and Berkhamsted	Victoria Collins	10,708	19.7
21	Harrogate and Knaresborough	Tom Gordon	8,238	15.8
22	Hazel Grove	Lisa Smart	6,500	14.1
23	Henley and Thame	Freddie van Mierlo	6,267	11.8
24	Honiton and Sidmouth	Richard Foord	6,700	13.2
25	Horsham	John Milne	2,517	4.5
26	Kingston and Surbiton	Ed Davey	17,235	34.0
27	Lewes	James MacCleary	12,624	23.7
28	Maidenhead	Joshua Reynolds	2,963	5.9
29	Melksham and Devizes	Brian Mathew	2,401	4.7
30	Mid Dorset and North Poole	Vikki Slade	1,352	2.7
31	Mid Sussex	Alison Bennett	6,662	12.5
32	Newbury	Lee Dillon	2,377	4.9
33	Newton Abbot	Martin Wrigley	2,246	4.7
34	North Cornwall	Ben Maguire	9,957	19.4
35	North Devon	Ian Roome	6,744	13.1
36	North East Hampshire	Alex Brewer	634	1.1
37	North Norfolk	Steffan Aquarone	2,585	5.5
38	North Shropshire	Helen Morgan	15,311	30.9
39	Oxford West and Abingdon	Layla Moran	14,894	32.4
40	Richmond Park	Sarah Olney	17,155	32.9
41	South Cambridgeshire	Pippa Heylings	10,641	19.4
42	South Cotswolds	Roz Savage	4,973	9.5
43	South Devon	Caroline Voaden	7,127	14.5
44	St Albans	Daisy Cooper	19,834	38.4
45	St Ives	Andrew George	13,786	28.7
46	St Neots and Mid Cambridgeshire	Ian Sollom	4,621	8.7
47	Stratford-on-Avon	Manuela Perteghella	7,122	13.4
48	Surrey Heath	Al Pinkerton	5,640	11.8
49	Sutton and Cheam	Luke Taylor	3,801	8.0
50	Taunton and Wellington	Gideon Amos	11,939	23.7
51	Tewkesbury	Cameron Thomas	6,262	12.9
52	Thornbury and Yate	Claire Young	3,014	5.6
53	Tiverton and Minehead	Rachel Gilmour	3,507	7.4
54	Torbay	Steve Darling	5,349	11.6
55	Tunbridge Wells	Mike Martin	8,687	16.0
56	Twickenham	Munira Wilson	21,457	40.0
57	Wells and Mendip Hills	Tessa Munt	11,121	22.1
58	West Dorset	Edward Morello	7,789	14.8
59	Westmorland and Lonsdale	Tim Farron	21,472	43.3
60	Wimbledon	Paul Kohler	12,610	22.9
61	Winchester	Danny Chambers	13,821	24.2
62	Witney	Charlie Maynard	4,339	8.6
63	Woking	Will Forster	11,246	23.4
64	Wokingham	Clive Jones	8,345	15.5
65	Yeovil	Adam Dance	12,268	25.1

=== London Assembly members ===
- Hina Bokhari
- Gareth Roberts

=== Directly elected mayors ===
- Peter Taylor – Mayor of Watford

== Appointments ==
=== House of Lords ===
Peer	Ennobled	Notes
Dominic Hubbard, 6th Baron Addington	1986 (Hereditary)	
Lord Allan of Hallam	2010	
Lord Alliance	2004	
Baroness Bakewell of Hardington Mandeville	2013	
Lord Beith	2015	
Baroness Benjamin	2010	
Baroness Bonham-Carter of Yarnbury	2004	
Baroness Bowles of Berkhamsted	2015	
Lord Bradshaw	1999	
Baroness Brinton	2011	
Lord Burnett	2006	
Baroness Burt of Solihull	2015	
Lord Chidgey	2005	
Lord Clement-Jones	1998	
Lord Cotter	2006	
Lord Dholakia	1997	
Baroness Doocey	2010	
Baroness Featherstone	2015	
Lord Foster of Bath	2015	
Lord Fox	2014	
Baroness Garden of Frognal	2007	
Lord Goddard of Stockport	2014	
Baroness Grender	2013	
Baroness Hamwee	1991	
Baroness Harris of Richmond	1999	
Lord Hussain	2011	
Baroness Hussein-Ece	2010	
Baroness Janke	2014	
Baroness Jolly	2011	
Lord Jones of Cheltenham	2005	
Baroness Kramer	2010	
Lord Lee of Trafford	2006	
Baroness Ludford	1997	
Lord Marks of Henley-on-Thames	2011	
Lord McNally	1996	
Baroness Miller of Chilthorne Domer	1998	
Lord Newby	1997	
Baroness Northover	2000	
Lord Oates	2015	
Lord Paddick	2013	
Lord Palmer of Childs Hill	2011	
Baroness Parminter	2011	
Baroness Pinnock	2014	
Lord Razzall	1997	
Lord Redesdale	2000	
Lord Rennard	1999	
Lord Rodgers of Quarry Bank	1992	
Baroness Scott of Needham Market	2000	
Lord Scriven	2014	
Lord Sharkey	2010	
Baroness Sheehan	2015	
Lord Shipley	2010	
Baroness Smith of Newnham	2014	
Lord Stephen	2011	
Lord Stoneham of Droxford	2011	
Lord Storey	2011	
Lord Strasburger	2011	
Lord Stunell	2015	
Baroness Suttie	2013	
Lord Taverne	1996	
Lord Taylor of Goss Moor	2010	
Lord Teverson	2006	
Baroness Thomas of Winchester	2006	
Baroness Thornhill	2015	
Lord Tope	1994	
Lord Tyler	2005	
Baroness Tyler of Enfield	2011	
Lord Verjee	2013	
Lord Wallace of Saltaire	1995	
Baroness Walmsley	2000	
Lord Watson of Richmond	1999	
Lord Willis of Knaresborough	2010	
Lord Wrigglesworth	2013	

== List of chairs of the English Liberal Democrats ==
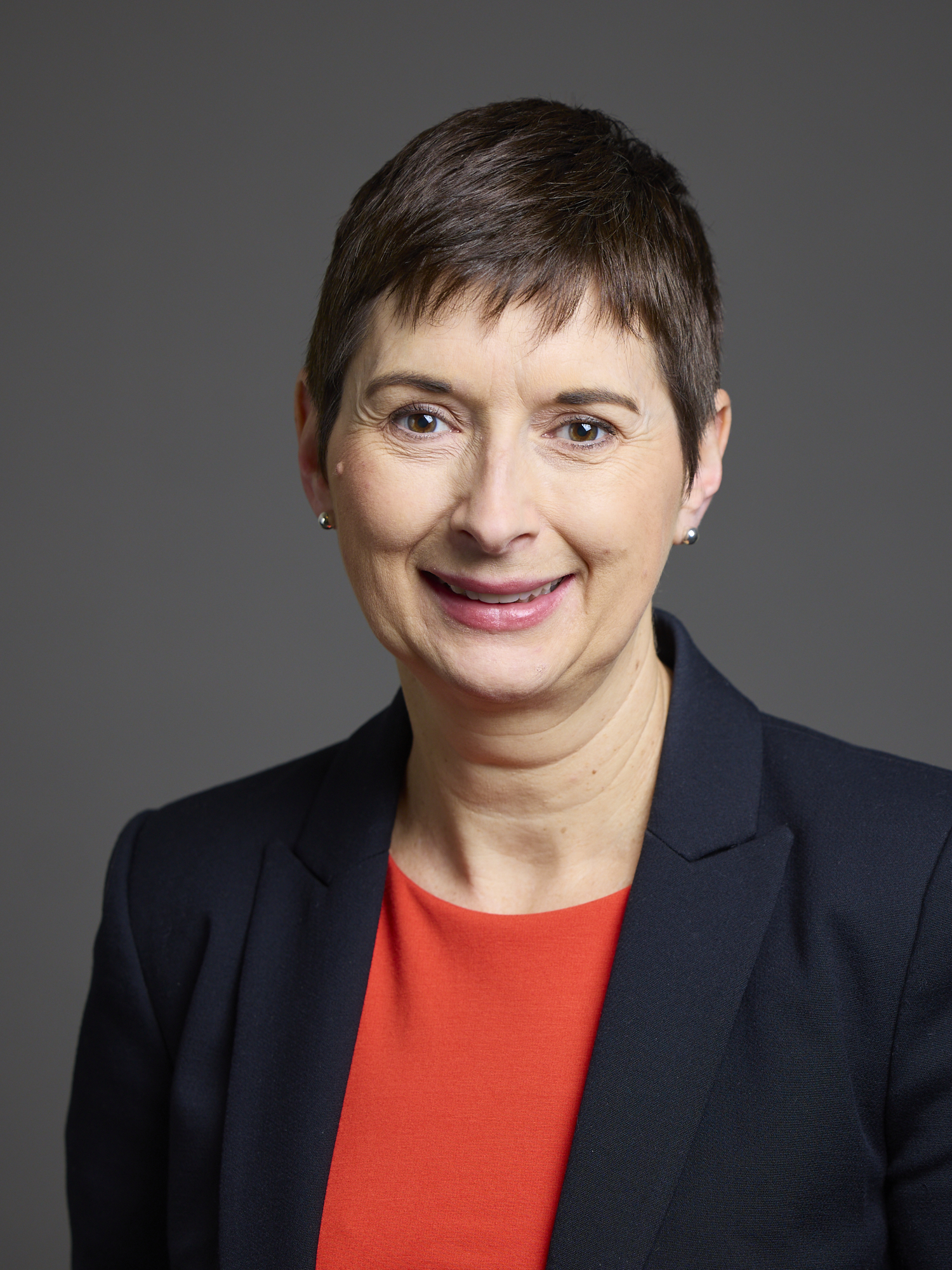
Baroness Caroline Pidgeon has been chair of the English Liberal Democrats since January 2025.

Chairs are elected in November and take office on 1 January the following year for a two-year term. They are eligible to stand for re-election, but must not serve as Chair for more than four years in a six-year period.

- Paul Farthing (c. 1994–1999)
- Dawn Davidson (c. 2000–2003)
- Stan Collins (2004–2006)
- Brian Orrell (2007–2009)
- Jonathan Davies (2010–2011)
- Peter Ellis (2012–2014)
- Steve Jarvis (2015–2016)
- Liz Leffman (2017–2018)
- Tahir Maher (2019)
- Gerald Vernon-Jackson (2020)
- Alison Rouse (December 2020 – July 2024)
- Lucas North (July 2024 - December 2024)
- Caroline Pidgeon (January 2025 – present)

== See also ==
- Liberal Democrats
- London Liberal Democrats
- Scottish Liberal Democrats
- Welsh Liberal Democrats
- Northern Ireland Liberal Democrats
