= List of Liberal Democrat MPs =

This is a list of Liberal Democrat MPs, past and present, elected to the House of Commons of the United Kingdom. Members of the European Parliament, the Scottish Parliament or the Senedd are not listed.

== List of MPs ==
List of Liberal Democrat MPs
| Name | Start | End | Constituency | Ref. |
|---|---|---|---|---|
| Danny Alexander | 2005 | 2015 | Inverness, Nairn, Badenoch and Strathspey | |
| Richard Allan | 1997 | 2005 | Sheffield Hallam | |
| Heidi Allen | 2019 (Note: Elected for the Conservative Party.) | 2019 | South Cambridgeshire | |
| David Alton | 1988 (Note: Formerly a Liberal Party MP.) | 1997 | Liverpool Mossley Hill | |
| Gideon Amos | 2024 | | Taunton and Wellington | |
| Steffan Aquarone | 2024 | | North Norfolk | |
| Paddy Ashdown | 1988 | 2001 | Yeovil | |
| Josh Babarinde | 2024 | | Eastbourne | |
| Norman Baker | 1997 | 2015 | Lewes | |
| Jackie Ballard | 1997 | 2001 | Taunton | |
| John Barrett | 1997 | 2010 | Edinburgh West | |
| Alan Beith | 1988 | 2015 | Berwick-upon-Tweed | |
| David Bellotti | 1990 | 1992 | Eastbourne | |
| Alison Bennett | 2024 | | Mid Sussex | |
| Luciana Berger | 2019 (Note: Elected for the Labour Party.) | 2019 | Liverpool Wavertree | |
| Gordon Birtwistle | 2010 | 2015 | Burnley | |
| Tom Brake | 1997 | 2019 | Carshalton and Wallington | |
| Peter Brand | 1997 | 2001 | Isle of Wight | |
| Colin Breed | 1997 | 2010 | South East Cornwall | |
| Alex Brewer | 2024 | | North East Hampshire | |
| Annette Brooke | 2001 | 2015 | Mid Dorset and North Poole | |
| Jess Brown-Fuller | 2024 | | Chichester | |
| Jeremy Browne | 2005 | 2015 | Taunton (Note: Between 2005 and 2010) | |
| Jeremy Browne | 2005 | 2015 | Taunton Deane (Note: Between 2010 and 2015) | |
| Malcolm Bruce | 1988 | 2015 | Gordon | |
| John Burnett | 1997 | 2005 | Torridge and West Devon | |
| Paul Burstow | 1997 | 2015 | Sutton and Cheam | |
| Lorely Burt | 2005 | 2015 | Solihull | |
| Vince Cable | 1997 | 2015 | Twickenham | |
| Vince Cable | 2017 | 2019 | Twickenham | |
| Patsy Calton | 2001 | 2005 | Cheadle | |
| Menzies Campbell | 1988 | 2015 | North East Fife | |
| Charlotte Cane | 2024 | | Ely and East Cambridgeshire | |
| Alex Carlile | 1988 | 1997 | Montgomeryshire | |
| Alistair Carmichael | 2001 | | Orkney and Shetland | |
| Michael Carr | 1991 | 1992 | Ribble Valley | |
| David Chadwick | 2024 | | Brecon, Radnor and Cwm Tawe | |
| Wendy Chamberlain | 2019 | | North East Fife | |
| Danny Chambers | 2024 | | Winchester | |
| David Chidgey | 1994 | 2005 | Eastleigh | |
| Nick Clegg | 2005 | 2017 | Sheffield Hallam | |
| Chris Coghlan | 2024 | | Dorking and Horley | |
| Victoria Collins | 2024 | | Harpenden and Berkhamsted | |
| Daisy Cooper | 2019 | | St Albans | |
| Brian Cotter | 1997 | 2005 | Weston-super-Mare | |
| Mike Crockart | 2010 | 2015 | Edinburgh West | |
| Adam Dance | 2024 | | Yeovil | |
| Steve Darling | 2024 | | Torbay | |
| Ed Davey | 1997 | 2015 | Kingston and Surbiton | |
| Ed Davey | 2017 | | Kingston and Surbiton | |
| Chris Davies | 1995 | 1997 | Littleborough and Saddleworth | |
| Bobby Dean | 2024 | | Carshalton and Wallington | |
| Lee Dillon | 2024 | | Newbury | |
| Jane Dodds | 2019 | 2019 | Brecon and Radnorshire | |
| Sue Doughty | 2001 | 2005 | Guildford | |
| Sarah Dyke | 2023 | | Somerton and Frome (Note: Between 2023 and 2024) | |
| Sarah Dyke | 2023 | | Glastonbury and Somerton (Note: Since 2024) | |
| Tim Farron | 2005 | | Westmorland and Lonsdale | |
| Ronnie Fearn | 1988 | 1992 | Southport | |
| Ronnie Fearn | 1997 | 2001 | Southport | |
| Lynne Featherstone | 2005 | 2015 | Hornsey and Wood Green | |
| Richard Foord | 2022 | | Tiverton and Honiton (Note: Between 2022 and 2024) | |
| Richard Foord | 2022 | | Honiton and Sidmouth (Note: Since 2024) | |
| Will Forster | 2024 | | Woking | |
| Don Foster | 1992 | 2015 | Bath | |
| Zöe Franklin | 2024 | | Guildford | |
| Andrew George | 1997 | 2015 | St Ives | |
| Andrew George | 2024 | | St Ives | |
| Sarah Gibson | 2024 | | Chippenham | |
| Sandra Gidley | 2000 | 2010 | Romsey | |
| Steve Gilbert | 2010 | 2015 | St Austell and Newquay | |
| Parmjit Singh Gill | 2004 | 2005 | Leicester South | |
| Rachel Gilmour | 2024 | | Tiverton and Minehead | |
| Olly Glover | 2024 | | Didcot and Wantage | |
| Marie Goldman | 2024 | | Chelmsford | |
| Julia Goldsworthy | 2005 | 2010 | Falmouth and Camborne | |
| Tom Gordon | 2024 | | Harrogate and Knaresborough | |
| Donald Gorrie | 1997 | 2001 | Edinburgh West | |
| Matthew Green | 2001 | 2005 | Ludlow | |
| Sarah Green | 2021 | | Chesham and Amersham | |
| Sam Gyimah | 2019 | 2019 | East Surrey | |
| Duncan Hames | 2010 | 2015 | Chippenham | |
| Mike Hancock | 1997 | 2014 | Portsmouth South | |
| Monica Harding | 2024 | | Esher and Walton | |
| Evan Harris | 1997 | 2010 | Oxford West and Abingdon | |
| Nick Harvey | 1992 | 2015 | North Devon | |
| David Heath | 1997 | 2015 | Somerton and Frome | |
| John Hemming | 2005 | 2015 | Birmingham Yardley | |
| Pippa Heylings | 2024 | | South Cambridgeshire | |
| Wera Hobhouse | 2017 | | Bath | |
| Paul Holmes | 2001 | 2010 | Chesterfield | |
| Martin Horwood | 2005 | 2015 | Cheltenham | |
| David Howarth | 2005 | 2010 | Cambridge | |
| Geraint Howells | 1988 | 1992 | Ceredigion and Pembroke North | |
| Simon Hughes | 1988 | 2015 | Southwark and Bermondsey (Note: Between 1988 and 1997) | |
| Simon Hughes | 1988 | 2015 | North Southwark and Bermondsey (Note: Between 1997 and 2010) | |
| Simon Hughes | 1988 | 2015 | Bermondsey and Old Southwark (Note: Between 2010 and 2015) | |
| Chris Huhne | 2005 | 2013 | Eastleigh | |
| Mark Hunter | 2005 | 2015 | Cheadle | |
| Julian Huppert | 2010 | 2015 | Cambridge | |
| Christine Jardine | 2017 | | Edinburgh West | |
| Liz Jarvis | 2024 | | Eastleigh | |
| Russell Johnston | 1988 | 1997 | Inverness, Nairn and Lochaber | |
| Clive Jones | 2024 | | Wokingham | |
| Nigel Jones | 1992 | 2005 | Cheltenham | |
| Paul Keetch | 1997 | 2010 | Hereford | |
| Charles Kennedy | 1988 (Note: Formerly a Social Democratic Party MP.) | 2015 | Ross, Cromarty and Skye (Note: Between 1988 and 1997) | |
| Charles Kennedy | 1988 | 2015 | Ross, Skye and Inverness West (Note: Between 1997 and 2005) | |
| Charles Kennedy | 1988 | 2015 | Ross, Skye and Lochaber (Note: Between 2005 and 2015) | |
| Archy Kirkwood | 1988 | 2005 | Roxburgh and Berwickshire | |
| Paul Kohler | 2024 | | Wimbledon | |
| Susan Kramer | 2005 | 2010 | Richmond Park | |
| Norman Lamb | 2001 | 2019 | North Norfolk | |
| David Laws | 2001 | 2015 | Yeovil | |
| Phillip Lee | 2019 | 2019 | Bracknell | |
| John Leech | 2005 | 2015 | Manchester Withington | |
| Richard Livsey | 1988 | 1992 | Brecon and Radnorshire | |
| Richard Livsey | 1997 | 2001 | Brecon and Radnorshire | |
| Stephen Lloyd | 2010 | 2015 | Eastbourne | |
| Stephen Lloyd | 2017 | 2018 | Eastbourne | |
| Stephen Lloyd | 2019 | 2019 | Eastbourne | |
| Liz Lynne | 1992 | 1997 | Rochdale | |
| James MacCleary | 2024 | | Lewes | |
| Angus MacDonald | 2024 | | Inverness, Skye and West Ross-shire | |
| Robert Maclennan | 1988 | 2001 | Caithness and Sutherland (Note: Between 1988 and 1997) | |
| Robert Maclennan | 1988 | 2001 | Caithness, Sutherland and Easter Ross (Note: Between 1997 and 2001) | |
| Diana Maddock | 1993 | 1997 | Christchurch | |
| Ben Maguire | 2024 | | North Cornwall | |
| Helen Maguire | 2024 | | Epsom and Ewell | |
| Paul Marsden | 2001 (Note: Elected for the Labour Party, and returned to Labour at the end of his term.) | 2005 | Shrewsbury and Atcham | |
| Mike Martin | 2024 | | Tunbridge Wells | |
| Brian Mathew | 2024 | | Melksham and Devizes | |
| Charlie Maynard | 2024 | | Witney | |
| Ray Michie | 1988 | 2001 | Argyll and Bute | |
| Calum Miller | 2024 | | Bicester and Woodstock | |
| John Milne | 2024 | | Horsham | |
| Michael Moore | 1997 | 2015 | Tweeddale, Ettrick and Lauderdale (Note: Between 1997 and 2005) | |
| Michael Moore | 1997 | 2015 | Berwickshire, Roxburgh and Selkirk (Note: Between 2005 and 2015) | |
| Layla Moran | 2017 | | Oxford West and Abingdon | |
| Edward Morello | 2024 | | West Dorset | |
| Helen Morgan | 2021 | | North Shropshire | |
| Tom Morrison | 2024 | | Cheadle | |
| Greg Mulholland | 2005 | 2017 | Leeds North West | |
| Greg Mulholland | 2010 | 2015 | Wells | |
| Tessa Munt | 2024 | | Wells and Mendip Hills | |
| Susan Murray | 2024 | | Mid Dunbartonshire | |
| Emma Nicholson | 1995 | 1997 | Torridge and West Devon | |
| Mark Oaten | 1997 | 2010 | Winchester | |
| Sarah Olney | 2016 | 2017 | Richmond Park | |
| Sarah Olney | 2019 | | Richmond Park | |
| Lembit Öpik | 1997 | 2010 | Montgomeryshire | |
| Manuela Perteghella | 2024 | | Stratford-on-Avon | |
| Al Pinkerton | 2024 | | Surrey Heath | |
| John Pugh | 2001 | 2017 | Southport | |
| Alan Reid | 2001 | 2015 | Argyll and Bute | |
| David Rendel | 1993 | 2005 | Newbury | |
| Willie Rennie | 2006 | 2010 | Dunfermline and West Fife | |
| Joshua Reynolds | 2024 | | Maidenhead | |
| Dan Rogerson | 2005 | 2015 | North Cornwall | |
| Ian Roome | 2024 | | North Devon | |
| Paul Rowen | 2005 | 2010 | Rochdale | |
| Bob Russell | 1997 | 2015 | Colchester | |
| Anna Sabine | 2024 | | Frome and East Somerset | |
| Antoinette Sandbach | 2019 | 2019 | Eddisbury | |
| Adrian Sanders | 1997 | 2015 | Torbay | |
| Roz Savage | 2024 | | South Cotswolds | |
| Vikki Slade | 2024 | | Mid Dorset and North Poole | |
| Lisa Smart | 2024 | | Hazel Grove | |
| Angela Smith | 2019 | 2019 | Penistone and Stocksbridge | |
| Cyril Smith | 1988 | 1992 | Rochdale | |
| Robert Smith | 1997 | 2015 | West Aberdeenshire and Kincardine | |
| Ian Sollom | 2024 | | St Neots and Mid Cambridgeshire | |
| David Steel | 1988 | 1997 | Tweeddale, Ettrick and Lauderdale | |
| Nicol Stephen | 1991 | 1992 | Kincardine and Deeside | |
| Jamie Stone | 2017 | | Caithness, Sutherland and Easter Ross | |
| Andrew Stunell | 1997 | 2015 | Hazel Grove | |
| Ian Swales | 2010 | 2015 | Redcar | |
| Jo Swinson | 2005 | 2015 | East Dunbartonshire | |
| Jo Swinson | 2017 | 2019 | East Dunbartonshire | |
| Luke Taylor | 2024 | | Sutton and Cheam | |
| Matthew Taylor | 1988 | 2010 | Truro (Note: Between 1988 and 1997) | |
| Matthew Taylor | 1988 | 2010 | Truro and St Austell (Note: Between 1997 and 2010) | |
| Sarah Teather | 2003 | 2015 | Brent East (Note: Between 2003 and 2010) | |
| Sarah Teather | 2003 | 2015 | Brent Central (Note: Between 2010 and 2015) | |
| Cameron Thomas | 2024 | | Tewkesbury | |
| Mike Thornton | 2013 | 2015 | Eastleigh | |
| Peter Thurnham | 1996 | 1997 | Bolton North East | |
| John Thurso | 2001 | 2015 | Caithness, Sutherland and Easter Ross | |
| Jenny Tonge | 1997 | 2005 | Richmond Park | |
| Paul Tyler | 1992 | 2005 | North Cornwall | |
| Chuka Umunna | 2019 | 2019 | Streatham | |
| Freddie van Mierlo | 2024 | | Henley and Thame | |
| Caroline Voaden | 2024 | | South Devon | |
| Jim Wallace | 1988 | 2001 | Orkney and Shetland | |
| David Ward | 2010 | 2015 | Bradford East | |
| Steve Webb | 1997 | 2015 | Northavon (Note: Between 1997 and 2010) | |
| Steve Webb | 1997 | 2015 | Thornbury and Yate (Note: Between 2010 and 2015) | |
| Max Wilkinson | 2024 | | Cheltenham | |
| Mark Williams | 2005 | 2017 | Ceredigion | |
| Roger Williams | 2001 | 2015 | Brecon and Radnorshire | |
| Stephen Williams | 2005 | 2015 | Bristol West | |
| Phil Willis | 1997 | 2010 | Harrogate and Knaresborough | |
| Jenny Willott | 2005 | 2015 | Cardiff Central | |
| Munira Wilson | 2019 | | Twickenham | |
| Sarah Wollaston | 2019 | 2019 | Totnes | |
| Simon Wright | 2010 | 2015 | Norwich South | |
| Martin Wrigley | 2024 | | Newton Abbot | |
| Claire Young | 2024 | | Thornbury and Yate | |
| Richard Younger-Ross | 2001 | 2010 | Teignbridge | |
