= Federal Board (Liberal Democrats) =

Governing body of the UK Liberal Democrats

- Abbreviation: FB
- Chair: Josh Babarinde MP
- Parent organisation: Liberal Democrats
- Website: Federal Board
- Formerly called: Federal Executive

The Federal Board is the governing body of the Liberal Democrats. It is chaired by the party president, currently Josh Babarinde, and includes members of the party-at-large elected every three years in an all-member ballot, as well as representatives from the state parties, MPs, peers, MEPs, and councillors. Until 2017 it was known as the Federal Executive. From November 2022, it was re-constituted, with a Federal Council added to provide scrutiny to a smaller sized board.

== History ==
In November 2015, the election of Lord Rennard by members of the House of Lords as the Peer Representative to the committee caused a "backlash" from party members, due to public accusations of sexual harassment that had been made against the peer. The complaints triggered a petition calling for a special conference to debate the issue, and resulted in Rennard stepping down from the body shortly afterwards.

In November 2016, reforms were passed that resulted in the Federal Executive being replaced by the Federal Board.

Following constitutional reforms ahead of the 2022 election, the number of directly elected members was reduced from 15, to 3. Following the 2022 election, Lucy Nethsinga came first out of the directly elected members, followed by Neil Fawcett and then Joyce Onstad. Following her resignation from the party, Onstad was replaced by Callum Robertson who won the recounted vote.

== Members of the Federal Board ==
- Party President: Josh Babarinde MP
- English Party Chair: Baroness Caroline Pidgeon
- Scottish Party Convenor: Jenni Laing
- Welsh Party Chair: Tim Sly
- Leader: Ed Davey MP
- Chair of FFRC and Registered Treasurer: Cllr Mike Cox
- Chair of FPDC: Claire Hudson
- Vice-chair of FPC: Helen Morgan MP
- Chair of FCC: Cllr Nick Da Costa
- Chair of FCEC: Lord Mark Pack
- Vice-president: Victoria Collins MP
- Councillor representative: Cllr Lucy Nethsingha (St Neots and Mid Cambridgeshire)
- Chair of the Young Liberals: Will Tennison

Directly Elected:

- Cllr Hannah Kitching (Barnsley)
- Janey Little (Didcot and Wantage)
- Cllr Prue Bray (Wokingham)

Non-voting Members

- Chief Executive: Mike Dixon

== Federal Council ==
The Federal Council was formed following the reduction of the size of the Federal Board in 2022. According to the Liberal Democrats, the Federal Council scrutinises the actions of the Federal Board

=== Federal Council seat allocation ===
As of 2024, membership of the Federal Council is allocated as such:

- 21 party members (elected by party members)
- 3 members from each State Party (elected according to each State Party's processes)
- 3 principal local authority councillors, elected Mayors or Police and Crime Commissioners (elected by their numbers)
- 3 members of the Young Liberals, (elected according to the Young Liberals processes)
- 3 representatives of the Parliamentary Liberal Democrats
- The Chair of the Federal Audit and Scrutiny Committee

=== Members of the Federal Council ===
The current members of the Federal Council are

- Chair of Federal Council: Cllr Tim Pickstone
- Vice Chairs of Federal Council: Caron Lindsay and Cllr Victor Chamberlain
- FASC Chair: Dr David Radcliffe

Directly elected party members:

- Adrian Hyyrylainen-Trett
- Cllr Aiden Van de Weyer
- April Preston
- Candy Piercy
- Cllr Caroline Leaver
- Caron Lindsay
- Charley Hasted
- Dominic Martin
- Cllr Donna Harris
- Cllr Gareth Roberts
- Cllr Hannah Perkin
- Humaira Sanders
- Janice Turner
- Jenny Wilkinson
- Keith Moffit
- Rachel Barker
- Richard Cole
- Sarah Cheung Johnson
- Cllr Simon McGrath
- Teresa Cooper
- Cllr Victor Chamberlain

State party representatives:

- Edward Sainsbury
- Matt McLaren
- Toby Keynes
- Christine McMurdoch
- Fraser Graham
- Stephen Harte
- Anne Williams
- Claire Waller
- Jon Burree

Parliamentary representatives:

- Daisy Cooper MP
- Wendy Chamberlain MP
- TBC

Council representatives:

- Cllr Sudhakar Achwal
- Cllr Thalia Marrington
- Cllr Tim Pickstone

Young Liberals representatives:

- Abrial Jerram
- Harvey Jones
- Harvey Thomas-Benton

== See also ==
- National Executive Committee of the Labour Party (UK)
- Conservative Party Board
