= English Council =

The term English council could refer to:

- The governing body of the English Liberal Democrats
- The Mayoral Council for England, a regional mayors' forum in England
- Local government in England
