= President of the Liberal Democrats =

UK party leader

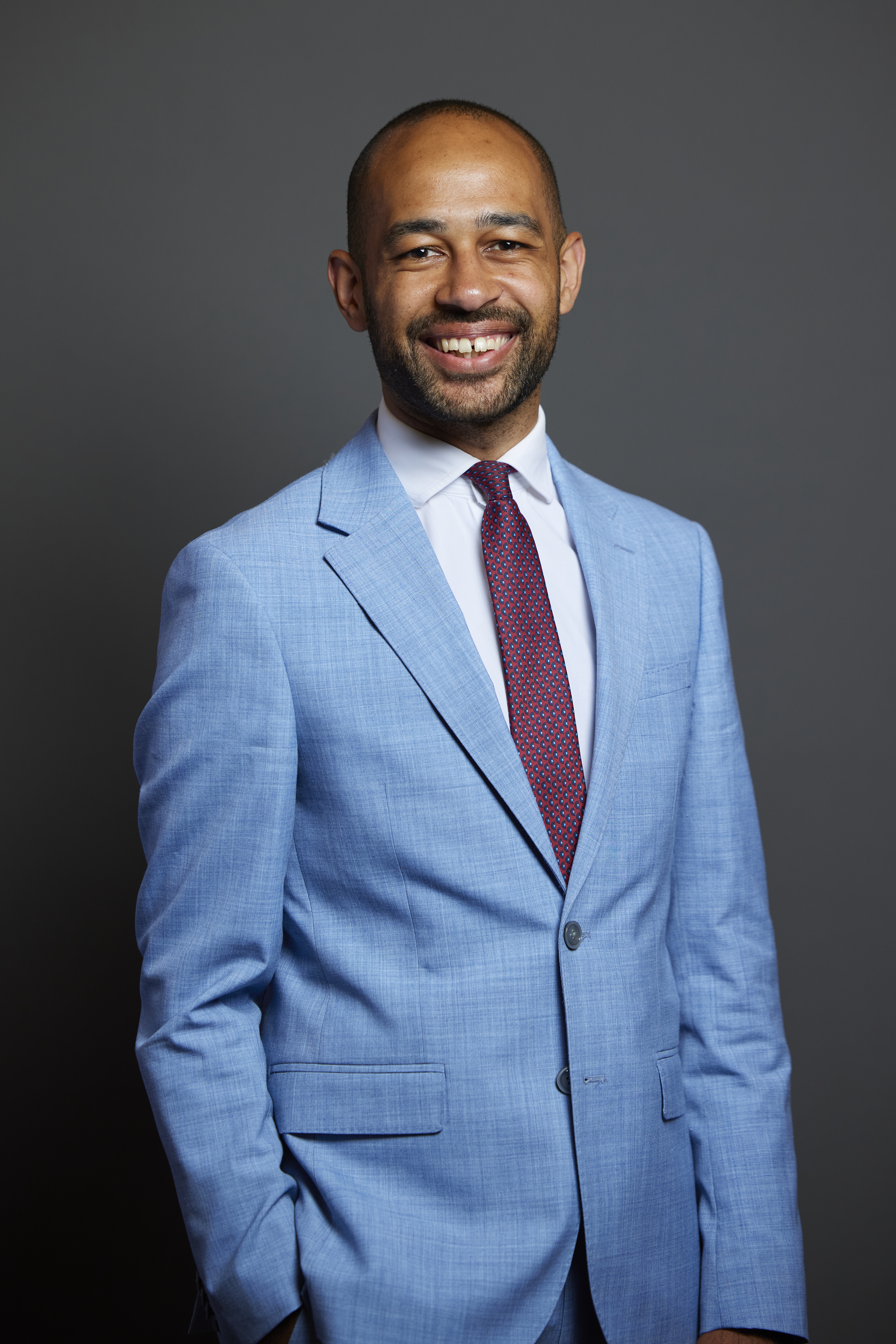
- Incumbent; Josh Babarinde since 1 January 2026
- Member of: Federal Board
- Reports to: Liberal Democrats
- Appointer: Liberal Democrats
- Term length: 3 Years; Renewable once
- Formation: 1988
- First holder: Ian Wrigglesworth
- Deputy: Vice President of the Liberal Democrats

The president of the Liberal Democrats chairs the Federal Board of the Liberal Democrats in the United Kingdom.

According to the Liberal Democrat constitution, the president is the principal public representative of the Party and chairs the Federal Board. The role is elected by the membership for a fixed term of three years. They may serve a maximum of two terms. The next scheduled contest will occur in Autumn 2028 with the winner beginning their term of office on 1 January 2029. The election is conducted using the single transferable vote.

In the event of the Leader resigning prior to the end of their term, the Deputy Leader and President take on the role of joint Acting Leaders. This last occurred following the resignation of Jo Swinson after she lost her seat in the 2019 General Election; Ed Davey MP and Mark Pack took on the role until the culmination of the subsequent leadership election.

The current president is Josh Babarinde, who took office on 1 January 2026, replacing The Lord Pack, who had held the office from 1 January 2020 to 31 December 2025.

== Eligibility to stand ==
In order to be a candidate for president, the candidate must be a member of the Liberal Democrats and secure the nomination of not less than 200 members in not less than 20 local parties (including, for this purpose, the specified associated organisations representing youth or students).

== List of party presidents to date ==
Member of the House of Commons
Member of the House of Lords
Non-parliamentarian

President	Term of Office		Term Length	Elections	Leader
Ian Wrigglesworth	1 January 1989	31 December 1990	2 years	—	Paddy Ashdown
Charles Kennedy; MP for Ross, Cromarty and Skye	1 January 1991	31 December 1994	4 years	1992	Paddy Ashdown
Bob Maclennan; MP for Caithness, Sutherland and Easter Ross	1 January 1995	31 December 1998	4 years	1997	Paddy Ashdown
Diana Maddock; Baroness Maddock	1 January 1999	31 December 2000	2 years	—	Paddy Ashdown
Diana Maddock; Baroness Maddock	1 January 1999	31 December 2000	2 years	—	Charles Kennedy
Navnit Dholakia; Baron Dholakia	1 January 2001	31 December 2004	4 years	2001	Charles Kennedy
Simon Hughes; MP for North Southwark and Bermondsey	1 January 2005	31 December 2008	4 years	2005	Charles Kennedy
Simon Hughes; MP for North Southwark and Bermondsey	1 January 2005	31 December 2008	4 years	2005	Menzies Campbell
Simon Hughes; MP for North Southwark and Bermondsey	1 January 2005	31 December 2008	4 years	2005	Nick Clegg
Rosalind Scott; Baroness Scott of Needham Market	1 January 2009	31 December 2010	2 years	2010	Nick Clegg
Tim Farron; MP for Westmorland and Lonsdale	1 January 2011	31 December 2014	4 years	—	Nick Clegg
Sal Brinton; Baroness Brinton	1 January 2015	1 January 2020	5 years	2015; 2017; 2019	Nick Clegg
Sal Brinton; Baroness Brinton	1 January 2015	1 January 2020	5 years	2015; 2017; 2019	Tim Farron
Sal Brinton; Baroness Brinton	1 January 2015	1 January 2020	5 years	2015; 2017; 2019	Vince Cable
Sal Brinton; Baroness Brinton	1 January 2015	1 January 2020	5 years	2015; 2017; 2019	Jo Swinson
Mark Pack; Baron Pack (Note: Non-parliamentarian until appointed to the Lords in 2025.)	1 January 2020	1 January 2026	6 years	2024	Ed Davey
Josh Babarinde; MP for Eastbourne	1 January 2026	Incumbent	10 months and 14 days	—	Ed Davey

== Election results ==
=== Elections in the 2020s ===
==== 2025 ====
Candidate	First Round	
Candidate	Votes	%
Josh Babarinde	3,742	68.79%
Prue Bray	1,698	31.21%
Turnout/Total	5,440	9.1%

==== 2022 ====
Mark Pack was re-elected president of the Liberal Democrats.

Candidate	First round	
Candidate	Votes	%
Mark Pack	4,968	54.5%
Lucy Nethsingha	2,194	24.2%
Liz Webster	1,936	21.3%
Turnout/Total	9,099	14.05%

=== Elections in the 2010s ===
==== 2019 ====
Mark Pack was elected president of the Liberal Democrats.

Candidate	First round	
Candidate	Votes	%
Mark Pack	14,381	58.6%
Christine Jardine	10,164	41.4%
Turnout/Total	24,545	23.1%

==== 2016 ====
Sal Brinton was returned unopposed.

==== 2014 ====
Candidate	First round				
Candidate	Votes	%	Transfers	Votes	%
Sal Brinton	7,865	46.86	+2,323	10,188	62.40
Daisy Cooper	4,530	26.98	+1,608	6,138	37.59
Liz Lynne	4,389	26.14			
Turnout/Total	16,784	38.9			

There were 25 spoilt/rejected ballots.

==== 2012 ====
Tim Farron was returned unopposed.

==== 2010 ====
Candidate	First round	
Candidate	Votes	%
Tim Farron	14,593	52.98
Susan Kramer	12,950	47.01
Turnout/Total	27,543	41.9

There were 64 spoilt/rejected ballots.

=== Elections in the 2000s ===
==== 2008 ====
Candidate	First round	
Candidate	Votes	%
Ros Scott	20,736	72.04
Lembit Öpik	6,247	21.70
Chandila Fernando	1,799	6.25
Turnout/Total	28,782	47.8

There were 49 spoilt/rejected ballots.

==== 2006 ====
Simon Hughes was returned unopposed.

==== 2004 ====
Candidate	First round	
Candidate	Votes	%
Simon Hughes	24,333	70.86
Lembit Öpik	10,002	29.13
Turnout/Total	34,335	29.13

There were 144 spoilt/rejected ballots.

==== 2002 ====
Navnit Dholakia was returned unopposed.

==== 2000 ====
Navnit Dholakia was returned unopposed.

=== Elections in the 1990s ===
==== 1998 ====
Diana Maddock was returned unopposed.

==== 1996 ====
Bob Maclennan was returned unopposed.

==== 1994 ====
Candidate	First round	
Candidate	Votes	%
Bob Maclennan	18,080	53.77
Don Foster	8,979	26.61
Martin Thomas	6,561	19.51
Turnout/Total	33,620	33.4

There were 114 spoilt/rejected ballots.

==== 1992 ====
Candidate	First round	
Candidate	Votes	%
Charles Kennedy	25,956	70.45
Martin Thomas	10,813	29.35
Turnout/Total	36,840	36.2

There were 71 spoilt/rejected ballots.

==== 1990 ====
Candidate	First round	
Candidate	Votes	%
Charles Kennedy	24,648	84.24
Tim Clement-Jones	4,818	16.11
Brian Grocott	436	1.45
Turnout/Total	29,902	36.3

There were 55 spoilt/rejected ballots.

=== Elections in the 1980s ===
==== 1988 ====
Candidate	First round	
Candidate	Votes	%
Ian Wrigglesworth	28,638	50.22
Des Wilson	21,906	38.41
Gwynoro Jones	6,479	11.36
Turnout/Total	57,023	71.2

There were 448 spoilt/rejected ballots.

== See also ==
- Leader of the Liberal Democrats
- Deputy leader of the Liberal Democrats

== Notes and references ==
Notes
