= Navnit Dholakia, Baron Dholakia =

British Liberal Democrat politician (born 1937)

The Right Honourable The Lord Dholakia OBE PC JP DL
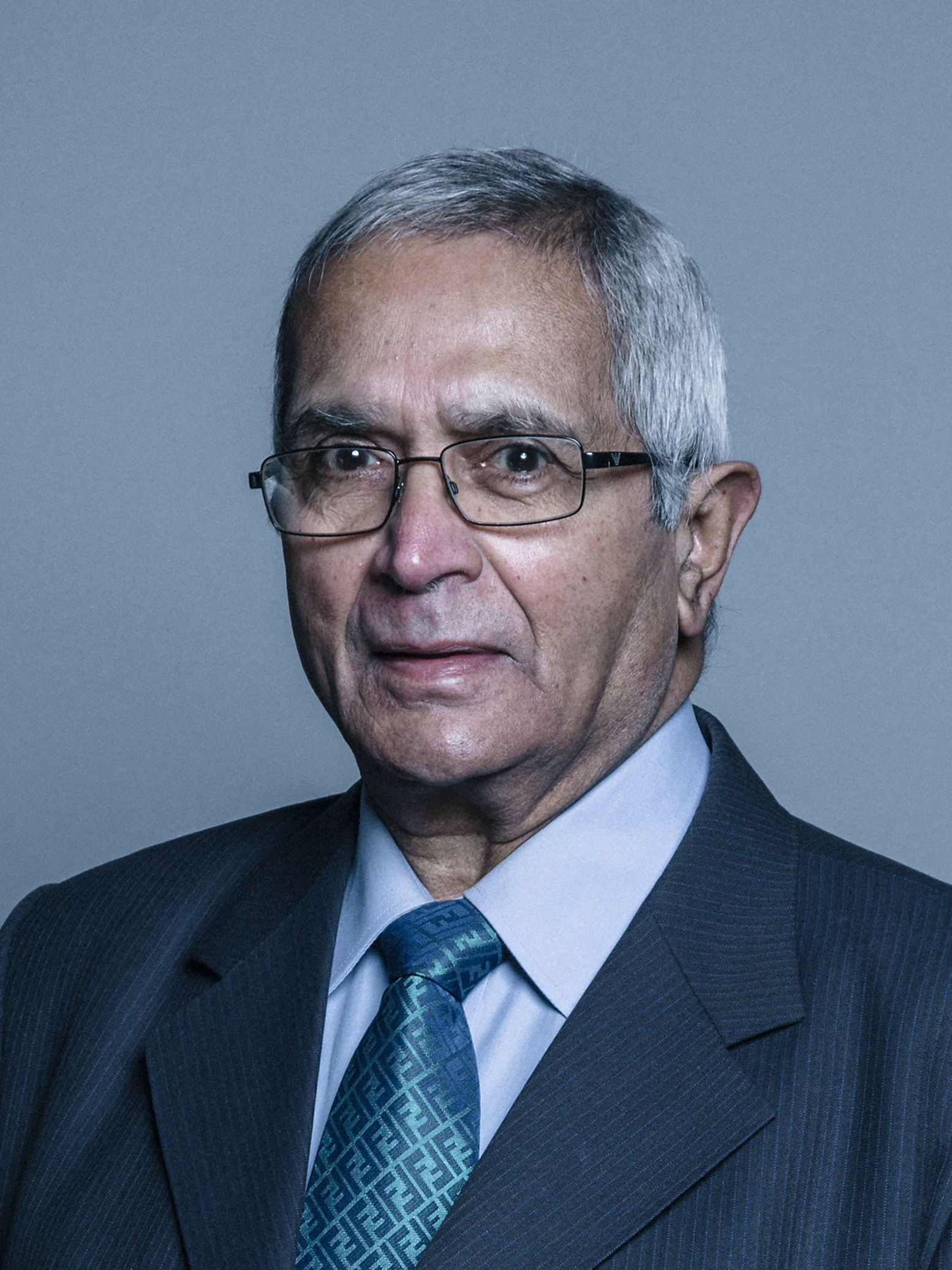
- Official portrait, 2018

Co-Deputy Leader of the Liberal Democrats in the House of Lords
- In office 24 November 2004 – 7 October 2024 Serving with: The Lord Wallace of Saltaire (2004–2010); The Baroness Walmsley (2017–2024)
- Leader: The Lord McNally; The Lord Wallace of Tankerness; The Lord Newby

President of the Liberal Democrats
- In office 1 January 2001 – 31 December 2004
- Leader: Charles Kennedy
- Preceded by: Diana Maddock
- Succeeded by: Simon Hughes

Member of the House of Lords
- Lord Temporal
- Life peerage 24 October 1997

Personal details
- Born: 4 March 1937 (age 89) Tanzania
- Party: Liberal Democrats
- Spouse: Ann McLuskie (m. 1967)
- Children: 2

Navnit Dholakia, Baron Dholakia, OBE, PC, JP, DL (born 4 March 1937), is a British Liberal Democrat politician and was a deputy leader of the Liberal Democrats in the House of Lords between 2004 and 2024.

== Education ==
Navnit Dholakia was born in Tanzania on 4 March 1937 to Permananddas Mulji Dholakia and Shantabai Permananddas Dholakia. He was educated in Tanzania and India, studying at the Home School and Institute of Science in Bhavnagar, Gujarat. Dholakia came to Britain to study at Brighton Technical College, taking his first job as a medical laboratory technician at Southlands Hospital in Shoreham-by-Sea.

== Political career ==
He became active in the Liberal party and was elected to Brighton Borough Council between 1961 and 1964.

From 1976 he served as member of the Commission for Racial Equality and has been involved in the Sussex Police Authority, Police Complaints Authority and Howard League for Penal Reform. He is the current chair of Nacro, and also chairs its Race Issues Advisory Committee.

Dholakia was created a life peer as Baron Dholakia, of Waltham Brooks in the County of West Sussex, on 24 October 1997, and sits on the Liberal Democrat benches in the House of Lords.

From 1997 to 2002 he served as a Liberal Democrat whip in the House, and from 2002 to 2004 he was the Home Affairs Spokesman.

He was elected President of the Liberal Democrats at the end of 1999 and served in the post from 2000 to 2004. In November 2004 he was elected a joint deputy leader of the Liberal Democrats in the House of Lords, and became the party's sole deputy leader in the Lords in 2010, before serving as join deputy leader again between 2017 and 2024.

Dholakia is involved with a range of charities including being a Patron of the British branch of Child In Need India (CINI UK).

== Honours ==
In the 1994 New Year Honours, Dholakia was made an Officer of the Order of the British Empire (OBE) for services to race relations. In 2000 he was named "Asian of the Year", and won the Pride of India Award in 2005. In November 2009 he was given an honorary doctorate from the University of Hertfordshire. He was a deputy lieutenant (DL) in the county of West Sussex from 1999 to 2012.

Dholakia was appointed to the Privy Council (PC) in December 2010.

Government of India conferred Pravasi Bharatiya Samman Dholakia in 2003.

Coat of arms of Navnit Dholakia, Baron Dholakia
Crest Sejant affronty upon a cushion Argent a representation of Ganesh Argent tusked vested bejewelled and crowned with a Hindu crown holding in each of the upper hands a baton and in the lower sinister a sweetmeat Or charged on the abdomen with a Hindu symbol and the sinister leg fesswise above a rat couchant Sable. Escutcheon Per fess wavy Or and Sable two heraldic dolphins naiant counterchanged that in base contourny a border Sable in chief and Argent in base nine martlets counterchanged. Supporters Two blackbuck reguardant Proper gorged with a plain collar armed and unguled Or. Motto Carpe Diem

== Personal life ==
He has been married to Lady Dholakia, née Ann McLuskie, since 1967. They have two daughters and live in West Sussex. He is a Hindu of Gujarati origin.

== Sources ==
- Lord Dholakia biography at the site of Liberal Democrats

Party political offices
Preceded by Diana Maddock	President of the Liberal Democrats; 2000–2004	Succeeded by Simon Hughes
Orders of precedence in the United Kingdom
Preceded by The Lord Brooke of Alverthorpe	Gentlemen; Baron Dholakia	Followed by The Lord Puttnam
