= Sal Brinton =

British politician (born 1955)

The Right Honourable The Baroness Brinton
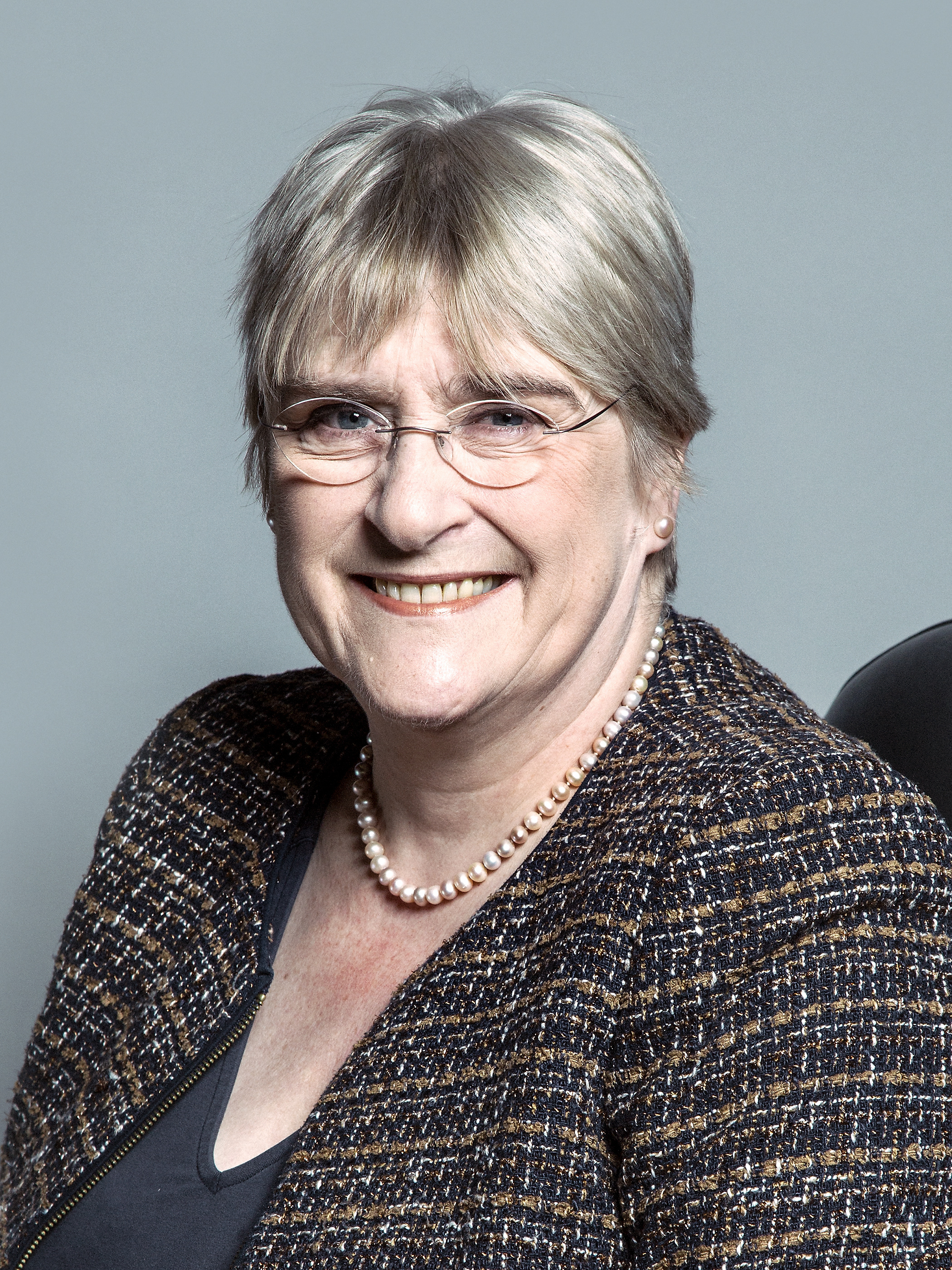
- Official portrait, 2018

Leader of the Liberal Democrats
- Acting; 13 December 2019 – 1 January 2020 Serving with Ed Davey
- Deputy: Ed Davey
- Preceded by: Jo Swinson
- Succeeded by: Ed Davey & Mark Pack (acting)
- De facto 8 May 2015 – 16 July 2015
- Preceded by: Nick Clegg
- Succeeded by: Tim Farron

President of the Liberal Democrats
- In office 1 January 2015 – 1 January 2020
- Vice President: Isabelle Parasram (2019)
- Leader: Nick Clegg; Tim Farron; Vince Cable; Jo Swinson; Ed Davey · Herself
- Preceded by: Tim Farron
- Succeeded by: Mark Pack

Member of the House of Lords
- Lord Temporal
- Life peerage 4 February 2011

Lib Dem Group Leader on Cambridgeshire County Council
- In office 8 May 1997 – 30 September 2004
- Deputy: Sheila Friend-Smith (1997–2001); Maurice Leeke (2001–2003); Julian Huppert (2003–04)
- Preceded by: Maurice Leeke
- Succeeded by: Julian Huppert

Cambridgeshire County Councillor for Castle
- In office 6 May 1993 – 29 October 2004
- Preceded by: J Mitten
- Succeeded by: John White

Personal details
- Born: Sarah Virginia Brinton; 1 April 1955 (age 71) Paddington, London, England
- Party: Liberal Democrats (1988–present)
- Other political affiliations: Liberal (1975–1988)
- Parent: Tim Brinton (father)
- Relatives: Mary Stocks, Baroness Stocks (cousin)
- Education: Central School of Speech and Drama; Churchill College, Cambridge

Sarah Virginia Brinton, Baroness Brinton (born 1 April 1955), known as Sal Brinton, is a British politician who served as president of the Liberal Democrats from 2015 to 2020. In November 2010 she was nominated to the House of Lords, taking her place on 10 February 2011 having been created Baroness Brinton, of Kenardington in the County of Kent on 4 February. After Jo Swinson lost her seat at the 2019 general election, Brinton and Sir Ed Davey became acting co-leaders of the Liberal Democrats. After Brinton's term as party president ended, her successor Mark Pack also succeeded her as acting co-leader with Davey. Davey was elected as permanent leader of the party in 2020.

== Early life and education ==
Brinton was born in Paddington, London, in 1955. She is the daughter of former Conservative MP Tim Brinton, and the cousin of Mary Stocks, Baroness Stocks.

Brinton was educated at Benenden School and studied stage management at the Central School of Speech and Drama. She subsequently completed a degree in English literature at Churchill College, Cambridge, in 1981.

== Career ==
Beginning her career in the mid-1970s at the BBC as a television floor manager, working on Playschool, Grandstand, Doctor Who, and other programmes, Brinton joined the Liberal Party in 1975 and became a Cambridgeshire County Councillor in 1993. She contested the parliamentary seat of South East Cambridgeshire at the 1997 and 2001 general elections.

Brinton served as bursar of Lucy Cavendish College, Cambridge, from 1992 to 1997, and Selwyn College, Cambridge, from 1997 to 2002. In 1997 she won the East Anglian entrepreneurial businesswoman of the year award. She was also founder member of the Board of the East of England Development Agency from December 1998 to December 2004 (Deputy Chair from 2001 to 2004).

From 1999 to 2004, Brinton chaired the Cambridgeshire Learning and Skills Council. She contested the Watford constituency at the 2005 general election, coming second to incumbent Labour MP Claire Ward. She stood at Watford at the next election in 2010, this time coming second behind Conservative candidate Richard Harrington and reducing Ward to a third-place finish. She is a non-executive director of the Ufi Charitable Trust, a charity giving grants in the vocational educational technology sector.

Brinton is a member of the Liberal Democrat Federal Policy Committee and Vice Chair of the Federal Conference Committee. She also chairs the Liberal Democrat Diversity Engagement Group, with a particular interest in increasing the number of women, black, Asian, and minority ethnic MPs. Baroness Brinton was a member of the All Party Stalking Inquiry of 2011.

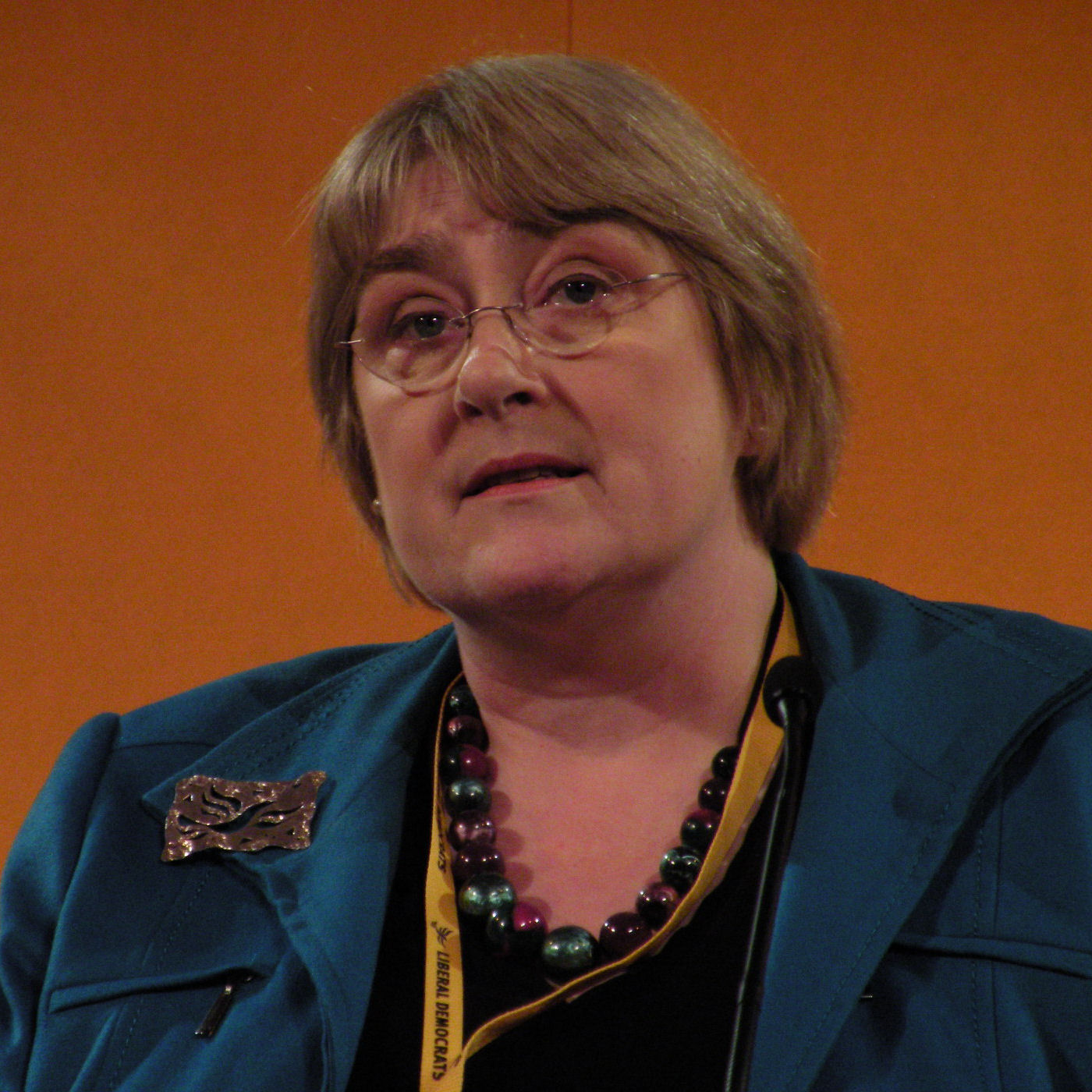
Brinton in 2013

In 2014, Brinton was elected as the president of the Liberal Democrats, defeating Daisy Cooper and Liz Lynne, and took up her position on 1 January 2015.

== Personal life ==
Brinton has rheumatoid arthritis and so usually uses a wheelchair. She met her husband Tim when she worked at the BBC. They live together with their family in Watford.

== Honours ==
In 2003, Brinton was awarded an honorary PhD for her contribution to education, skills and learning by Anglia Ruskin University. In November 2013, she was made a Fellow of Birkbeck, University of London. She is Patron of Christian Blind Mission UK, Trustee of the United Kingdom Committee of UNICEF, a Trustee of the Ufi Charitable Trust, and a Director of the Joseph Rowntree Reform Trust Ltd.

Coat of arms of Sal Brinton
Escutcheon Per pale Argent and Gules a lion salient double queued between three annulets counterchanged. Supporters Dexter a British WW1 fighter pilot vested Proper; sinister an archer bearded Proper vested Vert collared Argent cuffed and belted Or the crossbelt Sable buckled Argent booted and holding in the sinister hand a longbow Proper wearing a hat Vert attached thereto two plumes Argent. Motto Lex Et Salus (Law & Health)

Party political offices
Preceded by Tim Farron	President of the Liberal Democrats; 2015–2019	Succeeded by Mark Pack
