= Mark Pack, Baron Pack =

Liberal Democrat life peer

The Right Honourable The Lord Pack
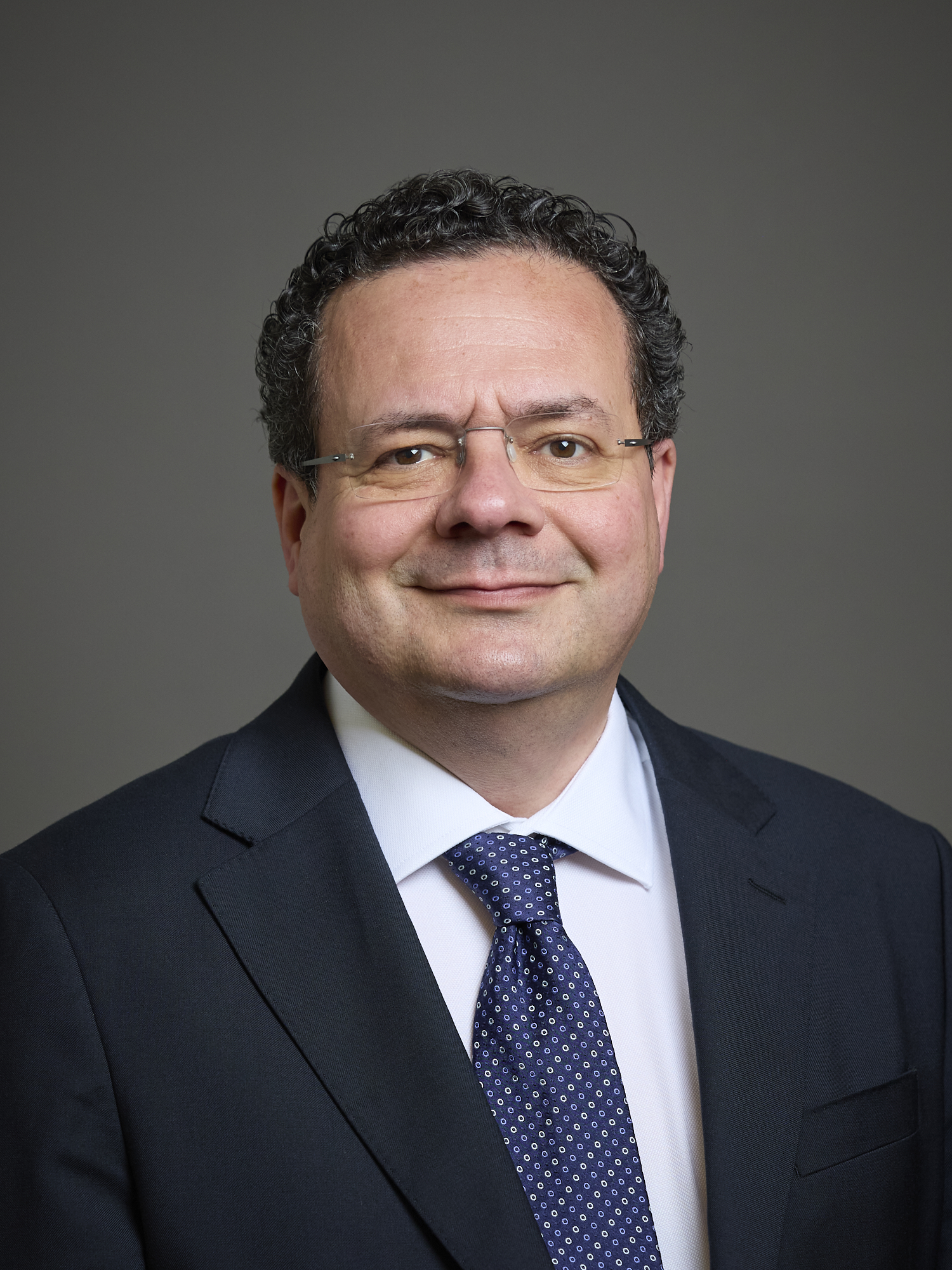
- Official portrait, 2025

President of the Liberal Democrats
- In office 1 January 2020 – 1 January 2026
- Vice President: Isabelle Parasram; Amna Ahmad
- Leader: Ed Davey & himself (acting); Ed Davey
- Preceded by: Sal Brinton
- Succeeded by: Josh Babarinde

Liberal Democrat Spokesperson for the Cabinet Office in the House of Lords
- Incumbent
- Assumed office 13 May 2026
- Leader: Ed Davey

Member of the House of Lords
- Lord Temporal
- Life peerage 29 January 2025

Leader of the Liberal Democrats
- Acting; 1 January 2020 – 27 August 2020 Serving with Ed Davey
- Deputy: Ed Davey
- Preceded by: Ed Davey & Sal Brinton (acting)
- Succeeded by: Ed Davey

Personal details
- Born: Mark Anthony Pack; 27 July 1970 (age 56)
- Citizenship: British
- Party: Liberal Democrats
- Education: University of York (BA, PhD)
- Website: www.markpack.org.uk

Mark Anthony Pack, Baron Pack (born 27 July 1970) is a British politician who served as the president of the Liberal Democrats from 1 January 2020 until 31 December 2025. After the party's leader, Jo Swinson, lost her seat in the 2019 December election, Pack served as acting leader alongside Ed Davey from 1 January 2020 to 27 August 2020, when Davey was elected as leader.

== Education ==
Pack read History and Economics at the University of York from 1988 to 1991. He then undertook a PhD in history, studying nineteenth-century elections, initially at the University of Exeter, before transferring back to the University of York to complete it, in 1994.

== Career ==
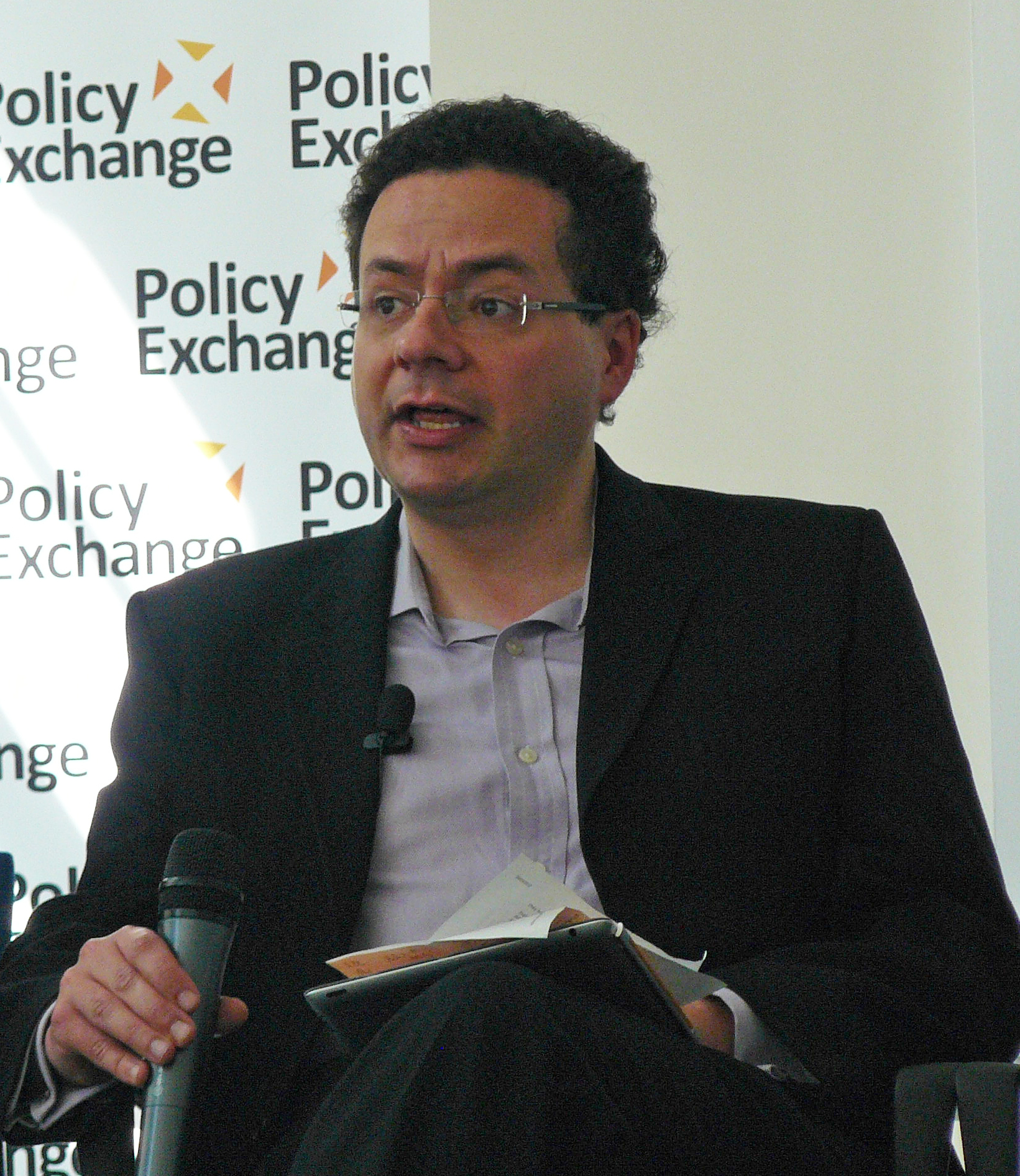
Pack in 2012

Pack worked as an IT administrator, before working for the Liberal Democrats from 2000 to 2009. He then worked in communications consultancy for MHP Communications, and then Teneo (at the time under the Blue Rubicon brand), from 2009 to 2019.

Pack was on the editorial board for the Journal of Liberal History. He was a visiting lecturer at City University.

While working for the Liberal Democrats, Pack was Head of Innovations, running the party's 2001 and 2005 Internet general election campaigns. He was the Campaign Manager for the Hornsey & Wood Green constituency from 1998 to 2005. Pack is a long-time Liberal Democrat blogger. He was co-editor of the blog Liberal Democrat Voice until 2013. Since 2011, he has edited Liberal Democrat Newswire, his monthly email newsletter about the party.

Pack stood to be the president of the Liberal Democrats in 2019, with his candidacy supported by MPs Layla Moran and Tom Brake, and MEP Catherine Bearder among others. The only other candidate was MP Christine Jardine. Pack was elected by 14,381 (58.6%) to 10,164 votes (41.4%) and began his term on 1 January 2020. As Jo Swinson, previously the leader of the party, had lost her seat in the December general election, the deputy leader Ed Davey and the party president acted as co-leaders until a new permanent leader could be elected. Pack thus assumed the acting co-leader role on starting his presidential term on 1 January 2020. After being reelected as president once, he stood down from office at the end of 2025.

Pack ranked 5 out of 50 on the Top 50 Influential Lib Dems of 2020 list.

Pack was announced to be appointed to the House of Lords as a Liberal Democrat life peer on 20 December 2024 as part of the 2024 Political Peerages. He was created Baron Pack, of Crouch Hill in the London Borough of Islington on 29 January 2025.

Pack writes frequently about political opinion polls, their uses and abuses, publishing a book on this subject in 2022. He maintains a database of national voting intention opinion polls, going back to 1943, which he believes to be the largest such dataset. This includes an increasing range of party leader and government ratings from other years, including back to the October 1938 Gallup question asking about satisfaction with Neville Chamberlain.

== Bibliography ==
=== Books ===
- 101 Ways To Win An Election, with Edward Maxfield (2012)
- Bad News: What the Headlines Don't Tell Us (2020)
- Polling Unpacked: The History, Uses and Abuses of Political Opinion Polls (2022)

=== Journal articles ===
- With Darren Lilleker and Nigel Jackson, "Political Parties and Web 2.0: The Liberal Democrat Perspective", Politics, Volume 30(2), 2010, p. 105-112. doi:10.1111/j.1467-9256.2010.01373.x
- "Obama: The marketing lessons", Journal of Direct, Data and Marketing Practice, Volume 12(1), 2010, p. 2-9. doi:10.1057/dddmp.2010.17
- "The Victory Lab: Full of secrets, but can they swing an election?", Journal of Direct, Data and Marketing Practice, Volume 14(4), 2013, p. 3490353. doi:10.1057/dddmp.2013.17

Party political offices
Preceded by Sal Brinton	President of the Liberal Democrats; 2020–2026	Succeeded by Josh Babarinde
