= Luke Taylor (politician) =

British politician

Luke Taylor MP
- Official portrait, 2026

Member of Parliament for Sutton and Cheam
- Incumbent
- Assumed office 4 July 2024
- Preceded by: Paul Scully
- Majority: 3,801 (8.0%)

Liberal Democrat Spokesperson for London
- Incumbent
- Assumed office 18 September 2024
- Leader: Ed Davey

Member of Sutton London Borough Council for Sutton West and East Cheam
- In office 9 May 2022 – 7 May 2026
- Preceded by: Ward established

Personal details
- Born: Luke Alexander Taylor Lincolnshire, England
- Party: Liberal Democrats
- Education: Imperial College London
- Website: luketaylor.org.uk

Luke Alexander Taylor is a British politician. A member of the Liberal Democrats, he has served as Member of Parliament (MP) for Sutton and Cheam since 2024. He was a Liberal Democrat councillor on Sutton London Borough Council for Sutton West and East Cheam between 2022 and 2026.

Taylor currently sits on the Liberal Democrat frontbench team as the Spokesperson for London.

== Early life and education ==
Taylor grew up in rural Lincolnshire. His parents were both teachers, and his father, Neil Taylor, was a Liberal Democrat councillor in West Lindsey in Lincolnshire, and a parliamentary candidate for Gainsborough and Horncastle in the 1992 United Kingdom general election, for Gainsborough in the 1997 United Kingdom general election, and for Bassetlaw in the 2001 United Kingdom general election.

Taylor was educated at De Aston School in Market Rasen, with fellow MP Robbie Moore, and later graduated with a Master of Engineering in Aeronautical Engineering from Imperial College London in 2008.

Prior to entering Parliament, Taylor worked at Ricondo (Aviation Consulting), a position he left shortly after his election.

== Political career ==
Taylor was selected as the Liberal Democrat candidate for Sutton and Cheam six weeks before the 2024 General Election, following the deselection of previous Liberal Democrat Candidate David Campanale.

The Liberal Democrat party subsequently admitted claims of religious discrimination in the deselection, detailed as direct and indirect discrimination on grounds of religion or belief under the Equality Act 2010, and also their failure to deal with complaints Campanale made. As of August 2026, the Central London County Court is deciding on the remedy and damages payable to Campanale. The Church Times reported that Taylor was named in the legal claim for having helped to lead the deselection campaign.

Taylor was elected as the MP for Sutton and Cheam on 4 July 2024 at the 2024 General Election, winning with a majority of 3,801 votes (36.9%) and overturning a substantial Conservative margin.

Since September 2024, he has served as the Liberal Democrat Spokesperson for London. He holds a seat on the Public Administration and Constitutional Affairs Committee, which he joined in October 2024.

Taylor serves as Chair of the All-Party Parliamentary Group (APPG) on Aviation, Travel and Aerospace. He is also an officer on the APPGs on the Ahmadiyya Muslim Community, British Hindus, and Hospice and End of Life Care.

== Personal life ==
Taylor resides in Sutton, within his constituency, with his family.

Parliament of the United Kingdom
Preceded by Paul Scully	Member of Parliament for Sutton and Cheam; 2024–present	Incumbent
