= Alison Suttie, Baroness Suttie =

British politician

The Right Honourable The Baroness Suttie
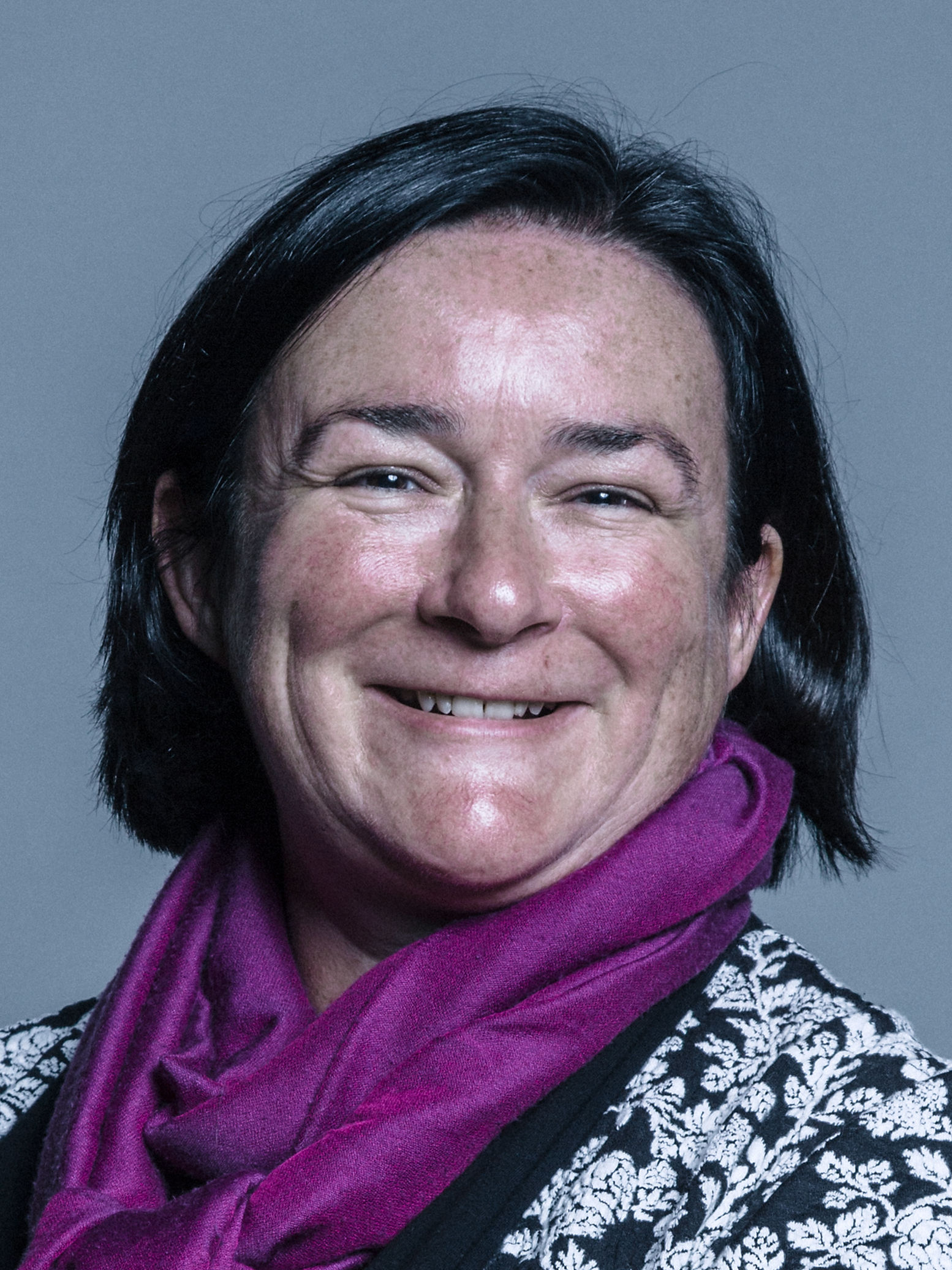

Member of the House of Lords
- Lord Temporal
- Life peerage 17 September 2013

Personal details
- Born: Alison Suttie; 27 August 1968 (age 58) Hawick, Roxburghshire Scotland
- Party: Liberal Democrats

Alison Mary Suttie, Baroness Suttie (born 27 August 1968) is a British Liberal Democrat politician. She was appointed a life peer in the House of Lords in September 2013. A party whip, she is a member of the Liberal Democrat foreign affairs team. She is also a trustee on the board of IPPR.

She is a campaigner for public awareness of tuberculosis in the UK and internationally and also a campaigner on homelessness issues.

== Education ==
Suttie went to Hawick High School (1980–1986), and graduated with a degree in French and Russian from Heriot-Watt University, Edinburgh in 1990.

In 1988, she studied at the Voronezh State University in Russia, and then the University of Upper Alsace the following year. After graduation from Heriot-Watt she worked in St Petersburg, Russia as an English teacher from 1990 to 1991.

== Liberal Democrat career ==
From 2002 to 2004, she was the press secretary and Policy Advisor to the Irish politician and President of the European Parliament, Pat Cox MEP (ELDR Group), and worked in the Central-Eastern European countries in the run up to the 2004 enlargement of the European Union.

From 2006 to 2010, Suttie was Head of the Liberal Democrat Leader's Office where she worked in the House of Commons for Menzies Campbell, Vince Cable and Nick Clegg.

As the Liberal Democrat Campaign Manager, she planned and executed the party's 2010 General Election Campaign.

After the 2010 election produced a hung parliament, she was the Liberal Democrat negotiating team's coordinator in the coalition negotiations with both the Conservative and Labour parties which eventually led to the formation of the Conservative-Liberal Democrat Coalition Government.

She was Deputy Chief of Staff and Special Adviser (Political Relations) to Nick Clegg, in the Office of the Deputy Prime Minister from May 2010 to October 2011. Suttie was initially special adviser to then-Scotland secretary Danny Alexander, but moved to serve Nick Clegg when then Chief Secretary to the Treasury David Laws resigned over his parliamentary expenses claims.

Suttie was created a life peer on 17 September 2013 taking the title Baroness Suttie, of Hawick in the Scottish Borders.

== Consultant ==
Since 2012 Suttie has worked as a self-employed political campaign training consultant (Suttie Consulting). She has worked in Tunisia and Moldova and runs training courses on campaigning and lobbying for civil servants, NGOs and charities.

== See also ==
- List of barons in the peerages of Britain and Ireland
