= Danny Chambers =

British politician and veterinarian (born 1982)

Danny Chambers MP FRCVS
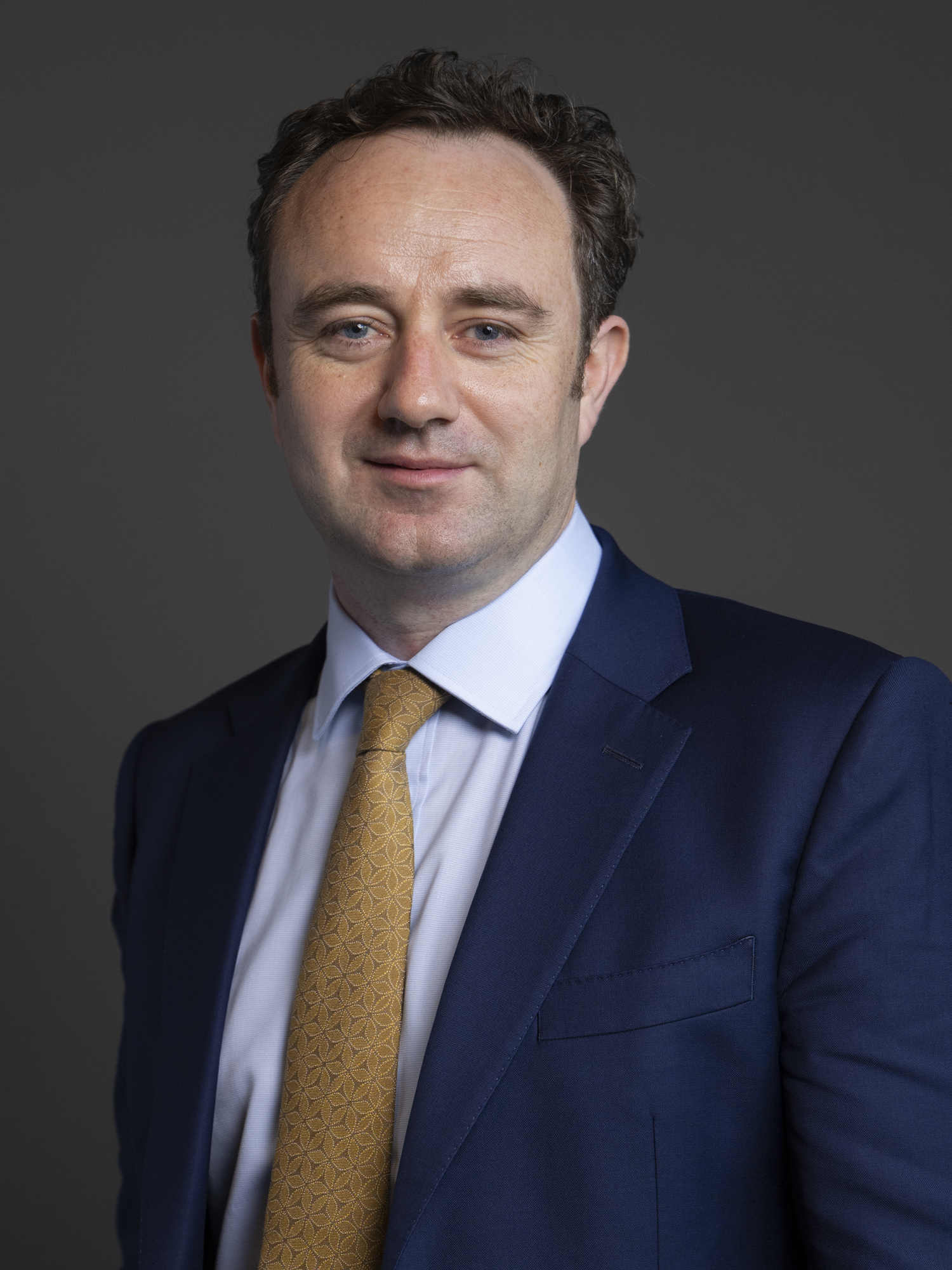
- Official portrait, 2024

Member of Parliament for Winchester
- Incumbent
- Assumed office 4 July 2024
- Preceded by: Steve Brine
- Majority: 13,821 (24.2%)

Liberal Democrat spokesperson for Mental Health
- Incumbent
- Assumed office 18 September 2024
- Leader: Ed Davey

Personal details
- Born: Danny Seiorse Chambers; 12 January 1982 (age 44) Plymouth, England
- Party: Liberal Democrat
- Education: University of Liverpool (BVSc, MSc)

Danny Seiorse Chambers (born 12 January 1982) is a British Liberal Democrat politician and veterinary surgeon who has been Member of Parliament (MP) for Winchester since 2024. Chambers is the founder of Veterinary Voices UK and a trustee of Vetlife, a mental health charity. He lives in Shawford, Hampshire, with his partner.

Chambers currently sits on the Liberal Democrat frontbench team as the Spokesperson for Mental Health.

== Early life and education ==
Danny Seiorse Chambers was born in Plymouth and grew up on a farm near Lifton in Devon. He studied at Tavistock College, serving as head boy and gaining A-levels in biology, chemistry and physics. He graduated from the University of Liverpool in 2006 with an MSc degree in infectious disease control and in 2008 with a BVSc degree in veterinary medicine.

== Veterinary career ==
Chambers is an elected member of the council of the Royal College of Veterinary Surgeons, serving from 2017 to 2025. He has contributed to the magazine New Scientist. Chambers has worked with volunteers for veterinary charities in India, Morocco and The Gambia. He has participated in public health programmes to eradicate rabies from street dogs. He has also worked to improve the lives of working equids, where people are reliant on them for their income. Chambers is the founder of Veterinary Voices UK and a trustee of Vetlife, a mental health charity.

Chambers gave up his veterinary practice upon entering Parliament in 2024.

== Political career ==
In the 2019 general election, Chambers stood as the Liberal Democrat candidate for North Cornwall. Chambers received 30.8 per cent of the vote, coming second to the incumbent MP, Scott Mann.

In the 2024 general election, Chambers was the Liberal Democrat candidate for Winchester against Flick Drummond, the incumbent MP for the part of the Winchester constituency that had been in the constituency of Meon Valley prior to 2024, winning with 52.5 per cent of the vote and a 13,821-vote majority. Chambers had initially been selected as the candidate in 2021.

On 12 September 2024, he made his maiden speech in the House of Commons during the Sir David Amess Adjournment Debate. On 18 September 2024, Ed Davey announced his new Frontbench Team: Chambers became Spokesperson for Mental Health within the team. Chambers was subsequently selected by Ballot to bring forward a Private Members Bill, for which he brought forward the Animal Welfare (Import of Dogs, Cats and Ferrets) Bill, which seeks to regulate and reduce the number of pets that can be brought into Great Britain, and the movement of heavily pregnant and mutilated pets, and raising the minimum age at which puppies and kittens could be imported to six months. The government and opposition both supported it from its second reading on 29 November 2024. The bill is also supported by the Dogs Trust, BVA, and RSPCA. In December 2025, the bill received Royal Assent, becoming law. Chambers stated the bill would close loopholes, and address the public health risk of smuggled animals.

Since his election, Chambers has also asked three Prime Minister's Questions. On 16 October 2024 he challenged government plans to remove consultant-led maternity services and the A&E unit at Winchester hospital, asking Keir Starmer to reassure constituents that the services remain at the RHCH and that an existing backlog of maintenance at the hospital be cleared. On 15 January 2025 he raised the issue of rising cases of Antimicrobial-resistant bacteria emerging in Ukraine due to the ongoing war. On 5 February 2025 he called for the Prime Minister to commit to improving maternity care and women’s health services as a top priority.

Parliament of the United Kingdom
Preceded by Steve Brine	Member of Parliament for Winchester; 2024–present	Incumbent
