= Anna Sabine =

British politician (elected 2024)

Anna Sabine MP
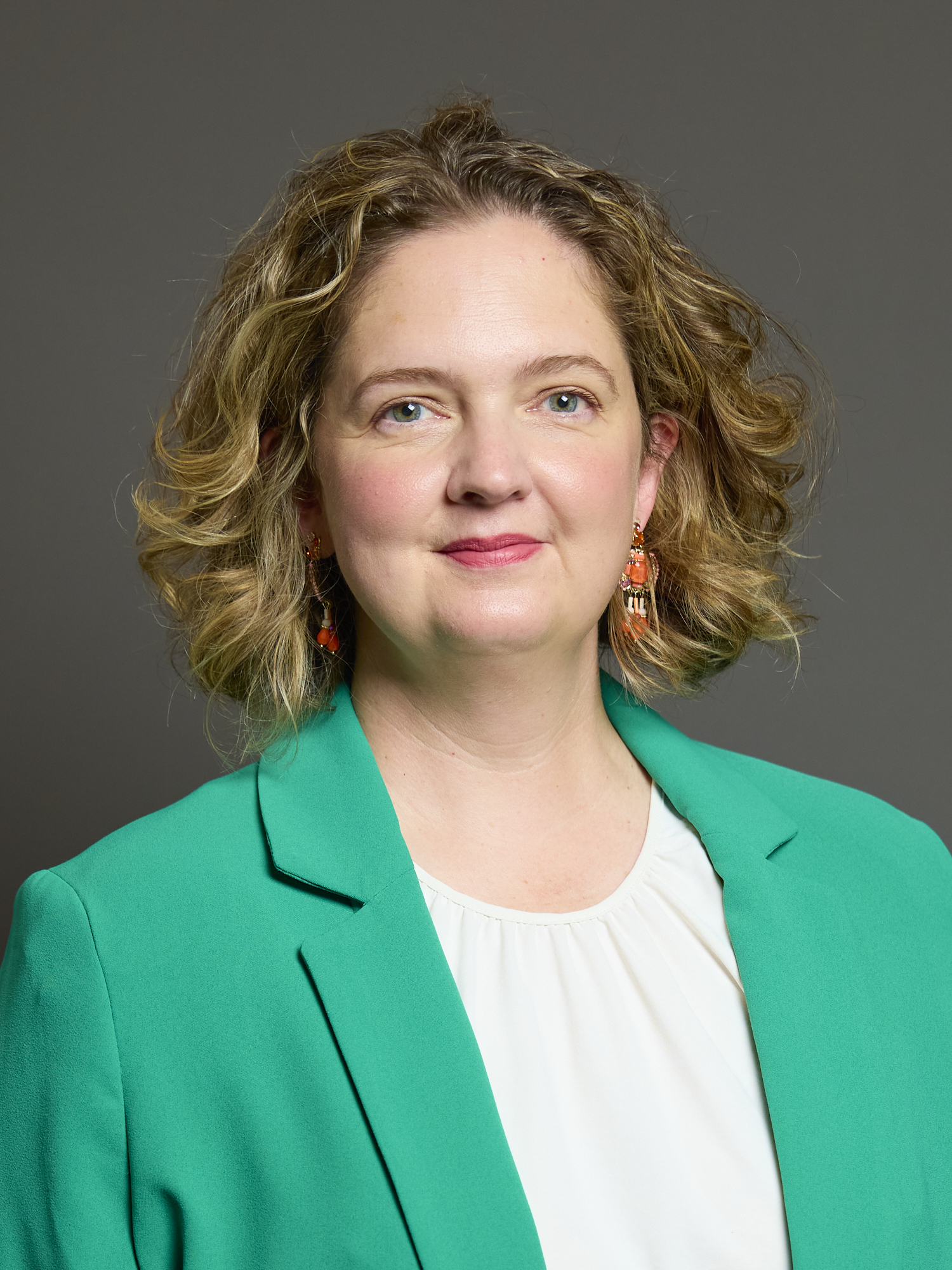
- Official portrait, 2024

Member of Parliament for Frome and East Somerset
- Incumbent
- Assumed office 4 July 2024
- Preceded by: Constituency established
- Majority: 5,415 (11.6%)

Liberal Democrat spokesperson for Culture, Media and Sport
- Incumbent
- Assumed office 1 October 2025
- Leader: Ed Davey
- Preceded by: Max Wilkinson

Personal details
- Party: Liberal Democrats
- Education: Wadham College, University of Oxford

Anna Elizabeth Sabine is a British Liberal Democrat politician who has been the Member of Parliament for Frome and East Somerset since 2024.

== Early life ==
Sabine grew up in Bishopstoke, Hampshire. She studied Philosophy, politics, and economics at Wadham College, University of Oxford.

== Political career ==
Sabine was elected to the new seat of Frome and East Somerset in 2024, with 16,580 votes (35.5%), a majority of 5,415. She serves as parliamentary private secretary to Ed Davey. Following the Liberal Democrat Conference in Bournemouth in September 2025, Sabine joined the frontbench as Culture, Media and Sport spokeswoman. She was a candidate for Chair of the Parliamentary Party in 2025 but lost to Steff Aquarone.

== Personal life ==
Sabine moved to the area in about 2004. She has two children, who were teenagers when she was first elected.

Parliament of the United Kingdom
New constituency	Member of Parliament for Frome and East Somerset; 2024–present	Incumbent
