= Josh Babarinde =

British politician (born 1993)

Josh Babarinde OBE MP
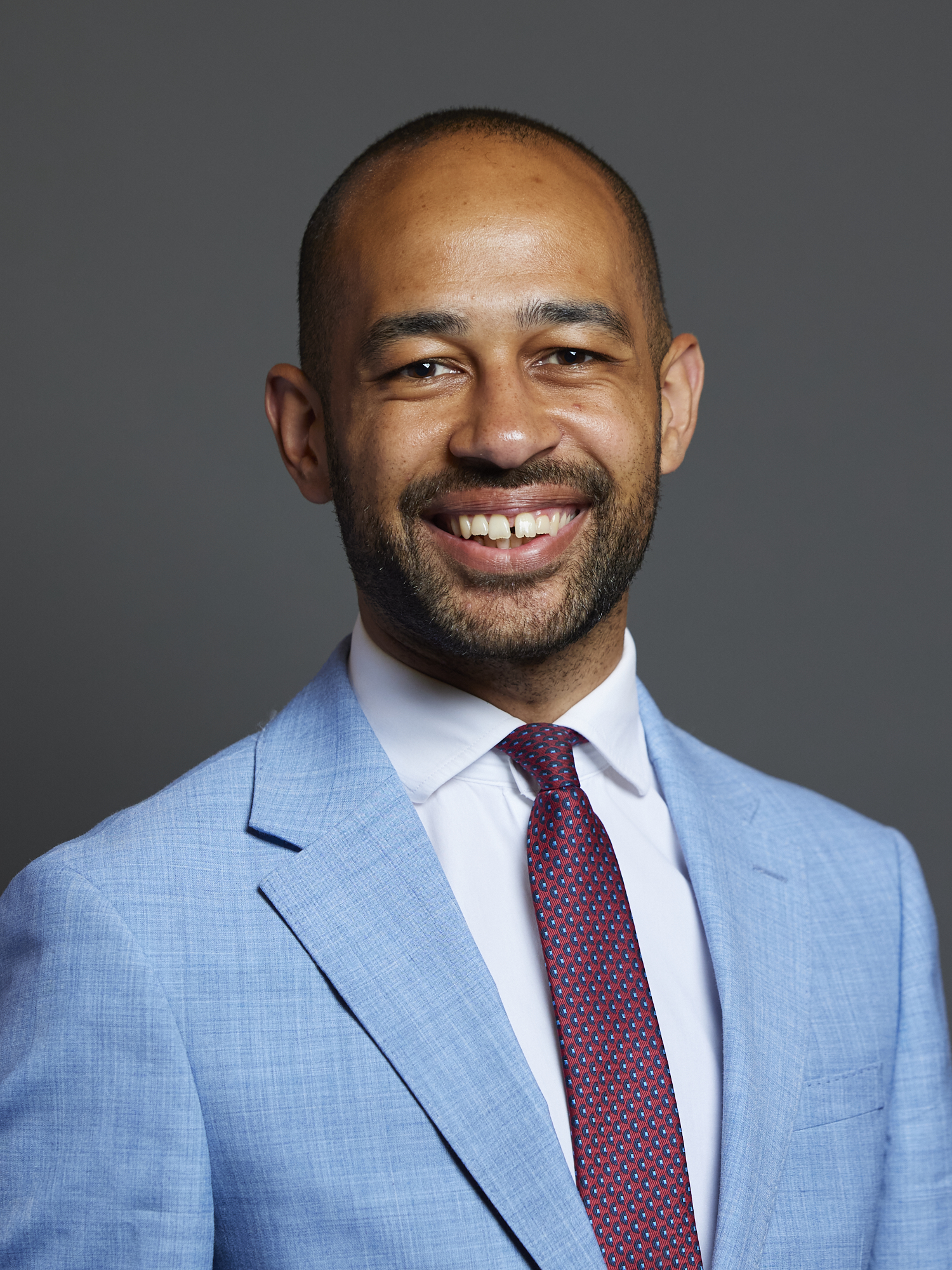
- Official portrait, 2024

President of the Liberal Democrats
- Incumbent
- Assumed office 1 January 2026
- Vice President: Victoria Collins
- Leader: Ed Davey
- Preceded by: Mark Pack

Member of Parliament for Eastbourne
- Incumbent
- Assumed office 4 July 2024
- Preceded by: Caroline Ansell
- Majority: 12,204 (26.8%)

Liberal Democrat Spokesperson for Justice
- In office 18 September 2024 – 1 October 2025
- Leader: Ed Davey
- Preceded by: Alistair Carmichael
- Succeeded by: Jess Brown-Fuller

Eastbourne Borough Councillor for Hampden Park
- In office 6 May 2021 – 8 May 2023
- Preceded by: Dean Sabri
- Succeeded by: Teri Sayers-Cooper

Personal details
- Born: Joshua Thomas Aderele Babarinde; 20 June 1993 (age 33) Eastbourne, East Sussex, England
- Party: Liberal Democrats
- Spouse: Connor Cummings (m. 2026)
- Education: London School of Economics (BSc)
- Website: www.josh.org.uk

Joshua Thomas Aderele Babarinde (born 20 June 1993) is an English Liberal Democrat politician and social entrepreneur who has served as Member of Parliament (MP) for Eastbourne since 2024.

== Early life and education ==
Joshua Thomas Aderele Babarinde was born in 1993 at the Eastbourne District General Hospital. He studied at the Cavendish School where he completed his GCSEs and then at East Sussex College between 2009 and 2011 where he completed his A-Levels, and went on to study politics and government at the London School of Economics.

== Career ==
=== Early career ===
After graduation, Babarinde won a place on the social enterprise fellowship Year Here. During this time he volunteered as a youth worker in east London, working with young people to find an alternative path to crime and gang violence. Inspired by this experience he founded Cracked It, a social enterprise offering smart phone repair services provided by youth at risk and young ex-offenders. Cracked It was the recipient of Social Enterprise of the Year awards by both the Centre for Social Justice and the Evening Standard.

Babarinde has won numerous accolades for his social entrepreneurship achievements, including a Shackleton Award and a Winston Churchill Fellowship. In 2019, he was named in the Forbes 30 Under 30 list of social entrepreneurs. Babarinde went on to work as Head of Learning and Innovation at the School for Social Entrepreneurs in 2020. He was appointed Officer of the Order of the British Empire (OBE) in the 2020 Birthday Honours for his services to criminal justice, social enterprise and the economy.

During the COVID-19 pandemic, Babarinde was trained by St John Ambulance to serve as a volunteer COVID-19 vaccinator in Eastbourne.

=== Political career ===
During the 2019 general election, Babarinde stood as the Liberal Democrat candidate for Bethnal Green and Bow, coming third.

Babarinde won a by-election to Eastbourne Borough Council in the ward of Hampden Park on 6 May 2021. He stood down as a councillor at the 2023 council election to focus on his parliamentary election campaign.

In 2022, Babarinde contributed a chapter to The Battle for Liberal Britain, a book edited by Liberal Democrat leader Sir Ed Davey, in which he proposed to re-envision council estates as business incubators.

Babarinde stood for Parliament in the 2024 general election in his local constituency of Eastbourne, aiming to unseat Conservative MP Caroline Ansell, who had been one of his school teachers. He was elected with a majority of over 12,000. In September 2024, Babarinde was selected as the Liberal Democrats' parliamentary spokesperson for Justice.

In 2025, Babarinde was elected President of the Liberal Democrats. He began his term on 1 January 2026.

== Personal life ==
In 2024, PinkNews listed Babarinde among a number of out LGBTQ+ parliamentarians. On 17 November 2025, he announced that he was engaged to his partner Connor Cummings, an NHS doctor from Edinburgh, after proposing in the House of Commons. The couple married in summer 2026 at St Giles' Cathedral in Edinburgh, before having a second ceremony in Eastbourne. The Edinburgh ceremony was officiated by Scott Rennie, the first openly gay minister in the Church of Scotland.

Babarinde is a trustee of the Towner Art Gallery in Eastbourne.

Parliament of the United Kingdom
Preceded by Caroline Ansell	Member of Parliament for Eastbourne; 2024–present	Incumbent
Party political offices
Preceded by Mark Pack	President of the Liberal Democrats; 2026–present	Incumbent
