= Sarah Gibson (politician) =

British Liberal Democrat politician

Sarah Gibson MP
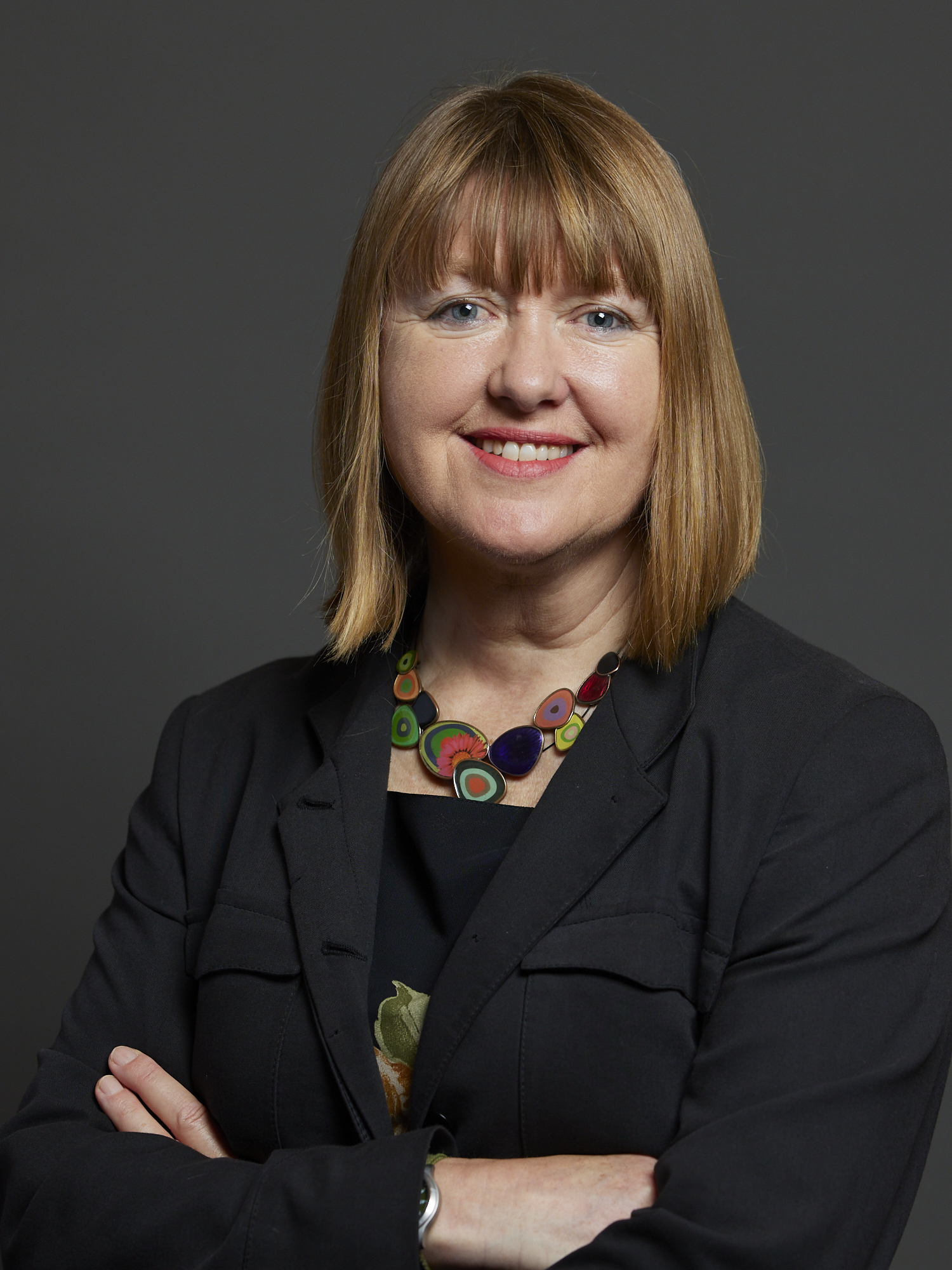
- Official portrait, 2024

Member of Parliament for Chippenham
- Incumbent
- Assumed office 4 July 2024
- Preceded by: Michelle Donelan
- Majority: 8,138 (11.2%)

Liberal Democrat spokesperson for Business
- In office 18 September 2024 – 1 October 2025
- Leader: Ed Davey
- Preceded by: Sarah Olney
- Succeeded by: Sarah Olney

Personal details
- Born: April 1966 (age 60)
- Party: Liberal Democrats
- Education: Ralph Allen School; Kingston University London; The Bartlett, UCL
- Website: chippenhamlibdems.org.uk/sarah-gibson

Sarah Gibson (born April 1966) is a British Liberal Democrat politician who has been the Member of Parliament (MP) for Chippenham since the 2024 general election. Before her election to parliament, Gibson was elected to Wiltshire Council in 2017 and 2021.

== Early life and career ==
Gibson attended the comprehensive Ralph Allen School. She graduated with a BA in architecture from Kingston University in 1987 and gained a postgraduate diploma in architecture at University College London's Bartlett School of Architecture and Planning (now The Bartlett) in 1991.

Gibson is a director and shareholder, since 2014 and 2016 respectively, of the Bradford-on-Avon architecture firm Labox (stylised as LABOX). In December 2022, she began working as a part-time tutor at the University of Bath's Engineering and Architecture department.

According to the Wiltshire Times, "after qualifying as an architect, she set up a practice in Barcelona, before coming back to Wiltshire in 2013."

== Political career ==
=== Councillor ===
Gibson was first elected to Wiltshire Council in May 2017 serving the Bradford-on-Avon South division, within the Melksham and Devizes Constituency. She was elected again in May 2021.

As a member of several council committees, including the strategic planning committee, Gibson has voted to refuse applications submitted for the locally controversial £200m Westbury incinerator.

In 2021, Gibson, who was first elected a town councillor in May 2018, served as the mayor of Bradford-on-Avon.

==== 2024 general election campaign ====
During the UK's 2024 general election campaign, in which she was a parliamentary candidate, Gibson represented Liberal Democrats in Wiltshire on a debate programme (released 19 June 2024) for the BBC's Your Voice, Your Vote: Election 2024 series.

She also took part in one of the Lib Dem leader Sir Ed Davey's election campaign stunts on 3 July 2024. Gibson, Lib Dem activists, and local & national media watched Sir Ed Davey drive a yellow JCB tractor around a Wiltshire field vowing to knock down the blue wall.

=== Parliamentary career ===
Gibson was elected as the Member of Parliament for Chippenham at the 2024 general election, winning with 45.5% of the vote and a majority of 8,138.

Parliament of the United Kingdom
Preceded by Michelle Donelan	Member of Parliament for Chippenham; 2024–present	Incumbent
