= Victoria Collins =

British politician

Victoria Collins MP
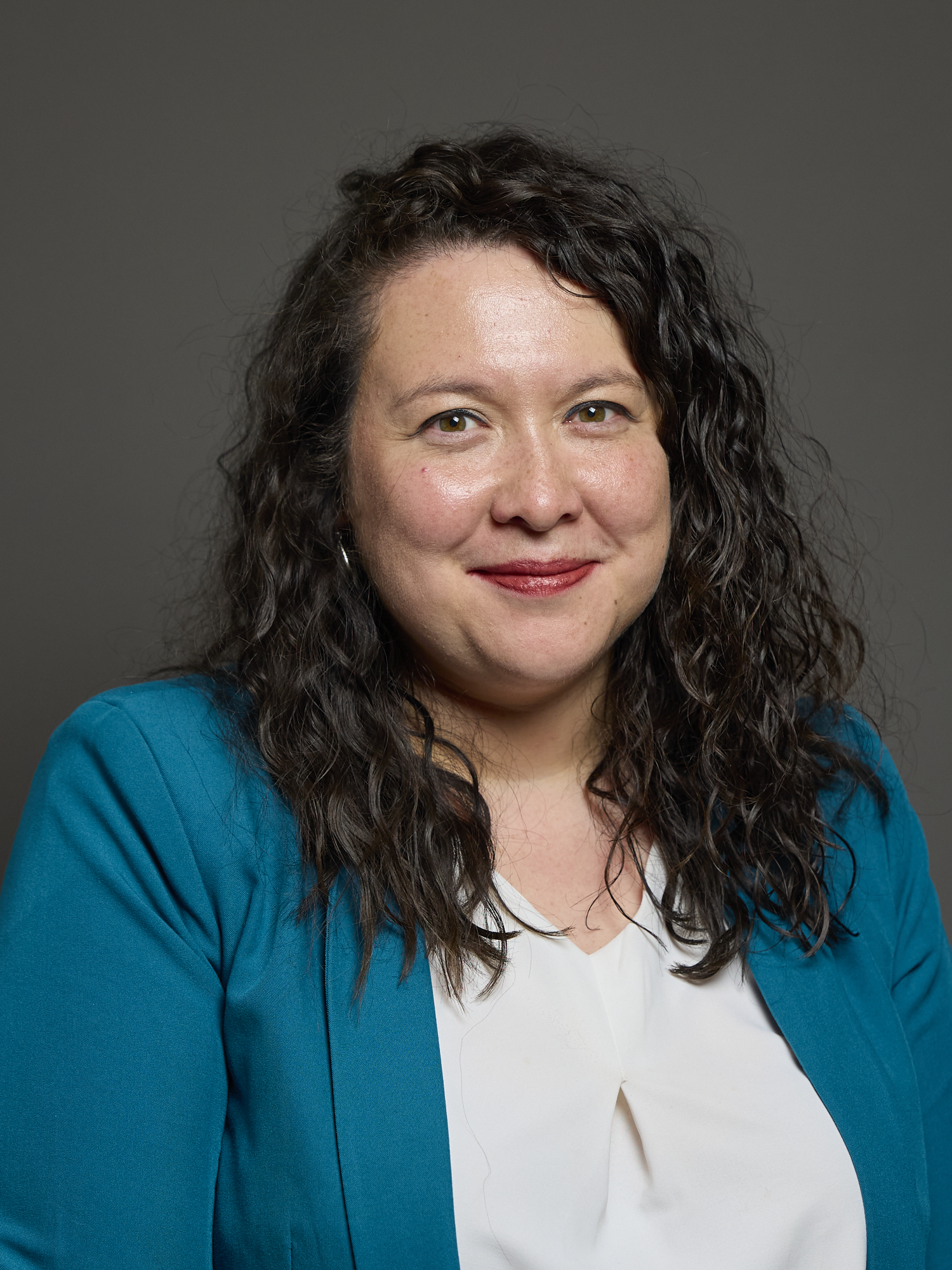
- Official portrait, 2024

Vice President of the Liberal Democrats
- Incumbent
- Assumed office 1 January 2026
- President: Josh Babarinde
- Leader: Ed Davey
- Preceded by: Amna Ahmad

Member of Parliament for Harpenden and Berkhamsted
- Incumbent
- Assumed office 4 July 2024
- Preceded by: Constituency established
- Majority: 10,708 (19.7%)

Liberal Democrat spokesperson for Science, Innovation and Technology
- Incumbent
- Assumed office 18 September 2024
- Leader: Ed Davey
- Preceded by: Position established

Personal details
- Party: Liberal Democrats
- Education: Van Mildert College, Durham; Sciences Po

Victoria Mei Elizabeth Collins is a Liberal Democrat politician and entrepreneur who has served as Member of Parliament (MP) for Harpenden and Berkhamsted since 2024.

== Background ==
Collins was privately educated at Newcastle upon Tyne Church High School, before studying history at Durham University from 2006 to 2009. She later completed a master's degree in international economic policy at Sciences Po in Paris.

She is of Chinese-Malaysian descent. In her maiden speech in Parliament, Collins indicated that her mother arrived in the United Kingdom from Malaysia for her education in 1974, and her mother went on to run a shop where Victoria helped as she was growing up.

== Early career ==
She has previously worked on economic and environmental policy in the European Parliament, and was a contributor on Forbes's website. She has also worked as an independent consultant on sustainability.

== Political career ==
Collins contested the constituency of Poole in Dorset for the Liberal Democrats at the 2019 general election. She came third, with 15.5% of the vote.

Collins was selected as the Liberal Democrat prospective parliamentary candidate for the South West Hertfordshire constituency in October 2022. However, due to the 2023 Boundary Commission changes, she was no longer located within the constituency, and she therefore was made to be the candidate for the Harpenden and Berkhamsted constituency. She was elected to represent the constituency with a majority of 10,708 votes over the second place Conservative candidate Nigel Gardner.

Parliament of the United Kingdom
New constituency	Member of Parliament for Harpenden and Berkhamsted; 2024–present	Incumbent
