= Vice President of the Liberal Democrats =

Liberal Democrat Party Position

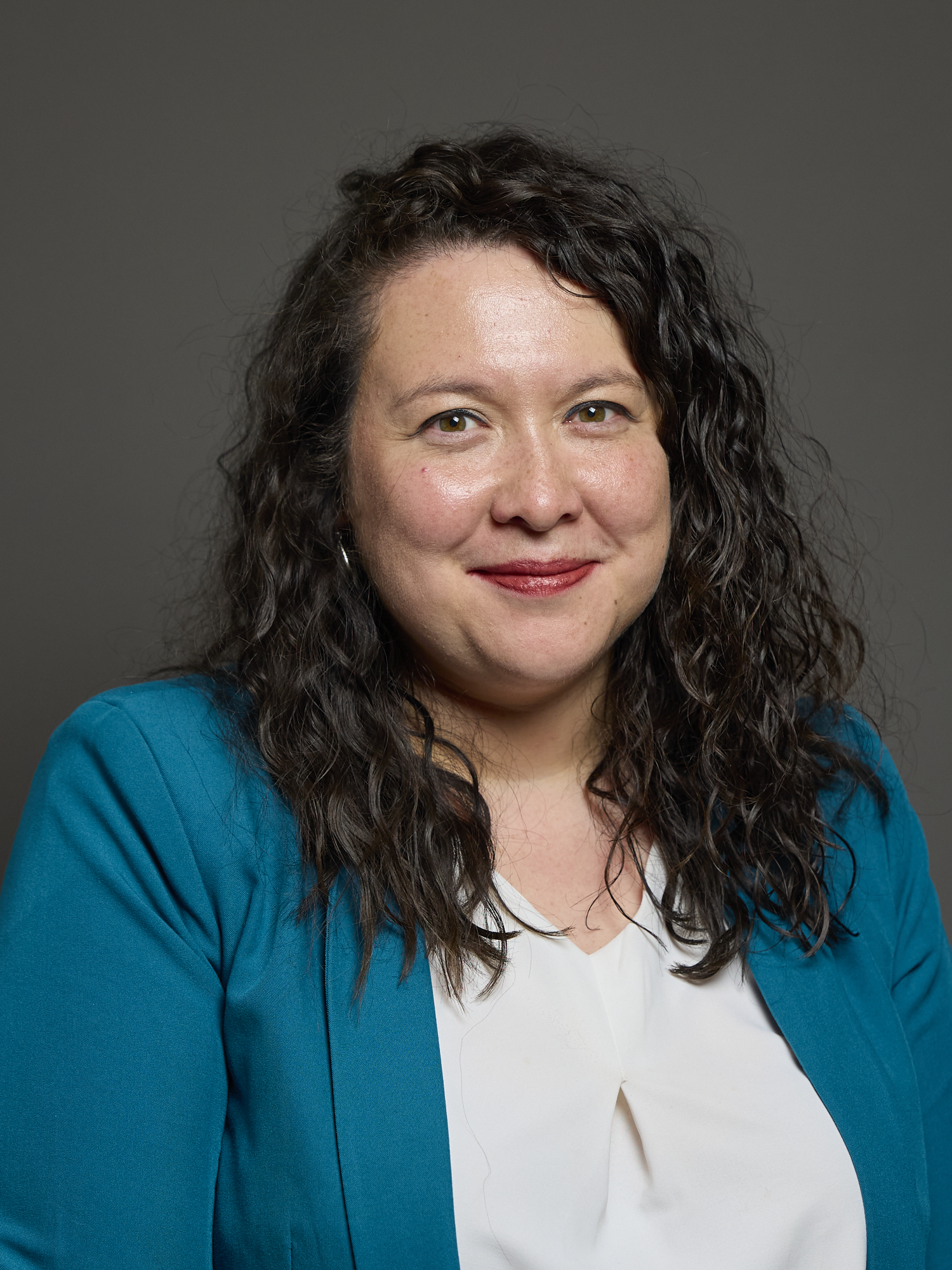
- Incumbent; Victoria Collins since 1 January 2026
- Member of: Federal Board
- Reports to: Liberal Democrats
- Appointer: Liberal Democrats
- Formation: 2019
- First holder: Isabelle Parasram

The Vice President of the Liberal Democrats is a party-level role working internally within the party and a voting member of the Federal board.

The role was created to increase engagement with ethnic minority communities; the first Vice President was first elected in 2019. The role was also known as the "Vice President for BaME" prior to 2021. Prior to 2021, the vice president was elected by the Federal Board rather than by party members, and did not have a vote at the Federal Board.

== List of party vice presidents to date ==
| President | Term of Office | | Elections | Leader |
|---|---|---|---|---|
| Isabelle Parasram | 20 March 2019 | 2021 | 2019 | Vince Cable; Jo Swinson; Ed Davey |
| Amna Ahmad | 2021 | 31 December 2025 | 2024 | Ed Davey |
| Victoria Collins; MP for Harpenden and Berkhamsted | 1 January 2026 | Incumbent | – | Ed Davey |

| Member of the House of Commons |
| Member of the House of Lords |
| Non-parliamentarian |

== Timeline ==
=== Elections ===
==== 2025 ====
| Candidate | Votes |
|---|---|
| Victoria Collins | 2788 |
| Kamran Hussain | 2102 |

==== 2022 ====
Amna Ahmad was reelected unopposed.

==== 2021 ====
| Candidate | Vote stage | | | |
| Candidate | 1 | 2 | 3 | 4 |
|---|---|---|---|---|
| Amna Ahmad | 1814 | 1890 | 2017 | 2123 |
| Roderick Lynch | 1154 | 1192 | 1277 | 1684 |
| Marisha Ray | 672 | 702 | 792 | |
| Rabi Martins | 407 | 436 | 473 | |
| Julliet Makhapila | 354 | 373 | | |
| Tahir Maher | 221 | | | |
