= Liberal Democrats leadership election =

Liberal Democrats leadership election may refer to:

== Leadership ==
- 1999 Liberal Democrats leadership election
- 2006 Liberal Democrats leadership election
- 2007 Liberal Democrats leadership election
- 2015 Liberal Democrats leadership election
- 2017 Liberal Democrats leadership election
- 2019 Liberal Democrats leadership election
- 2020 Liberal Democrats leadership election
- 2024 Liberal Democrats leadership election

== Deputy leadership ==
- 2003 Liberal Democrats deputy leadership election
- 2006 Liberal Democrats deputy leadership election
- 2010 Liberal Democrats deputy leadership election
- 2014 Liberal Democrats deputy leadership election
- 2017 Liberal Democrats deputy leadership election
- 2019 Liberal Democrats deputy leadership election
- 2020 Liberal Democrats deputy leadership election

== Scotland ==
- 2005 Scottish Liberal Democrats leadership election
- 2008 Scottish Liberal Democrats leadership election
- 2011 Scottish Liberal Democrats leadership election
- 2021 Scottish Liberal Democrats leadership election

== Wales ==
- 2007 Welsh Liberal Democrats leadership election
- 2008 Welsh Liberal Democrats leadership election
- 2016 Welsh Liberal Democrats leadership election
- 2017 Welsh Liberal Democrats leadership election

== See also ==
- Liberal Democratic Party leadership election (disambiguation)
- Liberal Party leadership election (disambiguation)
- 1988 Social and Liberal Democrats leadership election
