= Deputy Leader of the Liberal Democrats =

Political office

Deputy Leader of the Liberal Democrat Parliamentary Party
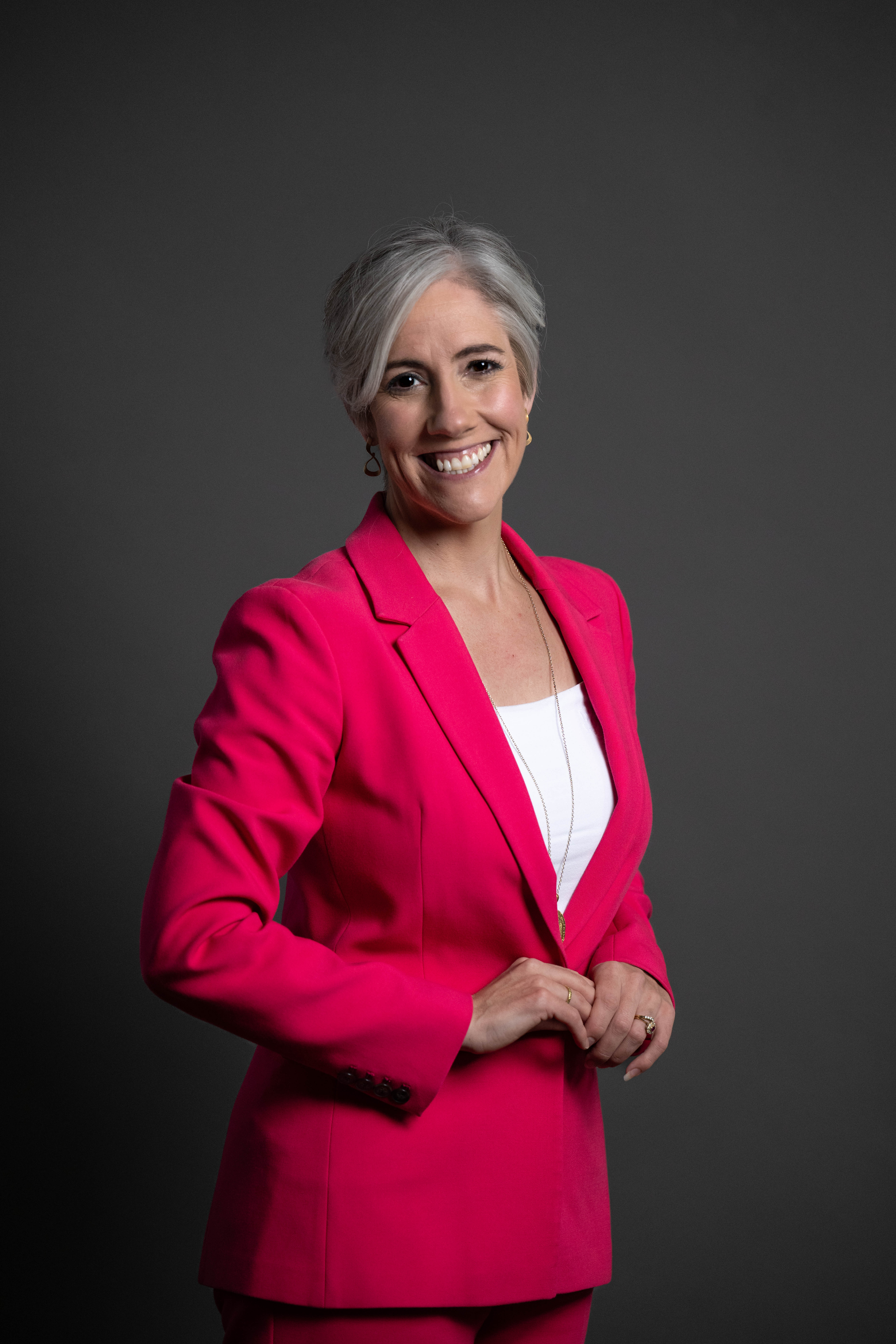
- Incumbent; Daisy Cooper since 13 September 2020
- Reports to: Leader of Liberal Democrats
- Appointer: Liberal Democrats
- Term length: Four years
- Inaugural holder: Russell Johnston
- Formation: 3 March 1988

The office of deputy leader of the Liberal Democrats (officially deputy leader of the Liberal Democrat Parliamentary Party) is a position within the Liberal Democrats, a liberal political party in the United Kingdom. The position of Deputy Leader has never formally existed in the party constitution, however since the party's foundation, the Liberal Democrat parliamentary group in the House of Commons have usually elected a Deputy Leader. Although often referred to as the Deputy Leader of the Liberal Democrats, this post is actually only Deputy Leader of the Liberal Democrat parliamentary group in the House of Commons and not Deputy Leader of the Lib Dems as a whole.

Daisy Cooper was elected by her fellow MPs to the post of Deputy Leader following Ed Davey's election to the post of leader in September 2020.

== List of Deputy Leaders of the Liberal Democrats ==
#	Name	Portrait	Constituency	Term began	Term ended	Concurrent Office(s)	Leader(s)
1	Russell Johnston (1932–2008)		Inverness, Nairn and Lochaber	16 July 1988	13 April 1992	President of the Scottish Liberal Democrats	Ashdown
2	Alan Beith (1943–)		Berwick-upon-Tweed	13 April 1992	12 February 2003	Liberal Democrat Home Affairs spokesman Shadow Leader of the Commons	Ashdown
2	Alan Beith (1943–)		Berwick-upon-Tweed	13 April 1992	12 February 2003	Liberal Democrat Home Affairs spokesman Shadow Leader of the Commons	Kennedy
3	Menzies Campbell (1941–2025)		North East Fife	12 February 2003	2 March 2006	Spokesperson for Foreign Affairs	Kennedy
3	Menzies Campbell (1941–2025)		North East Fife	12 February 2003	2 March 2006	Spokesperson for Foreign Affairs	Campbell^{1}
4	Vince Cable (1943–)		Twickenham	2 March 2006	26 May 2010	Spokesperson for the Treasury; Acting Leader of the Liberal Democrats; Secretary of State for Business, Innovation and Skills; President of the Board of Trade	Campbell^{1}
4	Vince Cable (1943–)		Twickenham	2 March 2006	26 May 2010	Spokesperson for the Treasury; Acting Leader of the Liberal Democrats; Secretary of State for Business, Innovation and Skills; President of the Board of Trade	Cable^{2}
4	Vince Cable (1943–)		Twickenham	2 March 2006	26 May 2010	Spokesperson for the Treasury; Acting Leader of the Liberal Democrats; Secretary of State for Business, Innovation and Skills; President of the Board of Trade	Clegg
5	Simon Hughes (1951–)		Bermondsey and Old Southwark	9 June 2010	28 January 2014	Minister of State for Justice and Civil Liberties	Clegg
6	Malcolm Bruce (1944–)		Gordon	28 January 2014	8 May 2015	Chair of the International Development Committee	Clegg
Office not in use 8 May 2015 – 20 June 2017							Clegg
Office not in use 8 May 2015 – 20 June 2017							Farron
7	Jo Swinson (1980–)		East Dunbartonshire	20 June 2017	22 July 2019	Spokesperson for Foreign Affairs	Farron
7	Jo Swinson (1980–)		East Dunbartonshire	20 June 2017	22 July 2019	Spokesperson for Foreign Affairs	Cable
8	Ed Davey (1965–)		Kingston and Surbiton	3 September 2019	27 August 2020	Spokesperson for the Treasury; Spokesperson for Business, Energy and Industrial Strategy	Swinson
8	Ed Davey (1965–)		Kingston and Surbiton	3 September 2019	27 August 2020	Spokesperson for the Treasury; Spokesperson for Business, Energy and Industrial Strategy	Himself and Pack (acting)^{3}
9	Daisy Cooper (1981–)		St Albans	13 September 2020	Incumbent	Spokesperson for Education; Spokesperson for Health and Social Care; Spokesperson for Treasury	Davey

Notes:

- ^{1} Campbell served as acting leader between the resignation of Charles Kennedy on 7 January 2006 and his own election as leader on 2 March 2006.
- ^{2} Cable served as acting leader between the resignation of Menzies Campbell on 15 October 2007 and the election of Nick Clegg on 18 December 2007.
- ^{3} After leader Jo Swinson lost her seat in the 2019 General Election, Ed Davey in his role as Deputy Leader and Mark Pack as Party President became acting co-leaders until a leadership election could be held in 2020.

== See also ==
- Deputy Leader of the Conservative Party (UK)
- Deputy Leader of the Labour Party (UK)
