= Lewes District Council elections =

Local government elections in East Sussex, England

Lewes District Council in East Sussex, England is elected every four years. Since the last boundary changes in 2019, 41 councillors are elected from 21 wards.

== Political parties ==
From its formation, until 2013, the council comprised mainly Conservative and Liberal Democrat or Liberal councillors, with a small number of independents and some Labour councillors at different points. However, in 2013 two Conservative members of the council crossed the floor and joined UKIP, giving the party its first Lewes District councillors. This also meant that the Conservatives lost control of the council, putting it in No overall control. In 2015, neither of the previous UKIP members were re-elected; however, a new UKIP District Councillor was elected to the council, and, for the first time in its history, three Green Party councillors.

2019 saw the Conservative Party return 19 councillors, and the Green Party increase their representation to nine councillors, becoming the second largest party, ahead of the Liberal Democrats, who managed eight. The Labour Party elected three councillors, and they were joined by two Independents.

However in 2021, one Green Party Councillor left the Green Party to join the Liberal Democrats on Lewes Council, making the Liberal Democrats the second largest party. In 2022 the Labour Party gained a seat from the Conservatives in a by-election. Then, in the 2023 local elections for all 41 Council seats, the Conservatives and Independents lost all of their remaining seats of Lewes Council, leaving the Green Party as the largest group, the Liberal Democrats as the second largest group, and the Labour Party as the remaining group.

== Council composition ==
Composition of the council
Year	Conservative	Liberal Democrats (Note: Includes totals for the predecessors of the Liberal Democrats, the Liberal Party and SDP (both of which participated in the Alliance).)	Labour	Green	UKIP	Independents & Others	Council control after election
Local government reorganisation; council established (47 seats)
1973	29	0	10	–	–	8	Conservative
1976	37	0	6	0	–	4	Conservative
1979	38	1	5	0	–	3	Conservative
New ward boundaries (47 seats)
1983	39	4	0	0	–	5	Conservative
1987	34	11	0	0	–	3	Conservative
1991	18	27	0	0	–	3	Liberal Democrats
1995	16	28	2	0	0	2	Liberal Democrats
1999	16	30	0	0	0	2	Liberal Democrats
New ward boundaries (40 seats)
2003	11	28	0	0	0	2	Liberal Democrats
2007	17	23	0	0	0	1	Liberal Democrats
2011	22	18	0	0	0	1	Conservative
2015	24	11	0	3	1	2	Conservative
New ward boundaries (40 seats)
2019	19	8	3	9	0	2	No overall control
2023	0	15	9	17	0	0	No overall control

== Results maps ==
2003 results map

2007 results map

2011 results map

2015 results map

2019 results map

2023 results map

== By-election results ==
=== 1999–2003 ===
Peacehaven North By-Election 6 December 2001
Party	Candidate	Votes	%	±%
Conservative		450	49.3	+10.1
Labour		293	32.1	+10.5
Liberal Democrats		169	18.5	−20.7
Majority		157	17.2	
Turnout		912	16.3	
Conservative gain from Liberal Democrats		Swing		

=== 2003–2007 ===
Peacehaven North By-Election 15 December 2005
Party	Candidate	Votes	%	±%
Conservative	Chistopher Bishop	406	64.6	+12.7
Liberal Democrats	Carla Butler	113	18.0	−12.0
Labour	John Carden	109	17.4	−0.8
Majority		293	46.6	
Turnout		628	18.2	
Conservative hold		Swing		

Ouse Valley and Ringmer By-Election 17 August 2006
Party	Candidate	Votes	%	±%
Liberal Democrats	Peter Gardiner	715	43.7	+21.6
Conservative	Paul Gander	521	31.8	+6.5
Seagulls	Edward Bassford	359	21.9	+21.9
Labour	Trevor Hopper	41	2.5	−10.7
Majority		194	12.9	
Turnout		1,636	33.4	
Liberal Democrats gain from Independent		Swing		

=== 2015–2019 ===
Lewes Bridge by-election 2 June 2016
Party	Candidate	Votes	%	±%
Liberal Democrats	Will Elliott	543	44.6	+17.1
Green	Johnny Denis	345	28.3	+7.7
Labour	Richard Hurn	212	17.4	+1.3
Conservative	Roy Burman	117	9.6	−2.4
Majority		198	16.3	
Turnout		1,217		
Liberal Democrats hold		Swing		

Seaford West by-election 8 June 2017
Party	Candidate	Votes	%	±%
Conservative	Liz Boorman	1,573	51.8	+6.6
Liberal Democrats	Will Elliott	806	26.6	−0.5
Labour	Barbara Hayes	363	12.0	+12.0
UKIP	Eric Woodward	152	5.0	−14.2
Green	Zoe Ford	141	4.6	−3.9
Majority		767	25.3	
Turnout		3,035		
Conservative hold		Swing		

Ouse Valley & Ringmer by-election 7 September 2017
Party	Candidate	Votes	%	±%
Green	Johnny Denis	835	38.7	+22.3
Conservative	Clare Herbert	660	30.6	+1.6
Liberal Democrats	James Gardiner	457	21.2	−8.0
Labour	Tim Telford	167	7.7	−4.4
UKIP	Phil Howson	38	1.8	−11.5
Majority		175	8.1	
Turnout		2,161	42	
Green gain from Conservative		Swing		

Chailey and Wivelsfield by-election 2 July 2018
Party	Candidate	Votes	%	±%
Conservative	Nancy Bikson	563	53.6	+4.9
Liberal Democrats	Marion Hughes	324	30.8	+5.0
Labour	Nicholas Belcher	104	9.9	+9.9
Green	Brenda Barnes	60	5.7	−6.4
Majority		239	22.7	
Turnout		1,051		
Conservative hold		Swing		

=== 2019–2023 ===
Seaford East by-election 6 May 2021
Party	Candidate	Votes	%	±%
Conservative	Richard Turner	820	47.5	+6.8
Green	James Meek	452	26.2	+4.1
Liberal Democrats	Pinky Adil	347	20.1	+20.1
Labour	Ann Biddle	109	6.3	−10.2
Majority		368	21.3	
Turnout		1,728		
Conservative hold		Swing		

Seaford West by-election 6 May 2021
Party	Candidate	Votes	%	±%
Conservative	Linda Wallraven	1,028	56.3	+9.9
Liberal Democrats	Olivia Honeyman	401	22.0	+22.0
Green	Gemma McFarlane	277	15.2	−19.0
Labour	Chris Purser	120	6.6	−12.8
Majority		627	34.3	
Turnout		1,826		
Conservative hold		Swing		

Peacehaven West by-election 12 May 2022
Party	Candidate	Votes	%	±%
Labour	Ciarron Clarkson	641	54.7	+54.7
Conservative	Katie Sanderson	467	39.8	+13.8
Green	Holly Atkins	32	2.7	−14.9
Liberal Democrats	Elizabeth Lee	32	2.7	−13.8
Majority		174	14.8	
Turnout		1,172		
Labour gain from Conservative		Swing		

=== 2023–2027 ===
Wivelsfield by-election 10 October 2024
Party	Candidate	Votes	%	±%
Green	Sue Morris	315	42.3	−10.6
Liberal Democrats	Nadine Stothard	216	29.0	+18.2
Conservative	Sarah Webster	213	28.6	−7.9
Majority		99	13.3	
Turnout		744		
Green hold		Swing		

Newhaven North by-election 29 May 2025
Party	Candidate	Votes	%	±%
Liberal Democrats	Corina Watts	697	51.7	
Reform	Bill Payne	389	28.9	
Green	David Hoare	122	9.1	
Conservative	Richard Turner	59	4.4	
Independent	Steve Saunders	57	4.2	
Labour	Linda Drabble	23	1.7	
Majority		308	22.9	
Turnout		1,347		
Liberal Democrats hold		Swing		

Newhaven South by-election 7 May 2026 (2 seats)
Party	Candidate	Votes	%	±%
Liberal Democrats	James Harrison	1,105		
Liberal Democrats	Jo Pettitt	1,059		
Reform	Archie Wilson	550		
Reform	Bill Payne	474		
Green	Scott Burrell	261		
Green	Tai Ray-Jones	232		
Conservative	Catherine Boorman	151		
Conservative	Richard Turner	108		
Labour	Joe Moughrabi	102		
Liberal Democrats hold		Swing		
Liberal Democrats hold		Swing		

== See also ==
- 1983 Lewes District Council election (New ward boundaries)
- 1995 Lewes District Council election (District boundary changes took place but the number of seats remained the same)
- 2003 Lewes District Council election (New ward boundaries reduced the number of seats by 7)
- 2015 Lewes District Council election
- 2019 Lewes District Council election (New ward boundaries)
- 2023 Lewes District Council election
