= Liberal Party leadership election =

Liberal Party leadership election may refer to:

== Australia ==
- 1989 Liberal Party of Australia leadership spill
- 1990 Liberal Party of Australia leadership election
- 1994 Liberal Party of Australia leadership spill
- 1995 Liberal Party of Australia leadership spill
- 2007 Liberal Party of Australia leadership election
- 2008 Liberal Party of Australia leadership spill
- 2009 Liberal Party of Australia leadership spill
- February 2015 Liberal Party of Australia leadership spill motion
- September 2015 Liberal Party of Australia leadership spill
- 2018 Liberal Party of Australia leadership spills
- 2022 Liberal Party of Australia leadership election
- 2025 Liberal Party of Australia leadership election

=== Northern Territory ===
- 2013 Country Liberal Party leadership spill
- 2015 Country Liberal Party leadership spill

== Canada ==
Liberal Party of Canada

- 1919 Liberal Party of Canada leadership election
- 1948 Liberal Party of Canada leadership election
- 1958 Liberal Party of Canada leadership election
- 1968 Liberal Party of Canada leadership election
- 1980 Liberal Party of Canada leadership election
- 1984 Liberal Party of Canada leadership election
- 1990 Liberal Party of Canada leadership election
- 2003 Liberal Party of Canada leadership election
- 2006 Liberal Party of Canada leadership election
- 2009 Liberal Party of Canada leadership election
- 2013 Liberal Party of Canada leadership election
- 2025 Liberal Party of Canada leadership election

Liberal Party of Canada Branches

- Alberta Liberal Party leadership elections
- British Columbia Liberal Party leadership elections
- Manitoba Liberal Party leadership elections
- New Brunswick Liberal Association leadership elections
- Nova Scotia Liberal Party leadership elections
- Ontario Liberal Party leadership elections
- Prince Edward Island Liberal Party leadership elections
- Quebec Liberal Party leadership elections
- Saskatchewan Liberal Party leadership elections

Liberal Party of Newfoundland and Labrador

- Liberal Party of Newfoundland and Labrador leadership elections

== New Zealand ==
- 1889 New Zealand Liberal Party leadership election
- 1893 New Zealand Liberal Party leadership election
- 1906 New Zealand Liberal Party leadership election
- 1912 New Zealand Liberal Party leadership election
- 1913 New Zealand Liberal Party leadership election
- 1919 New Zealand Liberal Party leadership election
- 1920 New Zealand Liberal Party leadership election
- 1925 New Zealand Liberal Party leadership election
- 1928 New Zealand Liberal Party leadership election
- 1930 New Zealand Liberal Party leadership election

== United Kingdom ==
- 1967 Liberal Party leadership election
- 1976 Liberal Party leadership election

== See also ==
- Liberal Democrats leadership election
- Liberal Democratic Party leadership election
