= Kerry Pollard =

British politician

Member of Parliament for St Albans
- In office 1 May 1997 – 11 April 2005
- Preceded by: Peter Lilley
- Succeeded by: Anne Main

Personal details
- Born: 27 April 1944 (age 81)
- Party: Labour
- Spouse: Marillyn Pollard (m. 1966)
- Children: 7

Kerry Patrick Pollard (born 27 April 1944) is a Labour politician in the United Kingdom. He was elected at the general election of 1997 as Member of Parliament for St Albans, and held the seat until his defeat at the general election of 2005.

== Early life ==
Pollard was brought up in Rochdale. He attended the Catholic Thornleigh Salesian College in Astley Bridge, Bolton. He has an Open University Bachelor of Arts degree in industrial relations and urban regeneration.

== Before Parliament ==
Pollard was a Housing Association director, interested in social justice and social inclusion. He finished in third place in what would mark his first attempt to be elected as the MP for the constituency of St Albans at the general election of 1992. From 1962 to 1992, Pollard was a Chemical Engineer for British Gas plc. He was subsequently Chief Executive of Cherry Tree Housing Association from 1992 to 1997. Since 1984, he has been a magistrate.

In 1982, he became a councillor on St Albans District Council, where he remained until 1997. He was also a councillor on Hertfordshire County Council from 1989 to 1997.

== Parliamentary career ==
Kerry Pollard raised an early day motion in the House of Commons on Monday 19 April 1999, in support of Bradford & Bingley Building Society's fight to stay mutual. He urged Bradford & Bingley members to vote against moves to force Britain's second largest building society to convert to a bank, saying "the early day motion will express the fear that were Bradford & Bingley Building Society to become a bank, the entire building society movement will be damaged directly."

In the United Kingdom Parliament, Pollard opposed the wars led by the United States in Kosovo, Iraq and Afghanistan, but his most consistent aberrations from the party instructions were over benefits – he voted on several occasions against cuts in state benefits. Pollard chaired the all party small business group.

A Christian socialist, Pollard took a conservative line on questions of personal morality: he was a member of the all party anti-abortion group, and was one of a handful of Labour MPs to oppose the equalisation of the age of consent. As an MP, he appeared on former BBC day time chat show Kilroy, contributing to topics such as the problem of personal debt, with comments including "Surely the banks have some sort of responsibility?".

== After Parliament ==
Kerry Pollard joined the management board of Ridgehill Housing Association in 2005, rising to become, upon merging with William Sutton Housing Association, the chair of William Sutton Homes. Following the merger of the William Sutton Group and Affinity Homes Group on 1 October 2006, Pollard was removed as chair of William Sutton Homes on 25 April 2007, after he had complained to the Housing Association about the behaviour of the new parent company.

Pollard chaired the Labour Housing Group until 2016.

=== Further election attempts ===
In the 2015 general election, Pollard stood again as the Labour Party candidate for the St. Albans constituency. He polled second with 23%, below the Conservative Party candidate and incumbent Anne Main, who unseated him in 2005, with 47%.

A second attempt in the 2017 general election saw Pollard fare worse; the Labour Party retained 23% of the vote, but fell to third place behind Liberal Democrat candidate Daisy Cooper (who would be elected to the seat in 2019) with 32%, and the incumbent Main at 43%.

== Personal life ==
He married Maralyn Murphy in 1966, and they have five sons and two daughters. They have lived in St Albans since 1969.

Parliament of the United Kingdom
Preceded by Peter Lilley	Member of Parliament for St Albans; 1997–2005	Succeeded by Anne Main
