= 2023 Lewes District Council election =

2023 English local government election

- 4 May 2023

All 41 seats to Lewes District Council 21 seats needed for a majority
	First party	Second party	Third party
Leader	Zoe Nicholson	James MacCleary	Chris Collier
Party	Green	Liberal Democrats	Labour
Last election	9 seats, 27.9%	8 seats, 22.5%	3 seats, 10.5%
Seats before	8	9	4
Seats won	17	15	9
Seat change	▲8	▲7	▲6
Popular vote	19,991	17,610	10,522
Percentage	31.8%	28.0%	16.7%
Swing	▲3.9%	▲5.5%	▲6.2%
	Fourth party	Fifth party
Leader	Isabelle Linington (defeated)
Party	Conservative	Independent
Last election	19 seats, 27.1%	2 seats, 10.1%
Seats before	18	1
Seats won	0	0
Seat change	▼18	▼2
Popular vote	13,893	776
Percentage	22.1%	1.2%
Swing	▼5.0%	▼8.9%
- Winner of each seat at the 2023 Lewes District Council election.
Leader before election
James MacCleary
Liberal Democrats
No overall control (Note: Liberal Democrats–Green–Labour–Independent coalition.)
Leader after election
Zoe Nicholson
Green
No overall control (Note: Green–Labour coalition.)

The 2023 Lewes District Council election took place on 4 May 2023 to elect members of Lewes District Council in East Sussex, England. This was on the same day as other local elections in England.

Prior to the election the council was under no overall control, being run by a "co-operative alliance" comprising the Liberal Democrat, Green and Labour groups and one independent councillor, with the Liberal Democrat and Green leaders taking turns to be leader of the council in alternate years. The Conservatives, with 18 councillors, were the largest individual party and formed the council's opposition.

The election saw the Conservatives lose all their seats. The Greens, Liberal Democrats and Labour all made significant gains, with the Greens becoming the largest party. Following the election the Greens and Labour formed an alliance to run the council, with the Liberal Democrats taking the scrutiny roles as the opposition.

== Summary ==
=== Election result ===
2023 Lewes District Council election
Party	Candidates	Seats	Gains	Losses	Net gain/loss	Seats %	Votes %	Votes	+/−
Green	41	17	9	1	▲8	41.5	31.8	19,991	+3.9
Liberal Democrats	41	15	7	0	▲7	36.6	28.0	17,610	+5.5
Labour	20	9	6	0	▲6	22.0	16.7	10,522	+6.2
Conservative	35	0	0	19	▼19	0.0	22.1	13,893	–5.0
Independent	5	0	0	2	▼2	0.0	1.2	776	–8.9
Reform	1	0	0	0	Steady	0.0	0.2	129	N/A

== Ward results ==
The Statement of Persons Nominated, which details the candidates standing in each ward, was released by Lewes District Council following the close of nominations on 5 April 2023. The results for each ward were:

=== Chailey, Barcombe & Hamsey ===
Chailey, Barcombe & Hamsey (2 seats)
Party	Candidate	Votes	%	±%
Green	Joa Saunders	990	53.7	+30.7
Green	Mark Slater	914	49.6	+27.7
Conservative	Sharon Davy*	686	37.2	–8.0
Conservative	Isabelle Linington*	640	34.7	–6.2
Liberal Democrats	Marion Hughes	247	13.4	–11.5
Liberal Democrats	Peter Spain	212	11.5	–10.3
Turnout				
Rejected ballots		8		
Green gain from Conservative				
Green gain from Conservative				

=== Ditchling & Westmeston ===
Ditchling & Westmeston
Party	Candidate	Votes	%	±%
Liberal Democrats	Paul Mellor	377	34.3	–5.8
Green	Edward Elford	365	33.2	+20.8
Conservative	Alan Jones	356	32.4	–15.3
Majority		12	1.1	N/A
Turnout		1,098		
Rejected ballots		4	0.4	
Liberal Democrats gain from Conservative		Swing	▼13.3	

=== East Saltdean & Telscombe Cliffs ===
East Saltdean & Telscombe Cliffs (3 seats)
Party	Candidate	Votes	%	±%
Labour	Christine Robinson*	1,132	69.9	+32.5
Labour	Laurence O'Connor*	1,089	67.3	+33.0
Labour	Ian Alexander	1,087	67.2	N/A
Conservative	Paul Clark	538	33.2	–2.3
Liberal Democrats	Simon Ackroyd	328	20.3	+5.3
Liberal Democrats	Liz Lee	180	11.1	N/A
Green	Nicky Blackwell	151	9.3	–20.2
Liberal Democrats	Donna Martinez-Claras	132	8.2	N/A
Green	Nick Tigg	112	6.9	N/A
Green	Diana Wilkins	106	6.5	N/A
Turnout				
Rejected ballots		12		
Labour hold				
Labour hold				
Labour gain from Conservative				

=== Kingston ===
Kingston
Party	Candidate	Votes	%	±%
Liberal Democrats	Stella Spiteri	431	47.5	–4.3
Green	David Hoare	326	35.9	+18.1
Conservative	Rosemarie Jeffery	150	16.5	–6.8
Majority		105	11.6	–16.8
Turnout		907		
Rejected ballots		7	0.8	
Liberal Democrats hold		Swing	▼11.2	

=== Lewes Bridge ===
Lewes Bridge (2 seats)
Party	Candidate	Votes	%	±%
Green	Zoe Nicholson*	916	49.3	–0.7
Liberal Democrats	Janet Baah	812	43.7	+4.2
Green	Adrian Ross*	794	42.7	–0.9
Liberal Democrats	Jeremy Halley	491	26.4	–6.4
Labour	Matt Kent	246	13.2	+1.6
Conservative	Colin French	168	9.0	+0.1
Labour	Amy Wilkins	147	7.9	–1.5
Conservative	Catharine Robinson	144	7.7	–0.5
Turnout				
Rejected ballots		9		
Green hold				
Liberal Democrats gain from Green				

=== Lewes Castle ===
Lewes Castle (2 seats)
Party	Candidate	Votes	%	±%
Green	Wendy Maples	696	47.8	+5.4
Green	Nicolas Kortalla-Bird	600	41.2	+3.5
Labour	Emily Clarke	572	39.3	+14.4
Labour	Stephen Catlin	356	24.5	+11.4
Liberal Democrats	Kate Wood	236	16.2	–16.3
Liberal Democrats	Tony Parker	229	15.7	–13.7
Conservative	Diane Burman	122	8.4	+2.2
Conservative	Karen French	99	6.8	+0.7
Turnout				
Rejected ballots		9		
Green hold				
Green hold				

=== Lewes Priory ===
Lewes Priory (3 seats)
Party	Candidate	Votes	%	±%
Green	Imogen Makepeace*	1,727	54.7	+13.4
Green	Graham Clews	1,457	46.2	+8.6
Green	Paul Keene	1,420	45.0	+14.0
Liberal Democrats	Kevin West	981	31.1	+14.0
Liberal Democrats	Paddy Henshaw	927	29.4	+15.0
Liberal Democrats	Edwina Livesey	870	27.6	+15.6
Labour	Linda Drabble	550	17.4	+10.9
Labour	Peter Hambly	515	16.3	+9.9
Labour	Danny Sweeney	423	13.4	+7.3
Conservative	Catherine Boorman	318	10.1	+6.1
Conservative	Elizabeth Slater	283	9.0	+5.3
Turnout				
Rejected ballots		15		
Green hold				
Green gain from Independent				
Green hold				

=== Newhaven North ===
Newhaven North (2 seats)
Party	Candidate	Votes	%	±%
Liberal Democrats	Julie Carr*	628	58.7	+31.1
Liberal Democrats	Sean Macleod	589	55.0	+30.1
Independent	Steve Saunders*	348	32.5	–2.4
Conservative	Susan Chowen	245	22.9	–1.0
Independent	Andrew Winter	171	15.2	N/A
Green	Tai Ray-Jones	96	9.0	–1.5
Green	Dirk Campbell	64	6.0	–3.8
Turnout				
Rejected ballots		13		
Liberal Democrats hold				
Liberal Democrats gain from Independent				

=== Newhaven South ===
Newhaven South (3 seats)
Party	Candidate	Votes	%	±%
Liberal Democrats	Graham Amy*	766	58.3	+4.2
Liberal Democrats	James MacCleary*	672	51.2	+7.3
Liberal Democrats	Christoph Von Kurthy*	611	46.5	+1.2
Independent	Pinky McLean-Knight	387	29.5	N/A
Conservative	Bill Giles	338	25.7	+6.9
Conservative	Linda Wallraven	263	20.0	+4.5
Conservative	Abdul Ahmed	239	18.2	+2.9
Green	Holly Atkins	216	16.5	–2.0
Independent	Nick Jones	189	14.4	N/A
Green	Martin Meadows	140	10.7	–7.4
Green	Martin O'Brien	118	9.0	–6.1
Turnout				
Rejected ballots		17		
Liberal Democrats hold				
Liberal Democrats hold				
Liberal Democrats hold				

=== Newick ===
Newick
Party	Candidate	Votes	%	±%
Green	Charlotte Keenan	533	56.5	+39.1
Conservative	Nate Delo	337	35.7	–21.3
Liberal Democrats	Samantha Robbins	73	7.7	–12.4
Majority		194	25.8	N/A
Turnout				
Rejected ballots		4		
Green gain from Conservative		Swing	▲30.2	

=== Ouse Valley & Ringmer ===
Ouse Valley & Ringmer (3 seats)
Party	Candidate	Votes	%	±%
Green	Johnny Denis*	1,263	57.1	–6.2
Green	Emily O'Brien*	1,213	54.8	+5.1
Green	Lucy Agace	1,042	47.1	+2.3
Conservative	Richard Turner	697	31.5	+8.8
Conservative	Matthew Crisp	659	29.8	+7.1
Conservative	Katie Sanderson	595	26.9	+5.1
Liberal Democrats	Victoria Vincent	420	19.0	–7.2
Liberal Democrats	Cathy Bryan	383	17.3	–4.7
Liberal Democrats	Lindsey Macleod	367	16.6	–6.2
Turnout				
Rejected ballots		8		
Green hold				
Green hold				
Green hold				

=== Peacehaven East ===
Peacehaven East (2 seats)
Party	Candidate	Votes	%	±%
Labour	Paul Davies	620	58.4	+21.3
Labour	Cathy Gallagher	537	50.6	+18.0
Conservative	Nigel Enever	399	37.6	–4.5
Conservative	Tara Moore	324	30.5	–4.2
Liberal Democrats	Emily Kramers	73	6.9	N/A
Green	Lesley Orr	65	6.1	–12.3
Liberal Democrats	Helena Pickup	61	5.7	N/A
Green	Anthony Shuster	43	4.1	–12.1
Turnout				
Rejected ballots		4		
Labour gain from Conservative				
Labour hold				

=== Peacehaven North ===
Peacehaven North (2 seats)
Party	Candidate	Votes	%	±%
Labour	Ciarron Clarkson*	555	52.0	+24.1
Labour	Isobel Sharkey	553	51.8	N/A
Conservative	Keira O'Neill*	409	38.3	–6.6
Conservative	Andy Smith	389	36.4	–9.1
Liberal Democrats	Joyce Bell	65	6.1	N/A
Green	Liz Mansfield	60	5.6	–15.2
Green	Rikki Begley	56	5.2	–10.6
Liberal Democrats	David Stechler	49	4.6	N/A
Turnout				
Rejected ballots		7		
Labour gain from Conservative				
Labour gain from Conservative				

=== Peacehaven West ===
Peacehaven West (2 seats)
Party	Candidate	Votes	%	±%
Labour	Chris Collier*	689	72.6	N/A
Labour	Nikki Fabry	557	58.7	N/A
Conservative	Keiran Sefton	390	41.1	+6.1
Liberal Democrats	Liz Webb	100	10.5	–11.8
Green	Emily Slater	71	7.5	–16.1
Liberal Democrats	Fawzia Whittuck	46	4.8	N/A
Green	Debra Vice-Holt	44	4.6	–12.9
Turnout				
Rejected ballots		1		
Labour gain from Conservative				
Labour gain from Conservative				

=== Plumpton, Streat, East Chiltington & St John (Without) ===
Plumpton, Streat, East Chiltington & St John (Without)
Party	Candidate	Votes	%	±%
Liberal Democrats	Daniel Stewart-Roberts	601	66.6	+0.8
Conservative	Tam Large	208	23.1	+0.2
Green	John Oughton	93	10.3	+1.9
Majority		393	43.5	+0.6
Turnout		902		
Rejected ballots		6	0.7	
Liberal Democrats hold		Swing	▲0.3	

=== Seaford Central ===
Seaford Central (2 seats)
Party	Candidate	Votes	%	±%
Liberal Democrats	Stephen Gauntlett*	632	50.1	+4.1
Liberal Democrats	Freddie Hoareau	523	41.5	N/A
Conservative	Geoff Rutland*	411	32.6	–2.2
Labour	Elaine Sammarco	297	23.6	–6.1
Labour	Christopher Purser	276	21.9	N/A
Green	Alice McCarthy Sommerville	188	14.9	–2.6
Green	Roy Francomb	185	14.7	–1.6
Turnout				
Rejected ballots		13		
Liberal Democrats hold				
Liberal Democrats gain from Conservative				

=== Seaford East ===
Seaford East (2 seats)
Party	Candidate	Votes	%	±%
Green	Becky Francomb	774	44.8	+19.5
Green	Ezra Cohen	764	44.3	+25.3
Conservative	Sam Adenji*	695	40.3	–6.3
Conservative	Julian Peterson*	583	33.8	–11.4
Liberal Democrats	Lindsay Stirton	225	13.0	N/A
Liberal Democrats	Maggie Wearmouth	215	12.5	N/A
Reform	Alan Latham	129	7.5	N/A
Independent	Lorraine Crawley	68	3.9	N/A
Turnout				
Rejected ballots		7		
Green gain from Conservative				
Green gain from Conservative				

=== Seaford North ===
Seaford North (2 seats)
Party	Candidate	Votes	%	±%
Green	James Meek	584	41.9	+16.4
Green	Roy Clay	566	40.6	+26.6
Conservative	James Lord*	414	29.7	–12.0
Liberal Democrats	Morag Everden	409	29.4	–3.7
Conservative	Sylvia Lord*	409	29.4	–9.6
Liberal Democrats	Sally Markwell	404	29.0	–2.5
Turnout				
Rejected ballots		25		
Green gain from Conservative				
Green gain from Conservative				

=== Seaford South ===
Seaford South (2 seats)
Party	Candidate	Votes	%	±%
Liberal Democrats	Christine Brett*	799	55.5	+13.5
Liberal Democrats	Olivia Honeyman	760	52.8	+11.3
Conservative	Mark Brown	422	29.3	–13.4
Conservative	Melvyn Simmons	349	24.2	–11.3
Green	Miranda Suheimat	218	15.1	+2.1
Labour Co-op	Alun Tlusty-Sheen	182	12.6	–2.3
Green	Rachel Fryer	150	10.4	–2.1
Turnout				
Rejected ballots		17		
Liberal Democrats hold				
Liberal Democrats gain from Conservative				

=== Seaford West ===
Seaford West (2 seats)
Party	Candidate	Votes	%	±%
Liberal Democrats	Christina Bristow	851	50.6	N/A
Liberal Democrats	Lesley Boniface	733	43.6	N/A
Conservative	Liz Boorman*	663	39.4	–15.6
Conservative	Bill Payne	606	36.0	–20.4
Green	Robert Burns	219	13.0	–28.5
Green	Gemma McFarlane	155	9.2	–17.6
Labour	Martin Waite	139	8.3	–15.3
Turnout				
Rejected ballots		11		
Liberal Democrats gain from Conservative				
Liberal Democrats gain from Conservative				

=== Wivelsfield ===
Wivelsfield
Party	Candidate	Votes	%	±%
Green	William Coupland	497	52.6	+35.1
Conservative	Nancy Bikson*	345	36.5	–19.9
Liberal Democrats	Julie Salmon	102	10.8	–15.3
Majority		152	16.1	N/A
Turnout		944		
Rejected ballots		3	0.3	
Green gain from Conservative		Swing	▲27.5	

== Changes 2023–2027 ==
- Imogen Makepeace, elected for the Greens, left the party to sit as an independent in April 2024.
- Ciarron Clarkson, elected for Labour, left the party to sit as an independent in June 2024.

=== By-elections ===
==== Wivelsfield ====
Wivelsfield: 10 October 2024
Party	Candidate	Votes	%	±%
Green	Sue Morris	315	42.3	▼10.3
Liberal Democrats	Nadine Stothard	216	29.0	▲18.2
Conservative	Sarah Webster	213	28.6	▼7.9
Majority		99	13.3	▼2.8
Turnout		744	32.7	
Rejected ballots		1	0.1	
Green hold		Swing	▼14.3	

The by-election was triggered by the resignation of Green councillor William Coupland after he suffered a stroke.

==== Newhaven North ====
Newhaven North by-election, 29 May 2025
Party	Candidate	Votes	%	±%
Liberal Democrats	Corinna Watts	697	51.7	▲4.1
Reform	Bill Payne	389	28.9	N/A
Green	David Hoare	122	9.1	▲1.8
Conservative	Richard Turner	59	4.4	▼14.8
Independent	Steve Saunders	57	4.2	▼22.2
Labour	Linda Drabble	23	1.7	N/A
Majority		308	22.8	
Turnout		1,347	34.1	
Liberal Democrats hold		Swing		

The by-election was triggered by the resignation of Liberal Democrat councillor Sean Macleod, who had first been elected to the council for Ouse Valley & Ringmer in 2019 before winning the Newhaven North seat in 2023. Macleod said he had recently been appointed to a new job that would leave him unable to give the role of councillor the attention it deserved.

==== Newhaven South ====
Newhaven South by-election, 7 May 2026
Party	Candidate	Votes	%	±%
Liberal Democrats	James Harrison	1,105	52.2	
Liberal Democrats	Jo Pettitt	1,059	50.1	
Reform	Archie Wilson	550	26.0	
Reform	Bill Payne	474	22.4	
Green	Scott Burrell	261	12.3	
Green	Tai Ray-Jones	232	11.0	
Conservative	Catherine Boorman	151	7.1	
Conservative	Richard Turner	108	5.1	
Labour	Joe Moughrabi	102	4.8	
Turnout		2,123	38.4	
Rejected ballots		8		
Registered electors		5,530		
Liberal Democrats hold		Swing		
Liberal Democrats hold		Swing		

This double vacancy was triggered by the resignations of two of the ward's three Liberal Democrat councillors: James MacCleary, who had been elected as MP for Lewes in July 2024, and Christoph von Kurthy.
