= 2020 Liberal Democrats deputy leadership election =

- 13 September 2020
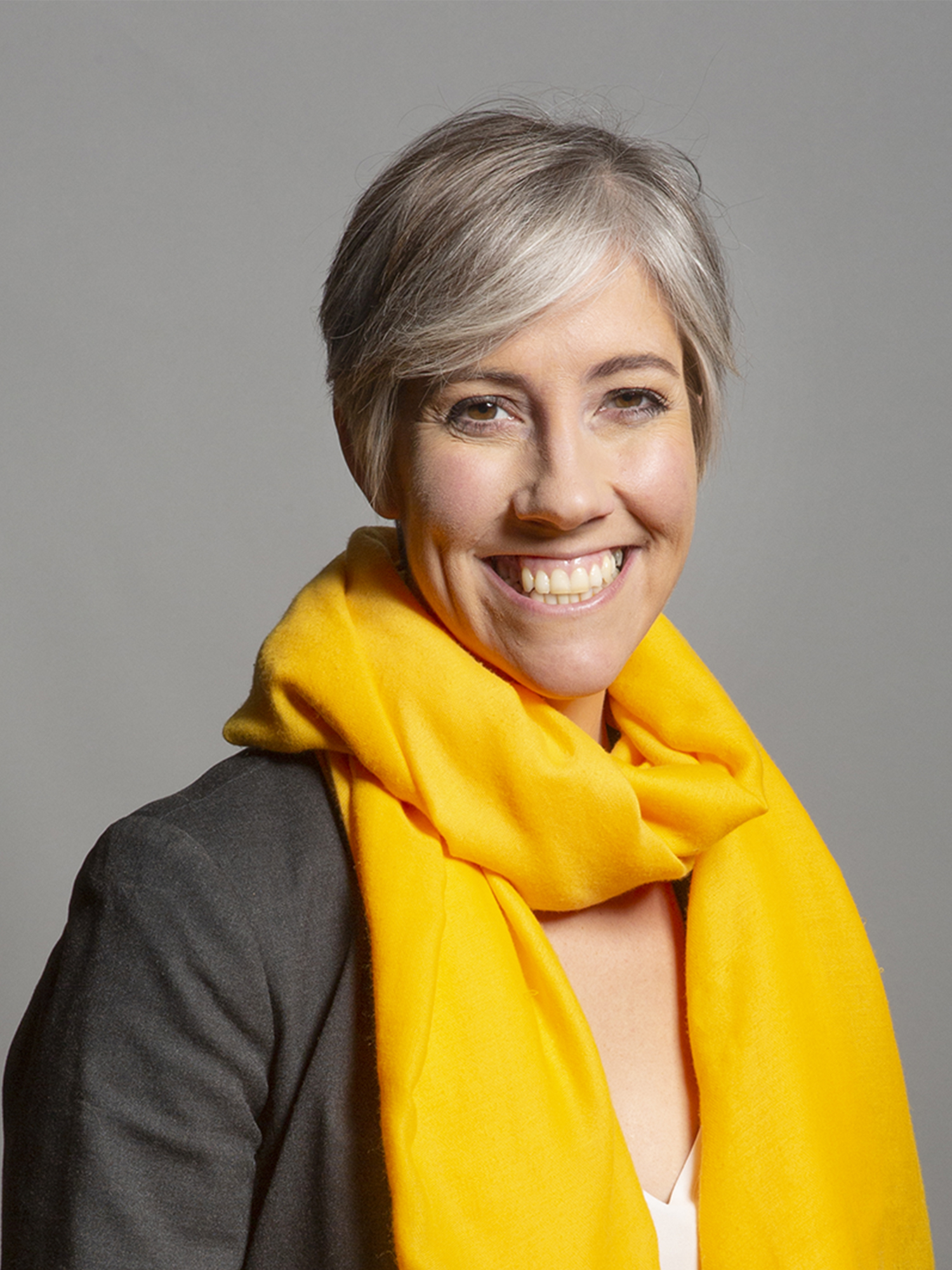
Candidate	Daisy Cooper
Popular vote	Unopposed
Deputy Leader before election
Ed Davey
Elected Deputy Leader
Daisy Cooper

The 2020 Liberal Democrats deputy leadership election was held in September 2020. It followed the election of the incumbent deputy leader Ed Davey as party leader in August 2020.

== Election rules ==
Unlike the party leader, there is no official position of deputy leader within the party's constitution. A deputy leader of the Liberal Democrats group in the House of Commons can be elected by a ballot of sitting Liberal Democrat MPs.

== Results ==
The result was announced on 13 September 2020 with Daisy Cooper elected as deputy leader.
