= Anne Main =

British politician (born 1957)

Anne Main CBE
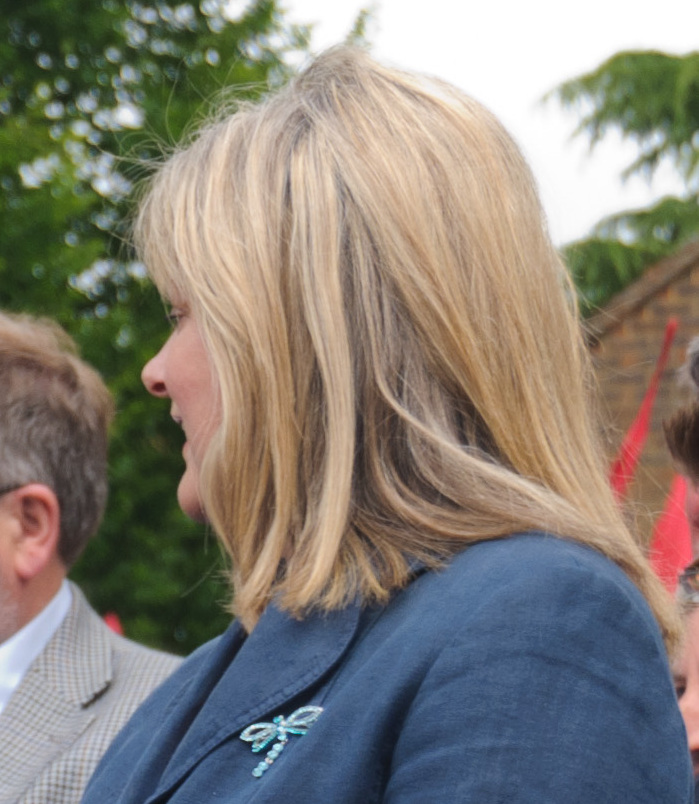
- Main in 2010

Member of Parliament for St Albans
- In office 5 May 2005 – 6 November 2019
- Preceded by: Kerry Pollard
- Succeeded by: Daisy Cooper

Personal details
- Born: 17 May 1957 (age 69) Cardiff, Glamorgan, Wales
- Party: Conservative
- Spouses: Stephen Tonks (m. 1978); Andrew Main (m. 1995)
- Children: 4
- Education: Swansea University; University of Sheffield

Anne Margaret Main (born 17 May 1957) is a Conservative Party politician who formerly served as the Member of Parliament for St Albans in Hertfordshire. She was elected at the general election of 2005, and was re-elected in 2010, 2015 and 2017. She lost her seat to Daisy Cooper, a Liberal Democrat, at the 2019 general election.

== Early life ==
Main was born in Cardiff, Wales in 1957. She was state-educated at the Bishop of Llandaff Church in Wales High School in Rookwood Close in Llandaff, Cardiff. She read English at Swansea University obtaining a BA Hons, where she met her first husband, Stephen. She then obtained a PGCE from the University of Sheffield. She moved to the London area, and taught English and drama at an inner London comprehensive school.

== Political career ==
Main's political career began in 1999, when she was elected as a town councillor in Beaconsfield in Buckinghamshire. She served as councillor for Beaconsfield South Ward on South Bucks District Council from 2001 to 2005.

At the 2005 general election, she was elected as the Member of Parliament for St Albans, defeating the sitting Labour MP Kerry Pollard, achieving a 6.6% swing.

In November 2005, Main endorsed David Cameron in the Conservative Party leadership election, after originally supporting his rival David Davis.

At the general election of 2010 she retained her seat with an increased majority, despite a 3.75% swing to the Liberal Democrats. She then increased her majority in 2015 to 12,732 votes, picking up some votes from the Liberal Democrats as part of the collapse of that party's support nationwide.

At the snap general election of 2017, Main received 43% of the vote, Daisy Cooper (Liberal Democrat) received 32%, Kerry Pollard (Labour) received 23% and Jack Easton (Green Party) received 2%. UKIP declined to stand a candidate in recognition of Main's eurosceptic views. She became Chair of the All-Party Parliamentary Group (APPG) on Bangladesh, and served on a number of Select Committees; in addition she became a member of the Panel of Chairs. At the 2016 EU Referendum, Main campaigned for a "Leave" vote.

Main largely voted in accordance with her party, but opposed high-speed rail and same-sex marriage in the United Kingdom.

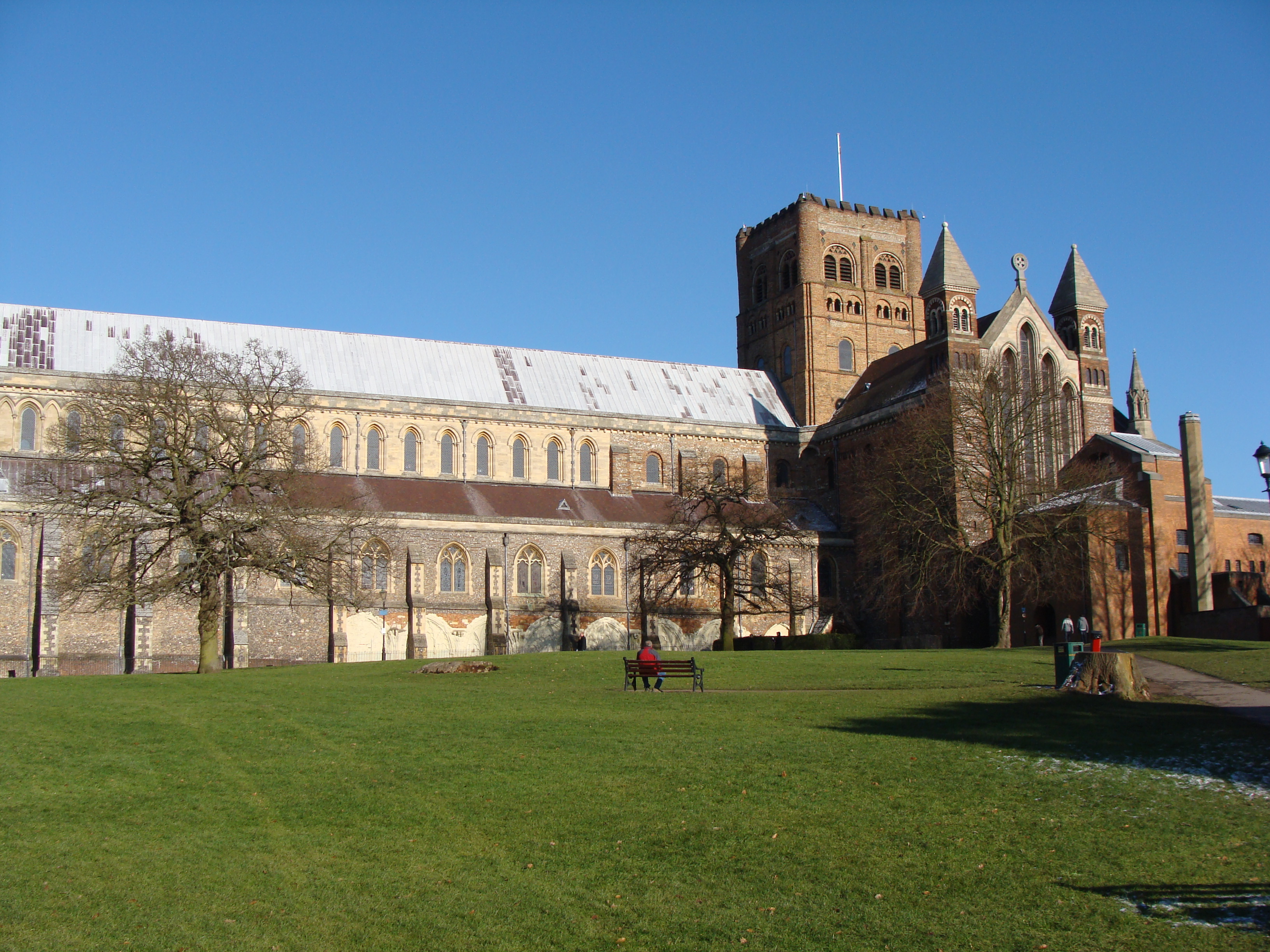
Anne Main was the MP for St Albans from 2005 to 2019

Against the national swing, she lost her seat to the Liberal Democrat candidate Daisy Cooper at the 2019 general election.

Main was appointed Commander of the Order of the British Empire (CBE) in the 2020 Birthday Honours for public and parliamentary service.

== Career as a novelist ==
Main commenced a career as a novelist after the end of her political career, and by May 2025 had published twelve novels about life in South Wales, UK set around the middle of the twentieth century.

== Expenses ==
Main was investigated by The Daily Telegraph in May 2009 for claiming a second home allowance and a council tax discount for an apartment for a constituency home, which was also lived in full-time and rent-free by her daughter. On 26 June 2009, it was reported that she would face a Parliamentary inquiry into these allegations under John Lyon, the Parliamentary Commissioner for Standards, following a formal complaint thought to be from a constituent.

In February 2010, Lyon concluded that the public should not have been expected to meet living costs for Main's daughter, and Main was ordered to repay £7,100 (being £2,100 wrongly claimed for food, along with an additional £5,000 to reflect the daughter's use of the flat), and to provide a written apology to the committee. Main had argued the Fees Office had told her it was permissible for her daughter to share the second home.

Main claimed £22,000 a year for a second home, despite being able to commute both from her taxpayer-funded flat in St Albans, 26 miles from Westminster, or from her family house in Beaconsfield, 31 miles from Westminster.

Concerns raised in connection with her parliamentary expenses resulted in an attempt by the local St Albans Conservative Association to deselect her, with a local party vote led by the association's chairwoman, Seema Kennedy, a future Member of Parliament who served as the Parliamentary Under-Secretary of State for Immigration under Boris Johnson. On 13 August 2009, the local association voted by a large margin (140 to 20 according to some sources) to retain Main as its candidate for the forthcoming general election, which had to be held before 3 June 2010.

== Personal life ==
Main lives with her family in Bourne End. She married her first husband Stephen Tonks in 1978, and they had a son and two daughters. Stephen Tonks died of cancer aged 34. In 1995 she married Andrew Main, a company director, with whom she had a fourth child.

Parliament of the United Kingdom
Preceded by Kerry Pollard	Member of Parliament for St Albans; 2005–2019	Succeeded by Daisy Cooper
