= 2015 Lewes District Council election =

2015 UK local government election

← 2011	7 May 2015	2019 →

All 41 seats to Lewes District Council 21 seats needed for a majority
	First party	Second party	Third party
	Con	LD	Grn
Party	Conservative	Liberal Democrats	Green
Last election	22 seats, 37.8%	18 seats, 33.7%	0 seats, 7.6%
Seats won	24	11	3
Seat change	▲2	▼7	▲3
Popular vote	35,938	24,817	10,955
Percentage	34.5%	23.8%	10.5%
Swing	▼3.3%	▼9.9%	▲2.9%
	Fourth party	Fifth party
	Ind	UKIP
Party	Independent	UKIP
Last election	1 seat, 4.8%	0 seats, 3.1%
Seats won	2	1
Seat change	▲1	▲1
Popular vote	6,805	14,137
Percentage	6.5%	13.6%
Swing	▲1.7%	▲10.5%
- Results of the 2015 Lewes District Council election
Council control before election
Conservative
Council control after election
Conservative

The 2015 Lewes District Council election took place on 7 May 2015 to elect members of Lewes District Council in England. This was on the same day as other local elections.

== Results summary ==
Lewes District Council election, 2015
Party	Candidates						Votes		
Party	Stood	Elected	Gained	Unseated	Net	% of total	%	No.	Net %
Conservative	39	24	3	1	▲2	58.5%	34.5%	35,938	▼3.3%
Liberal Democrats	36	11	1	8	▼7	26.8%	23.8%	24,817	▼9.9%
Green	26	3	3	0	▲3	7.3%	10.5%	10,955	▲2.9%
Independent	9	2	1	0	▲1	4.9%	6.5%	6,805	▲1.7%
UKIP	27	1	1	0	▲1	2.4%	13.6%	14,137	▲10.5%
Labour	21	0	0	0	Steady	0%	11.0%	11,479	▼1.9%

== Ward results ==
Sitting councillors are marked with an asterisk (*).

=== Barcombe & Hamsey ===
Barcombe & Hamsey
Party	Candidate	Votes	%	±%
Conservative	Isabelle Linington	511	41.3	–3.5
Liberal Democrats	Marion Joyce Hughes	492	39.8	+2.6
Green	Neil del Strother	233	18.9	+0.9
Majority		19	1.5	–6.1
Turnout				
Conservative hold		Swing		

=== Chailey & Wivelsfield ===
Chailey & Wivelsfield (2 seats)
Party	Candidate	Votes	%	±%
Conservative	Sharon Davy *	1,686	48.7	–9.2
Conservative	Cyril Sugarman *	1,169	–	
Liberal Democrats	Lesley Alison Dunford	893	25.8	+6.3
UKIP	Pascal Atkins	463	13.4	N/A
Liberal Democrats	Iantha Kirkup	444	–	
Green	Holly Atkins	417	12.1	–0.8
Turnout				
Conservative hold		Swing		
Conservative hold		Swing		

=== Ditchling & Westmeston ===
Ditchling & Westmeston
Party	Candidate	Votes	%	±%
Conservative	Tom Jones *	1,032	67.0	+7.7
Liberal Democrats	Don McBeth	259	16.8	+0.8
Green	Tom Beament	162	10.5	–14.1
Labour	Vincent Tickner	88	5.7	N/A
Majority		773	50.2	+15.5
Turnout				
Conservative hold		Swing		

=== East Saltdean & Telscombe Cliffs ===
East Saltdean & Telscombe Cliffs (3 seats)
Party	Candidate	Votes	%	±%
Conservative	Wayne Botting	1,875	43.7	–6.2
Conservative	Ron Maskell *	1,825	–	
Conservative	Andy Smith *	1,654	–	
Labour	Alan Ford	923	21.5	–2.1
Labour	Christine Robinson	875	–	
Labour	Laurence O'Connor	864	–	
UKIP	David Michael Burgess	685	16.0	N/A
UKIP	Lyn Mills	613	–	
UKIP	Josh Palmer	520	–	
Liberal Democrats	Simon Marriott Ackroyd	432	10.1	–16.5
Green	Sarah Rosalind Hitchings	378	8.8	N/A
Turnout				
Conservative hold		Swing		
Conservative hold		Swing		
Conservative hold		Swing		

=== Kingston ===
Kingston
Party	Candidate	Votes	%	±%
Liberal Democrats	Vic Ient	576	44.4	+3.0
Conservative	Nick Robinson	423	32.6	–1.7
Green	Luci McGovern	297	22.9	+11.0
Majority		153	11.8	+4.7
Turnout				
Liberal Democrats hold		Swing		

=== Lewes Bridge ===
Lewes Bridge (2 seats)
Party	Candidate	Votes	%	±%
Liberal Democrats	Daisy Cooper	905	27.5	–10.9
Green	Joanna Katherine Emma Carter	677	20.6	–9.5
Liberal Democrats	John Tregea Lamb	641	–	
Independent	Matt Kent	540	16.4	N/A
Labour	Denzil Jones	529	16.1	–0.8
Labour	Gill Short	447	–	
Green	Robert Lewis Heath	410	–	
Conservative	Brenda Gough	395	12.0	–2.6
Conservative	Frances Tufnell	359	–	
UKIP	Deborah Anna Cooke	240	7.3	N/A
Turnout				
Liberal Democrats hold		Swing		
Green gain from Liberal Democrats		Swing		

=== Lewes Castle ===
Lewes Castle (2 seats)
Party	Candidate	Votes	%	±%
Green	Susan Jean Murray	767	28.4	–1.5
Liberal Democrats	Mike Chartier *	764	28.3	–11.8
Green	Annabella Sarah Ashby	703	–	
Liberal Democrats	David Michael Gray *	612	–	
Labour	Linda Drabble	448	16.6	–1.1
Labour	Philippa Thompson	439	–	
Independent	Jacqueline Bishop	384	14.2	N/A
Conservative	Marion Fuller	336	12.4	–
Conservative	Jane Slater	273	–	
Independent	Rod Crocker	207	–	
Turnout				
Green gain from Liberal Democrats		Swing		
Liberal Democrats hold		Swing		

=== Lewes Priory ===
Lewes Priory (3 seats)
Party	Candidate	Votes	%	±%
Independent	Ruth O'Keeffe *	2,702	49.5	+3.0
Green	Tony Rowell	1,141	20.9	+7.0
Independent	Stephen Alfred Catlin	1,111	–	
Green	Imogen Makepeace	1,001	–	
Independent	Graham John Mayhew	999	–	
Green	Adam Kenneth Barker	909	–	
Labour	Louis Blair	647	11.8	+1.4
Labour	Pam Lewis	564	–	
Liberal Democrats	John Stockdale	521	9.5	–7.6
Liberal Democrats	Clive Richard Burgess	518	–	
Labour	Gaby Weiner	491	–	
Conservative	Cynthia Orwell	453	8.3	–0.8
Conservative	Roy Burman	406	–	
Liberal Democrats	Will Elliott	401	–	
Turnout				
Independent hold		Swing		
Green gain from Liberal Democrats		Swing		
Independent gain from Liberal Democrats		Swing		

=== Newhaven Denton & Meeching ===
Newhaven Denton & Meeching (3 seats)
Party	Candidate	Votes	%	±%
Liberal Democrats	Graham Roger Amy *	1,327	28.1	–17.4
Conservative	Bill Giles	1,040	22.0	–3.4
UKIP	Simon Barnes	997	21.1	N/A
Liberal Democrats	Darren Paul Grover	919	–	
Liberal Democrats	Keith Frederick Corbett	877	–	
Conservative	Amber Robertson	849	–	
UKIP	Laurence Alexander Pulling	816	–	
UKIP	Lawrence Shaun Steer	690	–	
Labour	Doug Johnson	607	12.9	–2.3
Labour	Jan Woodling	576	–	
Green	John Roderick McGarrie	413	8.8	–5.1
Independent	Rod Main *	336	7.1	N/A
Turnout				
Liberal Democrats hold		Swing		
Conservative gain from Liberal Democrats		Swing		
UKIP gain from Liberal Democrats		Swing		

=== Newhaven Valley ===
Newhaven Valley (2 seats)
Party	Candidate	Votes	%	±%
Liberal Democrats	Julie Lynn Carr *	616	36.1	–15.9
Liberal Democrats	Steve Saunders *	604	–	
Conservative	Tony Bradbury	468	27.4	+0.2
UKIP	Terence John Kelly	437	25.6	+4.8
UKIP	George Robert Cork	397	–	
Conservative	Melvyn Simmons	322	–	
Green	Amy Macconnachie	184	10.8	N/A
Turnout				
Liberal Democrats hold		Swing		
Liberal Democrats hold		Swing		

=== Newick ===
Newick
Party	Candidate	Votes	%	±%
Conservative	Jim Sheppard *	1,019	65.2	–
Liberal Democrats	Peter Edward Spain	419	26.8	+14.1
Green	Anthony Shuster	125	8.0	+1.6
Majority		600	38.4	–11.1
Turnout				
Conservative hold		Swing		

=== Ouse Valley & Ringmer ===
Ouse Valley & Ringmer (3 seats)
Party	Candidate	Votes	%	±%
Liberal Democrats	Peter Frederick Gardiner *	1,535	29.2	–4.1
Conservative	Paul Gander *	1,526	29.0	–1.6
Conservative	Richard John Turner	1,230	–	
Liberal Democrats	Charlie Carr	1,186	–	
Liberal Democrats	Pat Ost	1,048	–	
Conservative	Alan Lawson Scott	965	–	
Green	Johnny Denis	864	16.4	+0.4
UKIP	Ian Wilson	696	13.2	+4.9
Labour	Peter Stephen Hambly	641	12.2	+0.4
Turnout				
Liberal Democrats hold		Swing		
Conservative hold		Swing		
Conservative gain from Liberal Democrats		Swing		

=== Peacehaven East ===
Peacehaven East (2 seats)
Party	Candidate	Votes	%	±%
Conservative	Nigel Enever	1,116	41.5	–16.1
Conservative	Jackie Harrison-Hicks *	1,082	–	
Labour	Nicky Easton	628	23.4	–8.5
UKIP	Phil Howson *	621	23.1	N/A
UKIP	Su Bratchie	590	–	
Labour	Rotney O'Shea	479	–	
Green	Fraser Colin Addecott	176	6.6	N/A
Liberal Democrats	Wilma Joyce Shaw	146	5.4	–5.2
Turnout				
Conservative hold		Swing		
Conservative hold		Swing		

=== Peacehaven North ===
Peacehaven North (2 seats)
Party	Candidate	Votes	%	±%
Conservative	Andy Loraine	1,024	40.1	–0.9
Conservative	Elayne Merry *	845	–	
Labour	Ann Harrison	516	20.2	–0.5
UKIP	Brian William Griffiths	466	18.2	N/A
UKIP	Clive Rowland Hickman	394	–	
Independent	Sue Griffiths	196	7.7	N/A
Liberal Democrats	Roger John Leach	178	7.0	–13.1
Green	Tobias Benedict Eoghan Madden	175	6.8	N/A
Turnout				
Conservative hold		Swing		
Conservative hold		Swing		

=== Peacehaven West ===
Peacehaven West (2 seats)
Party	Candidate	Votes	%	±%
Conservative	Dave Neave	1,030	39.5	–18.1
Conservative	Robbie Robertson *	845	–	
UKIP	Ian Verdun Buchanan	590	22.6	N/A
Labour	Richard Collings	567	21.8	–7.4
UKIP	Kit Griffiths	448	–	
Green	Antonia Thornhill Madden	215	8.3	N/A
Liberal Democrats	Jane Scott	203	7.8	–5.4
Turnout				
Conservative hold		Swing		
Conservative hold		Swing		

=== Plumpton, Streat, East Chiltington & St John (Without) ===
Plumpton, Streat, East Chiltington & St John (Without)
Party	Candidate	Votes	%	±%
Liberal Democrats	Sarah Jane Osborne *	607	44.2	–7.2
Conservative	Nancy Bikson	565	41.1	–0.2
Green	Daniel Charles Antony Renton	202	14.7	N/A
Majority		42	3.1	–7.1
Turnout		949		
Liberal Democrats hold		Swing		

=== Seaford Central ===
Seaford Central (2 seats)
Party	Candidate	Votes	%	±%
Conservative	Bill Bovington	936	30.7	+7.2
Liberal Democrats	Stephen John Gauntlett *	821	26.9	–2.9
Liberal Democrats	Rahnuma Hayder	632	–	
Conservative	Bill Webb	605	–	
UKIP	Terry Goodman	504	16.5	+7.2
Labour	Penny Lower	458	15.0	+5.1
UKIP	Eric Charles Woodward	350	–	
Green	Lesley Barnes Orr	334	10.9	+2.2
Turnout				
Conservative gain from Liberal Democrats		Swing		
Liberal Democrats hold		Swing		

=== Seaford East ===
Seaford East (2 seats)
Party	Candidate	Votes	%	±%
Conservative	Tony Nicholson *	1,018	30.9	–12.3
Conservative	Julian Peterson	838	–	
Liberal Democrats	Stefano Diella	789	24.0	–6.0
UKIP	Alan Norman Latham	667	20.3	+4.7
Liberal Democrats	Michael Milton Gaze	619	–	
UKIP	Peter Michael Leeming	571	–	
Independent	Phil Boorman	330	10.0	N/A
Labour	Mathew Paul Basford	301	9.1	–2.0
Green	Nicola McGilligan	186	5.7	N/A
Green	Roger Murray	116	–	
Turnout				
Conservative hold		Swing		
Conservative hold		Swing		

=== Seaford North ===
Seaford North (2 seats)
Party	Candidate	Votes	%	±%
Conservative	Paul Franklin *	1,012	32.4	–2.8
Liberal Democrats	Alex Lambert	941	30.2	+2.5
Conservative	David Neech	833	–	
Liberal Democrats	Adam McLean	809	–	
UKIP	Gill Hart	505	16.2	+5.3
UKIP	Deborah Anne Holt	401	–	
Labour	Elaine Sammarco	391	12.5	–1.5
Green	George Stephen Briley	272	8.7	N/A
Turnout				
Conservative hold		Swing		
Liberal Democrats gain from Conservative		Swing		

=== Seaford South ===
Seaford South (2 seats)
Party	Candidate	Votes	%	±%
Conservative	Sam Adeniji *	1,148	41.0	+3.8
Liberal Democrats	Olivia Honeyman	856	30.6	–8.2
Conservative	Rob Chambers	853	–	
Liberal Democrats	Ian Martin Cairns	789	–	
UKIP	Rita Mary Boswell	434	15.5	+4.3
Green	Guy McQueen	362	12.9	N/A
UKIP	Alyssa Roberts	74	–	
Turnout				
Conservative hold		Swing		
Liberal Democrats hold		Swing		

=== Seaford West ===
Seaford West (2 seats)
Party	Candidate	Votes	%	±%
Conservative	Rob Blackman	1,252	45.2	+5.2
Conservative	Linda Wallraven	1,122	–	
Liberal Democrats	Richard Neil Honeyman	752	27.1	–7.3
Liberal Democrats	Cheryl Lesley White	686	–	
UKIP	Linda Christine Lord	531	19.2	+2.9
UKIP	Peter Albert Charlton	437	–	
Green	Michael McCoy	236	8.5	N/A
Turnout				
Conservative hold		Swing		
Conservative hold		Swing		
