= 2019 Lewes District Council election =

2019 UK local government election

- 2 May 2019

All 41 seats to Lewes District Council 21 seats needed for a majority

	First party	Second party	Third party
Party	Conservative	Green	Liberal Democrats
Last election	24 seats, 34.5%	3 seats, 10.5%	11 seats, 23.8%
Seats won	19	9	8
Seat change	▼5	▲6	▼3
Popular vote	16,683	17,169	13,583
Percentage	27.1%	27.9%	22.5%
Swing	▼7.4%	▲17.4%	▼1.3%
	Fourth party	Fifth party
Party	Labour	Independent
Last election	0 seats, 11.0%	2 seats, 6.5%
Seats won	3	2
Seat change	▲3	Steady
Popular vote	6,455	6,212
Percentage	10.5%	10.1%
Swing	▼0.5%	▲3.6%
- Winner of each seat at the 2019 Lewes District Council election
Council control before election
No overall control
Council control after election
No overall control

The 2019 Lewes District Council election was held on 2 May 2019 to elect members of Lewes District Council in England. It took place on the same day as other district council elections in the United Kingdom.

Before the 2019 election, the Council was composed of 20 Conservatives, nine Liberal Democrats, three Greens and nine Independents. To take control of the council, 21 councillors out of 41 would be needed. Although the council remained under no overall control, the Conservatives remained the largest party with 19 councillors. The Green Party won the popular vote.

== Council composition ==
After the previous election the composition of the council was:

↓
24	11	3	2	1
Con	LD	G	I	UKIP

Prior to the election the composition of the council was:

↓
20	9	9	3
Con	LD	I	G

After the election the composition of the council was:

↓
19	9	8	3	2
Con	G	LD	Lab	I

Following the elections, a coalition between the Greens, Lib Dems, Labour and two Independent councillors took charge, ending eight years of Conservative administration. Zoe Nicholson, leader of the Greens, became the leader of the council, while James MacCleary, leader of the Lib Dems, became the deputy leader. They alternated holding the roles of leader and deputy leader each year until the following election in 2023.

== Summary ==
=== Election result ===
2019 Lewes District Council election
Party	Candidates	Seats	Gains	Losses	Net gain/loss	Seats %	Votes %	Votes	+/−
Conservative	41	19	1	5	▼5	46.3	27.1	16,683	–7.4
Green	39	9	6	0	▲6	22.0	27.9	17,169	+17.4
Liberal Democrats	30	8	0	4	▼3	19.5	22.5	13,583	–1.3
Labour	26	3	3	0	▲3	7.3	10.5	6,455	–0.5
Independent	11	2	0	1	Steady	4.9	10.1	6,212	+3.6
UKIP	5	0	0	0	▼1	0.0	2.0	1,261	–11.6

== Ward results ==
Sitting councillors are marked with an asterisk (*).

=== Chailey, Barcombe & Hamsey ===
Chailey, Barcombe & Hamsey (2 seats)
Party	Candidate	Votes	%	±%
Conservative	Sharon Davy *	706	45.2	
Conservative	Isabelle Linington	639	40.9	
Liberal Democrats	Peter Edward Spain	389	24.9	
Green	Holly Atkins	375	24.0	
Green	Brenda Barnes	343	21.9	
Liberal Democrats	Michael James Percy	340	21.8	
Labour	Nicholas George Belcher	129	8.3	
Labour	Jack Curham	102	6.5	
Turnout		1,580	40.3	
Rejected ballots		17	0.5	
Conservative win (new seat)				
Conservative win (new seat)				

=== Ditchling & Westmeston ===
Ditchling & Westmeston
Party	Candidate	Votes	%	±%
Conservative	Tom Jones *	455	47.7	–19.3
Liberal Democrats	Vicky Byrne	384	40.1	+23.3
Green	Anthony Shuster	119	12.4	+1.9
Majority		71	7.4	–42.8
Turnout		966	47.2	
Rejected ballots		8	0.8	
Conservative hold		Swing		

=== East Saltdean & Telscombe Cliffs ===
East Saltdean & Telscombe Cliffs (3 seats)
Party	Candidate	Votes	%	±%
Labour	Christine Sandra Robinson	786	37.4	
Conservative	Ron Maskell *	747	35.5	
Labour	Laurence O'Connor	721	34.3	
Conservative	Andy Smith *	692	32.9	
Conservative	Cathy Smith	672	32.0	
Green	Helen Thoms	621	29.5	
Independent	Wayne Colin Botting *	438	20.8	
Independent	Cathy Neave	382	18.2	
Independent	David Neave	328	15.6	
Liberal Democrats	Charles Robert Boxer	316	15.0	
Turnout		2,132	37.5	
Rejected ballots		29	0.5	
Labour gain from Conservative				
Conservative hold				
Labour gain from Conservative				

=== Kingston ===
Kingston
Party	Candidate	Votes	%	±%
Liberal Democrats	William David Meyer	424	51.8	+7.4
Conservative	Susan Chowen	191	23.3	–9.3
Green	Dirk Campbell	148	18.1	–4.8
Labour	David Michael Hallett	56	6.8	N/A
Majority		233	28.4	+16.6
Turnout		830	51.9	
Rejected ballots		11	1.3	
Liberal Democrats hold		Swing		

=== Lewes Bridge ===
Lewes Bridge (2 seats)
Party	Candidate	Votes	%	±%
Green	Zoe Nicholson	929	50.0	
Green	Adrian Ross	810	43.6	
Liberal Democrats	Janet Baah	733	39.5	
Liberal Democrats	John Tregea Lamb	609	32.8	
Labour	Matt Kent	216	11.6	
Labour	Joy Beverley Mercer	175	9.4	
Conservative	Frances Tufnell	165	8.9	
Conservative	Colin French	152	8.2	
Turnout		1,931	50.2	
Rejected ballots		73	1.9	
Green hold				
Green gain from Liberal Democrats				

=== Lewes Castle ===
Lewes Castle (2 seats)
Party	Candidate	Votes	%	±%
Green	Milly Manley	630	42.4	
Green	Roy Clay	560	37.7	
Liberal Democrats	Oli Henman	482	32.5	
Liberal Democrats	Kate Wood	437	29.4	
Labour	Emily Jane Clarke	370	24.9	
Labour	Louis Robert Blair	194	13.1	
Independent	Susan Jean Murray *	139	9.4	
Conservative	Rosemarie Jeffery	92	6.2	
Conservative	Karen French	90	6.1	
Turnout		1,509		
Rejected ballots		24	0.8	
Green hold				
Green gain from Liberal Democrats				

=== Lewes Priory ===
Lewes Priory (3 seats)
Party	Candidate	Votes	%	±%
Independent	Ruth O'Keeffe *	2,041	58.3	
Green	Imogen Makepeace	1,445	41.3	
Green	Matthew Bird	1,318	37.6	
Green	James Herbert	1,087	31.0	
Independent	Graham John Mayhew	930	26.6	
Independent	Stephen Alfred Catlin *	834	23.8	
Liberal Democrats	Joyce Dixon Bell	597	17.1	
Liberal Democrats	Kevin James West	504	14.4	
Liberal Democrats	David Jan Stechler	421	12.0	
Labour	Paul Grivell	227	6.5	
Labour	Trevor Hugh Hopper	225	6.4	
Labour	Tony Adams	212	6.1	
Conservative	Jane Slater	140	4.0	
Conservative	David Charnock	128	3.7	
Conservative	Tam Large	85	2.4	
Turnout		3,520	58.4	
Rejected ballots		19	0.2	
Independent hold				
Green hold				
Green gain from Independent				

=== Newhaven North ===
Newhaven North (2 seats)
Party	Candidate	Votes	%	±%
Independent	Steve Saunders *	393	34.9	
Liberal Democrats	Julie Lynn Carr *	311	27.6	
Independent	Paula Bridget Woolven	305	27.1	
Liberal Democrats	Charlie Carr	280	24.9	
Conservative	Tony Bradbury	269	23.9	
Conservative	Bill Giles	239	21.2	
Green	Nisha Vesuwala	118	10.5	
Green	David John Keymer Hoare	110	9.8	
Labour	Steve Floor	107	9.5	
Turnout		1,156	30.9	
Rejected ballots		30	1.3	
Independent win (new seat)				
Liberal Democrats win (new seat)				

=== Newhaven South ===
Newhaven South (3 seats)
Party	Candidate	Votes	%	±%
Liberal Democrats	Graham Roger Amy *	751	54.1	
Liberal Democrats	Christoph David Kurty	628	45.3	
Liberal Democrats	James Neville MacCleary	609	43.9	
Labour	Jan Wooding	322	23.2	
Conservative	Peter Charlton	261	18.8	
Green	Annabella Ashby	257	18.5	
Green	Elaine Bolt	251	18.1	
Conservative	Dave Argent	215	15.5	
Conservative	Linda Wallraven	212	15.3	
Green	Martin O'Brien	210	15.1	
Turnout		1,442	28.7	
Rejected ballots		55	1.3	
Liberal Democrats win (new seat)				
Liberal Democrats win (new seat)				
Liberal Democrats win (new seat)				

=== Newick ===
Newick
Party	Candidate	Votes	%	±%
Conservative	Roy Burman	443	57.0	–8.2
Liberal Democrats	James Guy Earl	156	20.1	–6.7
Green	Susan Jappie	135	17.4	+9.4
Labour	Jo Chamberlain	56	5.5	N/A
Majority		287	36.9	–1.5
Turnout		792	39.5	
Rejected ballots		15	1.9	
Conservative hold		Swing		

=== Ouse Valley & Ringmer ===
Ouse Valley & Ringmer (3 seats)
Party	Candidate	Votes	%	±%
Green	Johnny Denis	1,447	63.3	
Green	Emily O'Brien	1,135	49.7	
Green	Sean Macleod	1,023	44.8	
Liberal Democrats	Chris Bowers	599	26.2	
Conservative	Richard Turner *	520	22.7	
Conservative	Clare Herbert	518	22.7	
Liberal Democrats	Victoria Jane Vincent	504	22.0	
Conservative	David Terry	498	21.8	
Liberal Democrats	Malcolm Lawrence Welsh	468	20.5	
Labour	Derek Roger Brown	104	4.5	
Labour	Peter Stephen Hambly	94	4.1	
Turnout		2,312	46.7	
Rejected ballots		26	0.4	
Green gain from Liberal Democrats				
Green gain from Conservative				
Green gain from Conservative				

=== Peacehaven East ===
Peacehaven East (2 seats)
Party	Candidate	Votes	%	±%
Conservative	Lynda Margaret Duhigg	426	42.1	
Labour	Chris Collier	376	37.1	
Conservative	Nigel David Enever *	352	34.7	
Labour	Alan Alfred Milliner	330	32.6	
UKIP	Deborah Holt	207	20.4	
Green	Sylvie Bouhier	186	18.4	
Green	Lesley Orr	164	16.2	
Turnout		1,029	25.4	
Rejected ballots		16	0.8	
Conservative hold				
Labour gain from Conservative				

=== Peacehaven North ===
Peacehaven North (2 seats)
Party	Candidate	Votes	%	±%
Conservative	Phil Davis	454	45.5	
Conservative	Keira Dawn Rigden	448	44.9	
Labour	Dawn Paul	278	27.9	
Green	Katie Hawks	207	20.8	
UKIP	Ian Buchanan	193	19.4	
Green	Rikki Begley	158	15.8	
Turnout		1,004	27.0	
Rejected ballots		7	0.3	
Conservative hold				
Conservative hold				

=== Peacehaven West ===
Peacehaven West (2 seats)
Party	Candidate	Votes	%	±%
Conservative	Joe Miller	329	35.0	
Conservative	Nicola Kim Papanicolaou	323	34.4	
Independent	Lyn Mills	270	28.8	
UKIP	Phil Howson	233	24.8	
Green	Marisa Guthrie	222	23.6	
Liberal Democrats	Danny Zac Stephenson	209	22.3	
Green	Debra Vice-Holt	164	17.5	
Independent	Robbie Robertson *	152	16.2	
Turnout		964	25.7	
Rejected ballots		25	1.3	
Conservative hold				
Conservative hold				

=== Plumpton, Streat, East Chiltington & St John (Without) ===
Plumpton, Streat, East Chiltington & St John (Without)
Party	Candidate	Votes	%	±%
Liberal Democrats	Robert Banks	617	65.8	+21.6
Conservative	Stephen Morris	215	22.9	–18.2
Green	Brendan Carroll	79	8.4	–6.3
Labour	Frank Forman	27	2.9	N/A
Majority		402	42.9	+39.8
Turnout		949	54.6	
Rejected ballots		11	1.2	
Liberal Democrats hold		Swing		

=== Seaford Central ===
Seaford Central (2 seats)
Party	Candidate	Votes	%	±%
Liberal Democrats	Stephen Gauntlett *	575	46.0	
Conservative	Geoff Rutland	435	34.8	
Liberal Democrats	Maggie Wearmouth	393	31.4	
Labour Co-op	Penny Lower	371	29.7	
Conservative	Bill Webb	340	27.2	
Green	Veronica Sanz	219	17.5	
Green	Johannes Hirn	204	16.3	
Turnout		1,286	33.4	
Rejected ballots		35	1.4	
Liberal Democrats hold				
Conservative hold				

=== Seaford East ===
Seaford East (2 seats)
Party	Candidate	Votes	%	±%
Conservative	Phil Boorman	651	46.6	
Conservative	Julian Peterson *	631	45.2	
Green	Mary De Pleave	353	25.3	
UKIP	Pete Leeming	332	23.8	
UKIP	Eric Woodward	296	21.2	
Green	Steven Guthrie	265	19.0	
Labour Co-op	Alun Tlusty-Sheen	264	18.9	
Turnout		1,418	36.7	
Rejected ballots		22	0.8	
Conservative hold		Swing		
Conservative hold		Swing		

=== Seaford North ===
Seaford North (2 seats)
Party	Candidate	Votes	%	±%
Conservative	Jim Lord	505	41.7	
Conservative	Sylvia Lord	472	39.0	
Liberal Democrats	Morag Everden	400	33.1	
Liberal Democrats	Nazish Adil	381	31.5	
Green	Rebecca Francomb	308	25.5	
Labour	Graham Lower	184	15.2	
Green	Rachel Fryer	169	14.0	
Turnout		1,260	31.1	
Rejected ballots		50	2.0	
Conservative hold				
Conservative gain from Liberal Democrats				

=== Seaford South ===
Seaford South (2 seats)
Party	Candidate	Votes	%	±%
Conservative	Sam Adeniji *	598	42.7	
Liberal Democrats	Christine Brett	588	42.0	
Liberal Democrats	Olivia Honeyman *	581	41.5	
Conservative	Chris Sumners	496	35.5	
Labour	Christine Platford	208	14.9	
Green	Geoffrey Cox	182	13.0	
Green	Richard Ford	175	12.5	
Turnout		1,429	40.2	
Rejected ballots		30	1.0	
Conservative hold				
Liberal Democrats hold				

=== Seaford West ===
Seaford West (2 seats)
Party	Candidate	Votes	%	±%
Conservative	Ian White	769	56.4	
Conservative	Liz Boorman	749	55.0	
Green	Zoe Ford	566	41.5	
Green	Michael McCoy	365	26.8	
Labour	John Edson	321	23.6	
Turnout		1,408	36.6	
Rejected ballots		45	1.6	
Conservative hold				
Conservative hold				

=== Wivelsfield ===
Wivelsfield
Party	Candidate	Votes	%	±%
Conservative	Nancy Bikson	361	56.4	N/A
Liberal Democrats	Iantha Kirkup	167	26.1	N/A
Green	Patti Broome	112	17.5	N/A
Majority		194	30.3	N/A
Turnout		645	32.2	
Rejected ballots		5	0.8	
Conservative win (new seat)				

== Changes 2019–2023 ==
In March 2020, Sean Macleod resigned from the Green Party, joining the Liberal Democrats in June 2020.

=== By-elections ===
==== Seaford East ====
Seaford East by-election, 6 May 2021
Party	Candidate	Votes	%	±%
Conservative	Richard Turner	820	47.5	+0.9
Green	James Meek	452	26.2	+0.9
Liberal Democrats	Pinky Adil	347	20.1	N/A
Labour Co-op	Ann Biddle	109	6.3	−12.6
Majority		368	21.3	
Turnout		1,728	44.76	
Rejected ballots		17	1.0	
Conservative hold		Swing		

The by-election was triggered by the resignation of Conservative councillor Phil Boorman, who stood down from all his council seats citing an escalating level of harassment directed at him and his family.

==== Seaford West ====
Seaford West by-election, 6 May 2021
Party	Candidate	Votes	%	±%
Conservative	Linda Wallraven	1,028	56.3	−0.1
Liberal Democrats	Olivia Honeyman	401	22.0	N/A
Green	Gemma McFarlane	277	15.2	−26.3
Labour	Chris Purser	120	6.6	−17.0
Majority		627	34.3	
Turnout		1,826	47.96	
Rejected ballots		20	1.1	
Conservative hold				

The by-election was triggered by the sudden death of Conservative councillor Ian White, who had also served as leader of Seaford Town Council.

==== Peacehaven West ====
Peacehaven West by-election, 12 May 2022
Party	Candidate	Votes	%	±%
Labour	Ciarron Clarkson	641	54.2	New
Conservative	Katie Sanderson	477	40.4	+5.4
Green	Holly Atkins	32	2.7	−20.9
Liberal Democrats	Elizabeth Lee	32	2.7	−19.6
Majority		164	13.8	N/A
Turnout		1,182	32.0	+6.3
Rejected ballots		7	0.6	
Labour gain from Conservative		Swing	N/A	

The by-election was triggered by the resignation of Conservative councillor Joe Miller, who stood down with immediate effect citing personal reasons, including his upcoming marriage and a move away from the area.
