= 1980 Liberal Party of Canada leadership election =

Party election in Canada

1980 Liberal leadership election
- Date: March 21–23, 1980 (cancelled)
- Convention: Winnipeg, Manitoba
- Resigning leader: Pierre Trudeau
- Won by: Convention cancelled

The Liberal Party of Canada was expected to hold a leadership convention in early 1980 as a result of Pierre Trudeau's November 21, 1979 announcement that he would resign as Liberal leader as soon as his successor was chosen. The announcement came several months after Trudeau's government was defeated by the Progressive Conservatives and Joe Clark. The party executive called a convention to be held in Winnipeg in late March 1980 as per Trudeau's requested timeline.

The leadership election was cancelled, however, after Clark's minority government was defeated in the House of Commons on December 13, 1979, by a non-confidence vote, triggering a federal election. The party executive and caucus cancelled the leadership election after persuading Trudeau to rescind his resignation and lead the party into the February 18, 1980 federal election, which saw the Liberals return to office with a majority government. Trudeau would ultimately resign in 1984, triggering a leadership election later that year.

== Candidates ==
The only declared candidates were:

- Pierre de Bané, foemer MP for Matapédia—Matane (1968—1979), former Minister of Supply and Services (1978—1979).
- Madeline Hombert, shop owner from High River, Alberta.
- Denise Seguin, housewife from London, Ontario.

Other prospective candidates included:

- Bob Andras, MP for Thunder Bay—Nipigon, former Minister of Manpower and Immigration (1972–1976) and President of the Treasury Board (1976–1978).
- Lloyd Axworthy, MP for Winnipeg—Fort Garry.
- Jean Chrétien, MP for Saint-Maurice, former Minister of National Revenue (1968), Minister of Indian Affairs and Northern Development (1968–1974), President of the Treasury Board (1974–1976), Minister of Industry, Trade and Commerce (1976–1977), and Minister of Finance (1977–1979).
- Herb Gray, MP for Windsor West, former Minister of National Revenue (1970–1972) and Minister of Consumer and Corporate Affairs (1972–1976).
- Donald Stovel Macdonald, former MP for Rosedale (1962–1978), former Minister of National Defence (1970–1972), Minister of Energy, Mines and Resources (1972–1975), and Minister of Finance (1975–1977). Macdonald was considered by many to be the front runner.

Former minister of finance John Turner, who had run in the 1968 leadership election that elected Trudeau, was seen as a likely contender until his surprise December 10, 1979 announcement that he would not be a candidate.
