= Liberal Democratic Party leadership election =

Liberal Democratic Party leadership election may refer to:

- 2006 Liberal Democratic Party (Japan) leadership election
- 2007 Liberal Democratic Party (Japan) leadership election
- 2008 Liberal Democratic Party (Japan) leadership election
- 2009 Liberal Democratic Party (Japan) leadership election

== See also ==
- Liberal Democrats leadership election (disambiguation)
