= 2010 Liberal Democrats deputy leadership election =

- 9 June 2010
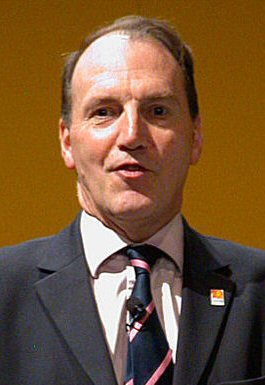

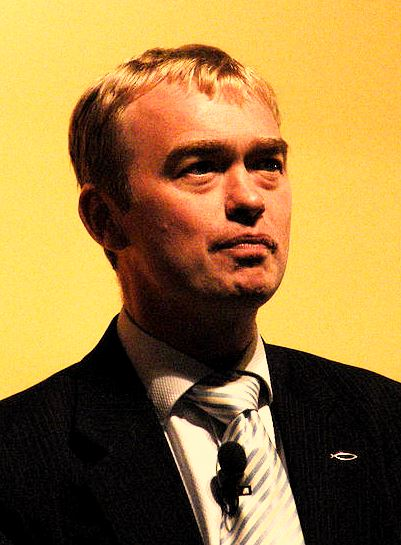
Candidate	Simon Hughes	Tim Farron
Popular vote	38	18
Percentage	67.9%	32.1%
Deputy Leader before election
Vince Cable
Elected Deputy Leader
Simon Hughes

The 2010 Liberal Democrats deputy leadership election began on 26 May 2010, when the sitting Deputy Leader of the Liberal Democrats, Vince Cable, announced his resignation following his appointment as Secretary of State for Business, Innovation and Skills in the Conservative-Liberal Democrat coalition government. Nominations closed on 2 June, and the balloting took place on 9 June. The election was won by Simon Hughes.

== Candidates ==
- Tim Farron, MP for Westmorland and Lonsdale, announced on 27 May 2010 that he would run for the election with the support of former party leader Sir Menzies Campbell.
- Simon Hughes, MP for Bermondsey and Old Southwark and former Party President, announced his intention to stand on 28 May 2010. He has been supported by former Deputy Leader Vince Cable.

Hughes was, from the start, reportedly leading in the election, having reportedly secured the support of at least 29 Lib Dem MPs. Not all MPs publicly declared their support for either candidate; of those Farron had the support of 11 and Hughes 21. Both candidates were former members of the Lib Dem Front Bench, but neither received a position in the coalition government.

== Result ==
Only ballot: 9 June 2010
Candidate	Votes	%
Simon Hughes	38	67.9
Tim Farron	18	32.1
Turnout	56	98.2
Simon Hughes elected
