= 2006 Liberal Democrats deputy leadership election =

- 29 March 2006
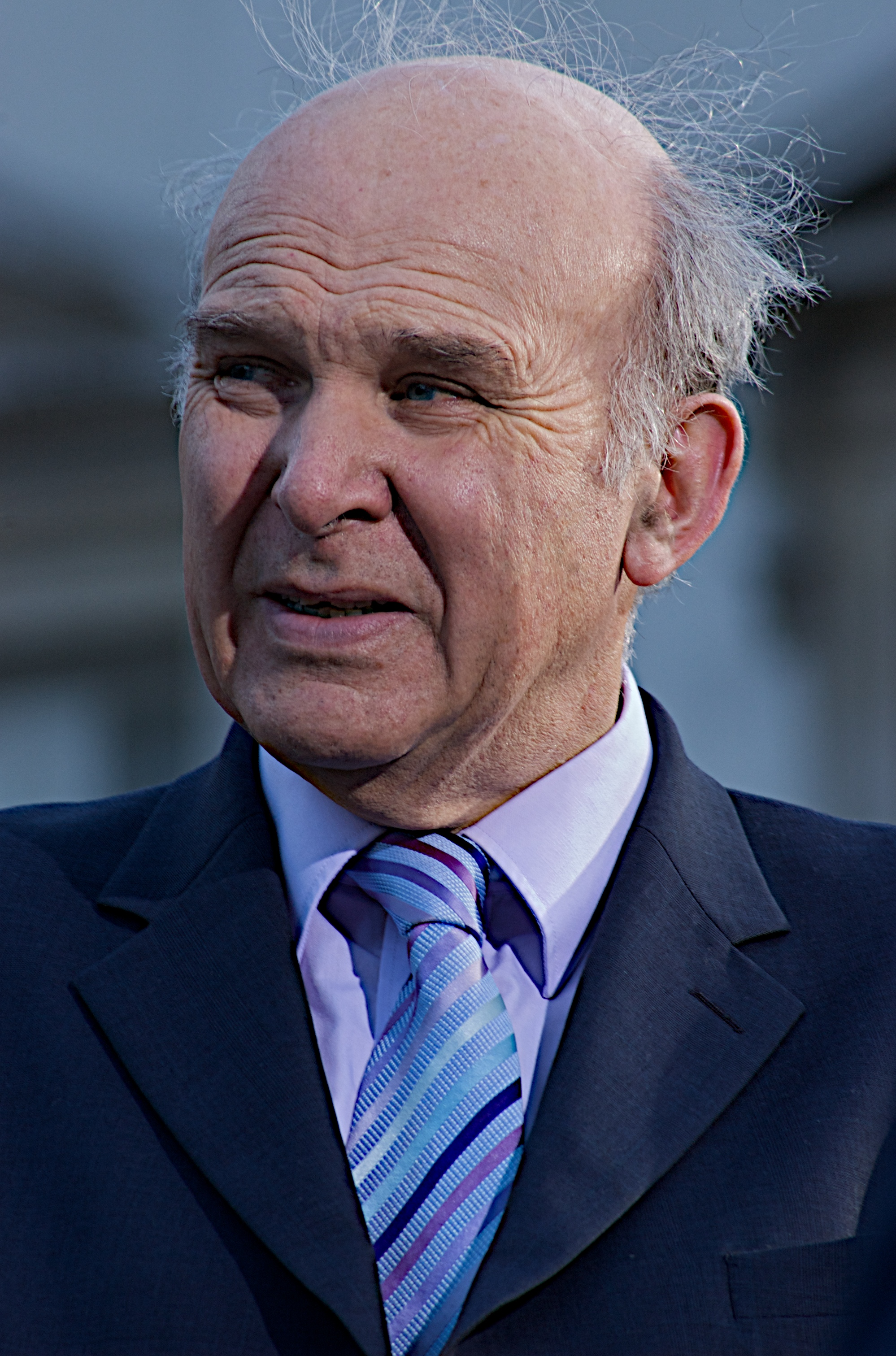

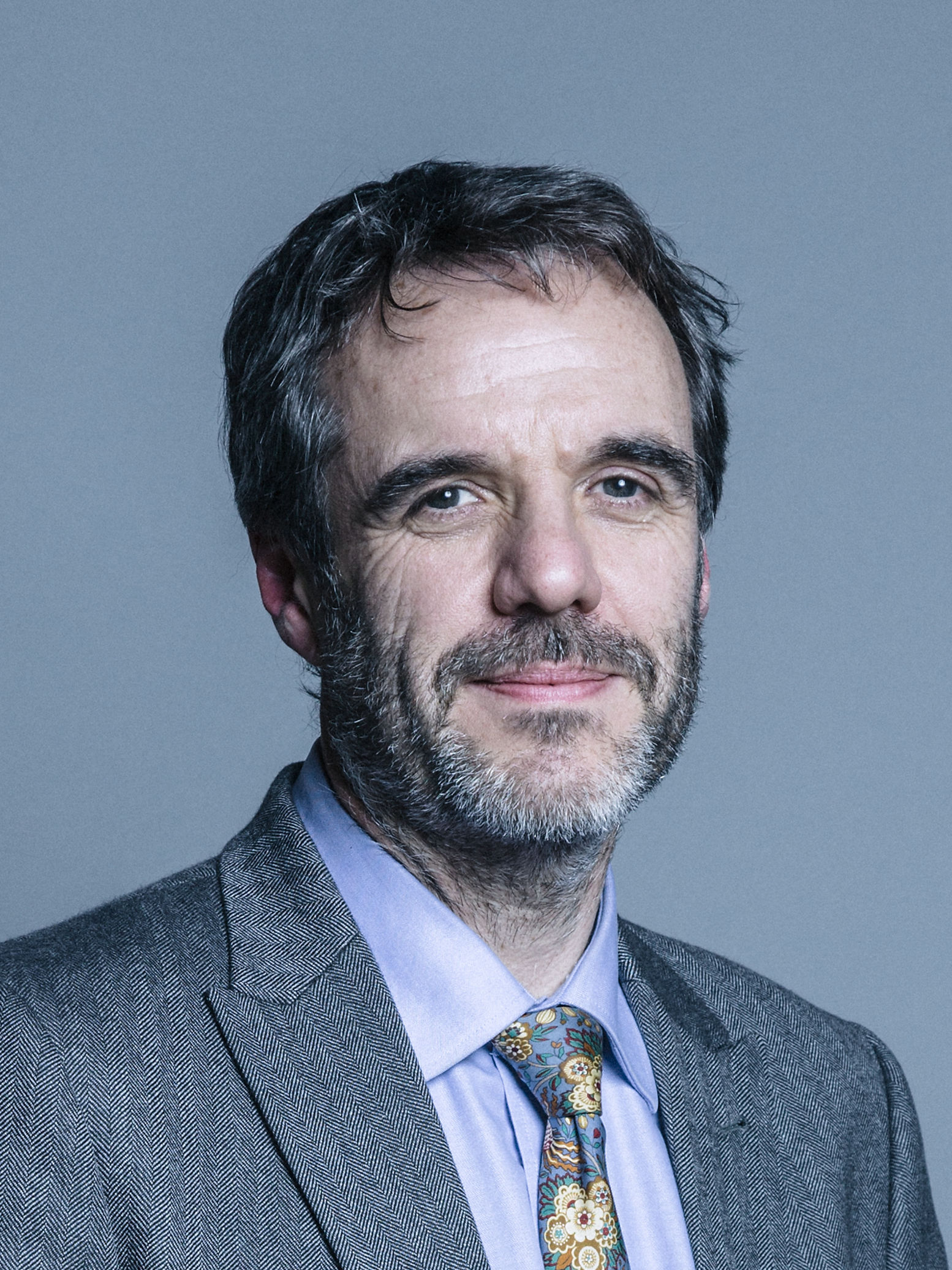

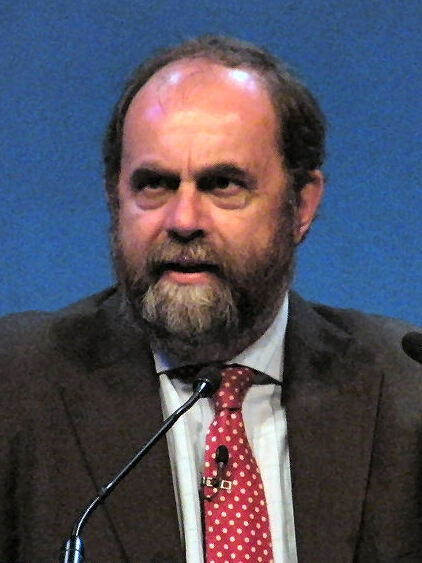
Candidate	Vince Cable	Matthew Taylor	David Heath
First round	21 (33.3%)	25 (39.7%)	17 (27.0%)
Second round	31 (51.7%)	29 (48.3%)	Eliminated
Deputy Leader before election
Menzies Campbell
Elected Deputy Leader
Vince Cable

The 2006 Liberal Democrats deputy leadership election began on 2 March 2006, when the sitting Deputy Leader of the Liberal Democrats, Sir Menzies Campbell, was elected leader of the party. Campbell had been deputy leader since February 2003.

The post was elected by and from the party's 63 Members of Parliament in the House of Commons, who voted on 29 March 2006. Vince Cable was elected as deputy leader in the second round. There were three candidates: Vince Cable, David Heath and Matthew Taylor. Three further MPs, Susan Kramer, Phil Willis and Ed Davey, canvassed support from colleagues but did not enter nominations.

== Result ==
First round
Candidate	Votes	%
Matthew Taylor	25	39.7
Vince Cable	21	33.3
David Heath	17	27.0
Turnout	63	100
Second ballot required

David Heath was eliminated after the first round, and his second preferences were redistributed.

Second round
Candidate	Change	Votes	%
Vince Cable	+10	31	51.7
Matthew Taylor	+4	29	48.3
Not transferable	+3	3	—
Turnout		63	100
Vince Cable elected

== See also ==
- 2003 Liberal Democrats deputy leadership election
