= Imogen Makepeace =

British mayor and anti-nuclear and climate activist

- Occupation: Local politician
- Known for: Mayor of Lewes, England; climate activist; peace and anti-nuclear activist

Imogen Makepeace is an English climate change activist, a local politician, most recently as mayor of Lewes in East Sussex, a feminist, and a peace campaigner, having been a participant at the Greenham Common Women's Peace Camp in late 1982 and early 1983.

== Early life and education ==
Little information is available about her early years, other than that she was a student in Brighton in 1982, studying catering. She later had three daughters and, objecting to the practice of women being given the surname of their fathers and husbands, gave her daughters the surname of "Makepeace". As this led to her being called "Mrs Makepeace" at the children's school she also adopted that surname.

== Peace activism ==
The protest against American nuclear-armed cruise missiles being based in RAF Greenham Common, near Newbury, Berkshire in England began with a march from Cardiff in Wales at the end of August 1981. On arrival, some of the marchers decided to form a permanent camp. Makepeace and some friends in Brighton began to pay regular weekend visits to Greenham, taking supplies for the campers with them. In October 1982 she decided to move to the camp. She recalled that there was always some sort of direct action in progress, such as trying to block access of vehicles including buses taking civilian staff to work. In an interview conducted in March 2022 she recalled that the camp was receiving mail from all over the world with messages of support.

Makepeace was one of the approximately 25 women who broke into the base in the early morning of 1 January 1983 by climbing over the fence, covering the barbed wire with blankets. When they arrived at the missile silos they danced on top of them. She had thought that there was a good chance that they would have been shot. She was arrested and put in a single cell for several days, recalling the nasty and dehumanising treatment she received, particularly from female police officers.

She left Greenham shortly after and returned to Brighton. In February 1983 she and others set up a peace camp on The Level in Brighton, one of several satellite camps around the country. They contrasted the tolerant policing in Brighton with the heavy-handed behaviour of the police at Greenham.

== Career ==
Makepeace was a student midwife between 1997 and 2000. Between 1992 and 2014 she ran The Beautiful Birth Centre, a business that hired heated and filtered birthing pools, and also prepared The Online Directory for all Birth Pool Hire and Sales. Between 2005 and 2010 she was a natal hypnotherapist. In November 2014 she began to work as a taxi driver.

== Green politics ==
Makepeace joined the Green Party of England and Wales (GPEW) in Lewes in 2015. She was elected as a town councillor for the Lewes Priory constituency and, in 2019, as a councillor for Lewes District, also representing Lewes Priory. She has served on the Buildings and Amenities Committee and the Planning Committee. In 2023 she became deputy mayor of Lewes. Following her resignation from the GPEW in April 2024 she was elected by the council as the new mayor of Lewes on 9 May 2024. For her inaugural address she wore the patchwork Coat of Hopes, which was originally worn on a walk from Newhaven in Lewes District to Glasgow on the occasion of the 2021 United Nations Climate Change Conference (COP26) and was created by local artist Barbara Keal.

Her resignation from the GPEW stemmed from her disagreement with the party's policy on trans women. She resigned on 3 April 2024, soon after reading the email from the party's complaints manager informing her that she had been put on a "No Fault Suspension" (NFS). She stated that party members had previously had the right to disagree with party policy if they prefaced their statements with "this is Green Party policy, however, I disagree." However, the rule was no longer being applied in the case of the policy towards trans women and members were expected to support the party line. She said that she had previously stated that she did not agree that men could become women, a view she had held since joining the party in 2015.

== Extinction Rebellion ==
Makepeace is a supporter of Extinction Rebellion (XR), a UK-founded global environmental movement, which aims to use civil disobedience to compel government action on climate change and biodiversity loss. She was briefly arrested at the XR's "Declaration of Rebellion" on 31 October 2018 in Parliament Square, London. She was arrested again on London's Waterloo Bridge during XR's 2019 April Rebellion, when gardeners, musicians, cooks and jugglers created a temporary village on the bridge. She participated in other XR events in London, aware that further arrest could lead to prison. In Lewes, XR have held several actions, including a New Orleans style funeral march.
