= 2003 Liberal Democrats deputy leadership election =

- February 2003
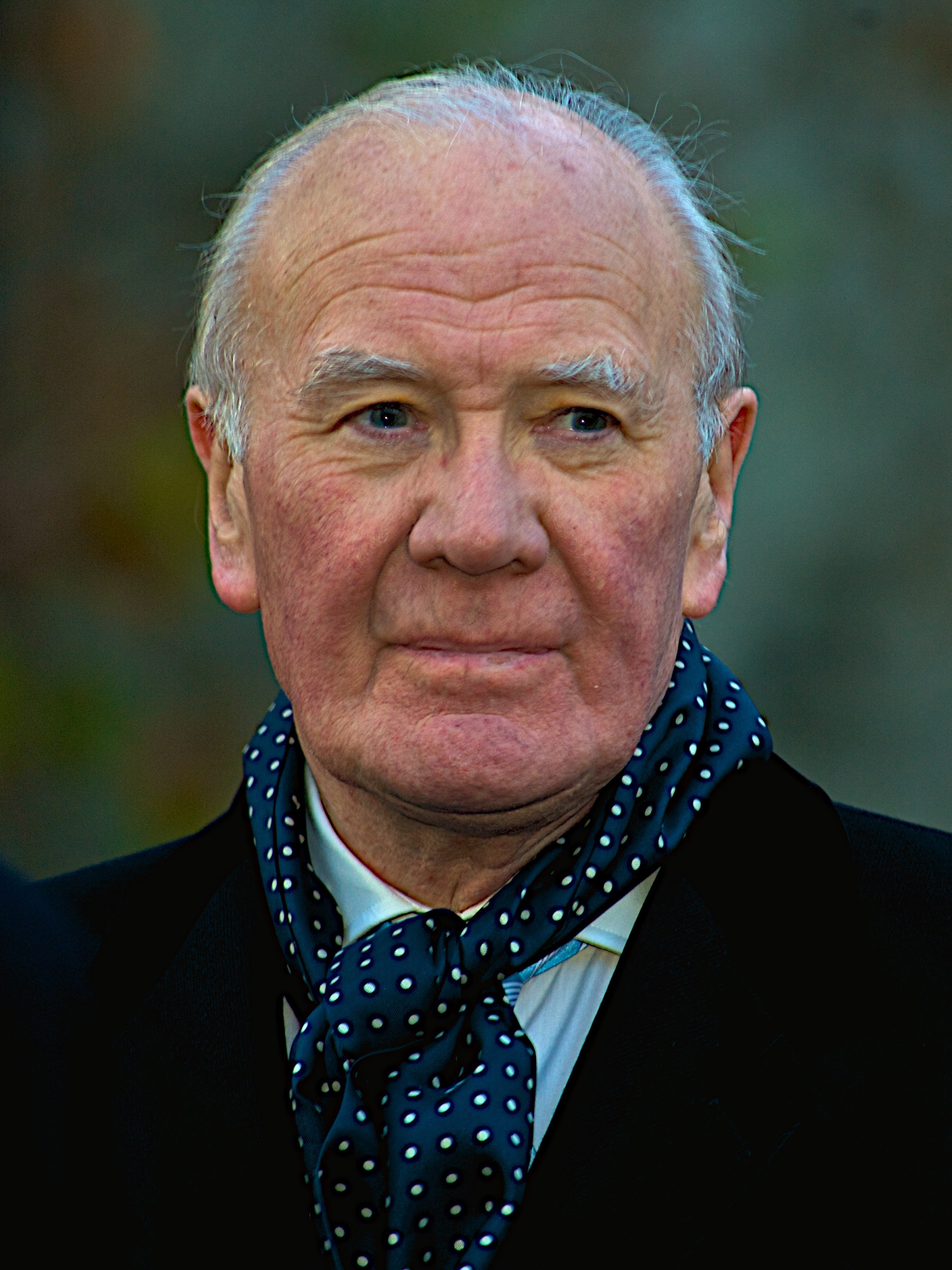

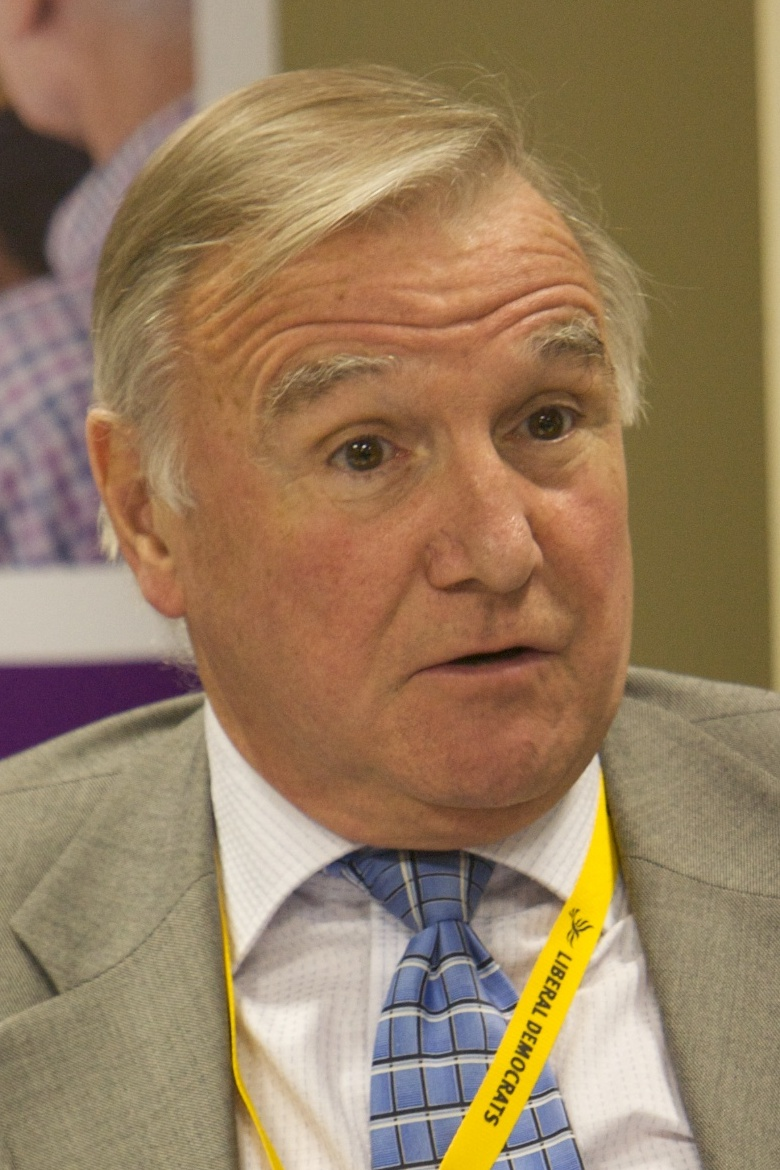
Candidate	Menzies Campbell	Malcolm Bruce
Popular vote	31	22
Percentage	58.5%	41.5%
Deputy Leader before election
Alan Beith
Elected Deputy Leader
Menzies Campbell

The 2003 Liberal Democrats deputy leadership election took place in February 2003, following the decision by the incumbent, Alan Beith to stand down as Deputy Leader of the Liberal Democrats, a political party in the United Kingdom. The post was voted on by the party's then 53 Members of Parliament in the House of Commons.

The election was expected to be contested by Simon Hughes, who had come second in the 1999 leadership election, but in the event he declined to run, instead running to be Mayor of London in the 2004 elections. In the event the candidates were Menzies Campbell, the party's foreign affairs spokesperson, and Malcolm Bruce, spokesperson for Environment, Food and Rural Affairs.

== Result ==
Only ballot: February 2003
Candidate	Votes	%
Menzies Campbell	31	58.49
Malcolm Bruce	22	41.51
Turnout	53	100
Menzies Campbell elected

== See also ==
- 2006 Liberal Democrats deputy leadership election
