= 2014 Liberal Democrats deputy leadership election =

- 28 January 2014
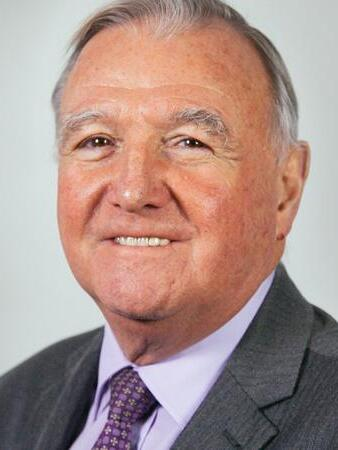

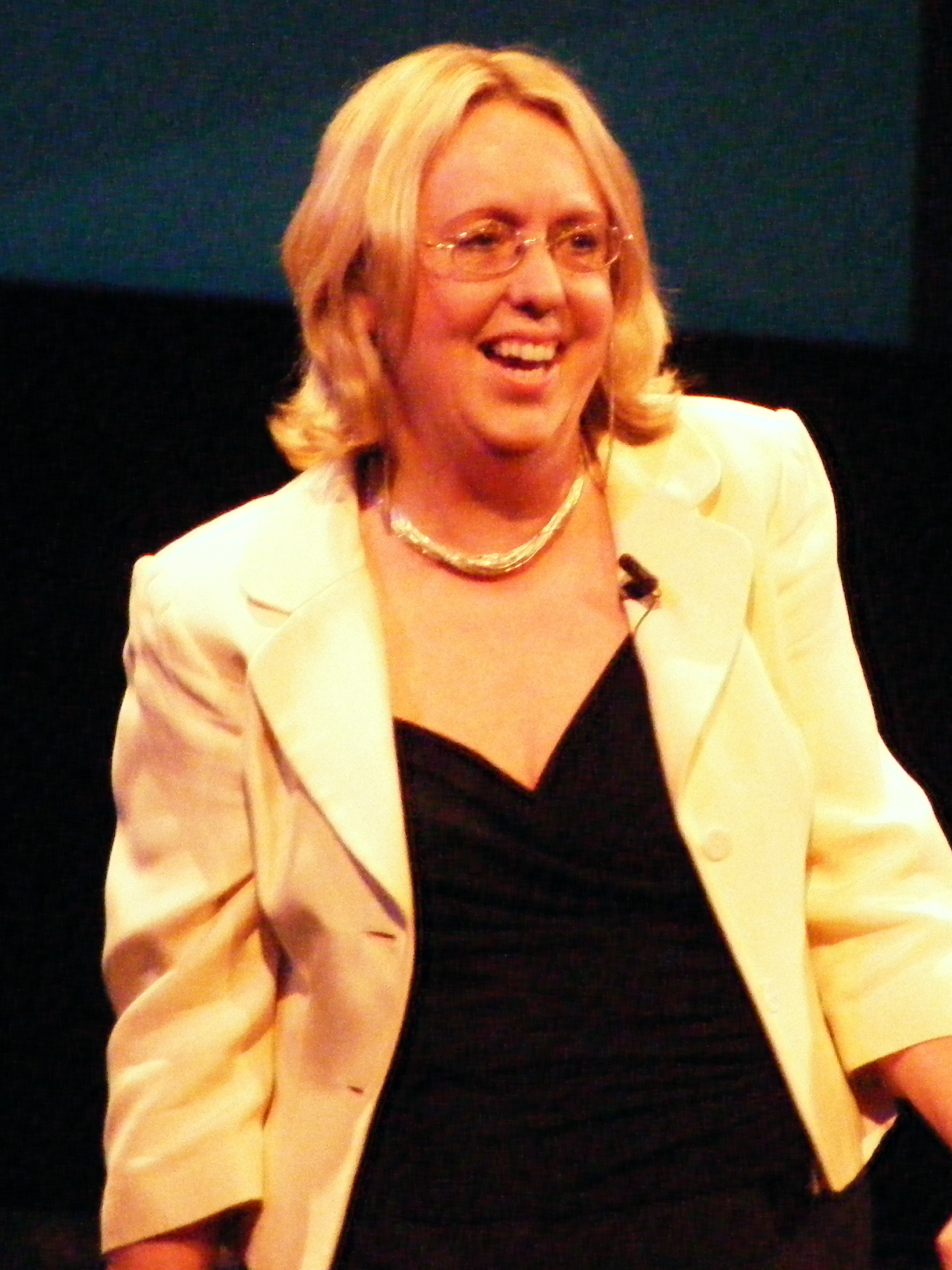

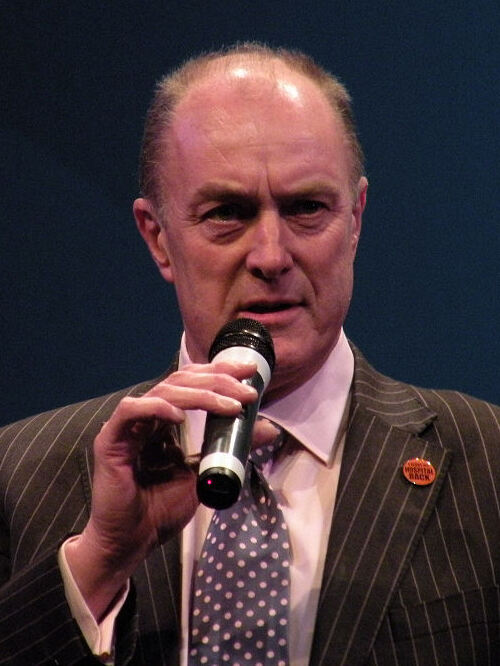
Candidate	Malcolm Bruce	Lorely Burt	Gordon Birtwistle
First round	26 (48.2%)	25 (46.3%)	3 (5.6%)
Second round	28 (52.8%)	25 (47.2%)	Eliminated
Deputy Leader before election
Simon Hughes
Elected Deputy Leader
Malcolm Bruce

The 2014 Liberal Democrats deputy leadership election began on 18 December 2013, when the incumbent Deputy Leader of the Liberal Democrats, Simon Hughes, was appointed Minister of State at the Ministry of Justice, and opted to resign his party position to focus on his new post.

The post was elected by and from the party's 55 Members of Parliament in the House of Commons, who voted on 28 January 2014. (57 Liberal Democrat MPs had been elected at the previous general election, but at the time of the vote, both David Ward and Mike Hancock had had the whip withdrawn.) Lorely Burt was seen as the front-runner, yet veteran MP Sir Malcolm Bruce, who had already announced that he would be standing down at the May 2015 general election, was elected as Deputy Leader on the second round of voting.

== Candidates ==
=== Declared candidates ===
- Gordon Birtwistle, Member of Parliament for Burnley (since 2010)
- Sir Malcolm Bruce, Chair of the International Development Committee (since 2005), former Chair of the Parliamentary Party (1999–2001), Member of Parliament for Gordon (since 1983) and candidate for leader in 1999
- Lorely Burt, Parliamentary Private Secretary to Danny Alexander, former Chair of the Parliamentary Party (2007–2012), Member of Parliament for Solihull (since 2005)

=== Potential candidates who declined to stand ===
- Jeremy Browne, former Minister of State for the Home Office (2012–2013) and Minister of State for Europe and the Americas (2010–2012), Member of Parliament for Taunton Deane (since 2005)
- Andrew George, Member of Parliament for St Ives (since 1997)
- Steve Gilbert, Parliamentary Private Secretary to Ed Davey, Member of Parliament for St Austell and Newquay (since 2010)
- Duncan Hames, Parliamentary Private Secretary to Nick Clegg, Member of Parliament for Chippenham (since 2010)
- Nick Harvey, former Minister of State for the Armed Forces (2010–2012), Member of Parliament for North Devon (since 1992)
- Julian Huppert, Member of Parliament for Cambridge (since 2010)
- Michael Moore, former Secretary of State for Scotland (2010–2013), Member of Parliament for Berwickshire, Roxburgh and Selkirk (since 1997)
- Tessa Munt, Parliamentary Private Secretary to Vince Cable, Member of Parliament for Wells (since 2010)

== Run-up to the election ==
The election coincided with the conclusion of Alistair Webster QC's report on the allegations of sexual harassment surrounding the party's former Chief Executive Lord Rennard, and in the weeks leading up to it, the party received extensive coverage surrounding sexual harassment claims against senior party figures including Lord Rennard, MP Mike Hancock, and AM William Powell.

Accordingly, numerous media commentators noted that it appeared highly likely the party would seek to offset criticism of its treatment of women by electing the frontrunner Burt as the party's first woman Deputy Leader, and after receiving 24 nominations, she was described as "the firm favourite".

== Result ==
First round
Candidate	Votes	%
Sir Malcolm Bruce	26	48.1
Lorely Burt	25	46.3
Gordon Birtwistle ✗	3	5.6
Abstention	1	—
Turnout	54	98.2
Second ballot required

Gordon Birtwistle was eliminated after the first round, and his second preferences were redistributed.

Second round
Candidate	Change	Votes	%
Sir Malcolm Bruce ✓	+2	28	52.8
Lorely Burt	+0	25	47.2
Abstention	+1	2	—
Turnout		53	96.4
Sir Malcolm Bruce elected

== Aftermath ==
Some expressed surprise at Burt's defeat by Bruce, with the Daily Express branding the result "a blunder of Olympian proportions" which left the party open to accusations of being "pale, male and stale".
