= Daisy Cooper =

British politician (born 1981)

Daisy Cooper MP
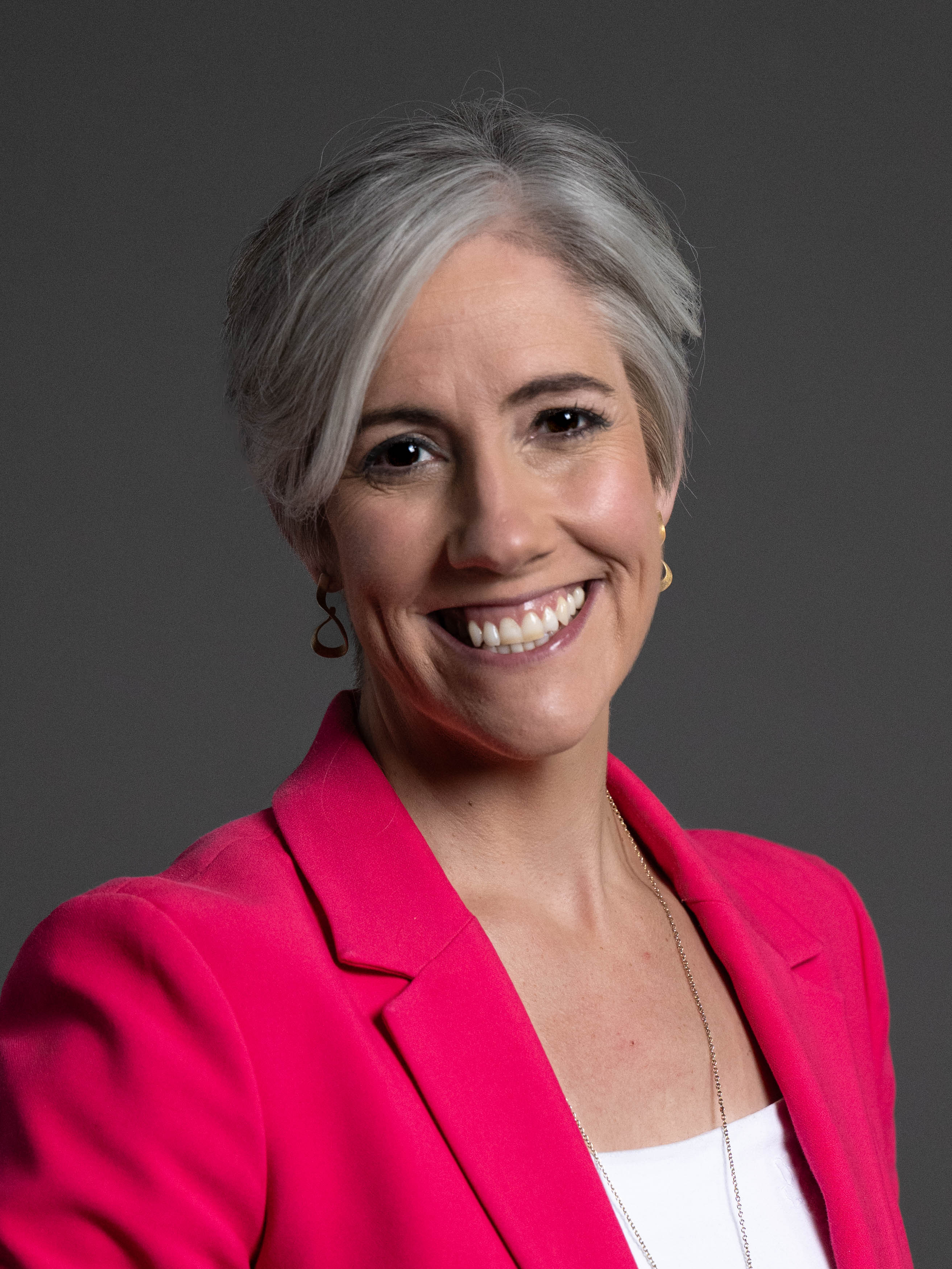
- Official portrait, 2025

Deputy Leader of the Liberal Democrats
- Incumbent
- Assumed office 13 September 2020
- Leader: Ed Davey
- Preceded by: Ed Davey

Member of Parliament for St Albans
- Incumbent
- Assumed office 12 December 2019
- Preceded by: Anne Main
- Majority: 19,834 (38.4%)

Liberal Democrat portfolios
- 2020: Digital, Culture, Media and Sport
- 2020: Justice
- 2020–2021: Education
- 2021–2024: Health, Wellbeing and Social Care
- 2024–present: Treasury

Personal details
- Born: 29 October 1981 (age 45) Bury St Edmunds, Suffolk, England
- Party: Liberal Democrats
- Education: University of Leeds (LLB); University of Nottingham (LLM)
- Website: daisycooper.org.uk

Daisy Cooper (born 29 October 1981) is a British Liberal Democrat politician who has served as the Member of Parliament (MP) for St Albans since 2019. She has served as Deputy Leader of the Liberal Democrats since 2020, as well as the Liberal Democrat Treasury spokesperson since 2024.

Cooper was previously the Liberal Democrat spokesperson for Health, Wellbeing and Social Care from October 2021 to September 2024, spokesperson for Education from September 2020 to October 2021, and the spokesperson for Justice and for Digital, Culture, Media and Sport from January 2020 to September 2020.

== Early life and career ==
Daisy Cooper was born on 29 October 1981 in Bury St Edmunds. She was educated at Halesworth Middle School, Bungay High School and then privately educated at Framlingham College in Suffolk, before gaining a Bachelor of Laws honours degree from the University of Leeds and a Master of Laws degree in public international law from the University of Nottingham. She also has a foundation certificate in psychotherapy and counselling and is an SPC Accredited Mediator.

Before becoming an MP, Cooper worked in Commonwealth affairs including at the Commonwealth Secretariat and the Institute of Commonwealth Studies. She also worked for Voluntary Service Overseas, for the Hacked Off campaign for victims of press abuse, and for the cross-party group More United. She also runs a local independent campaign group for rail users.

== Early political career ==
She stood for president of the Liberal Democrats in 2014, coming second to Sal Brinton. During the campaign for the presidency, she declared her support for the group "Humanist and Secularist Liberal Democrats".

Cooper stood in the 2015 Lewes District Council election held on the same day; she was elected to represent the Lewes Bridge ward. Cooper stepped down as a councillor in 2016.

== Parliamentary career ==
Cooper was the Liberal Democrat candidate for Suffolk Coastal at the 2010 general election, where she came second with 29.8% of the vote behind the Conservative candidate Thérèse Coffey.

At the 2015 general election, Cooper stood in Mid Sussex, coming fourth with 11.5% of the vote behind the incumbent Conservative MP Nicholas Soames, the Labour candidate, and the UKIP candidate.

Cooper stood in St Albans at the 2017 general election, coming second with 32.4% of the vote behind the incumbent Conservative MP Anne Main.

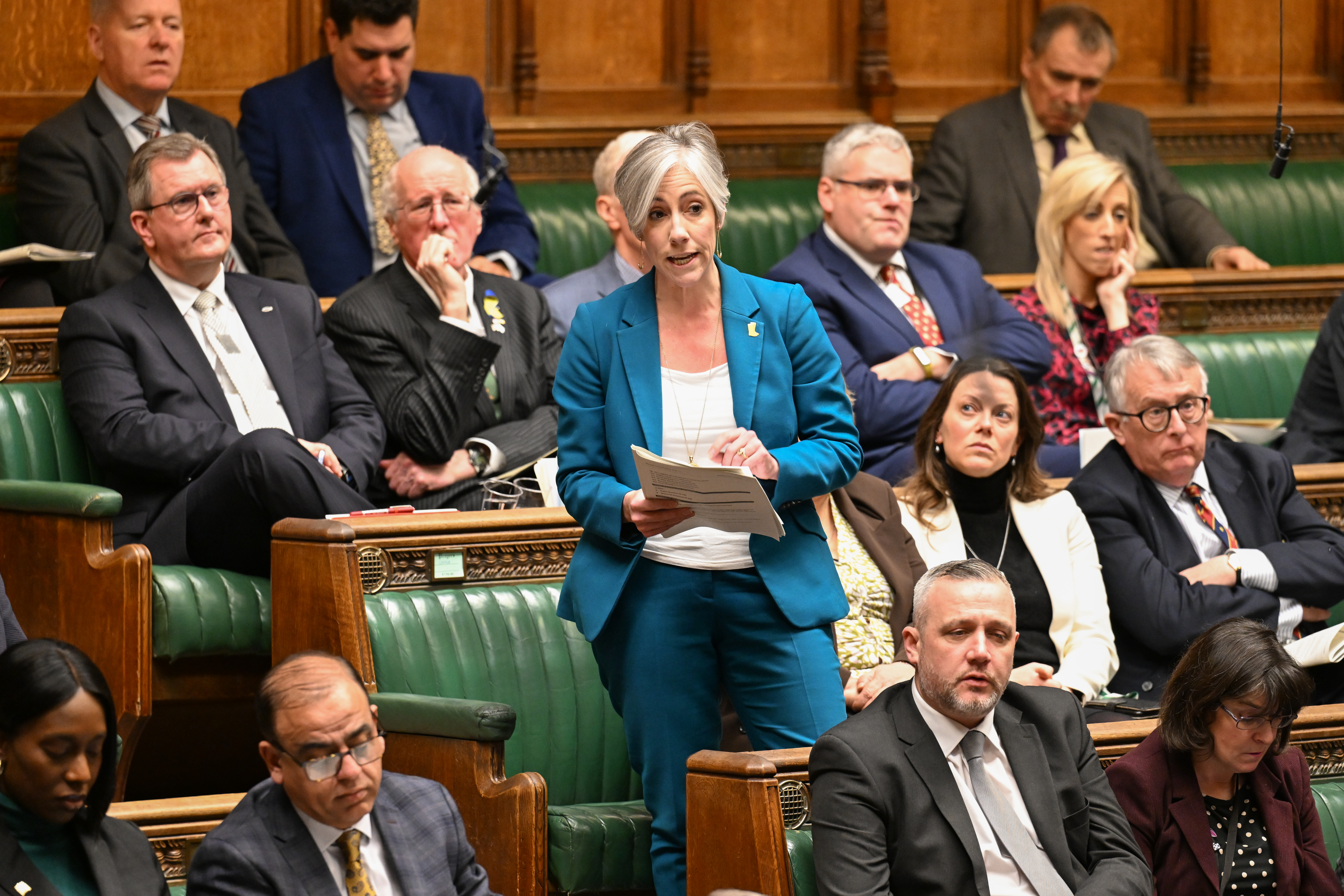
Cooper speaking during Prime Minister's Questions, 7 February 2024

Cooper was elected to Parliament as MP for St Albans at the 2019 general election with 50.1% of the vote and a majority of 6,293. The Guardian named Cooper as one of the ten new MPs from all political parties to "watch out for".

In January 2020, it was announced Cooper had been appointed as the Liberal Democrats' justice, culture, media and sport spokesperson. In June, she took part in George Floyd protests in Verulamium Park, St Albans, where she gave a speech about police brutality.

In September 2020, Cooper was announced as the party's new deputy leader and education spokesperson.

In May 2021, Cooper was a signatory to an open letter from Stylist magazine, alongside celebrities and other public figures, which called on the government to address what it described as an "epidemic of male violence" by funding an "ongoing, high-profile, expert-informed awareness campaign on men’s violence against women and girls".

In October 2021, Cooper was appointed Liberal Democrat spokesperson for Health, Wellbeing and Social Care, a position she would hold into the next general election.

Cooper was re-elected as MP for St Albans at the 2024 general election with an increased vote share of 56.6% and an increased majority of 19,834. During the election period, Cooper had participated in the televised leaders debates.

On 16 September 2024, Cooper moved from being Heath, Wellbeing and Social Care spokesperson and was named Liberal Democrat Treasury spokesperson, replacing Sarah Olney.

=== Amendment to the Children's Wellbeing and Schools Bill ===
In January 2025, the opposition Conservative Party tabled a reasoned amendment regarding the Children's Wellbeing and Schools Bill that aimed to set up a national inquiry into grooming gangs. If the amendment was passed the Bill would not have been allowed to proceed.

In a post on X, Cooper responded to a BBC Radio 4 Today programme interview with Robert Jenrick, the Conservative Shadow Justice Minister, on the topic of grooming gangs, stating that "Robert Jenrick's attempt to exploit this appalling scandal for political gain is completely shameless. He didn't lift a finger to help the victims when a Minister, now he's jumping on the bandwagon and acting like a pound shop Farage." Cooper went on to add that "Kemi Badenoch should sack him as Shadow Justice Secretary and condemn his divisive comments, instead of letting him run a leadership campaign under her nose."

A spokesman for Badenoch responded that "Robert Jenrick did an excellent job this morning explaining the pressing need for a national inquiry into the rape gangs scandal. The Liberal Democrats should spend less time worrying about tweets, and instead explain to the British people why they oppose an inquiry that would end the culture of cover ups in our institutions and finally get justice for the victims.”

On 8 January 2025, Jenrick and all MPs for the Conservative Party voted for the amendment whilst all Liberal Democrats abstained, Labour MPs voted against the amendment and Reform UK MPs voted for the amendment. The amendment was defeated by a margin of 364 against and 111 votes in favour.

Parliament of the United Kingdom
| Preceded by Anne Main | Member of Parliament for St Albans; 2019–present | Incumbent |
Party political offices
| Preceded by Ed Davey | Deputy Leader of the Liberal Democrats; 2020–present | Incumbent |
