= Animal Protection Party =

The Animal Protection Party
- Spokesperson: Sarah Coats, Carrie Holliman, Jim Kapetanos, and Keith Mann
- Founded: 2 November 2006
- Dissolved: 3 November 2016
- Headquarters: Bexleyheath, Kent
- Ideology: Animal rights

Website
- The Animal Protection Party (archived)

The Animal Protection Party (APP) was a political party founded in England in 2006 to represent an animal rights perspective. It stood four candidates in the 2010 general election. The party de-registered in 2016.

== 2010 general election ==
The APP stood in four constituencies in the May 2010 British general election, chosen because the sitting MP was viewed by the APP as representing the interests of people or industries that use animals.

- Sarah Coats, a recycling company administrator, stood in Meon Valley, a new constituency where Wickham Laboratories is based. Coats received 255 votes (0.3%); the seat was taken by George Hollingbery for the Conservatives.
- Carrie Holliman (listed by the Electoral Commission as the party leader) stood in Huntingdon, where Huntingdon Life Sciences is based, against Conservative MP Jonathan Djanogly. She received 181 votes (0.3%). Djanogly held the seat.
- Jim Kapetanos stood in Vauxhall against the Labour MP Kate Hoey, chair of the Countryside Alliance, which promotes hunting. He received 96 votes (0.2%) and Hoey comfortably held the seat.
- Keith Mann, who had previously been jailed for arson, stood in Oxford West and Abingdon against the Liberal Democrat MP Evan Harris; the area had been the focus of protests against the building of Oxford University's Biomedical Sciences Building. Mann received 143 votes (0.3%); Harris lost the seat to Nicola Blackwood for the Conservative Party. Mann said, "I wanted to challenge because of his support for animal testing in Oxford, but also because of his desire to extend the abortion time limit."

== See also ==
- Animal Welfare Party
- List of animal advocacy parties
