= Keith Mann =

British animal rights campaigner and direct action activist

- Born: Rochdale, Greater Manchester, England
- Occupations: Activist, writer
- Years active: 1982–2025
- Organisation: Animal Liberation Front
- Website: fromdusktildawn.org.uk

Keith Mann was a British animal rights campaigner and direct action activist who acted as a spokesman for the Animal Liberation Front (ALF), and was alleged by police in 2005 to be a ringleader for the ALF. He was imprisoned twice, and is the author of From Dusk 'til Dawn: An Insider's View of the Growth of the Animal Liberation Movement (2007).

== Background ==
Mann was raised in Rochdale, Greater Manchester, by his father, who worked as a caretaker, and his mother whom he describes as having done "everything else". His lasting memory of his first job, on a dairy farm, is the cows crying out all day searching for the calves that had been removed from them. He first came into contact with animal rights activists in 1982, when local hunt saboteurs were handing out leaflets in the street. His first removal of an animal from captivity was when he took a rabbit from a hutch that he used to walk past every day, after having asked the owner for weeks to do something about the rabbit's situation. He writes that this incident changed his view of theft forever, and that he thereafter viewed himself as a "proud ALF activist." His next removal was of a tub of goldfish from a fairground, resulting in him having 53 goldfish in his bath for weeks until he found good ponds for them.

== Direct action ==
Mann espoused direct action and was considered by police to be the ringleader of the Animal Liberation Front. He was imprisoned twice for illegal acts related to his activism.

Mann was arrested in 1991 after carrying out a series of fire attacks on slaughterhouse lorries in Oldham. He escaped custody and went on the run for 10 months, working at an animal sanctuary run by the Celia Hammond Animal Trust under an assumed name. In 1994, Mann was sentenced to 14 years imprisonment, eventually serving seven years, for 21 offences including arson, possessing explosives and escaping from custody.

On 13 December 2003 Mann and Melvyn Glintenkamp entered Wickham Laboratories and removed 695 mice being used to test botulinum toxin. He was arrested at his home and the mice were returned to the laboratory. He argued that the tests were illegal because the product was being tested for cosmetic purposes, which is banned in Britain. A court rejected Mann's defence, ruling that the tests were in compliance with UK regulations, because Botox is also used for therapeutic purposes to prevent muscle spasm. In April 2005 he was found guilty of burglary and given 230 hours community service. On leaving the court, he threatened a director of the company, telling him: "Your trouble has only just started, you will need to look under your bed", which led to a charge of contempt of court and six months in custody, which he served in Winchester Prison.

In 2007 Mann was involved in Gateway to Hell, a campaign aimed at airports, ports and freight firms importing animals for experimentation. The National Extremism Tactical Co-ordination Unit believed the group was linked to Stop Huntingdon Animal Cruelty (SHAC), an international campaign to close down Huntingdon Life Sciences, a contract animal-testing facility. The homes of five air transport executives were attacked within days of the Gateway campaign beginning. Mann said, "Once we have stopped the airports, which we will do before too long, it is going to be difficult for them to find other ways of bringing animals in."

== The Animal Protection Party ==
In January 2008, SPEAK Political — since renamed The Animal Protection Party — announced that Mann would stand as an electoral candidate. Mann stood in Oxford West and Abingdon against Liberal Democrat MP Evan Harris in the 2010 general election. The area was the focus of protests due to the establishment of Oxford University's Biomedical Sciences Building. Mann received 143 votes (0.3 percent) and Harris lost the seat to Nicola Blackwood of the Conservative Party.

== Bibliography ==
- From Dusk 'til Dawn: An Insider's View of the Growth of the Animal Liberation Movement (2007), ISBN 0955585007
- I Am Keith Mann: I Cured Cancer at home (2018), ISBN 9781999672911

== See also ==
- Behind the Mask, 2006 film
- List of animal rights advocates
