= Lord Patten =

Lord Patten may refer to two British Conservative politicians:

- Chris Patten, Baron Patten of Barnes (born 1944), Governor of Hong Kong (to 1997), Chancellor of the University of Oxford
- John Patten, Baron Patten (born 1945), Secretary of State for Education 1992–1994
