= Tiller =

Lever used to steer a vehicle, typically on boats

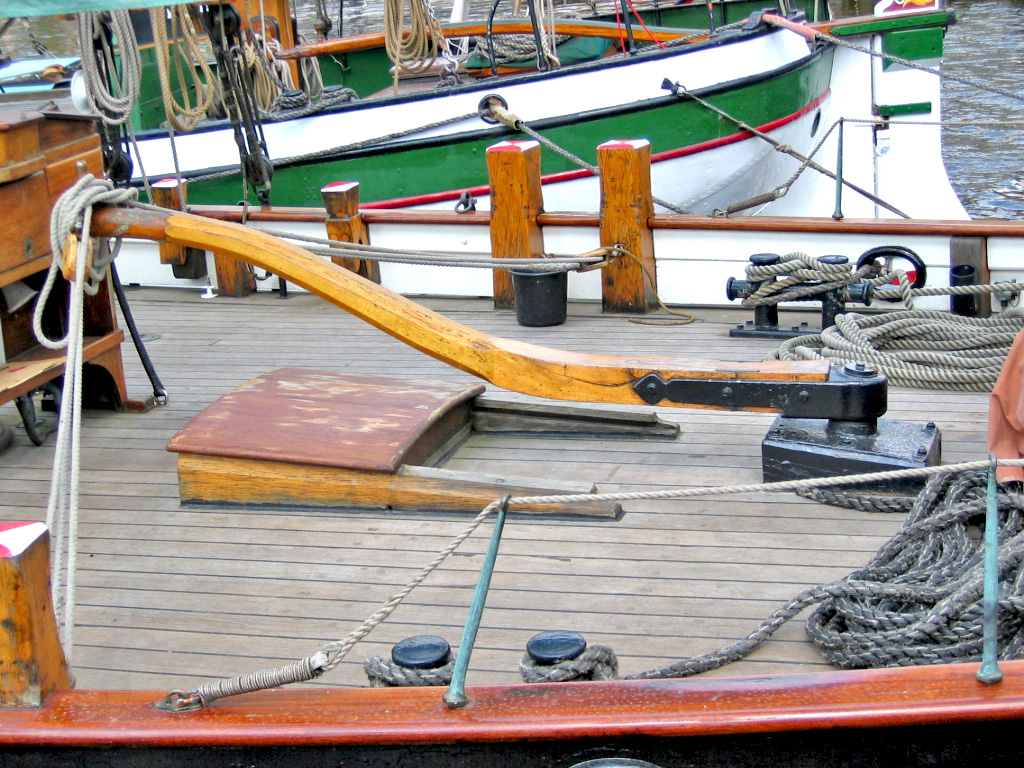
Tiller blocked by two lines

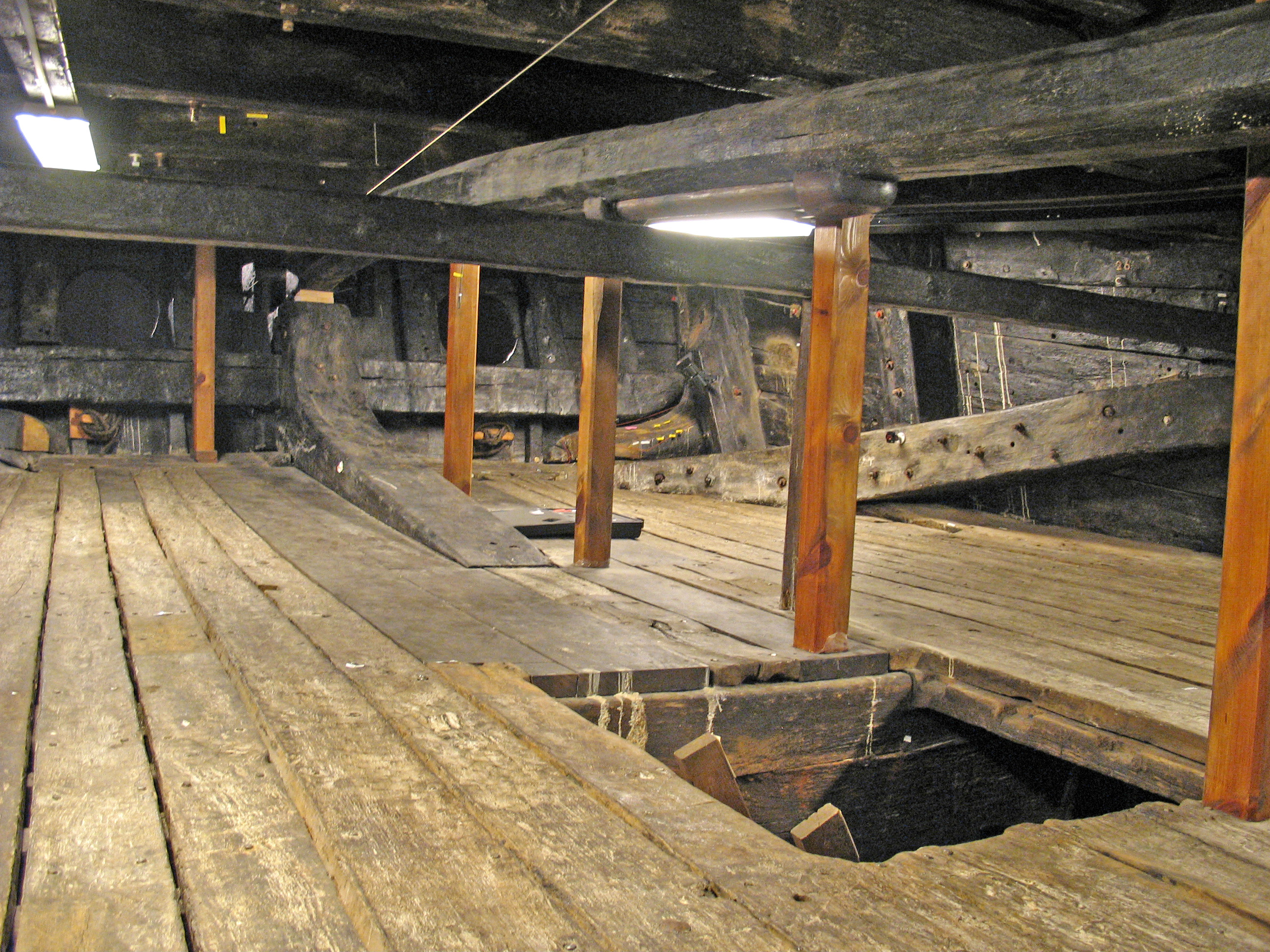
Stern compartment containing the tiller of Swedish warship Vasa

A tiller or till is a lever used to steer a vehicle. The mechanism is primarily used in watercraft, where it is attached to an outboard motor, rudder post or stock to provide leverage in the form of torque for the helmsman to turn the rudder. A tiller may also be used in vehicles outside of water, and was seen in early automobiles. On vessels, a tiller can be used by the helmsman directly pulling or pushing it, but it may also be moved remotely using tiller lines or a ship's wheel. Rapid or excessive movement of the tiller results in an increase in drag and will result in braking or slowing the boat.

== Description ==
A tiller is a lever used to steer a vehicle. It provides leverage in the form of torque to turn the device that changes the direction of the vehicle, such as a rudder on a watercraft or the surface wheels on a wheeled vehicle. A tiller can be used by directly pulling or pushing it, but it may also be moved remotely using a whipstaff, tiller lines, or a ship's wheel, among other variations. (For example, some kayaks have foot pedals that turn a tiller.) Tillers on outboard motors often employ an additional control mechanism where twisting of the shaft is used to vary speed.

== Watercraft ==
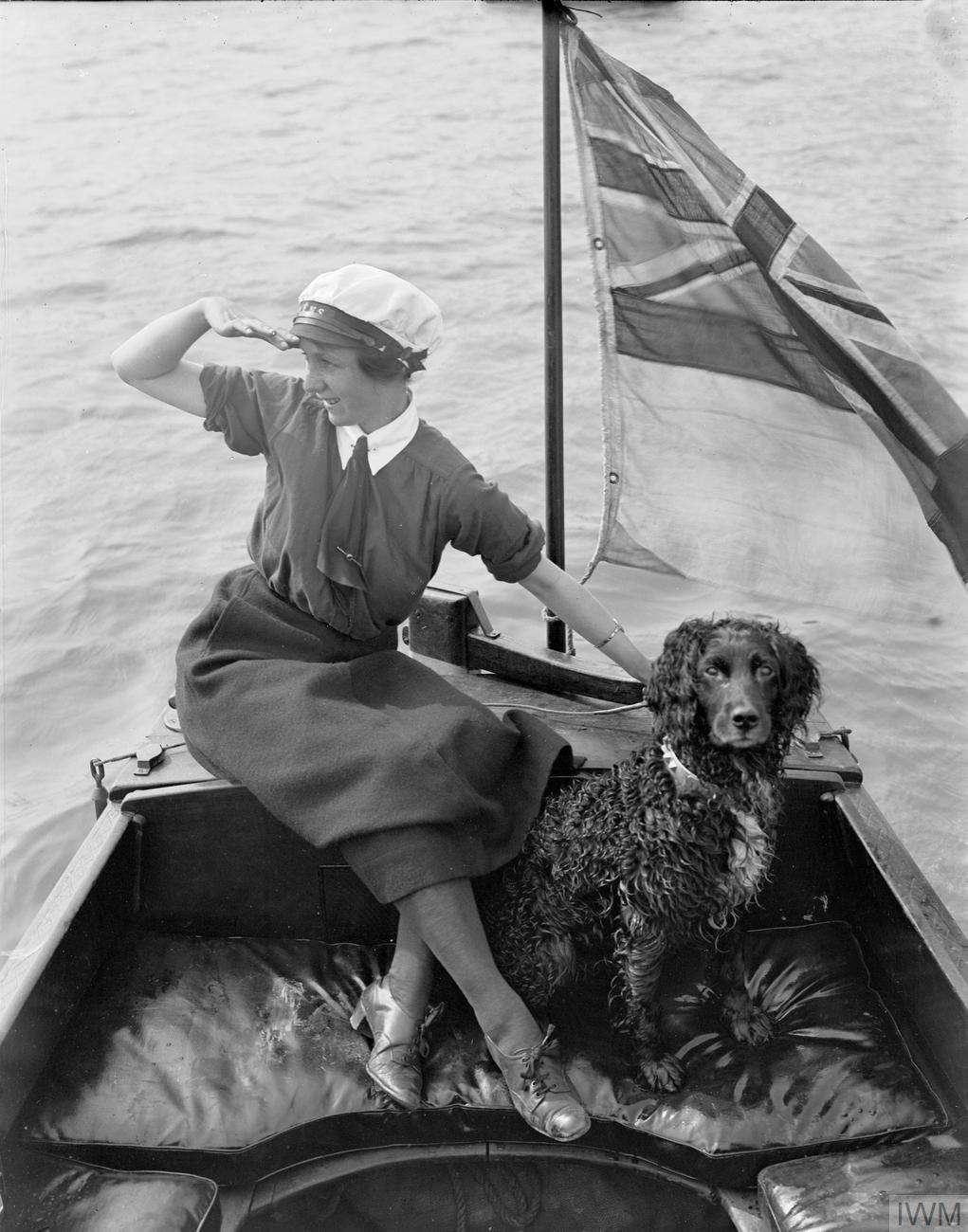
A member of the Women's Royal Naval Service on the tiller of a motor boat during World War I

=== Rudder control ===
In watercraft, the tiller may be attached to a rudder post (American terminology) or rudder stock (English terminology) that provides leverage in the form of torque to turn the rudder. In steering a boat, the tiller is always moved in the direction opposite of which the bow of the boat is to move. If the tiller is moved to port side (left), the bow will turn to starboard (right). If the tiller is moved to starboard (right), the bow will turn port (left). Sailing students often learn the alliterative phrase "Tiller Towards Trouble" to remind them of how to steer. Rapid or excessive movement of the tiller results in an increase in drag and will result in braking or slowing the boat. In the early 1500s the tiller was also referred to as the steering stick.

=== Engine control ===
Some outboard motors may instead have the tiller directly attached and offer controls for engine throttle and prop rotation for forward and reverse.

=== Tiller orders ===
F.1 – With a tiller steering, the helmsman pushes it from port tack to starboard. F.2 – With a steering wheel, the helmsman turns the wheel in the direction where he wants to turn.

Until the current international standards for giving steering orders were defined by the SOLAS Convention of 1929, it was common for steering orders on ships to be given as tiller orders, which dictated to which side of the vessel the tiller was to be moved. Since the tiller is forward of the rudder's pivot point, and the rudder aft of it, the tiller's movement is reversed at the rudder, giving the impression that orders were given "the wrong way round". For example, to turn a ship to port (its left side), the helmsman would be given the order "starboard helm" or "x degrees starboard". The ship's tiller was then moved to starboard, turning the rudder to the vessel's port side, producing a turn to port. The opposite convention applied in France (where tribord—starboard—meant turn to starboard), but Austria and Italy kept to the English system. There was no standardisation in vessels from Scandinavian countries, where the practice varied from ship to ship. Most French vessels with steering wheels had their steering chains reversed and when under the command of a British pilot this could result in confusion.

When large steamships appeared in the late 19th century with telemotors hydraulically connecting the wheel on the bridge to the steering gear at the stern, the practice continued. However, the helmsman was now no longer directly controlling the tiller, and the ship's wheel was simply turned in the desired direction (turn the wheel to port and the ship will go to port). Tiller orders remained however; although many maritime nations had abandoned the convention by the end of the 19th century, Britain retained it until 1933 and the U.S. merchant marine until 1935. One of the reasons for this system continuing, apart from it being a long-established maritime tradition, was that it provided consistency—regardless of whether a vessel was steered directly by the tiller or remotely by a wheel, every vessel had a tiller of some sort and so a tiller order remained true for any vessel. During the transition period the wording of the order was changed, to specify "Wheel to starboard" or "Wheel to port".

A well-known and often-depicted example occurred on the RMS Titanic in 1912 just before she collided with an iceberg. When the iceberg appeared directly in front of the ship, her officer-of-the-watch, First Officer William Murdoch, decided to attempt to clear the iceberg by swinging the ship to its port side. He ordered "Hard-a-Starboard", which was a tiller order directing the helmsman to turn the wheel to port (anti-clockwise) as far as it would go. The Titanic's steering gear then pushed the tiller toward the starboard side of the ship, swinging the rudder over to port and causing the vessel to turn to port. These actions are faithfully portrayed in the 1997 film of the disaster. Although frequently described as an error, the order was given and executed correctly—the vessel struck the iceberg anyway. However, according to the granddaughter of the highest-ranking officer to survive the sinking, Second Officer Charles Lightoller, the order was not correctly executed. Quartermaster Hitchins, who had been trained under rudder orders, mistakenly turned the wheel to starboard. It took two minutes to recognise and correct the error, by which time it was too late to avoid collision with the iceberg. Louise Patten makes the statement in an endnote to her fictional story, Good as Gold.

Although this system seems confusing and contradictory today, to generations of sailors trained on sailing vessels with tiller steering it seemed perfectly logical and was understood by all seafarers. Only when new generations of sailors trained on ships with wheel-and-tiller steering came into the industry was the system replaced.

== Other vehicles ==
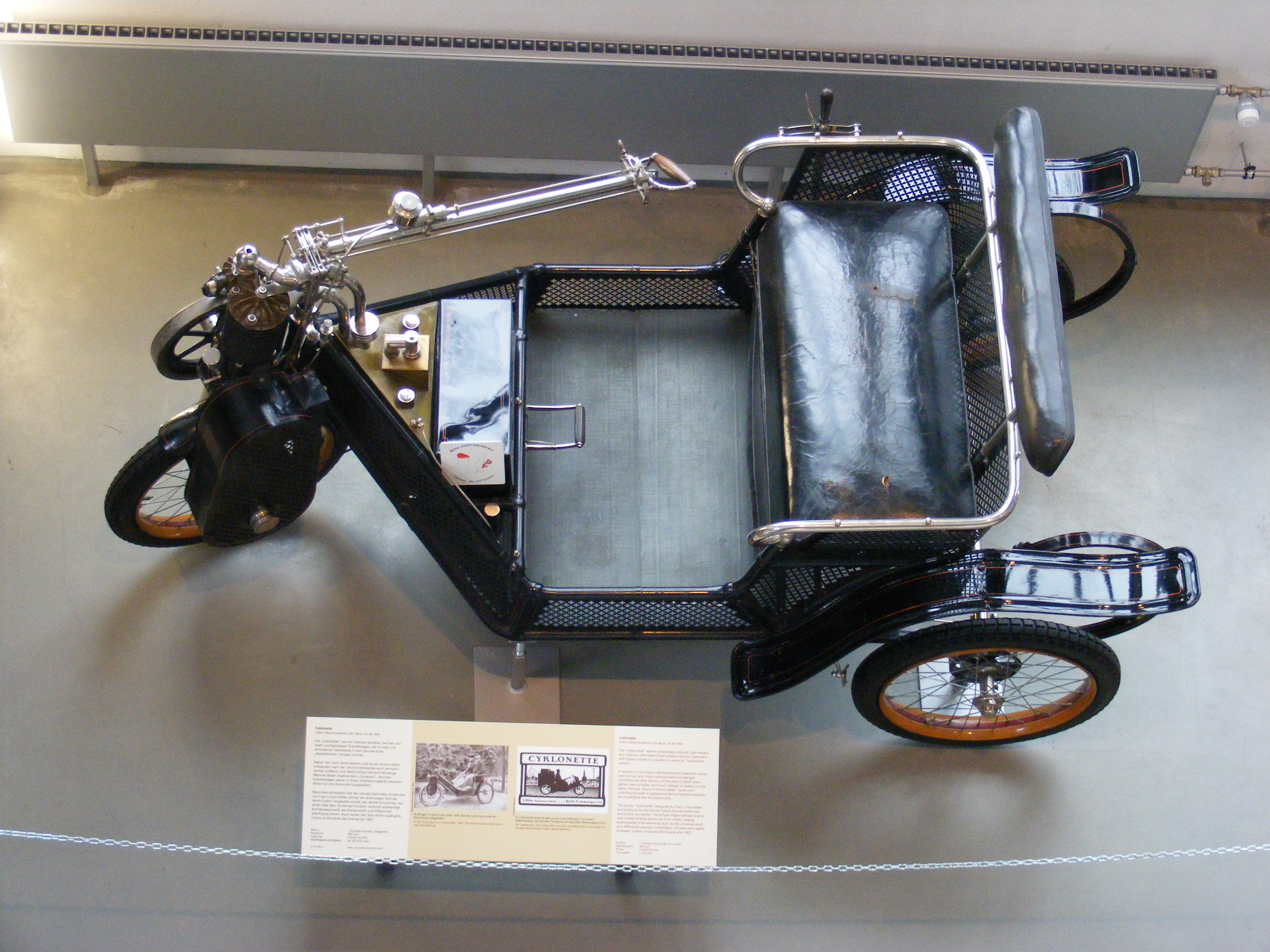
Tiller steering of 1904 Cyklonette

=== Landcraft ===
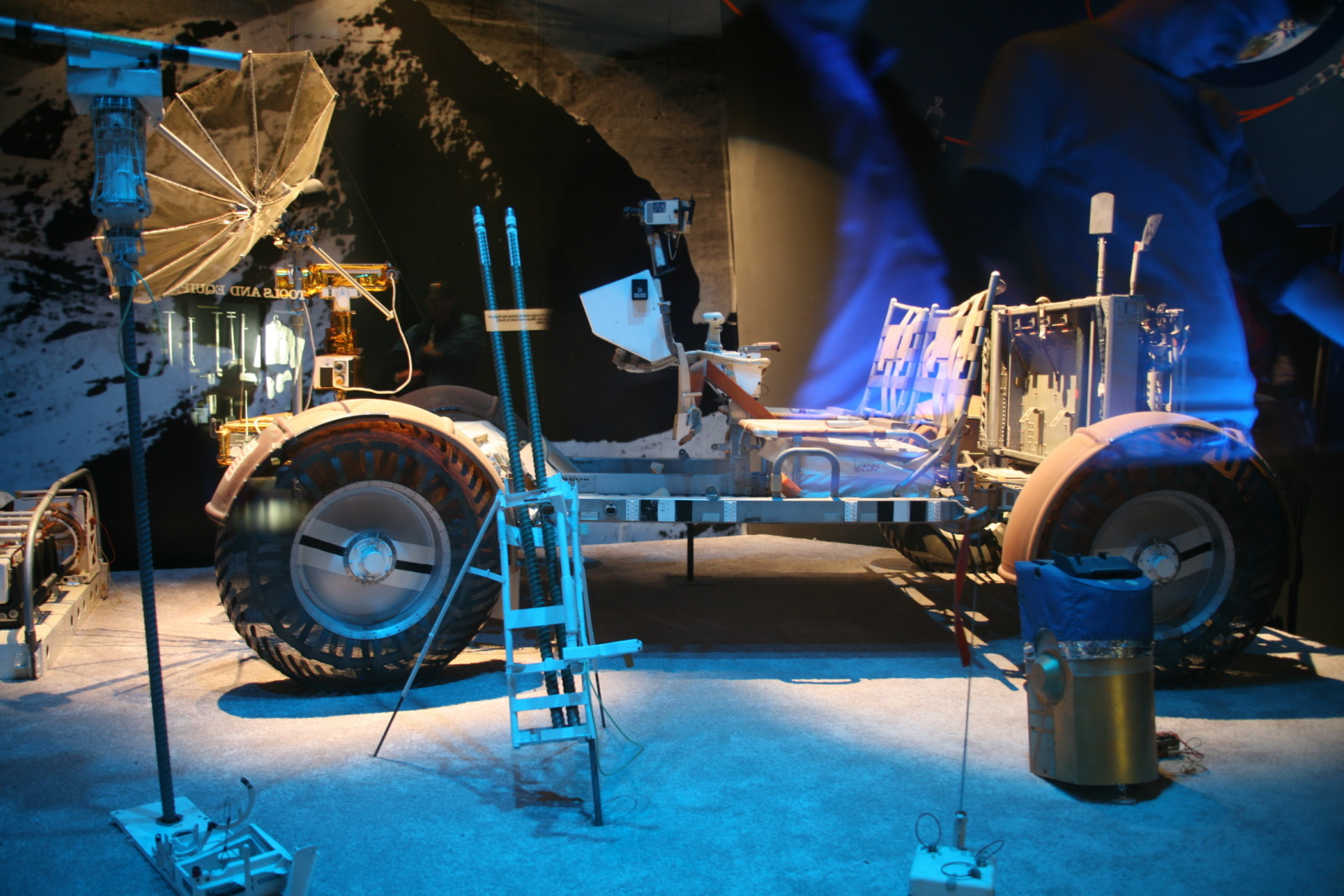
1971 Lunar Roving Vehicle (LRV) with (joy)stick steering controls

The first automobiles were steered with a tiller, which angled the wheels to steer the vehicle. A steering wheel was first used in Europe in 1894 and became standard on French Panhard cars in 1898. Arthur Constantin Krebs replaced the tiller with an inclined steering wheel for the Panhard & Levassor car he designed for the Paris-Amsterdam race which ran from 7–13 July 1898. In the US, Packard introduced a steering wheel on the second car they built, in 1899. By early in the next century, the steering wheel had nearly replaced the tiller in automobiles. However, some automobiles still used tillers into the teens, such as Rauch & Lang Carriage Co., a manufacturer of electric automobiles in Cleveland, Ohio. Lanchester in England also offered tiller steering later than many car manufacturers.

Today, tractor-drawn semi-trailers for ladder trucks are called tiller truck and use a "tiller" (rear steering axle) driver to control the trailer where the aerial ladder is located. Some recumbent bicycles employ tiller steering. The tiller of the electric threewheeler TWIKE – called Joystick – includes buttons for acceleration and electric braking. Mobility scooters are usually fitted with a tiller.

=== Aircraft ===
Most large, transport category airplanes use a device known as a tiller to steer the airplane while taxiing. This usually takes the form of a small steering wheel or lever in the cockpit, often one for the pilot and one for the co-pilot. However, they differ from the tiller on a ship. Rather than move the rudder, the tiller on an airplane steers by turning the nose wheel, and the tiller is moved in the direction of the turn, rather than opposite the turn as on a ship.

== See also ==
- Ship's wheel
- Steering engine
