= James Moran (diplomat) =

European Union Ambassador to Egypt

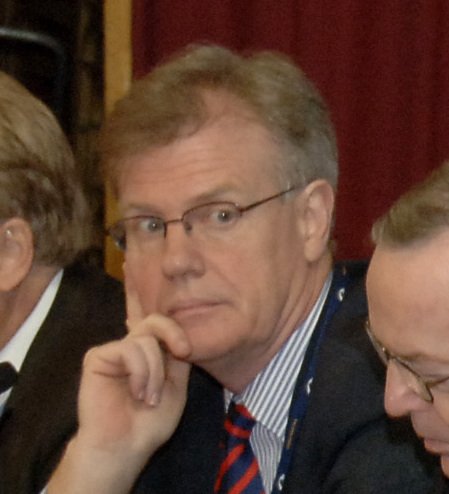
- Moran in 2007
- Education: Keele University
- Occupations: European Union diplomat and former ambassador
- Spouse: Randa
- Children: Layla Moran; Three other children

James Moran is a diplomat and economist, specialising in Middle-Eastern and Asian affairs. He was the European Union's Ambassador to Egypt from 2012 to 2016.

== Biography ==
Moran attended Keele University (where he was president of the students' union), Harvard University and the University of London. He subsequently worked in the private sector and the UK government before joining the European Union's staff in 1983. His early assignments in the EU included working in its delegations to Jamaica and Ethiopia. From 1999 to 2002, he led EU delegations in Jordan and Yemen. Returning to Brussels in 2002, he headed the European Commission's China division before being appointed Asia Director in 2006.

Moving to the new EU external action service, Moran continued as Asia Director from 2006 to 2011 where he negotiated a number of EU partnership agreements. He then became the Union's senior coordinator in Libya in 2011, where he established the EU delegation in Tripoli following the revolution, and helped launch the first European assistance programmes there.

== Personal life ==
He and his wife Randa have four children, including British Liberal Democrat Member of Parliament Layla Moran.
