= Layla Moran =

British politician (born 1982)

Layla Moran MP
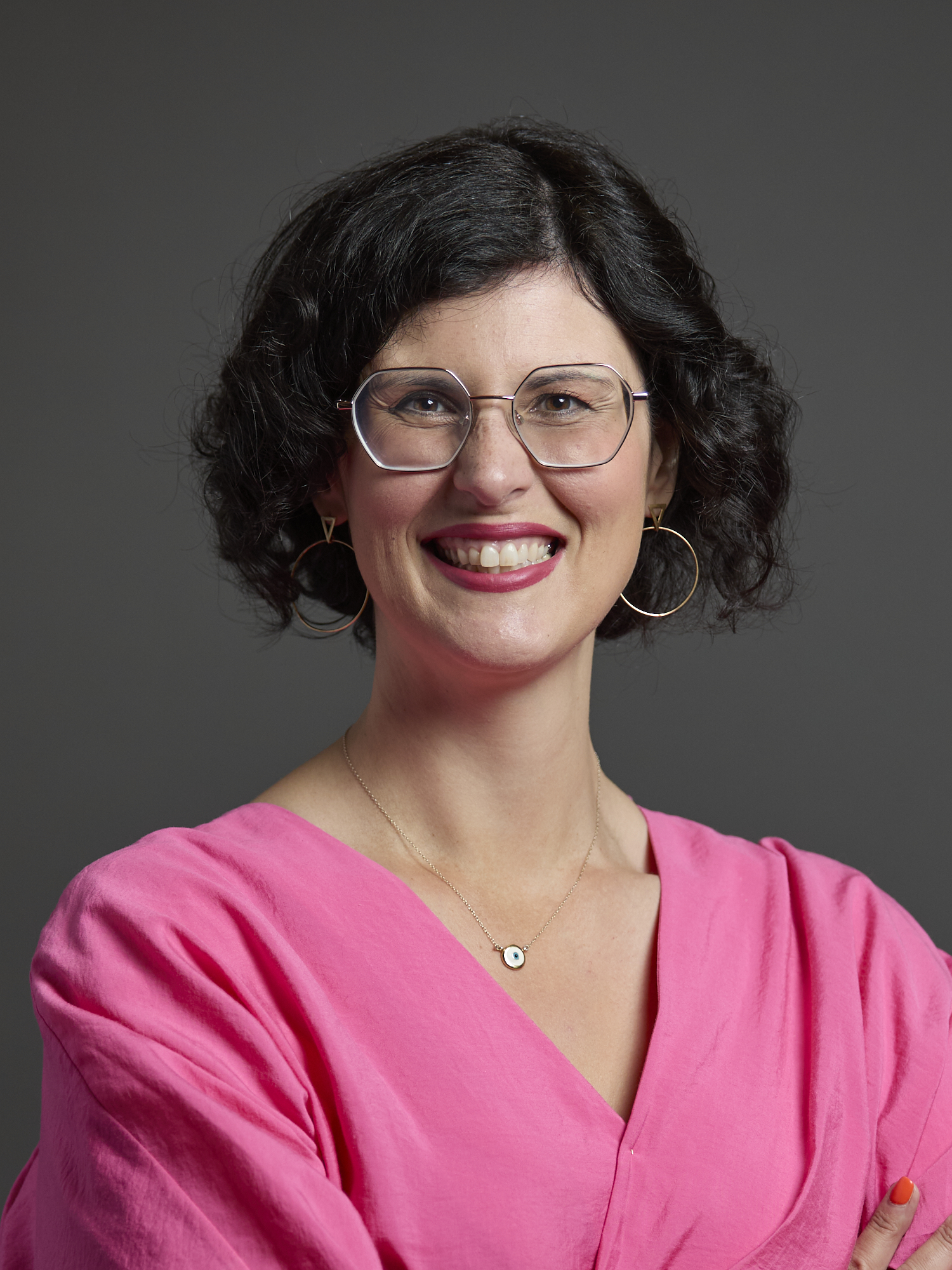
- Official portrait, 2024

Chair of the Health and Social Care Select Committee
- Incumbent
- Assumed office 9 September 2024 (Note: Paulette Hamilton served as Interim Chair from 30 April 2025 to 13 October 2025.)
- Preceded by: Steve Brine

Member of Parliament for Oxford West and Abingdon
- Incumbent
- Assumed office 8 June 2017
- Preceded by: Nicola Blackwood
- Majority: 14,894 (32.4%)

Liberal Democrat portfolios
- 2023–2024: Science, Innovation and Technology
- 2020–2024: Foreign, Commonwealth and Development Affairs
- 2019–2020: Digital, Culture, Media and Sport
- 2017–2020: Education

Personal details
- Born: Layla Michelle Moran; 12 September 1982 (age 44) Hammersmith, London, England
- Party: Liberal Democrats
- Domestic partner: Rosy Cobb
- Parent: James Moran (father)
- Education: Imperial College London (BSc); Brunel University London (PGCE); Institute of Education (MA)

Layla Michelle Moran (/məˈræn/ mə-RAN; born 12 September 1982) is a British Liberal Democrat politician. She has served as the Chair of the Health and Social Care Select Committee since September 2024, and has been Member of Parliament (MP) for Oxford West and Abingdon since 2017.

Moran worked as a maths and physics teacher. She unsuccessfully campaigned as the Liberal Democrat candidate in Battersea at the 2010 general election; in the West Central constituency at the 2012 London Assembly election; and in Oxford West and Abingdon at the 2015 general election. Moran was selected for the seat again at the 2017 general election and was elected to the House of Commons, defeating Conservative MP Nicola Blackwood.

She was the Liberal Democrat spokesperson for the Department for Education under three leaders from 2017 to 2020, and was spokesperson for the Department for Digital, Culture, Media and Sport from 2019 to 2020. After Jo Swinson lost her seat at the 2019 general election, Moran stood to become the leader of the Liberal Democrats in the 2020 leadership election, which she lost to acting leader Ed Davey. On 31 August 2020, Davey appointed Moran as the Liberal Democrats' shadow foreign secretary, and as international development spokesperson the following day. She served in these roles until her election as Chair of the Health and Social Care Select Committee.

Moran came out as pansexual in 2020 and is the first UK parliamentarian to do so. She is the first MP of Palestinian descent.

== Early life and career ==
Moran was born on 12 September 1982 in Hammersmith, the elder daughter of diplomat James Moran and Randa Moran, a Christian Palestinian from Jerusalem.

Her great-grandfather was the Palestinian writer Wasif Jawhariyyeh, who published extensive memoirs. Moran describes herself as British-Palestinian. On her upbringing, Moran said "My Palestinian background has made me interested at a global level. Politics was always at the dinner table; it primed me to engage." Baptised and raised in the Greek Orthodox Church, Moran now identifies as a humanist.

As her father was a diplomat for the European Union, Moran grew up in various countries, including Belgium, Greece, Ethiopia, Jamaica and Jordan. She attended private schools in Brussels, and Kingston, before going to Roedean School in Brighton. From 2000 to 2003, she studied physics at Imperial College London, and from 2005 to 2007 completed a PGCE at Brunel University London. From 2007 to 2008, she studied for a master's degree in comparative education at the Institute of Education (now the UCL Institute of Education).

From 2003 to 2012, Moran was a maths and physics teacher at the International School of Brussels, and at two schools in London: Queensmead School and Southbank International School. Between 2009 and 2013 she worked as a part-time course tutor for Oxford Study Courses, a company that helps International Baccalaureate teachers and students, and from 2013 she was full-time academic manager.

== Parliamentary career ==
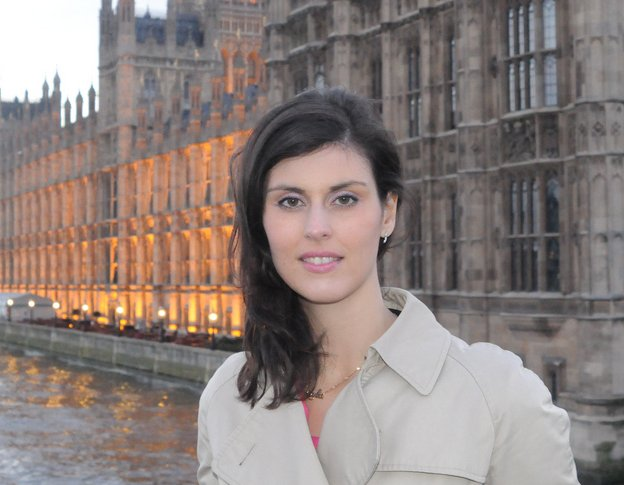
Layla Moran in 2010

Moran was selected as the Liberal Democrat candidate for Battersea at the 2010 general election, coming third with 14.7% of the vote behind the Conservative candidate Jane Ellison and the Labour candidate Martin Linton. She also stood as a candidate for the West Central constituency in the 2012 London Assembly election, coming fourth with 6.9% of the vote behind the Conservative incumbent Kit Malthouse, and the Labour and Green Party candidates.

Moran contested Oxford West and Abingdon at the 2015 general election, coming second with 28.9% of the vote behind the incumbent Conservative MP Nicola Blackwood. She was selected for the seat again at the snap 2017 general election and was elected with 43.7% of the vote and a majority of 816. Moran became the first UK Member of Parliament of Palestinian descent and the first female Liberal Democrat MP from an ethnic minority background.

In June 2017, Moran was named Liberal Democrat spokesperson for education, science and young people in the House of Commons. That month she used her maiden speech to call for fairer funding for schools, and in July 2017 she spoke out against the closure of all the Sure Start children's centres in Oxfordshire earlier in the year. Also in July 2017, Moran was jeered at for accusing the Conservatives of underfunding a new scheme to provide 30 hours of free child care for the children of working parents. Later in 2017, she was appointed a member of the Public Accounts Committee, which is responsible for overseeing government expenditure.

In May 2019, Moran announced that, being a relatively new MP, she would not be running in the 2019 Liberal Democrats leadership election. She had been considered a frontrunner to replace Vince Cable as leader, following his announcement in September 2018 that he intended to step down from the post.

At the 2019 general election, Moran was re-elected as MP for Oxford West and Abingdon with an increased vote share of 53.3% and an increased majority of 8,943.

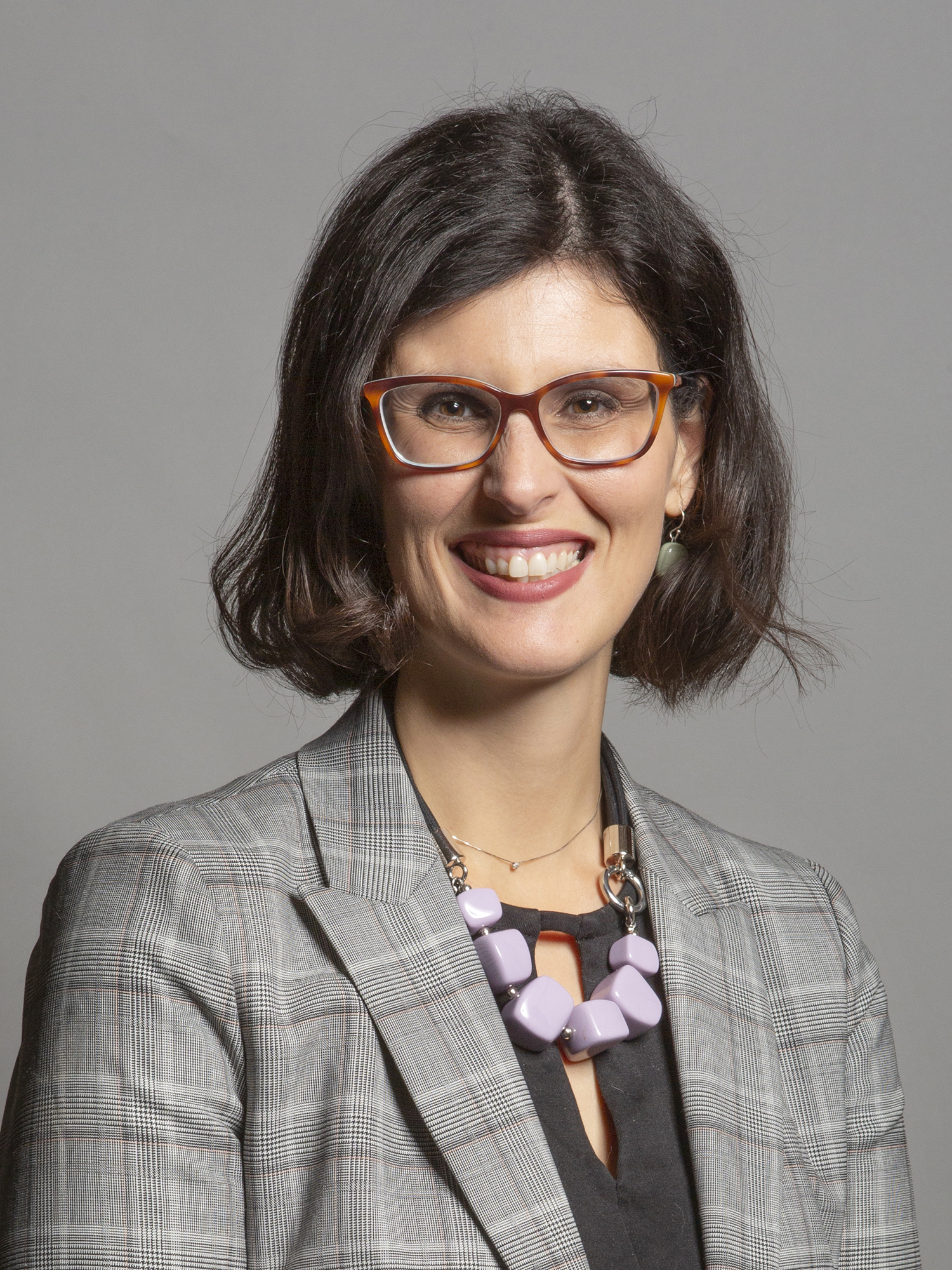
MP portrait, 2020

In March 2020, Moran announced that she would be running in the 2020 leadership election. Moran finished in second place with 35.6% of the vote, losing to Ed Davey, the acting co-leader.

Moran has called for a full review of the GCSE history curriculum. She argues that to tackle institutional racism in society, students must be taught of Britain's colonial past and the injustices that took place within it. In 2020 over 250,000 people signed a petition calling for 'Britain's colonial history to be made a compulsory part of the curriculum' which prompted Moran and 30 other cross-party MPs to apply greater pressure on the government to make significant changes to the history curriculum.

In 2021, Moran was one of three MPs who successfully took legal action against the Department of Health and Social Care over contracts awarded during the COVID-19 pandemic.

On 9 September 2024, Layla Moran was elected as Chair of the Health and Social Care Select Committee.

== Political positions ==
=== Environment ===
Moran has stated that she supports action on climate change, and in 2021 was the only Oxfordshire MP to support the Climate and Ecological Emergency Bill. In 2023, she campaigned against solar farms in her constituency, stating that it would lead to the "permanent industrialisation of the Green Belt".

=== European Union ===
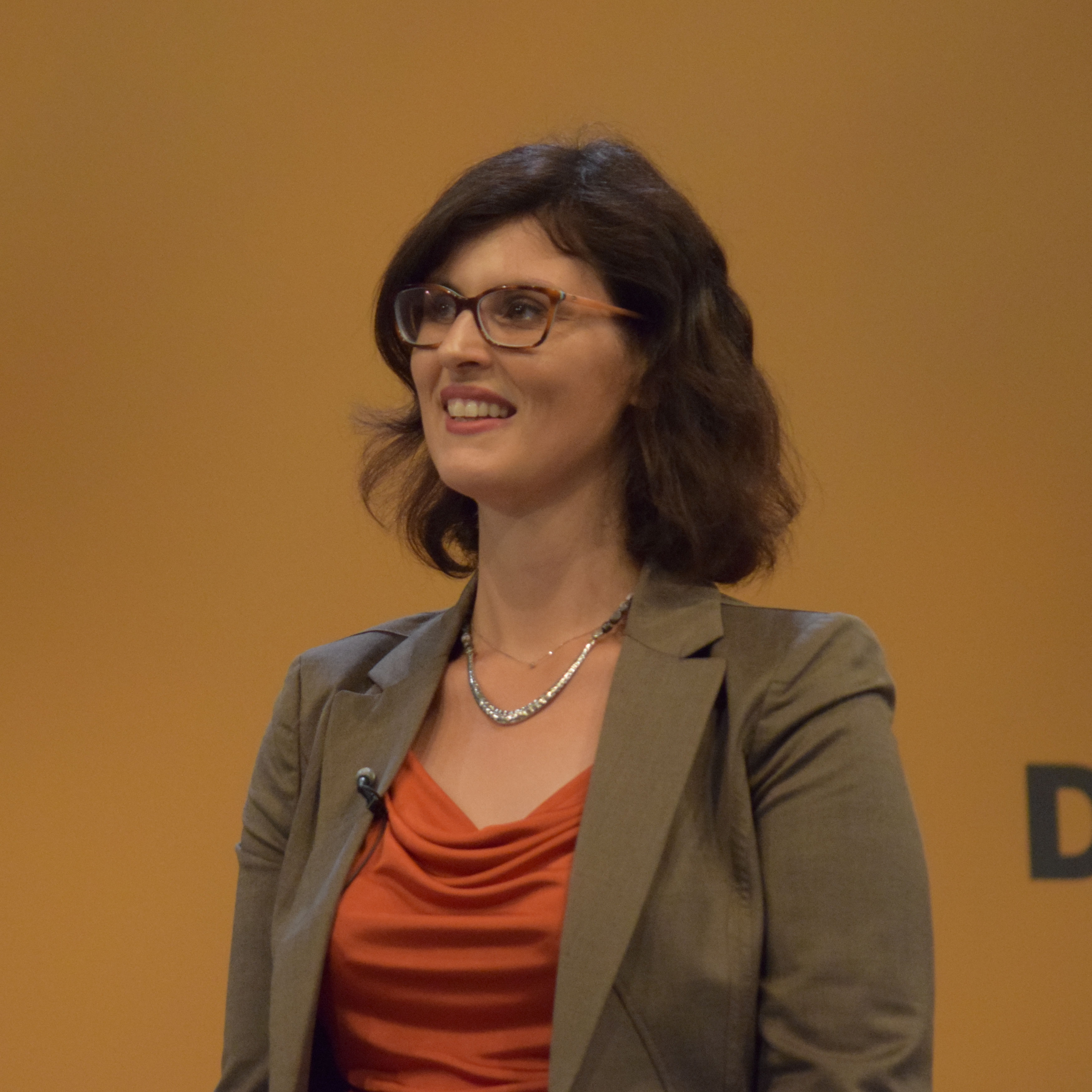
Moran addressing the 2018 Liberal Democrat conference in the Brighton Centre

Moran opposed Brexit and supported a second referendum on EU membership. Despite her opposition to Brexit, after the 2019 general election, she said that a Liberal Democrat policy to cancel the departure without a second referendum was a mistake.

=== Foreign policy ===
Moran opposed the 2003 invasion of Iraq. She opposed cuts to foreign aid to Yemen and has been critical of Saudi Arabian-led intervention in that country.

Moran believes that the United Kingdom should announce recognition of the State of Palestine. She called out the names of the children killed in the 2021 Israel–Palestine crisis in Parliament. Following the 2023 attacks on Israel by Hamas, Moran appeared and spoke at vigils for Israeli victims in Oxford and denounced Hamas as a terrorist organisation.

Moran supported an inquiry into the disappearances of Mohammed Bin Nayef and Prince Ahmed Bin Abdulaziz of Saudi Arabia. She is critical of the arms trade between Britain and Saudi Arabia, and is a critic of Russia. In February 2022, she used the cover of Parliamentary privilege to name the Navalny 35, Russian oligarchs and allies of Vladimir Putin, who she said should have sanctions imposed on them.

Moran is a supporter of Nazanin Zaghari-Ratcliffe and in 2018 called for her release from prison in Iran.

During the Gaza war, she has advocated allowing humanitarian aid into the Gaza Strip and urged the then Prime Minister, Rishi Sunak to take a stronger stance regarding the humanitarian crisis. Furthermore, she has advocated a permanent ceasefire, citing in December 2023 the desperate situation of her own family members trapped in Gaza. Moran welcomed the UK's formal recognition of the State of Palestine on 21 September 2025, describing it as a promise fulfilled to her great-grandfather, and advocated more concrete action from Parliament, including stopping trade with illegal settlers in the occupied Palestine territories, ceasing arms sales to Israel, and giving resources to the Foreign Office to broker a peace deal.

=== Housing ===
In 2020, Moran campaigned against a proposal to build 11,000 new homes in Oxford by 2036. In 2023, she urged voters to vote tactically for the Green Party in order to block increases in housing supply in her constituency.

== Personal life ==
In an interview with The Times, Moran stated that she suffered from depression when she was a student and attributed it to a negative self-image resulting from the social stigma of obesity. She underwent stomach-stapling surgery to assist her in losing weight.

In 2013, Moran and her then-boyfriend, Richard Davis, were briefly questioned by police after she slapped him during an argument in their hotel room at the national Liberal Democrat Conference. She was charged with domestic violence but the case was subsequently dropped.

On 2 January 2020, Moran revealed in an interview with PinkNews that she is pansexual; she is believed to be the first UK parliamentarian to come out as pansexual. Moran also disclosed that she was in a relationship with former Liberal Democrat press officer Rosy Cobb. The couple live in West Oxfordshire.

During the Gaza war, Moran stated in October 2023 that she had extended family stranded in Gaza City. On 15 November 2023, she said during a debate in parliament that a family member had died in Gaza.

In May 2025, Moran announced the birth of her first child and that she would be taking parental leave for about five months. Moran's baby was born at the John Radcliffe Hospital in Oxford.

Parliament of the United Kingdom
| Preceded by Nicola Blackwood | Member of Parliament for Oxford West and Abingdon; 2017–present | Incumbent |
