= Oxford West and Abingdon =

UK Parliament constituency (since 1983)

Coordinates: 51.73°N 1.29°W

- County constituency for the House of Commons
- Boundaries since 2024
- Boundary of Oxford West and Abingdon in South East England
- County: Oxfordshire
- Electorate: 72,004 (2023)
- Major settlements: Oxford (7 wards); Abingdon

Current constituency
- Created: 1983
- Member of Parliament: Layla Moran (Liberal Democrats)
- Seats: One
- Created from: Oxford; Abingdon

Oxford West and Abingdon is a constituency (Note: A county constituency (for the purposes of election expenses and type of returning officer).) represented in the House of Commons of the UK Parliament since 2017 by Layla Moran, a Liberal Democrat. (Note: As with all UK Parliament constituencies, the constituency elects one Member of Parliament (MP) by the first past the post system of election at least every five years.)

== Constituency profile ==
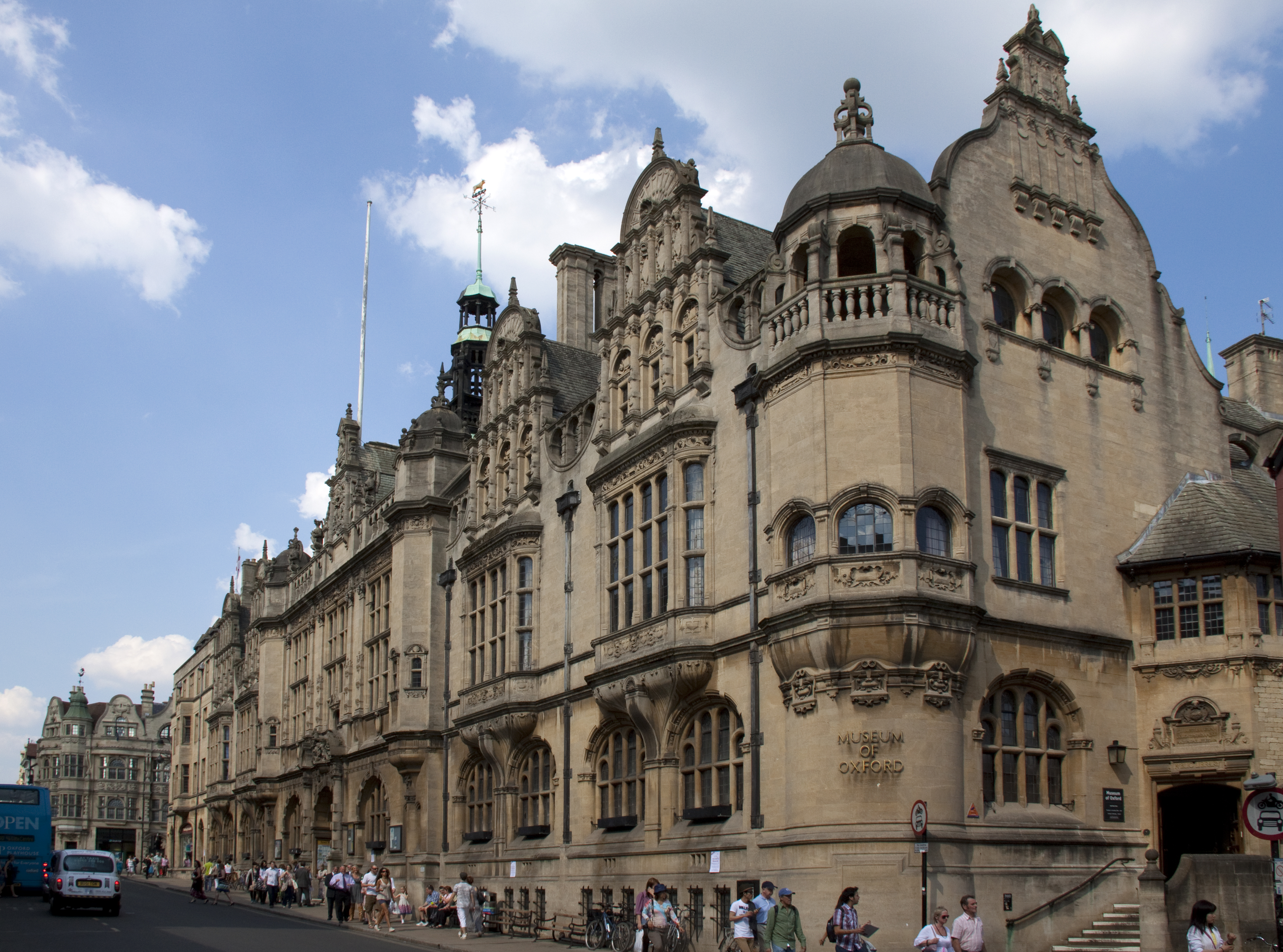
Oxford Town Hall

Oxford West and Abingdon is a constituency in Oxfordshire in South East England, covering parts of the City of Oxford and Vale of White Horse local government districts. It covers Oxford city centre and the residential neighbourhoods to its north, including North Oxford, Jericho, Summertown and Cutteslowe. It then stretches south-west to include the suburban villages of Botley, North Hinksey and Kennington, the town of Abingdon-on-Thames and some smaller rural villages.

Oxford is a cathedral city and popular tourist destination known for its university, one of the oldest in the world, and its historic architecture. Oxford University and its numerous colleges take up most of the city centre, with around 27,000 students registered at the institution. Abingdon is a historic market town located around 6 miles (9.7 km) south of Oxford and has a history of rural industry, including the trade of wool and other textiles. This constituency is one of the country's most affluent, especially so in the centre of Oxford and in the suburban neighbourhoods of Abingdon. House prices are generally higher than the rest of South East England and the average price is nearly double the overall UK average.

Oxford West and Abingdon has a large student population and below-average proportions of middle-aged and older adults. Residents have high levels of income but below-average rates of homeownership. The child poverty rate is less than half the UK-wide figure. Residents are very well-educated and a high proportion work in the education and technology sectors. The percentage claiming unemployment benefits is very low. White people made up 83% of the population at the 2021 census, around one-sixth of whom were of non-British origin. Asians were 9% of residents, with people of Chinese origin being the largest Asian group.

At the local council level, Oxford is represented by Labour Party and Green Party councillors in the city centre and Liberal Democrats in the northern suburbs. Abingdon and the rural areas elected Liberal Democrats. Voters in Oxford West and Abingdon strongly supported remaining in the European Union in the 2016 referendum; an estimated 66% voted in favour of remaining compared to the UK-wide figure of 48%.

== History ==
=== Creation ===
The seat was created in 1983 as part of the reconfiguration of those in the county to avoid malapportionment, abolishing Oxford as a seat. It merged about half the city with the eastern portion of the former Abingdon seat.

=== MPs ===
Conservative John Patten (MP for Oxford in the 1979–1983 Parliament), held the seat from its creation until he retired in 1997. The seat was gained by Liberal Democrat, Evan Harris, who held the seat for thirteen years until the 2010 general election, when the Conservative Nicola Blackwood retook the seat in one of the most marginal results of that election. Blackwood held the seat until the 2017 general election, when she was defeated by Liberal Democrat Layla Moran in another marginal result. Moran retained the seat at the 2019 general election with a much increased majority of 15.2%.

=== Contests ===
The seat has been contested nine times, each of them general elections. At each contest, the Labour party candidate has polled third, with the peak share of votes to date being 20.2% in 1997. The strongest victory, in share of the vote, was that of Harris of the Liberal Democrats in 2001, a 17.8% majority (in a seven-way contest).

The Green Party and its predecessor, the Ecology Party, stood in the first eight contests, in each losing the deposit paid.

In December 2023, the Labour Party included the seat in its published list of 211 non-battleground seats, suggesting they did not see it as winnable.

== Boundaries and boundary changes ==
=== 1983–1997 ===
- The District of Vale of White Horse wards of Abbey, Caldecott, Cumnor, Fitzharris, Hinksey, Kennington, Northcourt, Ock, Radley, St Helen Without, and Sunningwell and Wootton; and
- The City of Oxford wards of Central, Cherwell, North, South, West, and Wolvercote.

The majority of the new constituency, comprising the town of Abingdon-on-Thames and areas to the west of Oxford, was previously part of the abolished constituency of Abingdon in Berkshire. The City of Oxford wards had previously been in the abolished constituency of Oxford.

=== 1997–2010 ===
- The District of Vale of White Horse wards of Abbey, Caldecott, Cumnor, Fitzharris, Hinksey, Kennington, Northcourt, Ock, Radley, St Helen Without, and Sunningwell and Wootton;
- The City of Oxford wards of Central, Cherwell, North, West, and Wolvercote; and
- The District of Cherwell wards of Gosford, North West Kidlington, and South East Kidlington.

Kidlington was transferred from Witney. The South ward of the City of Oxford was transferred to Oxford East.

=== 2010–2024 ===
Map of 2010-2024 boundaries

- The District of Vale of White Horse wards of Abingdon Abbey and Barton, Abingdon Caldecott, Abingdon Dunmore, Abingdon Fitzharris, Abingdon Northcourt, Abingdon Ock Meadow, Abingdon Peachcroft, Appleton and Cumnor, Kennington and South Hinksey, North Hinksey and Wytham, Radley, and Sunningwell and Wootton;
- The City of Oxford wards of Jericho and Osney, North, St Margaret's, Summertown, and Wolvercote; and
- The District of Cherwell wards of Kidlington North, Kidlington South, and Yarnton, Gosford and Water Eaton.

Further loss to Oxford East, including the city centre, following revision of City of Oxford wards; marginal realignment of boundary with Wantage; Yarnton transferred from Witney.

=== 2024–present ===
Further to the 2023 Periodic Review of Westminster constituencies which became effective for the 2024 general election, the constituency is composed of the following (as they existed on 1 December 2020):

- The City of Oxford wards of: Carfax & Jericho; Cutteslowe & Sunnymead; Holywell; Osney & St. Thomas; Summertown; Walton Manor; Wolvercote.
- The District of Vale of White Horse wards of: Abingdon Abbey Northcourt; Abingdon Caldecott; Abingdon Dunmore; Abingdon Fitzharris; Abingdon Peachcroft; Botley & Sunningwell; Cumnor; Kennington & Radley; Marcham; Wootton.

The electorate was reduced to bring it within the permitted range by transferring Kidlington to the newly created constituency of Bicester and Woodstock. To partly compensate, Oxford city centre and University colleges were moved back in from Oxford East. In addition, the village of Marcham was transferred from Wantage.

== Members of Parliament ==
Election	Member	Party
1983	John Patten	Conservative
1997	Evan Harris	Liberal Democrats
2010	Nicola Blackwood	Conservative
2017	Layla Moran	Liberal Democrats

== Elections ==
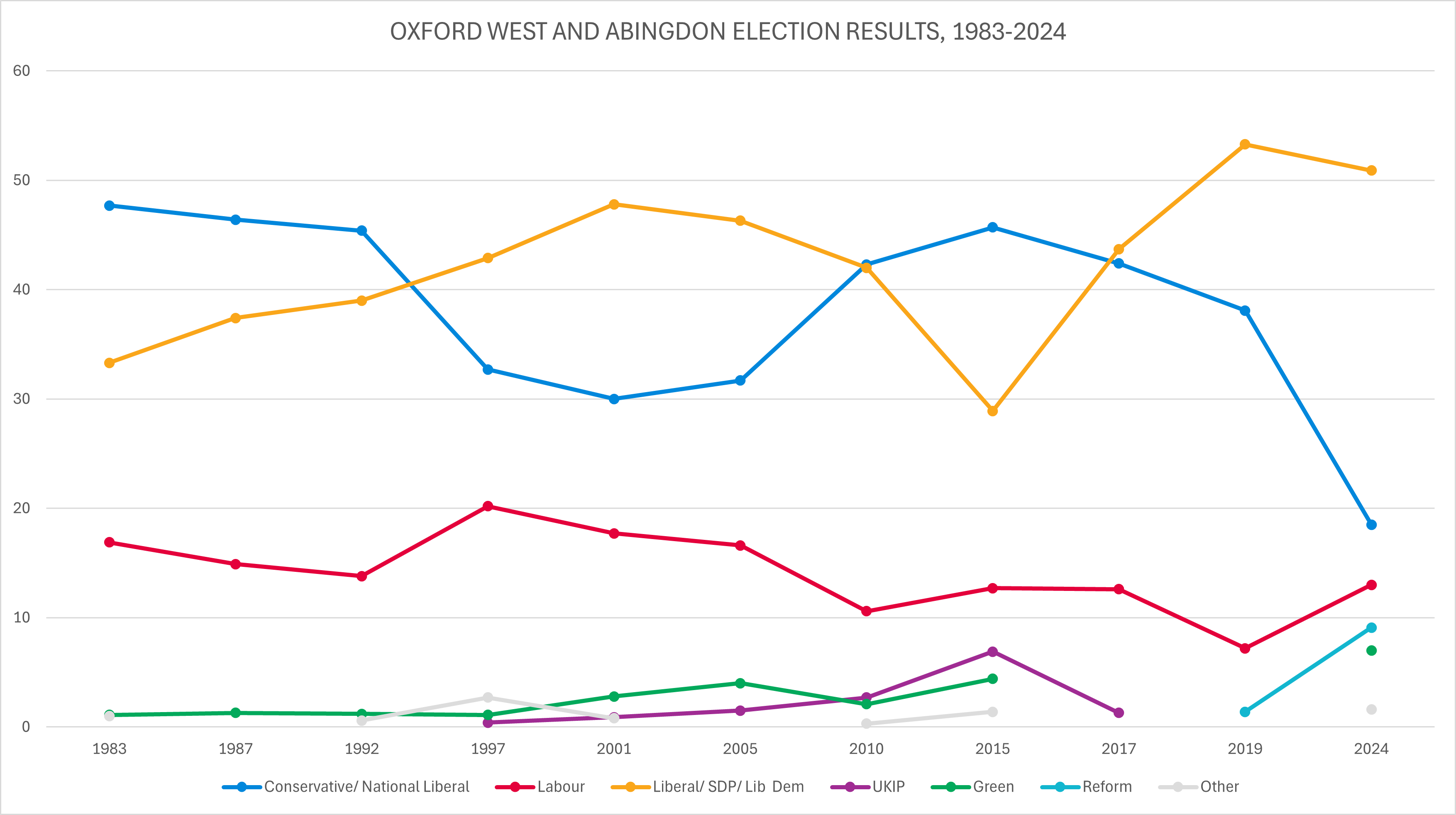
Election results 1983-2024

=== Elections in the 2020s ===
General election 2024: Oxford West and Abingdon
Party	Candidate	Votes	%	±%
Liberal Democrats	Layla Moran	23,414	50.9	−1.3
Conservative	Vinay Raniga	8,520	18.5	−15.6
Labour	Stephen Webb	5,981	13.0	+1.2
Reform	James Gunn	4,164	9.1	+7.6
Green	Chris Goodall	3,236	7.0	+6.5
SDP	Anni Byard	259	0.6	N/A
CPA	Ian Shelley	256	0.6	N/A
Independent	Josh Phillips	168	0.4	N/A
Majority		14,894	32.4	+14.3
Turnout		45,998	64.5	–9.0
Registered electors		71,318		
Liberal Democrats hold		Swing	▲7.2	

=== Elections in the 2010s ===
2019 notional result
Party	Vote	%
Liberal Democrats	27,616	52.2
Conservative	18,039	34.1
Labour	6,242	11.8
Brexit Party	769	1.5
Green	249	0.5
Turnout	52,915	73.5
Electorate	72,004	

General election 2019: Oxford West and Abingdon
Party	Candidate	Votes	%	±%
Liberal Democrats	Layla Moran	31,340	53.3	+9.6
Conservative	James Fredrickson	22,397	38.1	–4.3
Labour	Rosie Sourbut	4,258	7.2	–5.4
Brexit Party	Allison Wild	829	1.4	N/A
Majority		8,943	15.2	+13.9
Turnout		58,824	76.4	–3.2
Liberal Democrats hold		Swing	+6.9	

General election 2017: Oxford West and Abingdon
Party	Candidate	Votes	%	±%
Liberal Democrats	Layla Moran	26,256	43.7	+14.8
Conservative	Nicola Blackwood	25,440	42.4	–3.3
Labour	Marie Tidball	7,573	12.6	–0.1
UKIP	Alan Harris	751	1.3	–5.6
Majority		816	1.3	N/A
Turnout		60,020	79.6	+4.4
Liberal Democrats gain from Conservative		Swing	+9.1	

General election 2015: Oxford West and Abingdon
Party	Candidate	Votes	%	±%
Conservative	Nicola Blackwood	26,153	45.7	+3.4
Liberal Democrats	Layla Moran	16,571	28.9	–13.1
Labour	Sally Copley	7,274	12.7	+2.1
UKIP	Alan Harris	3,963	6.9	+4.2
Green	Larry Sanders	2,497	4.4	+2.3
NHA	Helen Salisbury	723	1.3	N/A
Socialist (GB)	Mike Foster	66	0.1	N/A
Majority		9,582	16.7	+16.4
Turnout		57,247	75.2	+5.0
Conservative hold		Swing	+8.2	

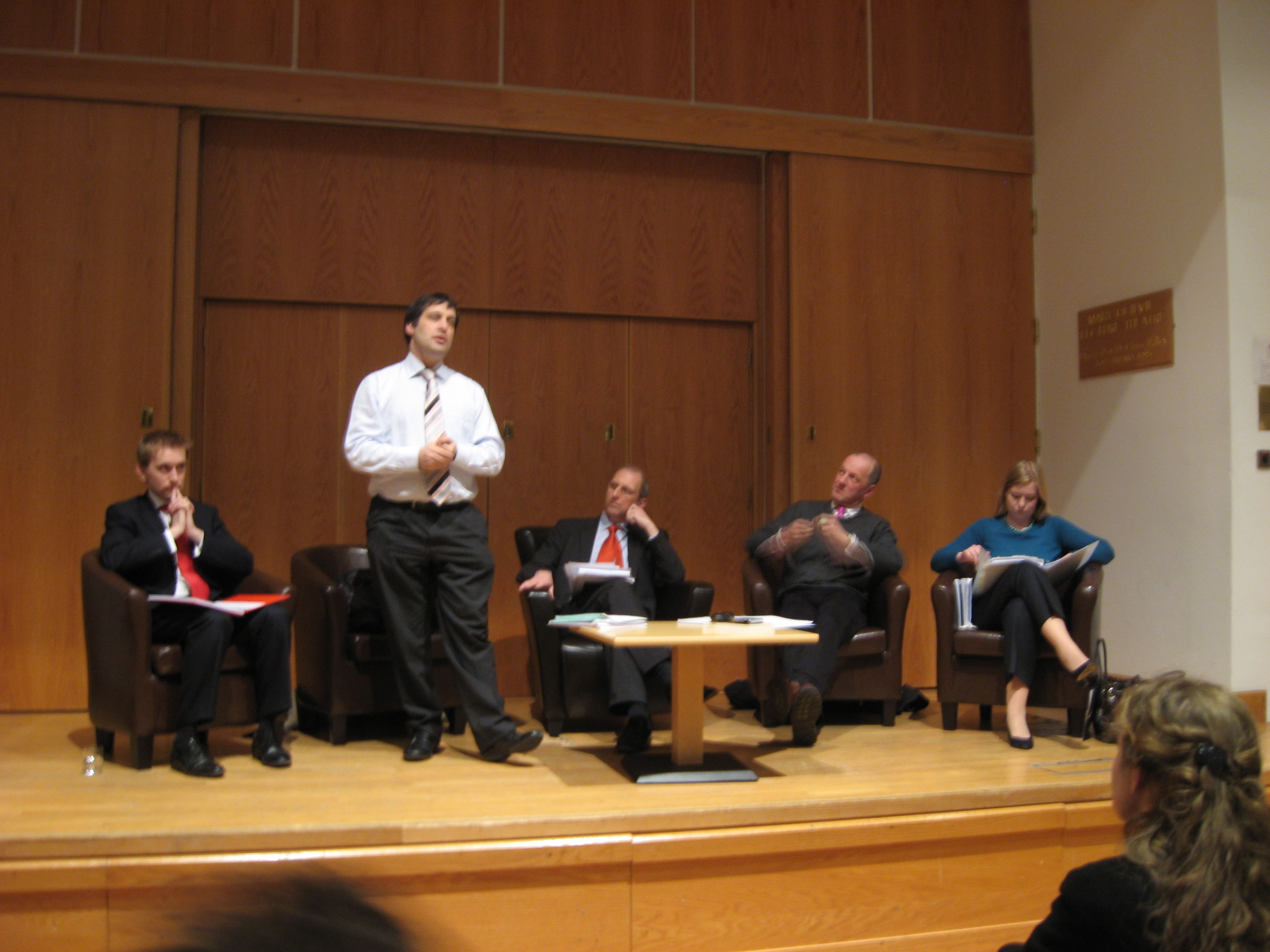
A pre-election husting at the Oxford West and Abingdon constituency during the 2010 campaign. From left to right: Richard Stevens, Evan Harris (standing, incumbent), Tim Gardam (chair, Principal of St Anne's College), Chris Goodall, Nicola Blackwood.

General election 2010: Oxford West and Abingdon
Party	Candidate	Votes	%	±%
Conservative	Nicola Blackwood	23,906	42.3	+9.6
Liberal Democrats	Evan Harris	23,730	42.0	–4.1
Labour	Richard Stevens	5,999	10.6	–5.2
UKIP	Paul Williams	1,518	2.7	+1.2
Green	Chris Goodall	1,184	2.1	–1.7
Animal Protection	Keith Mann	143	0.3	N/A
Majority		176	0.3	N/A
Turnout		56,480	70.2	+3.0
Conservative gain from Liberal Democrats		Swing	+6.9	

=== Elections in the 2000s ===
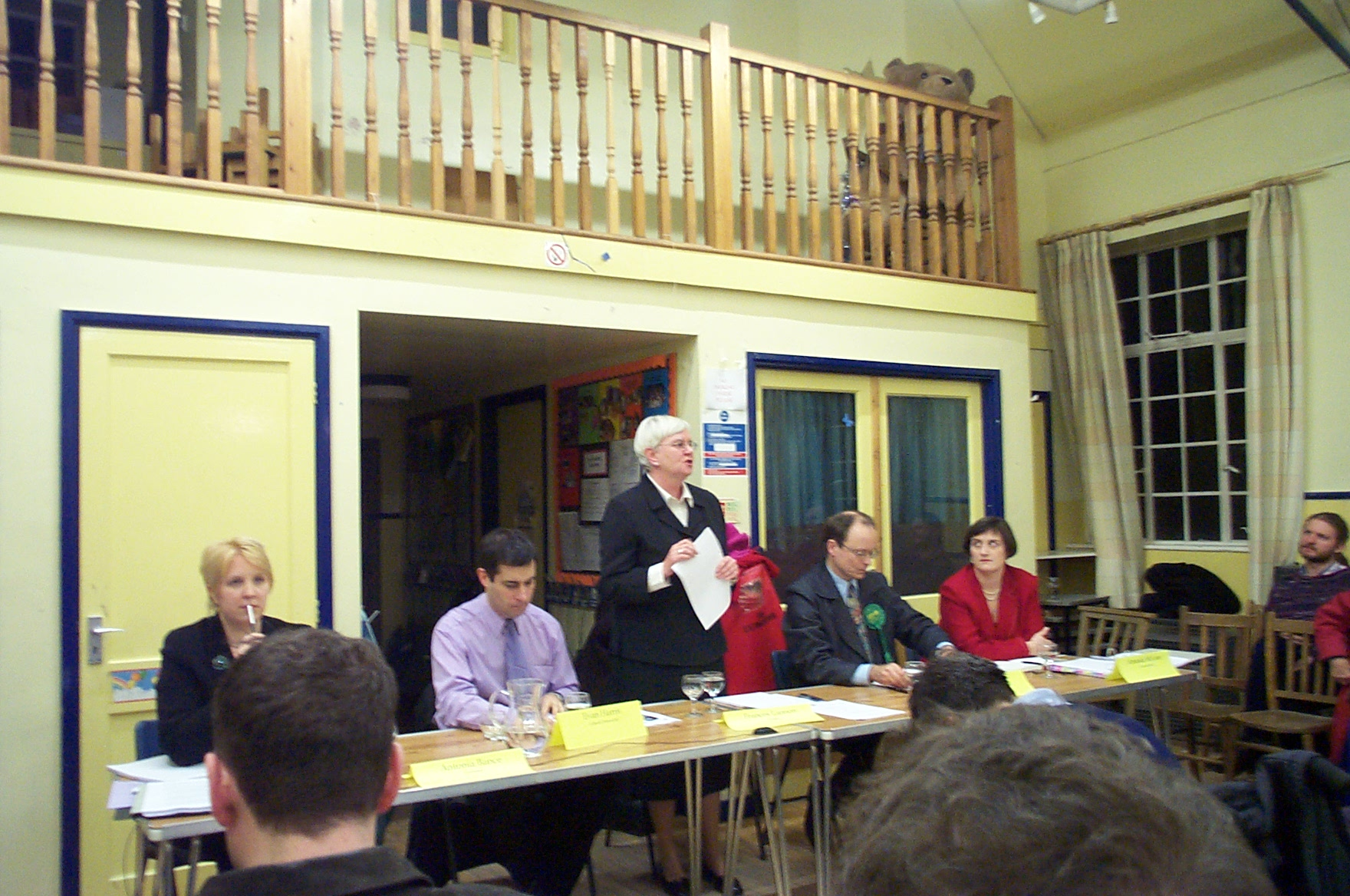
A pre-election husting at the Oxford West and Abingdon constituency during the 2005 campaign.

General election 2005: Oxford West and Abingdon
Party	Candidate	Votes	%	±%
Liberal Democrats	Evan Harris	24,336	46.3	−1.5
Conservative	Amanda McLean	16,653	31.7	+1.7
Labour	Antonia Bance	8,725	16.6	−1.1
Green	Tom Lines	2,091	4.0	+1.2
UKIP	Marcus Watney	795	1.5	+0.6
Majority		7,683	14.6	−3.2
Turnout		52,600	65.6	+1.1
Liberal Democrats hold		Swing	−1.6	

General election 2001: Oxford West and Abingdon
Party	Candidate	Votes	%	±%
Liberal Democrats	Evan Harris	24,670	47.8	+4.9
Conservative	Ed Matts	15,485	30.0	−2.7
Labour	Gillian Kirk	9,114	17.7	−2.5
Green	Mike Woodin	1,423	2.8	+1.7
UKIP	Marcus Watney	451	0.9	+0.5
Independent	Sigrid Shreeve	332	0.6	N/A
Extinction Club	Robert Twigger	93	0.2	N/A
Majority		9,185	17.8	+7.6
Turnout		51,568	64.5	−13.5
Liberal Democrats hold		Swing	+3.8	

=== Elections in the 1990s ===
General election 1997: Oxford West and Abingdon
Party	Candidate	Votes	%	±%
Liberal Democrats	Evan Harris	26,268	42.9	+7.1
Conservative	Laurence Harris	19,983	32.7	−13.6
Labour	Susan Brown	12,361	20.2	+4.1
Referendum	Gillian Eustace	1,258	2.1	N/A
Green	Mike Woodin	691	1.1	−0.1
UKIP	Rodney Buckton	258	0.4	N/A
ProLife Alliance	Linda Hodge	238	0.4	N/A
Natural Law	Anne Wilson	91	0.1	0.0
Local Government	John Rose	48	0.1	N/A
Majority		6,285	10.2	+3.8
Turnout		61,196	78.0	+1.3
Liberal Democrats gain from Conservative		Swing	+10.4	

General election 1992: Oxford West and Abingdon
Party	Candidate	Votes	%	±%
Conservative	John Patten	25,163	45.4	−1.0
Liberal Democrats	William Goodhart	21,624	39.0	+1.6
Labour	Bruce Kent	7,652	13.8	−1.1
Green	Mike Woodin	660	1.2	−0.1
Liberal	Roger Jenking	194	0.3	N/A
Anti-Federalist League	Susan Nelson	98	0.2	N/A
Natural Law	Geoffrey Wells	75	0.1	N/A
Majority		3,539	6.4	−2.6
Turnout		55,466	76.7	−1.7
Conservative hold		Swing	−1.3	

=== Elections in the 1980s ===
General election 1987: Oxford West and Abingdon
Party	Candidate	Votes	%	±%
Conservative	John Patten	25,171	46.4	−1.3
SDP	Chris Huhne	20,293	37.4	+4.1
Labour	John Power	8,108	14.9	−2.0
Green	Donald Smith	695	1.3	+0.2
Majority		4,878	9.0	−5.4
Turnout		54,267	78.4	+4.4
Conservative hold		Swing	−2.7	

General election 1983: Oxford West and Abingdon
Party	Candidate	Votes	%	±%
Conservative	John Patten	23,778	47.7	
SDP	Evan Luard	16,627	33.3	
Labour	Julian Jacottet	8,440	16.9	
Ecology	Suzette Starmer	544	1.1	
Monster Raving Loony	Robert Jones	267	0.5	
Independent	Christopher Smith	95	0.2	
Independent	Peter Doubleday	86	0.2	
Independent	Ruth Pinder	26	0.1	
Majority		7,151	14.4	
Turnout		49,863	74.0	
Conservative win (new seat)				

== See also ==
- List of parliamentary constituencies in Oxfordshire
- List of parliamentary constituencies in the South East England (region)
- Banbury
- Henley
- Oxford East
- Wantage
- Witney

== Sources ==
- Election result 2015
- Election result, 2015 (BBC)
- Election result, 2010 (BBC)
- Election result, 2005 (BBC)
- Election results, 1997–2001 (BBC)
- Election results, 1997–2001 (Election Demon)
- Election results, 1983–1997 (Election Demon)
