= Wasif Jawhariyyeh =

Palestinian writer and musician (1897–1973)

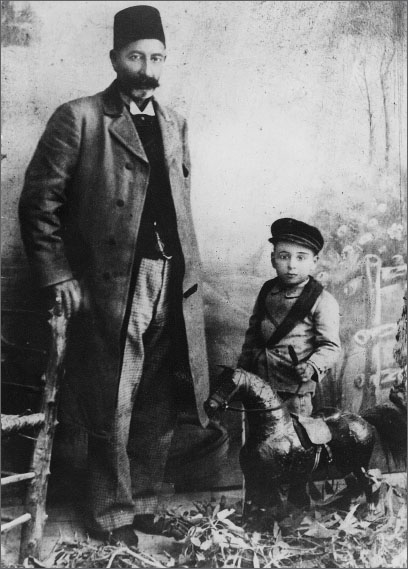
Wasif Jawhariyyeh and his father Jiryis Jawhariyyeh in a studio photograph circa 1900. The photograph was preserved in the Jawhariyyeh Collection and published by the Institute for Palestine Studies.

Wasif Jawhariyyeh (Arabic: واصف جوهرية; 14 January 1897 – 1972) was a Palestinian composer, oud player, poet and chronicler. He is known for his memoirs, The Diaries of Wasif Jawhariyyeh, that spans over six decades from 1904 to 1968, covering Jerusalem's turbulent modern history, including four regimes and five wars. British Member of Parliament Layla Moran is his great-granddaughter.

== Biography ==
=== Early life ===
Wasif Jawhariyyeh was born to Jiryis and Hilana Barakat on 14 January 1897 in Jerusalem. The Jawhariyyeh's practised Eastern Orthodox Christianity. His father was an active member of their community, as a member of Jerusalem's municipal council and served for a time as tax assessor. He would later pursue a career as a silk farmer, cafe proprietor, skilled icon maker. He also was an amateur musician.

His father, Jiryis (Girgis), was the mukhtar of the Eastern Orthodox community in the Old City (1884) and a member of Jerusalem's municipal council, serving under the Mayors Salim al-Husseini and Faidy al-Alami. Trained as a lawyer he was well versed in Muslim Shari' law and commanded several languages, including Greek, Turkish and Arabic. He worked briefly as a government tax assessor, but later turned to private business, becoming a successful silk farmer in Ezariyyeh and proprietor of a public café over the Jraisheh River. He was also a skilled icon maker and amateur musician—which accounts for his encouragement of Wasif to take on the 'oud early in his youth.

His mother, Hilaneh Barakat, descended from a leading Orthodox family from what later became known as the Christian Quarter.

—Salim Tamari, "Jerusalem's Ottoman Modernity: The Times and Lives of Wasif Jawhariyyeh"

The Jawhariyyeh's position within Jerusalem's class system, "It is impossible, however, to understand the Jawhariyyehs placement in pre-Mandate Palestine (British Mandate of Palestine) without relating to their critical bonds as protégés of the Husseini family in Jerusalem: feudal landlords and patricians of the city‘s inner circle of ‘ayan (notables). They were reliant on the Husseini family for appointments to positions on their lands and in civil service.

Wasif's childhood was greatly influenced by his father. His father oversaw Wasif's education, choosing schools and instructors for his children. At the age of nine Wasif developed an interest in music (particularly the 'uod ) the Jawhariyyeh's hosted a birthday celebration that featured a performance by Qustandi al-Sus. He would soon after take up 'oud lessons under the direction of Abdul Hamid Quttayna.

Around the same time, Wasif's father had him apprenticed to a local barbershop among other apprenticeships that, "supplemented his formal education and often furthered his evolving music career."

=== Education ===
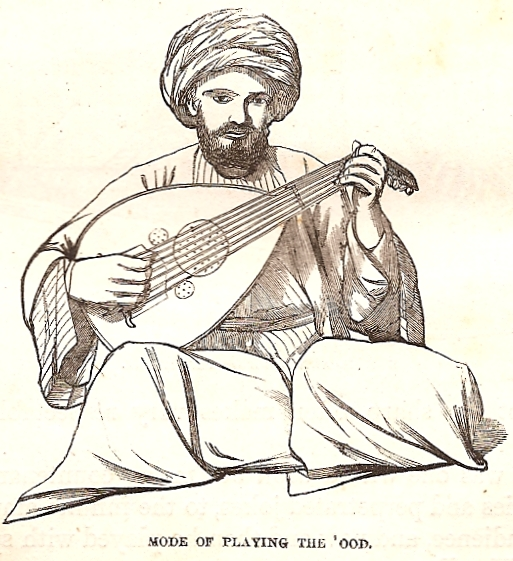
Palestinian oud performer in Jerusalem, 1859.

Wasif's education provides an example of the cultural diversity of Jerusalem. The writings of Wasif reflected, "...a substantial degree of formal schooling... His polished language, rich poetic imagination." Among the schools and subjects he studied were:

1. The Dabbagha School (governed by the Lutheran Church) until 1909 and his studies included: basic Arab grammar, dictation, reading and arithmetic.
2. The Dusturiya Nation School - a progressive institution directed by Khalil al-Sakakini. Here he was introduced to the subjects of physical education, English, French, Turkish. As well as Qu'ranic studies, which he later accredits to his, "...mastery of Arabic music and singing."
3. The al-Mutran School, where he was encouraged by his benefactor Husseini to study English.

Wasif's education important in the context of the degree of diversity within Jerusalem. He was a Christian who attended both Christian and Muslim institutions, where he studied the languages of both the Middle East and Europe, the texts of the Bible and the Quran.

The story of Jawharriyeh's education demonstrates the fluidity of boundaries in the Ottoman Empire during Jawhariyyeh's youth. In the contemporary world peoples' identities and social and political roles are relatively fixed. In the world of Jawhariyyeh's youth, boundaries separating the lives of Christians or Jews from Muslims were more fluid, as were urban social boundaries and the boundaries separating so-called traditional modern ways of life.

—Gelvin, The Modern Middle East: A History

=== Music career ===
Wasif's music career was influenced from the young age of nine. He was tutored by various musicians of Jerusalem. Wasif's music career exposed him to various cultures of the region and well as the West. Most important is the relationships formed with fellow musicians traveling from Lebanon, Egypt, Syria, Turkey and Russia. He played with and for Christians, Muslims and Jews. The collaboration of artists transcended the ethnic and sectarian identities.

Wasif's education and musical career were marked by the growing influence of the culture of al-nahda

== The Diaries of Wasif Jawhariyyeh ==
Cover of The Storyteller of Jerusalem, the English translation of The Diaries of Wasif Jawhariyyeh

The Diaries of Wasif Jawhariyyeh: (1904–1968), are the memoirs of Wasif Jawhariyyeh (1897–1972), a citizen of Jerusalem and a well known composer, Oud player, poet and chronicler. Jahwariyyeh's memoirs chronicle a period marked by extensive political and socio-economic transformation within the city of Jerusalem. The turn of the twentieth century ushered in an era of modernity within Jerusalem, manifested by advances in technology, industry, government, infrastructure, the arts, and education. Jawhariyyeh's writings serve as an invaluable primary source which have aided the study of the period; primarily on effects of modernization and the role of ethnicity and sectarian identities during the period.

=== Modernization in Jerusalem ===
The city of Jerusalem, at the start of Jawhariyyeh's writing in 1904, was described as, "a relative backwater of the Ottoman Empire. As such, the city was a rather late entrant into what might be called the 'great nineteenth-century transformation,' and Jawhariyyeh was a witness to that transformation." The modernization of Jerusalem resulted in the proliferation of new classes of society such as "absentee landowners" and "the establishment of municipal councils in cities around the Ottoman Empire, by the close of the nineteenth century."

=== Overview ===
The Diaries of Wasif Jawhariyyeh are the compilation of Jawhariyyeh's experiences that spans over six decades (1904–1968), "...of Jerusalem's turbulent modern history, covering four regimes and five wars." Jawharriyyeh survived extraordinary times, but is described as "not a particularly important individual," and did not rank among Jerusalem's "political or cultural elite." However, the importance of Jawharriyyeh's writings are attributed to the author's status as an ordinary member of society. The author's social status is reflected within the style of his writings, "The Memoirs are mostly written in the anecdotal style of the street hakawati (storyteller) that mesmerized Wasif's childhood." The text of The Diaries is laden with commentary and social critiques on Jerusalem's culture, politics and socio-economics. It embodies an unvarnished narrative of, "daily life at a critical juncture in Jerusalem's history."

=== Salim Tamari on the Importance of The Diaries of Wasif Jawhariyyeh ===
Societal interaction among the people of Jerusalem at the turn of the twentieth-century has been argued by many scholars as defined by,

The ethno-confessional division of four communities: Muslim, Christian, Armenian and Jewish. In these quarters, conventional accounts argue, social nodes were more or less exclusive, physically defined and reinforced by mechanisms of mutual aid, craft specialization, ritual celebrations, internal schooling systems and, above all, the rules of confessional endogamy.

—Salim Tamari, "Wasif Jawhariyyeh, Popular Music, and Early Modernity in Jerusalem"

However, the memoirs of emergence of Wasif Jawhariyyeh writings have provided scholars such as Salim Tamari with a primary source capable of refuting such a claim. Through the records of Jawhariyyeh, Tamari argues the "weaknesses in this paradigm," stated above and suggests,

Jerusalem's modernity was a feature of internal dynamics in the Ottoman City and propose that the social structure of the walled city was much more fluid than generally believed; further I suggest that the quarter system signalling the division of the Old City into confessional bounded domains was introduced and imposed retroactively on the city by British colonial regulations."

—Salim Tamari, "Wasif Jawhariyyeh, Popular Music and Modernity in Jerusalem".

Tamari refers to the city's culture scene as a "hybrid" of various ethnic and sectarian identities,

In the case of pre-war Ottoman Jerusalem... the city fostered a communitarian identity, a pre-nationalist confessional consciousness competing with emergency but vigorous Arab nationalism and localized (Syrian Palestinian) sentiments as well as an embryonic Jewish Zionist movement.

—Salim Tamari, "Wasif Jawhariyyeh, Popular Music and Modernity in Jerusalem".

Wasif's experience among various ethnic and sectarian groups was largely amicable. He studied Arabic and the Quran, played with Muslims, Turks, Europeans and referred to the Jews as, abna’ al-balad’ (sons of the country), ‘compatriots’, ‘Yahud awlad Arab,’(Jews, sons of Arabs)." Tamari's argument serves as a rejection of the constructivist narrative, and argues in favor of a structural model in understanding society in Jerusalem at the turn of the century. A period of modernization, imperial control under the British Mandate system account for the modern era confessional boundaries of Jerusalem.

== Works cited ==
- Gelvin, James L. (2008). The Modern Middle East: A History. New York: Oxford University Press.
- Tamari, Salim (Summer 2000). "Jerusalem's Ottoman Modernity: The Times and Lives of Wasif Jawhariyyeh" (PDF). Jerusalem Quarterly (9): 5–27. doi:10.70190/jq.I9.p5.
- Tamari, Salim (August 2004). "Ishaq al-Shami and the Predicament of the Arab Jew in Palestine" (PDF). Jerusalem Quarterly (21): 10–26. doi:10.70190/jq.I21.p10.
- Tamari, Salim (2006). "Wasif Jawhariyyeh, Popular Music and Modernity in Jerusalem". In Stein, Rebecca; Swedenberg, Ted (eds.). Palestine, Israel, and the Politics of Popular Culture. Durham: Duke University Press. OCLC 57002137.
- Tamārī, Salīm (2008), Mountain Against the Sea: Essays on Palestinian Society and Culture, University of California Press, ISBN 978-0-520-25129-8 "A Musician´s lot"; p.71 ff.
