= Louise Patten, Baroness Patten =

British businesswoman and author (born 1954)

The Right Honourable The Lady Patten
- Born: Louise Alexandra Virginia Charlotte Rowe; 2 February 1954 (age 72)
- Occupations: Businesswoman, author
- Spouse: John Patten, Baron Patten (m. 1978)
- Children: 1
- Relatives: Charles Lightoller (grandfather)

Louise Alexandra Virginia Charlotte Patten, Baroness Patten (née Rowe; 2 February 1954) is a British businesswoman and author, who is the wife of the Conservative politician John Patten and the granddaughter of the RMS Titanic Second Officer, Charles Lightoller.

== Background ==
Patten went to St Paul's Girls' School and then to Oxford University where she was a contemporary of Theresa May at St Hugh's College, Oxford. She married John Patten, later a Tory cabinet minister, in 1978 and has one daughter, Mary-Claire Patten.

== Business career ==
Patten is one of the few women who has held a senior position in British business. She states that "business is still organised for the majority, who are men" and this lifestyle is a major issue for women in business. During her career she has tended to choose companies that are family-friendly and has had a "portfolio career" - multiple part-time jobs at several companies.

She started work at Citibank in 1977. Four years later she moved to Wells Fargo Bank and then in 1985 became a partner in PA Consulting. In 1993 she left PA Consulting and became a non-executive director at the Hilton Group and at Harveys Furniture. She joined global strategy advisers Bain & Company Inc in 1993 where since 1997 she has been a Senior Adviser.

In 1998 she started as NED of Somerfield, a chain of small supermarkets. She rose to become chairman and stayed there until it was taken over by The Co-operative Group in March 2009.

In 2006 she started as a non-executive director of Marks & Spencer plc. She was later the chairman of Brixton plc, a FTSE 250 property business. In 2003 she was nicknamed "Queen of the Sheds" and described "the most powerful woman in property" due to this role.

She was a non-executive director of Bradford & Bingley when the company failed and was nationalised in 2008. She has remained on the board and is now an NED of UK Asset Resolution, which combines the run-down mortgages of the former Northern Rock and Bradford & Bingley.

== Novelist ==
She is the author of the novels Bad Money, a thriller based in the City of London, and Good as Gold, a historical novel about the Titanic disaster. In Good as Gold she claimed that the sinking had been caused by an error on the steering deck, due to confusion between competing systems of navigation orders. However, this claim, reportedly told her by her grandmother Sylvia Lightoller when Patten was ten, goes against multiple witness accounts at the U.S. and U.K. inquiries into the sinking and has been dismissed by Titanic historians due to lack of evidence and corroborating accounts.
