= Wickham Laboratories Ltd =

- Industry: Health care
- Founded: 1962; 64 years ago
- Founder: William B. Cartmell
- Headquarters: Gosport, Hampshire, England, United States
- Website: wickhamlabs.co.uk

Wickham Laboratories Ltd is a contract testing laboratory that supports the pharmaceutical and medical device industries. Located in Hampshire, England, it was founded in 1962 and remains an independent company.

== History ==
The company was founded by veterinarian, William B. Cartmell, who established a veterinary practice at Wickham, Fareham, Hampshire in 1954. As the business grew, he developed facilities and animal care techniques, including the construction of an animal hospital along with founding another six branches, then an animal hospital. A laboratory facility was developed in order to improve treatment to animals.

In 1962, Wickham Laboratories Ltd was incorporated as a separate company to provide contract testing services on behalf of pharmaceutical companies, doctors, farmers, and animal-feed manufacturers which included microbiology and chemistry testing. Mr Cartmell remains the company's Managing Director.

Wickham Laboratories Ltd relocated to its current site at Hoeford Point in Gosport, in 2012. Shortly after the move, in 2015, Wickham Laboratories Ltd appointed a new CEO, Dr John McKenzie, The company currently employs around 130 staff. The facility is subject to regular compliance auditing by relevant regulatory authorities including the Medicines and Healthcare products Regulatory Agency (MHRA) and the US Food and Drug Administration (FDA).

== Controversy ==
=== 2003 Animal Burglary ===
Keith Mann and one other activist from the Animal Liberation Front (ALF) broke into Wickham Laboratories on 13 December 2003, and stole 695 mice that were being used to test Dysport, made from botulinum toxin. This medicine is licensed in the UK to treat serious illnesses such as cerebral palsy. Symptoms of other illnesses the medicine treats include eye muscle contractions whereby a person cannot open their eyes, or suffering through chronic facial twitches and muscle spasms which can mean the inability to walk or move properly. Animals are used for research of this medicine where there is no alternative method. The drug is used in cosmetic surgery clinics to erase frown lines. It has been illegal to use animals to test for cosmetic purposes in the UK since 1998. Mann was arrested at his home and the mice were returned to the laboratory. He argued in court that the tests carried out by Wickham Laboratories were illegal because the product was being tested for cosmetic purposes, which is banned in Britain. The court rejected his defence, and found that the tests complied with British regulations because Dysport that was being tested is used for therapeutic purposes only.

Mann initially received a verdict of 230 hours of community service with no jail time, but as he left the dock, proceeded to make threatening comments to Wickham Laboratories Ltd’s technical director at the time, Chris Bishop, and was immediately thereafter found in contempt of court and sentenced to 6 months in jail. Melvyn Glintenkamp was given 170 hours of community service for aiding and abetting Mann by allowing him to keep the stolen mice in a caravan at his home.

=== 2009 BUAV investigation – 2010 Home Office Report ===
The Sunday Times published details in November 2009 of an eight-month undercover infiltration investigation conducted by the BUAV. Following a year-long investigation into the report, the Home Office published its own conclusions noting, “Licence and Certificate authorities to permit work under ASPA 1986 were, and are, in place at Wickham Laboratories... The authorities granted by the Home Office under ASPA were issued legitimately and with appropriate reference to current requirements for authorised medicinal products” The home office ministerial statement said: “the majority of concerns raised by the BUAV in their report have not been substantiated”.
