= Evan Harris =

British Liberal Democrat politician

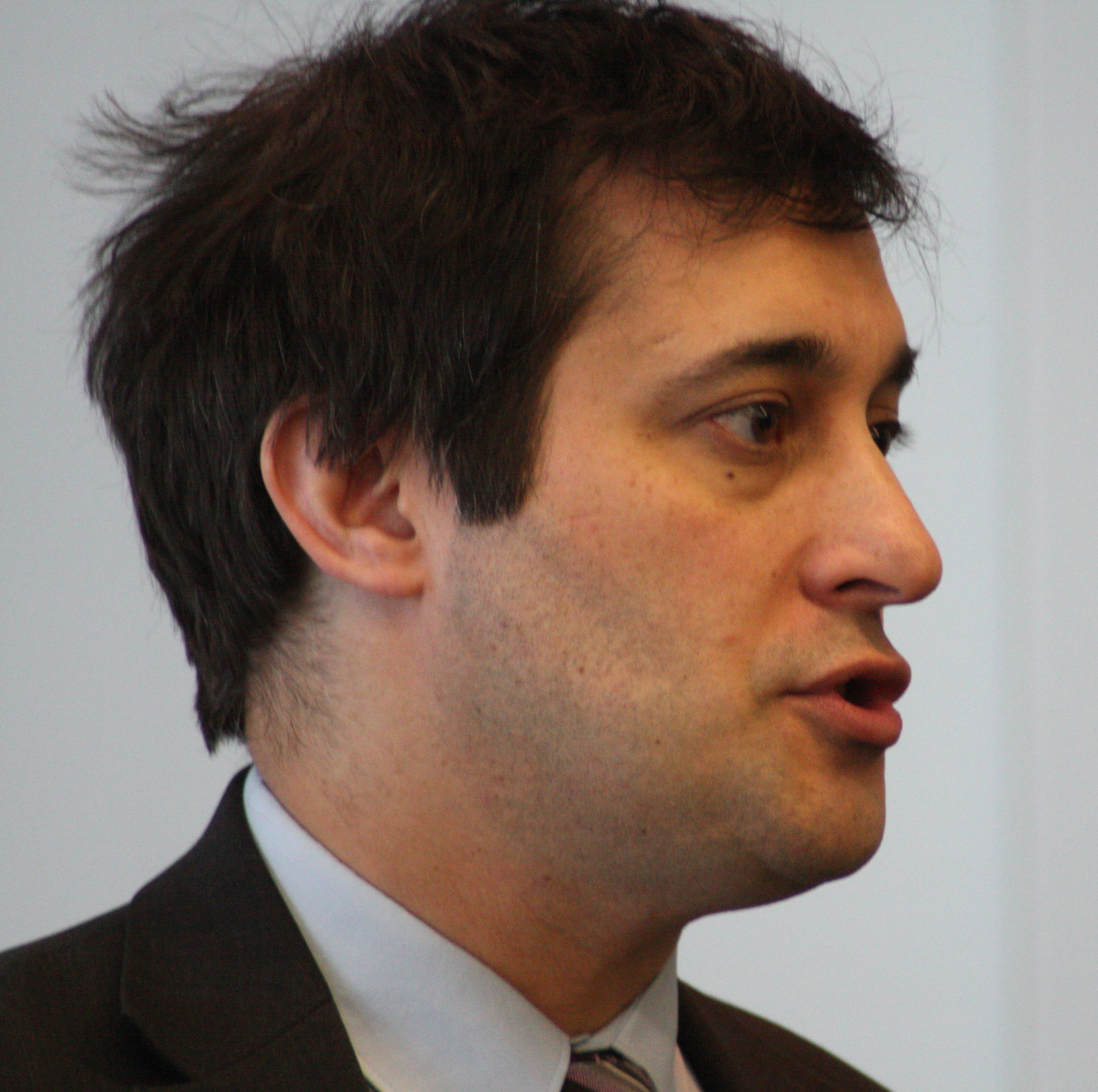
- Harris in 2010

Member of Parliament for Oxford West and Abingdon
- In office 2 May 1997 – 12 April 2010
- Preceded by: John Patten
- Succeeded by: Nicola Blackwood

Personal details
- Born: 21 October 1965 (age 60) Sheffield, West Riding of Yorkshire, England, United Kingdom
- Party: Liberal Democrat
- Education: Wadham College, Oxford

Evan Leslie Harris (born 21 October 1965) is a British Liberal Democrat politician. He was the Member of Parliament (MP) for Oxford West and Abingdon from 1997 to 2010, losing his seat in the 2010 general election by 176 votes to Conservative Nicola Blackwood.

Since 2011 he has been the joint executive director of Hacked Off, the campaign for an accountable press.

== Early life and career ==
Evan Harris was born on 21 October 1965 in Sheffield, West Riding of Yorkshire, the son of South African Jewish parents (his father was a medical professor). He was brought up in Liverpool, where he had a state education at the Liverpool Blue Coat School. In 1984 he won a scholarship to the independent Harvard-Westlake School in Los Angeles, California. Later, he went up to Wadham College, Oxford, on a scholarship. He took a BA in physiology and a diploma in medical sociology. He took a BM BCh from Oxford Medical School. In 1991, he qualified as a physician.

Harris began his career at the Royal Liverpool University Hospital in 1991 as a Pre-Registration House Officer (junior doctor). A year later, he moved to the John Radcliffe Hospital, Oxford, specialising in acute medicine and surgery. In 1994 Harris moved to Oxfordshire Health Authority, becoming an honorary specialist registrar in public health and working on issues to do with NHS staffing and training. Harris held the position of local British Medical Association representative and negotiator from 1992 to 1994, following which he was elected to the BMA's National Council.

Harris is a humanist, and a patron of Humanists UK. He was also a vice-chair of the All Party Parliamentary Humanist Group, before being unseated at the 2010 general election. In addition, he is an honorary associate of the National Secular Society, and the Patron of the Oxford Secular Society.

Harris lists his interests as football, bridge and chess.

== Political career ==
=== Election to Parliament ===
He was first elected to the House of Commons at the 1997 General Election for Oxford West and Abingdon. The seat had previously been held by Conservative John Patten, a former Cabinet minister. Harris gained the seat for the Liberal Democrats with a majority of 6,285, making his maiden speech on 21 May 1997, and remained the MP there until 2010.

=== Promotion to the frontbench ===
In parliament, he was made a frontbench spokesman on Health in 1997 by Paddy Ashdown. Following the election of Charles Kennedy as party leader in 1999, Harris became spokesman on Higher Education and Women's issues. He was promoted to the Liberal Democrat shadow cabinet following the 2001 general election as Shadow Secretary of State for Health, but stood down in 2003 to care for his girlfriend Liz O'Hara who had been diagnosed with terminal glioblastoma multiforme. Following the 2005 general election, Harris returned to the frontbench team as spokesman on Science, a position he held until his defeat in the 2010 general election.

Harris was a member of the education and employment select committee between 1999 and 2001. He was then a member of the select committees for science and technology between 2003 and 2010, and for human rights between 2005 and 2010.

Evan Harris is a member of the centre-left Beveridge Group within the Liberal Democrats, and was Honorary President of the Liberal Democrats Lesbian, Gay, Bisexual and Transgender equality organisation (LGBT+ Liberal Democrats) from 2000 to 2012.

In parliament, he served on many party groups, including the kidney group (as chairman); mental health; science; refugees; equality; and AIDS group.

=== Expenses ===
The Daily Telegraph alleged during the expenses scandal that Evans had profited from the sale of his second home . After Harris' response, the Telegraph withdrew its allegations. Sir Thomas Legg, the auditor brought in by the House of Commons, wrote to Harris to say that there were no problems with his expenses.

=== Campaigns ===
Harris is pro-choice on abortion, and supports the right of mentally competent, terminally ill people to take their own lives under certain circumstances. This has led to criticism from pro-life and Church leaders, such as George Pitcher.

Harris has also spoken in support of medical research involving animals, including that carried out at Oxford University. Notably, he joined Pro-Test's Oxford march in February 2008. This led animal rights activist Keith Mann to stand against Harris in the 2010 general election, during which he referred to Harris as "Dr Death".

Harris is a vocal backer of reform of defamation laws in the United Kingdom. He notably supported Simon Singh in his libel case against the British Chiropractic Association, saying "For every Simon Singh who wins there are hundreds of writers who never dare publish or who give up their legal battle because they cannot risk the cost of losing. That is why all the political parties must be held to their promises take action [to reform defamation law]". In 2009, Evan Harris was awarded (with Lord Avebury) the National Secular Society's Secularist of the Year Award in recognition of his role in the abolition of the common law offence of blasphemous libel.

=== Defeat in 2010 general election ===
In the 2010 general election, Harris was defeated by the Conservative candidate Nicola Blackwood. Harris received 23,730 votes to Blackwood's 23,906 – a margin of 176 votes. This equated to a 6.9% swing from the Liberal Democrats to the Conservatives. Several political commentators commented that this was one of the most surprising results of the general election – given Harris' high-profile position as a shadow minister and the size of his existing majority.

==== Pre-election campaign ====
For a number of years before the 2010 general election Harris' views on various social and theological matters had led to criticism within certain parts of the media. Christian conservatives criticised Harris, including Damian Thompson and Cristina Odone.

In the final weeks of the 2010 campaign, leaflets were distributed by Keith Mann, a candidate for the Animal Protection Party, attacking Harris as 'Dr Death', and criticising him for his support for animal testing, abortion, secularisation, and other issues. Further leaflets were distributed by the unaffiliated Reverend Lynda Rose, also referring to Harris as 'Dr Death', and criticising him for his secularism, support for abortion, embryo research and assisted suicide.

In contrast to these criticisms, Harris received support from a number of humanist and atheist figures, including Ben Goldacre, Simon Singh and Dave Gorman. Stephen Fry added his support, saying of Harris: "[Harris is] by far and away the most persuasive and impressive parliamentarian in the cause of good and open science and enquiry that we have had in the past decade. He has been central to mould-breaking and inspirational multiparty cooperation in issues of scientific concern since 1997."

==== Boundary changes ====
Before the 2010 general election, Harris's seat of Oxford West and Abingdon had its boundaries changed, moving the central Oxford wards of Carfax and Holywell, composed primarily of students of the University of Oxford, to the Oxford East constituency. In return the constituency gained a ward each from Wantage and Witney. These changes reduced Harris' notional majority from 7683 to 5525 votes, or 11.3%.

==== Reactions to election defeat ====
Responses to the election result varied. Harris' defeat was lamented by a number of commentators as a 'loss for science'. However, Harris' defeat was also celebrated by some conservative Christians, including Christian Concern For Our Nation, and George Pitcher who described it as "the best result of the election".

Richard Dawkins, posting on his site, wondered whether the religious criticisms of Harris had "caused Evan Harris to lose votes" or "gain them", noting that the answer to this would reflect the true extent of secular thought in Britain. Post-election analysis in the Oxford Mail suggested that Harris' strident secular opinions appeared to have "alienated a sufficiently large percentage of the electorate to lose what was considered a relatively safe seat for the Liberal Democrats". It detailed that while the Liberal Democrats had nationally gained a 1% swing in their favour, in the Oxford West constituency there had been a 6.9% swing away from the party to the Conservatives. Although 2001 census figures show that Oxford had the 10th highest proportion of people in England and Wales who listed themselves as having no religion, the census also showed that 76.1% of those surveyed did not class themselves as having no religion.

=== Career after 2010 general election defeat ===
From August 2010 Harris has been writing a blog on science policy for The Guardian. On 18 September 2010, Harris had an article published on The Guardian website called 'A secularist manifesto'. This was in turn critiqued by Jonathan Chaplin, who wrote that 'the manifesto contains troubling elements, which serve to undermine his professed support for the right to manifest religious belief.'

On 17 November 2010, Harris was elected as one of the three vice-chairs on the Liberal Democrats' Federal Policy Committee.

Parliament of the United Kingdom
Preceded by John Patten	Member of Parliament for Oxford West and Abingdon; 1997 – 2010	Succeeded by Nicola Blackwood
