= John Patten, Baron Patten =

British politician (born 1945)

The Right Honourable The Lord Patten PC

Secretary of State for Education
- In office 10 April 1992 – 20 July 1994
- Prime Minister: John Major
- Preceded by: Kenneth Clarke (Education and Science)
- Succeeded by: Gillian Shephard

Minister of State for Home Affairs
- In office 13 June 1987 – 10 April 1992
- Prime Minister: Margaret Thatcher; John Major
- Preceded by: David Mellor
- Succeeded by: Michael Jack

Minister of State for Housing
- In office 2 September 1985 – 13 June 1987
- Prime Minister: Margaret Thatcher
- Preceded by: Ian Gow
- Succeeded by: The Hon. William Waldegrave

Member of Parliament for Oxford West and Abingdon Oxford (1979–1983)
- In office 3 May 1979 – 8 April 1997
- Preceded by: Evan Luard
- Succeeded by: Evan Harris

Member of the House of Lords
- Lord Temporal
- Life peerage 17 June 1997

Personal details
- Born: 17 July 1945 (age 81)
- Party: Conservative
- Spouse: Louise Rowe (m. 1978)
- Children: 1
- Education: Sidney Sussex College, Cambridge

John Haggitt Charles Patten, Baron Patten, PC (born 17 July 1945) is a British politician. He was formerly Conservative Member of Parliament for Oxford and subsequently for Oxford West and Abingdon.

== Early life ==
A Roman Catholic, he was educated by the Jesuits at Wimbledon College before graduating from Sidney Sussex College, Cambridge. Patten then moved to the University of Oxford, working as a Geography Fellow, and taught political geography to former UK Prime Minister Theresa May while she was a student at St Hugh's College, Oxford.

== Parliamentary career ==
He was first elected for Oxford in 1979, transferring to Oxford West and Abingdon in 1983 after boundary changes divided the seat. He stood down at the 1997 general election. The seat was subsequently won by the Liberal Democrat Evan Harris.

Patten was offered the role of Secretary of State for Northern Ireland by Margaret Thatcher, but refused.

Patten served as Secretary of State for Education from 1992 to 1994. He was interviewed at some length by Brian Sherratt in 1994 regarding his role as Secretary of State. While he was Education Secretary, Patten described Birmingham education chief Tim Brighouse as "a madman ... wandering the streets, frightening the children." Brighouse sued, and won substantial damages which were donated to educational charities.

== House of Lords ==
Patten was created a life peer as Baron Patten of Wincanton in the County of Somerset on 17 June 1997. In 2013, Patten voted against the Marriage (Same Sex Couples) Act 2013.

Coat of arms of John Patten, Baron Patten
Crest Rising from a mount Vert a buzzard Sable grasping in the dexter claws a long cross Or. Escutcheon Vert a chief per fess Vert and vairy Argent and Sable. Supporters On either side a horse Sable langued Vert standing upon a compartment of grass Vert growing therefrom two Madonna lilies slipped and leaved Proper. Motto Curriculum Curre (Run The Race)

== Family ==
He is married to the businesswoman Louise Patten, whom he taught at St Hugh's College, Oxford, and they have one daughter, Mary-Claire, married to Daniel Lloyd Johnson of Essex.

== Other work ==
He was on the governing body of Abingdon School from 1983 to 1986. He has been a senior advisor to Charterhouse Capital Partners since 2001.

Parliament of the United Kingdom
Preceded by Evan Luard	Member of Parliament for Oxford; 1979–1983	Constituency abolished
New constituency	Member of Parliament for Oxford West and Abingdon; 1983–1997	Succeeded by Evan Harris
Political offices
Preceded by Kenneth Clarke as Secretary of State for Education and Science	Secretary of State for Education; 1992–1994	Succeeded by Gillian Shephard
Orders of precedence in the United Kingdom
Preceded by The Lord Baker of Dorking	Gentlemen; Baron Patten	Followed by The Lord Levene of Portsoken
