= Nicola Blackwood =

British politician (born 1979)

The Right Honourable The Baroness Blackwood of North Oxford
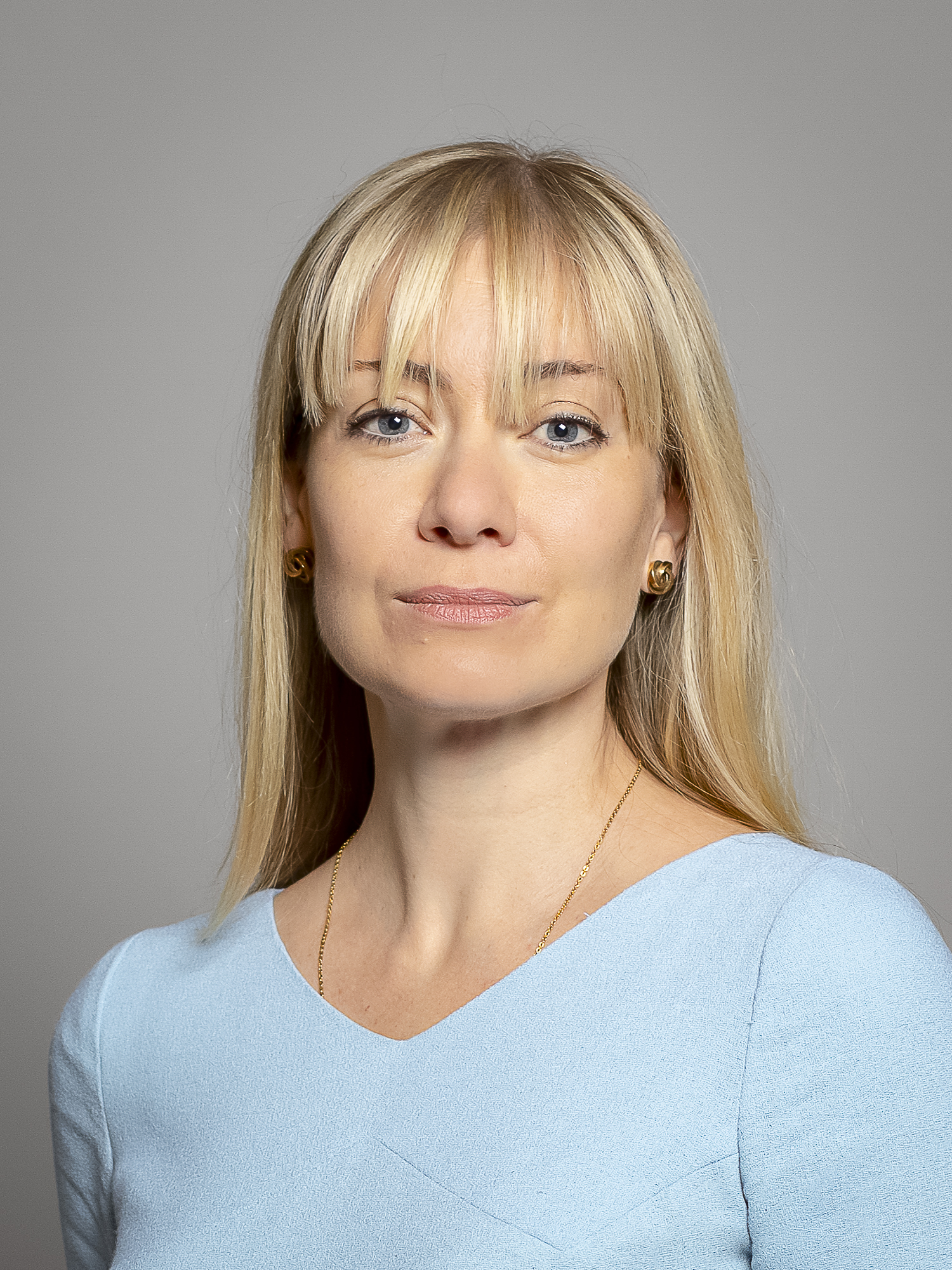
- Official portrait, 2020

Parliamentary Under-Secretary of State for Life Science
- In office 10 January 2019 – 13 February 2020
- Prime Minister: Theresa May; Boris Johnson
- Preceded by: The Lord O'Shaughnessy
- Succeeded by: The Lord Bethell

Parliamentary Under-Secretary of State for Public Health and Innovation
- In office 14 July 2016 – 9 June 2017
- Prime Minister: Theresa May
- Preceded by: Ben Gummer
- Succeeded by: Steve Brine

Chair of the Science and Technology Select Committee
- In office 18 June 2015 – 14 July 2016
- Preceded by: Andrew Miller
- Succeeded by: Stephen Metcalfe

Member of the House of Lords
- Lord Temporal
- Life peerage 1 February 2019

Member of Parliament for Oxford West and Abingdon
- In office 6 May 2010 – 3 May 2017
- Preceded by: Evan Harris
- Succeeded by: Layla Moran

Personal details
- Born: Nicola Claire Blackwood; 16 October 1979 (age 47) Johannesburg, South Africa
- Party: Conservative
- Spouse: Paul Bate (m. 2016)
- Education: St Anne's College, Oxford; Somerville College, Oxford; Emmanuel College, Cambridge

Nicola Claire Blackwood, Baroness Blackwood of North Oxford (born 16 October 1979) is a British politician of the Conservative Party. Baroness Blackwood was a Member of Parliament (MP) for Oxford West and Abingdon from 2010 to 2017. She has also been known by her married name Nicola Blackwood-Bate since 2016.

== Early life ==
Blackwood was born in Johannesburg, South Africa, but has lived in the UK since she was two months old. She is the daughter of a medical doctor and a nurse. Blackwood was given a flute aged six, which led to a lifelong interest in music, later learning to sing and play the piano. At 14 she enrolled at the Trinity School of Music. She studied music at St Anne's College, Oxford and Somerville College, Oxford, and later studied for an MPhil degree in musicology at Emmanuel College, Cambridge.

== Parliamentary career ==
Blackwood was chosen as the Conservative prospective parliamentary candidate for Oxford West and Abingdon at an open primary on 13 November 2006. Boundary changes which came into effect in 2010 were thought to have favoured the Conservatives, with some 8,000 urban voters (including many students) being moved into the Oxford East constituency and more rural voters added.

Blackwood won the seat at the 2010 general election by 176 votes on a 6.9% swing to the Conservatives from the Liberal Democrats. In late 2010, she was elected to serve on the Home Affairs Select Committee and was secretary of the All-Party Parliamentary Group on Overseas Development. She was a member of the Conservative Party Human Rights Commission, as well as holding a position on the Council of Advisors for ZANE, a charity which seeks to support pensioners in Zimbabwe.

She was elected Member of Parliament at the 2010 election with a majority of 176, defeating the Liberal Democrats, who had held the seat since 1997. She lost her seat to the Liberal Democrats at the 2017 election, who won it back with a majority of 816. During her time as Member of Parliament, she was chaired the Science and Technology Select Committee during the second Cameron ministry and served as a junior health minister during the first May ministry.

On 10 January 2019, Blackwood was appointed to replace Lord O'Shaughnessy as a junior minister for innovation in the Department of Health and Social Care serving in the House of Lords with the formal title of Parliamentary Under Secretary of State for Health and she would thus be created a life peer. Blackwood resigned from her ministerial position in the House of Lords in February 2020 to Prime Minister Boris Johnson to pursue time with her family.

Blackwood voted against the Marriage (Same Sex Couples) Bill in 2013 after indicating to many students and constituents that she would support the measure, for which she was criticised by the Oxford University Student Union. Blackwood said she had voted against the final draft of the Bill because she was not satisfied with the protection afforded religious freedoms.

At the 2015 general election, Blackwood retained her seat with a majority of 9,582, which was in part due to the national swing of voters against the Liberal Democrats.

In 2015, student activists criticised Blackwood for her support of fox hunting and she later confirmed pro-hunting group Vote-OK assisted with her election campaign during the 2015 general election. In June 2015, Blackwood was elected to the chairmanship of the Science & Technology Select Committee.

She was Parliamentary Under Secretary of State (PUS) at the Department of Health from July 2016–May 2017. In the 2017 general election, she lost her seat to the Liberal Democrat candidate Layla Moran who won with a majority of 816. She chaired the Human Tissue Authority between March 2018 and February 2019 when she was ennobled and rejoined the Government.

On 1 February 2019, she was created a life peer as Baroness Blackwood of North Oxford, of North Oxford in the County of Oxfordshire. She was briefly the youngest member of the House of Lords until Lord Ravensdale became a member of the House in March 2019.

Blackwood was appointed Chair of Genomics England in May 2020 which runs the 100,000 Genomes Project.

== Personal life ==
Blackwood has been a member of the Conservative Christian Fellowship since 2005, and is a regular worshipper at the Church of England's St Aldate's in Oxford.

In March 2015, Blackwood said that she had been diagnosed with the genetic condition Ehlers–Danlos syndrome in 2013 and had later been diagnosed with the associated secondary condition of postural orthostatic tachycardia syndrome (POTS), which causes chronic migraines for which she is treated by having 32 injections in the head every 10–12 weeks. She also stated that her medical conditions had not affected her performance as a Member of Parliament. Her POTS was thought to be the cause of her fainting in the House of Lords whilst giving a statement at the despatch box on 17 June 2019, although she later said it was "no big deal".

Blackwood married Paul Bate, founder, chief executive officer and portfolio manager at Matterhorn Investment Management LLP, in September 2016 at Merton College, Oxford. Bate is a member of Oxford's Vincent's Club.

Parliament of the United Kingdom
Preceded by Evan Harris	Member of Parliament for Oxford West and Abingdon; 2010–2017	Succeeded by Layla Moran
Orders of precedence in the United Kingdom
Preceded by The Baroness Osamor	Ladies; Baroness Blackwood of North Oxford	Followed by The Baroness Bennett of Manor Castle
