= Warden of Savernake Forest =

Warden of Savernake Forest is a hereditary title of the United Kingdom, relating to the ownership and management of Savernake Forest, near Marlborough in Wiltshire. Since the creation of the marquessate in 1821, the title has been held by the Marquesses of Ailesbury, the Brudenell-Bruce family. The title has, unusually, passed by descent since first recorded in the 11th century. The current warden, David Brudenell-Bruce, 9th Marquess of Ailesbury, is the 31st warden such listed.

The main reference material on this topic was published in 1949 by the 29th warden, Cedric Brudenell-Bruce, 7th Marquess of Ailesbury, in his book The Wardens of Savernake Forest, a collection of material he had previously published in the Wiltshire Archaeological Magazine between 1946 and 1949 based on research in his family archive, much of which is now held by the Wiltshire and Swindon History Centre.

== History ==
The earliest reference to the forest is found in a 934 charter of King Æthelstan, as "the woodland which is called Safernoc". A forest landholder is first recorded in the Exeter Book in 1083 and the Domesday Book in 1086, in which one Richard Estormit or Estormid is recorded as owning property at and around Burbage. Domesday also records that Estormit's land during the reign of Edward the Confessor had been held by a Saxon named Aluric. Following the 1066 Norman Conquest, land was near-universally taken from previous Saxon owners and given to Normans loyal to William the Conqueror; it is assumed that Estormit arrived with or following William, and was given these lands post-conquest. His surname is taken as a Norman-French word, perhaps meaning "wary". In the 12th century, two Henrys were recorded as paying rent for "Marlborough Forest", Henry Esturmit in 1129 and Henry Esturmi between 1156 and 1162. In the absence of further references, it is assumed that these were two separate people, Richard's son and grandson respectively. Geoffrey Esturmy, taken as the second Henry's son, is the next in the record, with references spanning 1162-1200. Geoffrey was briefly dispossessed of the forest in the 1190s due to his part in the future King John's revolt against Richard I, with control passing to Walter Esturmy for this period, who it is again assumed was a relation.

A succession of Esturmys followed as wardens through the mediaeval period; their fortunes fluctuated, but they continued to hold the forest. With the death of 11th warden William Esturmy in 1427, the title passed via his daughter Matilda to her son John Seymour. The Seymour family grew greatly in national prominence over the succeeding century, with 15th warden Edward Seymour, 1st Duke of Somerset (c.1500-1552) serving as Lord Protector from 1547 to 1549 during the minority of his nephew, King Edward VI, son of his sister Jane, King Henry VIII's third wife. Edward Seymour's protectorate lost support and he was removed from power and ultimately executed for treason. His lasting legacy for the wardenship was to obtain legal ownership of the forest. Seymours continued as wardens into the late 17th century, now able to claim royal descent thanks to the marriage of 16th warden Edward Seymour, 1st Earl of Hertford (1539-1621) to King Henry VII's great-granddaughter Katherine Grey.

The death of 19th warden John Seymour, 4th Duke of Somerset in 1675 without male heir prompted an interregnum. On the 1676 marriage of his niece and heir Elizabeth Seymour (c.1655-1697) to Thomas Bruce, 2nd Earl of Ailesbury, Bruce became the 20th warden. A staunch friend of successive Stuart monarchs, Thomas Bruce remained a supporter of King James II of England after the latter fled the country in 1688, and in 1695 was accused of conspiracy to restore the Jacobite line. This resulted in his exile, and he lived in Brussels from 1698 until the end of his long life. In 1703, Bruce's son and heir Charles Bruce, 3rd Earl of Ailesbury (1682-1747) came of age; he immediately wrote to his exiled father, proposing that full control over the forest should be granted to him, a proposal that Thomas assented to readily. Thus, although Charles did not inherit the wardenship until 1741, he effectively acted as warden from 1703.

After Charles's death in 1747, only agnatic lines remained, and the wardenship passed to the son of Bruce's sister Elizabeth, Thomas Brudenell-Bruce, 1st Earl of Ailesbury (1729-1814), who added the Bruce name to his birth surname of Brudenell. Thomas Brudenell-Bruce's son, 23rd warden Charles Brudenell-Bruce (1773-1856) lobbied repeatedly for his title to be improved. He achieved his ambition in 1821, when following the coronation of George IV, the Ailesbury title became a marquessate, in reward for long years of political loyalty. This was a time of great prosperity for the Brudenell-Bruce family, with the estate's mansion, Tottenham House being rebuilt in the 1820s to its current size. However, the 26th warden, William Brudenell-Bruce, 4th Marquess of Ailesbury (1863-1894) ran up heavy gambling debts, and sought to sell the estate to pay them off. After a lengthy legal battle, headed by his uncle and later successor Henry Brudenell-Bruce, 5th Marquess of Ailesbury, this was prevented, and the Brudenell-Bruces continue to hold the forest and the title, although not Tottenham House, which was sold in 2014. 31st and current warden David Brudenell-Bruce (b.1952) has been warden since 1987; his father Michael Brudenell-Bruce, 8th Marquess of Ailesbury (1926-2024) chose to pass the title of warden to him while still living.

== Savernake Horn ==
The ancient decorated hunting horn known as the Savernake Horn was held at Savernake by the wardens from at latest the 16th century. The office gradually lost responsibilities over time, and by the time of the writing of The Wardens of Savernake Forest in 1949, the sole remaining responsibility of the warden was to blow the horn on the arrival of the monarch at the forest. This was last done in 1940, on the visit of George VI to 28th warden Chandos Brudenell-Bruce, 6th Marquess of Ailesbury. In 1975, the horn was sold by 30th warden Michael Brudenell-Bruce, being subsequently bought by the British Museum, its current owner.

== List of Wardens ==
=== Saxon ===
No.	Warden (birth–death)	Wardenship	Relation to predecessor	Monarch
0	Aluric	before 1066	Unknown	Edward the Confessor

=== Esturmy Wardens ===
No.	Warden (birth–death)	Wardenship	Relation to predecessor	Monarch
1	Richard Estormit (fl.1083-1086)	before 1083 - after 1086	None?	William I
2	Henry Esturmit (fl.1129)	before 1129 - after 1129	Son?	Henry I
3	Henry Esturmi (fl.1156-1162)	before 1156 - c.1170	Son?	Henry II
4	Geoffrey Esturmy (fl.1162-1200)	c.1170-1200	Son?	Henry II Richard I John
5	Henry Esturmy (fl.1200-1214)	1200 - after 1214	Son	John
6	Geoffrey Esturmy (c.1205-1245)	1226-1245	Son	Henry III
7	Henry Esturmy (c.1233-1295)	1254-1295	Son	Henry III Edward I
8	Henry Esturmy (c.1255-1305)	1295-1305	Son	Edward I
9	Henry Esturmy (1282-1338)	1305-1338	Son	Edward I Edward II; Edward III
10	Henry Esturmy (c.1313-1382)	1338-1382	Son	Edward III Richard II
11	William Esturmy (c.1356-1427)	1382-1427	Son	Richard II Henry IV; Henry V Henry VI

=== Seymour Wardens ===
No.	Warden (birth–death)	Wardenship	Relation to predecessor	Monarch
12	John Seymour (1402-1464)	1427-1464	Grandson	Henry VI Edward IV
13	John Seymour (c.1450-1491)	1464-1491	Grandson	Edward IV Henry VI; Edward IV; Edward V Richard III; Henry VII
14	John Seymour (c.1474-1536)	1491-1536	Son	Henry VII Henry VIII
15	Edward Seymour, 1st Duke of Somerset (c.1500-1552)	1536-1552	Son	Henry VIII Edward VI
16	Edward Seymour, 1st Earl of Hertford (1539-1621)	1552-1621	Son	Edward VI Mary I Elizabeth I James I
17	William Seymour, 2nd Duke of Somerset (1588-1660)	1621-1660	Grandson	James I Charles I Interregnum; Charles II
18	William Seymour, 3rd Duke of Somerset (1652-1671)	1660-1671	Grandson	Charles II
19	John Seymour, 4th Duke of Somerset (before 1646 - 1675)	1671-1675	Uncle	Charles II

Interregnum 1675–1676

=== Bruce Wardens ===
No.	Warden (birth–death)	Wardenship	Relation to predecessor	Monarch
20	Thomas Bruce, 2nd Earl of Ailesbury (1656-1741)	1676-1741 Passed control but not title to his son in 1703	Nephew-in-law Not a blood relation	Charles II James II; William III and Mary II; Anne; George I George II
21	Charles Bruce, 3rd Earl of Ailesbury (1682-1747)	1741-1747 Acted as effective warden from 1703	Son Line of descent restored	George II

=== Brudenell-Bruce Wardens ===
No.	Warden (birth–death)	Wardenship	Relation to predecessor	Monarch
22	Thomas Brudenell-Bruce, 1st Earl of Ailesbury (1729-1814)	1747-1814	Nephew	George II George III
23	Charles Brudenell-Bruce, 1st Marquess of Ailesbury (1773-1856)	1814-1856	Son	George III George IV; WilliamIV; Victoria
24	George Brudenell-Bruce, 2nd Marquess of Ailesbury (1804-1878)	1856-1878	Son	Victoria
25	Ernest Brudenell-Bruce, 3rd Marquess of Ailesbury (1811-1886)	1878-1886	Brother	Victoria
26	William Brudenell-Bruce, 4th Marquess of Ailesbury (1863-1894)	1886-1894	Grandson	Victoria
27	Henry Brudenell-Bruce, 5th Marquess of Ailesbury (1842-1911)	1894-1911	Uncle	Victoria Edward VII; George V
28	Chandos Brudenell-Bruce, 6th Marquess of Ailesbury (1873-1961)	1911-1961	Son	George V Edward VIII; George VI; Elizabeth II
29	Cedric Brudenell-Bruce, 7th Marquess of Ailesbury (1904-1974)	1961-1974	Son	Elizabeth II
30	Michael Brudenell-Bruce, 8th Marquess of Ailesbury (1926-2024)	1974-1987	Son	Elizabeth II
31	David Brudenell-Bruce, 9th Marquess of Ailesbury (b.1952)	1987-	Son	Elizabeth II Charles III
