= Clan Bruce =

Scottish family from Kincardine in Scotland; Royal House

- Clann Brùs
- Crest: A lion stantan Azure armed and langued Gules
- Motto: Fuimus (We have been)

Profile
- Region: Lowlands
- District: Fife

Chief
- The Rt Hon. Andrew Douglas Bruce
- The 11th Earl of Elgin
- Seat: Broomhall House
- Historic seat: Lochmaben Castle; Clackmannan Tower
Septs of Clan Bruce
Airth, Brews, Brix, Bruwes, Bruss, Bruc, Bruys, Brues, Brice, Bryce, Bruce, Bruice, Bruis, Bruze, Broce, Brois, Broiss, Brose, Broise, Brouss, Brus, Bruse, Brush, Carlyle, Carlysle, Cowden, Crosbie, Crosby, de Bruce, de Brus, de Brix, Leggat, Randolph, Stenhouse
Clan branches
Bruce of Elgin (chiefs)
Bruce of Annandale (historic chiefs)
Bruce of Kincardine See also:Bruce baronets
Counts Bruce of the Russian Empire
Allied clans
Clan Campbell
Clan Carruthers
Clan Mar
Clan Irvine
Clan Kennedy
Clan Erskine
Clan Wallace
Clan Kirkpatrick
Rival clans
Clan Comyn
Clan MacDougall
Clan Lamont

Clan Bruce (Scottish Gaelic: Brùs) is a Lowlands Scottish clan. It was a royal house in the 14th century, producing two kings of Scotland (Robert the Bruce and David II), and a disputed High King of Ireland, Edward Bruce.

== Origins ==
The surname Bruce comes from the French de Brus or de Bruis, derived from the lands now called Brix, Normandy, France. There is no evidence to support a claim that a member of the family, 'Robert de Brix', served under William the Conqueror during the Norman Conquest of England. This notion is now believed to have originated in unreliable lists, derived from the later Middle Ages, of people who supposedly fought at the Battle of Hastings.

Both the English and Scots lines of the Brus/Bruce family demonstrably descend from Robert de Brus, 1st Lord of Annandale who came to England in 1106. Robert de Brus was a companion-in-arms of Prince David, later King David I. In 1124 he followed David north to reclaim his kingdom. When a civil war broke out in England between Empress Matilda and her cousin, Stephen, David I of Scotland led a force into England. However de Brus did not follow David and instead joined the English and at the Battle of the Standard in 1138 he took prisoner his own son, who was now Lord of the lands of Annandale. Robert de Brus, 1st Lord of Annandale died on 11 May 1141 and was buried at Gysburn.

== Foundation of the royal line ==
The foundation for the Bruce royal claim came in 1219 when Robert Bruce, 4th Lord of Annandale married Isobel of Huntingdon, daughter of David of Scotland, 8th Earl of Huntingdon and niece of William the Lion. The union brought both great wealth, with the addition of lands in both England and Scotland. Their son, Robert Bruce, 5th Lord of Annandale, known as "The Competitor" was sometime Tanist (a particularly Gaelic type of heir) to the throne. On the death of Alexander III both Bruce and John Balliol claimed succession. Margaret, Alexander's infant granddaughter was named as heir, however, she died in 1290 travelling to Scotland to claim her throne. Soon after the death of young queen Margaret, fearing civil war between the Bruce and Balliol families and their supporters, the Guardians of Scotland asked the kingdom's southern neighbour, Edward I of England to arbitrate among the claimants in order to avoid civil war. Edward I saw this as the opportunity he had long been waiting for to conquer Scotland as he had conquered Wales and rule over all the British Isles. In 1292 Edward chose Balliol who swore allegiance to the English monarch. It was not long, however, before Balliol rebelled against Edward, eventually leading to John's defeat and forced abdication after the Battle of Dunbar in 1296.

== Ascent to the throne ==
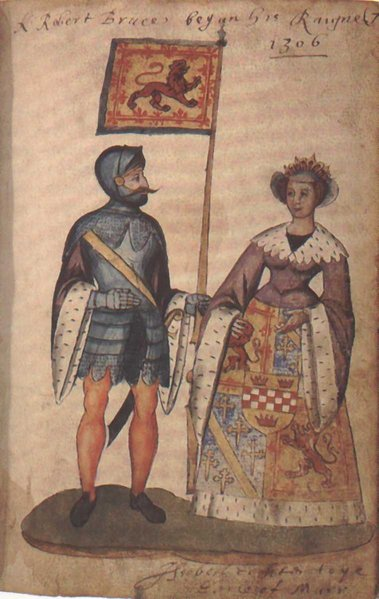
Robert the Bruce and Isabella of Mar

With the abdication of John Balliol, Scotland was effectively without a monarch. Robert the Bruce swore allegiance to Edward at Berwick-upon-Tweed but breached this oath when he joined the Scottish revolt the following year. In the summer of 1297 he again swore allegiance to Edward in what is known as the Capitulation of Irvine. Bruce appears to have sided with the Scots during the Battle of Stirling Bridge but when Edward returned victorious to England after the Battle of Falkirk, Bruce's lands of Annandale and Carrick were exempted from the lordships and lands which Edward assigned to his followers. Bruce, it seems, was seen as a man whose allegiance might still be won.

Bruce and John Comyn (a rival for the throne) succeeded William Wallace as Guardians of Scotland, but their rivalry threatened the stability of the country. A meeting was arranged at Greyfriars Church, Dumfries which was neutral ground, but Bruce stabbed Comyn through the heart, and as a result was excommunicated by Pope Clement V. Nevertheless, Robert the Bruce was crowned King of Scotland at Scone, Perthshire in 1306. However, soon after he was forced by the English to retreat into Argyll, in an attempt to reach his Clan Campbell allies. The Clan MacDougall, whose chief was the uncle or cousin of John Comyn who Bruce had murdered, surprised the Bruce and defeated him in what was known as the Battle of Dalrigh. The king escaped but left behind what was described as a magnificent example of Celtic jewellery, known as the Brooch of Lorne and it became one of the Clan MacDougall's great treasures. Three years later Robert the Bruce led three thousand battle hardened veterans into Argyll against the MacDougalls. John MacDougall of Lorne set an ambush for them but in the ensuing Battle of the Pass of Brander the MacDougalls were defeated and forced to flee. The MacDougalls' lands were then forfeited by the king and he gave them to the Campbells for their loyalty. Robert the Bruce led the Scottish army at the Battle of Bannockburn in 1314 where the English were defeated.

In 1334 Thomas Bruce, who claimed kinship with the royal house of Bruce, organized a rising in the Kyle, along with Robert Stewart (later King Robert II) against the English.

== After Robert the Bruce ==
Robert the Bruce's son, David II became king on his father's death in 1329. In 1346 under the terms of the Auld Alliance David marched south into England in the interests of France, but was defeated at the Battle of Neville's Cross and imprisoned on 17 October of that year, and remained in England for eleven years. David returned to Scotland after negotiation of a treaty and ruled there until he died in Edinburgh Castle unexpectedly in 1371 without issue. The line of succession passed to the House of Stewart.

Sir Edward Bruce was made commendator of Kinloss Abbey, which included the Barony of Muirton, and was appointed a judge in 1597. He was appointed a Lord of Parliament with the title of Lord Kinloss in 1601. Edward Bruce accompanied James VI to claim his English throne in 1603. As a result, he was subsequently appointed to English judicial office as Master of the Rolls. He was granted the Barony of Kinloss as Lord Bruce of Kinloss in 1608. In 1633 his son, Thomas, was created first Earl of Elgin. When the fourth Earl died without issue, the title passed to the descendants of Sir George Bruce of Carnock, who already held the title Earl of Kincardine and in 1747 the Earldoms were united.

Thomas Bruce, 7th Earl of Elgin was a diplomat and ambassador to the Ottoman Empire between 1799 and 1803. He spent much of his fortune collecting marble sculptures from the Parthenon in Athens, after receiving a permission from the Ottoman Empire. They are now commonly referred to as the Elgin Marbles. His son, James, was Governor General of the Province of Canada and Viceroy of India.

Brudenell and Bruce family tree including: Earls and Marquesses of Ailesbury, Earls of Cardigan, Earls of Elgin, and Earls of Kincardine family tree

Edward Bruce of Blairhall c. 1505–1565
Lord Kinloss, 1602 Lord Bruce of Kinloss, 1604; Lord Bruce of Kinloss, 1608
Edward Bruce; 1548–1611; 1st Lord Kinloss, etc.	George Bruce of Carnock c. 1550–1625	Margaret Primrose
Earl of Elgin and Baron Bruce of Whorlton in the County of York, 1633
Edward Bruce; 1594–1613; 2nd Lord Kinloss, etc.	Thomas Bruce; 1599–1663; 1st Earl of Elgin, etc., 3rd Lord Kinloss, etc.	Mary Preston	George Bruce (2nd) of Carnock d. 1643	Robert Bruce of Broomhall d. 1652
Earl of Ailesbury (1st creation), Viscount Bruce, and Baron Bruce of Skelton, 1664	Baron Brudenell of Stonton in the County of Leicester, 1628 Earl of Cardigan, 1661	Earl of Kincardine and Lord Bruce of Torry, 1647	See also: Dukes of Montrose family tree for the a different creation of the Earl of Kincardine 1644
Robert Bruce; 1627–1685; 2nd Earl of Elgin, etc., 1st Earl of Ailesbury, etc., 4th Lord Kinloss, etc.	Thomas Brudenell c. 1583–1663; 1st Earl of Cardigan, etc.	Edward Bruce d. 1662; 1st Earl of Kincardine, etc.	Alexander Bruce c. 1629–1680; 2nd Earl of Kincardine, etc.	Alexander Bruce d. 1706; 4th Earl of Kincardine, etc.
Thomas Bruce; 1656–1741; 3rd Earl of Elgin, etc., 2nd Earl of Ailesbury, etc., 5th Lord Kinloss, etc.	Robert Brudenell; 1607–1703; 2nd Earl of Cardigan, etc.	Alexander Bruce c. 1666–1705; 3rd Earl of Kincardine, etc.	Robert Bruce d. 1718; 5th Earl of Kincardine, etc.	Alexander Bruce; 1662–1721; 6th Earl of Kincardine, etc.	Thomas Bruce; 1663–1739/1740; 7th Earl of Kincardine, etc.
Baron Bruce of Tottenham in the County of Wilts, 1746
Charles Bruce; 1682–1747; 4th Earl of Elgin, etc., 3rd Earl of Ailesbury, etc., 6th Lord Kinloss, etc., 1st Baron Bruce of Tottenham	George Brudenell; 1685–1732; 3rd Earl of Cardigan, etc.	Elizabeth Brudenell; 1689–1745	William Bruce; 1710–1740; 8th Earl of Kincardine, etc.
Earldom of Ailesbury, Viscountcy of Bruce, Whorlton Barony Bruce, Barony of Bruce of Skelton, and Lordship of Kinloss extinct, 1747
Earl of Ailesbury Buckinghamshire, Great Britain (2nd creation), 1747
George Brudenell, later Montagu; 1712–1790; Duke of Montagu, Marquess of Monthermer, 4th Earl of Cardigan, etc.	James Brudenell; 1725–1811; 5th Earl of Cardigan, etc.	Robert Brudenell; 1726–1768	Thomas Brudenell-Bruce; 1729–1814; 1st Earl of Ailesbury, 2nd Baron Bruce of Tottenham	Charles Bruce; 1732–1771; 5th Earl of Elgin, etc., 9th Earl of Kincardine, etc.
Marquess of Ailesbury, Earl Bruce of Whorlton, County of York, and Viscount Savernake of Savernake Forest, Wiltshire, 1821
Robert Brudenell; 1760–1837; 6th Earl of Cardigan, etc.	Charles Brudenell-Bruce; 1773–1856; 1st Marquess of Ailesbury, etc., 2nd Earl of Ailesbury, 3rd Baron Bruce of Tottenham	William Robert Bruce; 1764–1771; 6th Earl of Elgin, etc., 10th Earl of Kincardine, etc.	Thomas Bruce; 1766–1841; 7th Earl of Elgin, etc., 11th Earl of Kincardine, etc.
Baron Elgin of Elgin, 1849
James Brudenell🐴 1797–1868; 7th Earl of Cardigan, etc.	George Brudenell-Bruce; 1804–1878; 2nd Marquess of Ailesbury, etc., 8th Earl of Cardigan, etc., 3rd Earl of Ailesbury, 4th Baron Bruce of Tottenham	Ernest Brudenell-Bruce; 1811–1886; 3rd Marquess of Ailesbury, etc., 9th Earl of Cardigan, etc., 4th Earl of Ailesbury, 5th Baron Bruce of Tottenham	James Bruce; 1811–1863; 8th Earl of Elgin, etc., 12th Earl of Kincardine, etc., 1st Baron Elgin
George John Brudenell-Bruce; 1839–1868	Henry Brudenell-Bruce; 1842–1911; 5th Marquess of Ailesbury, etc., 11th Earl of Cardigan, etc., 6th Earl of Ailesbury, 7th Baron Bruce of Tottenham	Victor Alexander Bruce; 1849–1917; 9th Earl of Elgin, etc., 13th Earl of Kincardine, etc., 2nd Baron Elgin
George William Thomas Brudenell-Bruce; 1863–1894; 4th Marquess of Ailesbury, etc., 10th Earl of Cardigan, etc., 5th Earl of Ailesbury, 6th Baron Bruce of Tottenham	George William James Chandos Brudenell-Bruce; 1873–1961; 6th Marquess of Ailesbury, etc., 12th Earl of Cardigan, etc., 7th Earl of Ailesbury, 8th Baron Bruce of Tottenham	Edward James Bruce; 1881–1968; 10th Earl of Elgin, etc., 14th Earl of Kincardine, etc., 3rd Baron Elgin
Chandos Sydney Cedric Brudenell-Bruce; 1904–1974; 7th Marquess of Ailesbury, etc., 13th Earl of Cardigan, etc., 8th Earl of Ailesbury, 9th Baron Bruce of Tottenham
Michael Sydney Cedric Brudenell-Bruce; 1926–2024; 8th Marquess of Ailesbury, etc., 14th Earl of Cardigan, etc., 9th Earl of Ailesbury, 10th Baron Bruce of Tottenham	Andrew Douglas Alexander Thomas Bruce b. 1924; 11th Earl of Elgin, etc., 15th Earl of Kincardine, etc., 4th Baron Elgin
David Michael James Brudenell-Bruce b. 1952; 9th Marquess of Ailesbury, etc., 15th Earl of Cardigan, etc., 10th Earl of Ailesbury, 11th Baron Bruce of Tottenham	Charles Edward Bruce b. 1961 styled Lord Bruce
Heir apparent to the Earldom of Elgin and the Earldom of Kincardine
Thomas James Brudenell-Bruce b. 1982 styled Earl of Cardigan
Heir apparent to the Marquessate of Ailesbury and Earldom of Cardigan

== Clan Chief ==
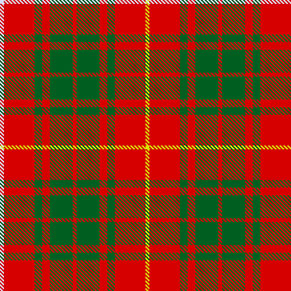
Bruce tartan

The current Chief, Andrew Bruce, 11th Earl of Elgin, is prominent in Scottish affairs and is convenor of the Standing Council of Scottish Chiefs.

== Branches ==

Earl of Elgin

Count Bruce

Bruce of Crionaich

- Bruce of Elgin
- Bruce of Annandale
- Bruce of Kincardine
- Bruce of the Russian Empire
- Bruce of Crionaich

== Castles ==
Castles that have belonged to the Clan Bruce include:

- Fyvie Castle
- Airth Castle
- Muness Castle
- Thomaston Castle
- Culross Palace
- Clackmannan Tower
- Fingask Castle
- Kinross House
- Lochleven Castle
- Lochmaben Castle
- Turnberry Castle

== See also ==
- Scottish Clan
- Earl of Elgin
- Earl of Kincardine
- Robert the Bruce
- Edward Bruce
- David Bruce
- Lord of Annandale

== Bibliography ==
- Blakely, Ruth Margaret (2005). The Brus family in England and Scotland, 1100–1295. Boydell Press. ISBN 978-1-84383-152-5.

*Royal House* Clan Bruce
Preceded by House of Balliol	Ruling House of the Kingdom of Scotland; 1306–1371	Succeeded by House of Stewart
