= Marquess of Ailesbury =

Title in the Peerage of the United Kingdom

Marquessate of Ailesbury
- Arms: Quarterly: 1st and 4th, Or a Saltire and Chief Gules on a Canton Argent a Lion rampant Azure (for Bruce); 2nd and 3rd, Argent a Chevron Gules between three Chapeaux to the sinister Azure (for Brudenell). Crests: 1st, a Lion statant with tail extended Azure. 2nd, a Sea-Horse maiant proper. Supporters: On either side a Savage proper, wreathed about the loins and temple Vert, and holding in the exterior hand a Banner of the arms of Bruce.
- Creation date: 17 July 1821
- Created by: King George IV
- Peerage: Peerage of the United Kingdom
- First holder: Charles Brudenell-Bruce, 2nd Earl of Ailesbury
- Present holder: David Brudenell-Bruce, 9th Marquess of Ailesbury
- Heir apparent: Thomas Brudenell-Bruce, Earl of Cardigan
- Remainder to: 1st Marquess's heirs male of the body lawfully begotten
- Subsidiary titles: Earl of Cardigan; Earl of Ailesbury; Earl Bruce; Viscount Savernake; Baron Brudenell; Baron Bruce; Baronet of Deene; Hereditary Warden of Savernake Forest
- Former seats: Tottenham House; Deene Park
- Motto: THINK AND THANK

Marquess of Ailesbury (later styled Aylesbury), in the County of Buckingham, is a title in the Peerage of the United Kingdom. It was created on 17 July 1821 for Charles Brudenell-Bruce, 2nd Earl of Ailesbury.

On 18 March 1664, Robert Bruce, 2nd Earl of Elgin in the Peerage of Scotland was created Baron Bruce, of Skelton in the County of York, Viscount Bruce, of Ampthill in the County of Bedford, and Earl of Ailesbury, in the County of Buckingham, all in the Peerage of England. His grandson, Charles, the 3rd Earl of Ailesbury (and 4th Earl of Elgin), was created Baron Bruce, of Tottenham in the County of Wilts, on 17 April 1746, in the Peerage of Great Britain, with a special remainder to his nephew, the Honourable Thomas Brudenell, fourth and youngest son of George Brudenell, 3rd Earl of Cardigan, by Lady Elizabeth Bruce, sister of the 3rd Earl of Ailesbury. On Lord Ailesbury's death in 1747, his English titles became extinct, except for the 1746 Barony of Bruce, which was inherited by his nephew, Robert, according to the special remainder. His Scottish titles passed to his kinsman, Charles Bruce, 5th Earl of Elgin.

Thomas Brudenell, 2nd Baron Bruce, assumed the additional surname of Bruce by Royal licence in 1767. On 10 June 1776 he was created Earl of Ailesbury, in the County of Buckingham, in the Peerage of Great Britain, a revival of the title which had become extinct on his uncle's death 29 years earlier. His son, Charles Brudenell-Bruce, 2nd Earl of Ailesbury was created Viscount Savernake, of Savernake Forest in the County of Wilts, Earl Bruce, of Whorlton in the County of York, and Marquess of Ailesbury, in the County of Buckingham, on 17 July 1821, all in the Peerage of the United Kingdom. In 1838 his eldest son, George Brudenell-Bruce, 2nd Marquess of Ailesbury, was summoned to the House of Lords through a writ of acceleration in his father's junior title of Baron Bruce. In 1868 the 2nd Marquess also inherited the Earldom of Cardigan from his kinsman the 7th Earl of Cardigan, and so the Marquesses of Ailesbury now also hold the titles Earl of Cardigan (1661) and Baron Brudenell, of Stonton in the County of Leicester (1628), in the Peerage of England, as well as being Baronets of England, styled "of Deene in the County of Northampton".

The 2nd Marquess was succeeded by his younger brother, Ernest Brudenell-Bruce, 3rd Marquess of Ailesbury, who had previously sat in the House of Commons for 46 years under the name of Lord Ernest Bruce. The 3rd Marquess was succeeded by his grandson, George Brudenell-Bruce, 4th Marquess of Ailesbury, the only son of George John Brudenell-Bruce. The 4th Marquess died bankrupt at an early age and was succeeded by his uncle, Henry Brudenell-Bruce, 5th Marquess of Ailesbury, who had previously represented Chippenham in Parliament under the name of Lord Henry Bruce. As of 2024, the titles are held by the 5th Marquess's great-great-grandson, David Brudenell-Bruce, 9th Marquess of Ailesbury, the titles having descended from father to son.

The heir apparent to the Marquessate bears the courtesy title Earl of Cardigan, and his heir apparent bears the title Viscount Savernake. Between 1776 and 1821 the heir apparent to the earldom of Ailesbury bore the courtesy title Lord Bruce. Between 1821 and 1868 the heir apparent to the marquessate bore the courtesy title Earl Bruce while Earl Bruce's heir apparent bore the title Viscount Savernake.

Ever since Thomas Bruce, 2nd Earl of Ailesbury succeeded his father in 1685, every Earl and Marquess of Ailesbury has also been a Hereditary Warden of Savernake Forest. This explains the usage of the title Viscount Savernake within the family. Although not an earl until 1685, Thomas Bruce had already inherited the Wardenship through his marriage to Lady Elizabeth Seymour in 1676, as the Wardenship had previously been in the Seymour family. The current Lord Ailesbury is the 31st such Warden, who became Warden in 1987 when his father retired from the role.

Lord Charles Bruce, youngest son of the 1st Marquess, was a Liberal politician. A descendant of the 3rd Marquess is the model Florence Brudenell-Bruce.

The family seat was Tottenham House, near Marlborough, Wiltshire. The family last lived in the house in 1945, after which it became a school, and was sold in 2015. The Estate is held in a trust, controlled by the family. In 2013, the heir to the marquessate, Earl of Cardigan, filed a lawsuit against the trustees, alleging mismanagement. As a result, the two Trustees were ordered to stand down.

== Coat of arms ==
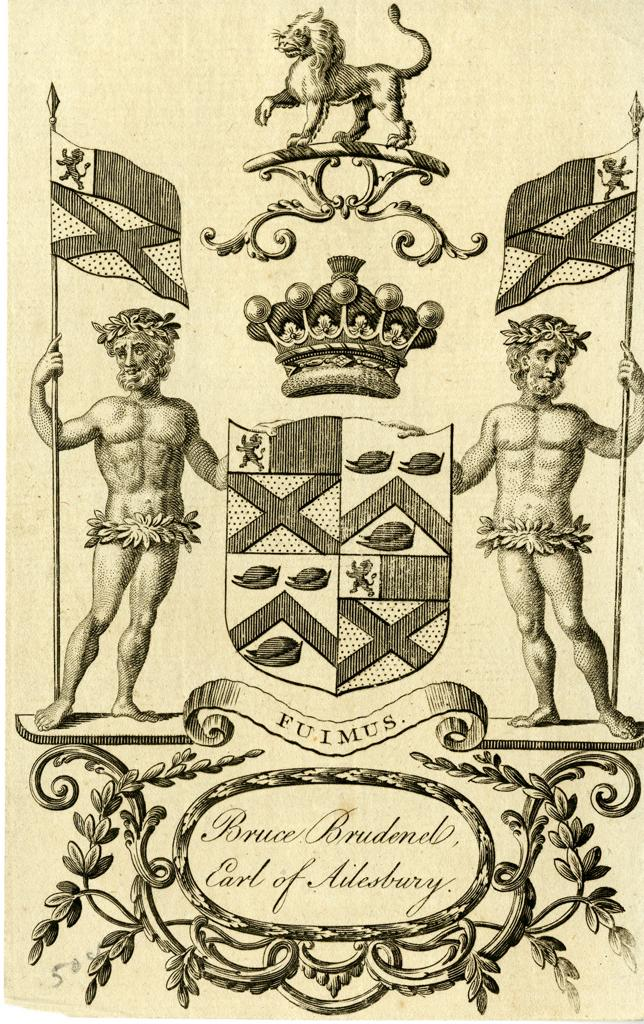
A bookplate showing the Brudenell-Bruce coat of arms.

The heraldic blazon for the coat of arms of the marquessate is: Quarterly: 1st and 4th, or a saltire and chief gules on a canton argent a lion rampant azure (for Bruce); 2nd and 3rd, argent a chevron gules between three chapeaux to the sinister azure (for Brudenell). This can be translated as: a shield divided into quarters, the top left and bottom right quarters being gold, with a red saltire over the gold field, and the top part of the shield also being red. In addition, there is a white square in the top left corner of the shield with a blue lion rampant (for the Bruce family); the top right and bottom left quarters are white with a red chevron between three blue caps of state that are turned to face to the viewer's right (for the Brudenell family).

== Earls of Ailesbury, Viscount Bruce, Baron Bruce: First creation (1664) ==
- Robert Bruce, 2nd Earl of Elgin, 1st Earl of Ailesbury (c. 1626–1685)
- Thomas Bruce, 3rd Earl of Elgin, 2nd Earl of Ailesbury (1656–1741)
- Charles Bruce, 4th Earl of Elgin, 3rd Earl of Ailesbury (1682–1747) (Created Baron Bruce in 1746 in the peerage of Great Britain with remainder to his nephew)

== Barons Bruce (1746) ==
- Charles Bruce, 4th Earl of Elgin, 3rd Earl of Ailesbury, 1st Baron Bruce (1682–1747)
- Thomas Brudenell-Bruce, 2nd Baron Bruce (1729–1814) (Younger nephew, created Earl of Ailesbury in 1776)

== Earls of Ailesbury; Second creation (1776) ==
- Thomas Brudenell-Bruce, 1st Earl of Ailesbury (1729–1814)
  - George Bruce-Brudenell, Lord Bruce (1762–1783)
- Charles Brudenell-Bruce, 2nd Earl of Ailesbury (1773–1856) (created Viscount Savernake, Earl Bruce, and Marquess of Ailesbury in 1821)

== Marquesses of Ailesbury (1821), Earls of Cardigan (inherited 1868) ==
- Charles Brudenell-Bruce, 1st Marquess of Ailesbury (1773–1856)
- George Brudenell-Bruce, 2nd Marquess of Ailesbury (1804–1878)
- Ernest Brudenell-Bruce, 3rd Marquess of Ailesbury (1811–1886)
  - George John Brudenell-Bruce (1839–1868)
- George Brudenell-Bruce, 4th Marquess of Ailesbury (1863–1894)
- Henry Brudenell-Bruce, 5th Marquess of Ailesbury (1842–1911)
- Chandos Brudenell-Bruce, 6th Marquess of Ailesbury (1873–1961)
- Cedric Brudenell-Bruce, 7th Marquess of Ailesbury (1904–1974)
- Michael Brudenell-Bruce, 8th Marquess of Ailesbury (1926–2024)
- David Brudenell-Bruce, 9th Marquess of Ailesbury (born 1951)

The heir apparent is the present holder's son, Thomas Brudenell-Bruce, Earl of Cardigan (born 1982).

Line of succession
- Ernest Brudenell-Bruce, 3rd Marquess of Ailesbury, 9th Earl of Cardigan (1811–1886)
  - George John Brudenell-Bruce (1839–1868)
    - George Brudenell-Bruce, 4th Marquess of Ailesbury, 10th Earl of Cardigan (1863–1894)
  - Henry Brudenell-Bruce, 5th Marquess of Ailesbury, 11th Earl of Cardigan (1842–1911)
    - George Brudenell-Bruce, 6th Marquess of Ailesbury, 12th Earl of Cardigan (1873–1961)
      - Cedric Brudenell-Bruce, 7th Marquess of Ailesbury, 13th Earl of Cardigan (1904–1974)
        - Michael Brudenell-Bruce, 8th Marquess of Ailesbury, 14th Earl of Cardigan (1926–2024)
          - David Brudenell-Bruce, 9th Marquess of Ailesbury, 15th Earl of Cardigan (b. 1951)
            - (1). Thomas Brudenell-Bruce, Earl of Cardigan (b. 1982)
  - Lord Robert Thomas Brudenell-Bruce (1845–1912)
    - George Lionel Thomas Brudenell (1880–1962)
      - Edmund Crispin Stephen James George Brudenell (1928–2014)
        - (2). Robert Edmund Brudenell (b. 1956)
          - (3). William Robert Brudenell (b. 2000)
        - (4). Thomas Mervyn Brudenell (b. 1956)
    - Robert Hanbury Brudenell-Bruce (1881–1955)
      - Chandos Robert Henry Brudenell-Bruce (1923–1993)
        - (5). Andrew Robert Joel Brudenell-Bruce (b. 1951)
          - (6). Henry Robert Wolf Brudenell-Bruce (b. 1976)
            - (7). Rowan Garvey Pema Brudenell-Bruce (b. 2002)
    - John Charles Brudenell-Bruce (1885–1960)
      - Simon Robert Brudenell-Bruce (1928–2008)
        - (8). Peter Gregory Brudenell-Bruce (b. 1965)
          - (9). Hayden Robert Brudenell-Bruce (b. 1998)
      - Marc Hadrian Brudenell-Bruce (1930–1965)
        - (10). Marc Raymond Christopher Brudenell-Bruce (b. 1962)

== Family tree ==
Brudenell and Bruce family tree including: Earls and Marquesses of Ailesbury, Earls of Cardigan, Earls of Elgin, and Earls of Kincardine family tree

Edward Bruce of Blairhall c. 1505–1565
Lord Kinloss, 1602 Lord Bruce of Kinloss, 1604; Lord Bruce of Kinloss, 1608
Edward Bruce; 1548–1611; 1st Lord Kinloss, etc.	George Bruce of Carnock c. 1550–1625	Margaret Primrose
Earl of Elgin and Baron Bruce of Whorlton in the County of York, 1633
Edward Bruce; 1594–1613; 2nd Lord Kinloss, etc.	Thomas Bruce; 1599–1663; 1st Earl of Elgin, etc., 3rd Lord Kinloss, etc.	Mary Preston	George Bruce (2nd) of Carnock d. 1643	Robert Bruce of Broomhall d. 1652
Earl of Ailesbury (1st creation), Viscount Bruce, and Baron Bruce of Skelton, 1664	Baron Brudenell of Stonton in the County of Leicester, 1628 Earl of Cardigan, 1661	Earl of Kincardine and Lord Bruce of Torry, 1647	See also: Dukes of Montrose family tree for the a different creation of the Earl of Kincardine 1644
Robert Bruce; 1627–1685; 2nd Earl of Elgin, etc., 1st Earl of Ailesbury, etc., 4th Lord Kinloss, etc.	Thomas Brudenell c. 1583–1663; 1st Earl of Cardigan, etc.	Edward Bruce d. 1662; 1st Earl of Kincardine, etc.	Alexander Bruce c. 1629–1680; 2nd Earl of Kincardine, etc.	Alexander Bruce d. 1706; 4th Earl of Kincardine, etc.
Thomas Bruce; 1656–1741; 3rd Earl of Elgin, etc., 2nd Earl of Ailesbury, etc., 5th Lord Kinloss, etc.	Robert Brudenell; 1607–1703; 2nd Earl of Cardigan, etc.	Alexander Bruce c. 1666–1705; 3rd Earl of Kincardine, etc.	Robert Bruce d. 1718; 5th Earl of Kincardine, etc.	Alexander Bruce; 1662–1721; 6th Earl of Kincardine, etc.	Thomas Bruce; 1663–1739/1740; 7th Earl of Kincardine, etc.
Baron Bruce of Tottenham in the County of Wilts, 1746
Charles Bruce; 1682–1747; 4th Earl of Elgin, etc., 3rd Earl of Ailesbury, etc., 6th Lord Kinloss, etc., 1st Baron Bruce of Tottenham	George Brudenell; 1685–1732; 3rd Earl of Cardigan, etc.	Elizabeth Brudenell; 1689–1745	William Bruce; 1710–1740; 8th Earl of Kincardine, etc.
Earldom of Ailesbury, Viscountcy of Bruce, Whorlton Barony Bruce, Barony of Bruce of Skelton, and Lordship of Kinloss extinct, 1747
Earl of Ailesbury Buckinghamshire, Great Britain (2nd creation), 1747
George Brudenell, later Montagu; 1712–1790; Duke of Montagu, Marquess of Monthermer, 4th Earl of Cardigan, etc.	James Brudenell; 1725–1811; 5th Earl of Cardigan, etc.	Robert Brudenell; 1726–1768	Thomas Brudenell-Bruce; 1729–1814; 1st Earl of Ailesbury, 2nd Baron Bruce of Tottenham	Charles Bruce; 1732–1771; 5th Earl of Elgin, etc., 9th Earl of Kincardine, etc.
Marquess of Ailesbury, Earl Bruce of Whorlton, County of York, and Viscount Savernake of Savernake Forest, Wiltshire, 1821
Robert Brudenell; 1760–1837; 6th Earl of Cardigan, etc.	Charles Brudenell-Bruce; 1773–1856; 1st Marquess of Ailesbury, etc., 2nd Earl of Ailesbury, 3rd Baron Bruce of Tottenham	William Robert Bruce; 1764–1771; 6th Earl of Elgin, etc., 10th Earl of Kincardine, etc.	Thomas Bruce; 1766–1841; 7th Earl of Elgin, etc., 11th Earl of Kincardine, etc.
Baron Elgin of Elgin, 1849
James Brudenell🐴 1797–1868; 7th Earl of Cardigan, etc.	George Brudenell-Bruce; 1804–1878; 2nd Marquess of Ailesbury, etc., 8th Earl of Cardigan, etc., 3rd Earl of Ailesbury, 4th Baron Bruce of Tottenham	Ernest Brudenell-Bruce; 1811–1886; 3rd Marquess of Ailesbury, etc., 9th Earl of Cardigan, etc., 4th Earl of Ailesbury, 5th Baron Bruce of Tottenham	James Bruce; 1811–1863; 8th Earl of Elgin, etc., 12th Earl of Kincardine, etc., 1st Baron Elgin
George John Brudenell-Bruce; 1839–1868	Henry Brudenell-Bruce; 1842–1911; 5th Marquess of Ailesbury, etc., 11th Earl of Cardigan, etc., 6th Earl of Ailesbury, 7th Baron Bruce of Tottenham	Victor Alexander Bruce; 1849–1917; 9th Earl of Elgin, etc., 13th Earl of Kincardine, etc., 2nd Baron Elgin
George William Thomas Brudenell-Bruce; 1863–1894; 4th Marquess of Ailesbury, etc., 10th Earl of Cardigan, etc., 5th Earl of Ailesbury, 6th Baron Bruce of Tottenham	George William James Chandos Brudenell-Bruce; 1873–1961; 6th Marquess of Ailesbury, etc., 12th Earl of Cardigan, etc., 7th Earl of Ailesbury, 8th Baron Bruce of Tottenham	Edward James Bruce; 1881–1968; 10th Earl of Elgin, etc., 14th Earl of Kincardine, etc., 3rd Baron Elgin
Chandos Sydney Cedric Brudenell-Bruce; 1904–1974; 7th Marquess of Ailesbury, etc., 13th Earl of Cardigan, etc., 8th Earl of Ailesbury, 9th Baron Bruce of Tottenham
Michael Sydney Cedric Brudenell-Bruce; 1926–2024; 8th Marquess of Ailesbury, etc., 14th Earl of Cardigan, etc., 9th Earl of Ailesbury, 10th Baron Bruce of Tottenham	Andrew Douglas Alexander Thomas Bruce b. 1924; 11th Earl of Elgin, etc., 15th Earl of Kincardine, etc., 4th Baron Elgin
David Michael James Brudenell-Bruce b. 1952; 9th Marquess of Ailesbury, etc., 15th Earl of Cardigan, etc., 10th Earl of Ailesbury, 11th Baron Bruce of Tottenham	Charles Edward Bruce b. 1961 styled Lord Bruce
Heir apparent to the Earldom of Elgin and the Earldom of Kincardine
Thomas James Brudenell-Bruce b. 1982 styled Earl of Cardigan
Heir apparent to the Marquessate of Ailesbury and Earldom of Cardigan

== Notes ==
=== Works cited ===
- Cokayne, George E. (1910). Gibbs, Vicary (ed.). The complete peerage of England, Scotland, Ireland, Great Britain and the United Kingdom, extant, extinct, or dormant. Vol. I, Ab-Adam to Basing. London: St. Catherine Press. pp. 59–66.
