= Savernake Horn =

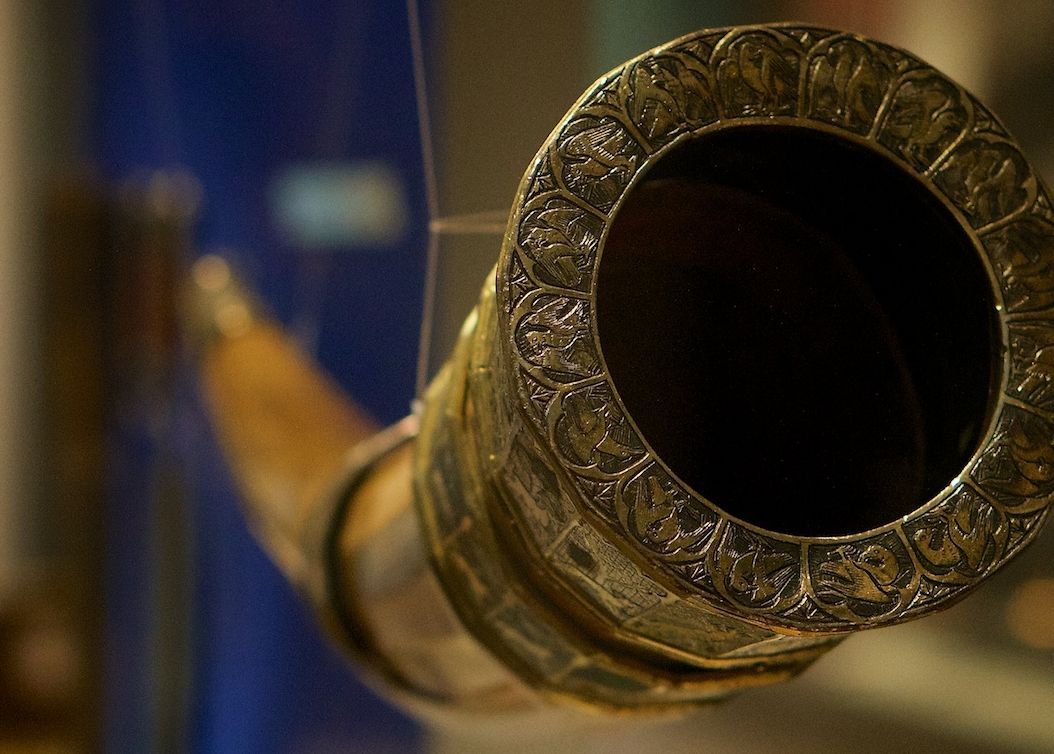
Savernake Horn in the British Museum

The Savernake Horn is a horn made of 12th-century elephant ivory decorated with 14th-century enamelled silver gilt mounts; it belonged to the Seymour family since at least the Elizabethan period, and is associated with Savernake Forest in Wiltshire, England. It is an olifant/oliphant horn, a hunting horn made from an elephant (olifant) tusk, and is also known as the "Bruce Horn" as it was presented to Thomas Lord Bruce. It is owned by the British Museum.

== Description ==
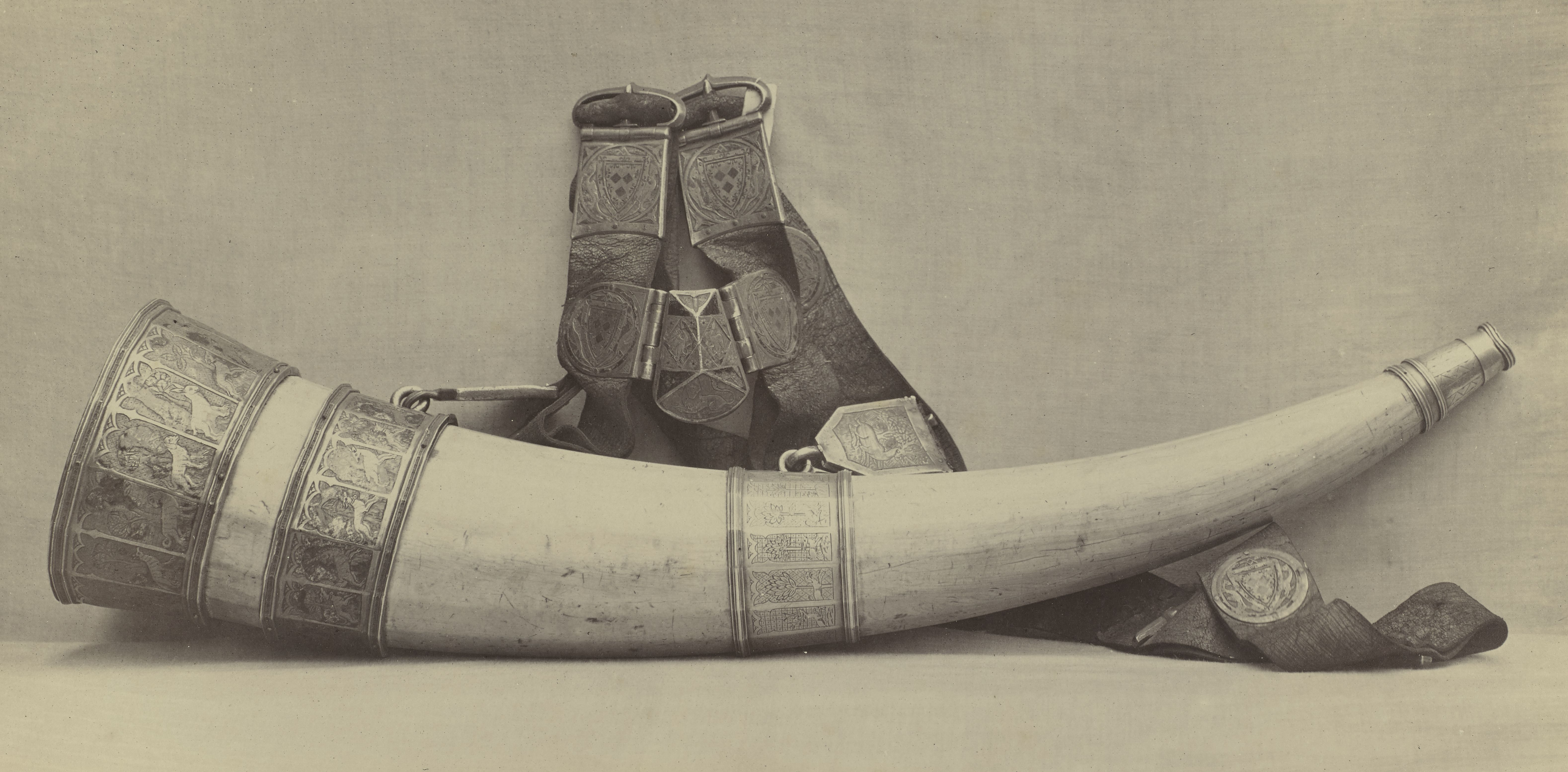
Savernake Horn on exhibition in 1862

The silver gilt mounts each contain sixteen compartments, one for each carved facet on the horn. The internal rim of the upper band depicts sixteen hawks preening themselves. The outward faces of both bands show engravings of animals of the chase, including the mythical unicorn and a lion. In the centre of the upper band is depicted a king in conversation with a bishop, and a forester alongside, possibly indicating the making of an historic appointment of Forester.

== History ==
The horn was noted by William Camden (1551–1623) who stated it then belonged to the Seymour family, possibly an heirloom inherited from their Sturmy ancestors, hereditary Wardens of Savernake Forest, though was probably made for the Earl of Moray in the fourteenth century and looted by the English in the mid-16th century.

The horn was sounded in 1940 by King George VI when he visited Savernake Forest. In 1975, the 8th Marquess of Ailesbury, hereditary warden of Savernake Forest, sold the horn and it was subsequently bought by the British Museum for £210,000.
