= Andrew Bruce, 11th Earl of Elgin =

British noble

Lieutenant Colonel The Right Honourable The Earl of Elgin KT CD JP
- 11th Earl of Elgin
- Tenure: 1968–present
- Full name: Andrew Douglas Alexander Thomas Bruce
- Other titles: Lord Bruce (1924–1968)
- Born: Andrew Douglas Alexander Thomas Bruce, Lord Bruce; 17 February 1924 (age 102); Broomhall House, Fife, Scotland
- Residence: Broomhall House, nr. Dunfermline, Scotland
- Offices: Chief of Clan Bruce; Lord Lieutenant of Fife; Lord High Commissioner to the General Assembly of the Church of Scotland
- Spouse: Victoria Usher (m. 1959; died 2024)
- Issue: 5, including Adam
- Parents: The 10th Earl of Elgin; Katherine Cochrane
- Military career
- Allegiance: United Kingdom
- Branch: British Army
- Service years: 1943–46, 1951–65, 1976–86
- Rank: Lieutenant Colonel
- Service number: 293466
- Unit: Scots Guards
- Conflicts: Second World War: Operation Bluecoat
- Awards: Order of the Thistle; Canadian Forces' Decoration

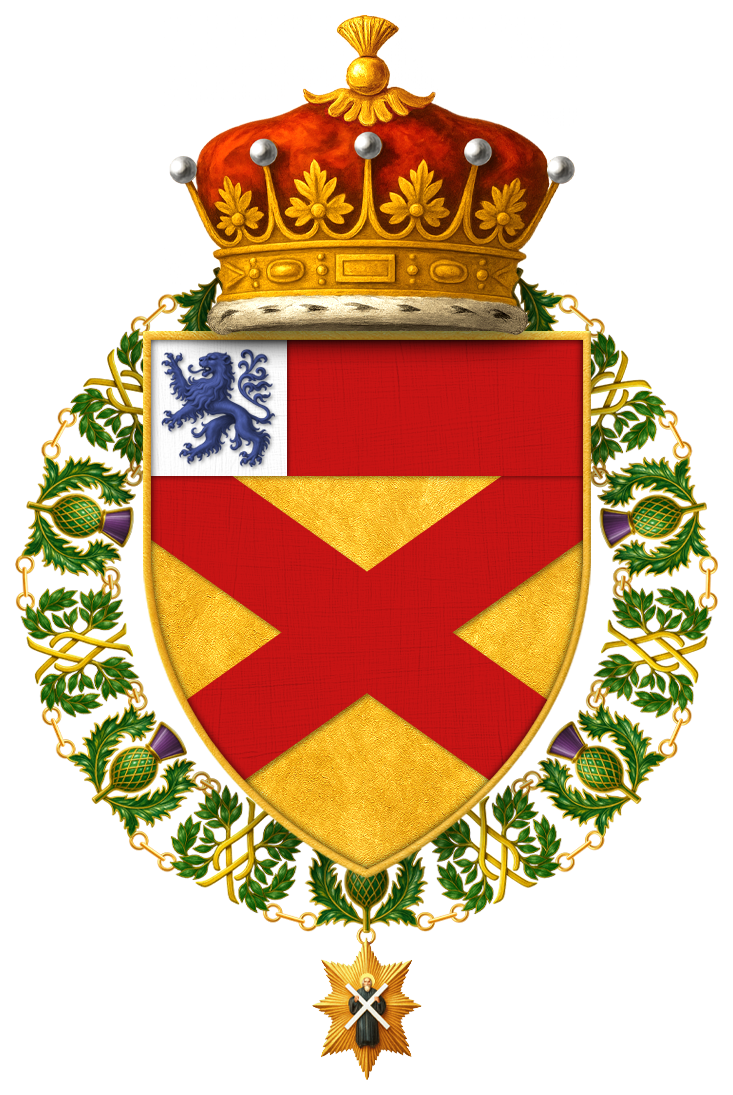
Shield of Arms of Andrew Douglas Alexander Thomas Bruce, 11th Earl of Elgin and 15th Earl of Kincardine, KT, CD, JP, DL

Andrew Douglas Alexander Thomas Bruce, 11th Earl of Elgin and 15th Earl of Kincardine (born 17 February 1924), styled Lord Bruce before 1968, is a Scottish peer and Chief of Clan Bruce.

== Early life and education ==
Elgin was born in 1924 at the family seat, Broomhall House, in Fife, the eldest son of the 10th Earl of Elgin and Katherine Elizabeth, Countess of Elgin, daughter of the 1st Baron Cochrane of Cults. The arrival of a male heir following the births of two daughters, Lady Martha and Lady Jean, created tremendous celebration at the Broomhall estate, which included a bonfire and fireworks attended by crowds of villagers from Limekilns and Charlestown. He was styled Lord Bruce from birth and christened at Broomhall on 31 March 1924 by his great-uncle Rev. Henry Holmes Stewart. His five god-parents were Field Marshal Earl Haig, his uncle the Hon. Thomas Cochrane, Sir Alexander Gibb; Lord Elgin's elder sister, Lady Elisabeth Babington Smith; and Lady Victoria Cavendish-Bentinck, daughter of the Duke of Portland.

He was educated at Eton and at Balliol College, Oxford.

== Military career ==
On 12 September 1943, Bruce was commissioned as a Second Lieutenant in the 3rd (Armoured) Bn Scots Guards and was wounded during Operation Bluecoat, the breakout from Normandy in August 1944. He was invalided out of the army on 24 October 1946, with the honorary rank of lieutenant.

On 4 April 1951, he was appointed an instructor in the Army Cadet Force, with the rank of Lieutenant. In July 1963, by then the County Cadet Commandant for Fife, he was awarded the Cadet Forces Medal. He resigned his commission on 19 April 1965, retaining the honorary rank of lieutenant-colonel. Since 1970, he has been Colonel-in-Chief of the 31 Combat Engineer Regiment (The Elgins), and was Honorary Colonel of the 153 (Highland) Transport Regiment from 1976 to 1986.

== Career ==
Elgin has held a number of business appointments, including as President of the Scottish Amicable Life Assurance Society (1975–1994), and Chairman of the National Savings Committee for Scotland. He was also President of the Royal Scottish Automobile Club.

He was appointed a Justice of the Peace (JP) in 1951, was Deputy Lieutenant (DL) of Fife 1955–1987, and Lord Lieutenant 1987–1999. In 1980, he was appointed by Queen Elizabeth II as her Lord High Commissioner to the General Assembly of the Church of Scotland and reappointed in 1981. In 1981, the Queen appointed him as a Knight of the Thistle (KT). He was awarded the Canadian Forces' Decoration in 1981. He is a former Captain of the Royal Company of Archers and a former convenor of the Standing Council of Scottish Chiefs.

He was County Cadet Commandant for Fife from 1952 to 1965, Brigade President of the Boys' Brigade from 1966 to 1985, and Grand Master Mason of Scotland from 1961 to 1965.

He is a Freeman of Bridgetown, Regina, Saskatchewan, Port Elgin, Winnipeg, Manitoba, St. Thomas, Ontario, and Moose Jaw, Saskatchewan. Lord Elgin is a Past President of the Royal Caledonian Curling Club, and is the Life President of the Broomhall Curling Club. He skippered the Scottish curling teams that defeated the Governor-General of Canada's teams in a series of matches in Ottawa in 1982.

Lord Elgin is Chief of Clan Bruce and President of the Bruce Family Organization which is the main association for members of the Bruce family.

== Honours ==

Country	Ribbon	Description	Notes
Scotland		Order of the Thistle (KT)	Knight; 1981
United Kingdom		1939–1945 Star	
United Kingdom		France and Germany Star	
United Kingdom		Defence Medal	
United Kingdom		War Medal	
United Kingdom		Queen Elizabeth II Coronation Medal	1953
United Kingdom		Queen Elizabeth II Silver Jubilee Medal	1977; UK Version of this Medal
United Kingdom		Queen Elizabeth II Golden Jubilee Medal	2002; UK Version of this Medal
United Kingdom		Queen Elizabeth II Diamond Jubilee Medal	2012; UK Version of this Medal
United Kingdom		Queen Elizabeth II Platinum Jubilee Medal	2022; UK Version of this Medal
United Kingdom		King Charles III Coronation Medal	2023; UK Version of this Medal
United Kingdom		Cadet Forces Medal	July 1963
Canada		Canadian Forces' Decoration (CD)	1981; With 4 Clasps

=== Honorary military appointments ===
Military Branch	Date	Regiment	Position
(Canada) Canadian Army	1970 – present	31 Combat Engineer Regiment (The Elgins)	Colonel-in-Chief
(United Kingdom) British Army	1976–1986	153 (Highland) Transport Regiment (TA)	Honorary Colonel
(Canada) Canadian Army		No. 7 (St. Thomas) Royal Canadian Army Cadets	Honorary Colonel

== Family ==
In 1959 he married Victoria Mary Usher and they had five children:

- Lady Georgina Mary Bruce, (born 4 June 1960)
- Charles Edward Bruce, Lord Bruce DL, (born 19 October 1961); was married (29 July 1990 – 1996) to Amanda Leigh Grimes née Movius with three children; Antonia Jean Bruce (born 14 December 1990), James Andrew Charles Robert Bruce, Master of Bruce (born 16 November 1991) and George Benjamin Thomas Bruce (born 5 July 1993). Bruce later married Dr Alice Enders on 5 May 2001 and, following a divorce, Sheree Cosgrove on 19 August 2023
- Lady Antonia Katherine Bruce, (born 30 August 1964); married Marcel Ballot (1989–)
- The Hon. Adam Robert Bruce CStJ WS, (born 18 January 1968); married Donna Maria-Sofia Giovanna Rose Granito Pignatelli di Belmonte (17 May 2003–) with two children; Robert Frederick Angelo Bruce (born 7 January 2007) and Orlando Antonio Andrew Bruce (born 12 September 2008)
- The Hon. Alexander Victor Bruce, (born 31 March 1971); married Victoria M. Bythell on 26 September 1998 with three children; Rosemary Katherine Bruce (born 26 April 2000), Ella Victoria Bruce (born 25 April 2002), and Lily Alexandra Bruce (born 3 November 2005)

The Countess of Elgin and Kincardine was the Patron of both the Royal Caledonian Ball and Edinburgh’s Queen Margaret University. The Earl succeeded to the earldoms and other family titles on the death of his father in 1968.

The Earl celebrated his 100th birthday on the 17 February 2024. He was interviewed by the BBC as part of a project to record the memories of Second World War veterans, marking the 80th anniversary of D-Day on 6 June 2024.

On 15 November 2024, Elgin's wife of 65 years, Victoria, Countess of Elgin, died aged 85.

== Notes ==
Masonic offices
Preceded by The Earl of Eglinton	Grand Master Mason of the Grand Lodge of Scotland; 1961–1965	Succeeded by Sir Ronald Orr-Ewing
Honorary titles
Preceded by Sir John Gilmour	Lord Lieutenant of Fife; 1987–1999	Succeeded by Margaret Dean
Peerage of Scotland
Preceded by Edward Bruce	Earl of Elgin; Earl of Kincardine; 1968–present	Incumbent
Orders of precedence in the United Kingdom
Preceded by The Rt. Hon. The Earl of Kinnoull	Gentlemen; The Rt. Hon. The Earl of Elgin & Kincardine	Succeeded by The Rt. Hon. The Earl of Wemyss & March
