= Cedric Brudenell-Bruce, 7th Marquess of Ailesbury =

British peer

The Most Honourable The Marquess of Ailesbury CStJ DL JP
- The Marquess in March 1925.
- Born: Chandos Sydney Cedric Brudenell-Bruce; 26 January 1904
- Died: 15 July 1974 (aged 70)
- Education: Christ Church, Oxford
- Occupations: Politician; author; officer
- Office: Justice of the Peace for Wiltshire
- Spouses: Joan Salter (m. 1924; died 1937); Joyce Quennell (m. 1944; div. 1948); Jean Wilson (m. 1950)
- Children: 3, including Michael
- Parents: Chandos Brudenell-Bruce, 6th Marquess of Ailesbury; Caroline Madden
- Military career
- Allegiance: United Kingdom
- Branch: British Army
- Rank: Major
- Conflicts: Second World War

Chandos Sydney Cedric Brudenell-Bruce, 7th Marquess of Ailesbury CStJ, DL, JP (26 January 1904 – 15 July 1974), styled Earl of Cardigan or Lord Cardigan between 1911 and 1961, was a British peer. He was known by his middle name, Cedric.

== Background and education ==
He was the son of Chandos Brudenell-Bruce, 6th Marquess of Ailesbury, and Caroline Sydney Anne Madden. He was educated at Eton and Christ Church, Oxford.

== Career ==
Brudenell-Bruce became justice of the peace for Wiltshire in 1938. In the Second World War he served in the Royal Army Service Corps, during which time he was Mentioned in Despatches. He was captured and spent time as a prisoner of war, but escaped. In 1950 he held office as deputy lieutenant of Wiltshire. He was a County Councillor for Wiltshire in 1961. He was invested as a Commander of the Order of St. John of Jerusalem. He wrote the following books, under the name Cardigan: Youth goes East, 1928; The Amateur Pilot, 1933; The Wardens of Savernake Forest, 1949; I Walked Alone, 1950; The Life and Loyalties of Thomas Bruce, 1951. He succeeded his father in the marquessate on the latter's death on 4 August 1961. After succeeding to his father's titles, he wrote two more books, under the name Ailesbury: The History of Savernake Forest, 1962; Setting My Watch by the Sundial, 1970.

This last book, Setting My Watch by the Sundial, was a short memoir that shed a lot of interesting light upon his personal life, a large part of which was related to the books he wrote. According to this book, in the early 1920s, he was an avid fan of cars, and took every opportunity to drive the latest models. During this period of his life, he was involved in certain sports car publications, reviewing cars and racing events. His first book, Youth Goes East, chronicled his journey across Europe in a sponsored car with his wife and a friend. The whole trip was an elaborate advertising campaign sponsored by a prominent car company, to show off the durability of their new model. In the process, the book made many observations about parts of Europe that were still crumbling with decay in the wake of the First World War some 10 years prior. The book itself made no mention of the sponsorship, or the specific model of the car used, since the book was unrelated to the ad campaign.

In the late 1920s and early 1930s, Cedric became a fan of flying small aeroplanes. In his 1933 book, Amateur Pilot, he wrote a sort of guide to flying planes in an era where one needed nothing more than a plane and an empty field to take a flight around the country.

With the outbreak of the Second World War, Cedric became an officer in the Army, and was captured early in 1940. After his escape, he made his way through Europe on foot, down through France to Spain, all the while taking notes of his exploits, which were later published into his fourth book in 1950, I Walked Alone. Upon returning to England, Cedric took a less active role in the military, mostly as a flight instructor. Meanwhile, at his home in Wiltshire, his father was overseeing the transformation of the family estate and its dense forest into a vast munitions depot for the army. While I Walked Alone only addresses the escape, Setting My Watch continues to detail his activities in the military throughout the war. At the conclusion of the war in Europe, Cedric was chosen to set up and run several Displaced persons camps.

Upon retiring from active duty in 1945, and returning to England, Cedric took up residence at The Old Laundry on the family estate in Wiltshire. However, the family seat, Tottenham House, was converted into a boys' school. In the process of making way for the school, Cedric went into the basement, and found hundreds of boxes full of old family documents. The ensuing research led to the creation of his third book, The Wardens of Savernake Forest, which is a detailed look at the history of his family, and the unbroken line of succession within the family of the Hereditary Wardens who had overseen Savernake Forest (one of the Royal Forests) since the days of William the Conqueror. Savernake Forest was the property of the Crown until the 1540s, when Edward Seymour, 1st Duke of Somerset secured ownership of the forest. Since then, the forest has been the private property of the family. The special nature of the Wardenship had previously allowed succession to pass to a female heir, rather than falling to the next male heir outside the immediate family. This tradition was maintained after the forest came into the possession of the family, allowing the forest property to pass from the Seymour family, to the Bruce family, and to the Brudenell-Bruce family. Cedric's research was originally published in a local historical society magazine, the Wiltshire Archaeological and Natural History Magazine, between 1946 and 1948.

Further family research led to the publication of Cedric's fifth book, The Life and Loyalties of Thomas Bruce: A Biography of Thomas, Earl of Ailesbury and Elgin, Gentlemen of the Bed-chamber to King Charles II and to King James II, 1656–1741. For more information about this ancestor, see Thomas Bruce, 2nd Earl of Ailesbury.

Cedric's sixth book, The History of Savernake Forest, was an updated version of his previous book about the Forest. The Wardens focused more on the individuals in charge of the forest, while The History focused more on the transformation of the forest itself over the past 1,000 years, as its boundaries were constantly expanded and contracted, and as its trees became denser, and as the deer were moved from one park to another. (See the History section of Royal Forests for more details.) Additionally, while The Wardens ended in Edwardian times, The History touched upon the events of the 20th century leading up to the transition from family control to government control. In modern times, the costs of maintaining the forest became prohibitive, and the family leased the forest to the Forestry Commission for 999 years.

Cedric moved to Jersey in the late 1960s, to avoid taxes. He spent the rest of his life outside England. The title of his last book Setting My Watch by the Sundial was a reference to Thomas Bruce, which is explained at the beginning of that book. All of the above information regarding Ailesbury's books is taken from Setting My Watch by the Sundial, which mentioned all of his books by name.

== Marriages ==
Lord Ailesbury was married three times.

His first wife was Joan Houlton Salter, daughter of Stephen Salter (architect), on 5 July 1924; she died on 24 July 1937 by jumping from a seventh floor window of the Savoy Hotel. Their children were Michael Brudenell-Bruce, 8th Marquess of Ailesbury (1926–2024) and Lord Chandos Gerald Piers Brudenell-Bruce (1929–1980).

His second marriage was to Joyce Quennell (1917-2000), daughter of Charles Warwick-Evans and former wife of Peter Courtney Quennell, on 11 March 1944. The couple were divorced in 1948.

His third marriage was to Jean Frances Margaret Wilson, daughter of John Addison Wilson, on 20 February 1950. The couple had one child, Lord Charles Adam Brudenell-Bruce (1951–2025). Jean died in 1999.

== Sources ==
- 'AILESBURY', Who Was Who, A & C Black, 1920–2007; online edn, Oxford University Press, Dec 2007.
- Peter W. Hammond, editor, The Complete Peerage or a History of the House of Lords and All its Members From the Earliest Times, Volume XIV: Addenda & Corrigenda (Stroud, Gloucestershire, U.K.: Sutton Publishing, 1998).
- G.E. Cokayne; with Vicary Gibbs, H.A. Doubleday, Geoffrey H. White, Duncan Warrand and Lord Howard de Walden, editors, The Complete Peerage of England, Scotland, Ireland, Great Britain and the United Kingdom, Extant, Extinct or Dormant, new ed., 13 volumes in 14 (1910–1959; reprint in 6 volumes, Gloucester, U.K.: Alan Sutton Publishing, 2000).
- Cardigan. Youth Goes East. London: Eveleigh Nash and Grayson, 1928. Print.
- Cardigan. Amateur Pilot. London: Putnam, 1933. Print.
- Cardigan. The Wardens of Savernake Forest. London: Routledge and Kegan Paul, 1949. Print.
- Cardigan. The Life and Loyalties of Thomas Bruce. London: Routledge and Kegan Paul, 1950. Print.
- Cardigan. I Walked Alone. London: Routledge and Kegan Paul, 1951. Print.
- Ailesbury. A History of Savernake Forest. Devizes, Wiltshire: Charles H. Woodward, 1962. Print.
- Ailesbury, Cedric, Marquess of. Setting My Watch by the Sundial. Devizes, Wiltshire: Charles H. Woodward, 1970. Print.

Peerage of the United Kingdom
Preceded by Chandos Brudenell-Bruce	Marquess of Ailesbury; 1961–1974	Succeeded by Michael Brudenell-Bruce
