= Chandos Brudenell-Bruce, 6th Marquess of Ailesbury =

British peer and officer of the auxiliary forces

The Most Honourable; The Marquess of Ailesbury; DSO TD KStJ DL JP
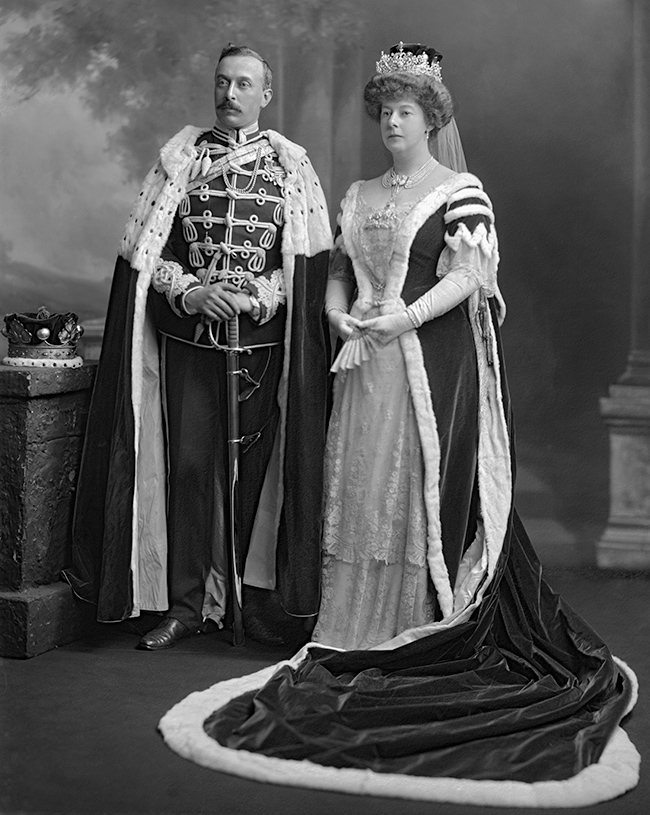
- The Marquess and Marchioness of Ailesbury wearing robes for the Coronation in 1911

Marquess of Ailesbury
- Tenure: 1911–1961
- Predecessor: Henry Brudenell-Bruce
- Successor: Chandos Sydney Cedric Brudenell-Bruce
- Born: George William James Chandos Brudenell-Bruce; 21 May 1873; Tawstock Court, Devon, England
- Died: 4 August 1961 (aged 88); Jersey
- Spouses: Caroline Sydney Anne Madden (m. 1903; died 1941); Mabel Irene Lindsay (m. 1945; died 1954); Alice Maude Emily Pinhey (m. 1955; died 1960)
- Issue: Cedric Brudenell-Bruce, 7th Marquess of Ailesbury; Lady Ursula Taylor; Lady Rosemary Brudenell-Bruce
- Father: Henry Brudenell-Bruce
- Mother: Georgiana Sophia Maria Pinckney
- Military career
- Allegiance: United Kingdom
- Branch: British Army
- Rank: Captain
- Conflicts: Second Boer War; First World War
- Awards: Companion of the Distinguished Service Order; Mentioned in dispatches; Territorial Decoration; Knight of Grace of the Order of St John

George William James Chandos Brudenell-Bruce, 6th Marquess of Ailesbury, DSO, TD, KStJ, DL, JP (21 May 1873 – 4 August 1961), styled Earl of Cardigan between 1894 and 1911, was a British peer and an officer of the auxiliary forces. He went by the name Chandos throughout his life - he signed this name to childhood letters, and family correspondence refers to him so. His hand-written memoirs, which are held at the Wiltshire and Swindon History Centre, supply many details about his life.

== Background and education ==
Brudenell-Bruce was the son of Henry Brudenell-Bruce, 5th Marquess of Ailesbury and Georgiana Sophia Maria Pinckney (1848-1902). He spent his childhood at Tawstock Court, near Barnstaple in Devon, a grand house rented by his mother's family, who owned a banking business. From the age of 10 he attended school at Gore Court, near Sittingbourne in Kent, and from the age of 13, Westminster School. Persistently unhappy at Westminster, he writes in his memoir of his relief at a bout of typhoid fever forcibly ending his time there aged 16.

He succeeded to the title Lord Cardigan on his father's accession to the marquessate on 10 April 1894, and succeeded his father in the marquessate on the latter's death on 10 March 1911.

== Career ==
Lord Ailesbury served in the 3rd (Highland Borderers Militia) Battalion, Argyll and Sutherland Highlanders; the Royal Wiltshire Yeomanry; the Middlesex Yeomanry; the Wiltshire Regiment; and the Royal Field Artillery

Coat of Arms of George Brudenell-Bruce

He was promoted to the rank of captain in the Royal Wiltshire Yeomanry on 3 September 1898, supernumerary to the establishment. He fought with the regiment in the Second Boer War, for which he was mentioned in dispatches, and was appointed a Companion of the Distinguished Service Order in November 1900. He was confirmed as a captain on the establishment in May 1902. He fought in the Great War, during which he was again mentioned in dispatches and he received the Territorial Decoration for his service in the Territorial Force. Postwar he commanded 220 (Wiltshire) Battery in 55th (Wessex) Brigade, Royal Field Artillery.

His son Cedric writes, in an addendum to Brudenell-Bruce's memoir dated shortly after the latter's death, that one of the defining attributes of Brudenell-Bruce's life was his relation to the military, and, more particularly, his difficulty in persuading the military to accept him. On ending his education prematurely, he sought to enrol via a militia, and was gazetted to the Argyll and Sutherland Highlanders at Stirling in 1890. He spent 5 years during the 1890s studying at a "crammer" at Bristol, during which period it became clear that his eyesight was too poor for regular army membership. Following this, his military affiliation was switched from the militia to the county yeomanry, which he comments was "a great step-down".

In early 1899, he and his friend Richard "Dick" Hennessy (1876-1953) undertook an extended trip to India. On the boat journey there, he met his first wife, who was travelling the same route. Brudenell-Bruce toured extensively through and beyond the Indian subcontinent. Later in the year, word reached him in Mandalay that war in South Africa was imminent, and he made haste to make himself available to the British forces. Despite having no commission, he purchased horses and sailed for Durban in October 1899. In South Africa, he was found a role working in the supply corps, in which capacity he served during both the Siege of Ladysmith and the Advance on Pretoria. He left South Africa in September 1900.

Continuing as a member of the territorials, Brudenell-Bruce was mobilised for World War I in August 1914, and was deployed to the Western Front in November 1915, serving through the remainder of the war with the supply corps. He was demobilised in November 1919.

He was invested as a Knight of Grace of the Order of St John of Jerusalem. He was appointed a Deputy Lieutenant of Wiltshire on 19 July 1920, and was a Justice of the Peace.

He was involved in conservative and right-wing politics and during the 1920s was a member of the reactionary British Fascists. He seems to have later thought better of fascist affiliations, and in 1943 wrote regarding Oswald Mosley that Mosley had been "bitten with the virus of Fascism".

Chandos was involved in the process of converting the family estate and its surrounding forest into a munitions depot and military base during the Second World War. Despite his age (66 in 1939), Brudenell-Bruce was a member of his local Home Guard until 1944.

== Family ==
He was married three times. Firstly he married Caroline Sydney Anne Madden (1866-1941), known as Sydney, daughter of John Madden (1836-1902) and Caroline Clements (1842-1914) of Hilton Park, County Monaghan, on 21 March 1903 at St Mark's, Mayfair, whom he had met while travelling to India in 1899. They had three children:

- Cedric Brudenell-Bruce, 7th Marquess of Ailesbury (1904–1974);
- Lady Ursula Daphne Brudenell-Bruce (1905–1991), who married Alfred Thomas Taylor (1906-1976) in 1944; and
- Lady Rosemary Enid Brudenell-Bruce (1907–1985), who never married.

Sydney died on 5 May 1941 after a long period of ill health.

Secondly he married Mabel Irene Lindsay (1907–1954), known as Irene, daughter of John Samuel Lindsay (1873–1940) and Mary Ellen Guest (1873–1911), on 21 February 1945. Irene had been one of Sydney's nurses. Together, they moved away from Wiltshire, first to London, and then in 1946 to St Saviour, Jersey. Irene died of throat cancer on 26 June 1954, aged 47.

Thirdly, he married on 9 July 1955 Alice Maude Emily Pinhey (1871–1960), known as Maude, daughter of Captain John Forbes Pinhey (1843–1876) and Mary Anne Charlotte Worsley (1845–1925), and widow of John Henry Arthur Boyce (1864–1911), Francis Shand Byam Johnson (1869–1938), and Rowland Money (1875–1953). Chandos and Maude had originally courted in the 1890s before marrying other people. Maude died on 9 February 1960.

Peerage of the United Kingdom
Preceded by Henry Brudenell-Bruce	Marquess of Ailesbury; 1911–1961	Succeeded by Cedric Brudenell-Bruce
