= George Brudenell-Bruce, 4th Marquess of Ailesbury =

The Most Honourable The Marquess of Ailesbury
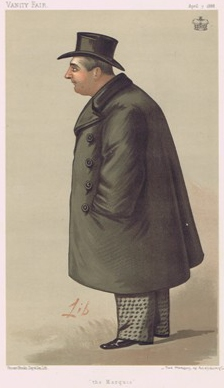
- William Brudenell-Bruce, 4th Marquess of Ailesbury, as caricatured by Liborio Prosperi in Vanity Fair, April 1888

Marquess of Ailesbury
- Tenure: 1883–1894
- Predecessor: Ernest Brudenell-Bruce
- Successor: Henry Brudenell-Bruce
- Born: George William Thomas Brudenell-Bruce; 8 June 1863
- Died: 10 April 1894 (aged 30); Brixton, England
- Spouse: Dorothy Julia Haseley (m. 1884)
- Father: George John Brudenell-Bruce
- Mother: Evelyn Mary Craven

George William Thomas Brudenell-Bruce, 4th Marquess of Ailesbury (8 June 1863 – 10 April 1894), styled Viscount Savernake from 1878 to 1886, was the son of George John Brudenell-Bruce and Lady Evelyn Mary Craven, and succeeded his grandfather as 4th Marquess on the latter's death on 18 October 1886. On his death in 1894 he was succeeded in the marquessate, and his other titles, by his uncle. According to family records, he went by the name William and was known informally as Willie.

== Early life ==
Brudenell-Bruce was born on 8 June 1863. In his youth, he attended Eton, but got into trouble, and left the school "under a cloud".

== Career ==
On 1 July 1881 he was commissioned as a Lieutenant in the part-time 3rd (Royal Berkshire Militia) Battalion, Royal Berkshire Regiment, and resigned on 11 April 1886.

=== Gambling problems ===
He became a habitual gambler, forcing his grandfather to step in and pay hundreds of thousands of pounds to satisfy his creditors. In the process of paying off certain creditors, the 3rd Marquess was forced to sell the family's Yorkshire properties to raise the more than £175,000 of debt Willie had amassed. Upon succeeding his grandfather in the family estates, Willie's propensity for gambling only increased, and he soon found his entire estate approaching bankruptcy, amassing another huge round of debts exceeding 230,000 GBP.

During the legal proceedings in 1891, many offers were made to buy the great Savernake estates, including one by Edward Guinness, 1st Earl of Iveagh, then chairman of the board and former CEO of the Guinness Company, to purchase Savernake for £750,000. However, the Board of Trustees of Savernake, headed by Ailesbury's uncle, Lord Henry Brudenell-Bruce, fought hard to prevent Ailesbury from selling. After years of legal battles and appeals, Edward Guinness, by then known as Lord Iveagh, became impatient and withdrew his offer, after a 1 May 1893 deadline was not met. Not long after that, Ailesbury suffered an untimely death, brought about by a sudden illness, and due mainly to his excessive lifestyle.

The April 1888 Vanity Fair caricature of William was originally published with a caption that is quoted, in part: "Lord Ailesbury is at bottom an excellently good creature ... But he can rarely remember not to forget himself."

== Family ==
On 6 May 1884, Willie married the daughter of Thomas Haseley, an actress named Dorothy Julia Haseley, better known to [contemporary] theatre-goers as "Dolly Tester". The marriage produced no children.

Lord Ailesbury died, aged 30, on 10 April 1894 at Leander-road, Brixton, from heart disease. He was succeeded by his uncle, Henry Brudenell-Bruce.

== Notes ==
Peerage of the United Kingdom
Preceded by Ernest Brudenell-Bruce	Marquess of Ailesbury; 1883–1894	Succeeded by Henry Brudenell-Bruce
