= Henry Brudenell-Bruce, 5th Marquess of Ailesbury =

British soldier, businessman and politician

The Most Honourable The Marquess of Ailesbury

Member of Parliament for Chippenham
- In office 1886–1892
- Preceded by: Banister Fletcher
- Succeeded by: The Baron Islington
- Majority: 3,657 (54%)

Personal details
- Born: Henry Augustus Brudenell-Bruce; 11 April 1842
- Died: 10 March 1911 (aged 68)
- Party: Conservative
- Spouse: Georgiana Sophia Maria Pinckney (m. 1870; died 1902)
- Children: 3, including Chandos Brudenell-Bruce, 6th Marquess of Ailesbury
- Parents: Ernest Brudenell-Bruce, 3rd Marquess of Ailesbury; Louisa Elizabeth Horsley-Beresford

Military service
- Allegiance: United Kingdom
- Branch/service: British Army
- Rank: Lieutenant colonel

Henry Augustus Brudenell-Bruce, 5th Marquess of Ailesbury (11 April 1842 – 10 March 1911), styled Lord Henry Brudenell-Bruce from 1878 to 1894, was a British soldier, businessman and Conservative politician.

== Early life ==
Ailesbury was the third son of Ernest Brudenell-Bruce, 3rd Marquess of Ailesbury, and his wife the Hon. Louisa Elizabeth, daughter of John Horsley-Beresford, 2nd Baron Decies. He was educated at Windlesham House School and Eton College.

== Career ==
He served in the British Army and achieved the rank of captain in the 9th Regiment of Foot and lieutenant colonel in the 3rd Battalion of the Duke of Edinburgh's Wiltshire Regiment. Between 1886 and 1892 he sat as Member of Parliament for Chippenham. He was also chairman of Meux & Co, brewers. In 1894 he succeeded to the marquessate on the early death of his nephew and took his seat in the House of Lords.

== Family ==
Lord Ailesbury married, in 1870, Georgiana Sophia Maria Pinckney, daughter of George Henry Pinckney, of Tawstock, Devon. She died in London on 23 June 1902. They had three children, Lady Ernestine Mary Alma Georgiana (6 September 1871 – 18 May 1953), George William James Chandos Brudenell-Bruce, 6th Marquess of Ailesbury (21 May 1873 – 4 August 1961, known as Chandos), and Lady Violet Louisa Marjory (1 March 1880 – 26 August 1923). Lady Marjory married James Binney of Pampisford Hall, Cambridgeshire and had three children, Merlin Brudenell Binney (1908), Olivia Rowena Binney (1910) and Hector Danneskiold Brudenell Binney (1919). Ailesbury remained a widower until his death in March 1911, aged 68. He was succeeded in the marquessate by his son Chandos.

== Notes ==
Parliament of the United Kingdom
Preceded by Banister Fletcher	Member of Parliament for Chippenham; 1886–1892	Succeeded by Sir John Dickson-Poynder, Bt
Peerage of the United Kingdom
Preceded by George Brudenell-Bruce	Marquess of Ailesbury; 1894–1911	Succeeded by Chandos Brudenell-Bruce
