= Savernake Forest =

Forest in Wiltshire, England

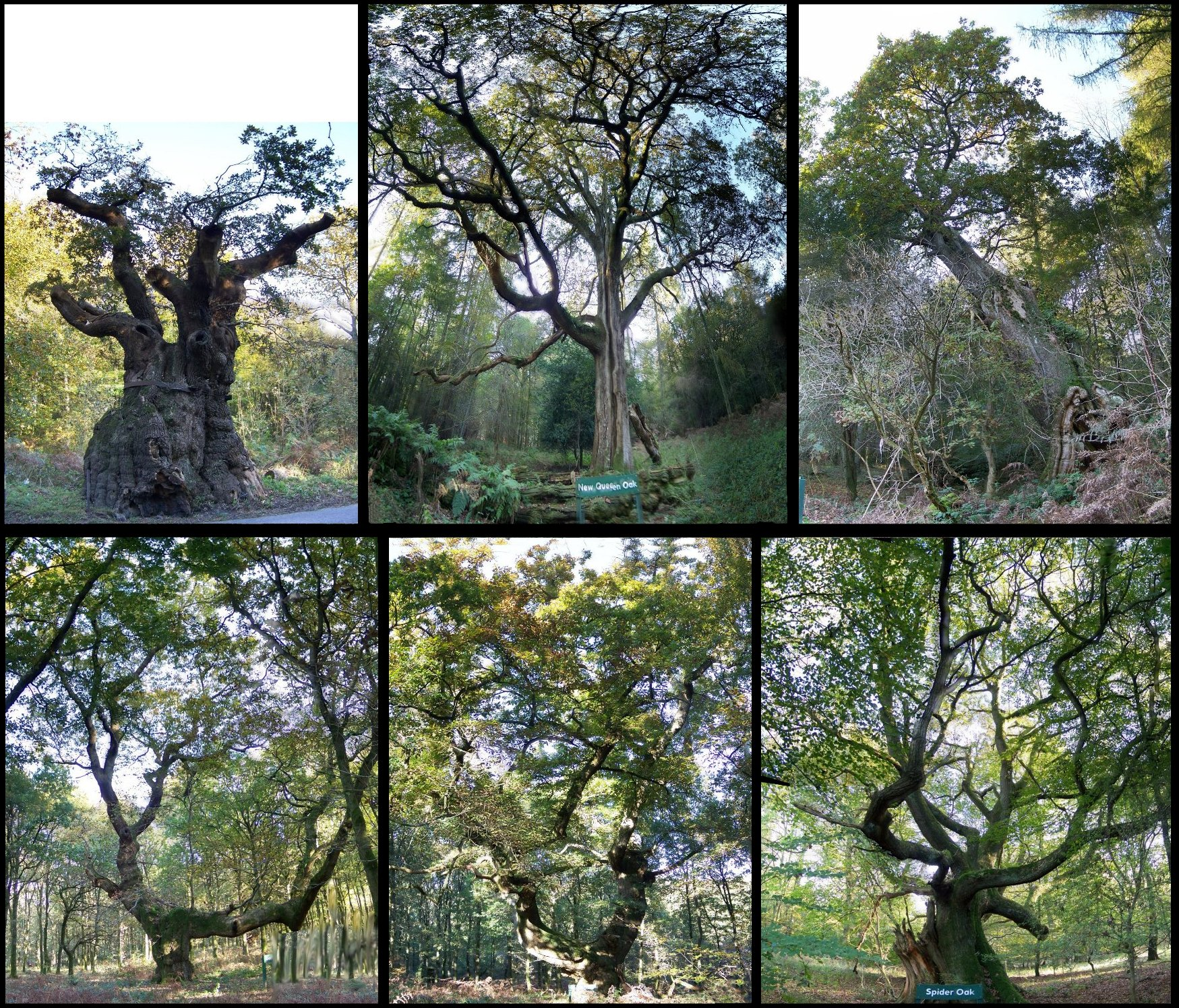
- Six of Savernake Forest's historic oak trees: Top row: Big Belly Oak; New Queen Oak; Queen Oak. Bottom row: Saddle Oak 1; Saddle Oak 2; Spider Oak.
- Interactive map of Savernake Forest

Geography
- Coordinates: 51°23′N 1°41′W
- Area: 4,500 acres (7.0 sq mi; 18 km^{2})

Savernake Forest stands on a Cretaceous chalk plateau between Marlborough and Great Bedwyn in Wiltshire, England. Its area is approximately 4,500 acres (18 km^{2}; 7.0 sq mi).

Most of the forest lies within the civil parish of Savernake. It is privately owned by the Marquess of Ailesbury and his son the Earl of Cardigan, and is administered by trustees. Since 1939 the timber of the forest has been managed by Forestry England on a 999-year lease. The private status of Savernake Forest is maintained by shutting the forest to the public one day per year.

== Geography ==
Savernake's landform is rolling downland, dissected by both dry and wet valleys. The valleys within the forest, of which there are four, are all dry, and the presence of Cretaceous deposits of Clay-with-Flints creates the damp, heavy soils suited to dense cover of oak and beech. There are patches of poor drainage and wet soil.

== History ==
The first mention of a woodland "Safernoc" was made in AD 934 in the written records of King Æthelstan, but the land passed into Norman ownership soon after the Norman Conquest of 1066.

The royal forest established in the 12th century covered an area of some 150 square miles (390 km^{2}); it extended to the villages of East Kennett, Inkpen and the Collingbournes (west, east and south) while the River Kennet formed its northern limit. Savernake Forest was not continuously wooded: Royal forests were a mixture of woodland, copses, common land and rough pasture.

This was the area of land put into the care of Richard Esturmy after the Norman Conquest. Since then Savernake estate and forest has passed down from father to son (or daughter, on four occasions) in an unbroken line of hereditary "forest wardens". In 31 generations, it has never once been bought or sold in a thousand years, and today it is the only ancient forest in Britain still in private hands.

One early high point of the estate's fortunes was in Tudor times. The head of the family (Sir John Seymour) was used to welcoming Henry VIII to the forest, where the king was very keen on deer-hunting. King Henry stayed at Savernake in 1535, where it is believed that his eye was then taken by his host's daughter, Jane Seymour. After the execution of Anne Boleyn in May 1536, they were subsequently married, and Jane was crowned Queen just months later, causing the head of the family at Savernake to suddenly find himself father-in-law to Henry VIII.

Jane died in childbirth and after marrying a further three wives, Henry died ten years later. So it fell to Jane's brother Edward Seymour, 1st Duke of Somerset to leave his estate of Savernake Forest in 1547 and to go up to Hampton Court, where for the next five years with the title 'Lord Protector' he was King of England in all but name, until his late sister's young child Edward VI grew old enough to reign alone.

The mid 17th century to mid 18th century saw variations in the size of the forest. English deer parks were subject to dis-parking whereby sections of forest and parkland were converted to agriculture. (Note: Nevertheless, several private farms had been carved from Savernake Forest in these years, including Levett's Farm (1649), Culley's Farm (1649), and Compton's Farm.(Savernake, A History of the County of Wiltshire, D.A. Crowley, 1999, Victoria County History, British History Online) Levett's Farm was owned by William Levett (sometimes spelled Levet) of Swindon, Wiltshire, a courtier to King Charles I and descendant of a Sussex family.( William Levett, Savernake near Marlborough, A Bibliography of the King's Book, or Eikon Basilike, Edward Almack, 1896) By 1685, Levett's residence was given as "West Lodge, Savernake Parke". (Levett also acted as agent and surveyor for the Duke of Somerset.)(Renewal of lease for ninety nine years or named lives as described in 9/2/282, made by the current owner of the Savernake Estate, William Levett of Swindon, surveyor for the Duke of Somerset. 1 March 1673, Wiltshire and Swindon Archive Catalogue, Wiltshire Council) These three farms, and many more which followed in later years, are shown on a map drawn in 1812. They are situated mainly to the west of the present day forest, at Clench Common. Levett's and Culley's are shown on the O.S. map of 1998, whilst Compton's is possibly marked as "The Old Chapel".) On occasions during this period it was reported that the King's naval officers were far from happy with the state of the forest, finding "but 3 or 4 trees fit for his [the king's] use". The open spaces were found to be "infested with heath, furze, fern [bracken]" and had "coarse turfe".

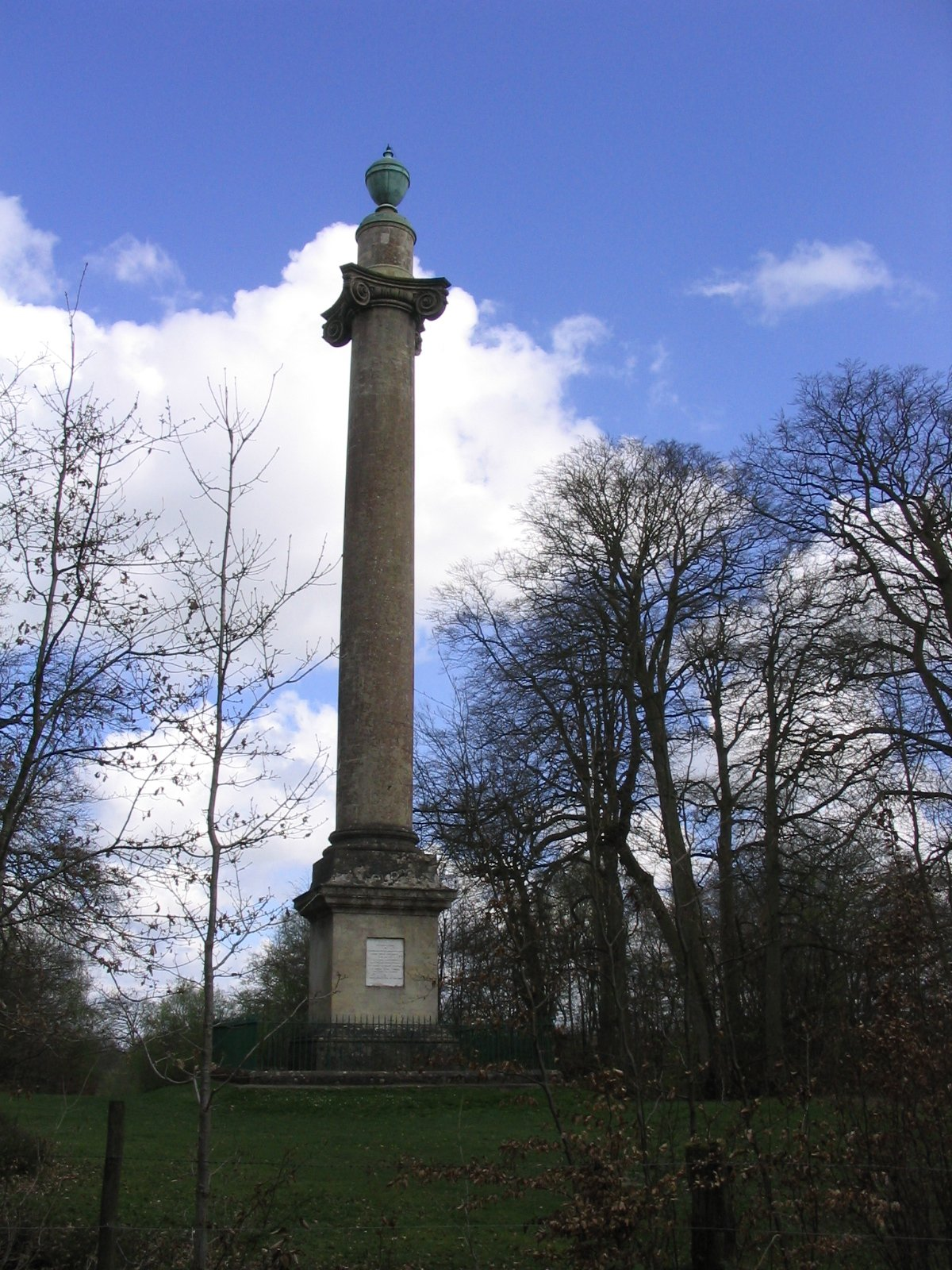
The Ailesbury Column

A second high point for the forest was under the wardenship of Charles Bruce and his nephew Thomas Bruce-Brudenell (wardens from 1741 to 1814). Thomas Bruce, 2nd Earl of Ailesbury, as head of the family, made a great success, and had risen at Court to be Governor to the King George IV. The Bruce Tunnel which carries the Kennet and Avon Canal under the estate is named after him. He employed Lancelot 'Capability' Brown to plant great beech avenues in Savernake Forest, which was then some 40,000 acres (160 km^{2}), nearly ten times its present size. These included the Grand Avenue, running through the heart of the forest, and which at 3.9 miles (6.3 km) dead straight stands in the Guinness Book of Records as the longest tree-lined avenue in Britain.

A stone column some 90 feet (27 m) high was erected by Lord Ailesbury as an impressive viewpoint at the end of a vista from Tottenham House.

Large parts of the forest were used as a munitions depot between 1940 and 1949. Re-planting with conifer plantations was modest by 1950s' standards, and today the Forestry Commission has engaged in a programme more sympathetic to the restoration and preservation of the ancient trees.

David Brudenell-Bruce, 9th Marquess of Ailesbury is the current and thirty-first warden of Savernake Forest, having been handed the wardenship by his father in 1987. Tottenham House, which was designated as Grade I listed in 1966, was sold in 2014.

== Inside the forest ==
The areas of broad-leaved woodland which dominate the Savernake Plateau are accompanied by a farmland mosaic. The plateau is within the North Wessex Downs Area of Outstanding Natural Beauty. The mosaic is emphasised by the assarted character of the area east of the Savernake (coppices of Little Frith, Cobham Frith, Chisbury Wood, Haw Wood, etc.), where farmland occurs as clearings in a wider forest, creating a distinctive and memorable, 'secret' landscape

Capability Brown worked out a strategy for linking coppices with oak plantings, lining forest trails with beech trees, and providing vistas with "proper objects" on which the eye might rest. The forest would be made part of the parkland. The scattered coppices, meadows, scrub, and heath should be united, into "one great whole."

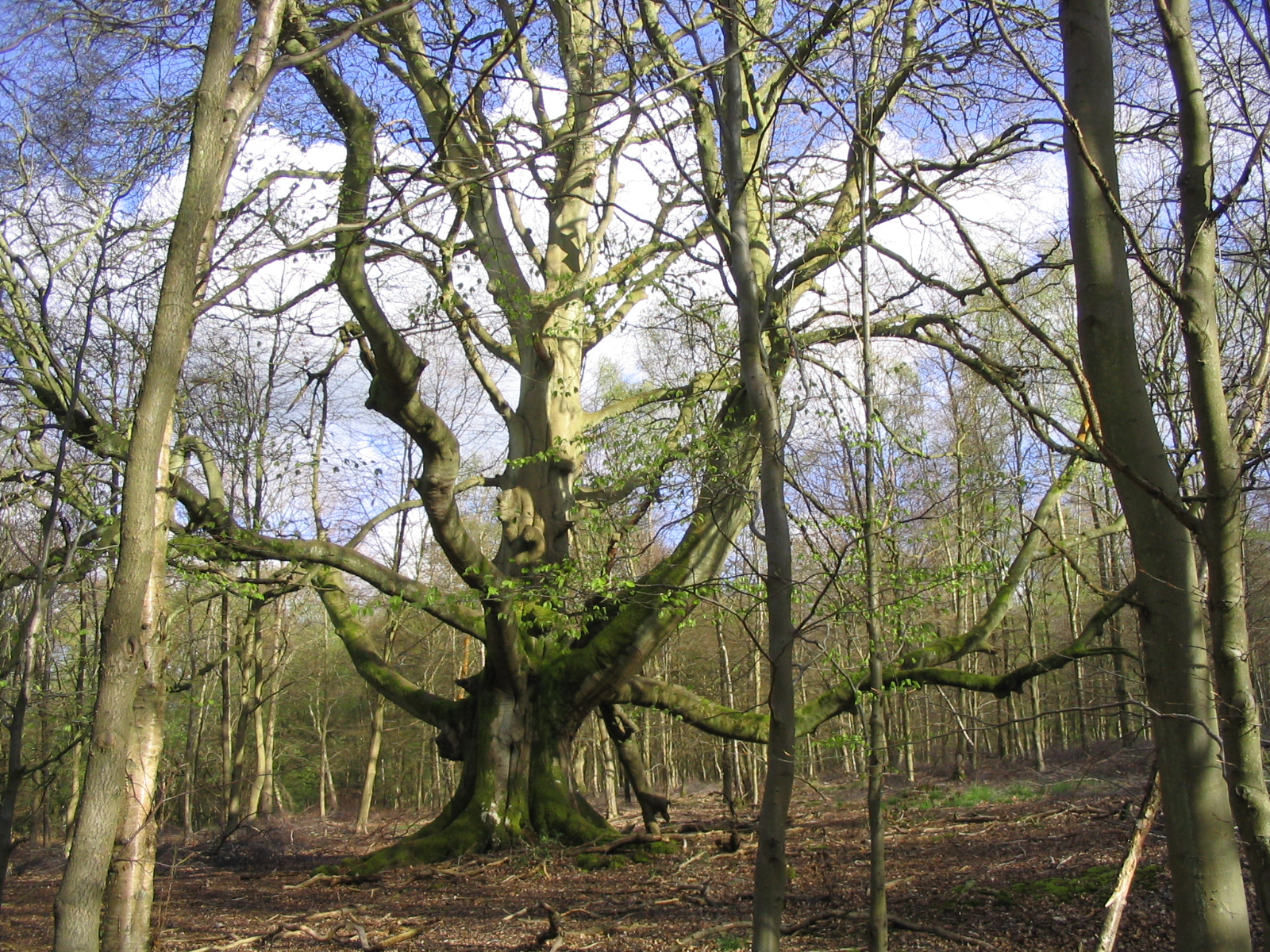
A pollarded beech

As times changed, and social expectations altered, a later warden George Frederick was eager to show off his forest. There was much rearranging of copses and vistas and setting aside of grass rides so that visitors could see the woods as a whole and be impressed. He ordered that the entire estate be fenced and palings be placed around individual trees. That way, the deer might roam freely with a minimum of damage.

The fifth marquess recognized that the woodlands needed to be made commercially viable. Included among the 778,000 trees he planted were a high proportion of softwoods, placed outside the forest's core (e.g.: Birch Copse in the SE). This warden was too deeply imbued with tradition to contemplate industrialized forestry but he was the first of his family to introduce a measure of systematic management of larch and spruce plantations.

Chandos Bruce, the sixth marquess, did everything possible to carry on with this combination of systematic management and concern for amenity and symbolic representation. Eventually, however, he found the burden too heavy due to increasing costs, Lloyd George's taxes on inherited wealth, and the impossibility of hiring enough labour during and after the First World War. In 1930 he approached the government Forestry Commission but drew back when he recognised that surrendering control would probably bring on an invasion by ranks of straight-backed conifers. Eight years later the commission became more open to the suggestion that recreational uses might be as legitimate as commercial ones and agreed to the special conditions the sixth marquess had stubbornly laid down. As a result, after 800 years of wardenship, the family surrendered control and the public, because of Lord Ailesbury's dedication, gained a handsome amenity.

Savernake is a coppice-with-standards forest and an Ancient Woodland. A coppice is a wood where broad-leaved trees, typically hazel, grow out of the stumps or "stools" left from previous cuttings. Standards are trees allowed to grow to maturity. If these trees are allowed to grow in close proximity they grow straight and tall. If they have more room to grow then side branches become substantial.

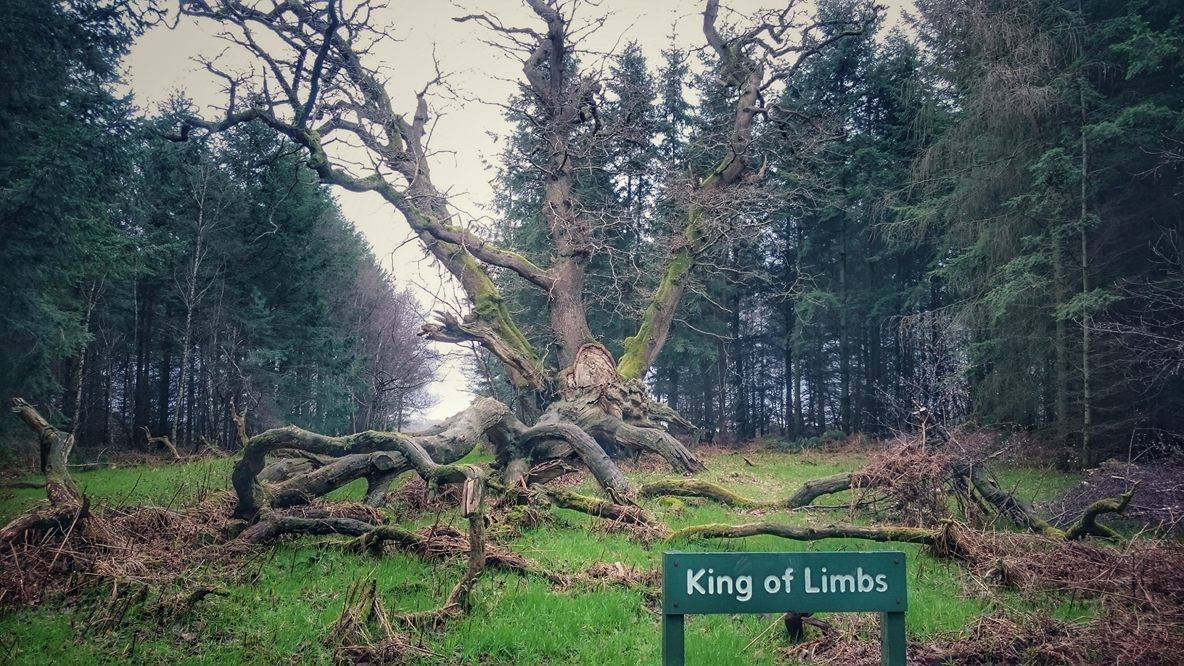
The King of Limbs, an ancient tree

In the past standardisation was not at all essential. Craft work and early mechanical industry, such as shipbuilding, wagon making, and furniture making all required "bends" and "knees," as well as other eccentrically shaped pieces which the side branches would provide. Trees such as beech and oak can be pollarded, a process whereby a standard is cut two-thirds up its trunk. Multiple boughs grow from the cut point and the life of the tree is extended and curved pieces of bough or trunk are often produced. Such trees become magnificent specimens and they live through generations of forest workers. Their base trunk attains great girth. Often the side boughs become too heavy and are broken in stormy weather. In other cases the bough weight (an outward force) begins to tear the lower trunk apart creating a cavity which can over decades become cavernous in size. The oldest of these pollarded trees is the Big Belly Oak beside the A346 road. Big Belly is one of Fifty Great British Trees named and honoured as part of the Queen's Golden Jubilee celebrations. It has a girth of 11 metres (36 ft) and is 1000–1100 years old. In 2001 it was in danger of splitting in two, a fate that had already overtaken the similarly aged Duke's Vaunt. To prevent this, the tree was fitted with a metal corset. The 2011 Radiohead album The King of Limbs is named after the ancient King of Limbs tree in the forest near Tottenham House, where the band recorded part of their previous album, In Rainbows.

It is thought that nowhere else in Europe is there such a concentration of "veteran" trees. Savernake has hundreds of such trees, beeches and oaks, some appearing singly, others in avenues, some amongst younger broad-leaved trees and others within coniferous plantations. Some of the historically important trees are named and their names appear upon local maps, and even upon the modern Ordnance Survey Explorer 157. Since about 2006 the Forestry Commission has been clearing space around well-known venerable trees, and naming them with green plaques. Elsewhere clearings have been created, revealing old ponds, long hidden by coniferous plantings but now opened up to the light. Standing water is essential for bio-diversity. Savernake has areas of damp soil, but no streams. Another best practice is to leave dead wood lying, for the benefit of invertebrates. In Savernake fallen trees are left to decay and dead standing trees (monoliths) are generally left standing.

In 2003 White Park cattle were introduced into Savernake Forest, to forage freely in the Red Vein Bottom area, a semi-open area of relict wood pasture which had not been grazed in more than 60 years. Such controlled grazing should recreate the naturally open glades ideal for the ancient oak and beech and their specialist lichen and fungal communities, as well as rare woodland and grassland flora; the exact wildlife features for which Savernake Forest is designated as a Site of Special Scientific Interest.

Sites of Special Scientific Interest (SSSIs) are regularly inspected and their health is monitored. Savernake has SSSI status primarily for rare lichens found on the bark of the older trees. There is also good representation of fungi types and mosses. However, the health of Savernake is not particularly good, partly because of the destruction wrought during World War II, and probably from wind-borne pollutants. The entire site is at condition 88% "unfavourable recovering". This is not a comment of the beauty of the forest, but a health statement on the lichens and mosses and invertebrates.

== Forest features ==
Savernake Forest has many named drives and other landscape features. These are named on the Ordnance Survey Explorer map 157 Marlborough & Savernake Forest, but few are named on the ground.

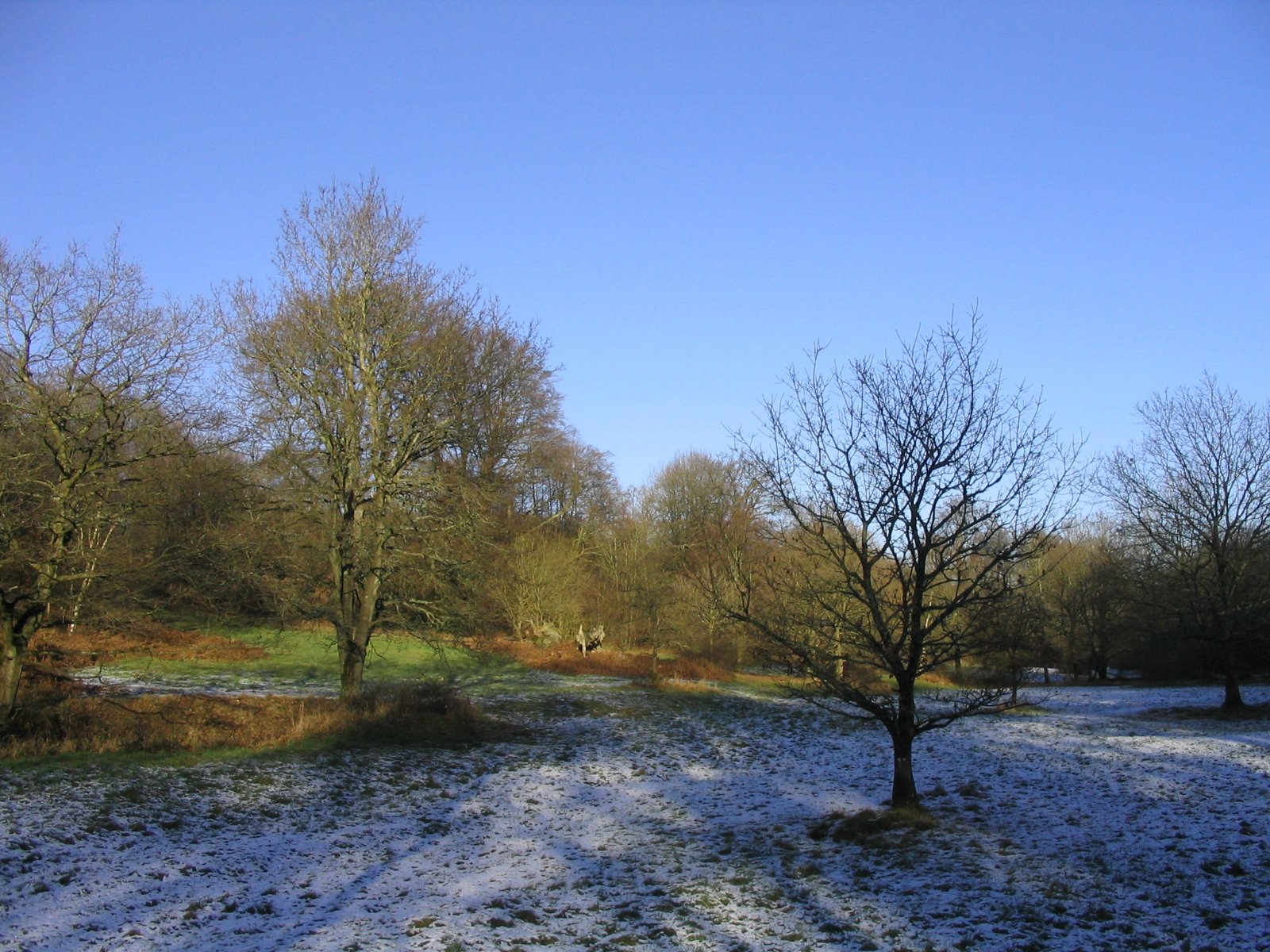
Winter scene at Great Lodge Bottom

=== Postern Hill to Amity Oak ===
(About 3 miles (4.8 km) west to east) Postern Hill is at (grid reference SU197679). At 193 metres (633 ft) this is the chalk plateau at its highest, and a north-facing scarp slope overlooks the town of Marlborough. On the hilltop is a small Forestry Commission Camp Site – Postern Hill Campsite – together with a public car park and barbecue area. Four tracks head southwards through oak forest, the principal one being Long Harry (grid reference SU202681). The track descends gradually, crossing White Road (grid reference SU206677). Tree cover is not dense and ancient oaks are plentiful here, including one named Saddle Oak on account of its near-horizontal boughs.

Church Walk (grid reference SU209675) bridle path is crossed next before reaching Great Lodge Bottom (grid reference SU215673). The bridle path connects the A4 to Cadley hamlet on the A346, and is the only public right of way in the main part of the forest. Great Lodge Bottom is an east-running dry valley, fairly open with hawthorn and blackthorn scrub. After crossing the Grand Avenue the valley runs into Red Vein Bottom (grid reference SU219676) with its rough pasture and rabbit warrens. The path is joined by a small valley coming down from the pinetum (pine arboretum) at Braydon Hook (grid reference SU221671) adjacent to Braydon Hook House. The path from Red Vein Bottom skirts the Ashdale Firs and passes some huge beeches before arriving at the Amity Oak (grid reference SU232675), an old tree which serves as a parish boundary marker. The valley continues east to Hungerford via Little Frith.

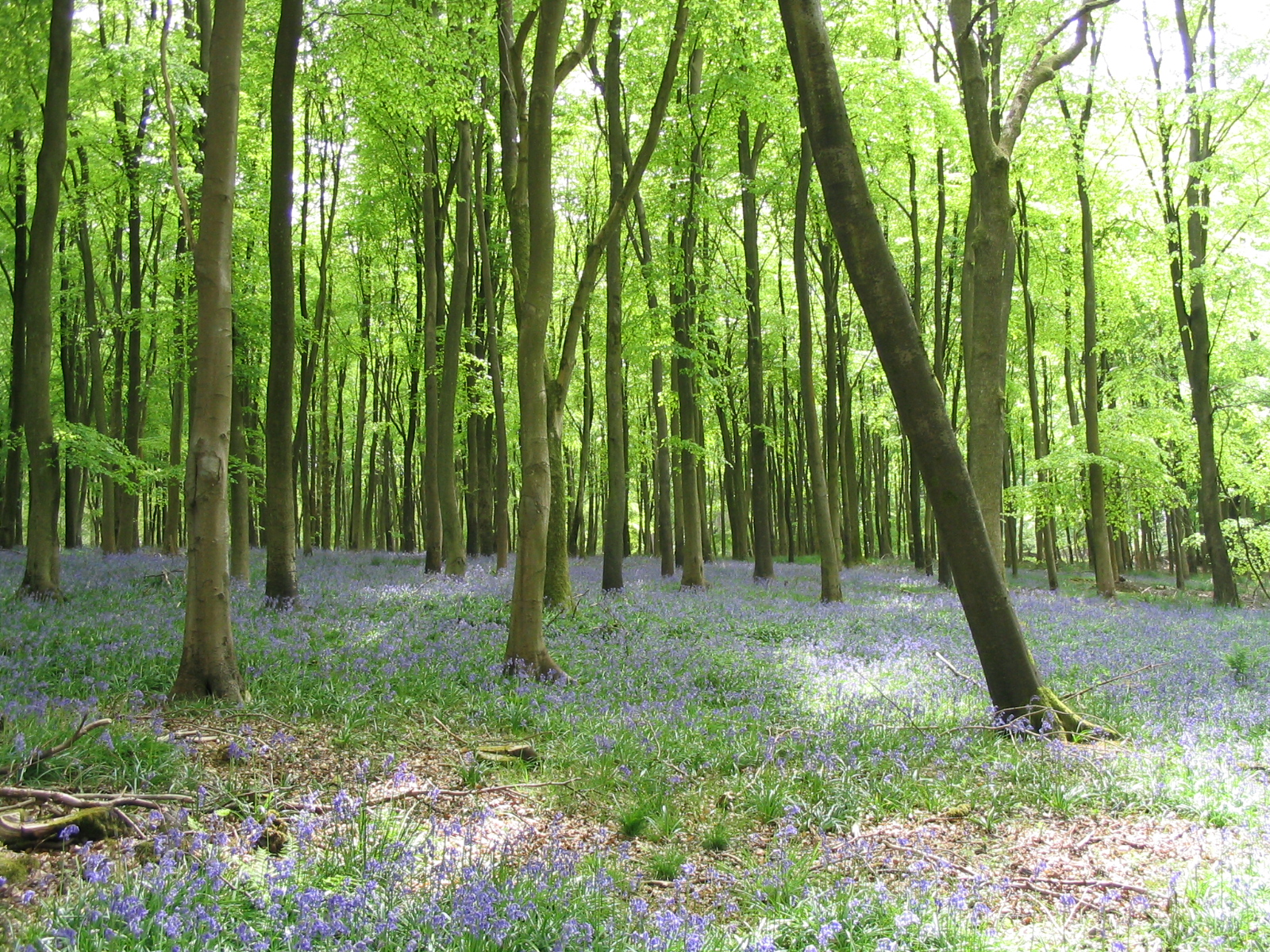
Bluebells at Little Frith

=== Leigh Hill to Crabtree Cottages ===
(About 3 miles (4.8 km) west to east) Leigh Hill (grid reference SU219645) is 2.8 miles (4.5 km) south of Postern Hill and is 193 metres (633 ft) high.

There is a seasonal car park nearby. Three small valleys run northeast from this high point. Postwives Walk (grid reference SU220647) begins with an ancient avenue of oaks and descends gently to cross Charcoal Burners Road (grid reference SU222654) (charcoal is still made here) and so on to the heart of the forest, passing both the Queen Oak (grid reference SU224657) and the King Oak (grid reference SU225659). A second valley, named Cheval Bottom, (grid reference SU225645) starts in an avenue of mature copper beeches and passes beside the Park Pale (grid reference SU229660) which is an ancient bank-and-ditch feature which marked the perimeter of the Royal Park at one time. The third valley starts near the column at Three Oak Hill Drive (grid reference SU231662) which, despite its name, has fine stands of beech and also of Scots pine. The ground descends into Drury Lane (grid reference SU229648) and passes a young plantation before joining the other two valleys and then, as a fine shallow-sided valley of meadow pasture, passes Savernake Lodge (grid reference SU233667) on its way to Crabtree Cottages (grid reference SU240670) and thence to Little Frith (grid reference SU246676) with its carpets of bluebells in May, and then finally joining the valley to Hungerford.

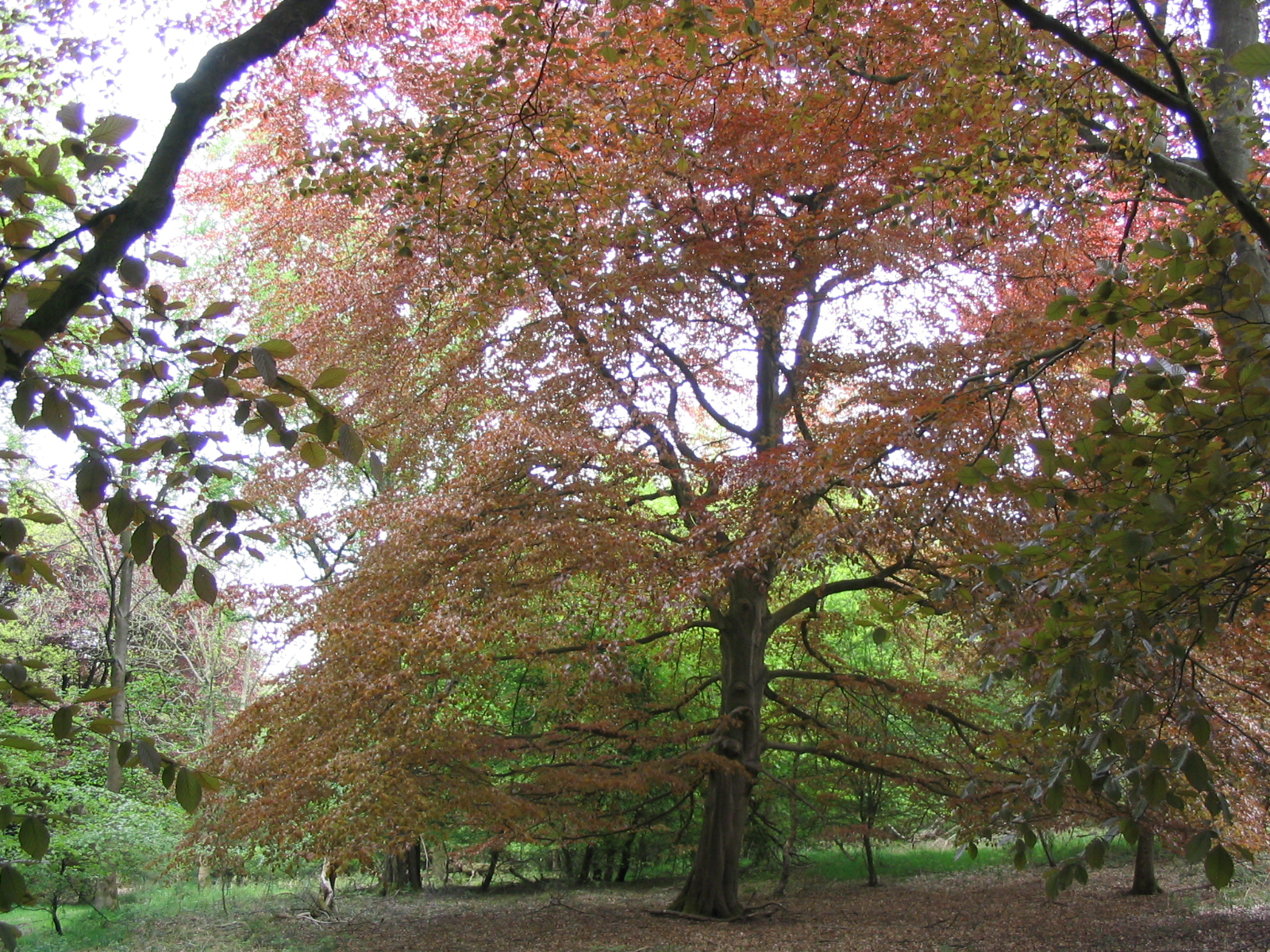
An avenue of copper beeches

=== Grand Avenue to Strawgrove Copse ===
(About 5 3/4 miles (9.3 km) north to south.) The Grand Avenue (grid reference SU210683) is a straight but narrow tarmaced road connecting the A4 to the Durley Road near Tottenham House. It is lined with beech trees, but few of them are survivors from the original plantings. The A4 was once a toll road through the forest, taking the Marlborough to Hungerford traffic. The Toll Road House (grid reference SU209684) still stands today. The Grand Avenue continues southeast to Eight Walks (grid reference SU225668) where Capability Brown laid out the hub to Savernake's eight radial drives. A little further on there is an unexplained Monument (grid reference SU231662) on the western side of the road, rumoured to be a marker (or tomb?) to someone who suffered a fatal fall from a horse.

At the Three Oak Hill Drive crossroads, a track north-east points to Birch Copse (grid reference SU239662). Duke's Vaunt Oak (grid reference SU238664) is a notable tree approximately 1,000 years old. It was once hollow and 30 feet (9.1 m) in girth. In 1760 it had a door and a lock and was capable of sheltering "twenty boys". (Note: The Duke's Vaunt was surrounded by a new planting of conifers in the 1980s. In 2007 more than 30 of these firs were cut down as part of the "haloing" process for the oldest of Savernake's trees. Haloing means taking out encroaching trees and undergrowth that might rob the old trees of the light and air they need.(From Forestry Commission press release 27-6-2007 "Can't see the trees for the wood" Archived 2011-06-06 at the Wayback Machine)) The tree is badly split now, but survives. Here the ground is damp and parts of Birch Copse barely see daylight. While some of the tall pines seem senescent, other plantation firs are green and vibrant. Many varieties of fungi can be seen in profusion in October, but dead-wood fungi are common enough throughout the year. At the southeast edge of the forest are good examples of Sweet Chestnut and Yew. At Holt Pound (grid reference SU248657) an avenue of oaks joins Birch Copse to Bedwyn Common (grid reference SU255652). This section of Savernake has its own avenue, London Ride, which at 1 1/3 miles (2.1 km) runs from St Katherine's Church (grid reference SU252649) to Upper Horsehall Hill Farm (grid reference SU261667). The ride is lined with oak in the south, and by limes in the north. Many old oaks and old sweet chestnuts are still standing, and foxgloves populate the forest edges. Forest tracks and bridleways lead southeast, and this is very much assarted (Note: Assarted woodland: in general, woods were deemed to be assarted if their outline is sufficiently irregular. This is most evident where they are adjoined by assart field systems. Assarts are fields cut out of woodland and are identified as enclosures of very irregular form with wavy boundaries.(Taylor, Christopher (1982) [1975]. Fields in the English Landscape. Archaeology in the Field Series. London: J.M. Dent & Sons Ltd. pp. 75, 97. ISBN 0-460-02232-6.)) countryside. When Stock Common (grid reference SU262644) is reached there are footpaths to Shawgrove Copse (grid reference SU270643), within sight of Great Bedwyn, or south to the rear of Tottenham Park by way of Bloxham Lodge (grid reference SU262637).

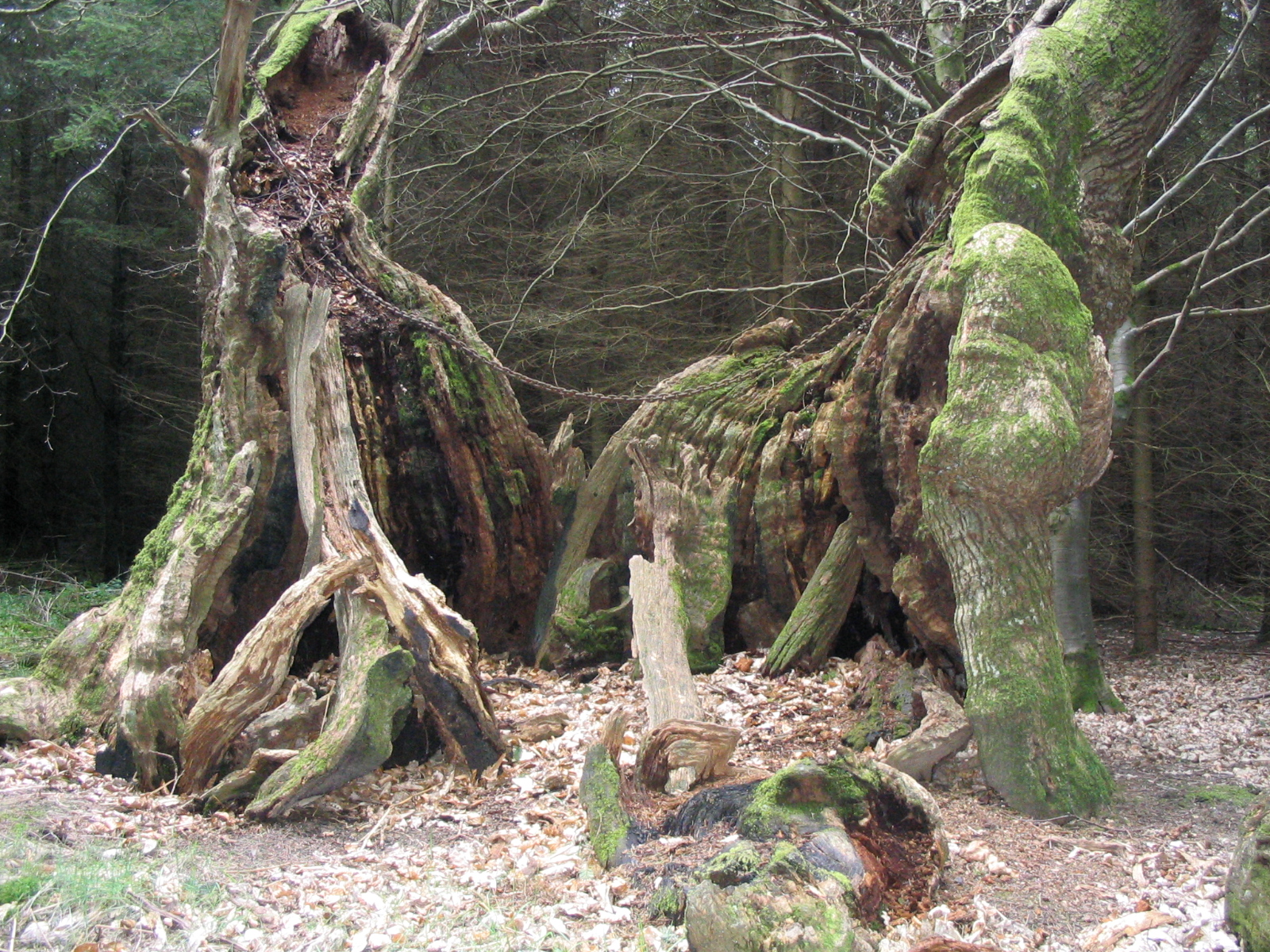
The Duke's Vaunt oak in 2004

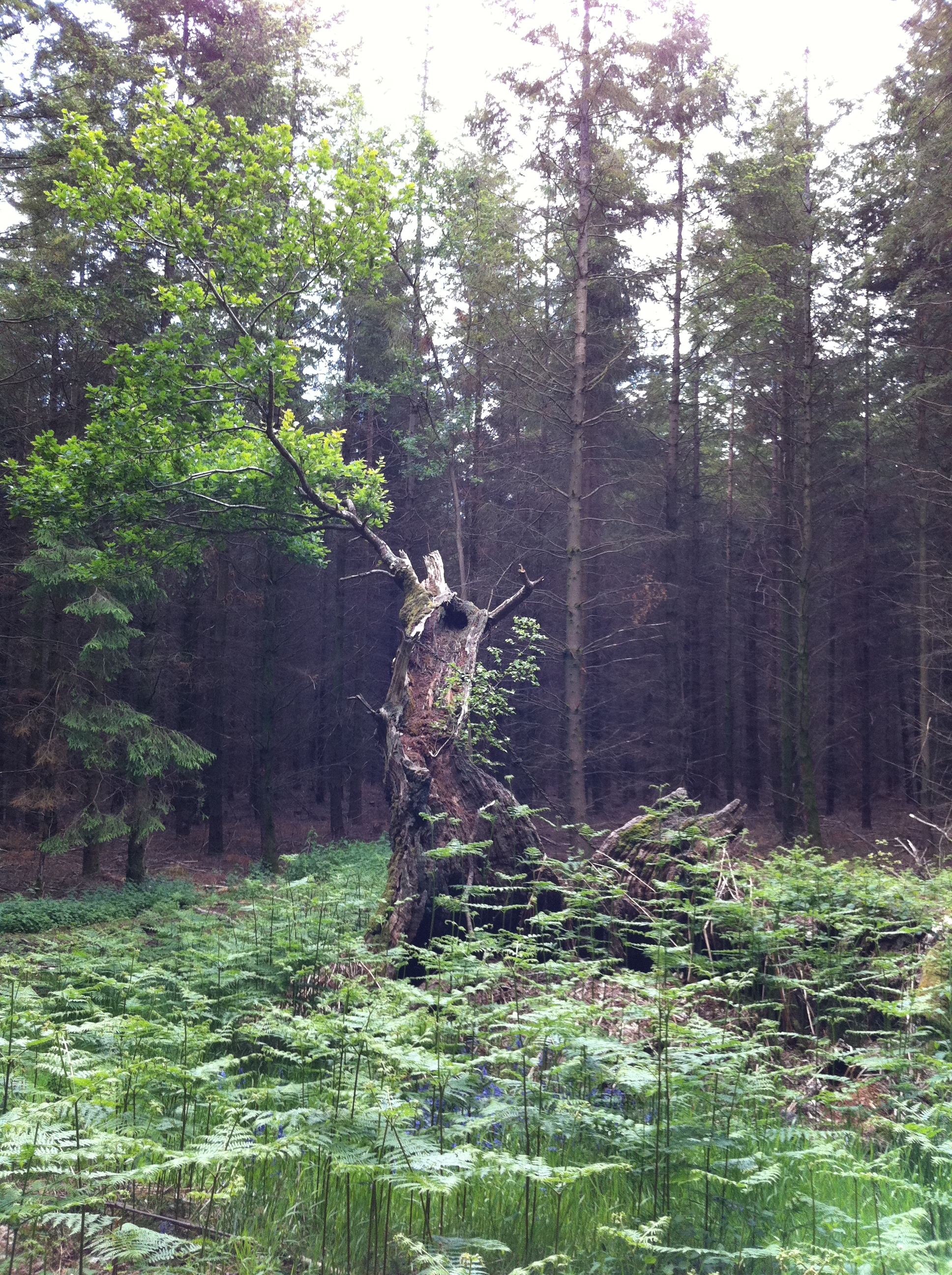
The Duke's Vaunt oak in 2011

== See also ==
- Savernake Horn

== Nearby places ==
- Marlborough
- Cadley
- Burbage and Durley
- Chisbury
- Great Bedwyn
- Little Bedwyn
- West Woods (grid reference SU164667)
- Collingbourne Woods (grid reference SU272527)
- Pewsey
- Wootton Rivers
- Easton Royal
- Wolfhall
