= David Brudenell-Bruce, 9th Marquess of Ailesbury =

British peer (born 1952)

The Most Honourable The Marquess of Ailesbury
- Born: David Michael James Brudenell-Bruce; 12 November 1952 (age 73)
- Spouses: Rosamond Winkley (m. 1980; div. 2009); Catherine Joanne Powell (m. 2011)
- Issue: 3, including Catherine
- Parents: Michael Brudenell-Bruce; Edwina Sylvia de Winton Wills

David Michael James Brudenell-Bruce, 9th Marquess of Ailesbury (born 12 November 1952), styled The Hon. David Brudenell-Bruce until 1974 and Earl of Cardigan between 1974 and 2024, is a British peer.

== Biography ==
=== Early life ===
David Brudenell-Bruce is the son of Michael Brudenell-Bruce, 8th Marquess of Ailesbury, and Edwina Sylvia de Winton Wills of W.D. & H.O. Wills. His parents divorced when he was six years old and he attended Hawtreys prep-school, Eton College, Rannoch School, and the Royal Agricultural College, Cirencester.

As his father declined to take the courtesy title of Earl of Cardigan when he became heir-apparent to the Marquessate in 1961, young Brudenell-Bruce was never styled Viscount Savernake (the usual title of the second heir); but he assumed the courtesy earldom when his father became Marquess in 1974.

=== Career ===
Brudenell-Bruce has been Secretary of Marlborough Conservatives since 1985, and has been a member of the Executive of the Devizes Constituency Conservative Association since 1988.

Since 1987, he has been the 31st Hereditary Warden of Savernake Forest, a privately owned forest in Wiltshire. The Savernake Estate has not been sold in almost 1,000 years, and the family are descended from the Seymour family, with Jane Seymour being the 3rd wife of King Henry VIII, and the only wife to bear the King a son, King Edward VI.

In 2005, his family trust granted a commercial lease to a US-based hotel corporation to turn his ancestral home, Tottenham House, into a luxury golf resort. The American company failed to pay its rent in the recession, and ceased trading. The Earl was then in dispute with the trustees of the Savernake Estate over their management and disposal of its assets. In July 2011, it was reported that the estate was in severe financial difficulties. In August 2011, the Earl was involved in a dispute with the Savernake estate's trustees over his plans to sell some of the family silver, and again in March 2012 over their plans to sell some of the family paintings. In 2014 the Earl took court proceedings against the trustees, claiming that they had paid themselves excessive remuneration. The High Court agreed, concluding that the trustees had failed in part of their duties, and that Mr Moore had paid himself remuneration to which he was not entitled; Mr Moore was ordered to reimburse over £100,000 and the trustees were made to pay £64,225 to the trust as compensation for loss of rent.

In separate 2014 proceedings, the Court of Appeal upheld the trustees' decision to sell Tottenham House to an unnamed buyer for £11.25m. By 2013, the earl's financial affairs at his Trustees' hands had suffered to the extent that he was claiming Jobseeker's Allowance whilst training to be a HGV lorry driver. In 2017 he was able to remove both trustees from office, and restore his family income.

=== Battle of the Beanfield ===
The Marquess of Ailesbury witnessed the Battle of the Beanfield, a notorious incident in 1985 in which Wiltshire Police were accused of brutalising a convoy of travellers on land near Stonehenge, making over 300 arrests, said to be the biggest arrest of civilians in the United Kingdom in 100 years. Largely as a result of his testimony, police charges against members of the convoy were rejected in the Crown Court. In relation to this several national newspapers criticised him and questioned his suitability as a witness. He successfully sued these papers for claiming that he made false statements and that he was providing accommodation for the New Age Travellers. Lord Cardigan later said:

I hadn't realised that anybody that appeared to be supporting elements that stood against the establishment would be savaged by establishment newspapers. Now one thinks about it, nothing could be more natural. I hadn't realised that I would be considered a class traitor. If I see a policeman repeatedly truncheoning a very pregnant woman over the head from behind (as I did) I do feel I'm entitled to say "that's a terrible thing you're doing, Officer". I went along, saw a dreadful episode in British Police history, and simply reported what I saw.

=== Personal life ===
By his first marriage to Rosamond Winkley (died 2012), he had his first two children, Thomas James Brudenell-Bruce, Earl of Cardigan (born 11 February 1982), and Lady Catherine Anna Brudenell-Bruce (born 25 November 1984).

After his divorce, he married in 2011 Catherine Joanne Powell, of Flagstaff, Arizona, now Marchioness of Ailesbury. In 2013 his wife gave birth to a daughter.

On 12 May 2024, he succeeded his father as 9th Marquess upon his death.

Peerage of the United Kingdom
Preceded by Michael Sydney Cedric Brudenell-Bruce	Marquess of Ailesbury; 2024–present	Succeeded by Incumbent
Orders of precedence in the United Kingdom
Preceded by The Most Hon. The Marquess; Conyngham	Gentlemen; The Most Hon. The Marquess of Ailesbury	Succeeded by The Most Hon. The Marquess of Bristol
