= Broomhall House =

18th-century building in Fife, Scotland

Coordinates: 56.03715°N 3.48325°W

Broomhall House is the family seat of the Earls of Elgin, three miles (4.8 kilometres) south-west of Dunfermline, sitting above the village of Limekilns and near the village of Charlestown, in Fife, Scotland. The building was designated as a Category A listed building in 1971.

== The house ==
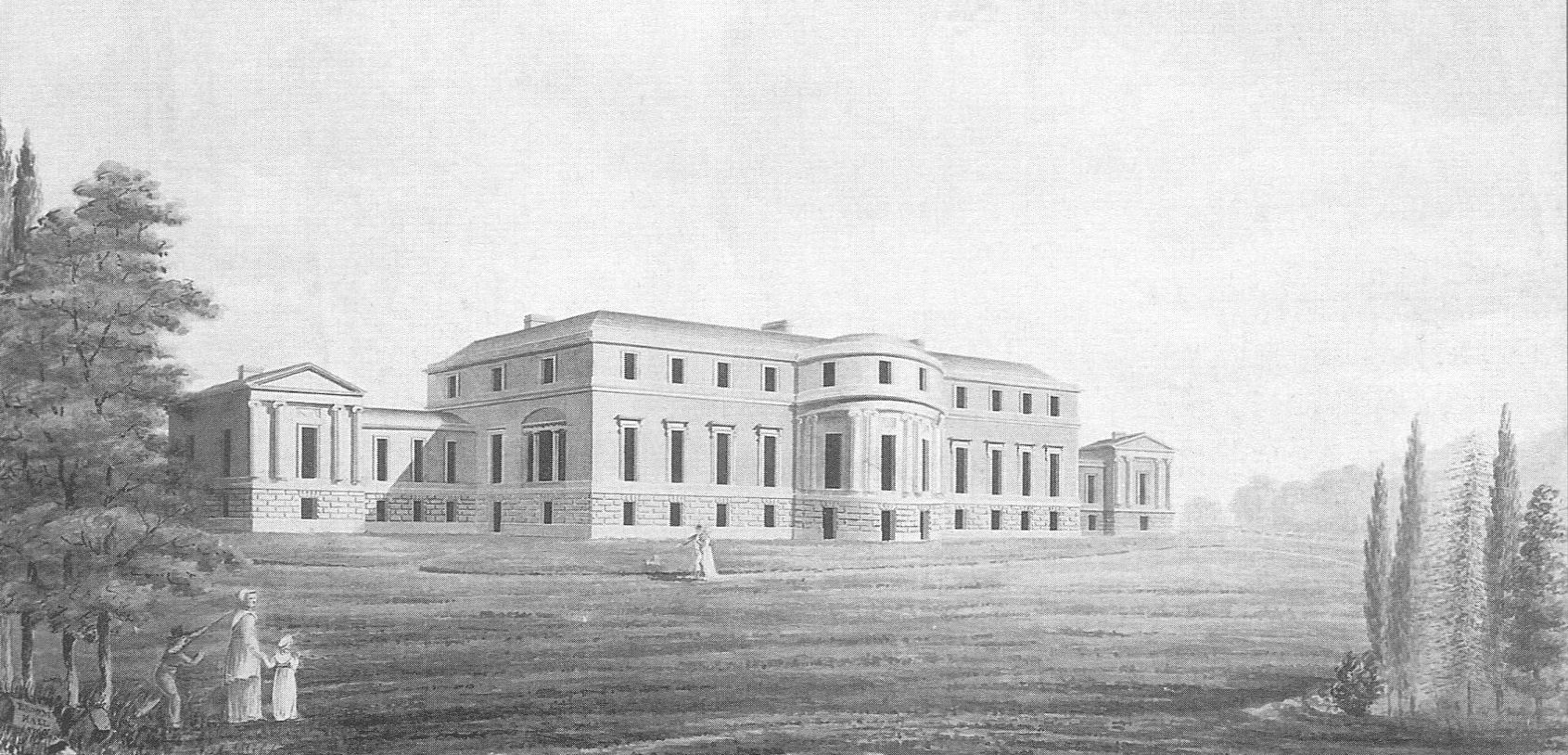
Broomhall House: the South Front. Believed to be a presentation drawing by Thomas Harrison. The main facade, with its semi-circular bay, is essentially as built, but the wings were never completed to Harrison's designs.

The house has a complex building history. First built in 1702 to designs by Sir William Bruce, it was remodelled in 1766 by John Adam, brother of Robert Adam, although there is debate about the extent of these alterations. In 1796, a further more extensive redesign was undertaken by Thomas Harrison (1744–1829), the Yorkshire-born architect noted for working in the Grecian manner. This essentially extended and re-faced the façades, creating a rectangular block 11 bays by 3 wide bays, although there are differing opinions on quite what was achieved by Harrison's designs. Part of the Harrison design, a semi-circular bay on the south front is decorated with three Coade Stone panels depicting reclining figures.

Harrison was an important architect in north west England, being based in Lancaster then Chester. His life is described in Champness's Thomas Harrison. He was perhaps underrated nationally, as his work was almost entirely confined to the North and Scotland. Much of his work was in public commissions, but he designed and altered several country houses. Broomhall was his third country house commission in Scotland, after work at Gosford then the design and build of Kennet House (demolished 1967). Colvin describes Broomhall as Harrison's most notable country house.

The house at this point was intended to display the Elgin Marbles from the Parthenon, a portion of these having been removed by the 7th Earl of Elgin and 11th Earl of Kincardine from 1801 on, mostly shipped in 1804 but some not finally reaching Britain until 1812. However, the building was not completed to Harrison's designs and there followed a long period where numerous architects submitted designs to finish the house.

The 7th Earl, over some 30 years, commissioned 14 architects to produce plans, especially for the completion of the north front entrance porch. For example, a massive columned portico designed by Sir Robert Smirke was made 1808 to 1810 but never installed and became the entrance to the Perth Sheriff Court in 1819. The north front was finally completed with the addition of a three bay porch in 1865–66 to a design by Charles Heath Wilson, the low east and west wings in their present form not until 1874. As well, various internal alterations were made throughout the 19th century.

The 7th Earl died in 1841 and while the house was not completed to his grand designs, it is nevertheless a substantial and important building, Country Life describing it as “A stupendous country house". It is a Scottish Category A listed building. It has a fine if restrained interior in the Greek Revival style, with major collections of furniture and paintings, many collected by the 7th Earl, including some fragments of the Elgin Marbles and plaster casts of others.

== See also ==
- Clan Bruce
- Pera House
