= Michael Brudenell-Bruce, 8th Marquess of Ailesbury =

British peer (1926–2024)

The Most Honourable The Marquess of Ailesbury
- Born: 31 March 1926; Marlborough, Wiltshire, England
- Died: 12 May 2024 (aged 98); London
- Education: Eton College
- Occupations: Officer; stockbroker
- Spouses: Edwina Sylvia de Winton-Wills (m. 1952; div. 1961); Juliet Adrienne Lethbridge Kingsford (m. 1963; div. 1974); Caroline Elizabeth Wethered (m. 1974; div. 1992)
- Partner: Teresa Marshall de Paoli
- Children: 5, including David
- Parents: Cedric Brudenell-Bruce; Joan Houlton Salter
- Military career
- Allegiance: United Kingdom
- Branch: British Army
- Service years: 1945–1959
- Rank: Captain
- Unit: Royal Horse Guards

Michael Sydney Cedric Brudenell-Bruce, 8th Marquess of Ailesbury (31 March 1926 – 12 May 2024), styled Viscount Savernake until 1974, was a British peer.

Although since the death of James Brudenell, 7th Earl of Cardigan that Earldom has been the senior subsidiary title of the Marquesses of Ailesbury, the future 8th Marquess did not take it on the death of his grandfather the 6th Marquess in 1961 and remained known as Viscount Savernake, as he had been since birth.

== Biography ==
The Marquess was born on 31 March 1926, the son of Cedric Brudenell-Bruce, 7th Marquess of Ailesbury. He attended Eton College before serving in the Royal Horse Guards. He received an emergency commission as a second lieutenant on 12 August 1945, three weeks before the end of the Second World War. He was promoted to lieutenant on 1 September 1946, and entered the reserves with the same rank on 1 September 1949, with the honorary rank of captain. He relinquished his reserve commission on 1 July 1959, retaining the honorary rank of captain.

In 1954, he became a member of the London Stock Exchange. He joined the stockbrokers Bragg, Stockdale, Hall & Co, founded by John Bragg in 1824, in the City of London, which merged with Fiske & Co in 1975; he became a partner of Fiske. He became a director of Fiske & Co when it became a limited company, and remained so when it went public as Fiske plc.

On 15 July 1974, he succeeded his father as 8th Marquess and then took up his hereditary seat in the House of Lords as a crossbencher. He was among the 667 hereditary peers who lost the right to sit in the Lords in the 1999 reforms.

The family seat was Tottenham House, in Savernake Forest, Wiltshire, but they ceased to live there in 1946 when it became Hawtreys school. Professing no interest in rural affairs, he handed over the wardenship of Savernake Forest to his son and heir, David, in 1987. The Marquess owned Avebury Manor, also in Wiltshire, from 1976 to 1981.

=== Death ===
On 12 May 2024, the 8th Marquess of Ailesbury died after falling from a window at his home in the Shepherd's Bush area of London, at the age of 98. His partner told police that he had been attempting to let his cat out when he accidentally fell, but some family members publicly disputed this, pending an inquest. In March 2025, the coroner concluded that he had taken his own life.

== Marriages and issue ==
The Marquess was married three times. His first wife, Edwina de Winton-Wills (1933–2023), was the daughter of Lt. Col. Sir Ernest Edward de Winton-Wills, 4th Baronet Wills of Hazelwood, of the W.D. & H.O. Wills tobacco company, and his wife Sylvia Ogden. They were married in 1952 and divorced in 1961. They had three children, including David Brudenell-Bruce, 9th Marquess of Ailesbury (born 1952). In 1963, the Marquess married a second time, to Juliet Kingsford. The couple divorced in 1974 after having two children. In 1974, shortly after his second divorce, he married for the third time, to Caroline Wethered. They had no children, and divorced in 1992. At the time of his death, he had lived with Teresa Marshall de Paoli for over 30 years.

== Sources ==
- 'AILESBURY', Who Was Who, A & C Black, 1920–2007; online edn, Oxford University Press, Dec 2007

Peerage of the United Kingdom
| Preceded by Cedric Brudenell-Bruce | Marquess of Ailesbury; 1974–2024 | Succeeded by David Brudenell-Bruce |
