= Earl of Cardigan =

Title in the Peerage of England

Earldom of Cardigan
- Arms of Brudenell, Earl of Cardigan: Argent, a chevron gules between three morions azure
- Creation date: 20 April 1661
- Created by: Charles II
- Peerage: Peerage of England
- First holder: Thomas Brudenell, 1st Baron Brudenell
- Present holder: David Brudenell-Bruce, 9th Marquess of Ailesbury
- Heir apparent: Thomas Brudenell-Bruce (styled as Earl of Cardigan as a courtesy title)
- Remainder to: the male heirs of the body lawfully begotten
- Subsidiary titles: Baron Brudenell, of Stanton Wyvill in the County of Leicester
- Former seats: Tottenham House; Deene Park

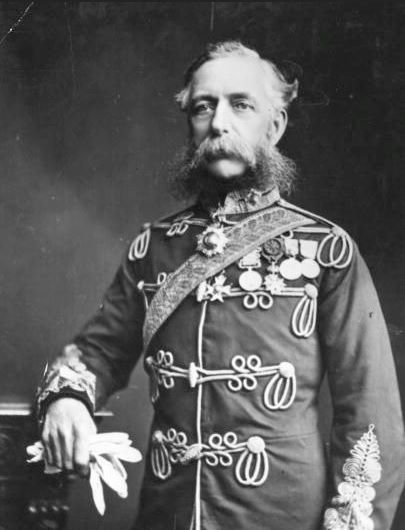
James Brudenell, 7th Earl of Cardigan

Earl of Cardigan is a title in the Peerage of England that was created by Charles II in 1661 for Thomas Brudenell, 1st Baron Brudenell, and the title has been held since 1868 by the Marquesses of Ailesbury. Since that time, it has been used as a courtesy title by the heir apparent to that Marquessate, currently Thomas Brudenell-Bruce, Earl of Cardigan, only son of the 9th Marquess.

== History ==
The Brudenell family descends from Sir Robert Brudenell, Chief Justice of the Common Pleas from 1520 to 1530. His great-grandson, Sir Thomas Brudenell, was created a Baronet in the Baronetage of England, styled "of Deene in the County of Northampton", on 29 June 1611. On 26 February 1628, he was raised to the Peerage of England as Baron Brudenell, of Stanton Wyvill in the County of Leicester. On 20 April 1661, he was further honoured when he was made Earl of Cardigan, also in the Peerage of England. On his death, the titles passed to his son, Robert, the 2nd Earl, and on the 2nd Earl's death to his grandson, George, the 3rd Earl, the 2nd Earl's only son, Francis, Lord Brudenell, having predeceased his father.

The 3rd Earl's eldest son, George, the 4th Earl, married Lady Mary Montagu, daughter of John Montagu, 2nd Duke of Montagu, and he succeeded to the Montagu estates on his father-in-law's death in 1749, including the Lordship of Bowland. He assumed the same year by Royal licence the surname of Montagu in lieu of Brudenell. In 1766, he was created Marquess of Monthermer and Duke of Montagu in the Peerage of Great Britain, revivals of the titles which had become extinct on his father-in-law's death in 1749. Montagu's only son and heir, John Montagu, Marquess of Monthermer, had already been created Baron Montagu, of Boughton in the County of Northampton, in the Peerage of Great Britain in 1762, a revival of another title held by his maternal grandfather. However, Lord Monthermer died childless in 1770, predeceasing his father. The barony of Montagu died with him. In 1786, the Duke of Montagu was also created Baron Montagu, of Boughton in the County of Northampton, in the Peerage of Great Britain, with remainder to the younger sons of his daughter, Lady Elizabeth Montagu, wife of Henry Scott, 3rd Duke of Buccleuch. On the Duke's death in 1780, the marquessate and dukedom became extinct while he was succeeded in the barony of Montagu according to the special remainder by his grandson, Henry Scott (see Baron Montagu of Boughton for further history of this title; see also Duke of Montagu).

The earldom, barony of Brudenell and baronetcy passed to the Duke's younger brother, James, the 5th Earl, who already on 17 October 1780 had been created Baron Brudenell, of Deene in the County of Northampton, in the Peerage of Great Britain, in his own right. However, he died childless in 1811 when the barony of 1780 became extinct. He was succeeded in the remaining titles by his nephew, Robert, the 6th Earl, only son of Robert Brudenell, third son of the 3rd Earl. The 6th Earl's only son, James, 7th Earl, gained fame for his role in the Charge of the Light Brigade during the Crimean War. He was childless and on his death in 1868 the titles were inherited by his second cousin, George, 2nd Marquess of Ailesbury, grandson of Thomas Brudenell, the fourth and youngest son of the 3rd Earl. Thomas had succeeded his maternal uncle, the 3rd Earl of Ailesbury and 4th Earl of Elgin, in 1747 as Baron Bruce, of Tottenham in the County of Wilts, had in 1766 assumed the surname "Brudenell-Bruce", and had in 1776 been created Earl of Ailesbury in the Peerage of Great Britain. The 1st Earl of Ailesbury was succeeded by his son, Charles, the 2nd Earl of Ailesbury, who in 1821 had been created Viscount Savernake, of Savernake Forest in the County of Wilts, Earl Bruce, of Whorlton in the County of York, and Marquess of Ailesbury, in the County of Buckingham. He was succeeded by his son, the aforementioned 2nd Marquess of Ailesbury and 8th Earl of Cardigan. For further history of the titles, see Marquess of Ailesbury.

The Earldom remains united with the Marquessate of Ailesbury; and indeed, since the descendants of the 1st Earl of Ailesbury are the only remaining descendants of the 1st Earl of Cardigan, the titles will never be separated. The Earldom remains visible, however, as it is used as a courtesy title by the heirs apparent to the Marquessate.

The family seat Deene Park was not united with the marquessate but was passed down to Commodore Lord Robert Thomas Brudenell-Bruce, the second surviving son of the 3rd Marquess. Lord Robert's son George inherited the family seat along with the family's remaining estates in Leicestershire and Northamptonshire and reverted the family name back to "Brudenell" by Royal Licence. Deene Park is currently the residence of George's grandson Robert Brudenell.

== Baron Brudenell (1628) ==
- Thomas Brudenell, 1st Baron Brudenell (c. 1593–1663) (Created Earl of Cardigan in 1661)

== Earls of Cardigan (1661) ==
- Thomas Brudenell, 1st Earl of Cardigan (c. 1593–1663)
- Robert Brudenell, 2nd Earl of Cardigan (1607-1703)
- George Brudenell, 3rd Earl of Cardigan (1692–1732)
- George Brudenell, later Montagu, 4th Earl of Cardigan (1712–1790) (created Marquess of Monthermer and Duke of Montagu in 1766 and Baron Montagu of Boughton in 1786)

== Dukes of Montagu (1766), Baron Montagu (1786) ==
- George Brudenell, later Montagu, 1st Duke of Montagu, 1st Marquess of Monthermer, 4th Earl of Cardigan, 4th Baron Brudenell, 1st Baron Montagu (1712–1790)
  - John Montagu, Marquess of Monthermer, 1st Baron Montagu (of 1762) (1735–1770)

== Earls of Cardigan (1661; Reverted) ==
- James Brudenell, 5th Earl of Cardigan, 5th Baron Brudenell, 1st Baron Brudenell (of 1780: extinct) (1715–1811)
- Robert Brudenell, 6th Earl of Cardigan, 6th Baron Brudenell (1760–1837) (nephew of his predecessor)
- James Thomas Brudenell, 7th Earl of Cardigan, 7th Baron Brudenell (1797–1868) (son of his predecessor)
- George William Frederick Brudenell-Bruce, 2nd Marquess of Ailesbury, 8th Earl of Cardigan, 8th Baron Brudenell (1804–1878) (2nd cousin to his predecessor)

see Marquess of Ailesbury for further succession

== Family tree ==
Brudenell and Bruce family tree including: Earls and Marquesses of Ailesbury, Earls of Cardigan, Earls of Elgin, and Earls of Kincardine family tree

Edward Bruce of Blairhall c. 1505–1565
Lord Kinloss, 1602 Lord Bruce of Kinloss, 1604; Lord Bruce of Kinloss, 1608
Edward Bruce; 1548–1611; 1st Lord Kinloss, etc.	George Bruce of Carnock c. 1550–1625	Margaret Primrose
Earl of Elgin and Baron Bruce of Whorlton in the County of York, 1633
Edward Bruce; 1594–1613; 2nd Lord Kinloss, etc.	Thomas Bruce; 1599–1663; 1st Earl of Elgin, etc., 3rd Lord Kinloss, etc.	Mary Preston	George Bruce (2nd) of Carnock d. 1643	Robert Bruce of Broomhall d. 1652
Earl of Ailesbury (1st creation), Viscount Bruce, and Baron Bruce of Skelton, 1664	Baron Brudenell of Stonton in the County of Leicester, 1628 Earl of Cardigan, 1661	Earl of Kincardine and Lord Bruce of Torry, 1647	See also: Dukes of Montrose family tree for the a different creation of the Earl of Kincardine 1644
Robert Bruce; 1627–1685; 2nd Earl of Elgin, etc., 1st Earl of Ailesbury, etc., 4th Lord Kinloss, etc.	Thomas Brudenell c. 1583–1663; 1st Earl of Cardigan, etc.	Edward Bruce d. 1662; 1st Earl of Kincardine, etc.	Alexander Bruce c. 1629–1680; 2nd Earl of Kincardine, etc.	Alexander Bruce d. 1706; 4th Earl of Kincardine, etc.
Thomas Bruce; 1656–1741; 3rd Earl of Elgin, etc., 2nd Earl of Ailesbury, etc., 5th Lord Kinloss, etc.	Robert Brudenell; 1607–1703; 2nd Earl of Cardigan, etc.	Alexander Bruce c. 1666–1705; 3rd Earl of Kincardine, etc.	Robert Bruce d. 1718; 5th Earl of Kincardine, etc.	Alexander Bruce; 1662–1721; 6th Earl of Kincardine, etc.	Thomas Bruce; 1663–1739/1740; 7th Earl of Kincardine, etc.
Baron Bruce of Tottenham in the County of Wilts, 1746
Charles Bruce; 1682–1747; 4th Earl of Elgin, etc., 3rd Earl of Ailesbury, etc., 6th Lord Kinloss, etc., 1st Baron Bruce of Tottenham	George Brudenell; 1685–1732; 3rd Earl of Cardigan, etc.	Elizabeth Brudenell; 1689–1745	William Bruce; 1710–1740; 8th Earl of Kincardine, etc.
Earldom of Ailesbury, Viscountcy of Bruce, Whorlton Barony Bruce, Barony of Bruce of Skelton, and Lordship of Kinloss extinct, 1747
Earl of Ailesbury Buckinghamshire, Great Britain (2nd creation), 1747
George Brudenell, later Montagu; 1712–1790; Duke of Montagu, Marquess of Monthermer, 4th Earl of Cardigan, etc.	James Brudenell; 1725–1811; 5th Earl of Cardigan, etc.	Robert Brudenell; 1726–1768	Thomas Brudenell-Bruce; 1729–1814; 1st Earl of Ailesbury, 2nd Baron Bruce of Tottenham	Charles Bruce; 1732–1771; 5th Earl of Elgin, etc., 9th Earl of Kincardine, etc.
Marquess of Ailesbury, Earl Bruce of Whorlton, County of York, and Viscount Savernake of Savernake Forest, Wiltshire, 1821
Robert Brudenell; 1760–1837; 6th Earl of Cardigan, etc.	Charles Brudenell-Bruce; 1773–1856; 1st Marquess of Ailesbury, etc., 2nd Earl of Ailesbury, 3rd Baron Bruce of Tottenham	William Robert Bruce; 1764–1771; 6th Earl of Elgin, etc., 10th Earl of Kincardine, etc.	Thomas Bruce; 1766–1841; 7th Earl of Elgin, etc., 11th Earl of Kincardine, etc.
Baron Elgin of Elgin, 1849
James Brudenell🐴 1797–1868; 7th Earl of Cardigan, etc.	George Brudenell-Bruce; 1804–1878; 2nd Marquess of Ailesbury, etc., 8th Earl of Cardigan, etc., 3rd Earl of Ailesbury, 4th Baron Bruce of Tottenham	Ernest Brudenell-Bruce; 1811–1886; 3rd Marquess of Ailesbury, etc., 9th Earl of Cardigan, etc., 4th Earl of Ailesbury, 5th Baron Bruce of Tottenham	James Bruce; 1811–1863; 8th Earl of Elgin, etc., 12th Earl of Kincardine, etc., 1st Baron Elgin
George John Brudenell-Bruce; 1839–1868	Henry Brudenell-Bruce; 1842–1911; 5th Marquess of Ailesbury, etc., 11th Earl of Cardigan, etc., 6th Earl of Ailesbury, 7th Baron Bruce of Tottenham	Victor Alexander Bruce; 1849–1917; 9th Earl of Elgin, etc., 13th Earl of Kincardine, etc., 2nd Baron Elgin
George William Thomas Brudenell-Bruce; 1863–1894; 4th Marquess of Ailesbury, etc., 10th Earl of Cardigan, etc., 5th Earl of Ailesbury, 6th Baron Bruce of Tottenham	George William James Chandos Brudenell-Bruce; 1873–1961; 6th Marquess of Ailesbury, etc., 12th Earl of Cardigan, etc., 7th Earl of Ailesbury, 8th Baron Bruce of Tottenham	Edward James Bruce; 1881–1968; 10th Earl of Elgin, etc., 14th Earl of Kincardine, etc., 3rd Baron Elgin
Chandos Sydney Cedric Brudenell-Bruce; 1904–1974; 7th Marquess of Ailesbury, etc., 13th Earl of Cardigan, etc., 8th Earl of Ailesbury, 9th Baron Bruce of Tottenham
Michael Sydney Cedric Brudenell-Bruce; 1926–2024; 8th Marquess of Ailesbury, etc., 14th Earl of Cardigan, etc., 9th Earl of Ailesbury, 10th Baron Bruce of Tottenham	Andrew Douglas Alexander Thomas Bruce b. 1924; 11th Earl of Elgin, etc., 15th Earl of Kincardine, etc., 4th Baron Elgin
David Michael James Brudenell-Bruce b. 1952; 9th Marquess of Ailesbury, etc., 15th Earl of Cardigan, etc., 10th Earl of Ailesbury, 11th Baron Bruce of Tottenham	Charles Edward Bruce b. 1961 styled Lord Bruce
Heir apparent to the Earldom of Elgin and the Earldom of Kincardine
Thomas James Brudenell-Bruce b. 1982 styled Earl of Cardigan
Heir apparent to the Marquessate of Ailesbury and Earldom of Cardigan

== Sources ==
- Kidd, Charles, ed. (1903). Debrett's peerage, baronetage, knightage, and companionage. London: Dean and son. p. 198.
- Joan Wake, The History of the Brudenells of Deene (London: Cassels) 1953.
- "Archival material relating to Brudenell, family, Earls of Cardigan". UK National Archives.

Baronetage of England
Preceded by Tresham baronets	Brudenell baronets 29 June 1611	Succeeded by St Paul baronets
