= Earl of Kincardine =

Title in the peerage of Scotland

Earldom of Kincardine held with Earldom of Elgin
- Or, a saltire and chief gules on a canton argent a lion rampant azure armed and langued of the second
- Creation date: 1647
- Created by: Charles I
- Peerage: Peerage of Scotland
- First holder: Edward Bruce, 1st Earl of Kincardine
- Present holder: Alexander Bruce, 15th Earl of Kincardine
- Heir apparent: Charles Bruce, Lord Bruce
- Remainder to: Heirs male forever, bearing the name Bruce
- Subsidiary titles: Baron Elgin; Lord Bruce of Kinloss; Lord Bruce of Torry
- Seat: Broomhall House
- Motto: Fuimus ("We have been")

The title Earl of Kincardine was created in 1647 in the Peerage of Scotland for Edward Bruce, grandson of George Bruce of Carnock, who was the younger brother of Edward Bruce, 1st Lord Kinloss, the father of Thomas Bruce, 1st Earl of Elgin.

Charles Bruce, the ninth Earl of Kincardine, inherited the title Earl of Elgin in 1747, and the Earldoms of Elgin and Kincardine have remained united since.

== Earls of Kincardine, first creation (1647) ==
- Edward Bruce, 1st Earl of Kincardine (died 1662)
- Alexander Bruce, 2nd Earl of Kincardine (c. 1629–1680)
- Alexander Bruce, 3rd Earl of Kincardine (c. 1666–1705)
- Alexander Bruce, 4th Earl of Kincardine (died 1706) first cousin once removed of the Alexander Bruce (the 3rd Earl)
- Robert Bruce, 5th Earl of Kincardine (died 1718), eldest son of Alexander Bruce (the 4th Earl)
- Alexander Bruce, 6th Earl of Kincardine (1662–1721), second son of Alexander Bruce (the 4th Earl)
- Thomas Bruce, 7th Earl of Kincardine (1663–1739/1740), third and youngest son of Alexander Bruce (the 4th Earl)
- William Bruce, 8th Earl of Kincardine (1710–1740), son of Thomas Bruce
- Charles Bruce, 5th Earl of Elgin and 9th Earl of Kincardine (1732–1771), son of William Bruce
- William Robert Bruce, 6th Earl of Elgin and 10th Earl of Kincardine (1764–1771), first son of Charles Bruce, 5th Earl of Elgin
- Thomas Bruce, 7th Earl of Elgin, 11th Earl of Kincardine (1766–1841) of the eponymous Elgin Marbles, second son of Charles Bruce, 5th Earl of Elgin
- James Bruce, 8th Earl of Elgin, 12th Earl of Kincardine (1811–1863)
- Victor Alexander Bruce, 9th Earl of Elgin, 13th Earl of Kincardine (1849–1917)
- Edward James Bruce, 10th Earl of Elgin, 14th Earl of Kincardine (1881–1968)
- Andrew Bruce, 11th Earl of Elgin, 15th Earl of Kincardine (born 1924)

== Earls of Kincardine, second creation (1707) ==
- See Duke of Montrose

== Family tree ==
Brudenell and Bruce family tree including: Earls and Marquesses of Ailesbury, Earls of Cardigan, Earls of Elgin, and Earls of Kincardine family tree

Edward Bruce of Blairhall c. 1505–1565
Lord Kinloss, 1602 Lord Bruce of Kinloss, 1604; Lord Bruce of Kinloss, 1608
Edward Bruce; 1548–1611; 1st Lord Kinloss, etc.	George Bruce of Carnock c. 1550–1625	Margaret Primrose
Earl of Elgin and Baron Bruce of Whorlton in the County of York, 1633
Edward Bruce; 1594–1613; 2nd Lord Kinloss, etc.	Thomas Bruce; 1599–1663; 1st Earl of Elgin, etc., 3rd Lord Kinloss, etc.	Mary Preston	George Bruce (2nd) of Carnock d. 1643	Robert Bruce of Broomhall d. 1652
Earl of Ailesbury (1st creation), Viscount Bruce, and Baron Bruce of Skelton, 1664	Baron Brudenell of Stonton in the County of Leicester, 1628 Earl of Cardigan, 1661	Earl of Kincardine and Lord Bruce of Torry, 1647	See also: Dukes of Montrose family tree for the a different creation of the Earl of Kincardine 1644
Robert Bruce; 1627–1685; 2nd Earl of Elgin, etc., 1st Earl of Ailesbury, etc., 4th Lord Kinloss, etc.	Thomas Brudenell c. 1583–1663; 1st Earl of Cardigan, etc.	Edward Bruce d. 1662; 1st Earl of Kincardine, etc.	Alexander Bruce c. 1629–1680; 2nd Earl of Kincardine, etc.	Alexander Bruce d. 1706; 4th Earl of Kincardine, etc.
Thomas Bruce; 1656–1741; 3rd Earl of Elgin, etc., 2nd Earl of Ailesbury, etc., 5th Lord Kinloss, etc.	Robert Brudenell; 1607–1703; 2nd Earl of Cardigan, etc.	Alexander Bruce c. 1666–1705; 3rd Earl of Kincardine, etc.	Robert Bruce d. 1718; 5th Earl of Kincardine, etc.	Alexander Bruce; 1662–1721; 6th Earl of Kincardine, etc.	Thomas Bruce; 1663–1739/1740; 7th Earl of Kincardine, etc.
Baron Bruce of Tottenham in the County of Wilts, 1746
Charles Bruce; 1682–1747; 4th Earl of Elgin, etc., 3rd Earl of Ailesbury, etc., 6th Lord Kinloss, etc., 1st Baron Bruce of Tottenham	George Brudenell; 1685–1732; 3rd Earl of Cardigan, etc.	Elizabeth Brudenell; 1689–1745	William Bruce; 1710–1740; 8th Earl of Kincardine, etc.
Earldom of Ailesbury, Viscountcy of Bruce, Whorlton Barony Bruce, Barony of Bruce of Skelton, and Lordship of Kinloss extinct, 1747
Earl of Ailesbury Buckinghamshire, Great Britain (2nd creation), 1747
George Brudenell, later Montagu; 1712–1790; Duke of Montagu, Marquess of Monthermer, 4th Earl of Cardigan, etc.	James Brudenell; 1725–1811; 5th Earl of Cardigan, etc.	Robert Brudenell; 1726–1768	Thomas Brudenell-Bruce; 1729–1814; 1st Earl of Ailesbury, 2nd Baron Bruce of Tottenham	Charles Bruce; 1732–1771; 5th Earl of Elgin, etc., 9th Earl of Kincardine, etc.
Marquess of Ailesbury, Earl Bruce of Whorlton, County of York, and Viscount Savernake of Savernake Forest, Wiltshire, 1821
Robert Brudenell; 1760–1837; 6th Earl of Cardigan, etc.	Charles Brudenell-Bruce; 1773–1856; 1st Marquess of Ailesbury, etc., 2nd Earl of Ailesbury, 3rd Baron Bruce of Tottenham	William Robert Bruce; 1764–1771; 6th Earl of Elgin, etc., 10th Earl of Kincardine, etc.	Thomas Bruce; 1766–1841; 7th Earl of Elgin, etc., 11th Earl of Kincardine, etc.
Baron Elgin of Elgin, 1849
James Brudenell🐴 1797–1868; 7th Earl of Cardigan, etc.	George Brudenell-Bruce; 1804–1878; 2nd Marquess of Ailesbury, etc., 8th Earl of Cardigan, etc., 3rd Earl of Ailesbury, 4th Baron Bruce of Tottenham	Ernest Brudenell-Bruce; 1811–1886; 3rd Marquess of Ailesbury, etc., 9th Earl of Cardigan, etc., 4th Earl of Ailesbury, 5th Baron Bruce of Tottenham	James Bruce; 1811–1863; 8th Earl of Elgin, etc., 12th Earl of Kincardine, etc., 1st Baron Elgin
George John Brudenell-Bruce; 1839–1868	Henry Brudenell-Bruce; 1842–1911; 5th Marquess of Ailesbury, etc., 11th Earl of Cardigan, etc., 6th Earl of Ailesbury, 7th Baron Bruce of Tottenham	Victor Alexander Bruce; 1849–1917; 9th Earl of Elgin, etc., 13th Earl of Kincardine, etc., 2nd Baron Elgin
George William Thomas Brudenell-Bruce; 1863–1894; 4th Marquess of Ailesbury, etc., 10th Earl of Cardigan, etc., 5th Earl of Ailesbury, 6th Baron Bruce of Tottenham	George William James Chandos Brudenell-Bruce; 1873–1961; 6th Marquess of Ailesbury, etc., 12th Earl of Cardigan, etc., 7th Earl of Ailesbury, 8th Baron Bruce of Tottenham	Edward James Bruce; 1881–1968; 10th Earl of Elgin, etc., 14th Earl of Kincardine, etc., 3rd Baron Elgin
Chandos Sydney Cedric Brudenell-Bruce; 1904–1974; 7th Marquess of Ailesbury, etc., 13th Earl of Cardigan, etc., 8th Earl of Ailesbury, 9th Baron Bruce of Tottenham
Michael Sydney Cedric Brudenell-Bruce; 1926–2024; 8th Marquess of Ailesbury, etc., 14th Earl of Cardigan, etc., 9th Earl of Ailesbury, 10th Baron Bruce of Tottenham	Andrew Douglas Alexander Thomas Bruce b. 1924; 11th Earl of Elgin, etc., 15th Earl of Kincardine, etc., 4th Baron Elgin
David Michael James Brudenell-Bruce b. 1952; 9th Marquess of Ailesbury, etc., 15th Earl of Cardigan, etc., 10th Earl of Ailesbury, 11th Baron Bruce of Tottenham	Charles Edward Bruce b. 1961 styled Lord Bruce
Heir apparent to the Earldom of Elgin and the Earldom of Kincardine
Thomas James Brudenell-Bruce b. 1982 styled Earl of Cardigan
Heir apparent to the Marquessate of Ailesbury and Earldom of Cardigan
