= Action of 18 March 1748 =

1748 naval battle

Coordinates: 37.008°N 9.028°W

- Part of the War of Jenkins' Ear
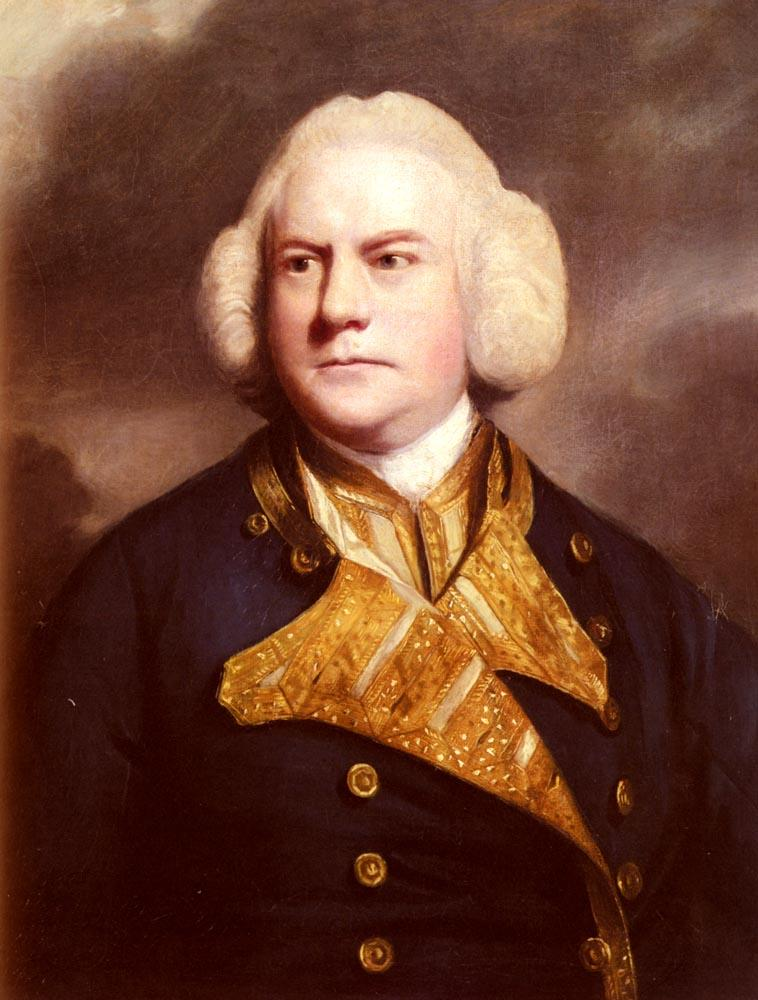
- A portrait of the British commander Thomas Cotes
Date	18 March 1748
Location	Off Cape St Vincent, Atlantic Ocean
Result	British victory

Belligerents
Great Britain	Spain

Commanders and leaders
Thomas Cotes	Juan de Egues

Strength
4 ships of the line 2 frigates	9 ships of the line 17 merchant ships

Casualties and losses
Unknown	5 merchant ships captured

The action of 18 March 1748 was a naval engagement during the War of Jenkins' Ear in which a fleet of six Royal Naval vessels captured a number of merchantman in a successful engagement against a Spanish convoy escorted by nine ships of the line and frigates.

== Battle ==
Six British warships were patrolling off Cape St. Vincent under the command of Captain Thomas Cotes. They ranged in size from the 70-gun HMS Edinburgh, under Cotes's command, through the 60-gun Eagle, Windsor, and Princess Louisa, to the 24-gun Inverness and the frigate Gax. Lookouts sighted a Spanish convoy, and Cotes pursued it. The British caught up with the tail end of the convoy and an action ensued.

The escorting Spanish ships of the line were Soberbio (74), Leon (74), Oriente (70), Colorado (70), Brillante (64), Pastora (64), Rosario (60), Xavier (54) and Galga (54). Three merchant ships, from Cádiz to Vera Cruz, and two others for Cartagena, were intercepted and captured out of a Spanish fleet of 17 merchantmen, under a convoy of nine ships of the line. The rest of the convoy managed to escape under cover of darkness with their escorting ships.
