= William Burke (author) =

English pamphleteer, official and politician (1728/30–1798)

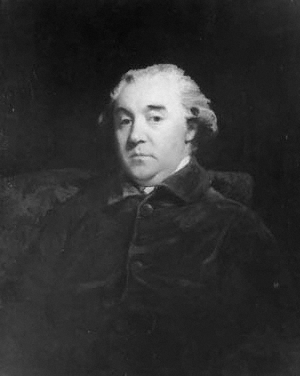
- Portrait by Sir Joshua Reynolds, c. 1778

Under-Secretary of State
- In office July 1765 – February 1767 Serving with Peter Michael Morin
- Minister: Henry Seymour Conway
- Preceded by: Edward Sedgwick
- Succeeded by: Lauchlin Macleane

Member of Parliament for Great Bedwyn
- In office 16 June 1766 – 11 March 1768 Serving with: Charles Monson; Thomas Fludyer
- Preceded by: William Woodley
- Succeeded by: Robert Brudenell
- In office 20 May 1768 – 30 September 1774 Serving with: James Brudenell; William Northey; Benjamin Hopkins
- Preceded by: Robert Brudenell
- Succeeded by: Paul Methuen

Personal details
- Born: 29 June 1729 (baptised) Marylebone, Westminster, Middlesex
- Died: 5 March 1798 (aged 68) Braddan, Isle of Man
- Party: Whig (Rockinghamite)
- Relations: Edmund Burke (cousin, dubious)
- Parent(s): John Burke & Elizabeth Burke
- Education: Westminster School
- Alma mater: Christ Church, Oxford
- Occupation: Politician, writer, administrator

William Burke (baptised 29 June 1729 – 5 March 1798) was an English pamphleteer, official, and politician. He was one of the supposed authors of Junius's Letters.

== Early life ==
William Burke, the son of barrister John Burke and only very questionably a kinsman of Edmund Burke, called though "cousin", was born in London. He was admitted to Westminster School in 1743, and elected to Christ Church, Oxford in 1747. He contributed a copy of elegiacs to the university collection on the death of the Prince of Wales in 1751, and took the degree of B.C.L. in 1755. The two kinsmen were travelling companions in 1752, worked together on the Account of the European Settlements in America, which seems to have been written by W. Burke, and joined in befriending Emin the Armenian.

In 1763 Burke appeared as the friend of Ralph Verney, 2nd Earl Verney, and a confidential mediator between him and George Grenville. He was under-secretary to Henry Seymour Conway, the Secretary of State for the Southern Department, and the following year was moved into the northern department. On the downfall of the Rockingham ministry Burke resigned his office, which brought him £1,000 a year.

He and Edmund Burke had befriended James Barry, a Cork painter, and sent him to Italy at their expense to study, and in a letter written to Barry in 1766 Burke says that their affairs—evidently speaking of his kinsmen Edmund and Richard—were so "well arranged" that they were not uneasy at the prospect of a change in the ministry which would entail loss of place.

== In parliament ==
Burke owed his return to parliament as member for Great Bedwyn in Wiltshire, on 16 June 1766, to his friendship with Lord Verney, who seems to have been a partner in speculations. In March 1768 Robert Brudenell was returned in his place, but, as the latter chose another constituency, Burke regained his seat in the following May, and held it until the dissolution in September 1774. Burke did not take a prominent part in the debates of the house. "As an orator", Horace Walpole says, "he had neither manner nor talents, and yet wanted little of his cousin's presumption". He was pushy and well acquainted with the leaders of the whig party, though generally disliked by them. He lived much with his cousin Edmund, first in Queen Anne Street and afterwards at Gregories.

For a time Burke's stockjobbing transactions prospered. In 1769, however, a crash came, and he was ruined. With William Markham, his old schoolmaster, he had been on terms of friendship. About the time of his disaster, however, their intimacy ceased, and in 1771 Markham, then bishop of Chester, in a letter addressed to Edmund Burke, accused him of saying something in, as it seems, a private conversation with himself which rendered him liable to "a criminal prosecution in a matter of state." This accusation was part of an attack made by the bishop on Edmund Burke, who in the draft of his reply speaks warmly of his kinsman's character, and of the kindness he had shown him in introducing him to Lord Rockingham, in the resignation of his office, and on other occasions. Burke's relationship to his cousin gained him admission to the club in Gerrard Street, and accordingly he appears in Oliver Goldsmith's "Retaliation". Among the various stories told about the occasion of this poem, it is said that the notices Goldsmith first wrote of the Burkes were so severe, that Hugh Boyd persuaded the poet to alter them and entirely rewrite the character of William, for he was sure that if the Burkes saw what was originally written of them the peace of the club would be disturbed.

Having lost his seat for Great Bedwyn, Burke, in the summer of 1774, contested Haslemere in Surrey, was defeated, and petitioned unsuccessfully, the election being confirmed in May 1775.

== To India ==
Broken in fortune and harassed by judgments against him for debt, Burke vainly sought a place in the East India Company's service. The feeling against him was strong, and he found no friends.

In 1777 Burke went to Madras, carrying despatches for George Pigot, 1st Baron Pigot, from whom he hoped to obtain employment. On his arrival at Madras he found Pigot had died. He brought out with him letters of recommendation from Edmund and John Burke to Philip Francis, asking Francis to do something for him in case he should go to Bengal. These letters he sent to Francis, who wrote kindly to him, inviting him to his house, but telling him at the same time that he could do little to help him. He did not accept Francis's invitation, for having obtained the appointment of agent to the Rajah of Tanjore he returned to England.

== Last years ==
In 1779 he went back to India as deputy paymaster of the king's troops, and in 1782 was made commissary-general of the forces in the East Indies. Lord Cornwallis considered that the sending of him out was ‘an unnecessary job,’ and said in a letter to Lord Rawdon, dated 1789, that he had done him what service he could, but that with Burke service meant putting large sums of money into his pocket, and that if he had done that he would have deserved to be impeached, giving two examples of the ‘extraordinary’ proposals which Burke made for his own advantage, and to which he refused to consent.

After his return to England in 1793 Burke lived mainly at Beaconsfield, and Edmund Burke's letters document a decline in his health. He also was pursued for his debt to Earl Verney, who had died in 1791, on behalf of his heir, Mary Verney, Baroness Fermanagh (1737–1810), and was arrested in 1794. Released by an arrangement, his position was still precarious. Edmund had him moved covertly to the Isle of Man, with the help of an associate, Thomas Venables of the Home Office.

William Burke survived Edmund, and died in 1798, on the Isle of Man.

== Works ==
Burke came into notice in 1759, as the author of "Remarks on the Letter to Two Great Men", an answer to Lord Bath's "Letter to Pitt and the Duke of Newcastle" on the prospect of peace. In this pamphlet, and in another entitled "An Examination of the Commercial Principles of the late Negotiation", 1761, Burke, who held the office of secretary to Guadeloupe in 1762, strongly advocated the British retention of the island.

Burke is said by Horace Walpole to have written with ingenuity and sharpness, and to have done good service to his party with his pen. An attempt has been made by Jelinger Cookson Symons to show that he was or may have been the author of Junius's Letters.

Besides the share he had in the European Settlements in America, and the pamphlets on the peace negotiations, from 1764 onwards Burke appears occasionally to have written letters on political matters, chiefly under the signature of "Valens", in the London Evening Post and other papers. Some of these letters are said to have been written in conjunction with Edmund Burke. He also made a translation the address of Jacques-Pierre Brissot to his constituents in 1794, which was submitted to Edmund Burke, who amended it and wrote a preface. Some of Burke's letters are contained in the correspondence of Edmund Burke, and in Barry's works.

Parliament of Great Britain
Preceded by William Woodley; Thomas Cotes	Member of Parliament for Great Bedwyn; 1766–1768; With: Charles Monson to 1767; Thomas Fludyer from 1767	Succeeded by James Brudenell; Robert Brudenell
Preceded by James Brudenell; Robert Brudenell	Member of Parliament for Great Bedwyn; 1768–1774; With: James Brudenell to 1768; William Northey to 1770; Benjamin Hopkins from 1770	Succeeded by The Earl of Courtown; Paul Methuen
