= Elizabeth Brudenell, Countess of Cardigan (1689–1745) =

English noblewoman and petitioner

The Right Honourable The Countess of Cardigan
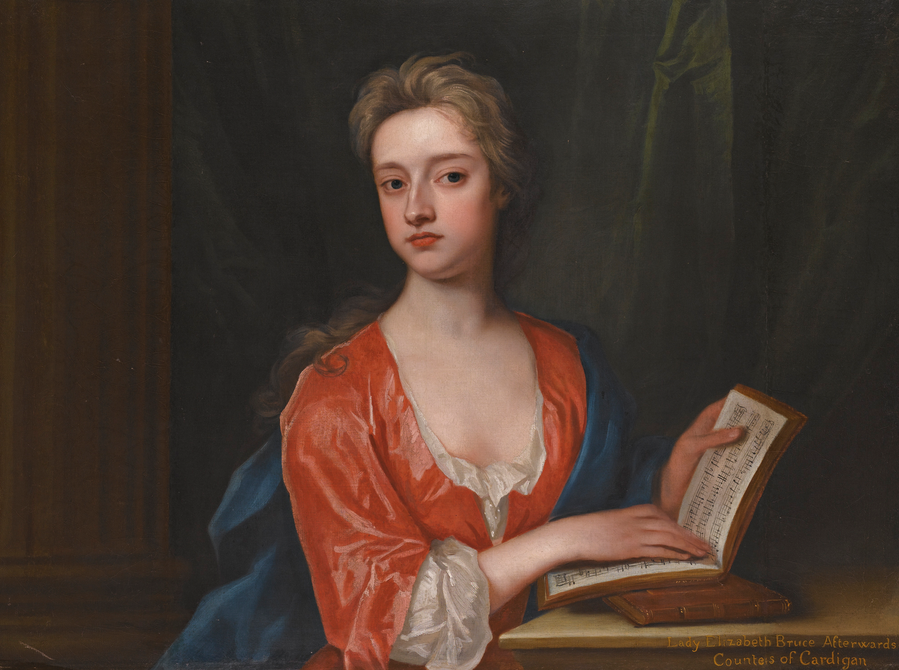
- Lady Elizabeth Bruce, by Godfrey Kneller, 1707
- Born: January 1689
- Died: December 1745 (aged 56)
- Spouse: George Brudenell, 3rd Earl of Cardigan (m. 1707)
- Children: 6+, including George, James, Robert and Thomas
- Father: Thomas Bruce, 2nd Earl of Ailesbury
- Relatives: Charles Bruce, 3rd Earl of Ailesbury (brother); Marie, Princess of Hornes (sister); Robert Bruce, 1st Earl of Ailesbury (grandfather); Henry Seymour, Lord Beauchamp (grandfather); Mary Capel, Duchess of Beaufort (grandmother)

Elizabeth Brudenell, Countess of Cardigan (née Lady Elizabeth Bruce; January 1689 – December 1745), formerly, was a Scottish noblewoman and a petitioner for the foundation of the Foundling Hospital in London. Her husband was George Brudenell, 3rd Earl of Cardigan, and she was the mother of the 4th Earl, who later became 1st Duke of Montagu.

== Life ==
Brudenell was the daughter of Thomas Bruce, 2nd Earl of Ailesbury and 3rd Earl of Elgin, and his first wife, the former Lady Elizabeth Seymour.

She married the earl on 15 May 1707 at St. Martin-in-the-Fields Church, Covent Garden. She had her portrait painted by Sir Godfrey Kneller in the same year. There is also a painting of her by the Dutch artist Herman van der Mijn dating from 1729, in which she is pictured with two of her sons, James and Robert.

Their children included:

- George, 4th Earl of Cardigan (1712-1790), who married Lady Mary Montagu and had children.
- James Brudenell, 5th Earl of Cardigan (1715-1811)
- Hon. Robert Brudenell (1726-1768), who married Anne Bisshopp and had one son, Robert Brudenell, 6th Earl of Cardigan. His descendants included Diana, Princess of Wales.
- Thomas Brudenell-Bruce (1729-1815), who succeeded to the Bruce estates and was created Earl of Ailesbury in 1776.
- Lady Mary Brudenell (died 1813), who married Richard Powys, MP, and had children
- Lady Frances Brudenell, who married Oliver Tilson

Deene Park, Northamptonshire, was the family seat of the Brudenells, where the Countess of Cardigan lived after her marriage. Her eldest son, George Brudenell, was born at Cardigan House, Lincoln's Inn Fields, in London.

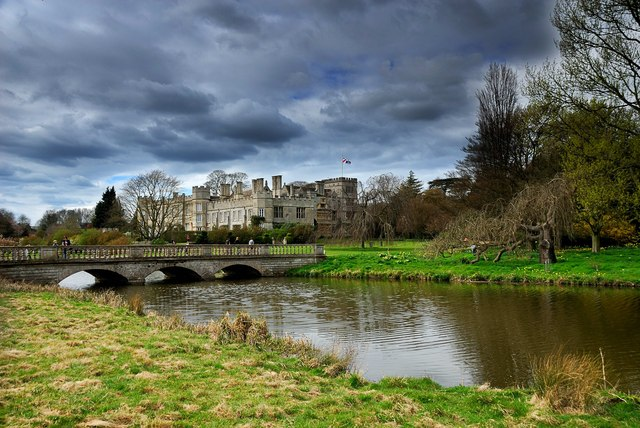
Deene Park, Corby, Northamptonshire

Lord Cardigan died in July 1732 and was succeeded by his eldest son, George. Having inherited the estates of his father-in-law, John Montagu, 2nd Duke of Montagu, in 1749, George assumed the surname "Montagu", and was created Marquess of Monthermer and Duke of Montagu in 1766.

The Countess of Cardigan died in December 1745, aged 56, and is buried at Deene Park.

== Foundling Hospital ==
The Countess was one of twenty-one 'ladies of quality and distinction' who signed a petition in 1735 calling for the establishment of the Foundling Hospital in London, UK. The petition was presented to King George II by philanthropist Thomas Coram and although it was initially rejected, it was instrumental in gaining further support for the children's home which was granted a Royal Charter in 1739.
