= William Elliot of Wells =

William Elliot

Member of Parliament for Calne
- In office 1741–1754

Personal details
- Born: 1701 London, England
- Died: 7 June 1764 (aged 63) London, England
- Resting place: St James's Church, Piccadilly, Westminster
- Spouse: Frances de Nassau d’Auverquerque (m. 1737–1764)
- Parents: William 'the Laceman' Elliot of Minto & Wells (father); Eleanor Tankard (mother)

Military service
- Allegiance: Great Britain
- Branch/service: Army
- Years of service: 1722–1746
- Rank: Lieutenant-Colonel
- Unit: 2nd Troop of Horse Grenadier Guards
- Battles/wars: 1743: Battle of Dettingen; 1745: Battle of Fontenoy

William Elliot of Wells (1701–1764) was an army officer, courtier, and Member of Parliament during the reign of George II.

The son of William Elliot of Wells (1660-1728, known to posterity as the "Laceman", from his trade in gold-embroidered lace from which he made his fortune) and his wife Eleanor née Tankard, the younger William was christened 6 March 1701–2 at St James's Church, Piccadilly, Westminster. Around 1720, he stood as legal guardian to Granville Elliott, the infant son of his elder sister Charlotte Elliot and her recently deceased husband Roger Elliott. He entered the army in 1722 as a cornet in the Royal Regiment of Horse Guards, and in the following year joined Charles Churchill's Regiment of Dragoons as a captain. While serving under Col. Churchill (1679-1740), Elliot witnessed the will of Churchill's mistress, the celebrated actress Anne Oldfield (1683-1730), and was one of the pallbearers at her funeral in 1730.

Elliot inherited his father's estate of Wells, in Roxburghshire, in 1728.

In 1737, Elliot was commissioned as major of the 2nd Troop of Horse Grenadier Guards, of which he was made lieutenant-colonel in 1741. He fought at both Dettingen and Fontenoy, but resigned his commission in 1746. His eldest sister's son, George Augustus Eliott (later Lord Heathfield, defender of Gibraltar), was one of his subordinate officers in the 2nd Troop of Horse Grenadier Guards.

In 1741, Elliot was elected as a Whig Member of Parliament (MP) for Calne, Wiltshire (which seat he held until 1754). Subsequently, in 1743, he was made one of the equerries to George II, and served until the king's death in 1760.

== Family ==
Elliot married – against her father's wishes – Lady Frances de Nassau d’Auverquerque, elder daughter of the Earl of Grantham and Lady Henrietta Butler, daughter of the Earl of Ossory, at St Benet Paul's Wharf, London, on 4 June 1737, with one son:

- Henry Elliot, born 17 April 1741 Westminster, who died young.

In 1758, Lady Frances would have inherited the Scottish title lordship of Dingwall upon the death of her uncle the Earl of Arran, had this title not been forfeited as a consequence of the 1715 attainder of her uncle the Duke of Ormonde following his involvement in the Jacobite risings of that year.

William Elliot died on 7 June 1764 and was buried in St James's Church, Piccadilly, Westminster. Lady Frances Elliot died on 5 April 1772, and was buried with her late husband.

Military offices
Preceded by Unknown	Captain of the Charles Churchill's Regiment of Dragoons; 1723-1737	Succeeded by Unknown
Preceded by Unknown	Major of the 2nd Troop of Horse Grenadier Guards; 1737-1741	Succeeded by Unknown
Preceded by Unknown	Lieutenant-Colonel of the Horse Grenadier Guards; 1741-1746	Succeeded by Unknown
Parliament of Great Britain
Preceded by William Duckett and Walter Hungerford	Member of Parliament for Calne; 1741–1754; With: Walter Hungerford 1741–1747; William Northey 1747–1754	Succeeded by William Northey and Thomas Duckett
