= Martha Bruce, Countess of Elgin =

British noblewoman (1739-1810)

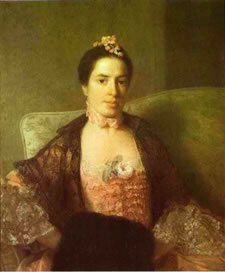
Portrait by Allan Ramsay

Martha Bruce, Countess of Elgin and Kincardine (27 May 1739 – 21 June 1810), known for most of her life as Lady Elgin, was a British noblewoman and governess to Princess Charlotte of Wales, daughter of the future King George IV, at the time second in line to the throne. She was the wife of Charles Bruce, 5th Earl of Elgin, and mother of the collector Thomas Bruce, 7th Earl of Elgin.

== Marriage and children ==
The only child of wealthy banker Thomas Whyte, Esq. of Kirkcaldy, Martha Whyte married Charles Bruce, Earl of Elgin and Kincardine, at Edinburgh on 1 June 1759. Their eight children were Thomas Bruce, 7th Earl of Elgin (1766–1841), known for the removal of the Elgin Marbles from the Parthenon in Athens; Lady Martha Bruce (1760–1767); Lady Janet Bruce (1761–1767); William Bruce, Lord Bruce (15 January 1763 – 27 March 1763); William Bruce, 6th Earl of Elgin (1764–1771); Charles Andrew Bruce (1768–1810), Governor of Prince of Wales's Island; James Bruce (1769–1798), Member of Parliament for Marlborough; and Lady Charlotte Bruce (28 May 1771 – March 1816), who married Captain (later Admiral) Philip Charles Durham.

In 1762, Lady Elgin's portrait was painted by the fashionable Allan Ramsay, who the same year painted King George III.

Lady Elgin's eldest son, William Robert, born in 1763, lived only ten weeks. Her two eldest daughters, Martha and Janet, died in 1767 at the ages of seven and six. On 14 May 1771, she was widowed, and only two months later her second son, also called William Robert, the new Lord Elgin, died at the age of seven. Her remaining four children, three sons and a daughter, all lived to adulthood, but on 10 July 1798 her youngest surviving son, James, then aged twenty-nine, was drowned while crossing the River Don at Barnby Dun in Yorkshire when his horse was swept away by the stream.

== Later life ==
In 1797, on the instructions of King George III, and with the title of "Gouvernante", Lady Elgin was appointed to superintend Princess Charlotte of Wales, only child of the Prince of Wales and already seen as the probable next heir to the throne, with whom she became very close. They lived together in a household otherwise consisting entirely of servants at Warwick House in the St James's district of Westminster, described as "a rather gloomy edifice near Carlton House". However, during 1804, Charlotte's father insisted on Lady Elgin retiring, ostensibly because she had become too old, but probably because the Prince was angry that Charlotte had been taken to visit her grandfather King George without his permission.

According to Burke's Peerage,

The Countess of Elgin filled, with great credit to herself, the important station of governess to her royal highness the deeply-deplored [sic] Princess Charlotte of Wales.

An obituary of Princess Charlotte in 1818 described Elgin as "a very worthy and pious Countess who acted for some years as Gouvernante". This title has sometimes been translated as "guardian" rather than "governess". Elgin's own obituary in The Gentleman's Magazine said of her, "At Twickenham, in her 69th year, the Right hon. Martha Bruce, Countess of Elgin and Kincardine; whose life has been spent in the uniform exercise of piety and benevolence. Her public and private charities were unbounded." However, The Complete Peerage says she died in her 71st year. She was buried at St Mary's, Twickenham.
