= William Duckett (Calne MP, died 1749) =

British Army officer and Whig politician

William Duckett (1 August 1685 – 12 December 1749) of Hartham House, near Corsham, Wiltshire, was a British Army officer and Whig politician who sat in the House of Commons from 1727 to 1741.

Duckett was baptised at Grittleton, Wiltshire on 10 Aug 1685, the second son of Lionel Duckett MP of Hartham House, Corsham. He joined the army and was a cornet in the 1st Dragoon Guards in 1712, serving in Flanders until April 1714. He became lieutenant and adjutant in 1715 and captain-lieutenant in 1720. In 1723 he became a major in the 2nd troop of horse in the Grenadier Guards.

Duckett was returned as a Whig Member of Parliament for the family borough of Calne at the 1727 general election and always voted for the Administration in recorded divisions. He was promoted to lieutenant-colonel in 1729. In August 1733 he was asked by Walpole to bring in Sir Orlando Bridgeman for Calne but excused himself from doing so. He was returned at the 1734 election with Walter Hungerford. He did not stand in 1741, but brought in William Elliot, his subordinate officer, instead. He also retired from the army in that year.

== Family ==
He married, on 8 July 1721, Mary Turberville, daughter of Thomas Turberville of Bere Regis, Dorset, with issue:

- Elizabeth Duckett (1724–1804), who became the second wife of Major-General Granville Elliott, Count Elliott.

Duckett died on 12 December 1749, and was buried at St Peter's Church, Petersham, Richmond upon Thames.

His elder brother George (1684–1732) was a poet and author, who was returned for Calne several times between 1705 and 1723.

Parliament of Great Britain
Preceded by Edmund Pike Heath; Matthew Ducie Moreton	Member of Parliament for Calne; 1727–1741; With: William Wardour 1727-1734; Walter Hungerford 1734-1741	Succeeded by William Elliot; Walter Hungerford
