= Charles Bruce, 5th Earl of Elgin =

Scottish noble (1732–1771)

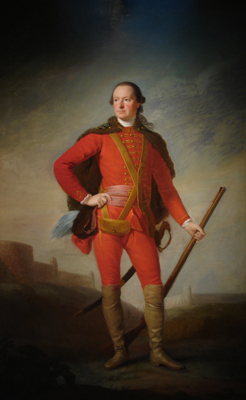
Charles Bruce, Earl of Elgin

Charles Bruce, 5th Earl of Elgin and 9th Earl of Kincardine (6 July 1732 – 14 May 1771) was a Scottish nobleman. He succeeded his cousin Charles Bruce, 3rd Earl of Ailesbury as Earl of Elgin in 1747.

He was the son of William Bruce, 8th Earl of Kincardine and Janet Roberton. His mother was the daughter of James Roberton (principal Lord of Session) and great-granddaughter of advocate and judge Lord Bedlay. He was educated at Rugby School.

He was Grand Master of the Grand Lodge of Scotland from 1761 to 1763. He was a founding member of the Royal and Ancient Golf Club at St Andrews. He built the planned industrial village of Charlestown, Fife.

He is buried in the southern transept of Dunfermline Abbey close to the grave of Robert the Bruce. In 1812, Scottish composer Magdalene Stirling named her Charles Bruce Reel after him.

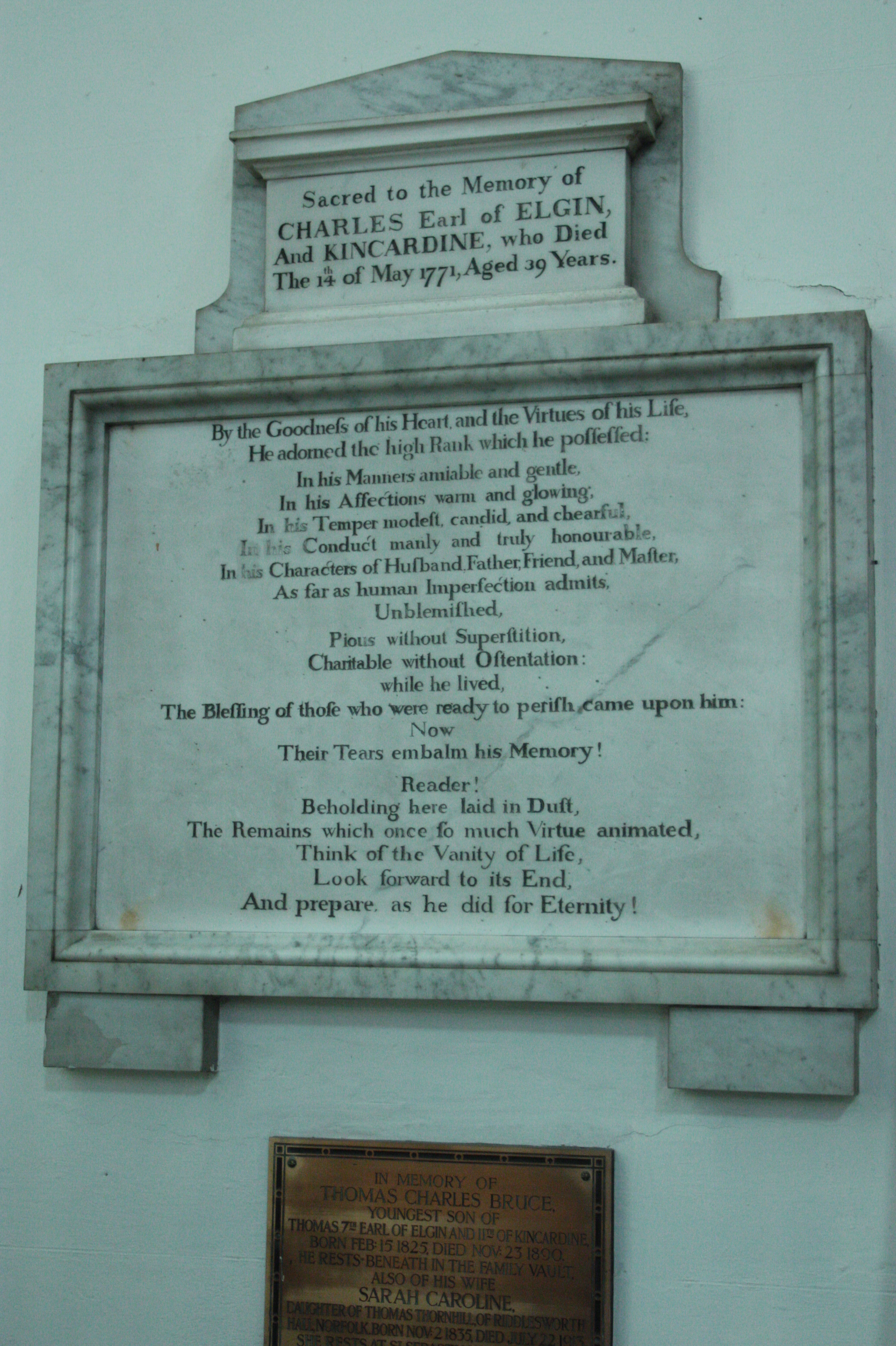
The grave of Sir Charles Bruce, 5th Earl of Elgin, Dunfermline Abbey

== Family ==
On 1 June 1759, Elgin married Martha Whyte (1739–1810), who later became governess to Princess Charlotte of Wales. They had eight children:

- Lady Martha Bruce (1760–), died young
- Lady Janet Bruce (1761–), died young
- William Robert Bruce, Lord Bruce (1763–), died young
- William Robert Bruce, 6th Earl of Elgin (1764–1771)
- Thomas Bruce, 7th Earl of Elgin (1766–1841)
- Hon. Charles Andrew Bruce (1768–1810), Governor of Prince of Wales's Island
- Hon. James Bruce (1769–1798), Member of Parliament
- Lady Charlotte Matilda Bruce (1771–1816), married Admiral Philip Charles Durham

Masonic offices
Preceded by The Earl of Leven	Grand Master of the Grand Lodge of Scotland; 1761 – 1763	Succeeded by The Earl of Kellie
Peerage of Scotland
Preceded by Charles Bruce	Earl of Elgin; 1747–1771	Succeeded by William Bruce
Preceded by William Bruce	Earl of Kincardine; 1740–1771	Succeeded by William Bruce
