= James Bruce (1769–1798) =

James Bruce (1769–1798) was a Member of Parliament for Marlborough in the Parliament of Great Britain from 1796 until 1797.

The youngest of the five sons of Charles Bruce, 5th Earl of Elgin, and of Martha Bruce, Countess of Elgin and Kincardine (1739–1810), Bruce was a brother of the collector Thomas Bruce, 7th Earl of Elgin, known for bringing the Elgin Marbles from Athens. He entered Westminster School in 1778 and was at Christ Church, Oxford, from 1786 to 1790, when he became a member of Lincoln's Inn.

For a year he was a Member of Parliament for Marlborough, taking a seat previously held by his uncle General Thomas Bruce, before resigning by "taking the Chiltern Hundreds". He left parliament to accept a post as a précis writer at the Foreign Office at a salary of £300 a year.

On 10 July 1798, aged only twenty-nine, he was drowned while crossing the River Don at Barnby Dun in Yorkshire, when his horse was swept away by the stream. He was remembered as amiable and virtuous.

Parliament of Great Britain
Preceded by Thomas Bruce; Earl of Dalkeith	Member of Parliament for Marlborough; 1796–1797; Served alongside: Lord Bruce	Succeeded by Lord Bruce; Robert Brudenell
