= William Northey (died 1770) =

English politician, died 1770

William Northey FRS (c. 1722 – 24 December 1770) was an English politician who sat in the House of Commons from 1747 to 1770.

He was the son of William Northey of Compton Basset, Wiltshire and his wife Abigail Webster, the daughter of Sir Thomas Webster, 1st Baronet of Battle Abbey, Sussex. His father had been MP for Calne in 1713 and for Wootton Bassett in 1714.

In 1747 Northey bought the prebend manor of Ivy House, near Chippenham, Wiltshire, which carried one of the two Parliamentary seats for Calne and was duly elected a Member of Parliament (MP) for Calne on 27 June 1747, holding the seat until 1761. He was then elected MP for Maidstone, Kent on 28 March 1761 and held the seat until 18 March 1768. He was lastly elected MP for Great Bedwyn on 13 November 1768 and held the seat until his death in 1770. He was described as a leading and eloquent member of the opposition in parliament.

When the Wiltshire Militia was embodied on 8 November 1758 Northey was commissioned as Lieutenant-Colonel, and exercised the command on behalf of the colonel, Lord Bruce. He was one of the commissioners for trade. He became a Fellow of the Royal Society on 21 June 1753. He was Groom of the Chamber to King George III.

He was a Lord of Trade from 1770 until his death at Ivy House later that year.

Northey married twice on his life. His first wife, Harriet (died 1750), was the daughter of Robert Vyner of Gautby, Lincolnshire. After her death, in 1751, he married Anne Hopkins, daughter of Edward Hopkins, MP, Secretary of State for Ireland. He had 3 sons and 4 daughters. His eldest son William also became an MP. His youngest son Richard changed his surname to Northey Hopkins. His four daughters died unmarried.

Parliament of Great Britain
Preceded by William Elliot; Walter Hungerford	Member of Parliament for Calne with William Elliot 1747–1754; Thomas Duckett 1754–1757; George Hay 1757–1761; 1747–1761	Succeeded by Thomas Duckett; Daniel Bull
Preceded by Gabriel Hanger; Savile Finch	Member of Parliament for Maidstone with Rose Fuller; 1761–1768	Succeeded by Hon. Charles Marsham; Robert Gregory
Preceded by Hon. James Brudenell; William Burke	Member of Parliament for Great Bedwyn with William Burke; 1768–1770	Succeeded by Benjamin Hopkins; William Burke
