= Thomas Bruce (British Army officer) =

British politician

Lieutenant-General The Honourable Thomas Bruce
- Born: 1738; Fifeshire
- Died: 12 December 1797 (aged 58–59); Exeter
- Education: Rugby School
- Military career
- Allegiance: Great Britain
- Branch: British Army
- Service years: 1759–1797
- Rank: Lieutenant-General
- Commands: 65th Regiment of Foot; 100th Regiment of Foot; Governor of Dominica; Windward and Leeward Islands
- Conflicts: American Revolutionary War; Second Anglo-Mysore War; French Revolutionary Wars; West Indies campaign
- Memorials: Exeter Cathedral

Member of Parliament for Marlborough
- In office 1790–1796 Serving with Earl of Courtown & Earl of Dalkeith

Member of Parliament for Great Bedwyn
- In office 1796–1797 Serving with John Wodehouse

Lieutenant-General Thomas Bruce (1738 – 12 December 1797), was a British Army officer and politician, the third son of William Bruce, 8th Earl of Kincardine.

He was educated at Rugby School and joined the British Army, serving in India during the American Revolutionary War and rising to the rank of lieutenant-general in 1796. He commanded the British forces in the West Indies, leading the unsuccessful attack against Martinique in June 1793. He was made Colonel of the 16th (Buckinghamshire) Regiment of Foot in 1788, a position he held until his death.

He was the Member of Parliament for Marlborough, 22 June 1790 – 30 May 1796, and Great Bedwyn, 28 May 1796 – 12 December 1797.

He died unmarried on 12 December 1797.

Military offices
Preceded by James Robertson	Colonel of the 16th (Buckinghamshire) Regiment; 1788–1797	Succeeded by Henry Bowyer
Preceded by Cornelius Cuyler	Commander-in-Chief, Windward and Leeward Islands; 1793	Succeeded by Sir Charles Grey
Parliament of Great Britain
Preceded by The Earl of Courtown; Sir Philip Hales	Member of Parliament for Marlborough; 1790–1796; With: The Earl of Courtown 1790–1793; Earl of Dalkeith 1793–1796	Succeeded by James Bruce; Lord Bruce
Preceded by Viscount Stopford; Edward Hyde East	Member of Parliament for Great Bedwyn; 1796–1797; With: John Wodehouse	Succeeded by John Wodehouse; Sir Robert Buxton
