= Constance Bruce, Countess of Elgin =

Scottish aristocrat and Vicereine of India

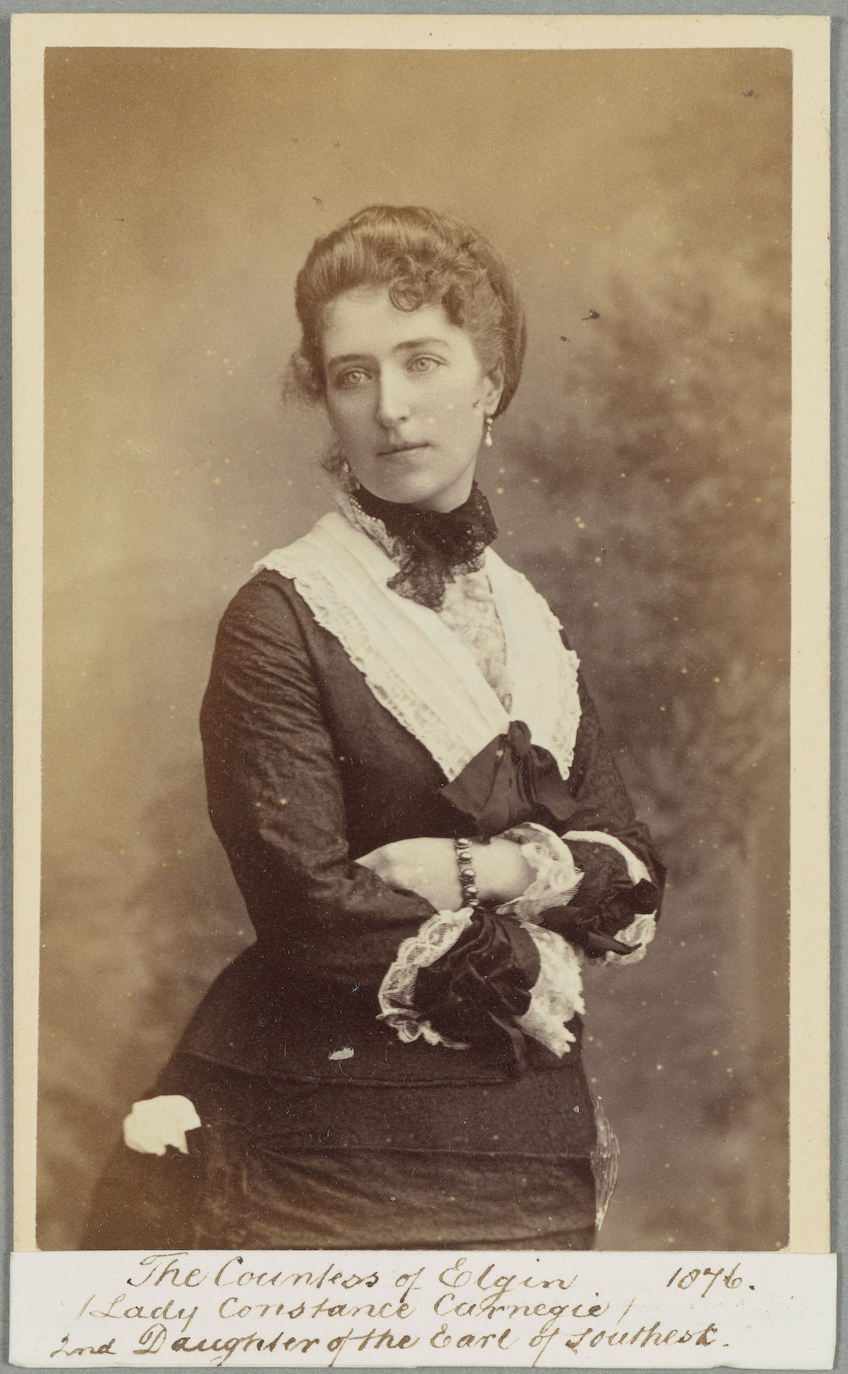
Constance, Countess of Elgin and Kincardine, 1876

Constance Mary Bruce, Countess of Elgin, CI (née Carnegie: 17 September 1851 – 24 September 1909) was a British aristocrat and Vicereine of India. She was the first wife of Victor Bruce, 9th Earl of Elgin, who served as Viceroy of India from 1894 to 1899.

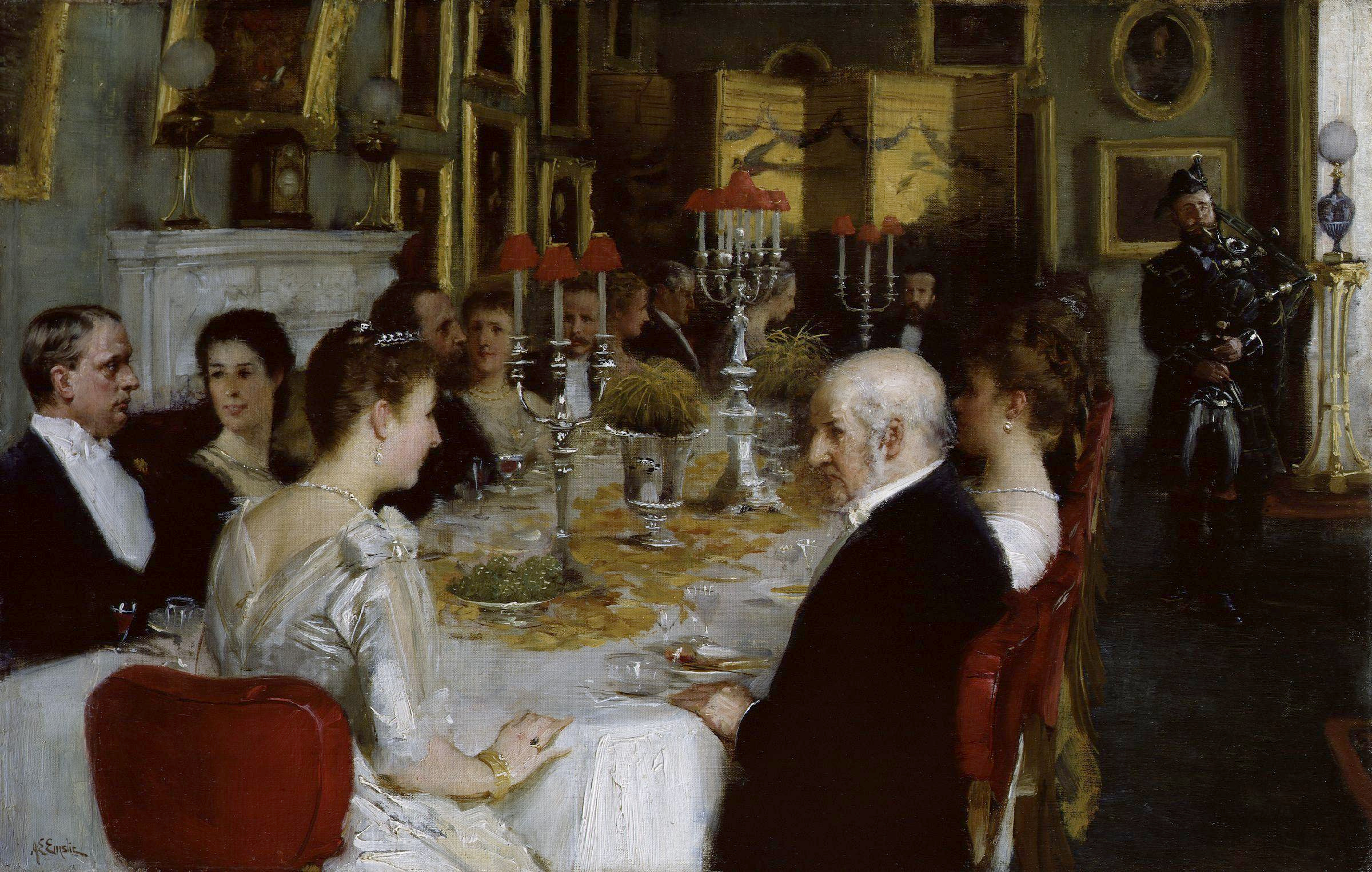
High tea at Haddo House

She was the daughter of James Carnegie, 9th Earl of Southesk and his first wife Lady Catherine Hamilton Noel, the daughter of Charles Noel, 1st Earl of Gainsborough. Her brother was Charles Noel Carnegie, who succeeded to the Earldom of Southesk.

In 1876 she married Victor Alexander Bruce, 9th Earl of Elgin and 13th Earl of Kincardine, whose prominent father James Bruce, 8th Earl of Elgin had formerly also served as a Viceroy of India. They had six sons and five daughters:

- Lady Elizabeth Mary Bruce (11 September 1877 – 13 May 1944)
- Lady Christina Augusta Bruce (25 January 1879 – 12 September 1940)
- Lady Constance Veronica Bruce (24 February 1880 – 7 July 1969)
- Edward James Bruce, 10th Earl of Elgin, 14th Earl of Kincardine (9 June 1881 – 27 November 1968)
- Hon. Robert Bruce (18 November 1882 – 31 October 1959)
- Hon. Alexander Bruce (29 July 1884 – October 1917)
- Lady Marjorie Bruce (12 December 1885 – 23 May 1901)
- Col. Hon. David Bruce (11 June 1888 – 26 August 1964)
- Lady Rachel Catherine Bruce (23 February 1890 – 17 December 1964)
- Capt. Hon. John Bernard Bruce (9 April 1892 – 3 August 1971)
- Hon. Victor Alexander Bruce (13 February 1897 – 19 December 1930).
