= William Bruce, 8th Earl of Kincardine =

The Right Honourable William Bruce
- Earl of Kincardine
- Coat of arms
- Tenure: 1710–1740
- Predecessor: Thomas Bruce, 7th Earl of Kincardine
- Successor: Charles Bruce, 9th Earl of Kincardine
- Died: 8 September 1740
- Spouse: Janet Roberton
- Issue: Lady Christian Bruce; Charles Bruce, 9th Earl of Kincardine; Lt-General Thomas Bruce; Rev. Hon. James Bruce; Lady Rachel Bruce
- Father: Thomas Bruce, 7th Earl of Kincardine
- Mother: Rachel Paunceforth

William Bruce, 8th Earl of Kincardine (died 8 September 1740), the son of Thomas Bruce, 7th Earl of Kincardine and Rachel Paunceforth, became the 8th Lord of Torry and the 8th Earl of Kincardine in 1740.

His wife was Janet Roberton, the daughter of James Roberton, a Lord of Session (in turn a grandson of James Roberton, Lord Bedlay, an ordinary Lord of Session during the Restoration) and his wife Euphemia Burnett.

The couple were second cousins, both descendants of Robert Bruce, Lord Broomhill. Bruce's descent was through his father, Thomas Bruce, 7th Earl of Kincardine, and his grandfather, Alexander, 4th Earl of Kincardine. His wife's mother was the daughter of Janet Bruce, Alexander's sister. Bruce had five children:

- Lady Christian Bruce d. 1810 ar. 28 Apr 1762 James Erskine of Cardross
- Charles Bruce, 9th Earl of Kincardine (who later succeeded as the 5th Earl of Elgin)
- Lt-General Thomas Bruce M.P. for Marlborough 1796 and Great Bedwyn 1796–1797 (d. 12 Dec 1797)
- Rev Hon. James Bruce b. about 1730
- Lady Rachel Bruce m. 1778 John Milnes Esq. d. 1803

His son Charles Bruce inherited the Earldom of Elgin from the extinct line of Charles Bruce, the 3rd Earl of Ailesbury and 4th Earl of Elgin by virtue of their descent from Sir George Bruce, younger brother of Edward, the 1st Lord of Kinloss

Peerage of Scotland
| Preceded by Thomas Bruce | Earl of Kincardine; 1710–1740 | Succeeded by Charles Bruce |
