= Walter Hungerford (MP) =

English Whig politician

Walter Hungerford (9 July 1675 – 1754), of Studley House, near Calne, Wiltshire, was an English Whig politician who sat in the English House of Commons in 1701 and in the British House of Commons from 1734 to 1747.

== Early life ==
Hungerford was the second, but eldest surviving son of Sir George Hungerford of Cadenham House, Bremhill, Wiltshire and his wife, Frances Seymour, daughter of Charles Seymour, 2nd Baron Seymour of Trowbridge. He was sent away to sea as a young man with a loan of £500 from his father. He later raised a lengthy suit in Chancery against his father, and also alienated his sister Frances after claiming the reversion of her house in Yatesbury, a dowry from Sir George, following her husband's death in 1693; he refused to repay the £1,000 mortgage owed to Sir Robert Holford, who threatened to evict Frances. He married Elizabeth Dodson of St Clement Danes, London on 22 November 1703. He succeeded his father in 1712.

== Career ==
Hungerford was returned as Member of Parliament for Calne at the first general election of 1701, where there was a vacancy because his elder brother, George, had died prematurely in 1698 and his brother-in-law, Henry Blake, the sitting member, had fallen out with Sir George Hungerford. He made little or no impression upon the work of the House and he is not known to have spoken. He was not put up to stand at the second general election of 1701. In 1708, he purchased the office of Commissioner of Appeals in Excise worth, £200 a year, from Joseph Addison. He was dismissed from the post in December 1714 despite an appeal from Addison to the Treasury to let him "enjoy the fruits of his purchase".

Hungerford stood at Calne in 1715, but was defeated. He served as High Sheriff of Wiltshire for the year 1727 to 1729. At the 1734 British general election, he was returned again as Whig MP for Calne. He voted against the Spanish convention in 1739 but thenceforth supported the Administration. His only known speeches were on 16 March 1739, when he opposed a motion to take the duty off Irish yarn, 1741 and on 6 December 1743, when he spoke against an opposition motion to discontinue the Hanoverians in English pay. Classed as an Old Whig in 1746, he did not stand again.

== Death and legacy ==
Hungerford used his residence at Studley House as a base from which to purchase further Wiltshire properties, including Rodbourne manor and neighbouring messuages. His wife Elizabeth died in 1749. He died without issue on 31 May 1754 and was buried in the family vault at Bremhill, Wiltshire. He left Rodbourne and Great Durnford manors, Wiltshire, and Stanton Court, Devon, to three nephews.

Parliament of Great Britain
Preceded by Henry Blaake; Henry Chivers	Member of Parliament for Calne; 1701; With: Walter Long	Succeeded by Henry Blaake; Edward Bayntun
Preceded by William Duckett; William Wardour	Member of Parliament for Calne; 1734–1747; With: William Duckett 1734-1741; William Elliot 1741-1747	Succeeded by William Elliot; William Northey
