= Thomas Fludyer =

English merchant and banker, Member of Parliament

Sir Thomas Fludyer FRS (1711 – 19 March 1769) was an English merchant and banker who was a Whig Member of the Parliament of Great Britain in 1767–9.

== Biography ==
Fludyer was the second son of Samuel Fludyer, a London clothier originally from Frome, Somerset, and Elizabeth de Montsalier, daughter of a Huguenot refugee. Sir Samuel Fludyer, 1st Baronet was his elder brother. He was a first cousin once removed of Samuel Romilly, whose grandfather had married Judith de Montsalier. He was by upbringing a religious dissenter.

In 1734, Fludyer was accepted into the Worshipful Company of Clothworkers. In 1738, he was a junior partner in his brother's firm, which grew to dominate the wool market in London if not all of England.

He was knighted on 9 November 1761 at a reception for George III at Guildhall, London, during his brother's term as Lord Mayor.

== Parliamentary career ==
Sir Thomas canvassed for Devizes in 1761 and again in 1765, when he was defeated at the by-election in January 1765. Four months later, he canvassed the borough again before a by-election in May. Later in the year, he thought of standing for New Shoreham. On 20 October 1765, Prime Minister George Grenville wrote to John Sargent, "With regard to Sir Thomas Fludyer's application to you for your recommendation at Shoreham you know that I gave him all the assistance in my power when he was candidate last spring for Devizes and therefore can have no objection to him now supposing that Sir Samuel and he are still in the same sentiments towards me which they were then in." However, he was reluctant to lose again, as on 28 October, Grenville wrote to another possible candidate, Topham Beauclerk, that Fludyer was "unwilling to appear at all without the certainty of success".

On 2 December 1767, Fludyer was brought in for Great Bedwyn by Lord Bruce – cousin of Samuel's wife, Caroline Brudenell – but only held the seat for six weeks until his brother's death in January 1768, at which point he took his brother's seat at Chippenham. He held the seat until his own death on 19 March 1769.

His nephew George Fludyer also sat in Parliament for Chippenham, from 1782 to 1802.

== Personal life ==
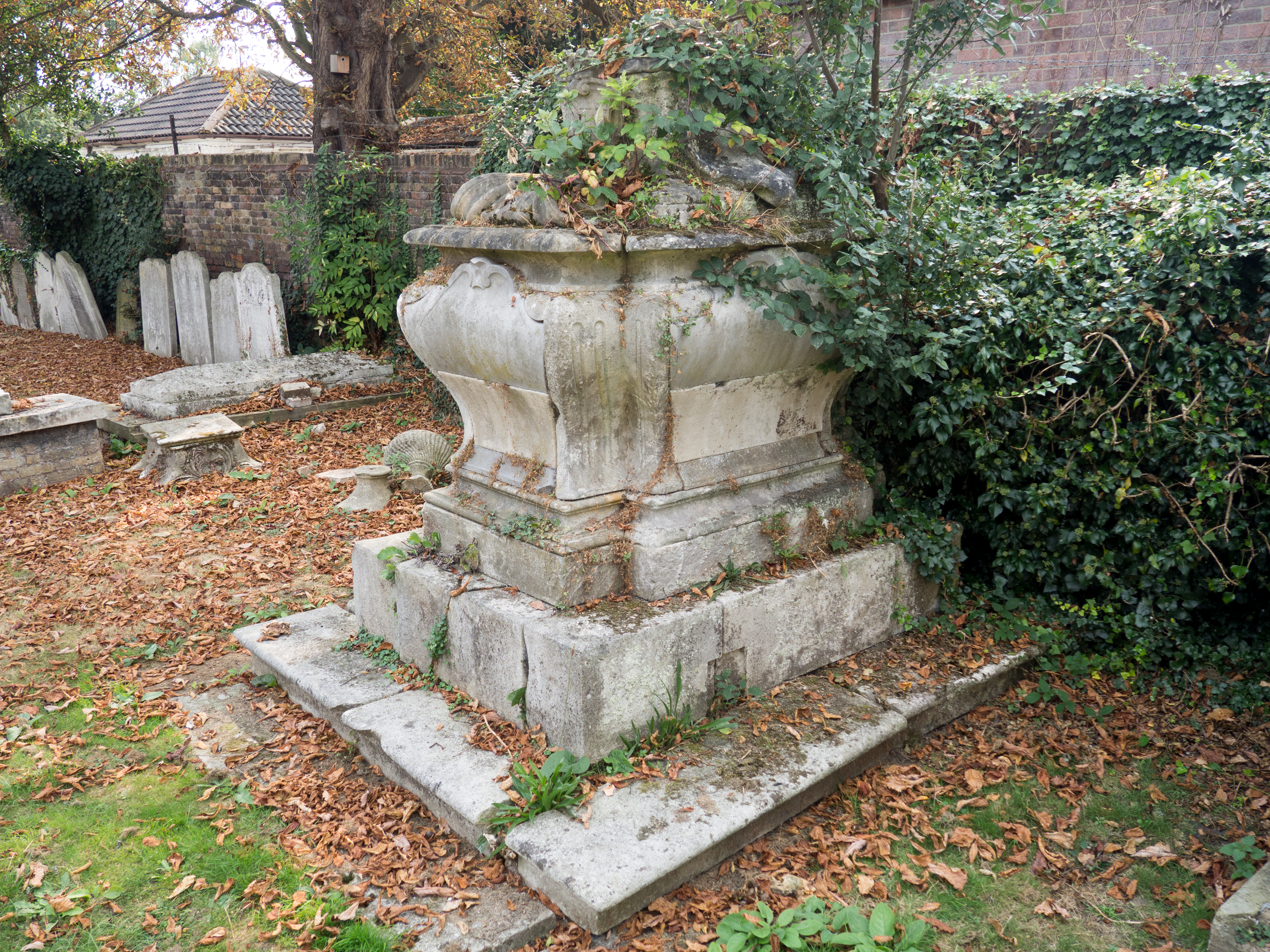
Tomb of Sir Samuel and Sir Thomas Fludyer, Lee Old Churchyard

On 27 March 1742, Fludyer married Mary, daughter of Sir George Champion. They had one daughter, Mary, who married Trevor Roper, 18th Baron Dacre, grandson of Henry Roper, 8th Baron Teynham.

Fludyer was seated in Lee, Kent. He resided in Lee House and in 1768 inherited Dacre House from his brother.

At the time of his death in Lee, Kent, Fludyer held nearly £30,000 of government stock (equivalent to £4,731,000 in 2025).

He is buried in Lee Old Churchyard at St Margaret's. The tomb to both Sir Charles and Sir Thomas, and their wives, is a Grade II-listed monument.

Parliament of Great Britain
Preceded by Thomas Cotes	Member of Parliament for Great Bedwyn; 1767–1768; With: William Burke	Succeeded by Hon. James Brudenell
Preceded by Sir Samuel Fludyer; Sir Edward Bayntun-Rolt	Member of Parliament for Chippenham; 1768–1769; With: Sir Edward Bayntun-Rolt	Succeeded by Henry Dawkins; Sir Edward Bayntun-Rolt
