= Thomas Brudenell, 1st Earl of Cardigan =

English peer and Royalist soldier (c. 1583–1663)

Thomas Brudenell, 1st Earl of Cardigan (c. 1583 – 16 September 1663), known as Sir Thomas Brudenell, Bt, between 1611 and 1628 and as The Lord Brudenell between 1628 and 1661, was an English peer and Royalist soldier.

Brudenell was the son of Robert Brudenell, of Doddington, Huntingdonshire, and Deene, Northamptonshire, by Catherine Taylarde, daughter of Geoffrey Taylarde, and heiress of her grandfather Sir Lawrence Taylarde. He was the grandson of Sir Thomas Brudenell, High Sheriff of Rutland, and the great-grandson of Sir Robert Brudenell, Lord Chief Justice of the Common Pleas. He succeeded to the Deene estates in 1606 on the death of his paternal uncle. In 1611 he was created a Baronet, of Deene in the County of Northampton.

Like many of his family, and his wife's family, he openly professed the Roman Catholic faith. As such he was repeatedly prosecuted for recusancy, but the high regard in which he was held by his Protestant neighbours allowed him to escape the rigours of the Penal Laws. In 1613 the justices of the peace for Northamptonshire remarked, almost in passing, that only their esteem for Sir Thomas had enabled him and fourteen members of his family to escape a conviction for recusancy for so long. This tolerant attitude to Brudenell's religion is especially significant in that his brother-in-law Francis Tresham had been a prime mover in the Gunpowder Plot eight years before the justices made their remarks. A summary of Tresham's deathbed confession to his part in the Plot, and an account of his last hours written by his secretary William Vavasour, passed to Brudenell, and lay unnoticed in the muniment room at Deene Park for 300 years.

In 1628 he was elevated to the peerage as Baron Brudenell, of Stonton in the County of Leicester. He fought on the Royalist side in the Civil War and was imprisoned in the Tower of London. Following the Restoration, he was created Earl of Cardigan in 1661.

The raising of Brudenell to an earldom was done by Charles II personally on 20 April 1661, a couple of days before Charles's coronation on the 23rd. The ennoblement of new peers followed the installation of Knights of the Garter at Windsor Castle and Knights of the Bath at the Palace of Westminster. The ceremony, at Banqueting House, involved Charles investing the newly created earl with a mantle, a sword and belt, and a cap and coronet. Brudenell's mantle was borne by the Earl of Scarsdale, his sword by the Earl of Peterborough, and his coronet by the Earl Rivers. His supporters were the Earl of Shrewsbury and the Earl of Clare. After the earls, Charles invested the new barons.

Lord Cardigan married Mary Tresham, daughter of Sir Thomas Tresham of Rushton, Northamptonshire and Muriel Throckmorton, and sister of Francis Tresham, one of the ringleaders of the Gunpowder Plot. They had at least two children, a son Robert, and a daughter Mary, who married firstly John Constable, 2nd Viscount of Dunbar (died 1668), and secondly John Dalton. He died in 1663 and was succeeded in the earldom by his son, Robert. The Countess of Cardigan died in October 1664.

Baronetage of England
New creation	Baronet (of Deene); 1611–1663	Succeeded by Robert Brudenell
Peerage of England
New creation	Earl of Cardigan; 1661–1663	Succeeded by Robert Brudenell
New creation	Baron Brudenell; 1628–1663	Succeeded by Robert Brudenell
