= James Brudenell, 5th Earl of Cardigan =

British courtier and politician

The Right Honourable The Earl of Cardigan
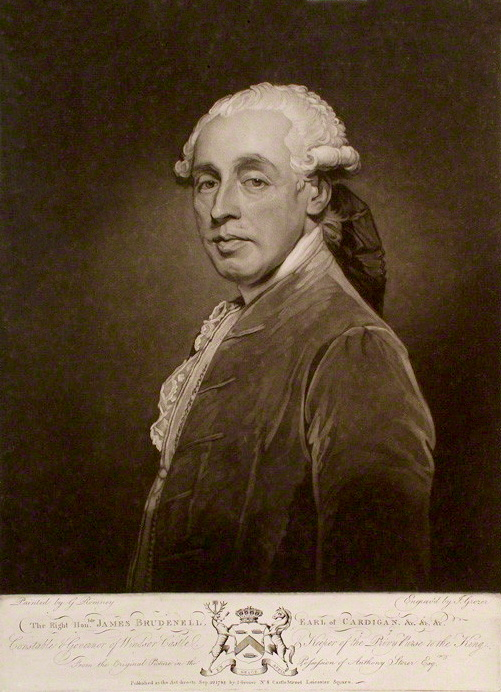
- The Earl of Cardigan

Keeper of the Privy Purse
- In office 1773–1812
- Monarch: George III
- Preceded by: Sir William Breton
- Succeeded by: John McMahon

Personal details
- Born: 20 April 1725 London, England
- Died: 24 February 1811 (aged 85) Grosvenor Square, Mayfair, London
- Party: Tory
- Spouse(s): (1) Hon. Anne Legge (died 1786) (2) Lady Elizabeth Waldegrave (1758–1823)
- Parent(s): George Brudenell, 3rd Earl of Cardigan; Lady Elizabeth Bruce
- Education: Oriel College, Oxford

James Brudenell, 5th Earl of Cardigan (20 April 1725 – 24 February 1811), styled The Honourable James Brudenell until 1780 and known as The Lord Brudenell between 1780 and 1790, was a British courtier and politician who sat in the House of Commons from 1754 to 1780, when he was raised to the peerage as Baron Brudenell.

== Background and education ==
Brudenell was born in London, England, the second son of George Brudenell, 3rd Earl of Cardigan, by Lady Elizabeth Bruce, daughter of Thomas Bruce, 3rd Earl of Elgin. He was the brother of George Montagu, 1st Duke of Montagu, the Honourable Robert Brudenell and Thomas Brudenell-Bruce, 1st Earl of Ailesbury. He was educated at Winchester College, Hampshire and matriculated at Oriel College, Oxford, from where he graduated in 1747 with a Bachelor of Arts degree.

== Public life ==
Brudenell was Member of Parliament for Shaftesbury from 1754 to 1761, for Hastings from 1761 to 1768, for Great Bedwyn from March to November 1768 and for Marlborough 1768 to 1780. He served as Deputy Cofferer of the Household from 1755 to 1760, as Master of Robes to the Prince of Wales from 1758 to 1760, who acceded as King George III, and as Keeper of the Privy Purse from 1760 to 1811.

In 1780, he was raised to the peerage as Baron Brudenell, of Deene in the County of Northampton. Ten years later he inherited the earldom of Cardigan from his brother, George Montagu, 1st Duke of Montagu, the 4th Earl of Cardigan. In 1791 he was appointed Constable and Governor of Windsor Castle (succeeding his brother the Duke of Montagu), a post he held until his death.

== Personal life ==
Lord Cardigan married the Honourable Anne Legge, daughter of George Legge, Viscount Lewisham (c. 1704 – 1732), in 1760. After her death in November 1786 he married secondly, aged 76, the 32-year-old Lady Elizabeth Waldegrave, daughter of John Waldegrave, 3rd Earl Waldegrave, in 1791. Both marriages were childless. He died at Grosvenor Square, Mayfair, London, in February 1811, aged 85. The barony of Brudenell created for him in 1780 died with him. The remaining titles passed to his nephew, Robert Brudenell, 6th Earl of Cardigan, son of Robert Brudenell. The Countess of Cardigan died at Seymour Place, Mayfair, London, in June 1823, aged 65.

Parliament of Great Britain
| Preceded by Cuthbert Ellison; William Beckford | Member of Parliament for Shaftesbury; 1754–1761; With: Sir Thomas Clavering, Bt | Succeeded by Sir Gilbert Heathcote, Bt; Samuel Touchet |
| Preceded by Andrew Stone; James Pelham | Member of Parliament for Hastings; 1761–1768; With: William Ashburnham | Succeeded by Samuel Martin; William Ashburnham |
| Preceded by Sir Thomas Fludyer; William Burke | Member of Parliament for Great Bedwyn; March 1768–November 1768; With: Hon. Robert Brudenell 1768; William Burke 1768 | Succeeded by William Northey; William Burke |
| Preceded by Sir James Tylney-Long, Bt; Hon. Robert Brudenell | Member of Parliament for Marlborough; 1768–1780; With: Sir James Tylney-Long, Bt | Succeeded by The Earl of Courtown; William Woodley |
Court offices
| Preceded by Edward Finch | Master of the Robes; 1760–1791 | Succeeded by Sir James Peachey, Bt |
| Preceded by Sir William Breton | Keeper of the Privy Purse; 1773–1812 | Succeeded by John McMahon |
Honorary titles
| Preceded by The Duke of Montagu | Constable and Governor of Windsor Castle; 1791–1811 | Succeeded by The Earl of Harrington |
Peerage of Great Britain
| New creation | Baron Brudenell; 1780–1811 | Extinct |
Peerage of England
| Preceded by George Montagu | Earl of Cardigan; 1790–1811 | Succeeded by Robert Brudenell |
