= Edward Bruce, 10th Earl of Elgin =

British noble

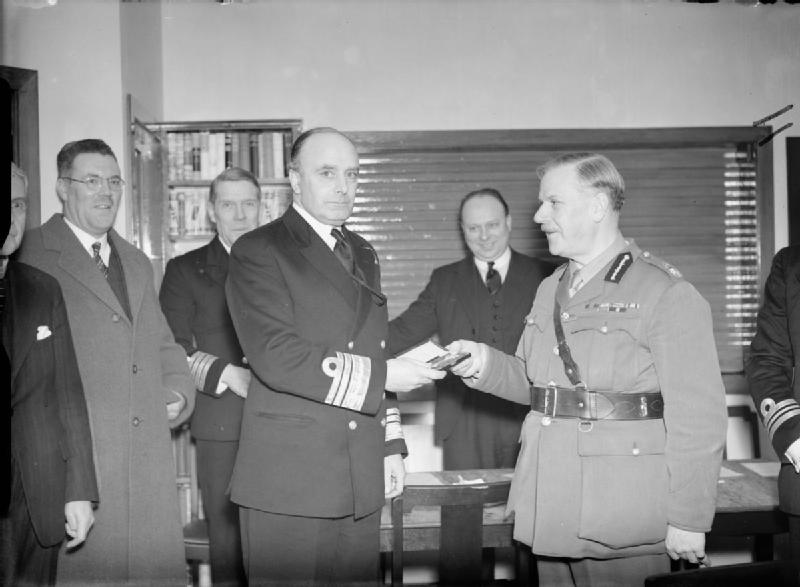
Bruce, the Lord Lieutenant of the county, presenting the golden key to the Commander-in-Chief, Vice Admiral Sir Charles Gordon Ramsey, KCB, after the opening of the British Sailors Society Hostel, Rosyth, Fife.

Edward James Bruce, 10th Earl of Elgin, 14th Earl of Kincardine, KT, CMG, TD, CD, JP (9 June 1881 – 27 November 1968) was a Scottish nobleman and soldier. He was the eldest son of Victor Bruce, 9th Earl of Elgin and Lady Constance Carnegie. He was Assistant Private Secretary to the Secretary of State for the Colonies (1908–11) and a director of the Royal Bank of Scotland.

== Career ==
Coats of arms of Edward Bruce

He had been a captain in the Forfar and Kincardine Royal Garrison Artillery (Militia), and when the Territorial Force was created in 1908, he became commanding officer of the Highland (Fifeshire) Heavy Battery, RGA, with the rank of major, a position that he held at the outbreak of World War I. He served in the war, attaining the rank of lieutenant-colonel, and was mentioned in dispatches twice. In 1918–19, he was assistant director of Labour and a temporary colonel and Labour commandant. After the war, he received the CMG.

== Career ==
He was made a Knight of the Thistle (Scotland's premier order of chivalry) on 3 June 1933. He also held the Order of Polonia Restituta.

After the formation of the Scottish Home Guard in January 1941, Bruce was made commander of No. 3 Zone (Fife & Kinross-shire), South Highland Area. He held this appointment until the end of the war.

As a colonel in the Territorial Reserve, Bruce held a number of honorary colonelcies in the Territorial Army and Canadian Militia:

- City of Edinburgh (Fortress) Royal Engineers (TA).
- Elgin Regiment (RCAC), Canadian Permanent Militia, appointed 23 November 1938.
- 71st (Forth) Heavy Anti-Aircraft Regiment, Royal Artillery (TA) and its successor, the 371st (Mixed) Heavy Anti-Aircraft Regiment (Forth), RA (TA), appointed 28 January 1939.
- 357th Medium Regiment (Lothians), RA (TA)
- No 948 Balloon Squadron, Royal Auxiliary Air Force (Honorary Air Commodore)

On October 29, 1958, during the dedication of the California Masonic Memorial Temple at 1111 California Street in San Francisco, Bruce, then senior past grand master of the Grand Lodge of Scotland, presented on its behalf a gift of a marshal's baton made of Scottish Oak to the Grand Lodge of California F.&A.M. California Grand Marshal John T. Bond used this baton for the first time to escort Bruce back to his seat. That same baton has been used each year by successive Grand Marshals to lead the ceremonial opening of the Grand Lodge of California before over a thousand attendees. Each year, California Grand Marshals are also given exact reproductions of the baton, for use at functions outside the Grand Lodge building and as a memento of their service, along with a history and symbolism of Bruce's presentation.

He was also lieutenant of the Royal Company of Archers, the Queen's Bodyguard for Scotland.

== Personal life ==
On 5 January 1921, he married the Hon. Katherine Cochrane, daughter of Lt.-Col. Thomas Cochrane, 1st Baron Cochrane of Cults and Lady Gertrude Boyle. In 1938, his wife was appointed a Dame Commander of the Order of the British Empire (DBE).

The couple had six children:

- Lady Martha Veronica Bruce OBE (7 November 1921 – 22 January 2023), who became the governor of Greenock and Cornton Vale prisons
- Lady Jean Christian Bruce (born 12 January 1923)
- Andrew Bruce, 11th Earl of Elgin (born 17 February 1924)
- Hon. James Michael Edward Bruce (26 August 1927 – 22 April 2013)
- Lady Alison Margaret Bruce (born 17 October 1931)
- Hon. Edward David Bruce (born 29 February 1936)

In 1964, he commissioned a statue of Robert the Bruce.

He died at the age of 87 in 1968.

Honorary titles
| Preceded by Sir Ralph Anstruther, Bt | Lord Lieutenant of Fife; 1935 – 1965 | Succeeded by John McWilliam |
Masonic offices
| Preceded by The Earl of Eglinton | Grand Master of the Grand Lodge of Scotland; 1921 – 1924 | Succeeded by The Earl of Stair |
Peerage of Scotland
| Preceded by Victor Bruce | Earl of Elgin; 1917 – 1968 | Succeeded by Andrew Bruce |
| Preceded by Victor Bruce | Earl of Kincardine; 1917 – 1968 | Succeeded by Andrew Bruce |
