= George Brudenell, 3rd Earl of Cardigan =

British peer

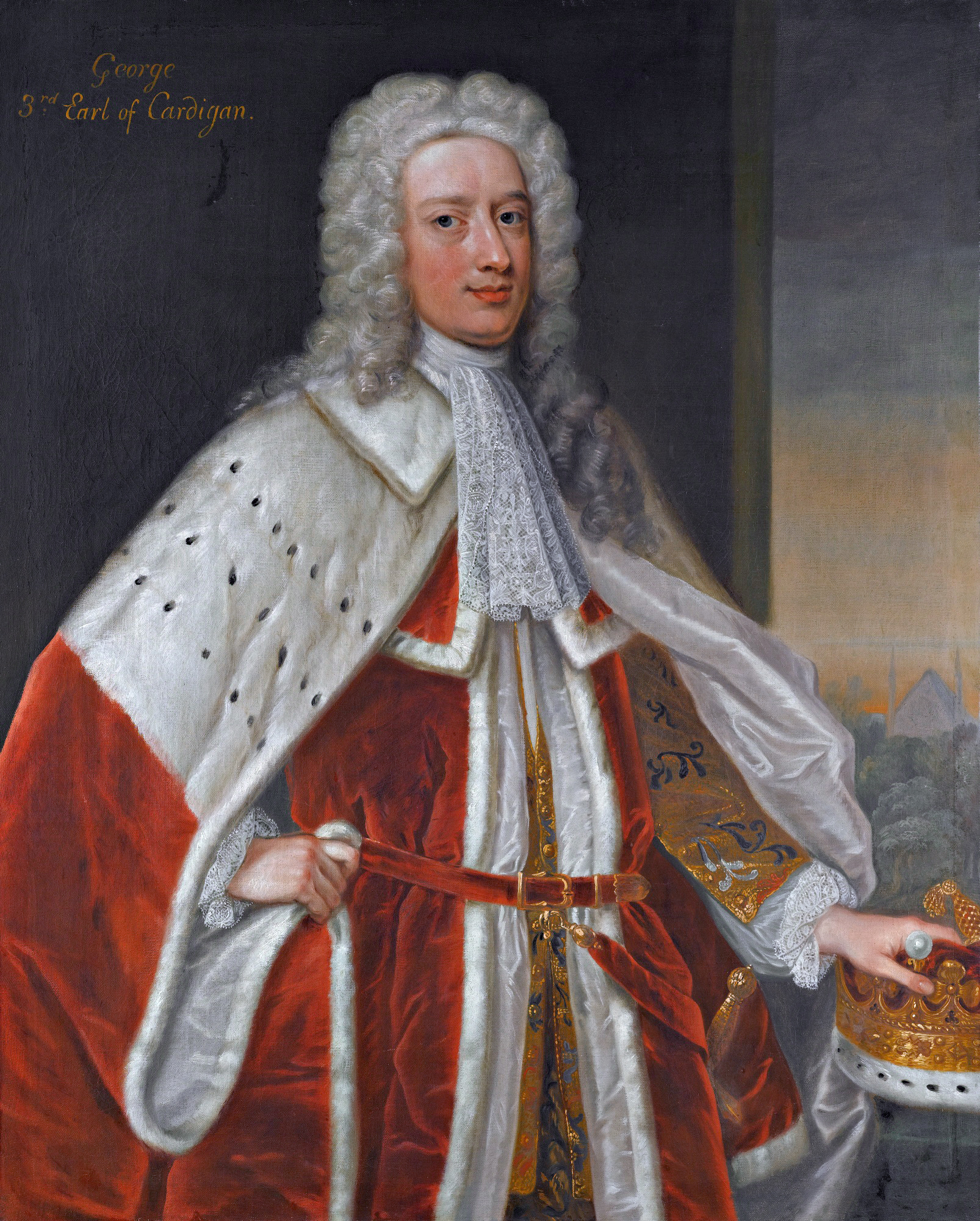
George, 3rd earl of Cardigan (attributed to Enoch Seeman)

George Brudenell, 3rd Earl of Cardigan (29 September 1685 – 5 July 1732), styled Lord Brudenell between 1698 and 1703, was a British peer.

== Origins ==
He was the son of Francis Brudenell, Lord Brudenell, son and heir of Robert Brudenell, 2nd Earl of Cardigan. His mother was Lady Frances Savile, granddaughter of Thomas Savile, 1st Earl of Sussex.

== Career ==
In 1703 he succeeded his grandfather in the earldom. In January 1709 he officially renounced his Roman Catholic faith (the Brudenells had been Catholic for generations) in order to take his seat in the House of Lords. In 1712 he was appointed Master of the Buckhounds, a post he held until 1715.

== Marriage and children ==
In 1703 he married Lady Elizabeth Bruce (1689-December 1745), a daughter of Thomas Bruce, 2nd Earl of Ailesbury, 3rd Earl of Elgin, by whom he had several children including:

- George Montagu, 1st Duke of Montagu, 4th Earl of Cardigan, who was created Duke of Montagu in 1766;
- James Brudenell, 5th Earl of Cardigan;
- Mary Brudenell, wife of Richard Powys MP, parents of Elizabeth Powys, Viscountess Sydney;
- Robert Brudenell;
- Thomas Brudenell-Bruce, 1st Earl of Ailesbury, who succeeded to the Bruce estates and was created Earl of Ailesbury in 1776.

== Death ==
He died in July 1732 and was succeeded by his eldest son George Montagu, 1st Duke of Montagu, 4th Earl of Cardigan.

Political offices
Preceded by Sir William Wyndham, Bt	Master of the Buckhounds; 1712–1715	Vacant Title next held by Francis Negus
Peerage of England
Preceded by Robert Brudenell	Earl of Cardigan; 1703–1732	Succeeded by George Brudenell, later Montagu
