= Victor Bruce, 9th Earl of Elgin =

British noble, 9th Earl of Elgin, 13th Earl of Kincardine (1849–1917)

His Excellency The Right Honourable The Earl of Elgin KG GCSI GCIE PC
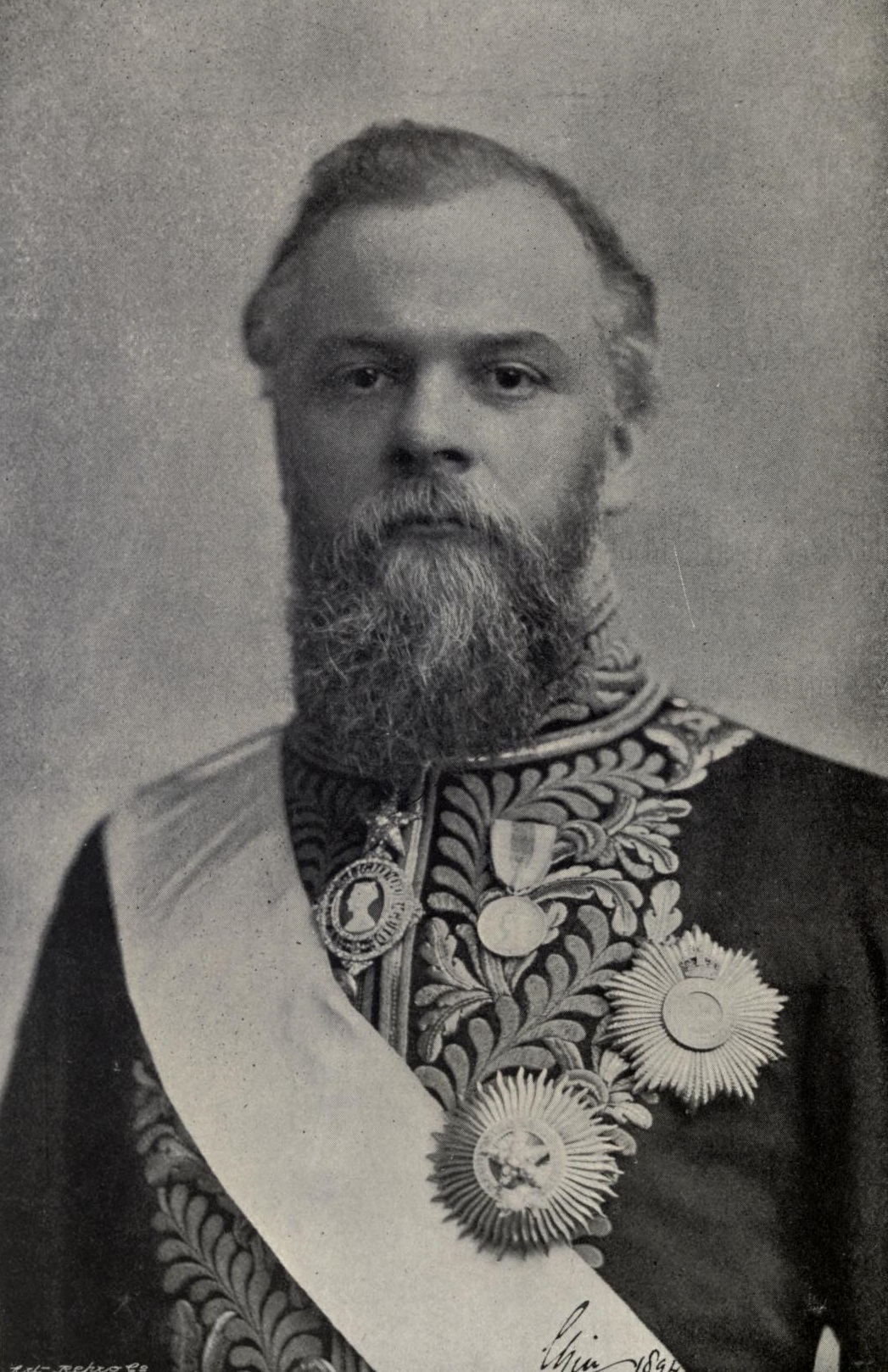
- Victor Bruce, c. 1897

Viceroy and Governor-General of India
- In office 11 October 1894 – 6 January 1899
- Monarch: Victoria
- Preceded by: The Marquess of Lansdowne
- Succeeded by: The Lord Curzon of Kedleston

Secretary of State for the Colonies
- In office 10 December 1905 – 12 April 1908
- Monarch: Edward VII
- Prime Minister: Henry Campbell-Bannerman
- Preceded by: Alfred Lyttelton
- Succeeded by: The Earl of Crewe

Personal details
- Born: 16 May 1849 Montreal, Canada East, Province of Canada
- Died: 18 January 1917 (aged 67) Dunfermline, Fife, United Kingdom
- Party: Liberal
- Spouse: Lady Constance Carnegie (m. 1876; died 1909) Gertrude Sherbrooke (m. 1913)
- Children: 12, including Edward
- Parent(s): James Bruce, 8th Earl of Elgin; Lady Mary Louisa Lambton
- Education: Balliol College, Oxford

Victor Alexander Bruce, 9th Earl of Elgin, 13th Earl of Kincardine (16 May 1849 – 18 January 1917), known as Lord Bruce until 1863, was a British Earl and politician. Elgin served as Viceroy of India from 1894 to 1899.

Elgin was appointed by Prime Minister Arthur Balfour to hold an investigative enquiry into the conduct of the Boer War in 1902 to 1903. The Elgin Commission was the first of its kind in the British Empire, and it travelled to South Africa and took oral evidence from men who had actually fought in the battles. It was the first to value the lives of the dead and to consider the feelings of mourning relatives left behind, and it was the first occasion in the history of the British Army that recognised the testimony of ordinary soldiery as well as that of the officers.

== Background and education ==
Elgin was born 16 May 1849 in Montreal, Canada East (now Montreal, Quebec), the son of James Bruce, 8th Earl of Elgin, who served as Governor General of Canada at the time, and his wife, Lady May Louisa, daughter of John Lambton, 1st Earl of Durham.

He was educated at Glenalmond, Eton and Balliol College, Oxford (graduating in 1873 with a B.A.). He owned 2,895 acres of land.

== Political career ==
By 1876, Elgin was serving as Deputy Lieutenant and as a magistrate for Fife.

Succeeding his father to the Earldom in 1863, Elgin entered politics as a Liberal Lord, serving as Treasurer of the Household and as First Commissioner of Works under William Ewart Gladstone in 1886. In 1886, he was also appointed as Lord-lieutenant of Fife.

=== Viceroy of India ===
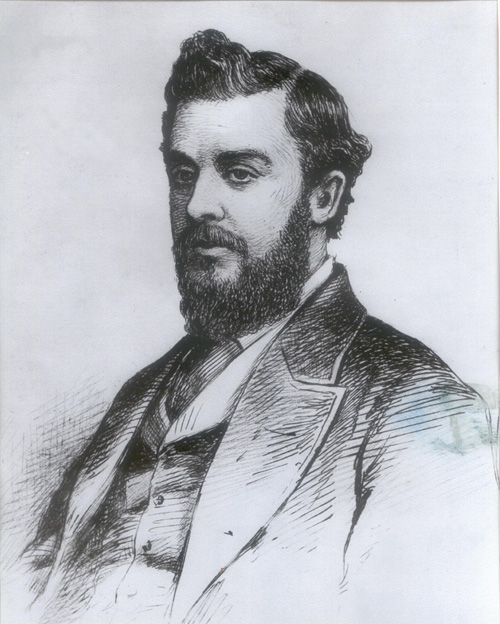
Lord Elgin.

Coats of Arms of Victor Bruce.

Following in his father's footsteps, Elgin was made Viceroy of India in 1894. His viceroyalty was not a particularly notable one. Elgin himself did not enjoy the pomp and ceremony associated with the viceroyalty, and his conservative instincts were not well suited to a time of economic and social unrest. He said, "India is the pivot of our Empire... If the Empire loses any other part of its Dominion we can survive, but if we lose India, the sun of our Empire will have set."

During his time as Viceroy, the Indian famine of 1896–1897 occurred. While caused by drought, the famine occurred mostly in areas under British control, in which Elgin reportedly admitted that up to 4.5 million people died. Other estimates have put the death toll at 11 million people.

His administration in India was otherwise notable for the Afridi frontier risings of 1897–1898.

=== Elgin Commission ===
Elgin returned to England in 1899 and was made a Knight of the Garter. From 1902 to 1903, Elgin was made chairman of the commission that investigated the conduct of the Second Boer War. He was appointed Honorary Colonel of the 1st Fifeshire Volunteer Artillery Corps on 26 March 1902.

The Elgin Committee discussed cavalry in spring 1903. Many mounted infantry units had been raised during the Boer War, some from scratch and some by converting infantry units. All were agreed that cavalry should be trained to fight dismounted with firearms, but traditionalists wanted cavalry still to be trained as the arme blanche, charging with lance and sabre. Although the traditional view appears absurd with hindsight, at the time matters were less clearcut. General French stressed the importance of morale, after the success of his cavalry charges at Elandslaagte and Kimberley. That view was by no means extreme: Maj-Gen J.P. Brabazon thought sword and lance were suitable only for "Latin" cavalry, and that "Anglo-Saxons" should instead be equipped with "a light battleaxe or tomahawk". After Wolseley, Evelyn Wood and Roberts (all of whom had seen the future of cavalry as being for use as mounted infantry only) had retired, the traditional view was reestablished as French and his protégé Major-General Haig rose to the top of the Army. The recommendations of the Commission were never fully implemented. The Esher Report into the future of the Army overshadowed its findings, and the Army came to be dominated by the High Tory reorganisation of the War Office.

=== Colonial Secretary ===
When the Liberals returned to power in 1905, Elgin became Secretary of State for the Colonies (with Winston Churchill as his Under-Secretary). As colonial secretary, he pursued a conservative policy and opposed the generous settlement of the South African question proposed by Prime Minister Campbell-Bannerman, which was enacted more in spite of the Colonial Secretary's opposition than because of his efforts. After being dropped from the next government by the next prime minister, Asquith, Elgin retired from public life in 1908.

== Honours ==
Lord Elgin was appointed Knight Grand Commander of the Order of the Star of India (GCSI) and Knight Grand Commander of the Order of the Indian Empire (GCIE) on his appointment as Viceroy in 1894. He was appointed a Knight of the Order of the Garter (KG) on his return to the United Kingdom in 1899.

In July 1902, he received the freedom of the city of St Andrews "in recognition of his devotion to the public service, whether holding the exalted position of Viceroy of India, where he watched over the interests of a vast Empire with remarkable skill, prudence, and success, or discharging the duties connected with county government and giving his time and wide experience as Chairman of the Carnegie Trust for the advancement of education in Scotland".

== Family ==
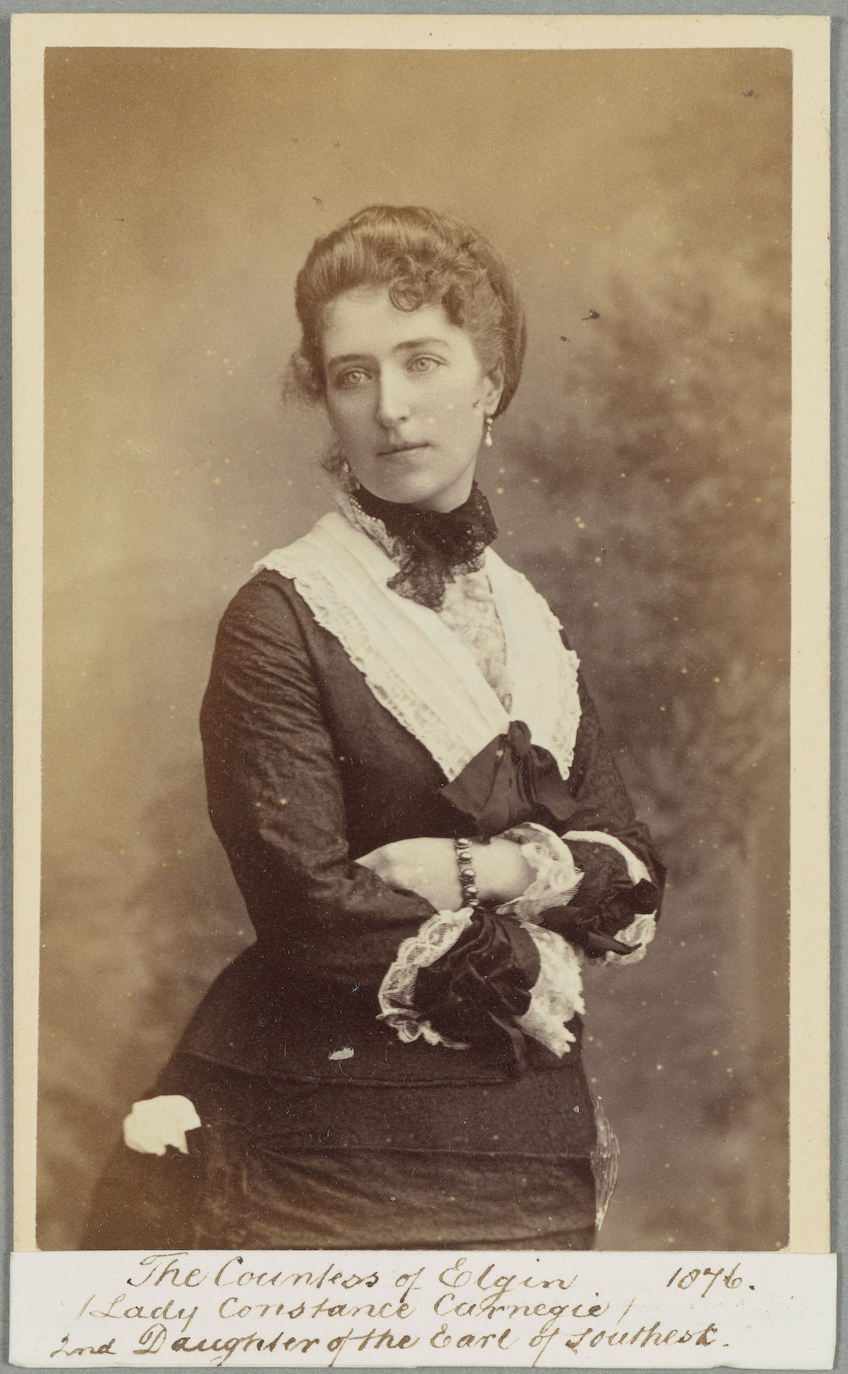
Constance, Countess of Elgin (1876), daughter of Sir James Carnegie, 9th Earl of Southesk

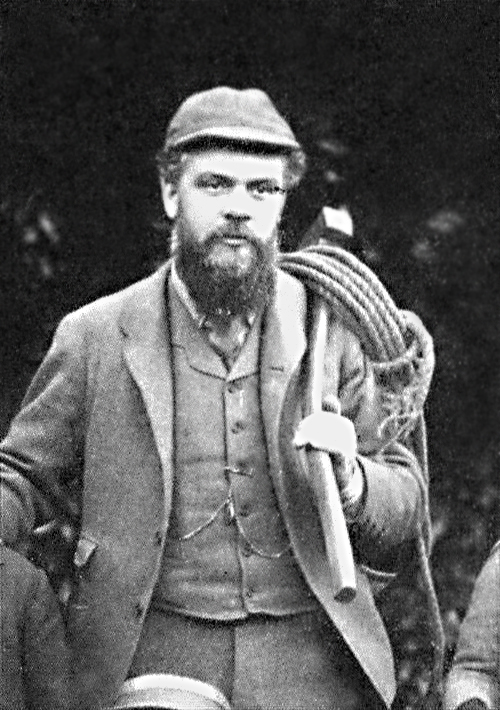
The Earl of Elgin at his private estate in Scotland, 1889.

Lord Elgin married Lady Constance Mary Carnegie, daughter of James Carnegie, 9th Earl of Southesk, in 1876. They had six sons and five daughters:

- Lady Elizabeth Mary Bruce (11 September 1877 – 13 May 1944)
- Lady Christina Augusta Bruce (25 January 1879 – 12 September 1940)
- Lady Constance Veronica Bruce (24 February 1880 – 7 July 1969)
- Edward James Bruce, 10th Earl of Elgin, 14th Earl of Kincardine (9 June 1881 – 27 November 1968)
- Hon. Robert Bruce (18 November 1882 – 31 October 1959)
- Hon. Alexander Bruce (29 July 1884 – October 1917)
- Lady Marjorie Bruce (12 December 1885 – 23 May 1901)
- Colonel Hon. David Bruce (11 June 1888 – 26 August 1964)
- Lady Rachel Catherine Bruce (23 February 1890 – 17 December 1964)
- Captain Hon. John Bernard Bruce (9 April 1892 – 3 August 1971), grandfather of Alastair Bruce of Crionaich.
- Hon. Victor Alexander Bruce (13 February 1897 – 19 December 1930).

After Lady Elgin's death in 1909, he married Gertrude Lilian, daughter of William Sherbrooke and widow of Frederick Charles Ashley Ogilvy, in 1913. They had one posthumous son:

- Hon. Bernard Bruce (12 June 1917 – 17 June 1983)

== Death ==
Lord Elgin died at the family estate in Dunfermline in January 1917, at 67. He was succeeded in his titles by his eldest son from his first marriage, Edward.

His widow, Gertrude, later remarried and died in February 1971.

== Kincardine whisky ==
Kincardine whisky was released in November 2016 by Fusion Whisky Ltd, in partnership with independent bottler and distillery Adelphi. It was made to honour his achievements, particularly his time in India when he served as Viceroy and Governor-Consul. It featured photography from the Bruce family's archive. The managing director and master blender of Adelphi is Alex Bruce, who is the great-grandson of Victor Bruce.

The Kincardine was a blend, or fusion, of seven-year-old India single malt whisky from Amrut distillery in Bangalore and mature single malt Scotch whisky from Glen Elgin and Macallan distilleries in Speyside. Only 800 bottles were produced, with a price of about £135 and ABV of 52.9%. It was the fourth international blend from Fusion Whisky and followed from the highly acclaimed Glover whiskies.

== See also ==
- Famine in India

Political offices
Preceded by Viscount Folkestone	Treasurer of the Household; 1886	Succeeded by Viscount Folkestone
Preceded by Albert Morley	First Commissioner of Works; 1886	Succeeded by David Plunkett
Preceded by Alfred Lyttelton	Secretary of State for the Colonies; 1905–1908	Succeeded by The Earl of Crewe
Government offices
Preceded by The Marquess of Lansdowne	Viceroy of India; 1894–1899	Succeeded by The Lord Curzon of Kedleston
Academic offices
Preceded by The Lord Strathcona and Mount Royal	Chancellor of the University of Aberdeen; 1914–1917	Succeeded by The Duke of Richmond and Gordon
Honorary titles
Preceded by Sir Robert Anstruther	Lord Lieutenant of Fife; 1886–1917	Succeeded by Sir William Robertson
Peerage of Scotland
Preceded by James Bruce	Earl of Elgin; Earl of Kincardine; 1863–1917	Succeeded by Edward James Bruce
