= Alexander Bruce, 2nd Earl of Kincardine =

Scottish inventor, politician, judge and freemason

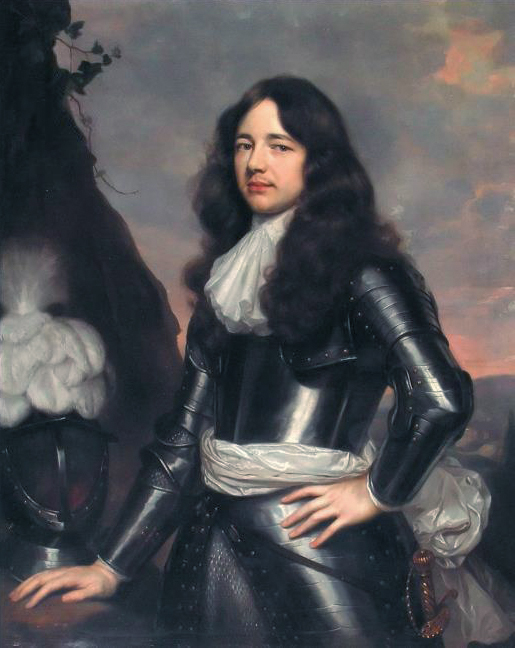
Alexander Bruce (1629–1680) (Johannes Mijtens, 1660–1670)

Alexander Bruce, 2nd Earl of Kincardine, FRS (1629–1681) was a Scottish inventor, politician, judge and freemason, who collaborated with Christiaan Huygens in developing a marine pendulum clock.

His grandfather, Sir George Bruce had built up a fortune in coal-mining and salt-production, building Culross Palace in Fife in 1597.

During the English Civil War he served as a captain with the Royalist cavalry, fighting at the Battle of Worcester. He was a probably a participant in Glencairn's uprising, after which he was briefly imprisoned. For the latter part of Cromwell's Commonwealth he lived in Bremen in voluntary exile. He was a close supporter of Charles II.

In 1659 he married Veronica, a sister of Cornelis van Aerssen van Sommelsdijck and delivered stone for the construction of the townhall of Amsterdam. He returned to Scotland once Charles II was restored to the English throne. He inherited the family estates in Culross on the death of his brother in 1662, although had been managing them for some time before that due to his brother's incapacity. He resumed mining activities at Culross Colliery sinking the Ding Dong Pit and probably the Valleyfield Moat Pit. He was granted a 21-year monopoly for the export of stone from Scotland in 1662.

On 20 June 1667 Bruce is listed as a Treasurer of Scotland. In the same year he was an Extraordinary Lord of Session.

Bruce was one those making up the 1660 committee of 12 that led to formation of the Royal Society of London, and he conducted extensive correspondence with fellow freemason Sir Robert Moray. These letters are the main source of biographical information on Bruce.

== See also ==
- Sir William Bruce, 1st Baronet, of Balcaskie, Alexander's cousin and business partner

Peerage of Scotland
| Preceded by Edward Bruce | Earl of Kincardine; 1662–1681 | Succeeded by Alexander Bruce |
