= Thomas Cotes (Royal Navy officer) =

British Royal Navy officer and MP (1712–1767)

Vice-Admiral Thomas Cotes
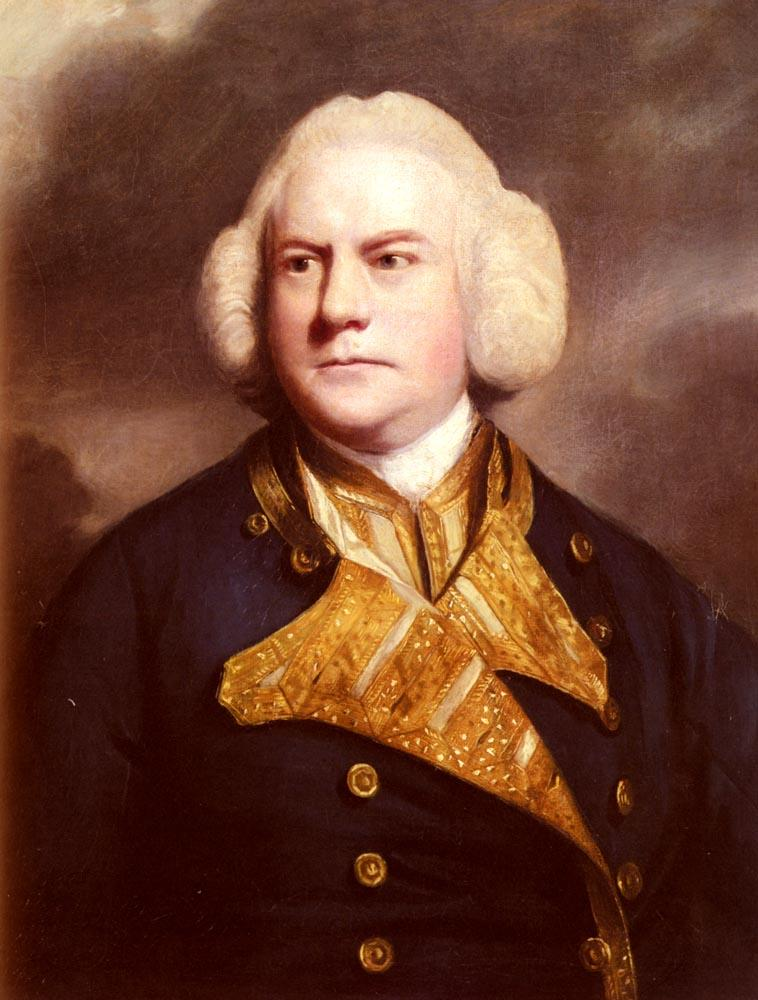
- Thomas Cotes by Joshua Reynolds
- Born: 4 June 1712
- Died: 16 July 1767 (aged 55)
- Military career
- Allegiance: Kingdom of Great Britain
- Branch: Royal Navy
- Rank: Vice-Admiral
- Commands: Jamaica Station

Vice-Admiral Thomas Cotes (4 June 1712 – 16 July 1767) was a Royal Navy officer who became Commander-in-Chief of the Jamaica Station.

== Naval career ==
Promoted to post captain in 1740, Cotes was appointed to the command of the third-rate HMS Edinburgh in 1745 and saw action at the Second Battle of Cape Finisterre in October 1747. He was promoted to rear admiral in May 1755 by virtue of his seniority on the Captain's List.

=== Seven Years' War ===
Cotes was named Commander-in-Chief of the Royal Navy's Jamaica Station in early 1757, shortly after formal declaration of the Seven Years' War against France.

The appointment followed a series of British setbacks in the Caribbean, including the French capture of two Royal Navy ships. In 1756 there were eight British vessels at the Jamaica Station, including three 60-gun ships of the line: Dreadnought, Augusta and Mary. All were in poor condition, especially Dreadnought and the fifty-year-old Mary. Cotes' predecessor, Admiral Townshend, had written to Admiralty that these three vessels were so short of serviceable cannons that they "can hardly be looked on as of equal force with our new 50-gun ships." Arrayed against them were an unknown number of French vessels, including at least two of 74 guns, along with the two captured British vessels, the 50-gun ships Warwick and Greenwich. The French fleet was based at Saint-Domingue on the island of Hispaniola, under the command of Admiral Joseph de Bauffremont.

Suspecting he was badly outnumbered, Townshend had adopted a defensive position at Jamaica and written for help from both England and from the small Royal Navy contingent in the Leeward Islands. Cotes orders were to make haste for Jamaica with the 90-gun Marlborough, two 60-gun ships, a 50-gun vessel and six frigates. On arrival he was to supersede Townshend in command of the Station, and then sail out to defeat Bauffremont's fleet.

Cotes reached Jamaica in mid 1757 to discover that Bauffremont had already departed the region for Louisbourg in Nova Scotia. What French forces remained were at anchor at Cap-Haïtien awaiting the assembling of a merchant convoy, which would then be escorted to France. A British convoy was also being assembled, comprising 150 merchantmen carrying sugar, rum and molasses. Cotes took advantage of his unexpected naval superiority by deploying his ships of the line to watch over Cap-Haïtien, while his frigates cruised for stray French commercial craft. Over the summer his frigates captured three French store ships and a military transport, along with many small French privateers. With the French thus occupied, Cotes was able to ensure the safe passage oft eh British merchant convoy, which departed in midsummer.

The French convoy had remained at Cap-Haïtien, but Cotes had received secret intelligence that it would sail in autumn. His larger vessels were in need of repair and had been returned to Jamaica; in their place Cotes ordered the readying of a three-vessel squadron comprising the 60-gun ships Augusta and Dreadnought and the 64-gun Edinburgh. He named Captain Arthur Forrest of Augusta to command, instructing him to intercept and capture the French as they left port. Forrest sailed for Cap-Haïtien to find that Cotes' intelligence had been incomplete; the convoy was ready to sail, but had been reinforced by a French squadron of five ships of the line including two of 74 guns. After a brief conference with his fellow captains, Forrest elected to attack. The ensuing battle resulted in more than 500 casualties and significant damage to vessels on both sides. No ships were taken or sunk, but both squadrons retreated to their respective ports. The French vessels were more swiftly repaired, and put to sea before Forrest could return; the merchant convoy reached France in relative safety over the winter.

Cotes was promoted to Vice-Admiral in February 1758. He served as Member of Parliament for Great Bedwyn from 1761 to 1767.

== Sources ==
- Cundall, Frank (1915). Historic Jamaica. West India Committee.
- Robson, Martin (2016). A History of the Royal Navy: The Seven Years War. London: IB Taurus. ISBN 9781780765457.

Military offices
Preceded by George Townshend	Commander-in-Chief, Jamaica Station; 1757–1760	Succeeded by Charles Holmes
Parliament of Great Britain
Preceded by Hon. Robert Brudenell; Sir Robert Hildyard	Member of Parliament for Great Bedwyn; 1761–1767; With: William Woodley; William Burke	Succeeded by Sir Thomas Fludyer; William Burke
