= Robert Brudenell, 2nd Earl of Cardigan =

English nobleman (1607–1703)

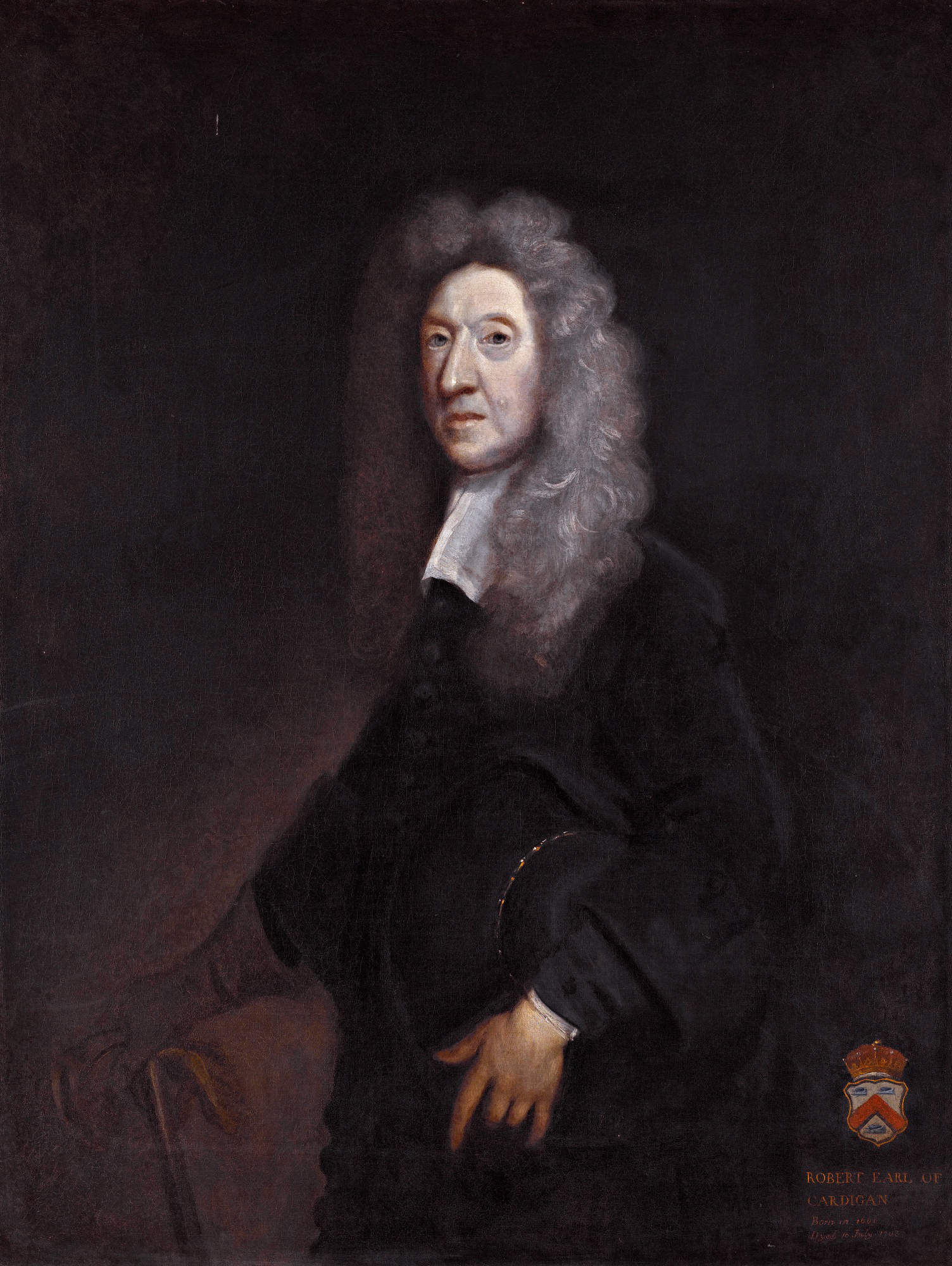
Robert Brudenell, 2nd Earl of Cardigan, (1607–1703), by Joshua Reynolds

Robert Brudenell, 2nd Earl of Cardigan, 2nd Baron Brudenell (5 March 1607 – 16 July 1703) was an English nobleman.

== Origins ==
He was born on 5 March 1607, the son of Thomas Brudenell, 1st Earl of Cardigan (c. 1583–1663) by his wife Mary Tresham, a daughter of Sir Thomas Tresham. Between 1661 and 1663 he was styled by the courtesy title Lord Brudenell, his father's subsidiary title.

== Career ==
He succeeded his father in the earldom in 1663. Like most of his family, both Brudenells and Treshams, he was an adherent of Roman Catholicism. His father's devotion to that faith was so open that he was prosecuted regularly for recusancy. In 1613 the local justices of the peace remarked that only their personal regard for the Brudenell family had saved fourteen of them, including Robert's parents, from prison. His mother's family were deeply implicated in the Gunpowder Plot.

Robert himself and his eldest son Francis, as two of the most influential members of the Catholic nobility, inevitably became the target of informers, particularly William Bedloe, during the Popish Plot: Robert retired to France for a time, while his son spent a year in prison.

== Marriages and children ==
He married twice:

- Firstly to Mary Constable, daughter of Henry Constable, 1st Viscount of Dunbar, by whom he had one daughter, Mary, who married William Hay, 4th Earl of Kinnoull; but died without issue.
- Secondly he married Anna Savage (d. June 1696), a daughter of Thomas Savage, 1st Viscount Savage of Rocksavage and Elizabeth Savage, Countess Rivers, by whom he had issue:
  - Francis Brudenell, Lord Brudenell (d. 1698), eldest son and heir apparent, who predeceased his father, having married Frances Savile, a daughter of James Savile, 2nd Earl of Sussex, by whom he had two sons and three daughters:
    - George Brudenell, 3rd Earl of Cardigan, 2nd Baron Brudenell, (1685-1732), who succeeded his grandfather in the earldom;
    - James Brudenell (died 1746);
    - Lady Mary Brudenell, who married Richard Molyneux, 5th Viscount Molyneux;
    - Lady Anne Brudenell, who married firstly Henry Belasyse, 2nd Baron Belasyse, and secondly Charles Lennox, 1st Duke of Richmond;
    - Lady Frances Brudenell, who married firstly Charles Livingston, 2nd Earl of Newburgh, and secondly, Richard Bellew, 3rd Baron Bellew.
  - Lady Anna Brudenell, who married Francis Talbot, 11th Earl of Shrewsbury.
  - Lady Catherine Brudenell, who married Charles Middleton, 2nd Earl of Middleton.

== Death ==
He died in July 1703, aged 96, and was succeeded in the earldom by his grandson George Brudenell, 3rd Earl of Cardigan.

Peerage of England
Preceded by Thomas Brudenell	Earl of Cardigan; 1663–1703	Succeeded by George Brudenell
