= James Roberton, Lord Bedlay =

James Roberton, Lord Bedlay (c. 1590 – May 1664) was a Scottish advocate and judge. He was born to Archibald Roberton of Stainhall, youngest son of John Roberton 9th Laird of Earnock, and Elizabeth Baillie, daughter of Robert Baillie of Jerviston. He inherited Bedlay Castle from his father, who bought it from James, the 8th Lord Boyd. He became Lord Bedlay upon the occasion of being raised to the judicial bench in 1661.

== Education ==
Described as a man of great learning and integrity, Roberton matriculated at the University of Glasgow in March 1605 and graduated M.A. in 1609.

== Positions ==
He was appointed Regent (Professor) of Philosophy and Humanity of the University of Glasgow in 1618. He passed as advocate and was appointed a judge of the Admiralty Court and a Justice-Deputy in 1626, a position he held without fee from 1626 to 1637. Several petitions to parliament finally resulted in back-pay and annual income in 1644. On 3 April 1646 he was chosen as rector of University of Glasgow and designated James Roberton, judex, to distinguish him from namesake James Roberton, professor of physiology.

Roberton served on Lanarkshire’s committee of war 1644 – 1648 and was commissary of Hamilton 1646 – 1650. Upon the Restoration Roberton was appointed judge and made an ordinary Lord of Session on 5 April 1661.

== Allegiances ==
During Cromwell’s Protectorate Roberton declined the Oath of Abjuration and retired. His lands were not forfeit. Upon the Restoration, Roberton never took the oath. He petitioned the court their indulgence regarding his age and sickness for his non-attendance, asserting he had no scruples with the covenant. The Court granted him the privilege of appearing whenever his health would allow.

== Family and associations ==
Roberton and his wife had three children. Their son Archibald retoured as heir on 17 June 1664. Their daughter Elizabeth married James Dunlop of Garnkirk, and their daughter Jean Dunlop married Patrick Coutts, grandfather of Coutts founders Thomas and James. Their youngest daughter Jean married John Rae of Auchingraymount. Roberton's sister Margaret married Scottish professor of divinity David Dickson.
