= Robert Brudenell, 6th Earl of Cardigan =

English peer and Member of Parliament

The Right Honourable The Earl of Cardigan

Member of Parliament for Marlborough
- In office 1801–1802 Serving with Lord Bruce
- Preceded by: Parliament of Great Britain
- Succeeded by: James Henry Leigh; Lord Bruce
- In office 1797–1801 Serving with Lord Bruce
- Preceded by: Hon. James Bruce; Lord Bruce
- Succeeded by: Parliament of the United Kingdom

Personal details
- Born: Robert Brudenell; 25 April 1760 Westminster
- Died: 14 August 1837 (aged 77) Marylebone
- Spouse: Penelope Cook (m. 1794; died 1826)
- Children: 10
- Parent(s): Robert Brudenell; Anne Bisshopp Brudenell
- Relatives: Sir Cecil Bisshopp, 6th Baronet (grandfather)
- Education: Harrow School

Robert Brudenell, 6th Earl of Cardigan (25 April 1760 – 14 August 1837) was an English peer and Member of Parliament.

== Early life ==
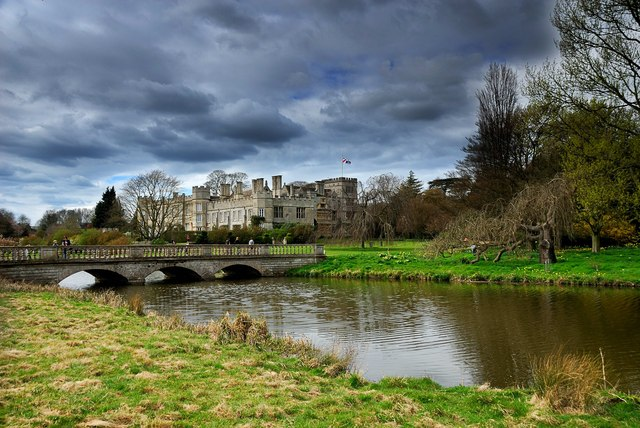
Deene Park, Northamptonshire - seat of the Brudenell family

Robert Brudenell was born in Westminster, the posthumous son and heir of Colonel the Hon. Robert Brudenell and his wife Anne, the daughter of Sir Cecil Bisshopp, 6th Baronet of Parham, Sussex. He was educated at Harrow School.

== Career ==
He was a keen cricketer who made eight known appearances in important matches between 1790 and 1793. He was an early member of Marylebone Cricket Club (MCC), for whose team he played most of his matches.

He sat as member of parliament (MP) for Marlborough in both the Parliaments of Great Britain and the United Kingdom from 1797 until 1802.

He succeeded to his title and estates on 24 February 1811, following the death of his uncle James Brudenell, 5th Earl of Cardigan.

== Personal life ==
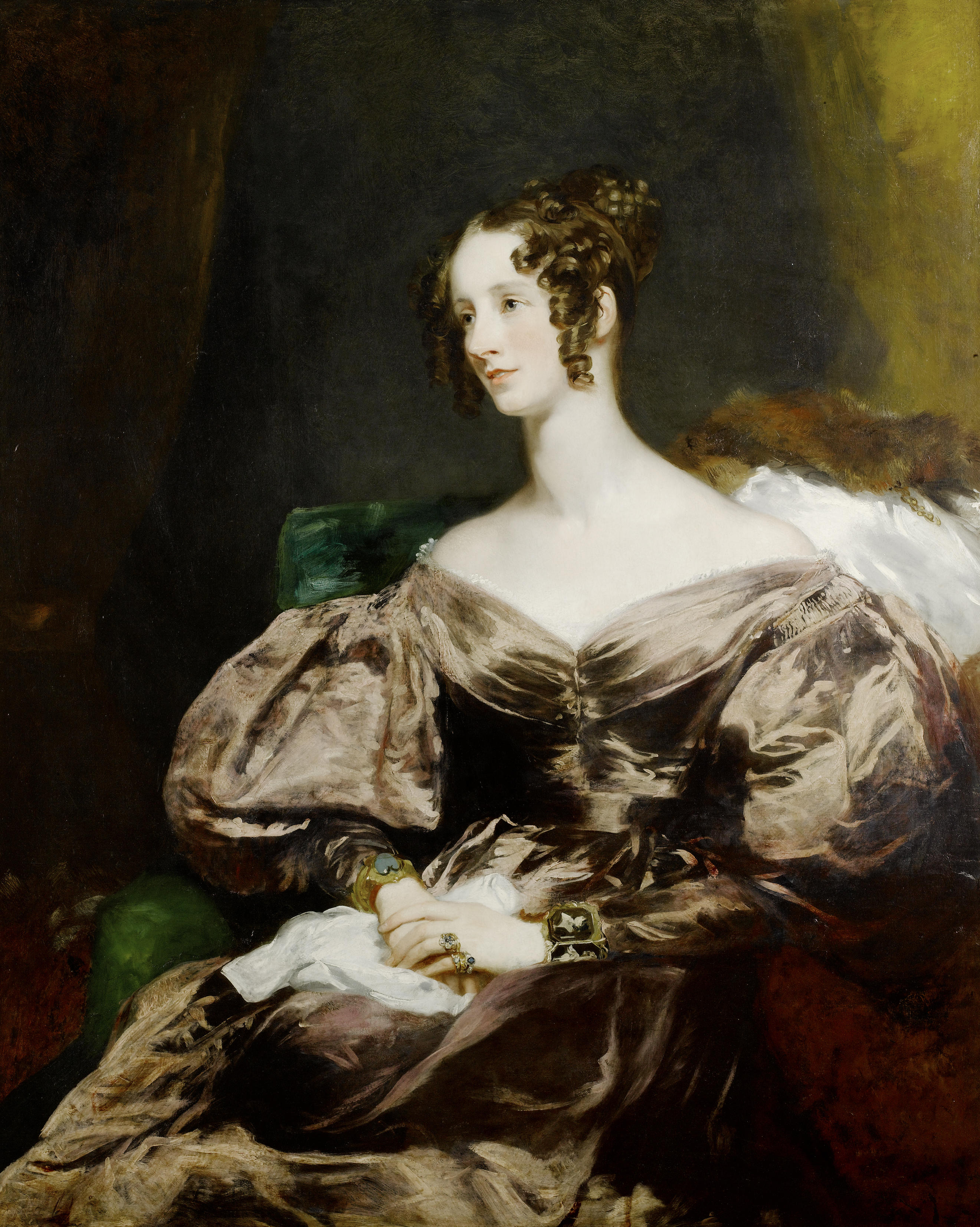
Portrait of Countess Howe by Margaret Sarah Carpenter, 1834

On 8 March 1794, Brudenell was married to Penelope Anne (née Cooke) (1770–1826), the second daughter of George John Cooke of Harefield Park and the former Penelope Bowyer (only daughter of Sir William Bowyer, 3rd Baronet). Together, they were the parents of two sons and eight daughters, including:

- 7th Earl of Cardigan (1797–1868), who succeeded his father in title and estates. He is most well known for leading the Charge of the Light Brigade as lieutenant general.
- Elizabeth Anne (1795–1824), her first John Stephen Perceval (1793–1818), the son of Charles Perceval, 2nd Baron Arden. Widowed, Elizabeth would marry on 16 March 1824 (just before her own death) William Brodrick, 7th Viscount Midleton.
- Augusta (d. 1853), who married Maj. Henry Bingham Baring (1804–1869) MP, the son of Henry Baring MP and his first wife Maria Matilda Bingham the daughter of the American statesman William Bingham.
- Harriet Georgiana (1799–1836), who married Richard Curzon-Howe, 1st Earl Howe in 1820. They had ten children before her death.
- Emma, married David Pennant (1796–1835) in 1827.
- Charlotte Penelope (d. 1879), who married MP Henry Sturt (1795–1866), in 1820.
- Mary (1806–1867), who married Henry Pelham, 3rd Earl of Chichester.
- Anne (1809–1877), who married George Bingham, 3rd Earl of Lucan in 1829. Lord Lucan was the Cavalry Division commander who gave her brother James' Light Brigade the infamous order to charge. His descendants included Diana, Princess of Wales.

The earl died at Marylebone, aged 77.

== External sources ==
- Hansard 1803–2005: contributions in Parliament by the Earl of Cardigan

Parliament of Great Britain
Preceded by Hon. James Bruce; Lord Bruce	Member of Parliament for Marlborough; 1797–1801; With: Lord Bruce	Succeeded by Parliament of the United Kingdom
Parliament of the United Kingdom
Preceded by Parliament of Great Britain	Member of Parliament for Marlborough; 1801–1802; With: Lord Bruce	Succeeded by James Henry Leigh; Lord Bruce
Peerage of England
Preceded by James Brudenell	Earl of Cardigan; 1811–1837	Succeeded by James Brudenell
