= Robert Brudenell =

British army officer and Member of Parliament

Robert Brudenell (20 September 1726 – 20 October 1768) was a British army officer and Member of Parliament.

Brudenell was the third son of the 3rd Earl of Cardigan and Elizabeth Bruce and a younger brother of the 1st Duke of Montagu and 4th Earl of Cardigan and the 5th Earl of Cardigan. He was educated at Winchester College and Oriel College, Oxford; on 27 January 1759, he married Anne Bishopp, a daughter of Sir Cecil Bishopp, 6th Baronet.

Brudenell was commissioned as Ensign in the First Foot Guards in 1748, promoted to Captain in 1751, Lieutenant-Colonel in 1758 and Colonel in 1762. In 1763 he became colonel of the 16th Regiment of Foot, a post he held until his removal to the 4th Regiment of Foot in 1765. He was also Lieutenant-Governor of Windsor Castle from 1752, and Vice-Chamberlain to Queen Charlotte from 1766 until his death.

He served as MP for Great Bedwyn from 1756 to 1761 and for Marlborough from 1761 to 1768. However, he took little interest in politics, generally supporting each successive administration so as to avoid any risk to his military advancement.

As he predeceased his childless elder brothers, Brudenell's son, Robert became the 6th Earl of Cardigan. His descendants included Diana, Princess of Wales.

Parliament of Great Britain
Preceded by Sir Robert Hildyard; William Sloper	Member of Parliament for Great Bedwyn; 1756–1761; With: Sir Robert Hildyard	Succeeded by Thomas Cotes; William Woodley
Preceded by Hon. John Ward; Sir John Cotton	Member of Parliament for Marlborough; 1761–1768; With: Lord Brudenell 1761–1762; Sir James Tylney-Long 1762–1768	Succeeded by James Brudenell; Sir James Tylney-Long
Political offices
Preceded by Viscount Cantelupe	Vice Chamberlain to Queen Charlotte; 1766–1768	Succeeded by Hon. Charles FitzRoy
Military offices
Preceded by Alexander Duroure	Colonel of the 4th (The King's Own) Regiment of Foot; 1765–1768	Succeeded by Studholme Hodgson
