= Earl of Elgin =

Title in the Peerage of Scotland

Earldom of Elgin held with Earldom of Kincardine
- Or, a saltire and chief gules on a canton argent a lion rampant azure armed and langued of the second
- Creation date: 21 June 1633
- Created by: Charles I
- Peerage: Peerage of Scotland
- First holder: Thomas Bruce, 3rd Lord Kinloss
- Present holder: Andrew Bruce, 11th Earl of Elgin
- Heir apparent: Charles Bruce, Lord Bruce
- Remainder to: Heirs male forever, bearing the name Bruce
- Subsidiary titles: Baron Elgin; Lord Bruce of Kinloss; Lord Bruce of Torry
- Seat: Broomhall House
- Motto: Fuimus ("We have been")

Earl of Elgin (/ˈɛlɡɪn/ ELG-in) is a title in the Peerage of Scotland, created in 1633 for Thomas Bruce, 3rd Lord Kinloss. He was later created Baron Bruce, of Whorlton in the County of York, in the Peerage of England on 30 July 1641. The Earl of Elgin is the hereditary Clan Chief of Clan Bruce.

== History ==
The family descended from the Bruces of Clackmannan, whose ancestor was Thomas de Bruys. According to Sir James Balfour Paul, there is no evidence that this branch of the family was descended from Robert the Bruce (King Robert I), despite claims that Thomas was an illegitimate son of the king. However, King Robert's son David II made a grant of land in 1359 to Robert Bruce referring to him as dilecto consanguineo suo (our beloved cousin). It was generally accepted that Clackmannan branch descended from John de Brus who was a younger son of Robert de Brus, 5th Lord of Annandale.

The first earl was succeeded by his son, Robert, who also was created Earl of Ailesbury in the Peerage of England. The two Earldoms continued united until the death of the fourth Earl of Elgin, when the Ailesbury and Baron Bruce (of Whorlton) titles became extinct, and the Elgin title passed to the Earl of Kincardine; the Lordship of Kinloss became dormant. Thereafter, the Earldoms of Elgin and Kincardine have remained united.

In Dublin there are roads that come from the Earl's titles. These are Elgin Road and Ailesbury Road.

The most famous Earl was the 7th Earl, who removed and transported to Britain the so-called Elgin Marbles from the Parthenon.

As well as the titles Earl of Elgin and Earl of Kincardine, Lord Elgin also holds the titles Lord Bruce of Kinloss (created 1604), Lord Bruce of Torry (1647) and Baron Elgin, of Elgin in Scotland (1849). The first two are in the Peerage of Scotland; the third is in the Peerage of the United Kingdom.

The Lordship of Kinloss held by the first four Earls was inherited on the death of the 4th Earl by the 3rd Duke of Chandos. Through his daughter it passed to the Dukes of Buckingham and Chandos, and is now held by these Dukes' heir of line.

The family seat is Broomhall House, three miles south-west of Dunfermline, Scotland.

== Feudal Barons of Clackmannan ==
- Thomas de Bruys, 1st Baron of Clackmannan (died before 1348)
- Robert de Bruys, 2nd Baron of Clackmannan (died before 1406)
- Sir Robert Bruce, 3rd Baron of Clackmannan (died 1428)
- Sir David Bruce, 4th Baron of Clackmannan
- John Bruce, 5th Baron of Clackmannan (died 1473)
- Sir David Bruce, 6th Baron of Clackmannan (died circa 1500)
- Sir David Bruce, 7th Baron of Clackmannan (died after 1556)
- Sir Edward Bruce, 8th Baron of Clackmannan (1505–1565)
  - second son, Edward, created Lord Bruce of Kinloss in 1604

== Lords Bruce of Kinloss (1604) ==
- Edward Bruce, 1st Lord Bruce of Kinloss (1548–1611)
- Edward Bruce, 2nd Lord Bruce of Kinloss (1594–1613)
- Thomas Bruce, 3rd Lord Bruce of Kinloss, 1st Baron Bruce (1599–1663) (created Earl of Elgin 1633) (created Baron Bruce of Whorlton 1641)

== Earls of Elgin (1633) ==
- Thomas Bruce, 1st Earl of Elgin, 1st Baron Bruce of Whorlton (1599–1663)
- Robert Bruce, 2nd Earl of Elgin, 1st Earl of Ailesbury, 2nd Baron Bruce of Whorlton (1627–1685)
  - Hon. Robert Bruce (died 1652)
  - Hon. Edward Bruce (died 1662)
- Thomas Bruce, 3rd Earl of Elgin, 2nd Earl of Ailesbury, 3rd Baron Bruce of Whorlton (1656–1741)
  - Robert Bruce, Lord Bruce (1679–before 1741)
- Charles Bruce, 4th Earl of Elgin, 3rd Earl of Ailesbury, 4th Baron Bruce of Whorlton, 1st Baron Bruce of Skelton (1682–1747) (created Baron Bruce of Skelton 1746)
  - Hon. Robert Bruce (died 1738)
- Charles Bruce, 5th Earl of Elgin and 9th Earl of Kincardine (1732–1771)
- William Robert Bruce, 6th Earl of Elgin and 10th Earl of Kincardine (1764–1771)
- Thomas Bruce, 7th Earl of Elgin, 11th Earl of Kincardine (1766–1841) – of the eponymous Elgin Marbles
  - George Charles Constantine Bruce, Lord Bruce (1800–1840)
- James Bruce, 8th Earl of Elgin, 12th Earl of Kincardine (1811–1863) – of the sacking of the Summer Palace. Created Baron Elgin of Elgin 1849
- Victor Alexander Bruce, 9th Earl of Elgin, 13th Earl of Kincardine (1849–1917)
- Edward James Bruce, 10th Earl of Elgin, 14th Earl of Kincardine (1881–1968)
- Andrew Douglas Alexander Thomas Bruce, 11th Earl of Elgin, 15th Earl of Kincardine (b. 1924)

The heir apparent is the present holder's son Charles Edward Bruce, Lord Bruce (b. 1961).
The heir apparent's heir apparent is his son James Andrew Charles Robert Bruce, Master of Bruce (b. 1991).

Line of succession (simplified)
- James Bruce, 8th Earl of Elgin, 12th Earl of Kincardine (1811–1863)
  - Victor Bruce, 9th Earl of Elgin, 13th Earl of Kincardine (1849–1917)
    - Edward Bruce, 10th Earl of Elgin, 14th Earl of Kincardine (1881–1968)
      - Andrew Bruce, 11th Earl of Elgin, 15th Earl of Kincardine (born 1924)
        - (1). Charles Edward Bruce, Lord Bruce (born 1961)
          - (2). Hon. James Andrew Charles Robert Bruce, Master of Bruce (born 1991)
          - (3). Hon. George Benjamin Thomas Bruce (born 1993)
          - (4). Hon. Benedict Bruce (born 2003)
        - (5). Hon. Adam Robert Bruce (born 1968)
          - (6). Robert Frederick Angelo Granito Pignatelli Bruce (born 2007)
          - (7). Orlando Antonio Andrew Granito Pignatelli Bruce (born 2008)
        - (8). Hon. Alexander Victor Bruce (born 1971)
      - Hon. James Michael Edward Bruce (1927–2013)
        - (9). John Edward Bruce (born 1958)
          - (10). George Robert Bruce (born 1998)
          - (11). Archie James Bruce (born 2000)
        - (12). Michael Andrew Bruce (born 1961)
          - (13). Alasdair James Thomas Bruce (born 1991)
          - (14). Angus William Robert Bruce (born 1996)
        - (15). Alexander James Bruce (born 1977)
          - (16). James Ranald Edward Bruce (born 2012)
        - (17). Simon Alistair Bruce (born 1979)
      - (18). Hon. Edward David Bruce (born 1936)
        - (19). Newton Edward John Bruce (born 1964)
          - (20). Jamie Peveril Bruce (born 2000)
          - (21). Arthur Edward Zachary Bruce (born 2001)
    - Hon. John Bernard Bruce (1892–1971)
      - Henry Victor Bruce of Salloch (1924–2011)
        - male issue and descendants in remainder
      - Francis Bernard Bruce (1930–2017)
        - male issue and descendants in remainder
      - other male issue and descendants in remainder
  - Hon. Frederick John Bruce (1854–1920)
    - Lewis Bruce (1880–1961)
      - Robert Richard Fernie Bruce (1915–2012)
        - Anthony James Lewis Bruce (1948–2017)
          - male issue and descendants in remainder
      - James Alexander Bruce (1919–1989)
        - male issue in remainder
    - Charles Bruce (1883–1958)
      - David Charles Richard Bruce (1928–1957)
        - male issue and descendants in remainder

== Family tree ==
Brudenell and Bruce family tree including: Earls and Marquesses of Ailesbury, Earls of Cardigan, Earls of Elgin, and Earls of Kincardine family tree

Edward Bruce of Blairhall c. 1505–1565
Lord Kinloss, 1602 Lord Bruce of Kinloss, 1604; Lord Bruce of Kinloss, 1608
Edward Bruce; 1548–1611; 1st Lord Kinloss, etc.	George Bruce of Carnock c. 1550–1625	Margaret Primrose
Earl of Elgin and Baron Bruce of Whorlton in the County of York, 1633
Edward Bruce; 1594–1613; 2nd Lord Kinloss, etc.	Thomas Bruce; 1599–1663; 1st Earl of Elgin, etc., 3rd Lord Kinloss, etc.	Mary Preston	George Bruce (2nd) of Carnock d. 1643	Robert Bruce of Broomhall d. 1652
Earl of Ailesbury (1st creation), Viscount Bruce, and Baron Bruce of Skelton, 1664	Baron Brudenell of Stonton in the County of Leicester, 1628 Earl of Cardigan, 1661	Earl of Kincardine and Lord Bruce of Torry, 1647	See also: Dukes of Montrose family tree for the a different creation of the Earl of Kincardine 1644
Robert Bruce; 1627–1685; 2nd Earl of Elgin, etc., 1st Earl of Ailesbury, etc., 4th Lord Kinloss, etc.	Thomas Brudenell c. 1583–1663; 1st Earl of Cardigan, etc.	Edward Bruce d. 1662; 1st Earl of Kincardine, etc.	Alexander Bruce c. 1629–1680; 2nd Earl of Kincardine, etc.	Alexander Bruce d. 1706; 4th Earl of Kincardine, etc.
Thomas Bruce; 1656–1741; 3rd Earl of Elgin, etc., 2nd Earl of Ailesbury, etc., 5th Lord Kinloss, etc.	Robert Brudenell; 1607–1703; 2nd Earl of Cardigan, etc.	Alexander Bruce c. 1666–1705; 3rd Earl of Kincardine, etc.	Robert Bruce d. 1718; 5th Earl of Kincardine, etc.	Alexander Bruce; 1662–1721; 6th Earl of Kincardine, etc.	Thomas Bruce; 1663–1739/1740; 7th Earl of Kincardine, etc.
Baron Bruce of Tottenham in the County of Wilts, 1746
Charles Bruce; 1682–1747; 4th Earl of Elgin, etc., 3rd Earl of Ailesbury, etc., 6th Lord Kinloss, etc., 1st Baron Bruce of Tottenham	George Brudenell; 1685–1732; 3rd Earl of Cardigan, etc.	Elizabeth Brudenell; 1689–1745	William Bruce; 1710–1740; 8th Earl of Kincardine, etc.
Earldom of Ailesbury, Viscountcy of Bruce, Whorlton Barony Bruce, Barony of Bruce of Skelton, and Lordship of Kinloss extinct, 1747
Earl of Ailesbury Buckinghamshire, Great Britain (2nd creation), 1747
George Brudenell, later Montagu; 1712–1790; Duke of Montagu, Marquess of Monthermer, 4th Earl of Cardigan, etc.	James Brudenell; 1725–1811; 5th Earl of Cardigan, etc.	Robert Brudenell; 1726–1768	Thomas Brudenell-Bruce; 1729–1814; 1st Earl of Ailesbury, 2nd Baron Bruce of Tottenham	Charles Bruce; 1732–1771; 5th Earl of Elgin, etc., 9th Earl of Kincardine, etc.
Marquess of Ailesbury, Earl Bruce of Whorlton, County of York, and Viscount Savernake of Savernake Forest, Wiltshire, 1821
Robert Brudenell; 1760–1837; 6th Earl of Cardigan, etc.	Charles Brudenell-Bruce; 1773–1856; 1st Marquess of Ailesbury, etc., 2nd Earl of Ailesbury, 3rd Baron Bruce of Tottenham	William Robert Bruce; 1764–1771; 6th Earl of Elgin, etc., 10th Earl of Kincardine, etc.	Thomas Bruce; 1766–1841; 7th Earl of Elgin, etc., 11th Earl of Kincardine, etc.
Baron Elgin of Elgin, 1849
James Brudenell🐴 1797–1868; 7th Earl of Cardigan, etc.	George Brudenell-Bruce; 1804–1878; 2nd Marquess of Ailesbury, etc., 8th Earl of Cardigan, etc., 3rd Earl of Ailesbury, 4th Baron Bruce of Tottenham	Ernest Brudenell-Bruce; 1811–1886; 3rd Marquess of Ailesbury, etc., 9th Earl of Cardigan, etc., 4th Earl of Ailesbury, 5th Baron Bruce of Tottenham	James Bruce; 1811–1863; 8th Earl of Elgin, etc., 12th Earl of Kincardine, etc., 1st Baron Elgin
George John Brudenell-Bruce; 1839–1868	Henry Brudenell-Bruce; 1842–1911; 5th Marquess of Ailesbury, etc., 11th Earl of Cardigan, etc., 6th Earl of Ailesbury, 7th Baron Bruce of Tottenham	Victor Alexander Bruce; 1849–1917; 9th Earl of Elgin, etc., 13th Earl of Kincardine, etc., 2nd Baron Elgin
George William Thomas Brudenell-Bruce; 1863–1894; 4th Marquess of Ailesbury, etc., 10th Earl of Cardigan, etc., 5th Earl of Ailesbury, 6th Baron Bruce of Tottenham	George William James Chandos Brudenell-Bruce; 1873–1961; 6th Marquess of Ailesbury, etc., 12th Earl of Cardigan, etc., 7th Earl of Ailesbury, 8th Baron Bruce of Tottenham	Edward James Bruce; 1881–1968; 10th Earl of Elgin, etc., 14th Earl of Kincardine, etc., 3rd Baron Elgin
Chandos Sydney Cedric Brudenell-Bruce; 1904–1974; 7th Marquess of Ailesbury, etc., 13th Earl of Cardigan, etc., 8th Earl of Ailesbury, 9th Baron Bruce of Tottenham
Michael Sydney Cedric Brudenell-Bruce; 1926–2024; 8th Marquess of Ailesbury, etc., 14th Earl of Cardigan, etc., 9th Earl of Ailesbury, 10th Baron Bruce of Tottenham	Andrew Douglas Alexander Thomas Bruce b. 1924; 11th Earl of Elgin, etc., 15th Earl of Kincardine, etc., 4th Baron Elgin
David Michael James Brudenell-Bruce b. 1952; 9th Marquess of Ailesbury, etc., 15th Earl of Cardigan, etc., 10th Earl of Ailesbury, 11th Baron Bruce of Tottenham	Charles Edward Bruce b. 1961 styled Lord Bruce
Heir apparent to the Earldom of Elgin and the Earldom of Kincardine
Thomas James Brudenell-Bruce b. 1982 styled Earl of Cardigan
Heir apparent to the Marquessate of Ailesbury and Earldom of Cardigan

== See also ==
- Clan Bruce
- Elgin Marbles
- Palermo Fragment
