= Archdiocese of Glasgow (disambiguation) =

The Diocese of Glasgow can refer to:

- Archdiocese of Glasgow, former Roman Catholic Archdiocese in Scotland and after one of the thirteen (after 1633 fourteen) historical dioceses of the Scottish church, one of two archdioceses
- Roman Catholic Archdiocese of Glasgow, modern Roman Catholic diocese re-established in 1878, based upon the model of the old diocese, based at St. Andrew's Metropolitan Cathedral
- Diocese of Glasgow and Galloway, Scottish episcopal created in the 18th century on the model of two earlier dioceses combined, and based at St. Mary's Cathedral, Glasgow

== See also ==
- Presbytery of Glasgow (Church of Scotland)
