= Saint Mary's, Calton =

Church in Calton, Glasgow, Scotland, UK

Coordinates: 55.8538°N 4.2270°W

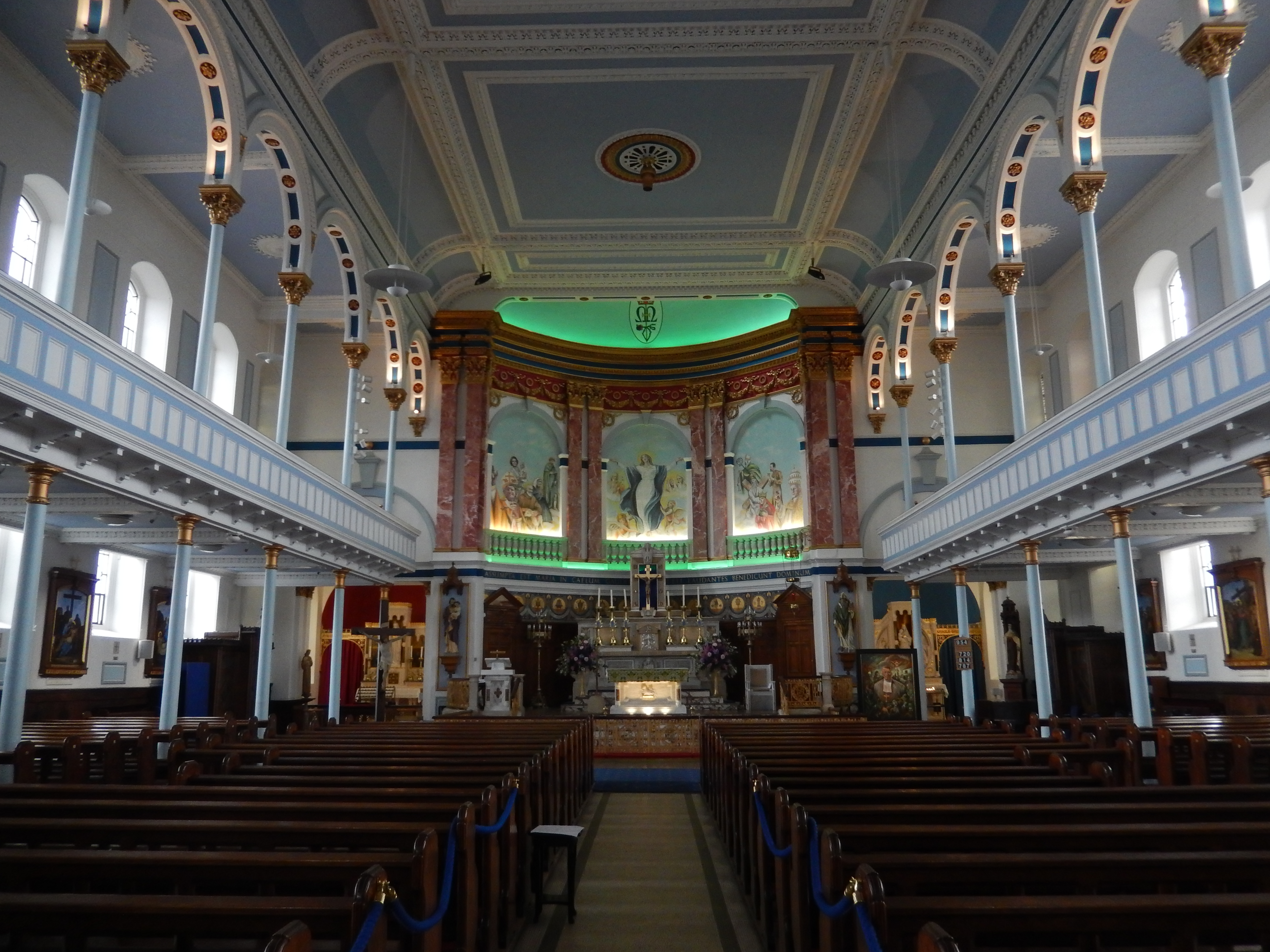
Interior of St Mary's.

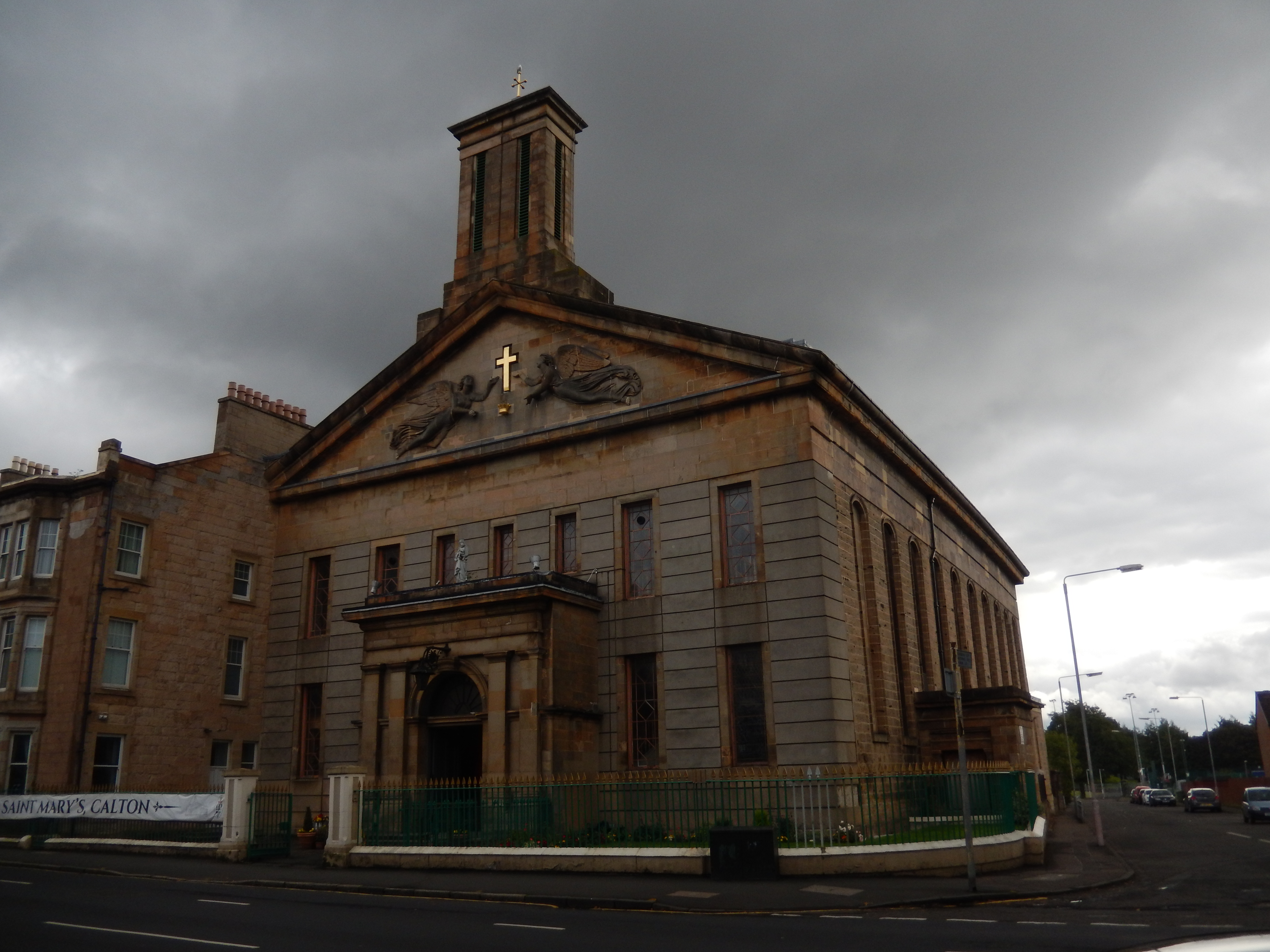
Exterior image of St Mary's.

Saint Mary's is a Catholic church in Calton, Glasgow, Scotland. It is the second oldest church in the Archdiocese of Glasgow and acted as the Pro-Cathedral of the Roman Catholic Archdiocese of Glasgow from 14 August 2009 to April 2011, during the restoration of St Andrew's Cathedral. The church building on Abercromby Street, completed in 1842, is protected as a category A listed building.

== Foundation ==
A number of parishes pre-date St Mary's (St Mary's, Greenock, and St Mirin, Paisley; both 1808, St Patrick, Dumbarton, 1830, St Margaret, Airdrie, 1836; St. John, Barrhead, St Mary, Duntocher, and St Fillan, Houston; all 1841), but of all of these only Saint Margaret's, Airdrie, still has the original church (opened 1836). Airdrie is now in the Diocese of Motherwell, hence St Mary's Calton's claim to be second oldest in the Archdiocese of Glasgow.

The church was built between 1839 and 1842 during the time of the Western District under the direction of Bishop Andrew Scott. The parish was founded, the church opened and dedicated all on 15 August 1842. Father Peter Forbes who, for the previous three years had toured Ireland fundraising for the new church building, was appointed the first parish priest from the same date. Bishop Scott was joined on the day of the dedication by Bishop John Murdoch, his co-adjutor and the titular of the church was designated as Saint Mary of the Assumption, commonly known as Saint Mary's, Calton. Father Forbes had raised £3,000 for the building (£5.4 million at 2005 prices) and so it was opened fully paid for and free of debt.

It is also where the football club Celtic F.C. was founded.

== 2004 and following renovations ==
In 2004 the building began a major renovation programme under the guidance of the Glasgow architects Page and Park. The first phase involved the back area of the church including the side-chapels and the sacristy area. The roofs were renewed, rot works carried out and repairs made to the external stonework. The stained glass in the side-chapels was restored and renewed. This phase was completed in August 2003. In 2006 the next phase took place—that of the complete renewal of the roof. This phase finished in December 2006.. The funeral of Tommy Burns took place there in 2008.

== Clergy ==
- Fr. Peter Forbes (1842–1872)
- Fr. Donald Canon Carmichael (1872–1896)
- Fr. John J. Canon Dyer (1896–1922)
- Fr. Edward Fitzgerald (1922–1942)
- Fr Peter Canon Bonnyman (1942–1948)
- Mgr Michael Canon Ward (1948–1973)
- Fr Thomas Murphy (1973–1975)
- Fr John J. O'Brien (1975–1978)
- Fr Peter Smith
- Fr. Thomas P. Canon White
