= John de Brus (died 1275) =

13th century English noble

John de Brus (died 1275), was an English knight. He was a younger son of Robert de Brus, 5th Lord of Annandale and Isabella de Clare.

He is said to be the ancestor of Thomas de Bruys of Clackmannan, whose descendants became the Earls of Elgin, Kincardine and Ailesbury.
