= James Bruce (bishop) =

- Bishop of Glasgow
- Church: Catholic Church
- Diocese: Glasgow
- Appointed: 3 February 1447
- Term ended: 1447
- Predecessor: John Cameron
- Successor: William Turnbull
- Previous post(s): Bishop of Dunkeld 1441–1447 Archdeacon of Dunkeld 1440–1441 Rector of Kilmany

Orders
- Consecration: 4 February 1442

Personal details
- Died: 1447; Edinburgh, Scotland
- Parents: Robert Bruce

James Bruce (La: Jacobus de Brois) (fl. 1441 - died 1447) was a 15th-century cleric who was bishop of Dunkeld, Chancellor of Scotland, and bishop of Glasgow.

== Biography ==
He was the son of one Robert Bruce, a middling landowner in Clackmannanshire. He was rector of Kilmany (Fife), and Archdeacon of Dunkeld. In 1441, on the death of Alexander Lawedre, bishop-elect of Dunkeld, James Bruce was elected as bishop. He was consecrated at Dunfermline on 4 February 1442. He celebrated his first festive mass on the feast of St. Adomnán, i.e. 23 September. His rule in Dunkeld came to an end when, on 3 February 1447, he was translated to the bishopric of Glasgow. His time as bishop of Glasgow was, however, short. He died in Edinburgh in 1447, probably at the end of the summer. He was buried in St Mary's chapel, Dunfermline.

Religious titles
Preceded by Alexander de Lawedre (unconsecrated); James Kennedy	Bishop of Dunkeld; 1441/2–47	Succeeded by William Turnbull
Preceded by James Cameron	Bishop of Glasgow; 1441/2–47	Succeeded by William Turnbull
Political offices
Preceded by James Kennedy	Chancellor of Scotland; 1444–47	Succeeded by William Crichton
