= Andrew de Durisdeer =

Scottish bishop

- Bishop of Glasgow
- Church: Roman Catholic Church
- Diocese: Glasgow
- Appointed: 5 May 1455
- Term ended: 20 November 1473
- Predecessor: William Turnbull
- Successor: John Laing
- Previous post(s): Dean of Aberdeen; Sub-dean of Glasgow

Personal details
- Died: 20 November 1473

Andrew de Durisdeer [Durisdere] (possibly Andrew Muirhead; died 20 November 1473) was a 15th-century bishop of Glasgow. The geographical appellation "de Durisdeer" indicates that he came from Durisdeer in Galloway. Durisdeer is often taken as an Anglo-Latin corruption of dorus doire, entrance to the wood or thicket; but the word dair is also an old Gaelic word for an oakwood, and this is probably why de Durisdeer had acorns on his seal. This is also an indication that Muirhead may very well have been his surname; other prominent Muirheads of the period also had acorns on their seals.

De Durisdeer obtained a Bachelor's degree at the University of St Andrews, and in 1437 was admitted into the University of Paris, gaining a licentiate upon graduation in 1438. As a subdean of the diocese of Glasgow he had a close relationship with Bishop William Turnbull. By 1450, de Durisdeer was a dean of the diocese of Aberdeen, and in the period 1451–1453 he effectively became the ambassador of King James II of Scotland to the papal court. De Durisdeer was highly thought of by Pope Nicholas V. On 7 May 1455, Pope Calixtus III personally provided Andrew to the bishopric of Glasgow, despite not yet having risen to the rank of sub-deacon. His provision followed the death of William Turnbull on 2 September 1454. He was consecrated sometime between September 1455 and May 1456.

De Durisdeer was an active player in the national governmental scene, attending the parliaments of 1464, 1467, 1468, 1469 and 1471. After the death of James II in 1460, he was appointed as one of the seven people on the Council of the Regency. He also played a role as an ambassador, visiting England in 1463 to negotiate the Treaty of York and travelling to Denmark in 1468 to arrange a marriage between the young King James III and Margaret of Denmark.

De Durisdeer died on 20 November 1473.

Catholic Church titles
Preceded by William Turnbull	Bishop of Glasgow; 1455/1456–1473	Succeeded by John Laing
