= John Laing (bishop) =

Scottish bishop and politician

- Bishop of Glasgow
- Church: Roman Catholic Church
- Diocese: Glasgow
- Appointed: 28 January 1474
- Term ended: 11 January 1483
- Predecessor: Andrew de Durisdeer
- Successor: Robert Blackadder

Personal details
- Died: 11 January 1483

John Laing was a 15th-century bishop of Glasgow, Scotland. He was from the family of "Redhouse" in the shire of Edinburgh. Before becoming bishop he was rector of Tannadice in Angus, vicar of Linlithgow, and was rector of Newlands in the diocese of Glasgow when he was appointed to the see in 1474. In 1476 he founded the Franciscan Monastery or 'Greyfriars' of Glasgow in conjunction with Thomas Forsyth, Rector of Glasgow. He was appointed Chancellor of Scotland in 1482. He died on 11 January 1483.

Religious titles
Preceded by Andrew de Durisdere	Bishop of Glasgow; 1474–1483	Succeeded by George Carmichael
Political offices
Preceded by 1st Lord Avandale	Lord Chancellor of Scotland; 1482–83	Succeeded by 1st Earl of Argyll
