= John Murdoch (bishop) =

Roman Catholic bishop in Scotland

The Right Reverend John Murdoch
- Vicar Apostolic of the Western District
- Church: Roman Catholic Church
- In office: 1846–1865
- Predecessor: Andrew Scott
- Successor: John Gray
- Other post(s): Titular Bishop of Castabala (1833–1869)
- Previous post(s): Coadjutor Vicar Apostolic of the Western District (1833–1846); Coadjutor Bishop of Kingston and Titular Bishop of Thabraca (1833–1833)

Orders
- Ordination: 19 March 1821 by Isidoro Pérez de Celís
- Consecration: 20 October 1833 by James Kyle

Personal details
- Born: 9 October 1796; Wellheads, Enzie, Scotland
- Died: 15 December 1865 (aged 69); Glasgow, Scotland
- Education: Aquhorthies College
- Alma mater: Royal Scots College

John Murdoch (9 October 1796 – 15 December 1865) was a Roman Catholic bishop who served as the Vicar Apostolic of the Western District of Scotland.

== Life ==
Born in Wellheads, Enzie, Banffshire in 1796, he entered the College of Aquhorthies on 24 January 1809 and transferred to the Scots College, Valladolid having completed his classical studies. He was ordained a priest on 19 March 1821 by the Bishop of Segovia and departed for Scotland on 8 May 1821. He was appointed to the mission at Glasgow as assistant to Andrew Scott

In March 1833, he was appointed Coadjutor Bishop of Kingston, Ontario but he declined the promotion citing his preference to minister among the poor in his own county. After petition to Rome by the Scottish Vicars Apostolic, this did not take effect. Instead he was appointed the Coadjutor Vicar Apostolic of the Western District and Titular Bishop of Castabala by the Holy See on 4 June 1833. He was consecrated to the Episcopate at St Andrew's Cathedral, Glasgow on 20 October 1833. The principal consecrator was Bishop James Kyle, and the principal co-consecrators were Bishop Andrew Scott and Bishop Andrew Carruthers. In 1834, Bishop Scott moved to Greenock giving the charge of the whole of Glasgow to Murdoch. His first task was to handle the debt with which St Andrew's Church was burdened which was finally paid off after five years.

Upon the retirement of Bishop Andrew Scott on 15 October 1845, Bishop Murdoch automatically succeeded as the Vicar Apostolic of the Western District. On 6 July 1847, Alexander Smith was appointed his coadjutor but did not keep in good health. In January 1849, Bishop Murdoch moved from St Andrew's to St Mary's, Calton although he later had to transfer to St John's, Gorbals due to the shortage of priests. Several female religious orders were established during the tenure of Murdoch, including the Franciscan Sisters of the Immaculate Conception, the Sisters of Mercy, and the Little Sisters of the Poor in Glasgow, and the Sisters of Charity of St Vincent de Paul at Lanark. A number of male orders were also established including the Passionists and Marists. His coadjutor, Bishop Smith, died in June 1861 and was replaced by John Gray.

He died in office on 15 December 1865, aged 69.

Catholic Church titles
Preceded by Andrew Scott	Vicar Apostolic of the Western District; 1845–1865	Succeeded by John Gray
