= Alexander Smith (bishop, born 1813) =

Roman Catholic bishop

Styles of Alexander Smith
- Reference style: The Right Reverend
- Spoken style: My Lord or Bishop

Alexander Smith (24 January 1813 – 15 June 1861) was a Roman Catholic bishop who served as the Coadjutor Vicar Apostolic of the Western District of Scotland.

== Biography ==
Born in Cuttlebrée, Enzie, Banffshire in 1813, he was ordained a priest on 2 February 1836. He was appointed the Coadjutor Vicar Apostolic of the Western District and Titular Bishop of Paros by the Holy See on 6 July 1847. He was consecrated to the Episcopate at St Andrew's Cathedral, Glasgow on 3 October 1847. The principal consecrator was Bishop John Murdoch, and the principal co-consecrators were Bishop James Kyle and Bishop Andrew Carruthers.

He died before succeeded as the Vicar Apostolic of the Western District on 15 June 1861, aged 48.

Catholic Church titles
Preceded by John Murdoch	Coadjutor Vicar Apostolic of the Western District; 1847–1861	Succeeded by John Gray
