= John Gray (Scottish bishop) =

Scottish bishop (1817–1872)

The Right Reverend John Gray
- Vicar Apostolic of the Western District
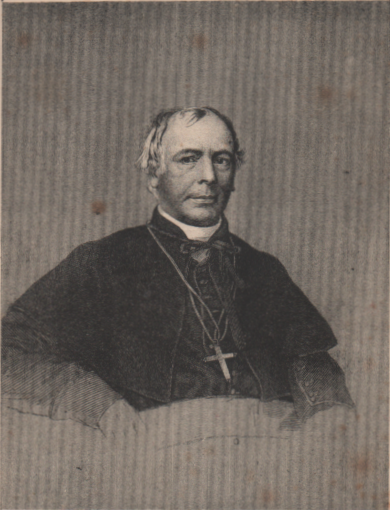
- Church: Roman Catholic Church
- In office: 1865–1869
- Predecessor: John Murdoch
- Successor: Charles Eyre
- Other post: Titular bishop of Hypsus (1862–1872)
- Previous posts: Coadjutor Vicar Apostolic of the Western District (1862–1865)

Orders
- Ordination: 1 May 1841 by Giuseppe Maria Vespignani
- Consecration: 19 October 1862 by David Moriarty

Personal details
- Born: 16 June 1817 Buckie, Banffshire, Scotland
- Died: 14 January 1872 (aged 54) Rothesay, Scotland
- Buried: Old Dalbeth Cemetery, Braidfauld
- Education: St Mary's College, Blairs; Pontifical Scots College

John Gray (16 June 1817 – 14 January 1872) was a Roman Catholic bishop who served as the Vicar Apostolic of the Western District of Scotland.

== Life ==
Born in Buckie, Moray on 16 June 1817, Bishop Gray was the son of William Gray and Joanna Gray (née Scott). His maternal uncle was Bishop Andrew Scott. He entered the Blairs College on 27 July 1832 and the Scots College in Rome on 30 September 1838, and took the oath on 25 March 1839. He was ordained a subdeacon on 27 March 1841, a deacon on 10 April 1841, and a priest on 1 May 1841. He left the Scots College for the mission in Scotland on 17 April 1843.

=== Priesthood ===
Upon his return he was made an assistant at St Andrew's, Glasgow. In 1846, he was given charge of the new mission, dedicated to St John the Evangelist, in the Gorbals, followed by a brief appointment to the mission at Airdrie. From there he was selected by Bishop Smith accompany him on a tour of North America from which he returned on 23 January 1849. He resumed his post at St John's, Gorbals, and remained there for almost five years. Afterward he was returned to St Andrew's, Glasgow in November 1853, this time in charge. He procured a site for a school on Greendyke Street, fronting Glasgow Green, which was opened in May 1856 and consisted of two large halls; the lower of which was for boys and the upper for girls. In 1860, he was named vicar general.

=== Episcopate ===
He was appointed the Coadjutor Vicar Apostolic of the Western District and Titular Bishop of Ipsus by the Holy See on 6 May 1862 upon the death of Alexander Smith, and was consecrated to the Episcopate at St Andrew's Cathedral, Glasgow on 19 October 1862. The principal consecrator was David Moriarty, Bishop of Ardfert and Aghadoe, and the principal co-consecrators were Bishop James Kyle and Bishop John Murdoch. He suffered ill health, the result of which was an almost total loss of memory, and retired to Rothesay for some time in 1863. He returned to Glasgow after a partial recovery.

On the death of Bishop John Murdoch on 15 December 1865, he automatically succeeded as the Vicar Apostolic of the Western District. His health remained poor and he requested from Rome the appointment of a coadjutor. The following year, James Lynch was appointed Coadjutor Vicar Apostolic to Bishop Gray on 31 August 1866.

Bishop Gray resigned as Vicar Apostolic of the Western District on 4 March 1869 and retired to Rothesay. However, he was not succeeded by Bishop Lynch, who was relieved of his Scottish coadjutorship on 4 April 1869 and translated to the coadjutorship of Kildare and Leighlin in Ireland on 13 April 1869, and eventually succeeded as bishop of that diocese on 5 March 1888. Instead, Bishop Gray was succeeded by Archbishop Charles Petre Eyre, who was appointed Apostolic Administrator of the Western District on 16 April 1869.

Bishop Gray died on 14 January 1872, aged 54.

Catholic Church titles
Preceded by John Murdoch	Vicar Apostolic of the Western District; 1865–1869	Succeeded by Charles Petre Eyre
