= William Turnbull (bishop) =

Scottish politician and bishop

- Bishop of Glasgow
- Church: Roman Catholic Church
- Diocese: Glasgow
- Appointed: 27 October 1447
- Term ended: 3 September 1454
- Predecessor: James Bruce
- Successor: Andrew de Durisdeer
- Previous post(s): Bishop of Dunkeld; 1447–1447

Personal details
- Born: Bedrule, Scotland
- Died: 3 September 1454; Rome, Papal States

William Turnbull (died 3 September 1454) was a Scottish politician and bishop, credited with founding Jedburgh Grammar School and the University of Glasgow. He served as the Bishop of Glasgow from 1448 to 1454 and was the first Chancellor of the University of Glasgow.

== Biography ==
He came from Bedrule in the Scottish Borders, where a plaque in the local church is erected in his memory.

He studied arts at the University of St Andrews (1419), canon law at the University of Leuven, and went on to study at the University of Pavia, Italy, for a doctorate in canon law (1439).

Upon his return to Scotland, he befriended King James II and became Keeper of the Privy Seal (1440–1448) and Royal Secretary (1441–1442). In 1447 he was appointed Bishop of Dunkeld, then a year later Bishop of Glasgow which he held until his death in 1454.

On 28 October 1447, John Pigott, the manorial lord, presented Ven William Turnbull, "Bishop of Dunkeld," to the Rectory of Abington Pigotts, in the Diocese of Ely.

During his time as Bishop, he pursued the formation of a university in Glasgow with the encouragement of King James. On 7 January 1451, Pope Nicholas V issued a papal bull decreeing the foundation of the University of Glasgow, which started classes in the Glasgow Cathedral buildings, with Turnbull as the first chancellor. Turnbull is credited with founding Jedburgh Grammar School at Jedburgh Abbey.

Turnbull High School in Bishopbriggs is named after him, as is Turnbull Hall, the Catholic Chaplaincy at the University of Glasgow.

Political offices
Preceded by William Foulis	Keeper of the Privy Seal of Scotland; 1442–1454	Succeeded by Thomas Spens; Bishop of Galloway
Catholic Church titles
Preceded by James Bruce	Bishop of Dunkeld; Elect 1447	Succeeded by John Raulston
Preceded by James Bruce	Bishop of Glasgow; 1447/8–1454	Succeeded by Andrew de Durisdere
Academic offices
Preceded by University established	Chancellor of the University of Glasgow; 1451 to 1454	Succeeded by Andrew de Durisdeer
