= Andrew Stewart, 1st Lord Avandale =

Arms of Andrew Stewart, 1st Lord Avandale: Quarterly: 1st, Or a Lion rampant Gules, armed and langued Azure, within a Double-Tressure flory counter-flory Gules (Scotland); 2nd, Or, a Fess chequy Azure and Argent, in chief a Label of three-points Gules (Stuart); 3rd, Argent, a Saltire between four Roses Gules, barbed and seeded proper (Lennox); 4th, Or, a Lion rampant Gules (Macduff).

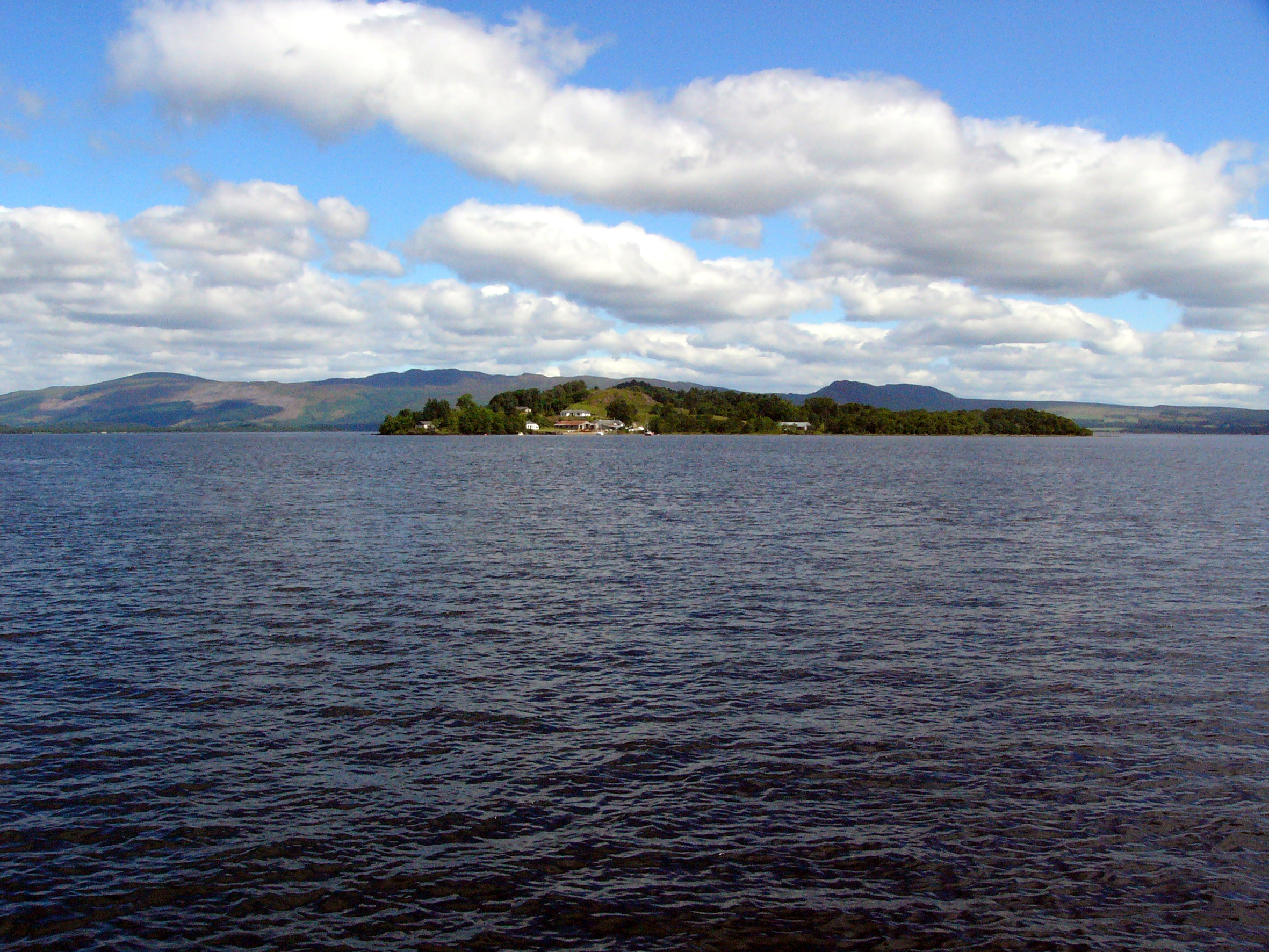
Andrew Stewart was raised at Inchmurrin, Loch Lomond, where his grandmother Isabella of Lennox retired after her release from Tantallon Castle.

Andrew Stewart (c. 1420 – 1488) was Lord Chancellor of Scotland from 1460 to 1482 and one of the leading servants of King James III of Scotland.

== Early life ==
Andrew Stewart was born c. 1420 and "appears to have been the eldest son of Walter Stewart (c.1392–1425), second son of Murdoch Stewart, Duke of Albany (c.1362–1425), and Isabella, Countess of Lennox (d. 1458/9)... Andrew, together with brothers Arthur and Walter, obtained letters of legitimation from James III in 1472, repeated in 1479." His grandfather Murdoch Stewart, Duke of Albany was executed for treason in 1425 by King James I of Scotland.

Andrew Stewart was raised at the court of his paternal grandmother Isabella, Countess of Lennox. It may be that Isabella, having seen her own children and husband executed by James I of Scotland, took pity on her dead son's children and brought them to her own court.

Andrew attended a university in England, in which country he was knighted before 12 July 1437 with his brother Murdoch. As well as Murdoch and Marion, two other siblings, Arthur and Walter, are known.

== Return to Scotland ==
Returning to Scotland by 1440, he attended the general council held at Stirling in August of that year. He held office in royal household of King James II and was granted lands, including Avandale and Strathavon, which had been forfeited by William Douglas, 8th Earl of Douglas. He was also made warden of the march and keeper of the castle of Lochmaben. By 11 June 1457, he had been granted the title Lord Avandale.

== Lord Chancellor of Scotland ==
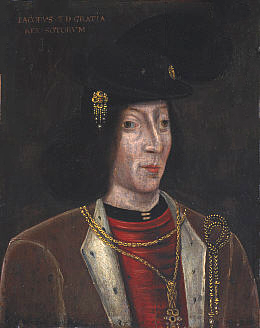
James III of Scotland (1451–1488)

In 1460, Avandale was made Chancellor of Scotland, a position he retained into the next reign. He served as one of the regents, during the minority of King James III of Scotland. He then served as governor of Stirling Castle and as an ambassador and diplomat, taking a leading role in the negotiations which led to the marriage of James and Margaret of Denmark in 1469. In 1471 he was granted the rents of the Earldom of Lennox for life.

== Replacement as Lord Chancellor ==
During the crisis of 1482, James III declared war on England for protecting his brother Alexander Stewart, Duke of Albany, who had rebelled and was given sanctuary by the Duke of Gloucester, who later became King Richard III. When Albany and his English allies invaded Scotland, Lord Avandale was one of the faction who refused to fight and then proceeded to arrest the King. Albany then proclaimed himself King Alexander IV of Scotland and immediately began to alienate the nobles—especially the powerful George Gordon, 2nd Earl of Huntly—by his harsh policies.

On Alexander's orders, Lord Avandale was then stripped of the Chancellorship because he had captured Albany's castle of Dumbarton for the King in 1479. He was replaced as Lord Chancellor by John Laing, the Bishop of Glasgow. Because of Alexander's treatment of the nobles, James III had been able to gain back most of their support and in 1483 with help from the Earl of Huntly, James was able to call a Parliament that condemned Albany as a traitor and forced him into exile for a second and final time. Avandale had been present at the Parliament and the following year he was one of the ambassadors sent to Louis XI of France. After this he appears to have largely withdrawn from public business. He died in 1488 and was succeeded by his brother Walter's son Alexander. Alexander died c. 1500 and the title Lord Avandale passed to his son, Andrew Stewart, 2nd Lord Avandale.

== Ancestry ==
Ancestors of Andrew Stewart, 1st Lord Avandale

8. Robert Stewart, Duke of Albany
4. Murdoch Stewart, Duke of Albany
9. Margaret, Countess of Menteith
2. Walter Stewart (executed 1425)
10. Donnchadh, Earl of Lennox
5. Isabella of Lennox
11. Helena Campbell
1. Andrew Stewart, 1st Lord Avondale
12. unknown
6. unknown
13. unknown
3. unknown
7. unknown

== Notes ==
Political offices
Preceded by George de Schoriswood, Bishop of Brechin	Lord Chancellor of Scotland; 1460–1482	Succeeded by John Laing, Bishop of Glasgow
Peerage of Scotland
New creation	Lord Avondale; 1459–1488	Extinct
