= John Ainslie =

Scottish surveyor and cartographer

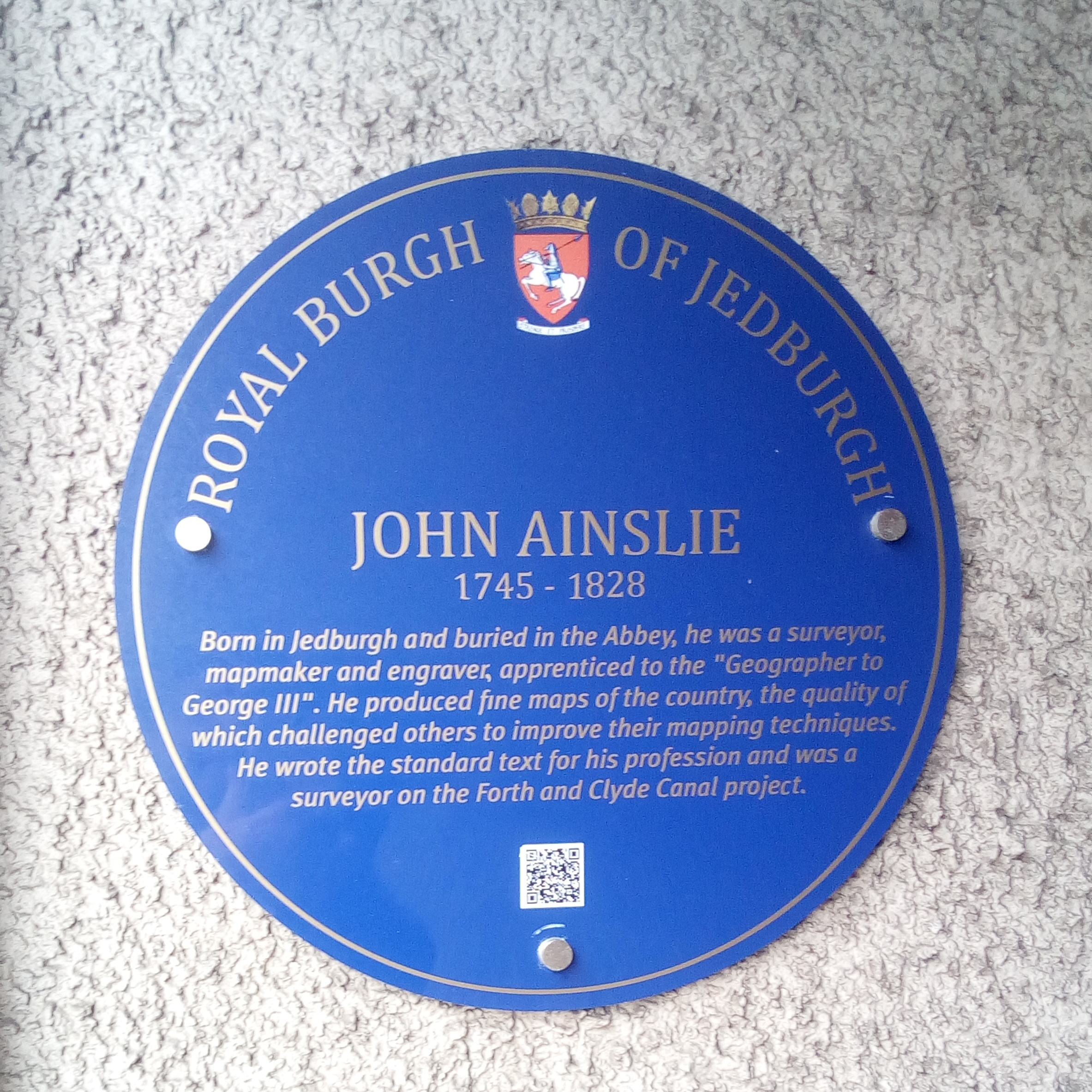
A plaque in Castlegate in Jedburgh

John Ainslie (22 April 1745 – 29 February 1828) was a Scottish surveyor and cartographer.

== Life ==
Ainslie was born in Jedburgh, the youngest son of John Ainslie, a druggist, Writer to the Signet and burgess of the burgh. He was educated at Jedburgh Grammar School. He began his career as an apprentice to the "Geographer to King George III", engraver and publisher Thomas Jefferys and worked as a surveyor and engraver for the English County series of maps. After Jefferys' death he returned to Scotland where he surveyed Scottish counties, engraving and publishing the maps. His primary focus was on the coasts and islands of Scotland. The quality of his maps challenged others to improve their mapping style making maps more clear and easy to read.

From 1787 to 1789 Ainslie worked on a new nine sheet map of Scotland publishing it in 1789. The map was a landmark in the improvement of the outline of Scotland and for the first time showed the Great Glen as a straight line and Skye, Mull, and Islay shown with more accuracy than had previously been seen.

He worked as a surveyor on several civil engineering projects including the Forth and Clyde canal with Robert Whitworth, Charles Rennie on Saltcoats harbour and the Glasgow to Ardrossan canal.

John was also a book-seller, which helped him in writing and publishing works of his own.

He wrote the standard text for his profession, the "Comprehensive treatise on Land Surveying comprising the Theory and Practice of all its Branches".

On 27 October 1776 he married Christian, the daughter and heiress of Jedburgh merchant Thomas Caverhill. In Edinburgh in the 1780s they lived on Parliament Square on the Royal Mile.

He died at 72 Nicolson Street in Edinburgh on the 29 February 1828 and is buried at Jedburgh Abbey.

Other sources suggest he was married to Mary Lookup and they had two children. No dates provided.

== Maps ==
Many of Ainslie's maps are in the collection of National Library of Scotland including:

- The county of Fife published in 1775
- Scotland, drawn from a series of angles and astronomical observations..., in 9 sheets, published in 1789
- A plan of Jedburgh published in 1780
- City of Edinburgh published in 1780
- The Old and New Town of Edinburgh and Leith, 1804
- Ainslie's Map of the Southern Part of Scotland published in 1821
