= Bob Keiller =

British businessman (born 1964)

- Born: 29 January 1964 (age 62)
- Education: Heriot-Watt University
- Occupation: Businessman
- Years active: 1985–present
- Title: Former chief executive, Wood Group
- Term: 2012–2015
- Predecessor: Allister Langlands
- Successor: Robin Watson

Robert Keiller CBE (born 29 January 1964) is a British businessman. He is the former chief executive of Wood Group, a British multinational oil and gas services company headquartered in Aberdeen, Scotland. In 2016, he became chairman of Scotland's national economic development agency, Scottish Enterprise. He also runs a consultancy, AB15.

== Early life ==
Keiller grew up in the border town Jedburgh, here he attended Jedburgh Grammar School. He went on to study a Masters of Engineering degree from Heriot-Watt University and is a Chartered Engineer. He has an honorary doctorate from Robert Gordon University.

== Career ==
Keiller was the chief executive of Wood Group from 2012 to 2015, having been group director of Wood Group PSN since April 2011 and CEO of Production Services Network (PSN) prior to its acquisition by Wood Group. He was CEO of PSN since 2006, having led Halliburton's production services division in the early 2000s before piloting its buyout from Kellogg Brown & Root in 2006. He was previously chairman of the Offshore Contractors Association, the Helicopter Issues Task Group, chairman of the Entrepreneurial Exchange and co-chair of Oil & Gas UK.

Keiller left Wood Group at the end of 2015, receiving a golden parachute of nearly £500,000.

He was appointed Commander of the Order of the British Empire (CBE) in the 2017 Birthday Honours for services to business and entrepreneurship.

== Personal life ==
He lives in Bieldside, Aberdeen.
