= George Carmichael =

Scottish bishop

George Carmichael [George de Carmichel] was a 15th-century bishop-elect of Glasgow. He was elected to the bishopric in early 1483 soon after the death of his predecessor John Laing. He was never consecrated. The Pope, Pope Sixtus IV, rejected his election because he had previously reserved the see for himself. Sixtus provided instead Robert Blackadder to the bishopric. He may have died in 1484 on the way to the Holy See to appeal the pope's decision.

Religious titles
Preceded by John Laing	Bishop of Glasgow unconsecrated Elect 1483	Succeeded by Robert Blackadder
