= Robin Watson =

- Born: February 1967 (age 59)
- Occupation: Businessman
- Title: Former CEO, Wood Group
- Term: 2016–2022
- Predecessor: Bob Keiller
- Successor: Ken Gilmartin
- Children: 3

Robin Watson CBE (born February 1967) is a British businessman from Campbeltown, Scotland. He is the former chief executive (CEO) of Wood Plc, a Scottish multinational engineering and consultancy company focused on energy and materials headquartered in Aberdeen, Scotland. In October 2017, Watson became the CEO of Wood plc, which resulted from the acquisition of Amec Foster Wheeler by the Wood Group.

In October 2015, it was announced that Watson, who has worked for Wood Group since 2010, would take over as CEO in January 2016, succeeding Bob Keiller who had decided to retire.

In April 2022, it was announced that Watson would be retiring and would be succeeded by Ken Gilmartin as the new CEO, effective July 2022

He was appointed Commander of the Order of the British Empire (CBE) in the 2020 Birthday Honours for services to international trade.

Watson is married with three children.
