= Jedburgh Grammar School =

Coordinates: 55.479017°N 2.553134°W

Location
- High Street; Jedburgh, TD8 6DQ; Scotland

Information
- Type: Secondary
- Local authority: Scottish Borders
- Rector: Susan Oliver
- Staff: c. 55
- Gender: Coeducational
- Age: 11 to 18
- Enrolment: c. 440
- Houses: Brewster, Rutherford, Thomson
- Colours: Navy blue, red, green
- Website: https://www.jedburghgrammarcampus.com/

Jedburgh Grammar School is a state secondary school in Jedburgh, Scotland, with around 440 pupils, 40 teaching staff, and 15 non-teaching staff.

== History ==
While the first institution bearing the name Jedburgh Grammar School was founded in the 15th century by William Turnbull of Bedrule who was then Bishop of Glasgow and the school was based at Jedburgh Abbey where the pupils (boys) would sing and learn about music. In 1747 the school was still based in the crypts of the abbey. This school was created as a result of the Education (Scotland) Act of 1872 which required that children should receive an education. The school was extended at the turn of the century when secondary education was also offered.

== Architecture ==
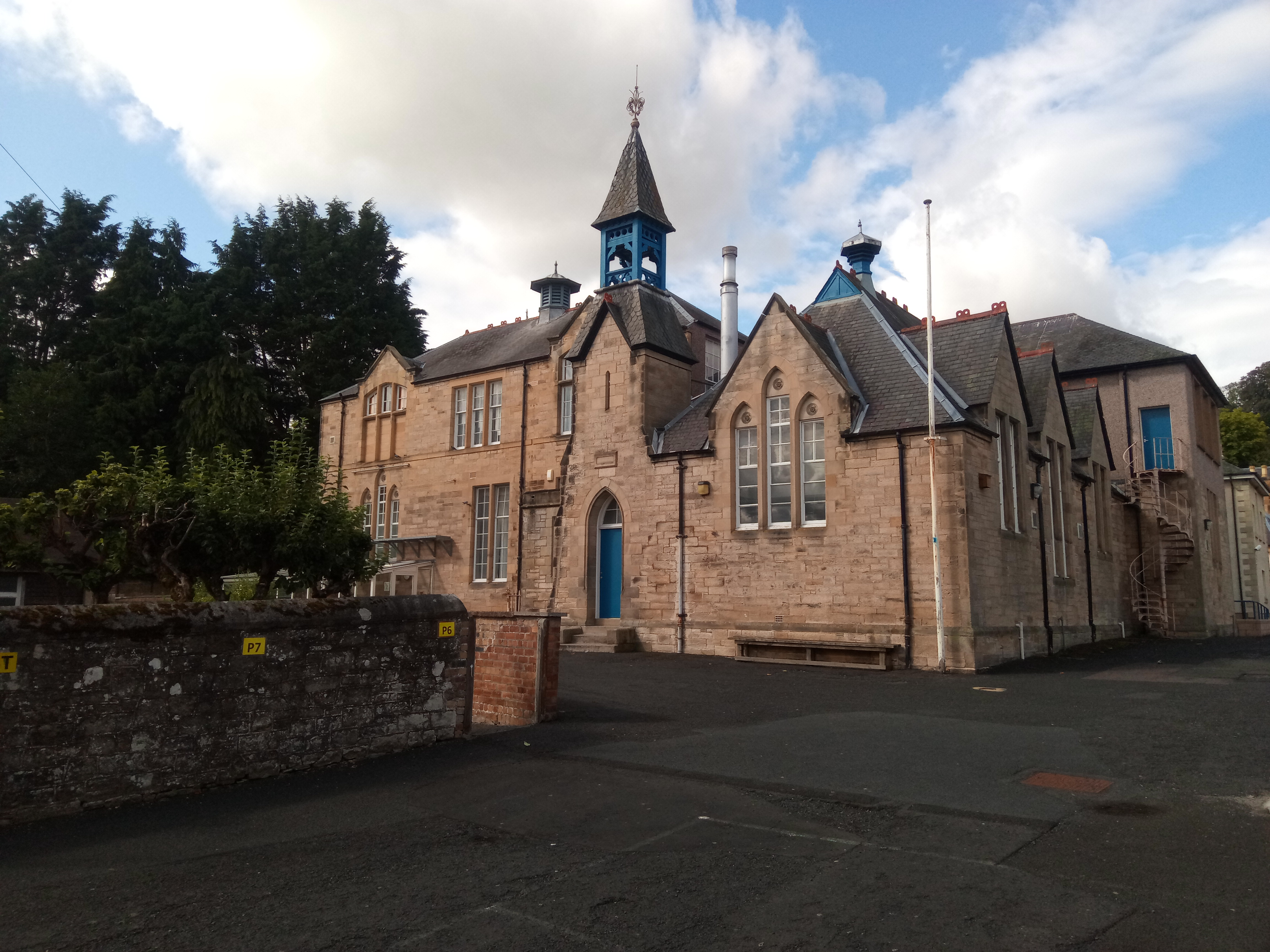
1880s buildings

The school is made up of five main buildings. The original buildings at this site were started in 1882 to designs by Hardy & Wight and are dated to 1885, whilst the Rutherford and Sports Centre buildings date from the 1970s. The 1880 part of the school was "listed" in 1993. Since the 1990s, a series of refurbishments have taken place. Ramps were added to the Brewster, Drama and Social Dining Building in 2013.

In July 2022 Jedburgh Grammar Campus was shortlisted for the RIAS Andrew Doolan Best Building in Scotland Award.

== Houses ==
Pupils of the school belong to one of three Houses named after famous alumni: The most notable person from Jedburgh (Mary Somerville) was a woman and could not attend the school.

- Brewster (Blue, named after physicist Sir David Brewster)
- Rutherford (Red, named after theologian Samuel Rutherford)
- Thomson (Green, named after poet James Thomson)

== Notable alumni ==
- John Ainslie, cartographer
- Gary Armstrong, rugby union player
- Anthony Fasson GC, naval officer
- Karen Gillon, MSP
- Ainslie Henderson, singer-songwriter, BAFTA-winning animator
- Steve Hislop, motorcycle racer
- Bob Keiller, business man
- Greig Laidlaw, rugby union player
- Roy Laidlaw, rugby union player
- The Rt. Hon. Michael Moore MP, Secretary of State for Scotland.
- Douglas Young, heavyweight boxer
