= Robert Bruce, 3rd Baron of Clackmannan =

Robert Bruce
- Born: Clackmannan, Scotland
- Died: c. 1405
- Children: David, Edward, and James
- Parent(s): Robert Bruce; Isabel Stewart

Sir Robert Bruce, 3rd Baron of Clackmannan & Rate (died c. 1405) was the son of Sir Robert Bruce, 2nd Baron of Clackmannan & Rate and Isabel Stewart of Fife.

Robert Bruce was born into the Scottish aristocracy in Clackmannan, Scotland. He married the daughter of John Scrimgeour of Dudhope, by whom he had at least three children:

- David Bruce: Succeeded his father as 4th Baron of Clackmannan
- Edward Bruce: Married Agnes, the daughter and co-heiress of Sir William Airth of Airth
- James Bruce: Later Bishop of Dunkeld

== Ancestry ==
Ancestors of Robert Bruce, 3rd Baron of Clackmannan

Thomas Bruce
Robert Bruce
Marjorie Charteris
Robert Bruce
Isabel Stewart
