= Robert Bruce, 2nd Baron of Clackmannan =

Scottish nobleman (died 1403)

Robert Bruce
- Born: Clackmannan, Scotland
- Died: 23 July 1403
- Spouse: Isabel Stewart
- Children: Robert, Edward, James, Alexander, Thomas, and Helen
- Parent(s): Thomas Bruce; Marjorie Charteris

Sir Robert Bruce, 2nd Baron of Clackmannan & Rate (originally Robert de Bruys; fl. 1359 - died 23 July 1403) was the son of Thomas Bruce and Marjorie Charteris of Stenhouse.

== Background ==
Robert Bruce was born in Clackmannan, Scotland, the son of Thomas Bruce and his wife Marjory. Robert received more land in Clackmannan in 1359 from his cousin, King David II, and additional land in Rate, Scotland in 1367.

He married Isabel Stewart, the daughter of Robert Stewart of Durisdeer, Dumfriesshire, with whom he had five sons and a daughter:

- Robert Bruce, 3rd Baron of Clackmannan (died c. 1405)
- Edward Bruce, of Stenhouse: Married Agnes Airth, daughter of Sir William Airth of Airth, around 1417.
- James Bruce: Bishop of Dunkeld
- Alexander Bruce
- Thomas Bruce, of Wester Kennet (who had a charter for those and other lands on 2 May 1389); and
- Helen Bruce: Married David Ross of Balnagown.

Robert was captured and killed on 23 July 1403, during the Battle of Shrewsbury, and his son Robert succeeded him as third baron.
