= St Andrew's Cathedral, Glasgow =

Coordinates: 55.855461°N 4.252897°W

St Andrew's Cathedral
- Metropolitan Cathedral Church of St Andrew or Glasgow Metropolitan Cathedral
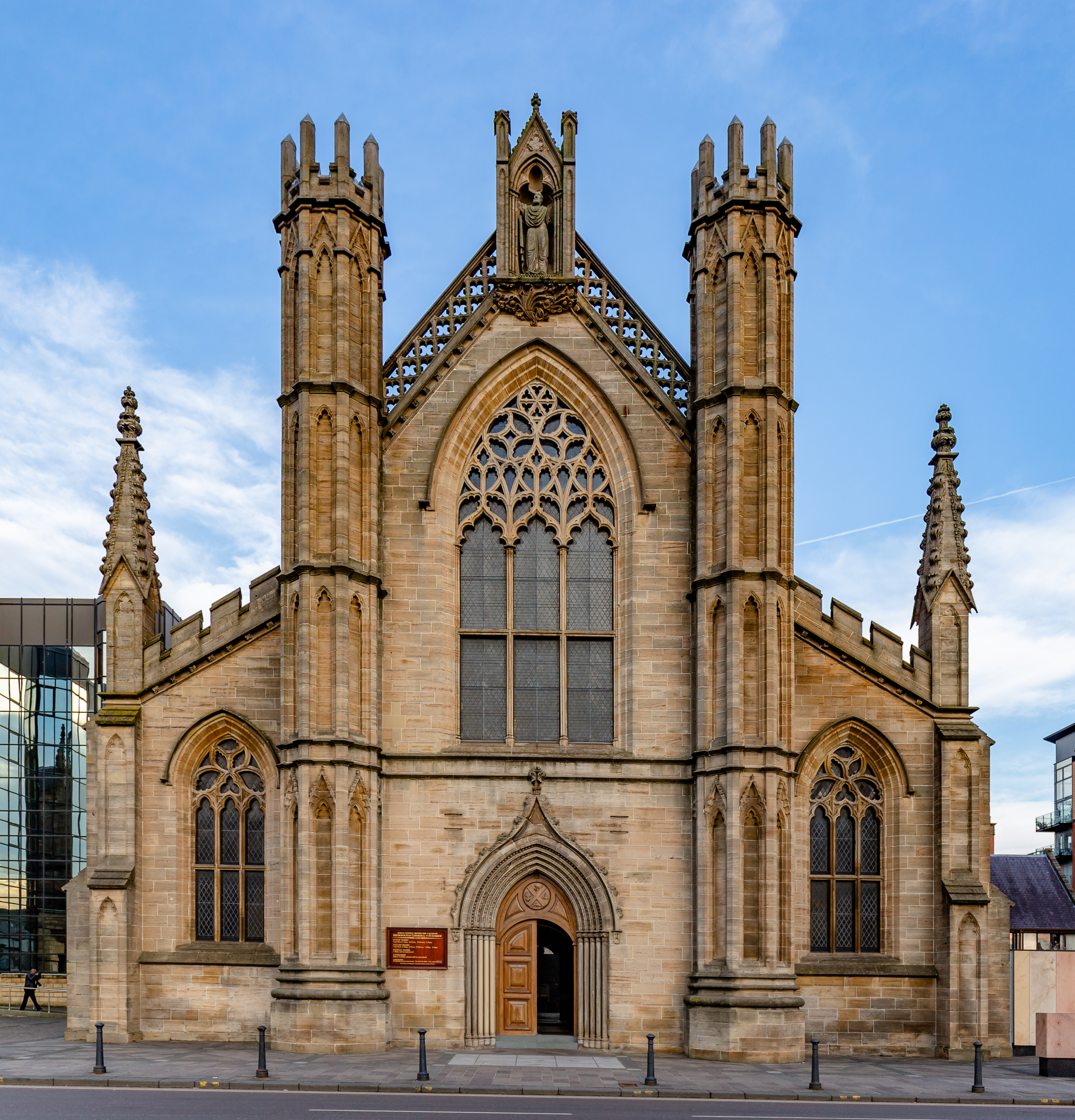
- Glasgow Metropolitan Cathedral on the banks of the River Clyde

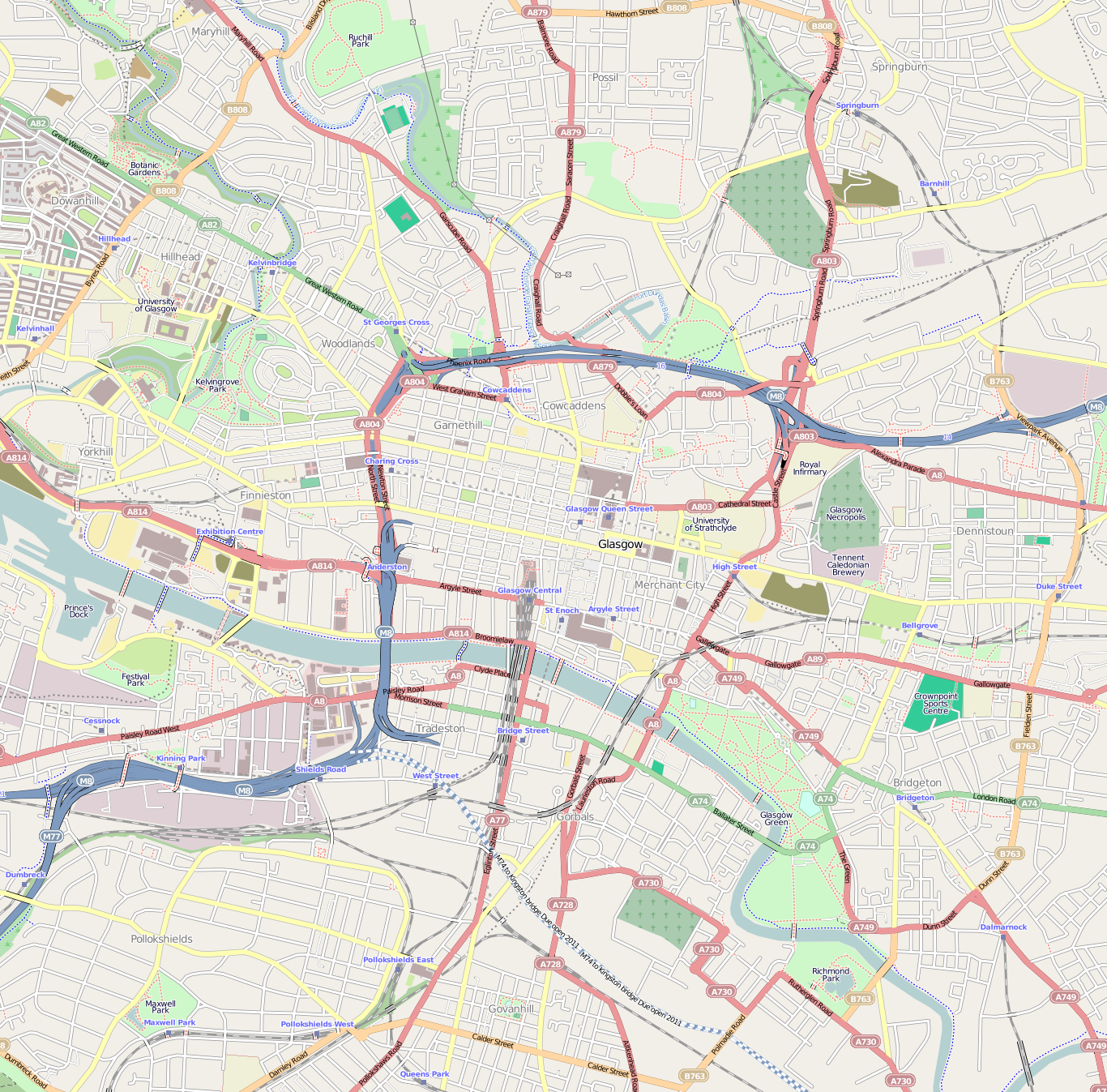
- Shown within Glasgow
- Location: Glasgow, Strathclyde
- Country: Scotland
- Denomination: Catholic
- Website: www.cathedralG1.org

Architecture
- Heritage designation: Category A
- Designated: 15 December 1970
- Architect: James Gillespie Graham
- Style: Gothic Revival
- Years built: 1814–16

Administration
- Province: Glasgow
- Archdiocese: Glasgow

Clergy
- Archbishop: William Nolan
- Dean: Canon David J. Wallace PhB STL

The Metropolitan Cathedral Church of Saint Andrew or Glasgow Metropolitan Cathedral is a Latin Catholic cathedral in the city centre of Glasgow, Scotland. It is the mother church of the Archdiocese of Glasgow. The cathedral, which was designed in 1814 by James Gillespie Graham in the Neo-Gothic style, lies on the north bank of the River Clyde in Clyde Street. St Andrew's Cathedral is the seat of the Archbishop of Glasgow, currently William Nolan. It is dedicated to the patron saint of Scotland, Saint Andrew.

== History ==
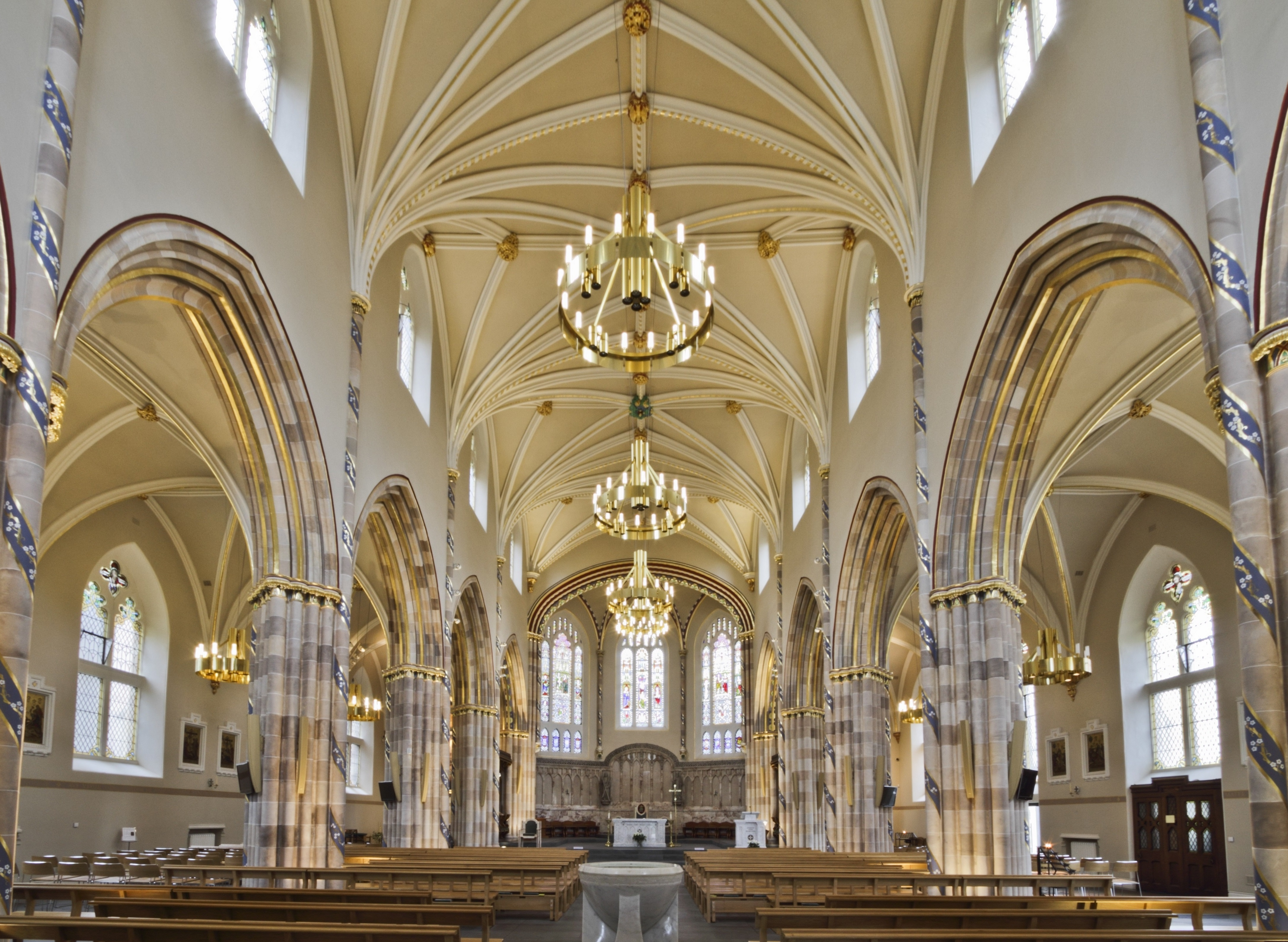
Interior

From the Scottish Reformation of 1560 until the beginning of the Catholic Emancipation process in 1791, with the Roman Catholic Relief Act 1791 (31 Geo. 3. c. 32) – which restored certain civil rights and freedom of worship – Catholics in Glasgow had to worship covertly. By the end of the 18th century, particularly with the influx of Irish Catholic immigrants to Glasgow during the nascent stages of the Industrial Revolution, there emerged an increasing demand for a Catholic church in the city. In 1805 there were approximately 450 Catholics in the city, but by 1814 the number of recorded communicants in the city had increased to 3,000, and in that year the decision was taken by Fr Andrew Scott to build a new church in Clyde Street.

The lands upon which the church was built had been purchased from the owners of the firm of Bogle and Scott which had previously traded from that site as part of Glasgow's tobacco and sugar trade with America and the West Indies. The families of Bogle and Scott, mostly Presbyterian and Episcopalian, were prominent names in Glasgow who owned numerous estates around the city and often held leading municipal offices, such as George Bogle of Daldowie, Lord Rector of the university.

Designed by James Gillespie Graham (1776–1855) in 1814, the church of St. Andrew formally re-introduced the Catholic presence to Glasgow. The continuing hostility against the Catholic Church in Scotland was evident during the construction of the church: Work completed during the day was torn down by saboteurs at night, delaying completion and eventually guards had to be placed on the building site to protect the construction works. However, congregations of other Christian denominations in the city donated money for the completion of the project in a gesture of ecumenism in light of the difficulties faced in construction. The church was completed in 1816.

The church building is relatively modest in scale, without a steeple or bell tower. This was due primarily to continuing restrictions on the prominence of Catholic places of worship under the Roman Catholic Relief Act 1791 (31 Geo. 3. c. 32), that were not ultimately repealed until the later Roman Catholic Relief Act 1829.

In the wake of the Restoration of the Scottish hierarchy, undertaken by Pope Leo XIII in 1878, the church of St Andrew was eventually raised to the status of pro-cathedral in 1884, and was also extensively renovated at that time by the architects Pugin and Pugin.

In 1947, with the establishment of the new Dioceses of Motherwell and Paisley, the Archdiocese of Glasgow recovered the status of metropolitan diocese which it had had before the Reformation and St Andrew's became a metropolitan cathedral.

== Organ ==
The cathedral's pipe organ was originally built in 1903 by Henry Willis & Sons for the former Elgin Place Congregational Church at the corner of Pitt Street and Bath Street, and was reinstalled at St Andrew's Cathedral in 1981, when the church closed for worship.

The specification is as follows:

Pedals

Open Diapason (Mirrlees) 32 Open Diapason 16 Bourdon 16 Octave 8 Flute Bass 8

Choir

Hohl Flute 8 Gamba 8 Dulciana 8 Flute Harmonique 4 Piccolo 2 Corno Di Bassetto 8

Great Organ

Double Diapason 16 Open Diapason No.1 8 Open Diapason No.2 8 Clarabel Flute 8 Principal 4 Harmonic Flute 4 Fifteenth 2 Mixture 3rks Trumpet 8 Clarion 4

Swell Organ

Lieblich Bourdon 16 Open Diapason 8 Lieblich Gedact 8 Salicional 8 Vox Angelica 8 Gemshorn 4 Flageolet 2 Hautboy 8 Cornopean 8 Clarion 4

Couplers

Swell to Pedal Choir to Pedal Great to Pedal Swell to Choir Swell Octave to Great Swell to Great

As part of the cathedral renovation in 2009/2010 the organ was dismantled and placed in storage by David Wells (Organ Builders Ltd) Liverpool. There is currently an Allen Protégé AP-6 electronic organ in use. There is an organ restoration fund to reinstall the Willis.

== St Andrew's Parish ==
St Andrew's Parish traces its origins to the reappointment of a parish priest for Glasgow in 1792. That year, two hundred people came to the opening Mass in a rented hall in Mitchell Street. Five years later, new premises in the Calton area of the East End provided for 600 people each Sunday until the celebration of the first Mass in the new Church of St Andrew at Clyde Street on 22 December 1816.

Since then, the opening of new parishes and the redevelopment of the city centre have depleted the population of the cathedral parish, but the remaining small community of parishioners is augmented by numbers from elsewhere, some of whom travel considerable distances to assist with the celebration of the liturgy and the care of the fabric. Shoppers, workers, students, tourists and passers-by also regularly visit the cathedral – for quiet prayer, for Mass, or for the Sacrament of Reconciliation. There are also major liturgies celebrated frequently by the archbishop, which attract worshippers from parishes throughout the archdiocese.

== Renovation ==
A major restoration project began on 14 August 2009 as the cathedral had long been in need of major refurbishment and expansion. The programme of renovation included the completion of new heating and lighting systems as well as redecoration and gold leaf restoration, installation of newly commissioned bronze doors, the repair and reinstatement of the pipe organ and the installation of a new canvas by Peter Howson depicting the martyrdom of St John Ogilvie. The work was completed in April 2011, and saw the return of the cathedra to St Andrew's Cathedral from the temporary pro-cathedral of the Archdiocese of Glasgow at Saint Mary's, Calton. The cathedral re-opened officially on 11 April 2011.

== Clergy ==
- Alexander MacDonell (1792–95)
- John Farquharson (1795–1805)
- Andrew Scott (1805–)
- Alexander Smith (–1853)
- John Gray (1853–60)
- James Macintosh
- Mgr. Alexander Munro (1867–92)
- James Mackintosh (1893–1900)
- Canon James W. McCarthy (1900–14)
- Canon George W. Ritchie (1914–23)
- Canon James Mullin (1923–25)
- Mgr. William Canon Daly (1925–47)
- Canon Joseph Daniel (1947–65)
- Canon Denis Meechan (1965–67)
- Mgr. John Canon McGuckin (1967–80)
- Canon John Brannan (1980–83)
- Mgr. Hugh N. Canon Boyle (1983–)
- Canon Hugh J. McEwan (–1995)
- Mgr. James T. Canon Clancy (1995–2004)
- Mgr. Christopher McElroy (2004–17)
- Canon Gerald Sharkey (2017–22)
- Canon Andrew McKenzie (2022–24)
- Canon David J. Wallace (2024–present)

== See also ==
- Archbishop of Glasgow
- Catholicism in Scotland
- Glasgow Cathedral, the Church of Scotland Presbyterian High Kirk of Glasgow
- St Mary's Cathedral, Glasgow, the Episcopalian cathedral
- St Luke's Orthodox Cathedral, Glasgow, the Greek Orthodox cathedral
- Listed Building in Scotland
