= Archdiocese of Glasgow (historic) =

Diocese of the Scottish church

Coordinates: 55.866°N 4.257°W

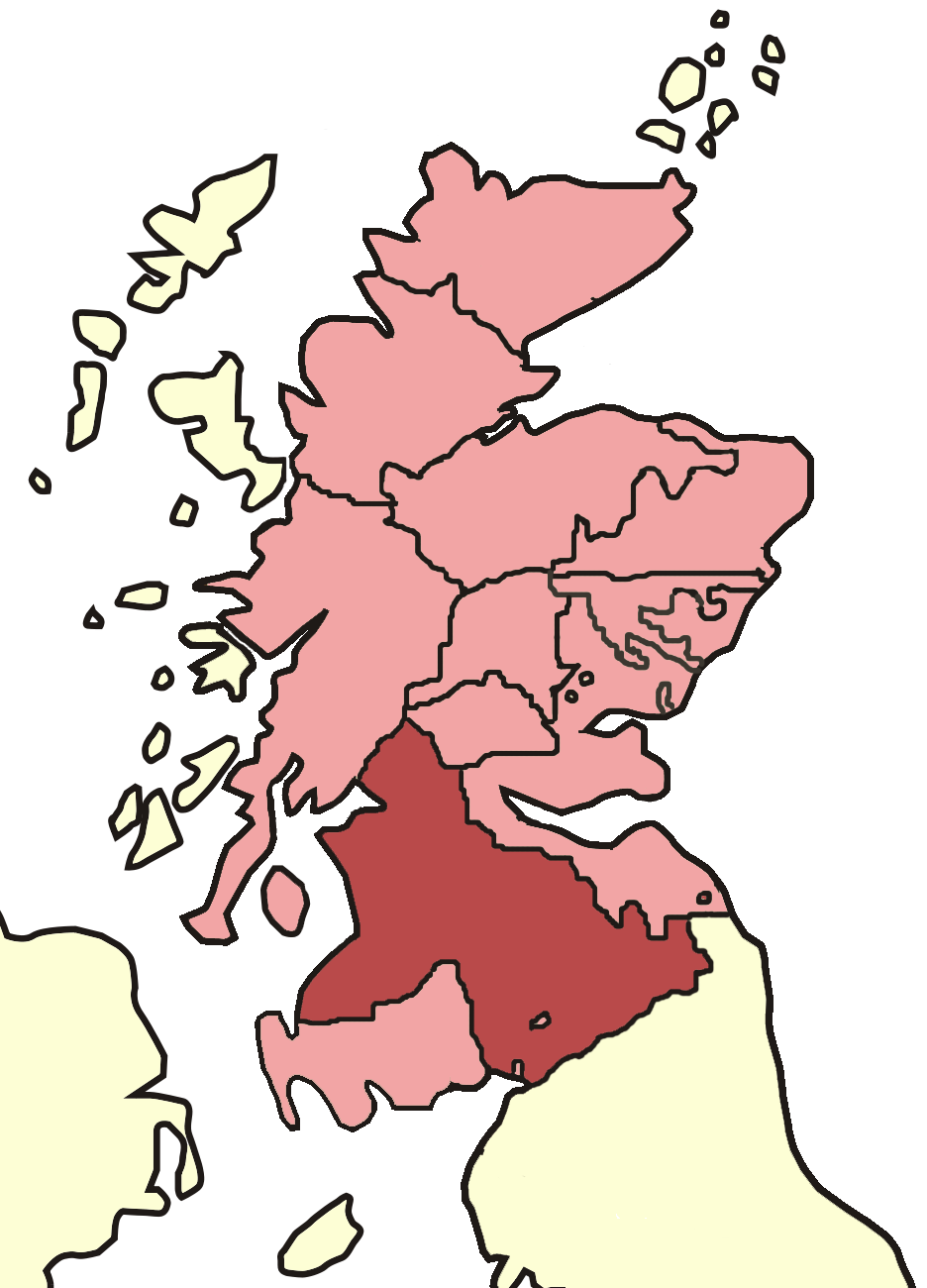
Skene's map of Scottish bishoprics in the reign of David I (reigned 1124–1153).

The Archdiocese of Glasgow was one of the thirteen (after 1633 fourteen) dioceses of the Scottish Christian church. It was the second largest diocese in the Kingdom of Scotland, including Clydesdale, Teviotdale, parts of Tweeddale, Liddesdale, Annandale, Nithsdale, Cunninghame, Kyle, and Strathgryfe, as well as Lennox, Carrick and the part of Galloway known as Desnes.

Glasgow became an archbishopric in 1492, eventually securing the dioceses of Galloway, Argyll and the Isles as suffragans. The Church of Scotland ceased its allegiance to Rome in 1560, but continued appointing bishops intermittently until 1689, when episcopacy was abolished in the Church of Scotland. Since then, The Scottish Episcopal Church has continued appointing bishops to the diocese (no longer an archdiocese since 1724), which was merged with the Diocese of Galloway in 1837. A Roman Catholic jurisdiction named after the medieval archdiocese was also established in 1878.

== History ==
The diocese of Glasgow became important in the 12th century. It was organized by the Catholic king David I of Scotland and John, Bishop of Glasgow. There had been an earlier religious site the exact age of which is unknown. According to doubtful hagiographical tradition, this ecclesiastical site had been established by Saint Kentigern. The bishopric became one of the largest and wealthiest in the Kingdom of Scotland, bringing wealth and status to the town. Somewhere between 1175 and 1178 this position was strengthened even further when Bishop Jocelin obtained for the episcopal settlement the status of burgh from King William the Lion, allowing the settlement to expand with the benefits of trading monopolies and other legal guarantees. Sometime between 1189 and 1195 this status was supplemented by an annual fair, which survives to this day as the Glasgow Fair.

Until 1560, when practice of the Catholic faith was suppressed by act of the Parliament of Scotland, nearly all the bishops of Glasgow took an active share in the government of the country; whether as chancellors or treasurers of the kingdom or as members of regency during the minority of a sovereign. Robert Wishart (consecrated 1272, d. 1316) was conspicuous for his patriotism during the Scottish War of Independence from England, and was the close friend of William Wallace and Robert Bruce. William Turnbull (consecrated 1447, d. 1454), obtained in 1450 from Pope Nicholas V the charter of foundation for the University of Glasgow.

On 9 January 1492, Pope Innocent VIII raised the see to metropolitan rank, attaching to it the suffragan dioceses of Argyle, Dunblane, Dunkeld, and Galloway. James Beaton, nephew of the celebrated Cardinal David Beaton, was the fourth and last archbishop of the old hierarchy.

In 1560, eight years after his nomination, he was forced to retire to France, where he acted as confidential agent of Mary, Queen of Scots, and later openly as ambassador for James VI, till his death in Paris, 25 April 1603. He carried away with him the diocesan records, two of which deserve special mention: (1) "Registrum Vetus Ecclesiae Cathedralis Glasguensis", in handwriting of the twelfth and thirteenth centuries, and (2) "Liber Ruber Ecclesiae Glasguensis", with entries from about 1400 to 1476. These, along with other records, were in 1843 printed in a volume for the Maitland Club under the title: "Registrum Episcopatus Glasguensis: Munimenta Ecclesiae Metropolitanae Glasguensis a sede restauratâ saeculo ineunte XII ad reformatam religionem". A more splendid memorial of those times still remains in the old cathedral of St. Mungo, which was begun by Bishop Jocelin (consecrated 1175, d. 1199) and received its last additions from Archbishop Robert Blackadder (consecrated 1484, d. 1508).

== Restoration ==
In 1828, as part of the Restoration of the Scottish hierarchy, the Holy See erected the Western District or Vicariate of Scotland, and the first vicar Apostolic to reside in Glasgow was Andrew Scott, Bishop of Erythrae (b. 1772, d, 1846). He was succeeded by John Murdoch, Bishop of Castabala (b. 1796, d. 1865) and John Gray, Bishop of Hypsopolis (b. 1817, d. 1872). On the resignation of Bishop Gray in 1869 Charles Petre Eyre (b. 1817, d. 1902) was consecrated Archbishop of Anazarba and appointed administrator Apostolic. On the Restoration of the Scottish hierarchy by Pope Leo XIII, 4 March 1878, the Archbishopric of Glasgow was re-established, and Archbishop Eyre was transferred to the restored see.

== Parishes ==
Parishes listed by deanery:

Annandale

- Annan
- Applegarth
- Brydekirk (St Brigit)
- Carruthers
- Castlemilk
- Corrie
- Cummertrees
- Dalton Magna
- Dalton Parva
- Dornock
- Dryfesdale (St Cuthbert)
- Ecclefechan
- Gretna
- Hoddom
- Hutton Magna
- Hutton Parva
- Johnstone
- Kirkconnell (St Connall) independent parsonage
- Kirkpatrick Fleming (St Patrick)
- Kirkpatrick Juxta (St Patick)
- Lochmaben
- Luce
- Middlebie
- Moffat
- Mouswald
- Pennersaughs
- Redkirk (St Patrick)
- Ruthwell
- Sibbaldbie (St James)
- Trailtrow
- Tundergarth
- Wamphray

Carrick

- Ballantrae (St Cuthbert)
- Colmonell or Kilcolmonell (St Colmán Elo)
- Dailly (St Ciaran)
- Girvan
- Kirkbride (St Brigit)
- Kirkmichael (St Michael)
- Kirkoswald (St Oswald)
- Maybole
- Straiton

Dessenes

- Colmonell (St Colmán Elo)
- Colvend
- Kirkbean (St Bean)
- Kirkbride or Blaikit (St Brigit)
- Kirkgunzeon (St Finian)
- Kirkpatrick Durham (St Patrick)
- Kirkpatrick Irongray (St Patrick)
- Lochrutton
- New Abbey
- Southwick
- Terregles
- Urr (St Constantine)

Eskdale

- Canonbie
- Eskdalemuir
- Ewes (St Martin)
- Kirkandrews on Esk (St Andrew)
- Overkirk of Ewes (St Cuthbert)
- Staplegorton
- Wauchope
- Westerkirk

Kyle and Cunningham

- Ardrossan
- Auchinleck
- Ayr
- Barnweill
- Beith
- Coylton
- Craigie
- Cumbrae
- Dalmellington
- Dalry
- Dalrymple
- Dreghorn
- Dundonald (St Giles)
- Dunlop
- Fenwick
- Galston
- Irvine
- Kilbirnie (St Brendan)
- Kilmarnock (St Ernan)
- Kilmaurs (St Maura)
- Kilwinning
- Largs (St Columba)
- Loudoun
- Mauchline
- Monkton (St Cuthbert)
- New Cumnock
- Ochiltree
- Old Cumnock
- Pierston
- Prestwick St Nicholas (St Nicholas)
- Riccarton
- St Quivox
- Stevenson (St Monachus)
- Stewarton
- Symington
- Tarbolton
- West Kilbride (St Brigit)

Lanark

- Biggar
- Carluke (St Loesuc ?)
- Carmichael (St Michael ?)
- Carnwath
- Carstairs
- Covington
- Crawford (St Constantine)
- Crawfordjohn
- Culter
- Dolphinton
- Douglas
- Dunsyre
- East Kilbride (St Brigit)
- Lamington (St Finian ?)
- Lanark (St Kentigern)
- Lesmahagow (St Fechin)
- Libberton
- Nemphlar
- Pettinain
- Quothquhan
- Roberton
- Stonehouse
- Symington
- Thankerton (St John)
- Walston
- Wandel
- Wiston

Lennox

- Antermony
- Baldernock
- Balfron
- Bonhill
- Buchanan (St Kentigern)
- Campsie
- Cardross
- Drymen (St Columba ?)
- Dumbarton
- Fintry
- Killearn
- Kilmaronock (St Ronan)
- Kilsyth
- Kirkintilloch
- Luss (St Kessog)
- New Kilpatrick
- Old Kilpatrick
- Rhu
- Rosneath
- Strathblane

Nithsdale

- Caerlaverock
- Closeburn (St Osbern ?)
- Dalgarnock
- Dumfries
- Dumgree
- Dunscore (St Cairbre)
- Durisdeer
- Garvald
- Glencairn
- Holywood
- Kirkbride (St Brigit)
- Kirkconnell (St Conall)
- Kirkmahoe (St Kentigern)
- Morton
- Penpont
- Sanquhar
- Tinwald
- Torthorwald
- Trailflat
- Troqueer
- Tynron

Peebles

- Broughton (St Lolan)
- Drumelzier
- Eddleston
- Ettrick
- Glenholm (St Cuthbert)
- Innerleithen
- Kailzie
- Kilbucho (St Beoga)
- Kirkurd
- Lyne
- Manor
- Newlands
- Peebles
- Skirling
- Stobo
- Traquair
- West Linton
- Yarrow (St Mary)

Rutherglen

- Avondale (St Mary)
- Blantyre
- Bothwell (St Bride)
- Cadder
- Cambuslang
- Cambusnethan
- Carmunnock
- Cathcart (St Oswald)
- Dalserf or Machanshire
- Dalziel
- Eaglesham
- Eastwood
- Erskine
- Glasgow (St Kentigern)
- Glassford
- Govan (St Constantine)
- Hamilton
- Houston (St Peter)
- Inchinnan
- Inverkip
- Kilbarchan (St Berchan)
- Killellan (St Fillan)
- Kilmacolm (St Columba)
- Lochwinnoch (St Finan)
- Mearns
- Neilston
- New Monkland
- Old Monkland
- Paisley (St Mirren)
- Pollock
- Port Glasgow
- Renfrew
- Rutherglen
- Shotts
- Torrance

Teviotdale

- Abbotrule
- Ancrum
- Ashkirk
- Bedrule
- Bowden
- Castletown (St Martin)
- Cavers Magna
- Cavers Parva
- Crailing
- Eckford
- Ettleton
- Galashiels
- Hassendean (St Kentigern)
- Hawick
- Hobkirk
- Hownam
- Jedburgh
- Kelso
- Lampitlaw
- Lilliesleaf
- Linton
- Longnewton
- Maxton
- Maxwell
- Melrose
- Minto
- Morebattle
- Mow
- Nisbet
- Old Roxburgh
- Oxnam
- Rankilburn
- Roxburgh (Holy Sepulchre)
- Roxburgh (St James)
- Selkirk Abbatis
- Selkirk Regis
- Southdean
- Sprouston
- St Boswells (St Bosil)
- Wheelkirk
- Wilton
- Yetholm
