= Thomas Bruce, 1st Baron of Clackmannan =

Scottish nobleman (died before 1348)

Thomas Bruce
- Years active: 1334
- Spouse: Marjorie Charteris
- Children: Robert

Sir Thomas Bruce, 1st (feudal) Baron of Clackmannan (fl. 1334) was the first Baron of Clackmannan.

King David II of Scotland, near the end of his life, appears to have regarded Thomas as the next most senior member of the Bruce family, meaning that he was believed to be a male line descendant of Robert de Brus, but his exact relationship to the royal Bruces is unclear. It has been suggested that he was the illegitimate son of Robert the Bruce or Edward Bruce, but there is no clear evidence for this; he may have belonged to a more distant branch of the family.

Thomas was granted land in Clackmannan by King Robert II of Scotland after organizing a revolt against the English in 1334. He married Marjorie Charteris and it is from this line which most Bruces descend, including the current Chief of Clan Bruce, Andrew Bruce. Thomas and Marjorie's children included Robert Bruce.
