= Andrew Scott (bishop) =

Roman Catholic bishop (1772–1846)

The Right Reverend Andrew Scott
- Vicar Apostolic of the Western District
- Church: Roman Catholic Church
- In office: 1832–1845
- Predecessor: Ranald MacDonald
- Successor: John Murdoch
- Other post: Titular Bishop of Erythrae (1827–1846)
- Previous posts: Coadjutor Vicar Apostolic of the Western District (1827–1832)

Orders
- Ordination: 25 March 1795 by George Hay
- Consecration: 21 September 1828 by Alexander Paterson

Personal details
- Born: 15 February 1772 Chapelford, Banffshire, Scotland
- Died: 4 December 1846 (aged 74) Greenock, Scotland
- Education: Scalan
- Alma mater: Scots College, Douai

Andrew Scott (15 February 1772 – 4 December 1846) was a Roman Catholic bishop who served as the Vicar Apostolic of the Western District of Scotland from 1832 to 1845.

== Education and early ministry ==
He was born in Chapelford, Enzie, Banffshire on 15 February 1772. His family had been farmers at Chapelford for hundreds of years. Having manifested a desire from an early age to enter the clergy, he was admitted to the Seminary of Scalan on 25 January 1785 and continued his studies at the Scots College, Douai. In 1793, he was compelled to return home at the outbreak of the French Revolution when the college was abandoned. He resumed his studies in Scotland under the direction of Rev. John Farquharson and was ordained to the priesthood at Aberdeen by Bishop Hay on 25 March 1795.Immediately after ordination, he was appointed to the mission at Dee Castle in Aberdeenshire and in 1800 was sent to Huntly. He came to Glasgow in 1805 where initially there were few Catholics.

He built St Andrew's Cathedral, Glasgow (1814–16), which still stands on the River Clyde, to accommodate the growing number of Catholics in the town. In Glasgow, he built schools which could be used as chapels on Sunday, and meeting places during the week. He pursued and won a libel case against a Protestant activist, the case of Scott v McGavin, 25 June 1821.

== Episcopate ==
He was appointed the Coadjutor Vicar Apostolic of the Western District and Titular Bishop of Erythrae by the Holy See on 13 February 1827, and consecrated to the Episcopate at St Andrew's Cathedral, Glasgow on 21 September 1828. The principal consecrator was Bishop Alexander Paterson, Vicar Apostolic of the Eastern District of Scotland, and the principal co-consecrators were Bishop Ranald MacDonald, Vicar Apostolic of the Western District of Scotland and Bishop Thomas Penswick, Vicar Apostolic of the Northern District of England. He continued to reside in Glasgow and took charge of the lowland portion of the Western District.

On the death of Bishop Ranald MacDonald on 20 September 1832, he automatically succeeded as the Vicar Apostolic of the Western District. After John Murdoch was appointed as his Coadjutor Vicar Apostolic (assistant Bishop) on 4 June 1833, Bishop Scott was able to concentrate on the Highland part of the Western District, operating from Greenock and resigning the charge of Glasgow to Bishop Murdoch. While he had concentrated on schools in the Lowlands and Glasgow, in the western Highlands, he attempted to restore liturgy by building churches. He built new buildings at Badenoch, Bornish, Fort Augustus, Morar and Glencoe.

He resigned on 15 October 1845. The number of practising Catholics in the area increased from 1,000 to 70,000 during his forty-year tenure, largely due to Irish immigration. He died on 4 December 1846, aged 74, and was buried in St Mary's Church, Abercromby Street, Glasgow.

Catholic Church titles
Preceded by Ranald MacDonald	Vicar Apostolic of the Western District; 1832–1845	Succeeded by John Murdoch
