= Alternative successions to the English and British Crown =

British history provides several opportunities for alternative claimants to the English and later British Crown to arise, and historical scholars have on occasion traced to present times the heirs of those alternative claims.

Throughout this article, the names of "would-have-been" monarchs are in italics.

== Abdication of Richard II ==
Richard II abdicated in favour of Henry Bolingbroke on 29 September 1399. However, Henry was not next in the line to the throne; the heir presumptive was Edmund Mortimer, Earl of March, who descended from Edward III's second surviving son, Lionel of Antwerp, Duke of Clarence, whereas Henry's father, John of Gaunt, was Edward's third surviving son.

Map of succession

Edward III
Edward the Black Prince	Lionel of Antwerp, Duke of Clarence
Richard II	Philippa, 5th Countess of Ulster
Roger Mortimer, 4th Earl of March
Edmund Mortimer, 5th Earl of March	Anne de Mortimer
Richard of York, 3rd Duke of York
Edward IV

Had Edmund inherited instead, the alternative succession would have been short-lived, for it re-united with the historical crown when Edward IV was declared king in 1461.

1. Edward III
2. Edward the Black Prince, first son of Edward III
3. Richard II of England, second son of Edward, the Black Prince
4. Lionel of Antwerp, Duke of Clarence, third son (second son to survive infancy) of Edward III
5. Philippa Plantagenet, 5th Countess of Ulster, only child of Lionel
6. Roger Mortimer, 4th Earl of March, first son of Philippa
7. Edmund Mortimer, 5th Earl of March, first son of Roger, died without issue
8. Anne de Mortimer, first daughter of Roger, predeceased her brother Edmund
9. Richard of York, 3rd Duke of York, only son of Anne
10. Edward IV, first son of Richard

== Descendants of George Plantagenet, Duke of Clarence ==
This line's claim to the Crown is based upon the argument that Edward IV was not the son of Richard of York, 3rd Duke of York, and thus had no legitimate claim to the Crown. Therefore, when Richard was killed at the Battle of Wakefield, his claim passed first to his eldest legitimate son, Edmund, Earl of Rutland, who was executed shortly after the battle, and then to George, Duke of Clarence. Another point is that Henry VI passed a law in 1470 that should both he and his son Edward of Westminster die without further legitimate male issue, the crown was to pass to Clarence, as Henry had placed an attainder upon Edward IV. When Henry VI and Edward both died in 1471, Clarence became the legal heir of the House of Lancaster.

The current descendant of this line is Simon Abney-Hastings, 15th Earl of Loudoun. The line of succession is as follows:

1. George Plantagenet, Duke of Clarence, third son (second "legitimate" son) of Richard of York, 3rd Duke of York
2. Edward Plantagenet, 17th Earl of Warwick, first son of George
3. Margaret Pole, 8th Countess of Salisbury, daughter of George, succeeded her childless brother Edward
4. Henry Pole, 1st Baron Montagu, first son of Margaret
5. Henry Pole, second son of Henry, his elder brother Thomas died in childhood
6. Catherine Hastings, first daughter, succeeded her childless brother Henry
7. Henry Hastings, 3rd Earl of Huntingdon, first son of Catherine
8. George Hastings, 4th Earl of Huntingdon, second son of Catherine, succeeded his childless brother Henry
9. Francis Hastings, first son of George
10. Henry Hastings, 5th Earl of Huntingdon, only son of Francis
11. Ferdinando Hastings, 6th Earl of Huntingdon, first son of Henry
12. Theophilus Hastings, 7th Earl of Huntingdon, only son of Ferdinando
13. George Hastings, 8th Earl of Huntingdon, second son of Theophilus, his elder brother died in childhood
14. Theophilus Hastings, 9th Earl of Huntingdon, third son of Theophilus, his elder brother George had no legitimate children
15. Francis Hastings, 10th Earl of Huntingdon, first son of Theophilus, 9th Earl
16. Elizabeth Rawdon, 16th Baroness Botreaux, daughter of Theophilus, her brother Francis had no legitimate children
17. Francis Rawdon-Hastings, 1st Marquess of Hastings, first son of Elizabeth
18. George Rawdon-Hastings, 2nd Marquess of Hastings, eldest legitimate son of Francis
19. Paulyn Rawdon-Hastings, 3rd Marquess of Hastings, first son of George
20. Henry Rawdon-Hastings, 4th Marquess of Hastings, second son of George, his brother Paulyn died in childhood
21. Edith Rawdon-Hastings, 10th Countess of Loudoun, first daughter of George, succeeded her childless brother Henry
22. Charles Rawdon-Hastings, 11th Earl of Loudoun, first son of Edith, died without issue
23. Paulyn Abney-Hastings, second son of Edith, succeeded his childless brother Charles
24. Edith Maud Abney-Hastings, 12th Countess of Loudoun, first daughter of Paulyn
25. Ian Huddleston Abney-Hastings, Lord Mauchline, only son of Edith, died in World War II without issue
26. Barbara Abney-Hastings, 13th Countess of Loudoun, first daughter of Edith, succeeded her childless brother Ian
27. Michael Abney-Hastings, 14th Earl of Loudoun, eldest son of Barbara
28. Simon Abney-Hastings, 15th Earl of Loudoun, eldest son of Michael
29. The Hon. Marcus William Abney-Hastings, younger brother of Simon (heir presumptive)

Subsequent Earls of Huntingdon descended from Sir Edward Hastings (1541–1603?), the fourth son of Francis Hastings, 2nd Earl of Huntingdon and Catherine Pole after the male line of their third son, George Hastings, 4th Earl of Huntingdon (1540 – 3 December 1604) died out with Francis Hastings, 10th Earl of Huntingdon.

Dukes of Exeter, Marquesses of Northampton, Earls of Huntingdon, and Earls of Wilmington family tree

Robert; 1000–1035; Duke of Normandy
Adelaide of Normandy c. 1030–before 1090; Countess of Aumale	William the Conqueror c. 1028–1087; King of England
Earl of Huntingdon (1st creation), 1065; Earl of Northampton (1st creation), 1071
Waltheof d. 1076; Earl of Northumbria, 1st Earl of Huntingdon, 1st Earl of Northampton	Judith of Lens; 1054/1055–c. 1090
David I c. 1084–1153; King of Alba	Maud c. 1074–1130; 2nd Countess of Huntingdon, 2nd Countess of Northampton, Queen of Scotland	Simon I de Senlis d. 1111–1113; 2nd Earl of Huntingdon, 2nd Earl of Northampton jure uxoris
Henry of Scotland; 1114–1152; 3rd Earl of Huntingdon, Earl of Northumbria	Simon II de Senlis c. 1098–1153; 4th Earl of Huntingdon, 3rd Earl of Northampton
Malcolm IV; 1141–1165; King of Alba, 5th Earl of Huntingdon	William I (the Lion) c. 1142–1214; King of Alba, 6th Earl of Huntingdon	David; 1152–1219; 8th Earl of Huntingdon, Earl of Northumbria	Simon III de Senlis c. 1138–1184; 7th Earl of Huntingdon, 4th Earl of Northampton
Earldom of Northampton (1st creation) reverted to the Crown, 1184
John of Scotland; 1207–1237; 9th Earl of Huntingdon, Earl of Chester
Earldom of Huntingdon (1st creation) extinct, 1237 and later reverted to the Crown
Earl of Huntingdon (2nd creation), 1337
William de Clinton c. 1304–1354; Earl of Huntingdon, Baron Clinton
Earl of Northampton (2nd creation), 1337	Earldom of Huntingdon (2nd creation) extinct, 1354	Earl of Huntingdon (3rd creation for life), 1377
William de Bohun c. 1312 – 1373; Earl of Hereford, Earl of Essex, 1st Earl of Northampton	Edward III; 1312–1377; King of England	Guichard (IV) d'Angle c. 1305/1315–1380; Earl of Huntingdon
Earldom of Huntingdon (3rd creation) extinct, 1380
Humphrey de Bohun; 1342–1373; Earl of Hereford, Earl of Essex, 2nd Earl of Northampton	Joan of Kent c. 1328–1385	Edward of Woodstock "The Black Prince; 1330–1376	John of Gaunt; 1340–1399; Duke of Lancaster	Thomas of Woodstock; 1355–1397; Duke of Gloucester
Earldom of Northampton (2nd creation) abeyant, 1373
Earl of Huntingdon (4th creation), 1388; Duke of Exeter (1st creation), 1397	Earl of Northampton (2nd creation restored), 1384	Duke of Exeter (2nd creation), 1416	Earl of Northampton (3rd creation), 1399
John Holland c. 1352–1400; 1st Duke of Exeter, 1st Earl of Huntingdon	Richard II; 1367–c. 1400; King of England	Henry Bolingbroke c. 1367 – 1413; 3rd Earl of Northampton, later King Henry IV	Thomas Beaufort c. 1377–1426; Duke of Exeter; Earl of Dorset	Anne of Gloucester; 1383–1438; Countess of Northampton
Dukedom of Exeter (1st creation) and Earldom of Huntingdon (4th creation) forfeit, 1400	Earldom of Northampton (2nd creation) merged in the crown, 1399	Dukedom of Exeter (2nd creation) extinct, 1426	Earldom of Northampton (3rd creation) extinct, 1438
Earldom of Huntingdon (4th creation) restored, 1416; Duke of Exeter (1st creation restored or 3rd creation), 1444
John Holland; 1395–1447; 2nd Duke of Exeter, 2nd Earl of Huntingdon
Henry Holland; 1430–1475; 3rd Duke of Exeter, 3rd Earl of Huntingdon	Edward IV; 1421–1471; King of England	Elizabeth Woodville c. 1437–1492
Dukedom of Exeter (1st/3rd creation) and Earldom of Huntingdon (4th creation) forfeit, 1461
Earl of Huntingdon (5th creation), 1471	Earl of Huntingdon (6th creation), 1479
Thomas Grey; 1455–1501; Earl of Huntingdon, Marquess of Dorset	Mary Woodville c. 1456–1481	William Herbert; 1451–1491; Earl of Huntingdon, Earl of Pembroke
Earldom of Huntingdon (5th creation) surrendered, 1475	Earldom of Huntingdon (6th creation) extinct, 1491
Earl of Huntingdon (7th creation), 1529
Thomas Parr; 1478–1517	George Hastings; 1488–1544; 1st Earl of Huntingdon
Baron Parr of Kendall, 1539; Marquess of Northampton (1st creation), Baron Hart, 1543	Baron Hastings of Loughborough, 1558
Henry VIII; 1491–1547; King of England	Catherine Parr; 1512–1548	William Parr; 1513–1571; Marquess of Northampton, Earl of Essex, 1st Baron Parr, 1st Baron Hart	Francis Hastings; 1514–1561; 2nd Earl of Huntingdon	Edward Hastings c. 1521–1572; Baron Hastings of Loughborough
Marquessate of Northampton (1st creation), Earldom of Essex (7th creation) forfeit, 1554; restored, 1559; extinct, 1571	Barony Hastings of Loughborough extinct, 1572
Earl of Northampton, (4th creation), 1604	Baron Compton, 1572
Henry Howard; 1540–1614; Earl of Northampton	Henry Compton; 1544–1589; 1st Baron Compton	Frances Anne Hastings; 1533–1574	Henry Hastings; 1536–1595; 3rd Earl of Huntingdon	George Hastings; 1540–1604; 4th Earl of Huntingdon	Edward Hastings; 1541–1603
Earldom of Northampton (4th creation) extinct, 1614
Earl of Northampton (5th creation), 1618
William Compton d. 1630; 1st Earl of Northampton, 2nd Baron Compton	Francis Hastings; 1560–1595	Henry c. 1555–1640
Henry Hastings; 1586–1643; 5th Earl of Huntingdon
Spencer Compton; 1601–1643; 2nd Earl of Northampton, 3rd Baron Compton	Ferdinando Hastings; 1609–1656; 6th Earl of Huntingdon	Henry b. 1605
James Compton; 1622–1681; 3rd Earl of Northampton, 4th Baron Compton	Theophilus Hastings; 1650–1701; 7th Earl of Huntingdon	Richard; 1645–1714
Baron Wilmington, 1728; Earl of Wilmington and Viscount Pevensey, 1730
George Compton; 1664–1727; 4th Earl of Northampton, 5th Baron Compton	Spencer Compton c. 1674 – 1743; Earl of Wilmington, Viscount Pevensey, Baron Wilmington	George Hastings; 1677–1705; 8th Earl of Huntingdon
Earldom of Wilmington, Vicountcy Pevensey, and Barony Wilmington extinct, 1743
James Compton; 1687–1754; 5th Earl of Northampton, 6th Baron Compton	George Compton; 1692–1758; 6th Earl of Northampton	Charles Compton	Theophilus Hastings c. 1696–1746; 9th Earl of Huntingdon	Henry; 1701–1786
Charlotte Townshend d. 1770; Viscountess Townshend, Baroness Ferrers of Chartley, 7th Baroness Compton	Charles Compton; 1737–1763; 7th Earl of Northampton	Francis Hastings; 1729–1789; 10th Earl of Huntingdon	Theophilus Hastings; 1728–1804; 11th Earl of Huntingdon de jure	George; 1735–1802
Earldom of Huntingdon dormant/abeyant, 1804
George Townshend; 1753–1811; Marquess Townshend, Earl of Leicester, Viscount Townshend, Baron Townshend, Baron Ferrers of Chartley, 8th Baron Compton	Spencer Compton; 1760–1828; 8th Earl of Northampton
Marquess of Northampton (2nd creation), Earl Compton and Baron Wilmington, 1812	Earldom of Huntingdon claim restored, 1819
George Townshend (1778–1885); Marquess Townshend, Earl of Leicester, Viscount Townshend, Baron Townshend, Baron Ferrers of Chartley, 9th Baron Compton	Charles Compton; 1760–1828; 1st Marquess of Northampton, etc., 9th Earl of Northampton	Hans "Francis" Hastings; 1779–1828; 12th Earl of Huntingdon
Barony Compton abeyant, 1855
Spencer Joshua Alwyne Compton; 1790–1851; 2nd Marquess of Northampton, etc., 10th Earl of Northampton
Charles Douglas-Compton; 1816–1877; 3rd Marquess of Northampton, etc., 11th Earl of Northampton	William Compton; 1818–1897; 4th Marquess of Northampton, etc., 12th Earl of Northampton	Francis Theophilus Henry Hastings; 1808–1875; 13th Earl of Huntingdon	George; 1814–1876
Francis Power Plantagenet Hastings; 1841–1885; 14th Earl of Huntingdon
William George Spencer Scott Compton; 1851–1913; 5th Marquess of Northampton, etc., 13th Earl of Northampton	Warner Francis John Plantagenet Hastings; 1868–1939; 15th Earl of Huntingdon	Aubrey; 1878–1929	Hans; 1865–1933
William Bingham Compton; 1885–1978; 6th Marquess of Northampton, etc., 14th Earl of Northampton	Francis John Clarence Westenra Plantagenet Hastings; 1901–1990; 16th Earl of Huntingdon	Peter Hastings-Bass; 1920–1964	George; 1905–1981
Spencer Douglas David Compton b. 1946; 7th Marquess of Northampton, etc., 15th Earl of Northampton	William Edward Robin Hood Hastings-Bass b. 1948; 17th Earl of Huntingdon	John Hastings-Bass b. 1954	George; 1938–2005
Heir presumptive to the Earldom of Huntingdon
Daniel Bingham Compton b. 1973 styled Earl Compton	Adam b. 1977
Heir apparent to the Marquessate of Northampton	Second Heir presumptive to the Earldom of Huntingdon

== Descendants of Mary Tudor, Queen of France ==
Parliament's Third Succession Act granted Henry VIII the right to bequeath the crown in his Will. His Will specified that, in default of heirs to his children, the throne was to pass to the children of the daughters of his younger sister Mary Tudor, Queen of France, bypassing the line of his elder sister Margaret Tudor, represented by the Catholic Mary, Queen of Scots. Edward VI confirmed this by letters patent. The legitimate and legal heir of Elizabeth I was therefore Anne Stanley, Countess of Castlehaven (the marriage of Lady Katherine Grey having been annulled, and her children declared illegitimate, by Elizabeth I).

Hypothetical succession in the female line from Henry VII, through his daughter Mary and her second marriage

Henry VII
Henry VIII	Mary Tudor, Queen of France
Edward VI	Mary I	Elizabeth I
Henry	Frances	Eleanor
Jane	Katherine	Mary	Margaret
Edward	Thomas	Ferdinando
Anne	Frances
George	John
Margaret	John
George	Elizabeth	Scroop
George	Anne
Henry	George
Henry	Elizabeth	George
George
Victor
George
George
Caroline

Her succession, under this theory, follows:

1. Henry VIII of England
2. Edward VI, only son of Henry VIII
3. Mary I, eldest daughter of Henry VIII
4. Elizabeth I, second daughter of Henry VIII
5. Mary Tudor, Queen of France, second daughter of Henry VII
6. Lady Eleanor Brandon, second daughter, third line of Mary
7. Lady Margaret Clifford, only daughter, third line of Eleanor
8. Ferdinando Stanley, 5th Earl of Derby, first son of Margaret
9. Anne Stanley, Countess of Castlehaven, first daughter of Ferdinando
10. George Brydges, 6th Baron Chandos, first son of Anne
11. Margaret Brydges, first daughter of George
12. Sir George Brydges Skipwith, 3rd Baronet, first son of Margaret
13. Elizabeth Brownlow, first daughter of Margaret, succeeded their childless brother George
14. George Brownlow Doughty, first son of Elizabeth
15. Henry Doughty, only child of George
16. Henry Doughty, only son of Henry
17. Elizabeth Doughty, only daughter of Henry Doughty Sr

Since Lady Anne Stanley's line is thought to have become extinct with the death of Elizabeth Doughty, the line then passes to the descendants of Lady Anne's sister, Lady Frances Stanley:

9. Lady Frances Stanley, second daughter of Ferdinando
10. John Egerton, 2nd Earl of Bridgewater, first son of Frances
11. John Egerton, 3rd Earl of Bridgewater, first son of John
12. Scroop Egerton, 1st Duke of Bridgewater, third son of John
13. Lady Anne Egerton, first daughter of Scroop
14. George Villiers, 4th Earl of Jersey, only child of Anne
15. George Child Villiers, 5th Earl of Jersey, first son of George, 4th Earl of Jersey
16. George Child Villiers, 6th Earl of Jersey, first son of George, 5th Earl of Jersey
17. Victor Child Villiers, 7th Earl of Jersey, only son of George, 6th Earl of Jersey
18. George Child Villiers, 8th Earl of Jersey, first son of Victor, 7th Earl of Jersey
19. George Child Villiers, 9th Earl of Jersey, first son of George, 8th Earl of Jersey
20. Lady Caroline Child Villiers, only child of George's first marriage

Lady Caroline's heir-apparent is her son Timothy Elliot-Murray-Kynynmound, 7th Earl of Minto.

Although the 9th Earl of Jersey had sons from a third marriage, he had been divorced from his first wife, who was still alive when he married his third. Under a strict adherence to the succession laws and customs as they existed in 1603 (for it is argued that no laws passed by Parliament since 1603 are legitimate, as the heirs did not summon those Parliaments, nor did those laws receive valid royal assent to become law), the 9th Earl of Jersey's divorce was not valid, and therefore both his remarriage during his ex-wife's lifetime was null and void, and the children of his third marriage illegitimate. Consequently, the current holder of the Stanley claim to the throne of England is the only child of the 9th Earl's first marriage, Lady Caroline Ogilvy (née Child Villiers).

== Descendants of Edward Seymour, Viscount Beauchamp and Lady Katherine Grey ==
Although the marriage of Lady Katherine Grey and Edward Seymour, 1st Earl of Hertford, was annulled as illegal in 1562, and her children consequently rendered illegitimate, James I regarded the Seymour line as eligible heirs. This unofficial rehabilitation of the Seymours placed them ahead of the Stanleys in James's opinion. In 2012, Mary Freeman-Grenville, 12th Lady Kinloss was listed as the heir to the Mary Tudor claim rather than Frances Stanley's descendants.

Her succession follows:

1. Henry VIII
2. Edward VI, only son of Henry
3. Mary I, eldest daughter of Henry
4. Elizabeth I, second daughter of Henry
5. Mary Tudor, Queen of France, third daughter of Henry VII of England, younger sister of Henry VIII of England
6. Lady Frances Brandon, first daughter of Mary
7. Lady Katherine Grey, second daughter of Frances
8. Edward Seymour, Viscount Beauchamp, first son of Katherine
9. Edward Seymour, Lord Beauchamp, first son of Edward
10. William Seymour, 2nd Duke of Somerset, second son of Edward, succeeded his childless brother Edward
11. Henry Seymour, Lord Beauchamp, third son of William, his elder brothers William and Robert died in childhood
12. William Seymour, 3rd Duke of Somerset, only son of Henry
13. Lady Elizabeth Seymour, only daughter of Henry
14. Charles Bruce, 3rd Earl of Ailesbury, second son of Elizabeth, his elder brother Robert died in childhood
15. Lady Mary Bruce, first daughter, succeeded their childless brothers Robert and George
16. James Brydges, 3rd Duke of Chandos, only son of Mary
17. Lady Anne Elizabeth Brydges, only child of James
18. Richard Temple-Nugent-Brydges-Chandos-Grenville, 2nd Duke of Buckingham and Chandos, first son of Anne
19. Richard Temple-Nugent-Brydges-Chandos-Grenville, 3rd Duke of Buckingham and Chandos, only son of Richard
20. Mary Morgan-Grenville, 11th Lady Kinloss, first daughter of Richard
21. Luis Chandos Francis Temple Morgan-Grenville, second son of Mary, succeeded their childless brother Richard
22. Mary Freeman-Grenville, 12th Lady Kinloss, first daughter of Luis
23. Bevil David Stewart Chandos Freeman-Grenville, only son of Mary
24. Teresa Freeman-Grenville, 13th Lady Kinloss, first daughter of Mary

Lady Kinloss's heir-presumptive is her sister Hester Josephine Anne Freeman-Grenville, who is married to Peter Haworth and has three sons.

== Continuation of the House of Stuart ==
The Jacobite succession stemmed from the death of Charles II in 1685. When Charles's younger brother James, Duke of York became king as James II of England and VII of Scotland, concerns arose that James, a recent Catholic convert, would return England to Catholicism, especially after the birth of a son, James Francis Edward Stuart, who would be raised Catholic. As James had two Protestant daughters, Mary and Anne, Parliament welcomed Mary and her husband William to depose James in what became the Glorious Revolution of 1688. James was sent into exile, and his heirs were passed over by the Act of Settlement 1701, which barred Catholics from ever again becoming the monarch.

The Jacobite and Hanoverian/Windsor successions

James VI and I
Charles I	Elizabeth
Charles II	James VII and II	Mary	Henrietta	Sophia
James VIII and III	Mary II	Anne	William III	Anne	George I
Charles III	Henry I and IX	Charles Emmanuel	George II
Victor Amadeus	Frederick
Charles IV	Victor	George III
Mary II	George IV	William IV	Edward
Francis I	Ferdinand	Victoria
Mary III	Edward VII
Robert	George V
Albert	Edward VIII	George VI
Francis II	Max	Elizabeth II
Charles III
William

1. Charles I of England
2. James VII and II, second son of Charles I
3. James Francis Edward Stuart, only son of James VII and II; called "James VIII and III" by Jacobites.
4. Charles Edward Stuart, elder son of James Francis. He had no legitimate issue by his wife. He had an illegitimate daughter who has descendants, but they have no succession rights. Also known as "Charles III" by Jacobites or as "Bonnie Prince Charlie" more widely.
5. Henry Benedict Stuart, younger son of James Francis. He was a Cardinal of the Catholic Church and had no issue. Called "Henry I and IX" by Jacobites.

At Henry's death the claim passed to his second cousin twice removed, Charles Emmanuel IV of Sardinia, and then to his brother Victor Emmanuel I of Sardinia. Charles Emmanuel and Victor Emmanuel were great-great-great-grandsons of King Charles I.

1. Charles I of England
2. Henrietta of England, youngest daughter of Charles
3. Anne Marie d'Orléans, second daughter of Henrietta Anne
4. Charles Emmanuel III of Sardinia, second son of Anne Marie
5. Victor Amadeus III of Sardinia, second son of Charles Emmanuel
6. Charles Emmanuel IV of Sardinia, eldest son of Victor Amadeus
7. Victor Emmanuel I of Sardinia, second son of Victor Amadeus
8. Maria Beatrice of Savoy, eldest daughter of Victor Emmanuel
9. Francis V, Duke of Modena, elder son of Maria Beatrice
10. Archduke Ferdinand Karl Viktor of Austria-Este, younger son of Maria Beatrice, succeeded their elder brother Francis who had no surviving adult children
11. Maria Theresa of Austria-Este, only child of Ferdinand
12. Rupprecht, Crown Prince of Bavaria, eldest son of Maria Theresia
13. Albrecht, Duke of Bavaria, second son of Rupprecht, his elder brother Luitpold died in childhood
14. Franz, Duke of Bavaria, elder son of Albrecht

When Franz dies, his claim on the English and Scottish crowns will pass to his younger brother Prince Max. And after Max's death, this theoretical claim most likely will be inherited by Sophie, Hereditary Princess of Liechtenstein, daughter of Prince Max.
