= Kinloss =

Kinloss may refer to:

== Places ==
- Kinloss Township, a township in Walsh County, in the State of North Dakota, USA
- Kinloss, Scotland, a village in Moray, Scotland
- Huron-Kinloss, a township in Bruce County, in Ontario Province, Canada

== Institutions ==
=== Religious ===
- Kinloss Synagogue, a synagogue in Finchley, north London, UK
- Kinloss Abbey, a Cistercian abbey at Kinloss, Scotland

=== Transportation ===
- Kinloss railway station, a disused railway station in Kinloss, Scotland

=== Military ===
- Kinloss Barracks, a military installation for the 39 Engineers Regiment of the British Army. It is located on the Moray Firth in Scotland
- RAF Kinloss, a former RAF installation on the Moray Firth in Scotland. It has since been converted into Kinloss Barracks

== People ==
- 13th Lady Kinloss, a Scottish peer

=== Titles ===
- The Lord Kinloss, a title in the Scottish peerage

== See also ==
- Kinross, a settlement in Perth and Kinross, Scotland
- Kinross (disambiguation)
