= Teresa Freeman-Grenville, 13th Lady Kinloss =

British peeress (born 1957)

The Right Honourable The Lady Kinloss
- 13th Lady Kinloss
- Tenure: 30 September 2012 – present
- Predecessor: Mary Freeman-Grenville
- Heir-presumptive: Hon. Hester Haworth
- Born: 20 July 1957 (age 69); Tanga, Tanganyika
- Parents: Mary Freeman-Grenville, 12th Lady Kinloss; Dr Greville Greville Stewart Parker Freeman

Teresa Mary Nugent Freeman-Grenville, 13th Lady Kinloss (born 20 July 1957) is a British peeress.

She is the heir-general of Edward Seymour, Viscount Beauchamp, the older son of Lady Catherine Grey (sister of Lady Jane Grey, briefly Queen of England after the death of King Edward VI), and has thus been suggested as a claimant to the throne of England.

== Life ==
Born at Tanga, Tanganyika (now Tanzania), she is the elder of the two daughters of Mary Freeman-Grenville, 12th Lady Kinloss, by her marriage to Dr Greville Stewart Parker Freeman, later Freeman-Grenville. She is a great-great-granddaughter of Richard Plantagenet Temple-Nugent-Brydges-Chandos-Grenville, 3rd Duke of Buckingham and Chandos (1823–1889), who was also Lord Kinloss.

Upon his death, some of his titles became extinct, while others passed to cousins, and only this lordship of Kinloss was inherited by his eldest daughter, Mary. Her great-granddaughter the present Lady Kinloss is thus the senior heir-general of Edward Seymour, Viscount Beauchamp, the only son of Lady Catherine Grey, sister of Lady Jane Grey. In an alternative succession to the throne of England, based on the Will of King Henry VIII, Lady Kinloss inherits her mother's claim (never pursued) to the crown.

She was educated at Rye St Antony School (Headington, Oxford), then at York Art School, where she studied fashion. On 30 September 2012 she succeeded to the lordship of Kinloss on the death of her mother, which happened less than a year after the death of her brother, Bevil David Stewart Chandos Freeman-Grenville, Master of Kinloss (1953–2012).

Lady Kinloss lives at North View House, Sheriff Hutton, North Yorkshire, and has worked for National Milk Records since 1992. In Who's Who she states her recreations as dogs, keeping goats, and spinning and weaving.

The heir presumptive to the title is Lady Kinloss's younger sister, Hon. Hester Josephine Anne Haworth (born 1960), who married Peter Haworth in 1984 and has three sons.

== See also ==
- Alternative successions of the English crown

Peerage of Scotland
| Preceded by Mary Freeman-Grenville | Lady Kinloss; 2012–present | Incumbent |
