= Kinross (disambiguation) =

Kinross is a town in Scotland.

It may also refer to:

== Places ==
=== Australia ===
- Kinross, Western Australia a northern suburb of the city of Perth in Western Australia
- Kinross Wolaroi School, a P-12, co-educational independent school in Orange, New South Wales, Australia

=== Canada ===
- Kinross, Prince Edward Island, a settlement in Prince Edward Island
- Mount Kinross, a mountain in Alberta, part of the Victoria Cross Ranges

=== South Africa ===
- Kinross, Mpumalanga, a town in South Africa

=== United Kingdom ===
- Kinross-shire, a traditional county of which Kinross is the county town
- Perth and Kinross, a modern unitary council in Scotland
- Kinross House, a late 17th-century country house near Kinross in Perth and Kinross, Scotland

=== United States ===
- Kinross, Iowa, a city in Keokuk County, Iowa, United States
- Kinross Charter Township, Michigan, a charter township in Chippewa County in the U.S. state of Michigan
  - Kinross, Michigan, an unincorporated community

== People ==
- Kinross (surname)

== Other ==
- Baron Kinross, a title in the Peerage of the United Kingdom
- Kinross Gold, a Canadian mining company
- Kinross (horse), British Thoroughbred racehorse

== See also ==
- Kinloss, Scotland, a village in Moray
- Kinloss (disambiguation)
