= 3rd Duke of Buckingham =

3rd Duke of Buckingham may refer to:

- Edward Stafford, 3rd Duke of Buckingham (1478–1521), English nobleman
- Richard Temple-Grenville, 3rd Duke of Buckingham and Chandos (1823–1889), British soldier
