= Edward Bruce, 1st Lord Kinloss =

Scottish lawyer and judge

Edward Bruce PC
- Lord Kinloss
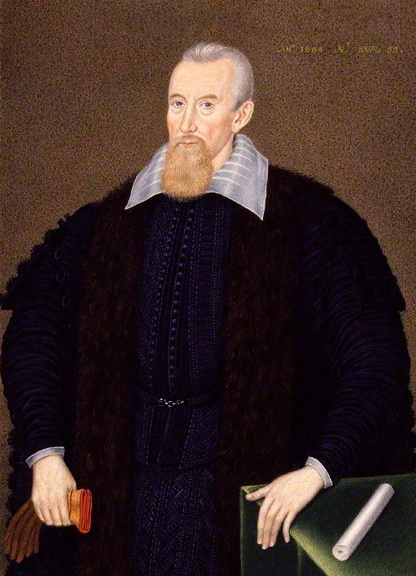

- Coat of arms
- Tenure: 1602–1611 (as Lord Kinloss); 1604–1611 (as Lord Bruce of Kinloss)
- Predecessor: New creation
- Successor: Edward Bruce, 2nd Lord Kinloss
- Other titles: Lord Bruce of Kinloss
- Born: 1548
- Died: 14 January 1611 (aged 62–63)
- Spouse: Magdalene Clark
- Issue: Edward Bruce, 2nd Lord Kinloss; Christian Bruce; Thomas Bruce, 1st Earl of Elgin; Robert Bruce, Baron of Skelton; Janet Bruce

Edward Bruce, 1st Lord Kinloss PC (1548 – 14 January 1611) was a Scottish lawyer and judge.

He was the second son of Edward Bruce of Blairhall and Alison Reid.

== Career ==
In 1594 James VI sent him as ambassador to London and gave him £1,000 Scots for his expenses. With James Colville, he was sent to invite Queen Elizabeth I to send a representative to the baptism of Prince Henry, discuss the matter of the Earl of Bothwell, Catholics in Scotland, and ask for the yearly sum of money that Elizabeth gave to James VI. They were to ensure the money was paid to Thomas Foulis. He also requested the rendition of Anne of Denmark's goldsmith Jacob Kroger who had fled to England with the queen's jewels.

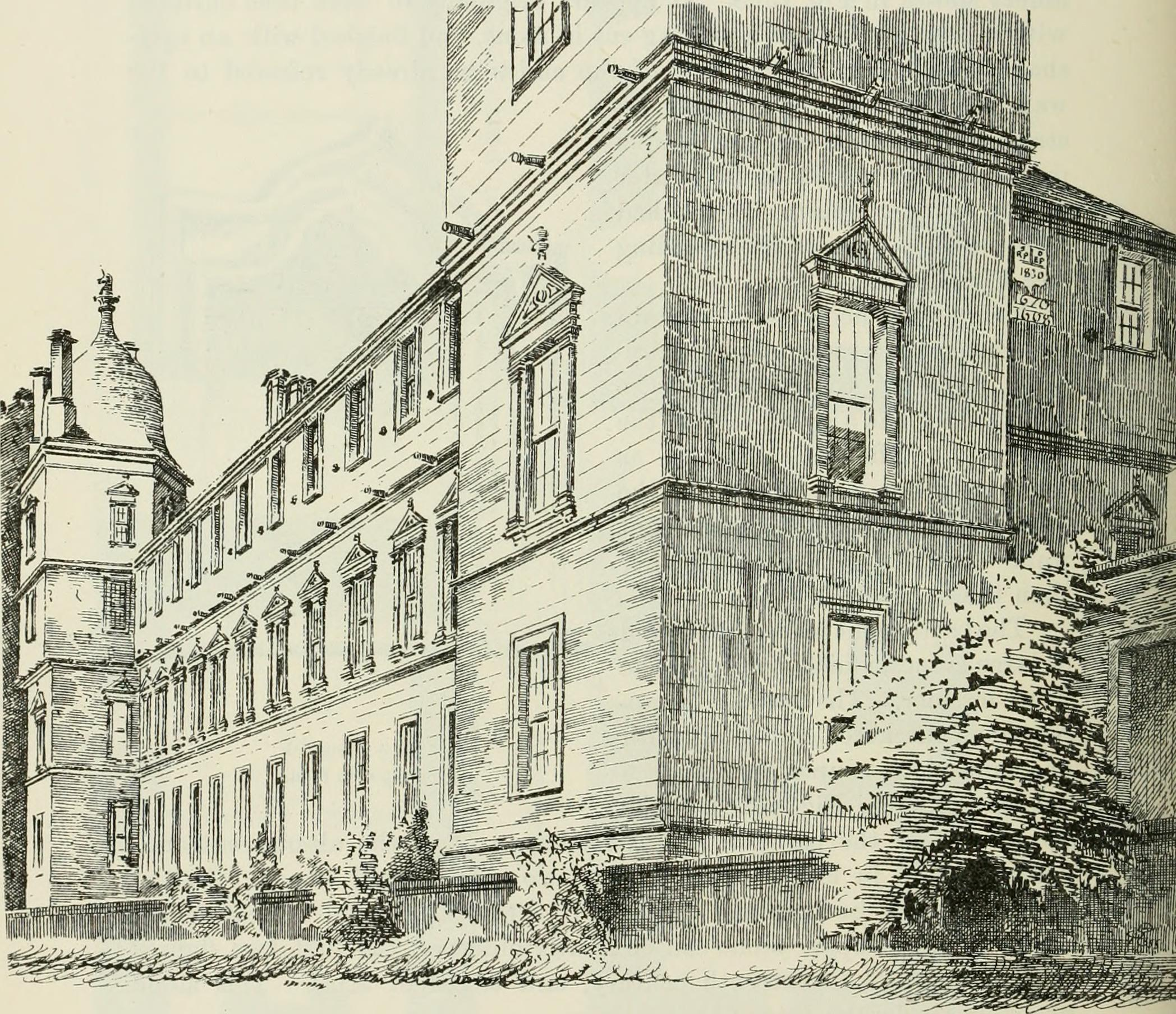
Lord Kinloss built Culross Abbey House in 1608.

Bruce was sent to London for money from Elizabeth again in April 1598 and received £3,000. He interceded in a legal case in London for his brother, George Bruce of Carnock, whose ship the Bruce had been forced to take on a group of African and Portuguese captives by English captains. He also successfully negotiated the release of Robert Ker of Cessford who was held by the Archbishop of York at Bishopthorpe. Bruce brought portraits of King James VI and Prince Henry to England.

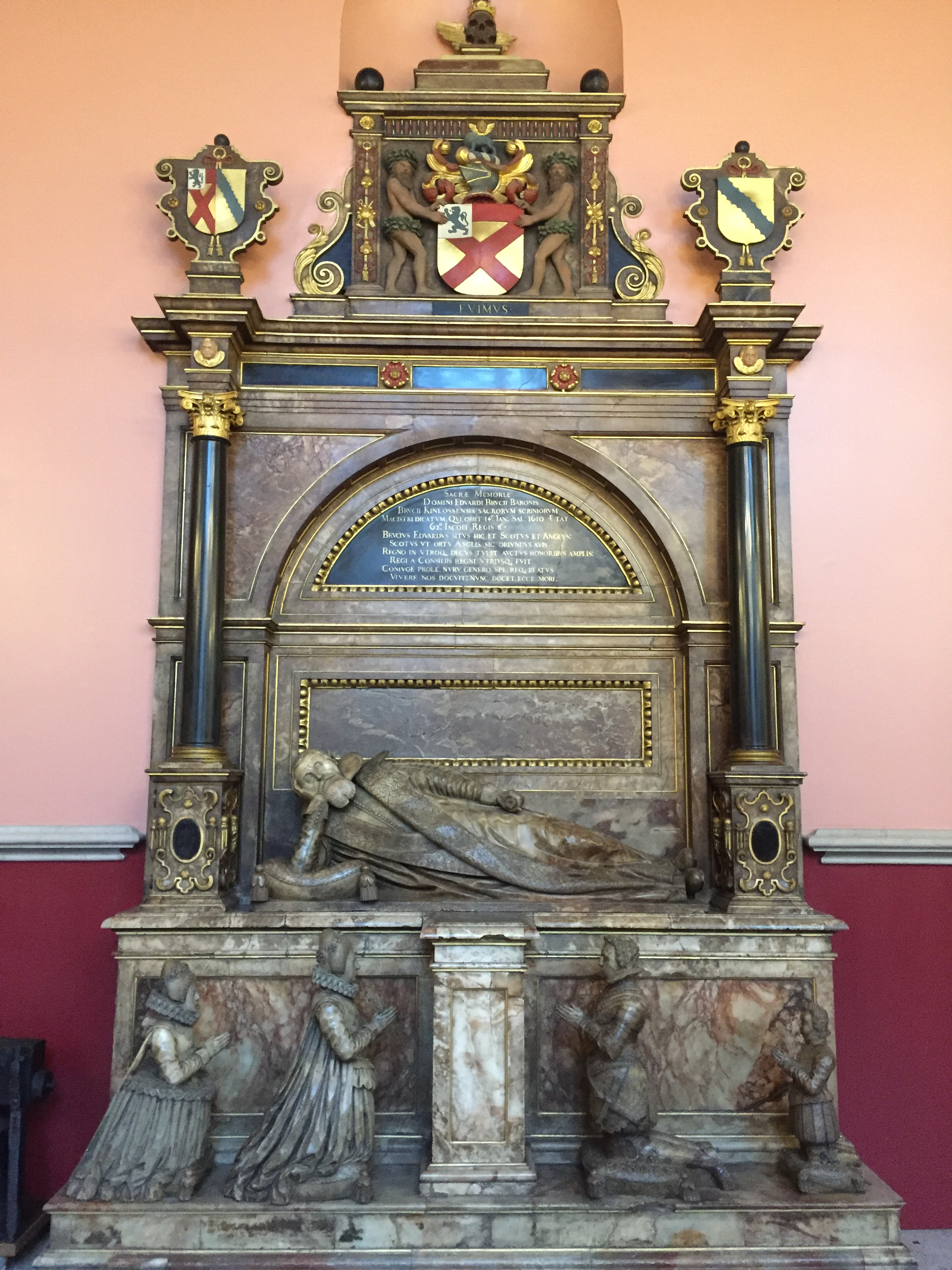
Kinloss's tomb at the then Rolls Chapel, now part of King's College London's Maughan Library.

On his return to Edinburgh, Bruce met with James VI in his cabinet at Holyrood Palace for four hours. Bruce's advice to the king on the Valentine Thomas affair led to rumours that he was corrupted by Elizabeth's gift of a gold chain.

He was made Commendator of the Abbey of Kinloss in 1601 and became Baron of Muirton. He served as a Lord of Session from 1597 to 1603 and was created Lord Kinloss in 1602, with remainder to his heirs and assigns whatsoever.

Bruce and the Earl of Mar went to London as ambassadors in April 1601, to understand the mood in London towards James's accession to the English throne after Essex's Rebellion. After the embassy, the sum paid as a subsidy to James VI was increased, by the persuasion of Sir Robert Cecil. Bruce was involved in the "Secret correspondence of James VI", an initiative to help put James on the throne of England.

=== England ===
Bruce arrived in London ahead of King James in April 1603 at the Union of the Crowns. In June the king sent him to greet Charles of Arenberg, who had arrived as the envoy from Isabella and Albert Rulers of the Netherlands to congratulate James, but had fallen ill from gout.

According to a French ambassador, the Marquis de Rosny, Bruce was a member of a conspicuous bedchamber faction at court which included the Earl of Mar and Sir Thomas Erskine. The Duke of Lennox and his followers formed a separate Scottish group and envied the influence of the bedchamber Scots. Rosny gave Bruce a diamond ring.

Bruce became an English subject, was admitted to the Privy Council, and appointed Master of the Rolls for life. He also received Whorlton Castle and its manor in 1603, which would remained in the Bruce family until the late 19th century.

In 1604, he was made Lord Bruce of Kinloss, with remainder to his heirs male. A letter from the Earl of Salisbury to the Earl of Shrewsbury written in 1608 alludes to Bruce having a grave illness.

He died in London in January 1611. He was succeeded in his titles by his eldest son, also named Edward.

An inventory was made of his household goods and silverware around the year 1610. He had seven pieces of tapestry for his great chamber, and a suite of gilt leather hangings for the gallery. His pictures included the king's arms, a portrait of Christian IV of Denmark, a Queen of Persia, a Queen of Turkey, Paris and Helen, a portrait of a nun, and a portrait of a French woman.

== Marriage and children ==
Edward Bruce married Magdalene Clerk, daughter of Alexander Clerk. Their children included:

1. Edward Bruce, 2nd Lord Kinloss (1594–1613), who was killed in duel with Edward Sackville at Bergen-op-Zoom and buried there, except his heart which was buried at Culross Abbey in a heart-shaped silver case clamped with iron between two stones. The heart burial was discovered in 1808 and reburied.
2. Christian Bruce (died 1675), who married William Cavendish, 2nd Earl of Devonshire.
3. Thomas Bruce, 1st Earl of Elgin (1599–1663)
4. Robert Bruce, Baron of Skelton
5. Janet Bruce (who may have been born illegitimately to another mother), who married Thomas Dalyell of the Binns, and was the mother of General Tam Dalyell of the Binns.

After his death, his widow married secondly Sir James Fullerton, MP and courtier, in 1616. William Gouge dedicated his book A Guide to Goe to God to her and Sir James.

Legal offices
Preceded by Sir Thomas Egerton	Master of the Rolls; 1603–1611	Succeeded by Sir Edward Phelips
Peerage of Scotland
New creation	Lord Kinloss; 1602–1611	Succeeded by Edward Bruce
New creation	Lord Bruce of Kinloss; 1604–1611	Succeeded by Edward Bruce
