= Rye St Antony School =

Headington Prep School Oxford

Location
- Franklin Road; Oxford, Oxfordshire, OX3 7SB; England; 51°45′35″N 1°13′33″W

Information
- Type: Private day and boarding school
- Motto: Be Ambitious. Be Curious. Be Yourself.
- Religious affiliation: Roman Catholic
- Established: 1930
- Founders: Elizabeth Rendall and Ivy King
- Closed: 2024
- Local authority: Oxfordshire
- Department for Education URN: 123295 Tables
- Headmistress: Caroline Jordan
- Gender: Girls (3–18) Boys (3–11)
- Age: 3 to 18
- Enrolment: 380~ (2011)
- Houses: 4
- Website: headingtonrye.org/prep

Rye St Antony School was an independent Roman Catholic boarding and day school for girls aged 3 to 18 years and boys aged 3 to 11 years in Headington, Oxford, England. The school's name was commonly abbreviated and referred to by both pupils and staff as 'Rye'. Rye was unique as a girls' independent Catholic school due to the fact that it was founded by two women rather than by a religious order.

In 2024, it merged with Headington School to become Headington Rye Oxford.

== History ==
The school was founded by Elizabeth Rendall and Ivy King in 1930 after a visit to the Church of St Anthony of Padua in Rye, East Sussex.

There were only seven headmistresses in Rye's history. In 1960, Miss Rendall died, and in 1963, the school became an educational trust with a Governing Body. Miss King continued as Headmistress until 1976 and spent her retirement in a house in the school grounds until her death in 1993. Miss King's younger sister, Gwen, joined the school in 1939 and faithfully served the school until her death in 2000 at the age of ninety-nine. Miss King's successor as Headmistress was Patsy Sumpter, who came to the school in 1959 and worked alongside Miss King in various posts before succeeding her as Headmistress from 1976 until 1990. Alison Jones was appointed as successor to Patsy Sumpter, and the fifth Headmistress, Sarah Ryan, succeeded Miss Jones on Miss Jones's retirement in 2018 and stayed for two years. Joanne Croft was then the head until 2023, when she was replaced by an interim head to support the school through the merger with Headington School.

View of Langley Lodge at Rye St Antony

The school was in central Oxford before moving to its later site of 12 acres (4.9 ha) in Headington in 1939. The school grounds included a Victorian house built by Alfred Waterhouse.

A performing arts centre was opened in February 2005. The school also opened a new Sports Centre (the Morton Sports Centre) in 2008 and renovated the Sixth Form Centre and Boarding house in 2010.

The school was rated "outstanding" in all aspects during its 2017 ISI inspection.

The school was criticised on social media for the wording of its 2020 exam results release in the midst of the controversial government algorithm used to determine grades, which was criticised by many for using the prior performance of a school to help determine results, causing pupils in low-income areas to achieve significantly less than similarly-performing students in more affluent areas. On 13 August 2020, the day the A-Level results came out, Joanne Croft, the headteacher, posted on Twitter; “#ResultsDay I’m so very proud of all our girls today for their #alevels2020 Ambitious and determined, no pandemic was going to stop them! #DreamBig #WorkHard #Success”. Her tweet caused substantial backlash on social media and was covered by the Financial Times, which commented that the algorithm led to the school "overturning its normally below-average performance with a stunning set of grades this year."

== Boarding ==
The two boarding houses were each in the charge of two housemistresses and their team of assistants. Girls had a choice of choosing full boarding, weekdays-only, or flexi-boarding.

- The Cottage for Years 11 and Sixth Form
- The Croft for Year 3 to Year 10

== Head Mistresses ==
- Elizabeth Rendall (joint founder) – (1930–60)
- Ivy King (joint founder) – (1930–76)
- Patsy Sumpter – (1976–90)
- Alison Jones – (1990–2018)
- Sarah Ryan – (2018–2020)
- Joanne Croft – (2020–2023)

== Former pupils ==
- Emilia Clarke (b. 1986) – actor
- Teresa Freeman-Grenville (b. 1957) – Scottish peer, 13th Lady Kinloss
- Elizabeth Jennings (b. 1926) – poet
- Annie Tempest (b. 1959) – artist, sculptor, and cartoonist
- Jude Tsang (b. 1992) – singer-songwriter, photographer, from Hong Kong
