= 1st (Hanover Square) Middlesex Artillery Volunteer Corps =

- Active: 1860–1876
- Country: United Kingdom
- Branch: Volunteer Force
- Type: Artillery Volunteer Corps
- Role: Field Artillery
- Size: Two Batteries
- Part of: 1st Administrative Brigade, Middlesex Artillery Volunteers
- Garrison/HQ: Hanover Square, Westminster; Leicester Square, Westminster

The 1st (Hanover Square) Middlesex Artillery Volunteer Corps (1st Middx AVC) was a unit of the Volunteer Force raised to supplement the British Army at a time of perceived crisis in 1860. The expense of maintaining a unit of this description led to its amalgamation into a better-funded corps in 1876.

== History ==
The 1st (Hanover Square) Middlesex Artillery Volunteer Corps was raised on 16 July 1860 during the great surge of enthusiasm after an invasion scare that saw the creation of many Rifle, Artillery and Engineer Volunteer units composed of part-time soldiers eager to supplement the Regular British Army in time of need. Apart from the Adjutant, Major W.B. Stevens, who had served 21 years in the East India Company's Madras Army, they were all enthusiastic amateurs. A second battery was formed on 22 September 1860

Initially, the unit was based in Regent Street, but by November 1860 its headquarters (HQ) was at No 3 Hanover Square in London's Mayfair district. In 1864, it took over commercial premises at No 28 Leicester Square, formerly the residence of Prince William Henry, Duke of Gloucester and Edinburgh and of his brother Prince Henry, Duke of Cumberland and Strathearn, and later of John Hunter the famous surgeon. Since then the square had become less socially exclusive. (The present No 28 dates from 1901.)

From 21 April 1864, the 1st Middlesex AVC formed part of the 1st Administrative Battalion, Middlesex Artillery Volunteers, which was also headquartered at 28 Leicester Square, and which shared its commanding officer and adjutant. The other unit in the Admin Battalion was the 1st Tower Hamlets AVC, also founded in 1860 and based at Poplar in East London.

As civilians, the Volunteers sometimes let politics intrude into unit affairs. In 1866, members of the 1st Middlesex Artillery Volunteers were accused of fundraising for Governor Edward Eyre of Jamaica, whose brutal suppression of the Morant Bay Rebellion in the island had divided political opinion in London.

At the great Easter Volunteer Review at Brighton Racecourse in 1862 (involving the sham 'Battle of White Hawk Down'), the 1st Middx AVC appeared with their field guns pulled by horses supplied for the occasion by Messrs Pickfords, the removal contractors. This initiative was welcomed by the Royal Commission on the Volunteer Force. In 1868, the 1st Middlesex also travelled to Portsmouth with horsed guns, for the great volunteer review there at Easter. They were also present at the Brighton Volunteer Review in 1871 - taking their horse drawn guns there by road.

But many Regular officers refused to believe that part-timers could be effective as field gunners, and despite the eloquent arguments of Lt-Col Shakespear of the 1st Middlesex Artillery Volunteers, the Secretary of State, Edward Cardwell, refused to allow the upkeep of guns, harness or horses to be paid from the Artillery Volunteers' government grant.

The cost of maintaining artillery units was high, and as a result many AVCs were wound up during the 1870s. The 1st Tower Hamlets disbanded in 1873, and in October that year the City of London Artillery joined the 1st Admin Battalion, its CO taking over as CO of the whole battalion. In May 1876, the 1st Middx AVC was forced to amalgamate its two batteries with the better-funded City of London Artillery.

== Commanding officers ==
- Lt-Col Henry Creed, half-pay captain in the East India Company's Bombay Horse Artillery, appointed 21 June 1864.
- Lt-Col John D. Shakespear, half-pay captain, Royal Artillery, appointed 25 March 1871.

== Honorary Colonel ==
The Honorary Colonel of the 1st Admin Bn was the Duke of Buckingham and Chandos, appointed in 1865. He carried on that role in the City of London Artillery after amalgamation

== Online sources ==
- British History Online
- Land Forces of Britain, the Empire and Commonwealth (Regiments.org)
