= Kinross (surname) =

Kinross is a surname of Scottish origin. Notable people with the surname include:

- Albert Kinross (1870–1929), English writer
- Cecil John Kinross (1896–1957), Canadian Victoria Cross recipient
- John Kinross (1855–1931), Scottish architect
- Nan Kinross (1926–2021), New Zealand nurse and nursing academic
- Patrick Balfour, 3rd Baron Kinross (1904–1976), writer and historian, biographer of Mustafa Kemal Atatürk
