= Mary Freeman-Grenville, 12th Lady Kinloss =

British peeress (1922–2012)

Mary Freeman-Grenville
- 12th Lady Kinloss
- Tenure: 17 October 1944 – 30 September 2012
- Born: 18 August 1922
- Died: 30 September 2012 (aged 90)
- Spouse: Greville Freeman (m. 1950)
- Issue: Bevil Freeman-Grenville, Master of Kinloss; Teresa Freeman-Grenville, 13th Lady Kinloss; Hon. Hester Haworth
- Parents: Luis Morgan-Grenville; Katherine Jackman

Beatrice Mary Grenville Freeman-Grenville, 12th Lady Kinloss (18 August 1922 – 30 September 2012) was a British peeress.

The eldest of the three daughters of Luis Chandos Francis Temple Morgan-Grenville and Katherine Beatrice MacKenzie Jackman, she was educated at Ravenscroft School, Eastbourne. She was the senior heir-general to Edward Seymour, Viscount Beauchamp, the only son of Lady Catherine Grey.

She succeeded to the title Lady Kinloss on the death in 1944 of her grandmother, Mary Morgan-Grenville, 11th Lady Kinloss. She married Dr Greville Stewart Parker Freeman (later Freeman-Grenville) in 1950; they had one son and two daughters:

- The Hon. Bevil David Stewart Chandos Freeman-Grenville, Master of Kinloss (1953–2012); presumably named for his ancestor Bevil Grenville
- Teresa Mary Nugent Freeman-Grenville, 13th Lady Kinloss (born 1957)
- The Hon. Hester Josephine Anne Freeman-Grenville (born 1960), married Peter Haworth in 1984 and has three sons.

She sat as an independent crossbencher peer in the House of Lords from the implementation of the Peerage Act 1963, which allowed women peers in their own right to sit in the House, until the implementation of the House of Lords Act 1999, which removed all but 92 hereditary peers. She served on the House of Lords Committee on European Communities from 1990 to 1992. She was unsuccessful in her bid to be elected as one of the retained 92 hereditary peers, coming 38th in a field of 79 candidates for 28 seats reserved for Crossbenchers.

The 12th Lady Kinloss died on 30 September 2012. She was succeeded by her daughter, Teresa Freeman-Grenville, 13th Lady Kinloss.

Peerage of Scotland
Preceded by Mary Morgan-Grenville	Lady Kinloss; 1944–2012	Succeeded by Teresa Freeman-Grenville
