= Lord Kinloss =

Title in the Peerage of Scotland

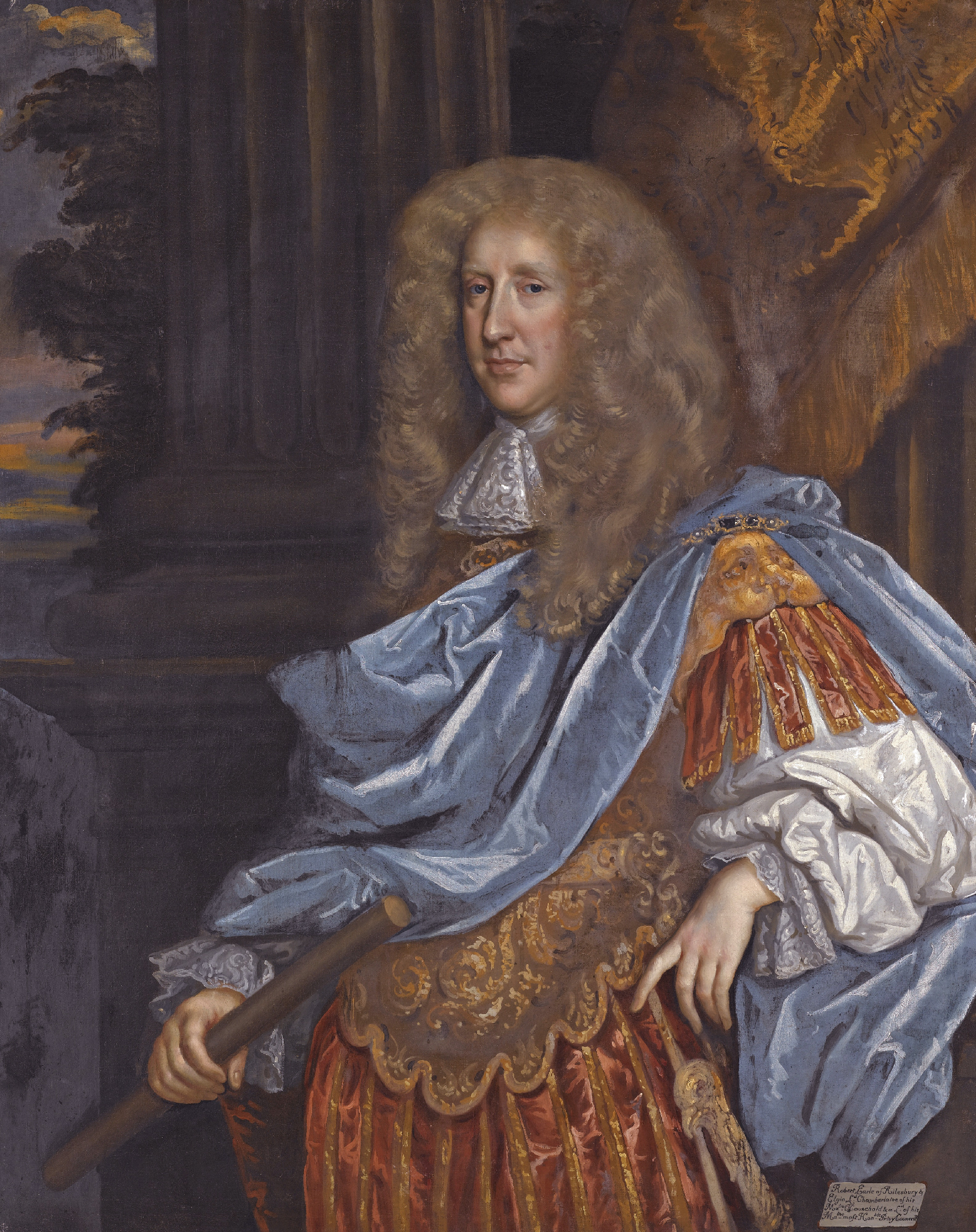
Robert Bruce, 1st Earl of Ailesbury, 2nd Earl of Elgin, 4th Lord Kinloss

Lord Kinloss is a title in the Peerage of Scotland. It was created in 1602 for Edward Bruce, later Master of the Rolls, with remainder to his heirs and assigns whatsoever. In 1604 he was also made Lord Bruce of Kinloss, with remainder to his heirs male, and in 1608 Lord Bruce of Kinloss, with remainder to any of his heirs. He was succeeded by his son, the second Lord, who was killed in a duel in 1613.

His younger brother, the third Lord, was created Earl of Elgin and Lord Bruce of Kinloss (a third separate barony) in 1633, with remainder to heirs male whatsoever, bearing the name and arms of Bruce. In 1641 he was also created Baron Bruce (designated "of Whorlton in the County of York") in the Peerage of England. He was succeeded by his son, the second Earl. He was created Baron Bruce of Skelton, Viscount Bruce and Earl of Ailesbury in the Peerage of England in 1664.

His grandson, the fourth Earl of Elgin, was the last male descendant of the first Lord Kinloss and had no male heirs of his own. He therefore chose as his heir his nephew the Hon. Thomas Brudenell, fourth son of George Brudenell, 3rd Earl of Cardigan. In 1746 he was given the additional title of Baron Bruce (designated "of Tottenham in the County of Wilts") with remainder to the Hon. Thomas. On his death in 1747 the earldom of Ailesbury, viscountcy of Bruce, Whorlton barony Bruce, and barony of Bruce of Skelton became extinct. The rest of his titles took three different lines of descent. He was succeeded in the three lordships of Bruce of Kinloss and the earldom of Elgin by his kinsman the ninth Earl of Kincardine (see Earl of Elgin and Earl of Kincardine for later history of these peerages). The Tottenham barony of Bruce passed according to the special remainder to his nephew Thomas, the second Baron. (The Earldom of Ailesbury was created anew for Thomas; see the Marquess of Ailesbury for later history of these titles).

The status of the lordship of Kinloss became uncertain. However, in 1868 the Committee for Privileges of the House of Lords decided that the rightful heir to the title was James Brydges, 3rd Duke of Chandos, as the son of Lady Mary Bruce, daughter of the fourth Earl of Elgin. However, he never assumed the title. On the death of the Duke, the dukedom became extinct.

The heir to the lordship of Kinloss was his only child, Anne, Duchess of Buckingham and Chandos and de jure eighth Lady Kinloss, the wife of Richard Temple-Grenville, 1st Duke of Buckingham and Chandos. In 1868 her grandson, Richard Temple-Grenville, 3rd Duke of Buckingham and Chandos, established his right to the lordship before the Committee for Privileges of the House of Lords, and became the tenth Lord Kinloss. On his death in 1889 the dukedom became extinct, while the lordship passed to his eldest daughter Mary. As of 2017 the title is held by the latter's great-granddaughter, the thirteenth Lady, who succeeded her mother in 2012.

The family seat is North View House, near Sheriff Hutton, North Yorkshire.

== Lords Kinloss (1602) ==
- Edward Bruce, 1st Lord Kinloss (1548–1611)
- Edward Bruce, 2nd Lord Kinloss (1594–1613)
- Thomas Bruce, 1st Earl of Elgin, 3rd Lord Kinloss (1599–1663)
- Robert Bruce, 2nd Earl of Elgin, 1st Earl of Ailesbury, 4th Lord Kinloss (1627–1685)
- Thomas Bruce, 3rd Earl of Elgin, 2nd Earl of Ailesbury, 5th Lord Kinloss (1656–1741)
- Charles Bruce, 4th Earl of Elgin, 6th Lord Kinloss (1682–1747)
- James Brydges, 3rd Duke of Chandos, de jure 7th Lord Kinloss (1731–1789)
- Anne Elizabeth Temple-Nugent-Brydges-Chandos-Grenville, de jure 8th Lady Kinloss (1779–1836)
- Richard Plantagenet Temple-Nugent-Brydges-Chandos-Grenville, 2nd Duke of Buckingham and Chandos, de jure 9th Lord Kinloss (1797–1861)
- Richard Plantagenet Campbell Temple-Nugent-Brydges-Chandos-Grenville, 3rd Duke of Buckingham and Chandos, 10th Lord Kinloss (1823–1889)
- Mary Morgan-Grenville, 11th Lady Kinloss (1852–1944)
- (Beatrice) Mary Grenville Freeman-Grenville, 12th Lady Kinloss (1922–2012)
- Teresa Mary Nugent Freeman-Grenville, 13th Lady Kinloss (b. 1957)

The heir presumptive is the present holder's sister, the Hon. Hester Josephine Anne Freeman-Grenville, Mistress of Kinloss (b. 1960)

The heir presumptive's heir apparent is her son Joseph Anthony Haworth (b. 1985)

Earls and Marquesses of Ailesbury, Earls of Cardigan, Earls of Elgin, and Earls of Kincardine family tree

Edward Bruce of Blairhall c. 1505–1565
Lord Kinloss, 1602 Lord Bruce of Kinloss, 1604; Lord Bruce of Kinloss, 1608
Edward Bruce; 1548–1611; 1st Lord Kinloss, Lord Bruce of Kinloss (1604), and Lord Bruce of Kinloss (1608)	George Bruce of Carnock c. 1550–1625	Margaret Primrose
Earl of Elgin, Lord Bruce of Kinloss, and Baron Bruce of Whorlton in the County of York, 1633
Edward Bruce; 1594–1613; 2nd Lord Kinloss, Lord Bruce of Kinloss (1604), and Lord Bruce of Kinloss (1608)	Thomas Bruce; 1599–1663; 1st Earl of Elgin, Lord Bruce of Kinloss (1633), and Baron Bruce of Whorlton, 3rd Lord Kinloss, Lord Bruce of Kinloss (1604), and Lord Bruce of Kinloss (1608)	Mary Preston	George Bruce (2nd) of Carnock d. 1643	Robert Bruce of Broomhall d. 1652
Earl of Ailesbury (1st creation), Viscount Bruce, and Baron Bruce of Skelton, 1664	Baron Brudenell of Stonton in the County of Leicester, 1628 Earl of Cardigan, 1661	Earl of Kincardine and Lord Bruce of Torry, 1647	See also: Dukes of Montrose family tree for the Earl of Kincardine 1644 creation
Robert Bruce; 1627–1685; 2nd Earl of Elgin, Lord Bruce of Kinloss (1633), and Baron Bruce of Whorlton, 1st Earl of Ailesbury, Viscount Bruce, and Baron Bruce of Skelton, 4th Lord Kinloss, Lord Bruce of Kinloss (1604), and Lord Bruce of Kinloss (1608)	Thomas Brudenell c. 1583–1663; 1st Earl of Cardigan and Baron Brudenell of Stonton	Edward Bruce d. 1662; 1st Earl of Kincardine and Lord Bruce of Torry	Alexander Bruce c. 1629–1680; 2nd Earl of Kincardine and Lord Bruce of Torry	Alexander Bruce d. 1706; 4th Earl of Kincardine and Lord Bruce of Torry
Thomas Bruce; 1656–1741; 3rd Earl of Elgin, Lord Bruce of Kinloss (1633), and Baron Bruce of Whorlton, 2nd Earl of Ailesbury, Viscount Bruce, and Baron Bruce of Skelton, 5th Lord Kinloss, Lord Bruce of Kinloss (1604), and Lord Bruce of Kinloss (1608)	Robert Brudenell; 1607–1703; 2nd Earl of Cardigan and Baron Brudenell of Stonton	Alexander Bruce c. 1666–1705; 3rd Earl of Kincardine and Lord Bruce of Torry	Robert Bruce d. 1718; 5th Earl of Kincardine and Lord Bruce of Torry	Alexander Bruce; 1662–1721; 6th Earl of Kincardine and Lord Bruce of Torry	Thomas Bruce; 1663–1739/1740; 7th Earl of Kincardine and Lord Bruce of Torry
Baron Bruce of Tottenham in the County of Wilts, 1746
Charles Bruce; 1682–1747; 4th Earl of Elgin, Lord Bruce of Kinloss (1633), and Baron Bruce of Whorlton, 3rd Earl of Ailesbury, Viscount Bruce, and Baron Bruce of Skelton, 6th Lord Kinloss, Lord Bruce of Kinloss (1604), and Lord Bruce of Kinloss (1608), 1st Baron Bruce of Tottenham	George Brudenell; 1685–1732; 3rd Earl of Cardigan and Baron Brudenell of Stonton	Elizabeth Brudenell; 1689–1745	William Bruce; 1710–1740; 8th Earl of Kincardine and Lord Bruce of Torry
Earldom of Ailesbury, Viscountcy of Bruce, Whorlton Barony Bruce, Barony of Bruce of Skelton, and Lordship of Kinloss extinct, 1747
Earl of Ailesbury Buckinghamshire, Great Britain (2nd creation), 1747
George Brudenell, later Montagu 1712–1790; Duke of Montagu, Marquess of Monthermer, 4th Earl of Cardigan and Baron Brudenell of Stonton	James Brudenell; 1725–1811; 5th Earl of Cardigan and Baron Brudenell of Stonton	Robert Brudenell; 1726–1768	Thomas Brudenell-Bruce; 1729–1814; 1st Earl of Ailesbury, 2nd Baron Bruce of Tottenham	Charles Bruce; 1732–1771; 5th Earl of Elgin, Lord Bruce of Kinloss (1633) and Lord Bruce of Kinloss, 9th Earl of Kincardine and Lord Bruce of Torry, Lord Bruce of Kinloss (1604), Lord Bruce of Kinloss (1608)
Marquess of Ailesbury, Earl Bruce of Whorlton, County of York, and Viscount Savernake of Savernake Forest, Wiltshire, 1821
Robert Brudenell; 1760–1837; 6th Earl of Cardigan and Baron Brudenell of Stonton	Charles Brudenell-Bruce; 1773–1856; 1st Marquess of Ailesbury, Earl Bruce, and Viscount Savernake, 2nd Earl of Ailesbury, 3rd Baron Bruce of Tottenham	William Robert Bruce; 1764–1771; 6th Earl of Elgin and Lord Bruce of Kinloss (1633), 10th Earl of Kincardine and Lord Bruce of Torry	Thomas Bruce; 1766–1841; 7th Earl of Elgin and Lord Bruce of Kinloss (1633), 11th Earl of Kincardine and Lord Bruce of Torry
Baron Elgin of Elgin, 1849
James Brudenell🐴 1797–1868; 7th Earl of Cardigan and Baron Brudenell of Stonton	George Brudenell-Bruce; 1804–1878; 2nd Marquess of Ailesbury, Earl Bruce, Viscount Savernake, 8th Earl of Cardigan and Baron Brudenell of Stonton, 3rd Earl of Ailesbury, 4th Baron Bruce of Tottenham	Ernest Brudenell-Bruce; 1811–1886; 3rd Marquess of Ailesbury, Earl Bruce, Viscount Savernake, 9th Earl of Cardigan and Baron Brudenell of Stonton, 4th Earl of Ailesbury, 5th Baron Bruce of Tottenham	James Bruce; 1811–1863; 8th Earl of Elgin and Lord Bruce of Kinloss (1633), 12th Earl of Kincardine (1647) and Lord Bruce of Torry, 1st Baron Elgin
George John Brudenell-Bruce; 1839–1868	Henry Brudenell-Bruce; 1842–1911; 5th Marquess of Ailesbury, Earl Bruce of Whorlton, and Viscount Savernake, 11th Earl of Cardigan and Baron Brudenell of Stonton, 6th Earl of Ailesbury, 7th Baron Bruce of Tottenham	Victor Alexander Bruce; 1849–1917; 9th Earl of Elgin and Lord Bruce of Kinloss (1633), 13th Earl of Kincardine (1647) and Lord Bruce of Torry, 2nd Baron Elgin
George William Thomas Brudenell-Bruce; 1863–1894; 4th Marquess of Ailesbury, Earl Bruce of Whorlton, and Viscount Savernake, 10th Earl of Cardigan and Baron Brudenell of Stonton, 5th Earl of Ailesbury, 6th Baron Bruce of Tottenham	George William James Chandos Brudenell-Bruce; 1873–1961; 6th Marquess of Ailesbury, Earl Bruce of Whorlton, and Viscount Savernake, 12th Earl of Cardigan and Baron Brudenell of Stonton, 7th Earl of Ailesbury, 8th Baron Bruce of Tottenham	Edward James Bruce; 1881–1968; 10th Earl of Elgin and Lord Bruce of Kinloss (1633), 14th Earl of Kincardine (1647) and Lord Bruce of Torry, 3rd Baron Elgin
Chandos Sydney Cedric Brudenell-Bruce; 1904–1974; 7th Marquess of Ailesbury, Earl Bruce of Whorlton, and Viscount Savernake, 13th Earl of Cardigan and Baron Brudenell of Stonton, 8th Earl of Ailesbury, 9th Baron Bruce of Tottenham
Michael Sydney Cedric Brudenell-Bruce; 1926–2024; 8th Marquess of Ailesbury, Earl Bruce of Whorlton, and Viscount Savernake, 14th Earl of Cardigan and Baron Brudenell of Stonton, 9th Earl of Ailesbury, 10th Baron Bruce of Tottenham	Andrew Douglas Alexander Thomas Bruce b. 1924; 11th Earl of Elgin and Lord Bruce of Kinloss (1633), 15th Earl of Kincardine (1647) and Lord Bruce of Torry, 4th Baron Elgin
David Michael James Brudenell-Bruce b. 1952; 9th Marquess of Ailesbury, Earl Bruce of Whorlton, and Viscount Savernake, 15th Earl of Cardigan and Baron Brudenell of Stonton, 10th Earl of Ailesbury, 11th Baron Bruce of Tottenham	Charles Edward Bruce b. 1961 styled Lord Bruce
Heir apparent to the Earldom of Elgin and the Earldom of Kincardine
Thomas James Brudenell-Bruce b. 1982 styled Earl of Cardigan
Heir apparent to the Marquessate of Ailesbury and Earldom of Cardigan

== See also ==
- Earl of Elgin
- Earl of Kincardine
- Marquess of Ailesbury
- Duke of Chandos
- Duke of Buckingham and Chandos
