= Mary Morgan-Grenville, 11th Lady Kinloss =

Hereditary suo jure peeress

The Right Honourable The Lady Kinloss CI
- Born: 30 September 1852
- Died: 17 October 1944 (aged 92)
- Spouse: Luis Courthorpe Morgan
- Children: 6

Mary Elizabeth Morgan-Grenville, 11th Lady Kinloss CI (née Lady Mary Temple-Nugent-Brydges-Chandos-Grenville; 30 September 1852 – 17 October 1944) was a British peeress.

== Early life ==
Mary was the eldest of the three daughters of Richard Temple-Nugent-Brydges-Chandos-Grenville, 3rd Duke of Buckingham and Chandos, and Caroline, Duchess of Buckingham and Chandos (née Harvey).

== Inheritance ==
Upon the death of her father on 26 March 1889, she succeeded to the Lordship of Kinloss, one of her father's subsidiary titles. (As he had no sons, his title as Duke of Buckingham and Chandos became extinct on his death, but titles in the Peerage of Scotland can pass to females).

Due to her father's role of Governor of Madras (1875-1880), she was made a Companion of the Order of the Crown of India in 1878. She had acted as the Duke's host in Madras alongside her other two sisters, her father being a widower. In addition to her role as the Duke's hostess, she was also Churchwarden of Stowe Parish church. This was a role that was also occupied by Major Thomas Close-Smith at the same time, her son in law. Her eldest daughter the Hon. Mary Close-Smith became Churchwarden after her mother's death.

== Personal life ==
On 4 November 1884 she married Major Luis Courthorpe Morgan. Together, they were the parents of:

- The Hon. Caroline Mary Elizabeth Morgan-Grenville, JP (1886–1972), who married Maj. Thomas Close-Smith (died 1946), of Boycott Manor, in 1909; he served as High Sheriff of Buckinghamshire in 1942.
- Capt. The Hon. Richard George Grenville Morgan-Grenville, Master of Kinloss (1887–1914), who died at Ploegsteert Wood.
- The Hon. Luis Chandos Francis Temple Morgan-Grenville, Master of Kinloss (1889–1944), who married Katherine Beatrice MacKenzie Jackman. They are the parents of Mary Freeman-Grenville, 12th Lady Kinloss.
- Lt.-Col. The Hon. Thomas George Breadalbane Morgan-Grenville (1891–1965)
- The Hon. Robert William Morgan-Grenville (1892–1988)
- Capt. The Hon. Harry Nugent Morgan-Grenville (1896–1979)

After selling Stowe House in 1921, partly due to the loss of her eldest son and heir in the Great War and Stowe's high-running costs and debts, Lady Kinloss moved to Moreton Lodge, Maids Moreton. Her eldest daughter, the Hon. Caroline Mary Elizabeth Close-Smith, continued to live at Stowe, except at her husband Thomas's seat, Boycott Manor. Their descendants continue to live in the parish.

She was succeeded to the title Lady Kinloss by her 22-year-old granddaughter Mary Freeman-Grenville, 12th Lady Kinloss.

== See also ==
- Duke of Chandos
- Duke of Buckingham and Chandos

Peerage of Scotland
Preceded by Richard Temple-Grenville	Lady Kinloss; 1889–1944	Succeeded by Mary Freeman-Grenville
