= Richard Temple-Nugent-Brydges-Chandos-Grenville, 3rd Duke of Buckingham and Chandos =

British politician (1823–1889)

His Grace The Duke of Buckingham and Chandos GCSI PC DL
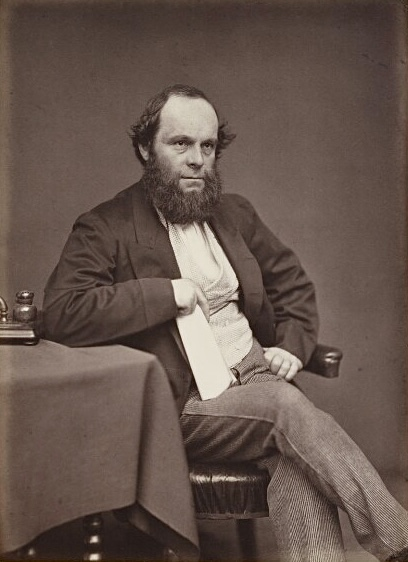
- Portrait by William Walker, c. 1867

Governor of Madras Presidency
- In office 23 November 1875 – 20 December 1880
- Governors-General: The Earl of Northbrook; The Earl of Lytton; The Marquess of Ripon
- Preceded by: William Rose Robinson
- Succeeded by: William Patrick Adam

Secretary of State for the Colonies
- In office 8 March 1867 – 1 December 1868
- Monarch: Victoria
- Prime Minister: The Earl of Derby; Benjamin Disraeli
- Preceded by: The Earl of Carnarvon
- Succeeded by: The Earl Granville

Lord President of the Council
- In office 6 July 1866 – 8 March 1867
- Monarch: Victoria
- Prime Minister: The Earl of Derby
- Preceded by: The Earl Granville
- Succeeded by: The Duke of Marlborough

Personal details
- Born: Richard Plantagenet Campbell Temple-Nugent-Brydges-Chandos-Grenville; 10 September 1823 Westminster St James, Middlesex, England
- Died: 26 March 1889 (aged 65) Chandos House, Marylebone, London, England
- Party: Conservative
- Spouses: Caroline Harvey (m. 1851; died 1874) Alice Graham-Montgomery (m. 1885)
- Children: 3, including Mary Morgan-Grenville, 11th Lady Kinloss
- Parents: Richard Temple-Nugent-Brydges-Chandos-Grenville, 2nd Duke of Buckingham and Chandos (father); Lady Mary Campbell (mother)
- Education: Christ Church, Oxford

Richard Plantagenet Campbell Temple-Nugent-Brydges-Chandos-Grenville, 3rd Duke of Buckingham and Chandos, GCSI, PC, DL (10 September 1823 – 26 March 1889), styled Earl Temple until 1839 and Marquess of Chandos from 1839 to 1861, was a British soldier, politician and administrator of the 19th century. He was a close friend and subordinate of Benjamin Disraeli and served as the secretary of state for the colonies from 1867 to 1868 and governor of Madras from 1875 to 1880.

Buckingham was the only son of Richard Temple-Grenville, 2nd Duke of Buckingham and Chandos, and was educated at Eton and Christ Church, Oxford. He joined the British Army, eventually rising to become a colonel. Buckingham entered politics, as Lord Chandos, in 1846 when he was elected unopposed from Buckinghamshire as a candidate of the Conservative Party. Buckingham served as a member of Parliament from 1846 to 1857, when he resigned. He contested a re-election in 1859, but lost. Buckingham served in various political offices during his tenure.

In March 1867, he was appointed Secretary of State for the Colonies and served until December 1868. He also served as governor of Madras from 1875 to 1880. As governor, he handled the relief measures for the victims of the Great Famine of 1876–1878. Buckingham also served as Lord of the Treasury, Keeper of the Privy Seal of the Prince of Wales, Deputy Warden of the Stannaries, Deputy Lieutenant of Buckinghamshire, Chairman of the London and North-Western Railway, member of the Imperial Privy Council, Lord President of the Council and chairman of the committees in the House of Lords. He died in 1889 at the age of 65.

== Background and education ==
Buckingham was the second child and only son of Richard, 2nd Duke of Buckingham and Chandos, and his wife Lady Mary, younger daughter of John Campbell, 4th Earl of Breadalbane and Holland (later the 1st Marquess of Breadalbane). His sister, Lady Anna Eliza Mary Gore-Langton, was a women's rights campaigner. As his father's son and heir apparent, he was styled Earl Temple from birth. He was 15 years of age when his paternal grandfather died and his father became the 2nd Duke of Buckingham and Chandos. From this time, he was styled Marquess of Chandos until he succeeded his father as Duke.

Upon his father's death in 1861, his titles were Duke of Buckingham and Chandos, Marquess of Chandos, and Earl Temple of Stowe in the Peerage of the United Kingdom; Marquess of Buckingham, Earl Temple, Viscount and Baron Cobham in the Peerage of Great Britain; and Earl Nugent in the Peerage of Ireland. In 1868, he was also recognised by the House of Lords as Lord Kinloss in the Peerage of Scotland. He inherited 10,500 acres, mostly in Buckingham.

The young Lord Temple, later Lord Chandos, attended Eton until 1841 and graduated from Christ Church, Oxford, from which he later received an honorary degree of D.C.L. Two years after graduation, Lord Chandos (as he then was) was commissioned a Lieutenant in the Royal Buckinghamshire Yeomanry and he would eventually become Honorary Colonel of that regiment. He was also Hon. Colonel of the 1st Administrative Battalion, Middlesex Artillery Volunteers and later of the City of London Artillery.

== Early career ==
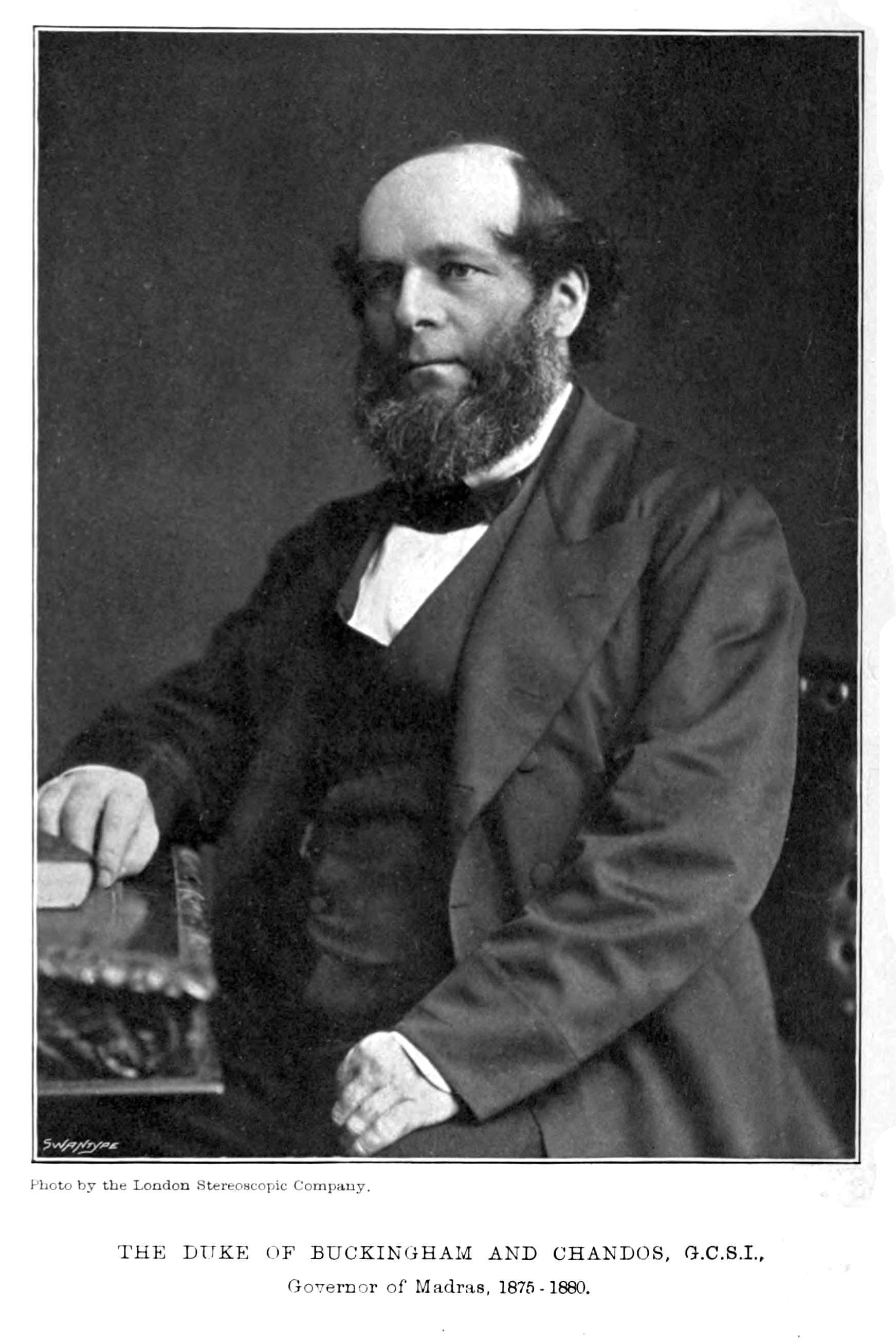

In 1846, Buckingham, as the Marquess of Chandos, entered Parliament as Conservative MP for Buckinghamshire, and remained as an unopposed MP until 1857. The young Lord Chandos was appointed a deputy lieutenant for Oxfordshire on 3 February 1846, Hampshire on 17 February, and Northamptonshire on 29 May.

In 1852, he entered Lord Derby's administration as a Lord of the Treasury, a position he held for exactly ten months. That year, he was also appointed Keeper of the Privy Seal of the Prince of Wales, Deputy Warden of the Stannaries, deputy lieutenant of Buckinghamshire, and chairman of the London and North-Western Railway. In 1857, he resigned as MP for Buckinghamshire and did not stand for re-election. In 1861, he succeeded his father as Duke of Buckingham and Chandos (and in various other titles across four Peerages) and took his seat in the House of Lords. In the 1860s he was chairman of the London Pneumatic Despatch Company.

Buckingham's political career was stagnant until 1866, when he was appointed to the Privy Council and became Lord Derby's Lord President of the Council. He served as Lord President of the Council until 8 March 1867, when he succeeded Lord Carnarvon as Secretary of State for the Colonies.

== As Secretary of State for the Colonies ==
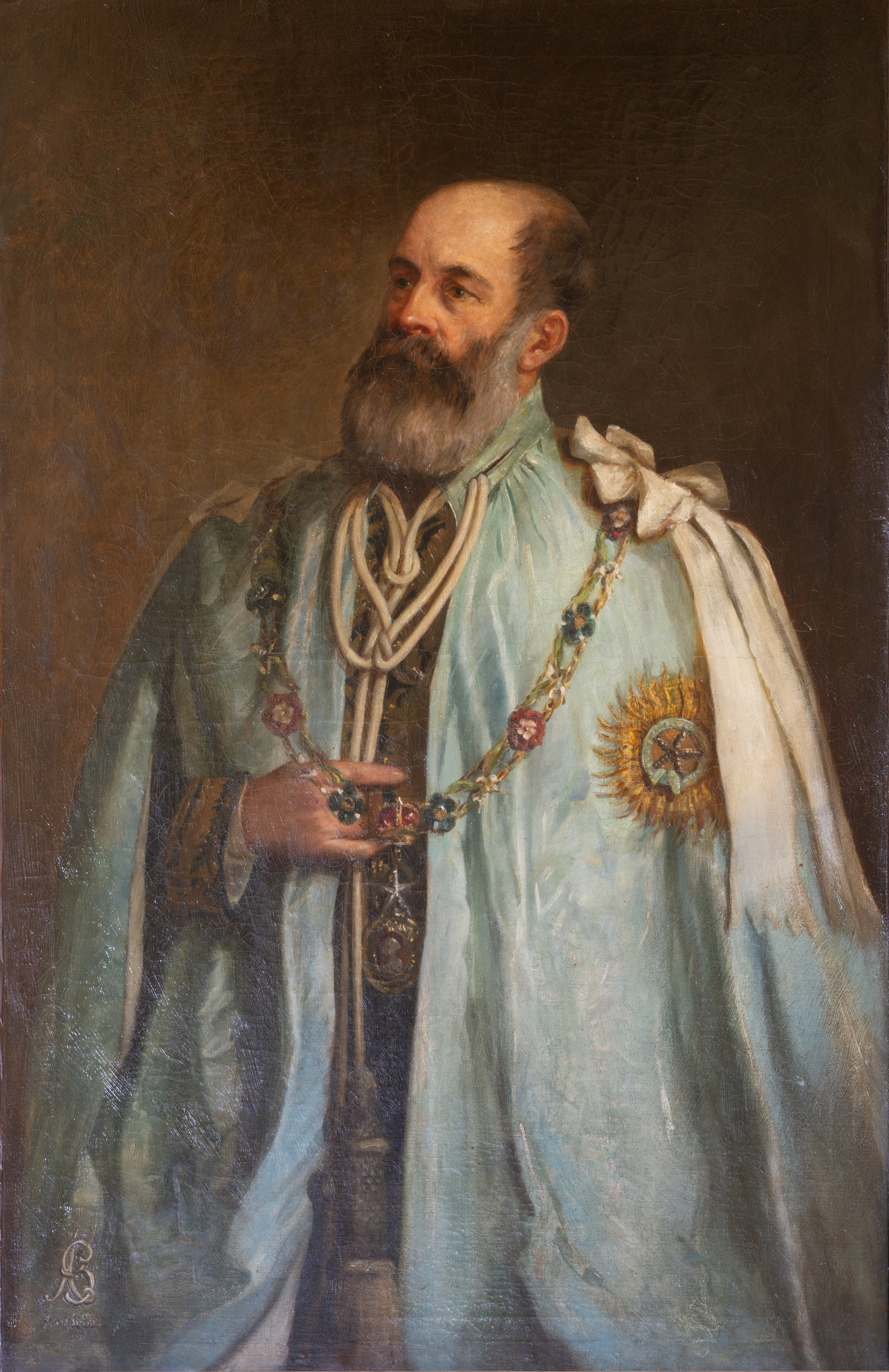
The Duke of Buckingham and Chandos GSCI in the mantle of a Knight Grand Commander of the Order of the Star of India

Buckingham was appointed Secretary of State for the Colonies when Lord Carnarvon resigned in March 1867 over the Reform Bill and served from 8 March 1867 to 1 December 1868. During this period, he was also appointed Lord Lieutenant of Buckinghamshire. As Secretary of State for the Colonies. Buckingham had to deal with the British North America Act. He also attracted controversy over his dispute with Bishop Colenso of Natal. Buckingham's tenure ended in December 1868 when the Conservative Party ministry of Benjamin Disraeli resigned. He was succeeded as Colonial Secretary by Lord Granville.

On 21 July 1868, the House of Lords recognised him as the 10th Lord Kinloss in the Peerage of Scotland, which had been dormant since the death of the 6th Lord Kinloss, his three-times great-grandfather Charles Bruce, 4th Earl of Elgin, in 1747. Through the House of Lords ruling, Buckingham's father was recognised posthumously as de jure 9th Lord Kinloss, his maternal grandmother Lady Anna Brydges as de jure 8th Lady Kinloss, and his great-grandfather James Brydges, 3rd Duke of Chandos as de jure 7th Lord Kinloss. Though the lordship was the most minor of Buckingham's many titles, it was the only one that could be inherited by his daughters, and he established his right to it at a time when the likelihood emerged that he would leave no male heir.

== Governor of Madras ==
Map of Chennai City showing the Buckingham Canal. The Canal connects the Coovum and Adayar rivers.

When the Conservative Party was re-elected to power in the United Kingdom in 1874 and Disraeli became the Prime Minister once again, Buckingham was appointed Governor of the Madras Presidency, British India. Buckingham moved to Madras and took his seat on 23 November 1875.

On 28 June 1876, he was appointed an Extra Knight Grand Commander of the Most Exalted Order of the Star of India.

Buckingham served as the governor of Madras from 1875 to 1880. His tenure was plagued by deteriorating socio-economic and health conditions. In 1876, the Great Famine of 1876–78 broke out in Madras Presidency. By August 1877, the famine had spread all over the Presidency and over 18 million people were affected. To make matters worse, the rains failed in parts of Madras and Mysore. Large quantities of grain were shipped from Bengal to Madras port, and through his efforts, famine relief was distributed to 839,000 people in the Madras districts, besides 160,000 in the Bombay Districts and 151,000 in the Mysore districts.

The Governor appealed to the principal cities of England, Scotland, Ireland and India for assistance. At Buckingham's suggestion, the Lord Mayor of London collected relief funds of up to £475,000 in 1877 (£47.9 million as of 2025). Though the famine eventually came to an end in 1878, the issue had far-reaching effects.

As a part of the famine relief work, Buckingham had commenced the construction of a navigation channel between Madras city and the northern part of the Madras Presidency so that transportation of supplies to the interior in cases of emergency would be easy. More than 715,000 people were employed as labourers in Madras to assist with the relief work. Opened in 1878, this canal was named after Buckingham as the Buckingham Canal. Buckingham Street in Penang, Malaysia was also named after him by the Tamil labourers who were brought there during the British colonial period.

Displeasure of the tribes of the northern part of the Presidency over the stringent taxation schemes of the British government erupted in the form of a major rebellion in 1879. The rebellion was eventually suppressed through a joint operation of the Madras police and army and the Hyderabad army, and the captured prisoners were sent to the Andamans. Many of the stringent taxation laws were repealed.

On 30 August 1880, William Patrick Adam was appointed Governor of Madras and he succeeded Buckingham in December 1880.

Detail from the painting of the Maharaja of Travancore Welcoming Buckingham and Chandos, Trivandrum 1880, painted by Raja Ravi Varma.

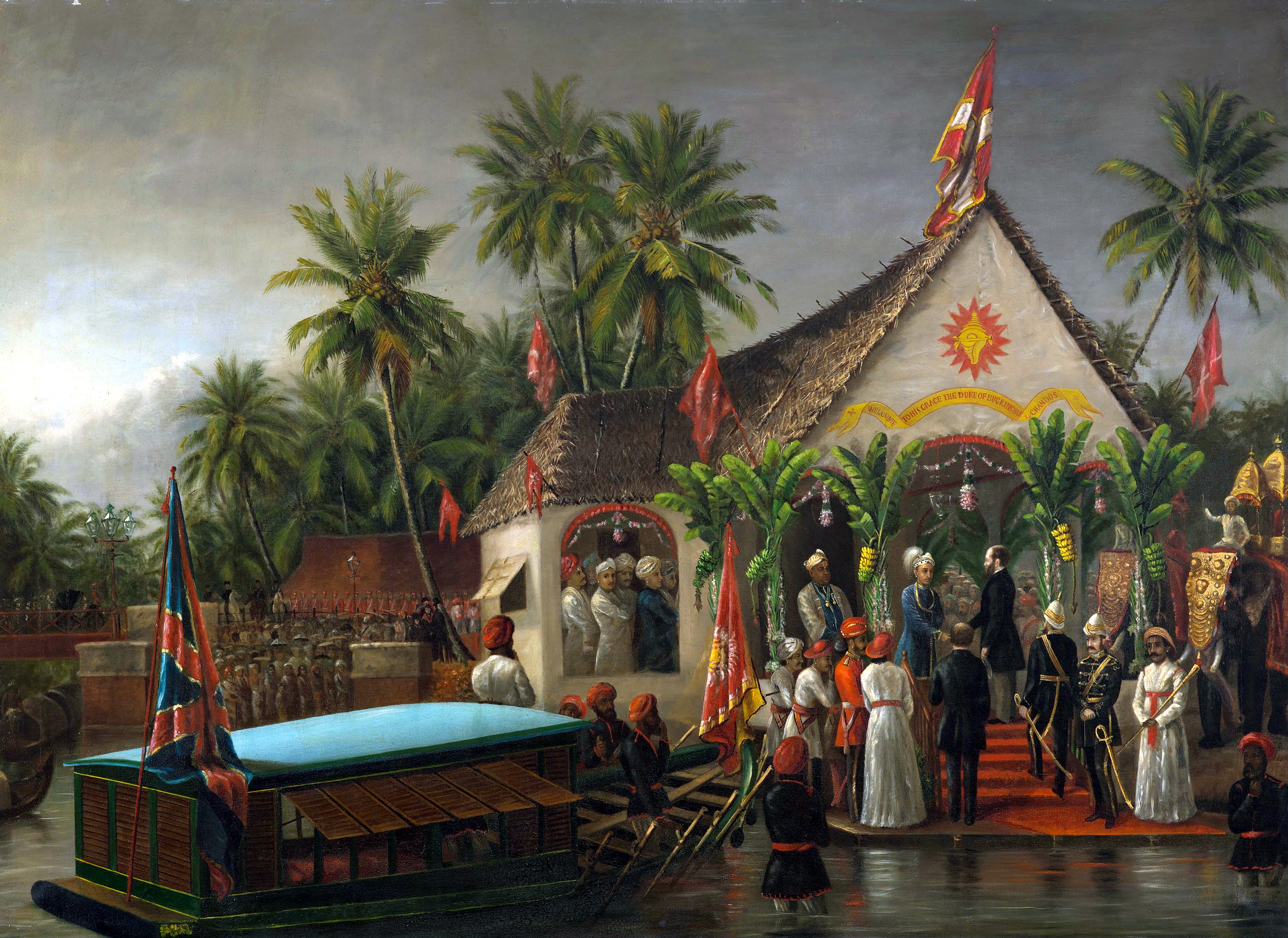
Painting by Raja Ravi Varma depicting Buckingham being greeted by Visakham Thirunal, with Ayilyam Thirunal of Travancore looking on, during Buckingham's visit to Trivandrum, Travancore in early 1880.

Detail from the painting of the Maharaja of Travancore and His Brother Welcoming Buckingham and Chandos to Trivandrum in 1880, painted by Raja Ravi Varma, 1881.

== Later life and death ==
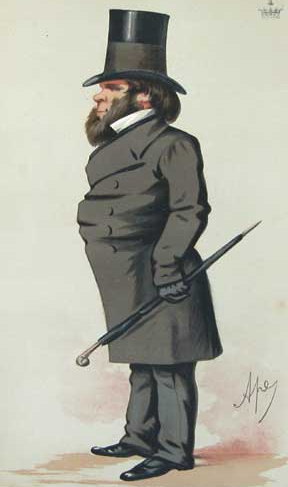
The Duke of Buckingham and Chandos, by Carlo Pellegrini, 1875.

In May 1886, Buckingham succeeded Lord Redesdale as Chairman of Committees in the House of Lords. He made few speeches in the House of Lords and succeeded in paying off most of his father's debts. Gradually, towards the later part of his life, his financial situation improved. By 1883, he owned 10,482 acres (4,242 ha) of land with a total value of £18,080.

Buckingham died in March 1889, aged 65, from diabetes at Chandos House, London. His illness was unexpected and not originally thought to be serious; the House of Lords postponed voting on several bills until he recovered. Within a week, however, his illness proved fatal, despite the efforts of Dr. Henry Walter Kiallmark, the family physician, and Sir James Paget, who was called in to assist.

The duke was buried at the family vault in the church at Wotton House, Buckinghamshire.

With no male issue, the dukedom and marquessate of Buckingham and Chandos and the Earldom of Temple became extinct. Several of his other titles survived due to available heirs: his nephew William Gore-Langton succeeded him in 1892 as fourth Earl Temple of Stowe, which was created with a special remainder; his eldest daughter, Lady Mary, succeeded him in the Scottish lordship of Kinloss, which can be held by females, as Lady Kinloss; and his distant relative Charles Lyttelton succeeded him as eighth Viscount Cobham.

== Family ==
Buckingham married firstly Caroline Harvey, daughter of Robert Harvey of Langley Park, Sheriff of Buckinghamshire, and sister of Sir Robert Harvey, 1st Baronet of Langley Park, in 1851. They had three daughters:

- Mary Morgan-Grenville, 11th Lady Kinloss (1852–1944)
- Lady Anne (1853–1890)
- Lady Caroline Jemima Elizabeth (1858–1946)

Caroline, Duchess of Buckingham and Chandos, died in February 1874.

Buckingham married, secondly, Alice Graham-Montgomery, daughter of Sir Graham Graham-Montgomery, 3rd Baronet, in 1885. Born in 1848, she was 25 years younger than he. In 1897, she was one of the guests at the Duchess of Devonshire's Diamond Jubilee Costume Ball. There were no children from this marriage. Widowed in 1889, Alice, Dowager Duchess of Buckingham and Chandos, married the 1st Earl Egerton in 1894. She died in 1931, aged 83.

== See also ==
- 1st (Hanover Square) Middlesex Artillery Volunteer Corps

Parliament of the United Kingdom
Preceded by Sir Thomas Fremantle, Bt; John Hall	Member of Parliament for Buckingham; 1846–1857; With: John Hall	Succeeded by John Hall; Sir Harry Verney, Bt
Political offices
Preceded by The Earl Granville	Lord President of the Council; 1866–1867	Succeeded by The Duke of Marlborough
Preceded by The Earl of Carnarvon	Secretary of State for the Colonies; 1867–1868	Succeeded by The Earl Granville
Preceded by Lord Hobart	Governor of Madras; 1875–1880	Succeeded by William Patrick Adam
Honorary titles
Preceded by The Lord Carrington	Lord Lieutenant of Buckinghamshire; 1868–1889	Succeeded by The Lord Rothschild
Peerage of the United Kingdom
Preceded by Richard Temple-Grenville	Duke of Buckingham and Chandos; 1861–1889	Extinct
Preceded by Richard Temple-Grenville	Earl Temple of Stowe; 1861–1889	Succeeded by William Gore-Langton
Peerage of Great Britain
Preceded by Richard Temple-Grenville	Marquess of Buckingham; 1861–1889	Extinct
Preceded by Richard Temple-Grenville	Viscount Cobham; 1861–1889	Succeeded by Charles Lyttelton
Peerage of Ireland
Preceded by Richard Temple-Grenville	Earl Nugent; 1861–1889	Extinct
Peerage of Scotland
Preceded by Richard Temple-Grenville	Lord Kinloss; 1861–1889 (proven 1868)	Succeeded by Mary Morgan-Grenville
