= William de Brus =

William de Brus may refer to:

- William de Brus, 3rd Lord of Annandale (died 1212)
- William de Brus (fl. 1294), Anglo-Scottish knight
