= Robert de Brus, 5th Lord of Annandale =

Regent of Scotland and competitor for the Scottish throne

Robert de Brus
- Lord of Annandale, Lord of Ireby, Constable of Carlisle Castle, Sheriff of Cumberland
- Coat of arms as Lord of Annandale: Or, a saltire and a chief Gules
- Predecessor: Robert de Brus, 4th Lord of Annandale
- Successor: Robert de Brus, 6th Lord of Annandale
- Born: c. 1210–1215
- Died: 31 March 1295 (aged 80–85); Lochmaben Castle, Annandale, Kingdom of Scotland
- Buried: Gisborough Priory, Guisborough, Yorkshire
- Spouses: Isabella of Gloucester and Hertford; Christina de Ireby
- Issue: 5, including Robert de Brus, 6th Lord of Annandale; Richard de Brus
- Father: Robert de Brus, 4th Lord of Annandale
- Mother: Isobel of Huntingdon

Robert de Brus, 5th Lord of Annandale (commonly known as Robert the Competitor; c.1210–1215 – 31 March 1295) was a feudal lord, justice, and constable in both the Kingdoms of Scotland and England, served as a regent of Scotland, and was a claimant to the Scottish throne during the succession dispute of 1290–1292, known as the Great Cause. His grandson, Robert the Bruce, later became King of Scots

== Life ==
=== Early life ===
Robert was son of Robert de Brus, 4th Lord of Annandale and Isobel of Huntingdon. Widely known as Robert the Noble, he was also grandson of David of Scotland, 8th Earl of Huntingdon, and Matilda de Kevilloc of Chester, great-grandson of Henry of Scotland, Earl of Huntingdon and Northumberland, and Ada de Warenne, and great-great-grandson of King David I of Scotland and Maud, Countess of Huntingdon.

In addition to Annandale, Robert was Lord of Hartlepool (otherwise known as Hartness) in county Durham, and Writtle and Hatfield Broadoak in Essex, England. His first wife brought to him the village of Ripe, in Sussex, and his second wife the Lordship of Ireby in Cumberland.

His possessions were increased following the defeat of Simon de Montfort at the Battle of Evesham (1265), via a series of grants that included the estates of former rebel barons. Henry III also re-appointed Robert a Justice, and Constable of Carlisle Castle and keeper of the Castle there in 1267, a position he had been dismissed from in 1255. Robert sought a pardon from Alexander and probably joined the princes Edward and Edmund on their crusade, as Robert if not Richard possibly failed to attend, or returned early, as the younger Robert is recorded as receiving a quitclaim in Writtle, Essex, in October 1271.

In 1271–72, Robert obtained the hand of Marjorie of Carrick for his son, also called Robert de Brus. Marjorie was the daughter and heiress of Niall, 2nd Earl of Carrick, and his wife and cousin Margaret Stewart. Around this time, Robert's first wife Isabella de Clare of Gloucester and Hertford died. The last recording of her is that she received a gift of deer from King Henry in Essex in 1271.

On 3 May 1273, Robert married Christina de Ireby, the widow of Adam Jesmond, the Sheriff of Northumberland. This marriage added estates in Cumberland and dower land from her previous husband to the Brus holdings. Following the marriage, Robert appears to have restricted himself to the management of the family's northern possessions, leaving the southern to his sons.

Robert Bruce was Regent of Scotland some time during minority of his second cousin King Alexander III of Scotland (1241–1286) and was occasionally recognised as a tanist of the Scottish throne. He was the closest surviving male relative to the king: Margaret of Huntingdon's descendants were all females up until birth of Hugh Balliol sometime in the 1260s. When Alexander yet was childless, he was officially named as heir presumptive, but never gained the throne as Alexander managed to beget three children.

The succession in the main line of the House of Dunkeld became highly precarious when towards the end of Alexander's reign, all three of his children died within a few years. The middle-aged Alexander III induced in 1284 the Estates to recognise as his heir-presumptive his granddaughter Margaret, called the "Maid of Norway", his only surviving descendant.

The need for a male heir led Alexander to contract a second marriage to Yolande de Dreux on 1 November 1285. All this was eventually in vain. Alexander died suddenly, in a fall from his horse, when only 45 years old, in 1286.

His death ushered in a time of political upheaval for Scotland. His three-year-old granddaughter Margaret, who lived in Norway, was recognised as his successor. However, the then-seven-year-old heiress Margaret died, travelling towards her kingdom, on the Orkney islands around 26 September 1290. With her death, the main royal line came to an end and thirteen claimants asserted their rights to the Scottish throne.

=== The Great Cause ===
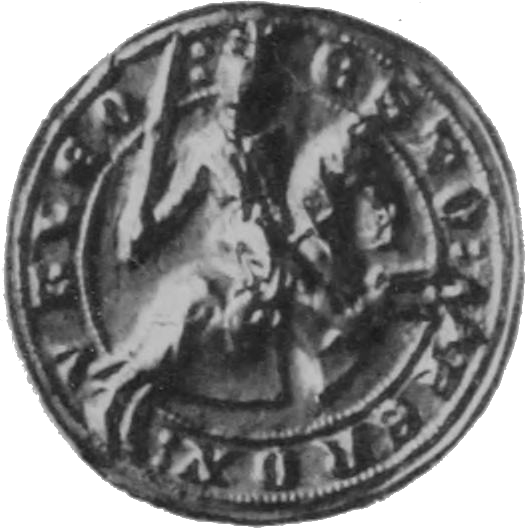
Photograph of a seal of Robert Bruce V, Lord of Annandale, 1291

After this extinction of the senior line of the Scottish royal house (the line of William I of Scotland) David of Huntingdon's descendants were the primary candidates for the throne. The two most notable claimants to the throne, John Balliol and Robert himself represented descent through David's daughters Margaret and Isobel, respectively.

Robert Bruce pleaded tanistry and proximity of blood in the succession dispute. He descended from the second daughter of David of Huntingdon, whereas John Balliol descended from the eldest, and thus had the lineal right. However, Robert was a second cousin of King Alexander of Scotland and descended in fourth generation from King David I of Scotland, whereas John Balliol was a second cousin once removed from Alexander III and third cousin once removed of presumptive Queen Margaret and descended in fifth generation from King David I, the most recent common ancestor who had been Scottish king. The ensuing 'Great Cause' was concluded in 1292. It gave the Crown of Scotland to his family's great rival, John Balliol. The events took place as follows:

Soon after the death of young queen Margaret, Robert Bruce raised a body of men with the help of the earls of Mar and Atholl and marched to Perth with a considerable following and uncertain intentions. Bishop William Fraser of St. Andrews, worried of the possibility of civil war, wrote to King Edward I of England, asking for his assistance in choosing a new monarch.

Edward took this chance to demand sasine of the Scottish royal estate, but agreed to pass judgment in return for recognition of his suzerainty. The guardians of Scotland denied him this, but Robert Bruce was quick to pay homage. All the claimants swore oaths of homage, and John Balliol was the last to do so. The guardians were forced to concede and were thus reinstated by Edward. Judgment processed slowly. On 3 August 1291 Edward asked both Balliol and Bruce to choose forty auditors while he himself chose twenty-four, to decide the case. After considering all of the arguments, in early November 1292 the court decided in favour of John Balliol, having the superior claim in feudal law, not to mention greater support from the kingdom of Scotland. In accordance with this, final judgement was given by Edward on 17 November. On 30 November, John Balliol was crowned as King of Scots at Scone Abbey. On 26 December, at Newcastle upon Tyne, King John swore homage to Edward for the kingdom of Scotland. Edward soon made it clear that he regarded the country as his vassal state. The Bruce family thus lost what they regarded as their rightful place on the Scottish throne.

=== Later years ===
Robert, 5th Lord of Annandale resigned the lordship of Annandale and his claim to the throne to his eldest son Robert de Brus. Shortly afterwards, in 1292, the younger Robert's wife Marjorie of Carrick died and the earldom of Carrick, which Robert had ruled jure uxoris, devolved upon their eldest son, also called Robert, the future King.

In 1292, Robert V de Brus held a market at Ireby, Cumberland, in right of his wife. The following year he had a market at Hartlepool, county Durham within the liberties of the Bishop of Durham.

Sir Robert de Brus died at Lochmaben Castle and was buried at Gisborough Priory in Cleveland.

== Family and children ==
He married firstly on 12 May 1240 Lady Isabella de Clare (2 November 1226 – after 10 July 1264), daughter of Gilbert de Clare, 4th Earl of Hertford and 5th Earl of Gloucester and Lady Isabel Marshal, with issue:

- Isabel de Brus (1249 – c. 1284), married (as his first wife) Sir John FitzMarmaduke, Knt., of Horden, Eighton, Lamesley, Ravensholm, and Silksworth, County Durham, Sheriff of North Durham, and joint warden beyond the Scottish Sea between the Firth of Forth and Orkney. He fought on the English side at the Battle of Falkirk, 22 July 1298, and was present at the Siege of Caerlaverock Castle in 1300. In 1307 he was commanded to assist the Earl of Richmond in expelling Robert de Brus and the Scottish rebels from Galloway. In 1309 his armour and provisions in a vessel bound for Perth were arrested off Great Yarmouth. He was governor of St. John's Town (Perth) in 1310 until his death. Isabel was buried at Easington, County Durham.
- Robert VI de Bruce, 6th Lord of Annandale, Earl of Carrick (1243–1304)
- William de Brus, married Elizabeth de Sully, without issue
- John de Brus (d. 1275), alleged ancestor of Barons of Clackmannan, Earls of Elgin, Kincardine and Ailesbury
- Richard de Brus (died ca. 26 January 1287), unmarried and without issue.

He married, secondly on 3 May 1275 at Hoddam, in the diocese of Glasgow, Christina (died ca. 1305 or 1305), daughter and heiress of Sir William de Ireby, of Ireby, Cumbria. They had no issue.

== Ancestry ==
Ancestors of Robert de Brus, 5th Lord of Annandale

16. Robert de Brus, 1st Lord of Annandale
8. Robert de Brus, 2nd Lord of Annandale
17. Agness de Pagnell
4. William de Brus, 3rd Lord of Annandale
9. Euphemia de Aumale
2. Robert de Brus, 4th Lord of Annandale
20. Fergus of Galloway
10. Uhtred of Galloway
5. Christina Mac Uhtred
22. Waltheof of Allerdale
11. Gunhilda of Dunbar
1. Robert de Brus, 5th Lord of Annandale
24. David I of Scotland
12. Henry of Scotland, 3rd Earl of Huntingdon
25. Maud, 2nd Countess of Huntingdon
6. David of Scotland, Earl of Huntingdon
26. William de Warenne, 2nd Earl of Surrey
13. Ada de Warenne
27. Elizabeth of Vermandois, Countess of Leicester
3. Isobel of Huntingdon
28. Ranulf de Gernon, 4th Earl of Chester
14. Hugh de Kevelioc, 5th Earl of Chester
29. Maud of Gloucester, Countess of Chester
7. Matilda of Chester, Countess of Huntingdon
30. Simon III de Montfort
15. Bertrade de Montfort of Evreux
31. Maud

== See also ==
- John Balliol (play)

== Notes ==
- Mackay, Aeneas James George (1886). "Bruce, Robert (1210-1295)" . In Stephen, Leslie (ed.). Dictionary of National Biography. Vol. 7. London: Smith, Elder & Co. pp. 115–116.

Baronage of Scotland
| Preceded by Robert IV de Brus | Lord of Annandale; 1226 x 1233–1295 | Succeeded by Robert VI de Brus |
