= Robert IV =

Robert IV may refer to:

- Robert IV the Strong (820 – July 2, 866)
- Robert IV de Sablé (Grand Master of the Knights Templar from 1191 to 1193 and Lord of Cyprus from 1191 to 1192, died on 23 September 1193)
- Robert de Beaumont, 4th Earl of Leicester (died c. 21 October 1204)
- Robert de Brus, 4th Lord of Annandale (c. 1195 – 1226–1233)
- Robert IV, Count of Nassau (died c. 1240)
- Robert IV, Count of Dreux (1241–1282)
- Robert IV of Artois, Count of Eu (1356 – July 20, 1387)
- Robert IV de la Marck (15 January 1512 – 4 November 1556)
