= Robert of Scotland =

Robert of Scotland may refer to:

- Robert de Brus, 5th Lord of Annandale, claimant to the Scottish throne 1290–92, sometime regent of Scotland
- Robert I of Scotland
- Robert II of Scotland
- Robert III of Scotland
- Robert, 1st Duke of Albany, Regent of Scotland
