= Isabel de Clare =

Isabel de Clare may refer to:

- Isabel de Clare, 4th Countess of Pembroke (1172–1220)
- Isabella of Gloucester and Hertford (1226-1264)
