= Ralph Tailboys =

12th century English noble

Ralph Tailboys, (Note: Also known as Ralph fitz Ribald and Ralph de Taillebois.) (fl. 1130–67) Lord of Middleham was an Anglo-Breton knight from Yorkshire. He was a son of Ribald de Bretagne, himself the bastard son of Odo, Count of Penthièvre, and Beatrice de Taillebois.

When Ribald became a monk, following the death of his wife, his lands were passed to Ralph.

Ralph was a tenant of count Stephen. He married Agatha, daughter of William de Brus, Lord of Annandale and Christina. He is known to have had two sons, Ribald and Robert.
