= John FitzMarmaduke =

13th-14th century English noble

Arms of John FitzMarmaduke: Gules, a fess between three popinjays argent.

Sir John FitzMarmaduke (died 1311), Lord of Horden, Eighton, Lamesley, Ravensholm, and Silksworth, Sheriff of North Durham, and Joint Warden beyond the Scottish Sea between the Firth of Forth and Orkney, was an English knight from Durham.

He was the son of Marmaduke FitzGeoffrey. He fought at the Battle of Falkirk and was at the siege of Caerlaverock Castle. With the Earl of Richmond he was engaged in trying to expel King Robert de Brus from Galloway. The vessel carrying his armour and provisions for Perth was captured off Great Yarmouth. He was the governor of St. John's Town (Perth) from 1310 until his death in 1311. He is buried at St Mary and St Cuthbert Churchyard, Durham, where his alabaster effigy is located.

== Marriage and issue ==
John married Isabel, daughter of Robert de Brus, 5th Lord of Annandale, and Isabella de Clare, they are known to have had the following issue:

- Richard FitzMarmaduke
- Mary FitzMarmaduke

Isabel was buried at Easington, County Durham.
