= Lord of Annandale =

Lordship in southern Scotland

The Lordship of Annandale was a sub-comital lordship in southern Scotland (Annandale) established by David I of Scotland by 1124 for his follower Robert de Brus. The following were holders of the office:

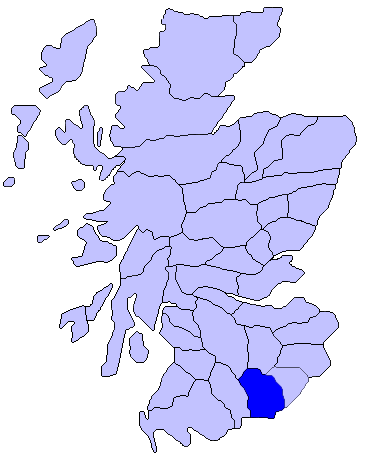
Extent of Lordship of Annandale

- Robert de Brus, 1st Lord of Annandale, 1113 x 1124-1138
- Robert de Brus, 2nd Lord of Annandale, 1138 x-1194
- William de Brus, 3rd Lord of Annandale, 1194-1211 x 1212
- Robert de Brus, 4th Lord of Annandale, 1211 x 1212-1226 x 1233
- Robert de Brus, 5th Lord of Annandale, 1226 x 1233–1292; resigned the lordship to Annadale on the accession of John Balliol in 1292.
- Robert de Brus, 6th Lord of Annandale, 1292-1295
- John Comyn III of Badenoch, 1295–1296; Annandale seized and granted to John on Robert's refusal to attend the Scottish host.
- Robert de Brus, 6th Lord of Annandale, 1296-1304
- Robert de Brus, 7th Lord of Annandale (King Robert), 1304-1312
- Thomas Randolph, 8th Lord of Annandale, 1312–32
- Thomas Randolph, 9th Lord of Annandale, 1332
- John Randolph, 10th Lord of Annandale, 1332–46
- Agnes Randolph, 11th Lady of Annandale, 1346-1369
  - m. Patrick Dunbar, 9th Earl of Dunbar
- George de Dunbar, 12th Lord of Annandale, 1369-1401/9 (although under part English control until 1384; conquered by Douglas in 1401 after Dunbar went over to the English; Douglas possession confirmed in 1409)
- Archibald Douglas, 13th Lord of Annandale, 1401/9-24
- Archibald Douglas, 14th Lord of Annandale, 1424-1439
- William Douglas, 15th Lord of Annandale, 1439–40
- Annexed to Crown
- Alexander Stewart, 16th Lord of Annandale, 1455-1485
- John Stewart, 17th Lord of Annandale ?, 1485-1536
- Crown

== See also ==
- Baronage of Scotland
- Earl of Carrick
- Scotland in the High Middle Ages
- Earldom of Annandale
