= Richard de Brus (died 1287) =

13th century English noble

Arms of Sir Richard de Brus: Gules, a saltire and chief or.

Sir Richard de Brus (died 1287), Lord of Writtle was an English knight from Essex, commanding a Knight banneret for Edward I. He was a younger son of Robert de Brus, 5th Lord of Annandale and Isabella de Clare.

Richard was a part of King Edward I of England's household and may have been with Edward during his crusade.

He participated in Edward's Conquest of Wales, and awarded command of Denbigh, in 1280.

He was a signatory of the Turnberry Band, a pact between Scottish and Anglo-Irish nobles signed on 20 September 1286 at Turnberry Castle, Ayrshire, Scotland.

Richard also held lands at Tottenham and Kempston, and is recorded as receiving a number of wards and gifts of deer and to have sought permission to empark the forest at Writtle.

He is recorded to have died in 1287. He never married and his lands reverted to his father.
