= Robert de Brus, 4th Lord of Annandale =

Scottish nobleman (c. 1195 – 1232)

Robert de Brus
- 4th Lord of Annandale
- Coat of arms as Lord of Annandale: Or, a saltire and a chief Gules
- Predecessor: William de Brus, 3rd Lord of Annandale
- Successor: Robert de Brus, 5th Lord of Annandale
- Born: c. 1195
- Died: 1232 (aged 36–37)
- Buried: Gisborough Priory, Guisborough, Yorkshire
- Noble family: Bruce
- Spouse: Isobel of Huntingdon
- Issue: Robert de Brus, 5th Lord of Annandale; Bernard de Brus of Exton
- Father: William de Brus, 3rd Lord of Annandale
- Mother: Christina mac Uchtred

Robert de Brus, the Noble (c. 1195–1245) was 4th Lord of Annandale.

== Life ==
He was the son of William de Brus, 3rd Lord of Annandale, and Christina mac Uhtred.

Robert had the same name as both his uncle and his grandfather. His uncle died before becoming Lord of Annandale, and therefore his father, William, inherited the title, becoming 3rd Lord of Annandale. Robert married ca. 1219 Isobel of Huntingdon, the second daughter of David of Scotland, 8th Earl of Huntingdon, by which marriage he acquired the manors of Writtle and Hatfield Broadoak, Essex in England. They had two sons and one daughter:

- Robert de Brus, 5th Lord of Annandale, married firstly Isabella de Clare, with issue; married secondly Christina de Ireby, without issue.
- Bernard de Brus of Exton, married firstly Alice de Beauchamp, daughter of William de Beauchamp of Elmley, and married secondly Constance de Merston, widow of John de Morteyn; was the father of Sir Bernard de Brus II.
- Beatrice de Brus, married Hugo de Neville.

Robert died in 1232, and was survived by his wife Isobel. He was buried in the family mausoleum Gisborough Priory

== Notes ==
Baronage of Scotland
Preceded by William de Brus	Lord of Annandale; 1211 x 1212 - 1226 x 1233	Succeeded by Robert de Brus, 5th Lord of Annandale
