= Gisborough Priory =

Ruined Augustinian priory in Guisborough, North Yorkshire, England

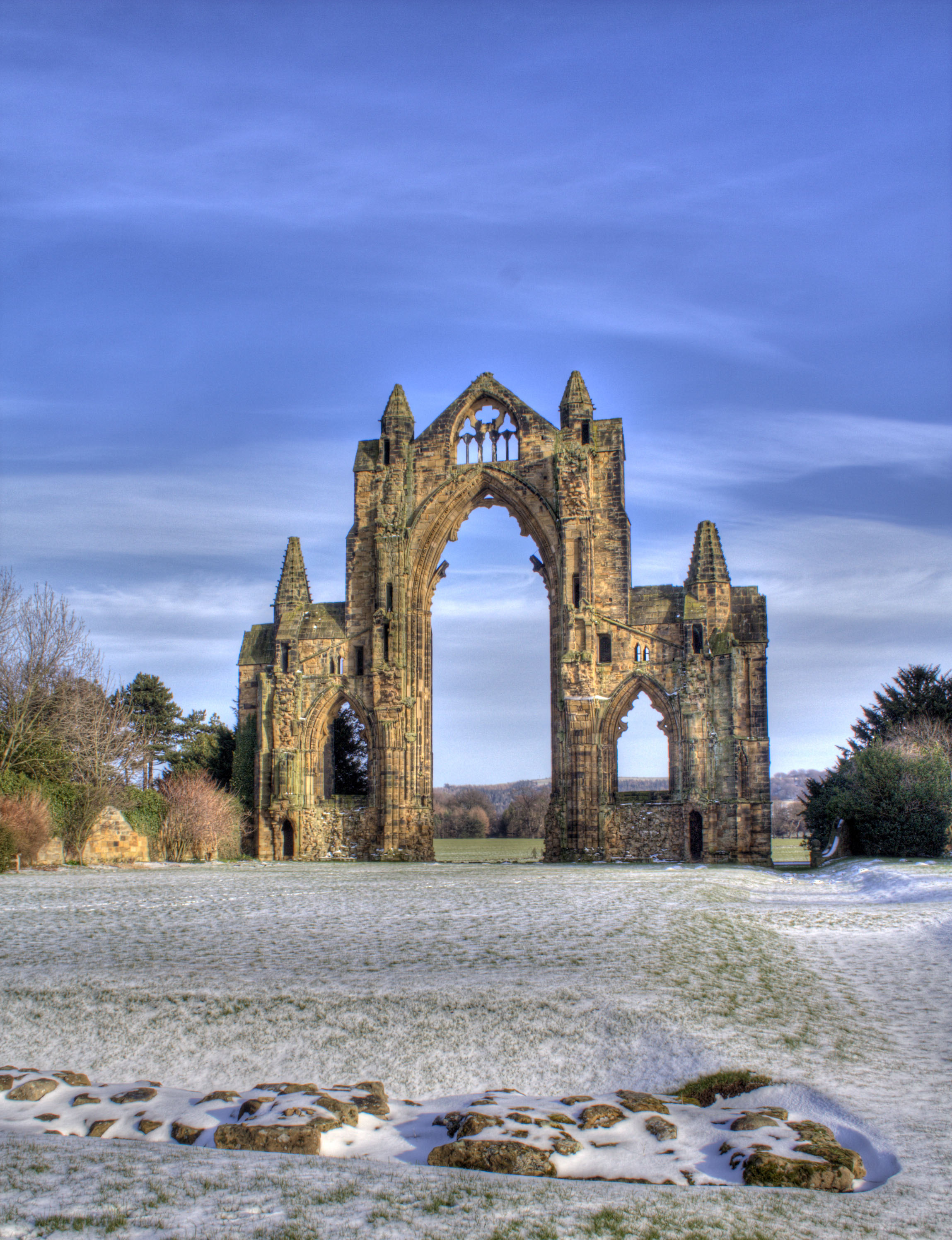
- Gisborough Priory
- Interactive map of Gisborough Priory

Monastery information
- Full name: Priory of St Mary of Gisborough
- Order: Augustinian
- Established: Around 1119
- Disestablished: 8 April 1540
- Dedication: God and the Holy Virgin Mary
- Diocese: York

People
- Founder: Robert de Brus

Site
- Location: Guisborough, North Yorkshire, England
- Coordinates: 54°32′10.56″N 1°2′53.03″W
- Grid reference: NZ617160
- Visible remains: East window, west range, gatehouse, cellarium, dovecote
- Public access: Yes (English Heritage)
- Website: Guisborough Priory via English Heritage

Gisborough Priory is a ruined Augustinian priory in Guisborough in the borough of Redcar and Cleveland, North Yorkshire, England. It was founded in 1119 as the Priory of St Mary by the Norman feudal magnate Robert de Brus, an ancestor of the Scottish king, Robert the Bruce. It became one of the richest monastic foundations in England with grants from the crown and bequests from de Brus, other nobles and gentry and local people of more modest means. Much of the Romanesque Norman priory was destroyed in a fire in 1289. It was rebuilt in the Gothic style on a grander scale over the following century. Its remains are regarded as among the finest surviving examples of early Gothic architecture in England.

The priory prospered until the Dissolution of the Monasteries in 1540, when it was abolished along with England's other monastic communities. The priory buildings were demolished and the stone re-used in other buildings in Guisborough. The east end of the priory church was left standing with its great window forming a distinctive arch, a well-known landmark used as a symbol for Guisborough. It became part of the estate of the Chaloner family, who acquired it in 1550. The east window was preserved by them as part of a Romantic vista adjoining their seat, Gisborough Hall, from which the priory takes its idiosyncratically spelled name. It is owned by the Chaloners but is in the care of English Heritage as a scheduled monument.

Since the 19th century archaeological excavations have taken place in the priory grounds, though a substantial part of the site has not yet been investigated. In addition to the east window, surviving visible fragments of the complex include the lower courses of the west range, a vaulted undercroft, a gateway and a 14th-century dovecote still in use today. The adjoining Priory Gardens, laid out by the Chaloners in the 18th century, have been used to cultivate cut flowers since 1962. The priory ruins are open to the public between March and November. The Gardens are open on occasional days through the summer for visitors to pick their own flowers.

== History ==
=== Establishment ===
Guisborough was well-established at the time of the priory's founding; the town's name refers to the fortified place of a Scandinavian called Gigr, who may have taken over a site established by the Anglo-Saxons or Romans who lived in the vicinity before the arrival of Vikings in the 8th and 9th centuries. A priest, church and mill were recorded in 1086 in the Domesday Book which refers to the town as "Ghigesburg". Following the Norman Conquest, William the Conqueror gave lands in the area to the Count of Mortain. He passed them to his friend Robert de Brus, Lord of Skelton, one of the largest landowners in the north, owning more than 40,000 acres (160 km^{2}) in Yorkshire alone. William's Harrying of the North left the region in a severely depressed and depopulated state. There were few monasteries north of the River Humber and opportunities existed for new agricultural and religious developments. The Augustinian order came to England at the start of the 12th century and established houses in England, including major ones at Bridlington, Nostell and Kirkham. They were communities of canons living under the rule of St. Augustine, wearing dark robes that earned them the name the "Black Canons".

According to the priory's founding charter, Robert de Brus "founded a certain Monastery of a religious order in Gysburne [sic], to the honour of God, and the holy Virgin Mary". He gave "to the same Church and the service of God in it, all Gysburne, with all things pertaining thereto it". The gift included lands amounting to twenty carucates and two oxgangs (roughly equivalent to about 2,500 acres (10 km^{2})), churches, mills and other possessions, and grants from others. The charter started that the endowment was to provide "material for ever for their buildings, and all other necessities of their house". The foundation was authorised by Pope Calixtus II and Thurstan, Archbishop of York. De Brus may have been emulating his peers in Yorkshire, who had founded monastic institutions for their religious obligations. The date of the foundation is unclear. The 14th-century canon and historian Walter of Guisborough gives it as 1129, but a charter of confirmation from Pope Calixtus dates to the period of his pontificate between 1119–24. The priory may have had two foundation charters, a shorter one dating possibly to 1119 and a detailed one dating to 1129 that may have been the definitive document. Robert de Brus appointed his younger brother, William de Brus, to be the first Prior of Gisborough and the Brus family continued to be the primary patrons of the priory and have a strong influence there.

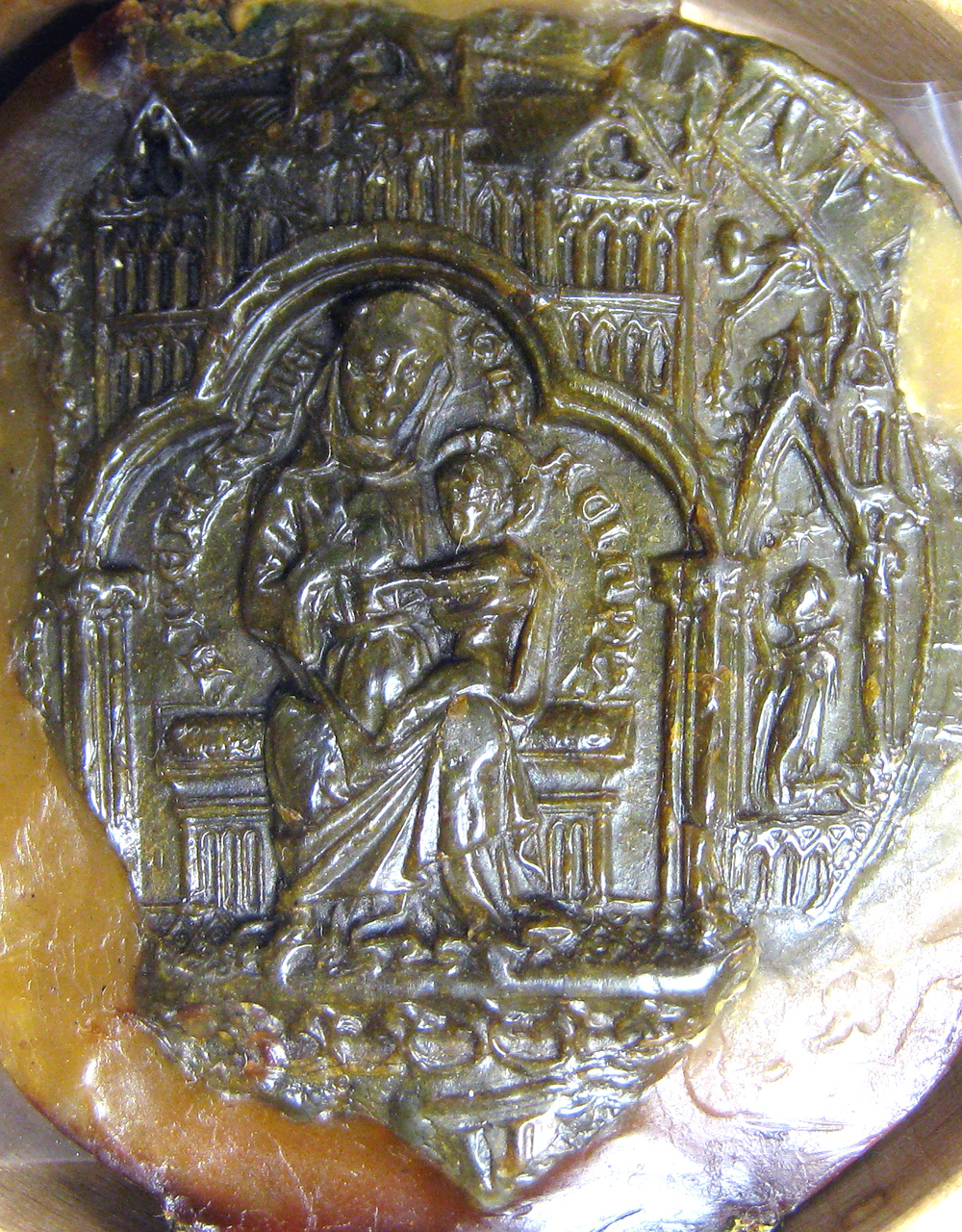
Chapter seal of Gisborough Priory, 1538. The seal depicts the Virgin Mary with the infant Christ, sitting under a canopy in the shape of a church.

The rights and privileges of the prior and canons grew over the centuries added to by royal grants. Henry III granted the rights of soc and sac, thol and theam and infangtheof. He established a Monday market at Guisborough and the right to hold an annual three-day fair to mark the feast of the Assumption (15 August). The proceeds and fees from these events supported the priory. The prior and canons were granted free warren in the lands around Guisborough and several nearby villages which was extended to more demesnes by Edward III, who permitted them to convert 80 acres (320,000 m^{2}) of land into a deer park (now Park Wood). Henry IV gave them the twice-yearly right of frankpledge, the right of waif and stray and the return of briefs and writs which gave the priory a steady income from rents, fines, licences and other fees. The canons of Guisborough owned 4,000 sheep, mostly in Eskdale, in the 13th and 14th century.

The priory became known for its strict observance of the Augustinian rule and religious precepts. Its reputation for ducentes canonicam vitam ("living a canonical life") attracted Saint Malachy from Ireland who, as Saint Bernard of Clairvaux had a long and close involvement with Gisborough. The canons were closely associated with the Cistercians who, like the Augustianians, had a reformist outlook. One Gisborough canon, William of Newminster, moved to the Cistercian Fountains Abbey to become its abbot. The priory was supported by the local people and records survive of numerous small grants, related to the almonry (the place or chamber where alms were distributed to the poor) and to support building work. The canons leased, bought and sold land and loaned money using property grants as collateral to benefit the priory's building fund. As the priory became more wealthy, discipline among its canons slipped and the Archbishops of York found it necessary to take corrective action in the late 13th century. A number of canons were sent to Kirkham and Bridlington for correction and Gisborough in turn took in disobedient canons from other places. The priory also became embroiled in a dispute with a local landowner, Robert de Thweng, who raided its properties and tithe barns in 1232 under the alias of "Will Wither", in the course of a dispute with the priory over the advowson of Kirkleatham parish church.

On 16 May 1289, the priory suffered a catastrophic fire. According to an account by Walter of Guisborough, a plumber soldering the lead roof forgot to put out his fire, causing the roof timbers to catch fire and molten lead ran down into the church below. Much of the building was destroyed and many effects, costly books, chalices and vestments were lost. The canons sought to raise funds for rebuilding. They petitioned the king to grant them the advowsons of the parish churches of Barnham, Easington and Heslerton, and in 1309 and 1311 the Archbishop of York and the Bishop of Durham rewarded the priory's donors with indulgences granting remission of temporal punishment for sins. Most of the nave and chancel was rebuilt with the support of the de Brus family, whose coat of arms was displayed on its buildings.

Rebuilding probably took around a century to complete. Work was slowed by high costs and civil unrest in the early 14th century, when Scottish raiders repeatedly plundered the north of England. The priory's lands were reduced in value by the raids, diminishing its income. Its wealth was tapped by Archbishop Melton of York to make good his own losses in 1319, and in 1320 it had to take in refugees from monastic houses that had been forced to disperse to escape the raiders. Probably as a consequence of the troubles, in 1328 the priory petitioned the king to be exempted from the "clerical tenth" (a 10% tax on clerical property) and in 1344 it was granted permission to fortify its buildings. By 1380 its staff had diminished to 26 canons and two lay brothers.

The Yorkshire line of the de Brus family died out with the death of the childless Peter IV de Brus in 1272 but the priory was still patronised by the local nobility. The Fauconberg and Thweng families, who married Peter's sisters Agnes and Lucia, took over the patronage which continued for several centuries. Many prominent local nobles were buried there, as was the Scottish Robert V de Brus, grandfather of King Robert the Bruce. At least nine patrons and their families were buried in the priory between 1295 and 1411. The priory received substantial financial support from its patrons; in 1381 William, Lord Latimer provided funds to complete the north nave and donated £333 6s 8d (roughly equivalent to £1.6 million today) for a new belfry. He left the priory cattle from his manor at Ugthorpe, bequeathed a range of religious items, and made arrangements for his body to be interred there on his death.

=== Dissolution and after ===
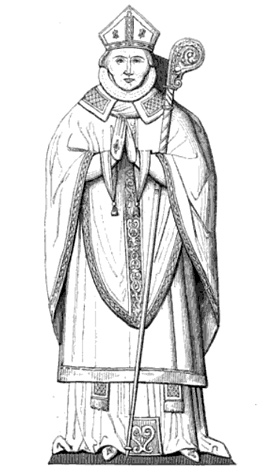
Prior Robert Pursglove, the last prior of Gisborough Priory

In 1533 Henry VIII of England was excommunicated for divorcing Catherine of Aragon. The Act of Supremacy passed in 1534 declared Henry Supreme Head of the Church of England and the church's estate in England became part of the king's estate. In 1535 Henry ordered a comprehensive survey of the church's property, the Valor Ecclesiasticus. It found that Gisborough Priory had an annual net value of £628.6s.8d., which made it the fourth wealthiest monastic house in Yorkshire. In 1536 monasteries with less than £200 of annual income were suppressed, exempting the priory from the first wave of suppression.

A second survey carried out by the king's commissioners, Thomas Legh and Richard Leyton, provided for the final suppression on charges of a lack of quality of religious life. Prior James Cockerell of Guisborough was forced to resign and was replaced by Robert Pursglove, who was loyal to the king. The priory's dissolution was not welcomed by locals, who derived economic benefit from its presence – in 1536, around 500 families depended on it for their livelihood. The strength of feeling was recorded in a letter from Lord Conyers and Sir John Bulmer to Thomas Cromwell: "On Sunday, 11th July [1539], at Gysburn in Yorkshire, when the parish priest was declaring the articles [of dissolution] directed by the King to the Archbishop of York, one John Atkeynson alias Brotton came violently and took book forth of the priest's hands, and pulled it in pieces." Popular discontent sparked the Pilgrimage of Grace, in which Prior Cockerell was implicated. When the revolt failed, he was hanged at Tyburn in London with the Prior of Bridlington, the Abbot of Jervaulx and the former Abbot of Fountains.

The priory was formally dissolved on 8 April 1540 and surrendered to the king's men on 22 December 1540, making it one of the last monastic houses in England to be suppressed. A proposal to found a secular college there came to nothing and the priory buildings – with the exception of the gatehouses and the great east window – were demolished. On 21 November 1541 Thomas Legh was granted a lease "of the buildings with the site and precincts of the Priory to be then demolished and carried away." Demolition was carried out by collapsing its central tower into the body of the church, crushing it in its fall and reducing it to rubble.

The site and lands were re-let in 1550 to Sir Thomas Chaloner, who later purchased the property outright. The Chaloners occupied the former priors' quarters in the west range before moving to their new mansion, Old Gisborough Hall, on Bow Street in the late-17th century. The priory remains were cleared and the fallen stonework looted or sold. The grounds were redeveloped as formal gardens within the grounds of Old Gisborough Hall. John Walker Ord, a local historian in the mid-19th century, described how the priory's stonework could be seen in many buildings around Guisborough. He deplored the profane uses to which it had been put:

I have seen with my own eyes broken pillars and pedestals of this august pile desecrated to the vile uses of gateposts, stands for rainwater casks, and stepping-stones over a common sewer. A richly ornamented doorway of the venerable priory forms the entrance to a privy. I have beheld with sorrow, shame, and indignation, the richly ornamented columns and carved architraves of God's temple supporting the thatch of a pig-house.

Some fragments of the priory travelled further afield. At Hardwick Hall near Sedgefield, a mock ruin was built incorporating sculptured stones brought from the priory. The priory's wealth became the stuff of local legends, one of which claimed an underground passage led from the priory to a cave under the hills in which a raven stood guard over a chest of gold.

The priory's lands around Guisborough were a source of wealth for the Chaloners. Around 1595, Sir Thomas Chaloner's son, also called Thomas, established England's first alum works at Belman Bank south of the town. Alum was an important product with a variety of industrial uses. It was especially important to the cloth industry as a mordant (a substance used to fix dyes on cloth). The supply of alum was controlled by a cartel controlled by the Papal States and Spain which were in conflict with England and exercised a virtual monopoly on the provision of alum to Christian Europe, as the import of cheaper Turkish alum was banned by Pope Paul II in the mid-15th century. Chaloner visited the Pope's alum works at Tolfa near Rome and noticed the soil and vegetation around them resembled those of his estate at Guisborough. On his return he established alum works at Belman Bank with the aid of workmen smuggled from Rome, earning him a papal excommunication. John Walker Ord casts doubt on the story, noting an account published a few decades afterwards stated that the workmen came from France and does not mention Chaloner's travels in Italy.

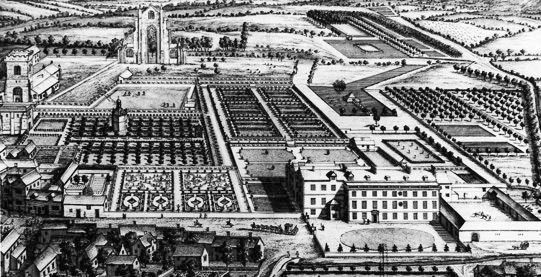
Print from 1709 showing the remains of the priory in the background, and how its land was used after the Dissolution. Old Gisborough Hall can be seen in the right foreground.

The only substantial part of the priory to survive was the eastern gable of the presbytery with its great east window. Its survival owed much to the rise of Romanticism in the 18th century. The portrayal of ruined buildings in idealised landscapes by J. M. W. Turner and his contemporaries inspired a fashion for the nobility and gentry to produce paintings of monasteries providing an incentive for landowners to preserve them as romantic ruins, rather than using them as quarries. Gisborough Priory's east window was one of the first examples of a monastic ruin to be retained for its visual qualities. It was incorporated into the grounds of Old Gisborough Hall as a romantic ruin and the sill of the great window removed to ensure an uninterrupted view. Fittingly, given his role in inspiring the east window's preservation, Turner himself sketched it in 1801 during a visit to Yorkshire.

East Lawn was laid out in front of the east window and was used for grand bazaars and fêtes until the early 20th century. A ha-ha was installed behind to keep cattle out of the grounds. To the south of the priory buildings the Long Terrace ran almost the full length of the grounds. It afforded access to the ruins via a flight of steps flanked by two carved demi-sea wolves, reflecting the coat of arms of the Chaloners. They were thought to be dragons by local people and the steps were referred to as the Dragon Steps.

Old Gisborough Hall was demolished around 1825 and the Chaloners built a mansion house, Gisborough Hall, about half a mile to the east in 1857. In 1932, Thomas Chaloner, 2nd Baron Gisborough transferred control of the priory to the Office of Works. which became the responsibility of the Ministry of Works, then the Department of the Environment and from 1984, English Heritage. It remains the property of Lord Gisborough; English Heritage is responsible for maintaining the ruins, while day-to-day running is managed by Redcar and Cleveland Borough Council.

According to folklore, the priory is haunted by the ghost of a monk in a black habit who returns annually to check that its buried treasure has not been disturbed. He is said to arrive at midnight on the year's first new moon to lower a ghostly drawbridge spanning a vanished moat. In 1966 and 1967 a hundred people turned out to watch and allegedly managed to spot a cowled figure, but in 1968 the few spectators who turned up saw nothing.

== Description of the priory buildings ==
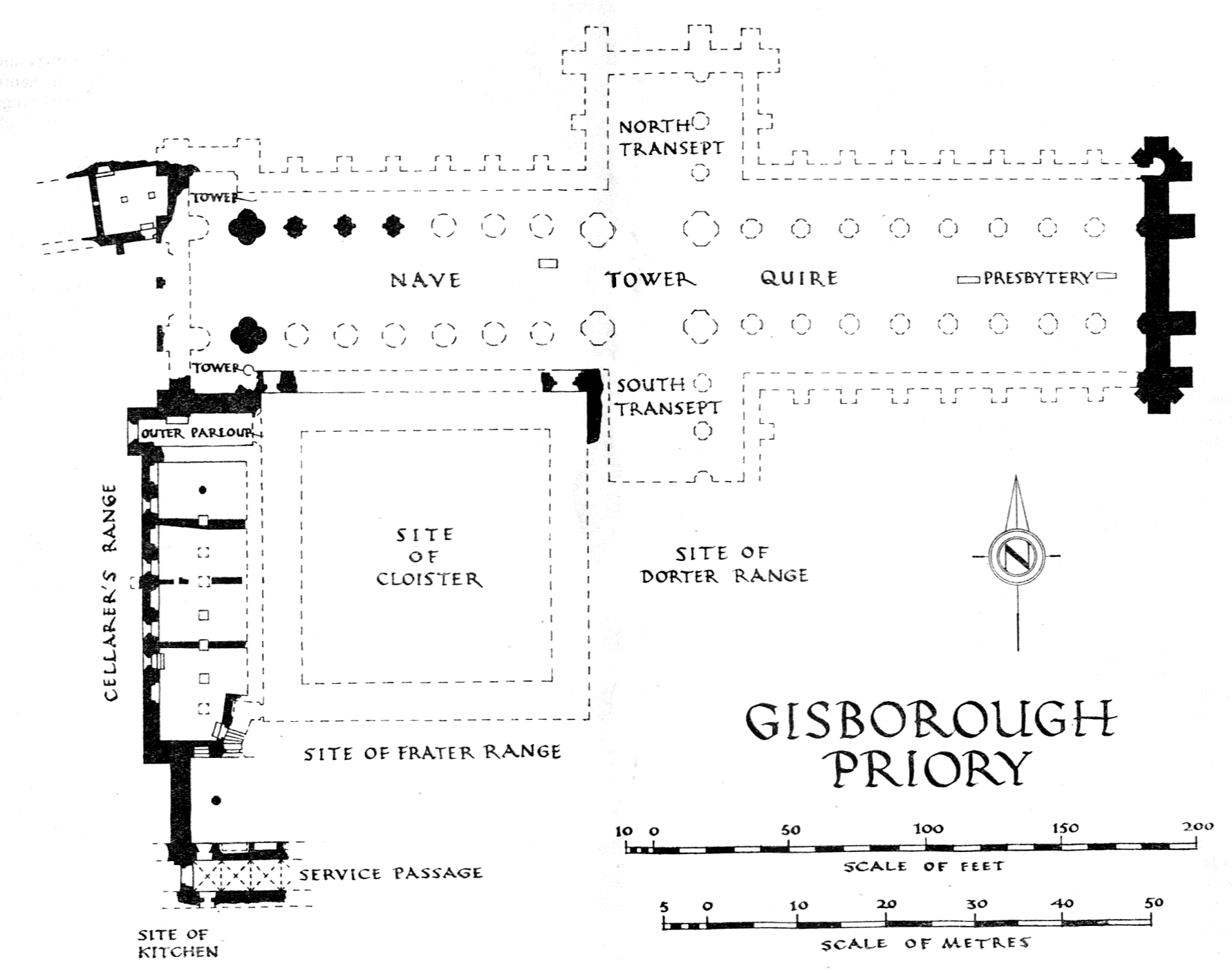
Site plan of Gisborough Priory

Gisborough Priory is characterised by a few highly visible remains. The priory church survives in a fragmentary state, dominated by the east wall of the presbytery that stands to its full height. Several of the priory church's column bases can also be seen, as can a number of excavated graves within the presbytery. Elsewhere on the site, the outline of the cloister is visible but is largely unexcavated, while the ruins of the west (or cellarer's) range constitutes the largest area of other remains above ground. A ruined gatehouse and a still-intact dovecote (the latter off-limits to visitors) stand on the western edges of the site.

=== Priory church ===
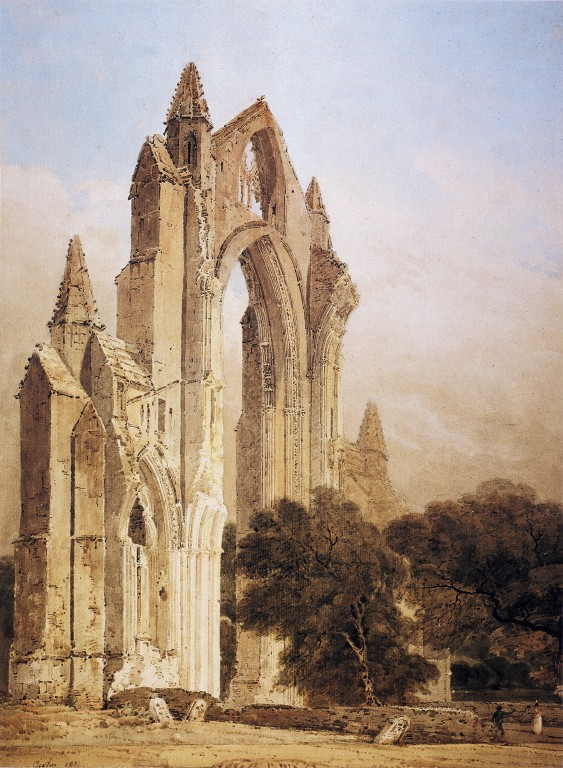
The ruins of Gisborough Priory in 1801, painted by Thomas Girtin

The remains of the priory church are dominated by the eastern gable wall of the presbytery that still stands to its full height. Its great east window is regarded as one of the finest examples of late-13th-century church architecture. The design is so close to that of the eastern arm of Ripon Cathedral, which was built around the same time, that it is thought to have been modelled on Ripon's design. The window's tracery has disappeared, as has its sill, but from the stubs and surviving fragments it can be deduced that it had seven major lights (the glazed openings in the window). At its centre was a great circle of tracery filled with trefoiled lights. The main gable of the east wall is flanked by massive buttresses capped with gables and octagonal pinnacles. A similar pair of pinnacles top the main gable, flanking a window of unusual design; a bracket projects from the lower lobe to support a statue (no longer present), possibly of the Virgin Mary, to whom the priory was dedicated.

Little remains above ground of the rest of the priory, but much can be deduced from the surviving stonework. In its final form the priory church had a nave of eight bays and a quire and presbytery of nine bays, with a total length of 351 feet (107 m). The survival of the east wall allows us to deduce that the ridge line of the roof stood 97 feet (29.6 m) above ground. The presbytery's arcades were supported by eight clustered shafts, the bases of which are still visible, with capitals carved with naturalistic foliage. The clerestory and triforium were combined into a single arch with the main arcade below. The presbytery's high vault was executed in stone with bosses decorated in red and white paint and gold leaf, traces of which were still visible when several of the bosses were found in the 19th century. The eastern bay of the presbytery was divided into several chapels and the remnants of parclose screens are visible on the main aisle's north and south responds. The main altar would have stood a short distance to the west, behind a tall screen.

At the angle of each aisle, a spiral staircase – still visible on each side of the surviving east wall – gave access to a passage inside the walls and to secondary stairs within the angles of the main gable enabling access to all parts of the building for maintenance and cleaning without requiring scaffolding. Nothing remains of the north or south transepts, which extended on the north side beyond the present boundary wall into the graveyard of St Nicholas's Church.

Several burials (presumably of high-ranking benefactors and clergy) were made within the priory and 19th-century archaeologists found stone coffins during excavations. They are visible against the east wall, but their original location was not recorded. Two centrally placed grave slabs are visible below the east window. The priory once housed the Brus cenotaph, a memorial to its founders erected in 1521. It was removed in 1540 and dismantled. Most of its parts were recovered and reassembled in the 19th century, and the reconstructed cenotaph is displayed in Saint Nicholas' Church next to the ruins.

The priory church housed a shrine to the Virgin Mary which one of the most significant Marian shrines in the north, along with others at Walsingham, Lincoln, Scarborough, Jesmond and Carlisle. Although it was destroyed during the Reformation along with the priory, it was revived in 1949 by Father Arthur Mercer, Guisborough's first Roman Catholic parish priest for 400 years, and is housed in the town's St Paulinus Church.

=== Ranges and cloister ===
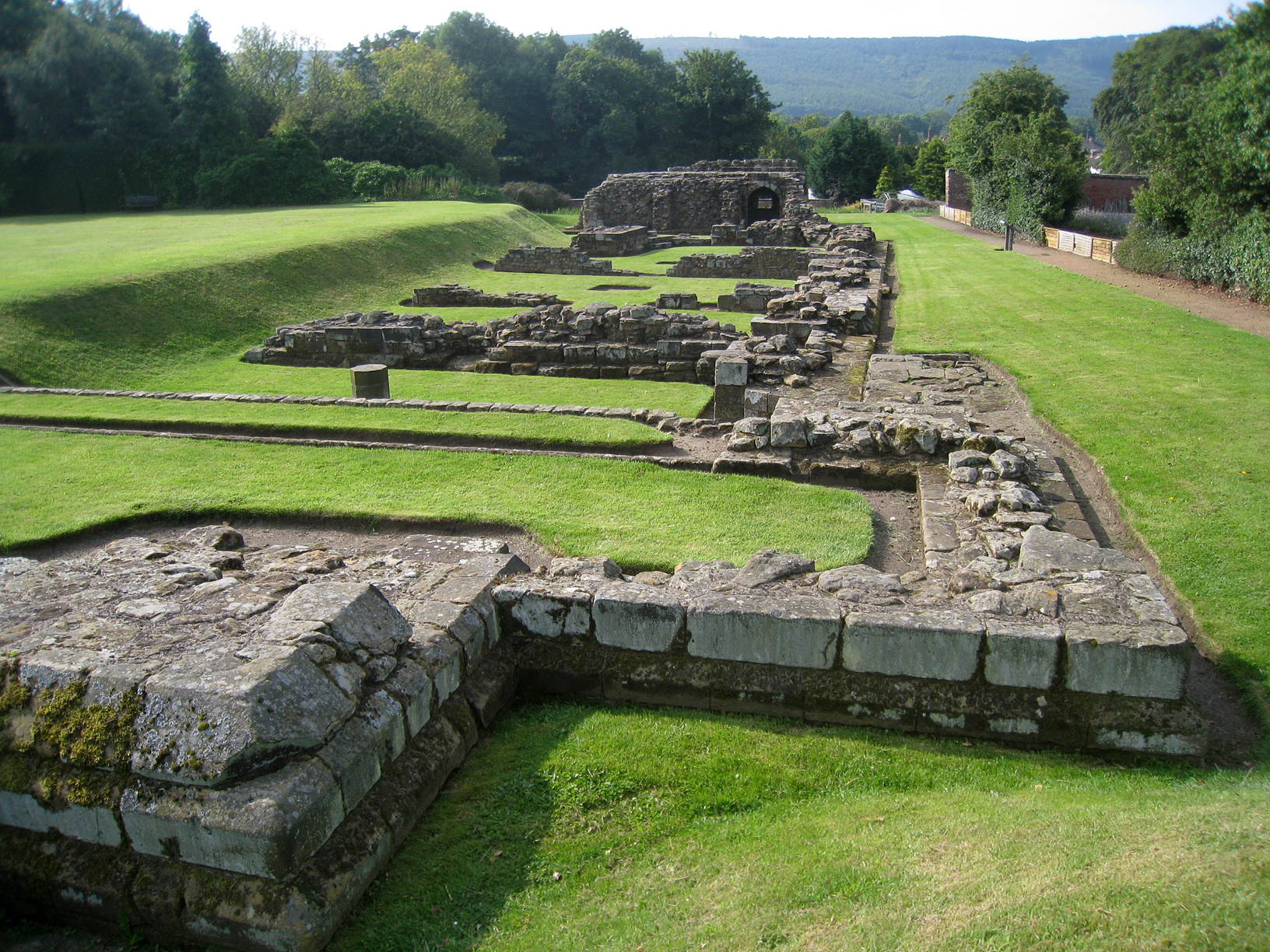
Ruins of the west range with the cellarium visible in the background. The building in the foreground is the outer parlour. The raised ground to the left is the site of the cloister, as yet largely unexcavated.

Fragments of other buildings associated with the priory can be seen on the site. There was a cloister measuring 120 feet (36.5 m) square to the south of the priory church surrounded by domestic buildings or ranges. They replaced an earlier cloister and ranges destroyed in the fire of 1289 rebuilt to a new, larger, design. Processional doors on the cloister's north wall gave access to the nave of the church. In 1854, surviving arches and columns from the cloister were taken to London for display in the Crystal Palace where they provided the basis for a reconstruction of a medieval cloister in the "English National Art Court" section of the exhibition.

Fragments of the west range – the cellarer's range – are extant. It was entered from the west by an outer parlour, projecting from the north end of the range, where members of the community received visitors. The prior lived on the upper floor which comprised a hall, chamber and chapel dedicated to Saint Hilda. The prior's rooms were probably located above the outer parlour, as was the pattern at other monasteries, accessing the cloister and the outside world. The largest surviving fragment of the range comprises a cellarium or storehouse where supplies were kept. It is a vaulted undercroft of nine bays constructed from stone ashlar with its floor level below that of the cloister. It is relatively well-preserved and believed to have been divided by timber partitions which were later replaced in stone.

Most of the refectory (dining hall) range to the south of the cloister and the dorter range to the east, which contained the chapter house and dormitory, have yet to be excavated. Only the western end of the refectory range has been excavated; it presents a vaulted undercroft, three bays of which survive, above which the refectory was located on the first floor. A service passage survives between the kitchen and the refectory. The western part of the undercroft was used as a buttery in the late Middle Ages but would have had severely restricted headroom due to its raised floor.

=== Outer buildings ===
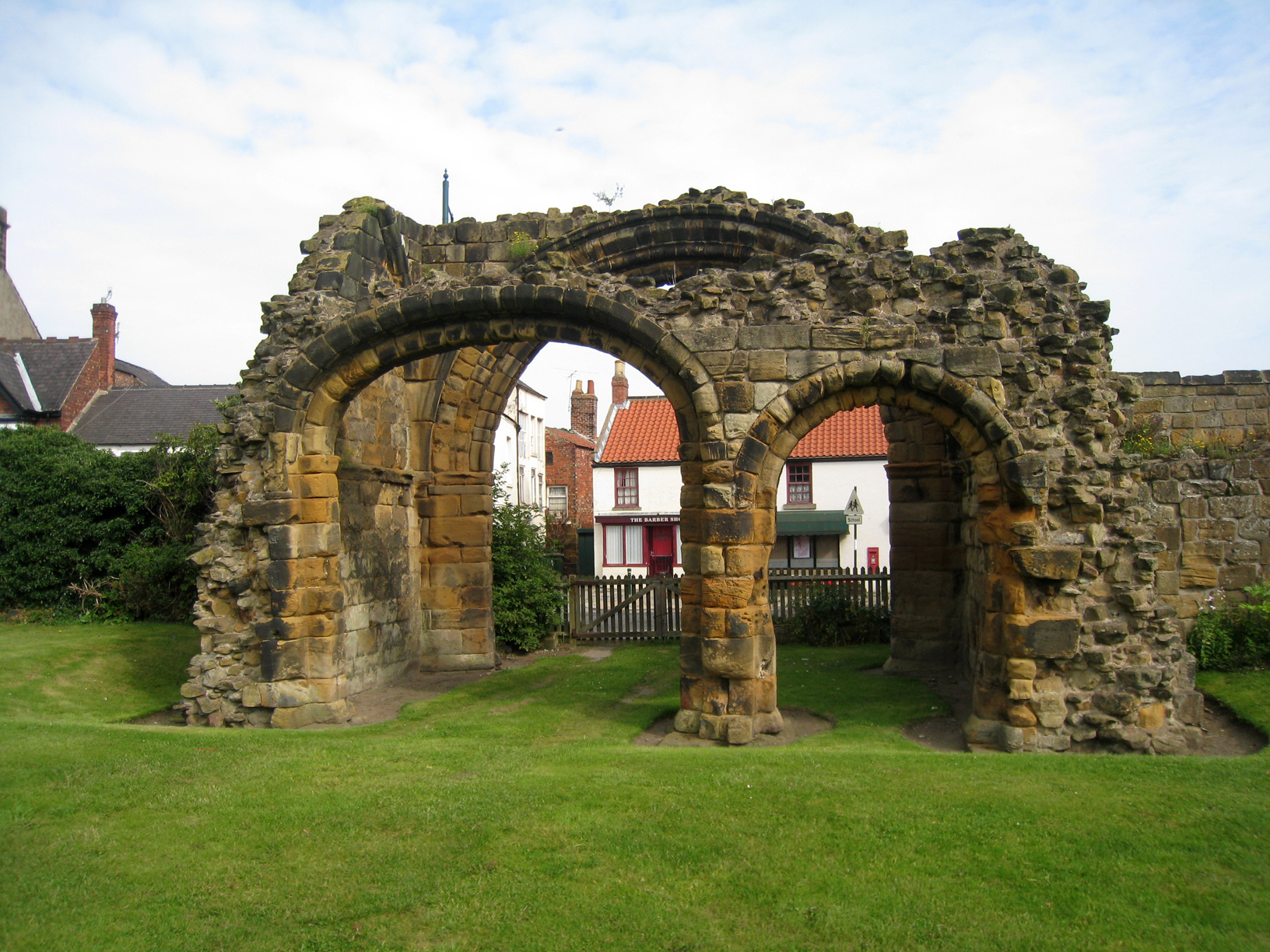
The remains of the outer porch of the great gate of Gisborough Priory

The priory buildings stood at the centre of a walled precinct arranged in two courts, inner and outer with gatehouses at the entrances to both; the remains of the great gate of the inner court are extant but the outer gatehouse no longer survives. The gate comprised an outer porch, an inner gatehall and a porter's lodge on the ground floor with chambers above the arch. It survived intact into the early 18th century but only the outer porch remains. The structure consists of a single large round-headed archway on the outer side with two smaller arches of different sizes, both deeply rebated to accommodate doors, a few metres to the south. The larger arch was for wagons while pedestrians entered through the smaller arch. Little remains of the gatehall or the porter's lodge; the only remnants visible are the stub of its north wall and a latrine shaft.

The canons built an octagonal dovecote a short distance to the west of the west range. The dovecote is extant, though it cannot be visited and is not part of the priory grounds. Built in the 14th century, it was modified in the mid-18th century with the addition of a pyramidal roof tiled with Welsh slate and capped with an open-sided timber cupola. The original nesting boxes have been removed and the dovecote is used as a garden store.

=== Older buildings on the site ===
Gisborough Priory was rebuilt three times; the ruins visible today are principally those of the third rebuild. The site was occupied in Anglo-Saxon times by at least one structure, possibly a timber-framed church or boundary wall, indicated by a number of postholes. It is believed there was a Saxon settlement in the vicinity as late-Saxon potsherds and an 8th-century coin have been found buried under the remains of the priory's west nave. The site was abandoned at some point and by the time the priory was built the land on which it stood was mostly under cultivation. Part of it was used as a graveyard in the early 12th century and an early Norman building was erected in the vicinity, possibly a temporary church.

The Norman priory, completed around 1180, was relatively short and narrow. It was constructed in the Romanesque style with twin aisles either side of the nave and a single tower at the west end, aligned with the main axis of the church. It could be entered from the north, via an external door, and the south via the cloister. The existence of the northward door suggests it was used by a secular congregation, possibly the local nobility and patrons. A number of graves associated with the first priory have been found in the south aisle's floor and against the north wall.

The priory was rebuilt around 1200 on a larger scale with the Romanesque church demolished to its first course of ashlar. The construction of the new church continued through much of the 13th century. The enlarged priory had twin towers at the west end flanking a large double doorway above which was a central rose window; piped water was provided using lead pipes from the cloister, under the church to buildings or standpipes to the north or west of the priory. The main body of the church comprised a nave with two aisles, transepts and a choir. The aisles were laid with geometric coloured tiles adjoining the sandstone columns of the nave. The north aisle was divided into alcoves or private chapels where a number of people – probably local nobles and gentry – were buried. An unusual feature of the church was a well, sunk into the nave, possibly built in an effort to safeguard its water supplies.

The effects of the fire that destroyed the priory in 1289 can be seen in scorched paving between the surviving pillars. It was thought the church had been completely rebuilt, but excavations in the 1980s show that a substantial amount of the less damaged west end was reused which resulted in a distinct inconsistency between the two ends, which were constructed in different architectural styles. Rebuilding was a major task that took several generations and was probably not completed until the end of the 14th century. It is unclear how much of the second priory survived the fire. Where the priory was rebuilt, its builders reused as much as possible; the core of the surviving eastern gable wall is full of fragments from the destroyed second priory.

=== Priory Gardens and Monks' Pond ===
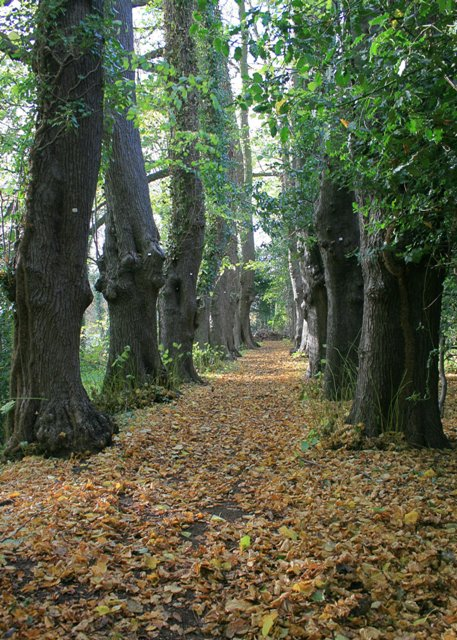
The Monks' Walk in the Gisborough Priory Gardens

Land immediately south of the priory was used by the Chaloners for formal gardens attached to Old Gisborough Hall. In the early 18th century they planted an oval-shaped double avenue of trees, the Monks' Walk, where stonework recovered from mid-19th century excavations was deposited. In between the trees was a manicured lawn used to hold musical and theatrical productions. The Monks' Walk fell into disuse and became overgrown, but it was restored by the Gisborough Priory Project between 2007 and 2009.

In the late 19th century, Margaret Chaloner, wife of the first Lord Gisborough, laid out formal gardens of a typical late-Victorian and Edwardian design with elaborate bedding schemes and gravelled paths. There was a rose garden and a sunken Italian garden with an ornamental pool at its centre. They were open to the public for a small fee and could be entered through a gateway on Bow Street. The gardens are now a popular family run flower farm.

Further east, off the Whitby Road, is the Monks' Pond, the canons' fish pond. It presents a dramatic vista in which the priory arch is reflected and has often been photographed and painted. In 1908, the pond was the scene of an elaborate water tableau organised by Lady Gisborough to raise funds for the restoration of St Nicholas' Church. The pond was home to a number of exceptionally large fish, but pollution in 2000 caused by a sewage leak led to the death of more than 5,000 fish.

=== Other properties owned by the priory ===
The priory was responsible for St Leonard's leper hospital at Hutton Lowcross to the south-west of Guisborough. The hospital was probably founded in the 12th century and became a dependency of the priory in 1275. It was last documented in 1339. Its fate is unclear but it probably survived until the Dissolution in 1540. Archaeological excavations in a field near Hutton Village in the 1960s did not find definite evidence of the leper hospital.

The priory may also have owned a cell at Scarth Wood at Whorlton. A grant issued by Stephen de Meynell in the reign of Henry I records the donation of the hamlet of Scarth to enable the priory to establish a cell for habitation by a single monk or canon. It is unclear whether the cell was built as Scarth is not mentioned in the priory's deeds or in Henry VIII's commissioners' valuation of its property. Fragmentary building remains at Scarth are recorded as existing in the mid-18th century. They were cleared by the start of the 19th century so there is no trace of whatever might once have stood there or indication of what it might have been used for.

== Excavations ==
Captain Thomas Chaloner and William Downing Bruce carried out the first major excavation in 1865–1867 by cutting a trench across the site. A number of features were discovered, including a stone coffin containing the skeleton of a tall man thought to be Robert de Brus, the remnants of a monumental shrine and painted roof bosses. Evidence of the 1289 fire was discovered in the form of pieces of fused metal – an amalgam of lead, silver and iron that had melted and penetrated the floor in the heat of the fire. The Office of Works carried out excavations in 1932 in conjunction with work to consolidate the walls and grounds so they could be opened to the public. Further work was carried out by Roy Gilyard Beer between 1947–54 for the Ministry of Works, which exposed more of the site and cleared material from the 19th century.

In 1985–86 Cleveland County Council's Archaeology Section carried out a major excavation of the west end of the nave to consolidate an area of subsidence. Its cause was the collapse of an unrecorded burial vault. The excavations found more evidence of the fire of 1289 including scorched masonry, a shattered bell and broken grave-slabs. The remains of 47 people – 21 men, 17 women, 6 children and 3 of undetermined gender – were discovered, some of whom had been buried with grave goods including a gold finger ring and jet crosses. Two chalices and patens were found alongside the remains of two priests. The skeletons were cremated and the ashes scattered in the Monks' Walk in the Priory Gardens. A geophysical survey carried out to the west and east of the west range indicated the existence of the remains of other monastic buildings which have yet to be excavated.

== Priors ==
Between its establishment and its dissolution, 24 priors were recorded as holding office at Gisborough Priory. Their names and dates of taking office or periods when they held office, where known, were as follows:

- William de Brus (1119–45?)
- Cuthbert (1146–54)
- Ralph (1174?–80)
- Roald (1199–?)
- Lawrence (1211–12)
- Michael (1218–34)
- John (1239–51, 1257)
- Simon (date uncertain)
- Ralph de Irton (1262)
- Adam de Newland (1280)
- William de Middleburgh (1281)
- Robert de Wilton (1320–1)
- John de Darlington (1346)
- John de Horeworth or Hurworth (1364–93)
- Walter de Thorp (1393)
- John de Helmesley (1408)
- John Thweng (1425)
- Richard Ayreton (1437)
- Richard de Hoton (1452)
- Thomas Darlington (1455)
- John Moreby (1475)
- John Whitby (1491–1505)
- John Moreby (1505)
- William Spires (1511)
- James Cockerill (1519–1534?)
- Robert Pursglove (1537, 1539)

== Other burials ==
- William Neville, 1st Earl of Kent
- John Lumley, 4th Baron Lumley
- William de Brus, 3rd Lord of Annandale
- Robert de Brus, 4th Lord of Annandale
- Isabella of Gloucester and Hertford
- Robert de Brus, 5th Lord of Annandale
- William Latimer, 4th Baron Latimer
