= Robert de Brus, 2nd Lord of Annandale =

Anglo-Norman nobleman

Robert II de Brus
- Coat of arms as Lord of Annandale: Or, a saltire and a chief Gules
- Died: c. 1194
- Buried: Gisborough Priory, Guisborough, Yorkshire
- Noble family: Bruce
- Spouse: Euphemia
- Issue: Robert III de Brus; William de Brus, 3rd Lord of Annandale; Bernard de Brus
- Father: Robert de Brus, 1st Lord of Annandale
- Mother: Agnes

Robert II de Brus, le Meschin (the Cadet) (fl. 1138, died c. 1194) was a 12th-century Norman noble and 2nd Lord of Annandale. He was the son, perhaps the second son, of Robert de Brus, 1st Lord of Annandale, and wife Agnes.

== Life ==
The elder de Brus' allegiances were compromised when David I invaded England in the later 1130s, and he had renounced his fealty to David before the Battle of the Standard in 1138. The younger Robert however remained loyal and took over his father's land in Scotland, whilst the English territories remained with the elder Robert and passed to the latter's elder son Adam de Brus, 2nd Lord of Skelton. Bruce family tradition has it that Robert II was captured by his father at the battle and given over to King Stephen of England.

A legend tells that in the 1140s, Robert II was visited at Annan by St Malachy. St Malachy asked Robert to pardon a thief, but Robert hanged him anyway, and for this the River Annan destroyed part of his castle and the de Brus line received a curse from the holy man. Robert made Lochmaben the centre of his lordship and constructed a new caput there.

He married Euphemia, possibly the daughter of Sir Adam de Crosebi or Crosbj of Albemarle (b. ca. 1098). They had three known children:

- Robert (d. ca. 1191), eldest son.
- William (d. 1212).
- Bernard.

Robert was buried at Gisborough Priory in the North Riding, Yorkshire, England, a monastery founded by his father Robert I de Brus. As his eldest son, Robert, predeceased him, he was succeeded by his second son William.

== Robert III de Brus ==
Robert III de Brus (fl. 12th century, died ca. 1191) was the oldest son of Robert de Brus, 2nd Lord of Annandale.

He predeceased his father, and so did not inherit the lordship of Annandale, which passed to his brother, William de Brus, 3rd Lord of Annandale. He married in 1183 Isabella Mac William (Isibéal inghean Uilleim), illegitimate daughter of King William I of Scotland through the latter's liaison with a daughter of Robert Avenel lord of Eskdale. There were no children.

== Footnotes ==
Baronage of Scotland
Robert de Brus, 2nd Lord of Annandale House of Bruce
Preceded by Robert I de Brus	Lord of Annandale; 1138x - 1194	Succeeded by William de Brus
