= William de Brus (fl. 1294) =

13th-14th century English noble

William de Brus (fl. 1294), was an Anglo-Scottish knight. He was a younger son of Robert de Brus, 5th Lord of Annandale and Isabella de Clare.

He held the manor of Caldecote in mesne lordship and a fee of Great Catworth, both in Huntingdonshire, whom he held them of his father. William was summoned to provide military service in Scotland in 1295.

He is said to have married Elizabeth, daughter of Raymond de Sully. They did not have any issue. Elizabeth married secondly William de Braose.
