= Robert de Brus, 1st Lord of Annandale =

Anglo-Norman baron and knight (c. 1078–1141)

Robert I de Brus
- 1st Lord of Annandale and 1st Lord of Skelton
- Coat of arms as Lord of Annandale: Or, a saltire and a chief Gules
- Predecessor: None
- Successor: Robert de Brus, 2nd Lord of Annandale
- Born: c. 1078; France
- Died: 11 May 1141; Skelton Castle, Yorkshire, England
- Noble family: Bruce
- Spouse: Agnes de Pagnall - Agnes de Bainard
- Issue: Adam de Brus, 2nd Lord of Skelton; Robert de Brus, 2nd Lord of Annandale; Agatha de Brus; Hugh de Brus (uncertain); Peter de Brus (uncertain)

Robert I de Brus, 1st Lord of Annandale and 1st Lord of Skelton (c. 1078–1141), was an early 12th-century Anglo-Norman lord and the first of the Bruce dynasty to hold lands in Scotland. A monastic patron, he is remembered as the founder of Gisborough Priory in Yorkshire, England, in present-day Redcar and Cleveland, in 1119.

== Biography ==
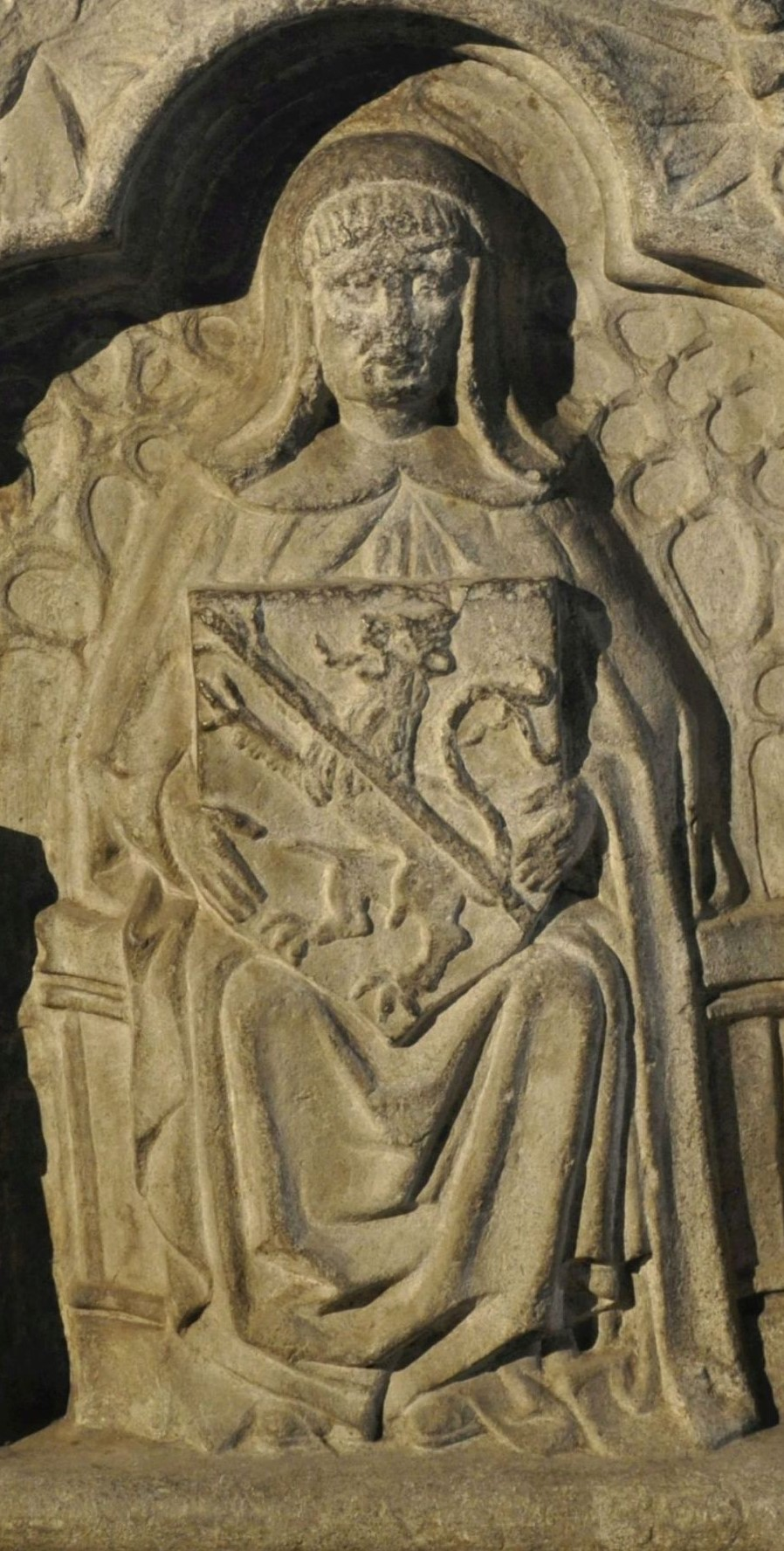
William de Brus, brother of Robert I, engraving out of stone, Yorkshire, England

Robert is given conflicting parentage by antiquarians. When Robert I died, his first son Adam gave churches founded by an Adam de Bruis in the fief of Brix, Normandy, to the abbey of Saint Saviour le Vicomte. (Robert II, Robert I's second son, acted as a witness for this donation). This grant was later confirmed by a Peter, son of William the Forester de Bruis. William is assumed to be Robert I's younger brother, making Peter the nephew of Robert, with all of them claiming Adam, 2nd Lord of Skelton, as their kinsman and overlord.

Cokayne states that the family name is derived from the placename Bruis, now Brix, Manche, in the arrondissement of Valognes in the Cotentin Peninsula, Normandy. The family came to England after King Henry I of England's campaign in Normandy.

What is known clearly is that this Robert de Brus is first mentioned during the period between 1094 and 1100, as a witness to a charter of Hugh, Earl of Chester, granting the church of Flamborough, Yorkshire, to Whitby Abbey. Possibly the Earl of Chester in about 1100–1104 enfeoffed Robert of certain portions of his Cleveland fee in Lofthouse, Upleatham, Barwick, Ingleby, and other places.

Between 1103 and 1106, Robert de Brus attested with Ralph de Paynel and 16 others a charter of William, Count of Mortain, to the abbey of Marmoutier. In 1109 at a council of all England held at Nottingham, he attested the charter of King Henry I confirming to the church of Durham certain possessions which the men of Northumberland had claimed. From 1109 to 1114, he appears in early charters in possession of numerous other manors and lands in Yorkshire, and in the same period he attested a charter of Henry I issued at Woodstock, Oxfordshire. He appears in the Lindsey Survey made 1115–1118 in possession of even further lands. There is a strong presumption that the king had given Robert his Yorkshire fee soon after the Battle of Tinchebray was fought on 28 September 1106.

Robert was present at the great gathering of northern magnates at Durham in 1121, and sometime during the period 1124–1130 he was with the king at Brampton. About 1131 he was in the retinue of Henry I at Lions, in Eure. At about the same time he attested with three of his personal knights a confirmation with Alan de Percy to the monks of Whitby.

It is said that Robert had been given some 80 manors in Yorkshire by King Henry. It is evident that Robert kept up his connections with other Normans, too. A member of the Feugères family, of Feugères, Calvados, arr. Bayeux, canton of Isigny, witnessed charters of this Robert de Brus circa 1135 in Yorkshire.

=== Scotland ===
The friendship between Robert de Brus and David FitzMalcolm (after 1124 King David I of Scotland), who was present in France with King Henry and was granted much of the Cotentin Peninsula, may have commenced at least as early as 1120, at Henry's Court. When David became king, he settled upon his military companion and friend the Lordship of Annandale, in 1124, though there is scant evidence that this Robert ever took up residence on his Scottish estates.

After the death of King Henry, David refused to recognise Henry's successor, King Stephen. Instead, David supported the claim of his niece and Stephen's cousin, Empress Matilda, to the English throne and taking advantage of the chaos in England due to the disputed succession there, he took the chance to realise his son's claim to Northumberland. Robert de Brus of Annandale could not countenance these actions and as a result he and King David parted company, with Robert bitterly renouncing his homage to David before taking the English side at the Battle of the Standard in 1138.

Before the battle, Robert had made an impassioned plea to David, calling to his remembrance how he and other Normans had by their influence in Scotland, as far back as 1107, obliged King Alexander to give a part of the Scottish Kingdom to his brother David. The appeal was in vain. Robert and his eldest son Adam joined the English army, while his younger son, Robert II, with an eye on his Scottish inheritance, fought for David.

== Marriage ==
Robert de Brus, 1st Lord of Annandale, married a woman named Agnes. She has been identified in various old sources as either Agnes de Pagnall, daughter of Foulques de Pagnall (Fulk de Paynel) of Carleton, North Yorkshire, or Agnes de Bainard, daughter of Geoffrey de Bainard, Sheriff of York. It has also been reported that he married twice to both of the above women. More modern research has revealed that both of these wives are unsubstantiated. Evidence from charters involving Robert de Brus indicates that his wife Agnes was an heiress of the Surdeval family. Her exact parentage is not known, she may have been an unrecorded daughter of Richard de Sourdeval, who held many manors in the Yorkshire region. Alternatively, she may have been a daughter of either Richard's son Robert, or his daughter Matilda Maude de Sourdeval who married Ralph (Radulf) Paynel, Sheriff of Yorkshire.

Robert and Agnes had the following children:

- Adam I de Brus, eldest son and heir upon whom devolved, under feudal law, all the English estates. He only survived his father by 22 months, and married Joanna de Meschines. (Note: Adam is sometimes listed as the first husband of Agnes d'Aumale who later married William de Roumare, the son of an Earl of Lincoln, but a manuscript history names Peter de Brus (an otherwise attested unspecified relative who may be another son or a much younger brother of the 1st Lord of Annandale) as Agnes's husband instead. He is specifically listed as her second husband after de Roumare, who died in 1151. A marriage between Adam and Agnes is only plausible under an assumption that the source is confused on both Adam's name and the timing of the marriage.) He had a son also named Adam, whose recorded male line ended with Peter III de Brus in 1272, but whose daughter Isabel married Henry de Percy, son of Joscelin of Louvain, and became the ancestress of all the Percy Earls and Dukes of Northumberland.
- Robert II de Brus, the younger son, upon whom his father had settled the Scottish Lordship of Annandale, plus several wheat-producing ploughlands at Skelton, Yorkshire, during his lifetime. Robert II was the eventual ancestor of Robert the Bruce and all subsequent monarchs of Scotland.
- Agatha de Brus, married Ralph FitzRibald of Middleham.

== Death ==
In 1119, Robert de Brus founded the Augustinian monastery of Gisborough Priory and installed his younger brother William de Brus as the first Prior there. The priory would be used as a family mausoleum for generations of the Brus family.

Robert I de Brus died on 11 May 1141 at Skelton Castle in Yorkshire, England. As the founder of Gisborough Priory, he was buried inside the church, in the place of honour between the Canon's stalls in the Quire. Priory histories record his death and his burial there. He was survived by his wife Agnes, and his children. Robert's son, Adam de Brus, Second Lord of Skelton, was buried there in 1143, and his son Robert, Second Lord of Annandale, was buried there in 1194. Both the Scottish and English sides of the family were laid to rest there, the last being Robert de Brus, Fifth Lord of Annandale, in 1295. Eventually a great cenotaph was placed there honoring the Brus family and commemorating its most famous descendant, King Robert Bruce (Brus) of Scotland.

== Footnotes ==
Baronage of Scotland
Robert de Brus, 1st Lord of Annandale House of Bruce Born: c. 1070 Died: 1142
Preceded by New Creation	Lord of Annandale; 1113 x 1124–1138	Succeeded by Robert II de Brus
