= William de Brus, 3rd Lord of Annandale =

Scottish noble (died 1212)

William de Brus
- 3rd Lord of Annandale
- Coat of arms as Lord of Annandale: Or, a saltire and a chief Gules
- Predecessor: Robert de Brus, 2nd Lord of Annandale
- Successor: Robert de Brus, 4th Lord of Annandale
- Died: 16 July 1212
- Noble family: Bruce
- Spouse: Christina mac Uhtred
- Issue: Robert de Brus, 4th Lord of Annandale; John de Brus; William de Brus
- Father: Robert de Brus, 2nd Lord of Annandale
- Mother: Euphemia

William de Brus, 3rd Lord of Annandale (15 July 1199 - 16 July 1212), was the second but eldest surviving son of Robert de Brus, 2nd Lord of Annandale, and Euphemia.

== Life ==
His elder brother, Robert III de Brus, predeceased their father, never holding the lordship of Annandale. William de Brus thus succeeded his father when the latter died in 1194.

William de Brus possessed large estates in the north of England. He obtained from John, King of England, the grant of a weekly market at Hartlepool, and granted lands to the canons of Gisburn. Very little else is known about William's activities. He makes a few appearances in the English government records and witnessed a charter of William the Lion, King of Scotland.

== Christina mac Uhtred ==
Christina of Galloway (fl. late 12th century) or Christina mac Uhtred was a Scottish noblewoman and member of the ruling dynasty of Galloway, who married William. Christina was the daughter of Uhtred of Galloway, who co-ruled the semi-independent Lordship of Galloway from 1161 until his death in 1174. Uhtred, son of Fergus of Galloway, belonged to a dynastically powerful family within the Norse-Gaelic border regions of Scotland. Her mother was Gunhilda of Dunbar.

As a daughter of the Galloway ruling family and spouse of the Annandale Bruce line, Christina served as a bridge between Norse-Gaelic Galloway and the rising Bruce dynasty.

After William's death, she remarried, as his second wife, Patrick I, Earl of Dunbar.

== Family ==
William de Brus and Christina mac Uhtred had three sons together:

- Robert de Brus, Lord of Annandale (died 1226), married Isobel of Huntingdon, had issue; his grandson became Robert the Bruce, King of Scotland.
- John de Brus
- William de Brus

Through their son Robert, their lineage directly contributed to the Wars of Scottish Independence and the royal claim of Robert I of Scotland.

== Death ==
William de Brus died on 16 July 1212.

== Sources ==
- Blakely, Ruth Margaret (2005). The Brus Family in England and Scotland, 1100-1295. The Boydell Press. ISBN 1-84383-152-X.
- Burke, Messrs., John and John Bernard, The Royal Families of England, Scotland, and Wales, with Their Descendants, &c., London, 1848: vol. 1, pedigree XXXIV.
- Northcliffe, Charles B., of Langon, MA., editor, The Visitation of Yorkshire, 1563/4 by William Flower, Norroy King of Arms, London, 1881, p. 40.
- Duncan, A. A. M., ‘Brus, Robert (II) de, lord of Annandale (d. 1194?)’, in Oxford Dictionary of National Biography, Oxford University Press, 2004
- Paul, James Balfour (1905). The Scots Peerage : founded on Wood's edition of Sir Robert Douglas's Peerage of Scotland; containing an historical and genealogical account of the nobility of that kingdom. Vol. 2. Edinburgh: David Douglas.

Baronage of Scotland
Preceded by Robert II de Brus	Lord of Annandale; 1194–1212	Succeeded by Robert IV de Brus
