= Isabella of Gloucester and Hertford =

English noble

- Lady of Annandale and Ireby
- Born: 2 November 1226
- Died: 10 July 1264 (aged 37)
- Noble family: de Clare
- Spouse: Robert de Brus, 5th Lord of Annandale
- Issue: Robert VI the Bruce, Earl of Carrick; Lady Isabella FitzMarmaduke; Lady Constance Scot de Calverley; Richard Bruce; Sir Bernard Bruce; William Bruce
- Father: Gilbert de Clare, 4th Earl of Hertford
- Mother: Isabel Marshal

Isabella de Clare (2 November 1226 – 10 July 1264) was the daughter of Gilbert de Clare, 4th Earl of Hertford and 5th Earl of Gloucester and Isabel Marshal. She is also known as Isabel de Clare, but this is however, the name of many women in her family.

== Family ==
Isabella's maternal grandparents were William Marshal, 1st Earl of Pembroke, and his wife Isabel de Clare, 4th Countess of Pembroke. Her paternal grandparents were Richard de Clare, 3rd Earl of Hertford, and Amice FitzRobert.

Isabella was the fourth of six children. Her brother was Richard de Clare, 6th Earl of Hertford. Her sister, Amice de Clare, married Baldwin de Redvers, 6th Earl of Devon, and was the mother of Baldwin de Redvers, 7th Earl of Devon, and Isabella de Fortibus, Countess of Devon.

== Marriage ==
Isabella was married on 12 May 1240 (at age thirteen and a half) to Robert de Brus, 5th Lord of Annandale. Isabella brought to him the village of Ripe, in Sussex. Her husband was a candidate to become King of Scotland, after the death of the young Margaret, Maid of Norway. Her husband did not, however, succeed; Robert's rival, John Balliol, was elected King of Scotland in 1292.

Robert and Isabella had up to six children:

1. Robert (1243–1304)
2. William, married Elizabeth de Sully, without issue
3. Bernard
4. Richard (died before 26 January 1287)
5. Isabella (1249 – c. 1284), married (as his first wife) Sir John Fitz Marmaduke, Isabel was buried at Easington, county Durham.

John Balliol's time as King of Scotland did not last long, he died in 1314. Isabella's grandson, Robert the Bruce became King of Scotland. Isabella did not however get to see this day, she died in 1264, aged thirty seven. Her husband married a second time, to Christina de Ireby, this marriage produced no children.

Despite claims to the contrary by amateur genealogists, there is no evidence that Isabella had other children.

== Ancestors ==
Ancestors of Isabella of Gloucester and Hertford

16. Richard Fitz Gilbert de Clare
Roger de Clare, 2nd Earl of Hertford
17. Alice de Gernon
Richard de Clare, 3rd Earl of Hertford
18. James de St Hilary
Maud de St. Hilary
19. Aveline
Gilbert de Clare, 4th Earl of Hertford
20. Robert, 1st Earl of Gloucester
William Fitz Robert, 2nd Earl of Gloucester
21. Mabel FitzHamon
Amice FitzRobert
22. Robert de Beaumont, 2nd Earl of Leicester
Hawise de Beaumont
23. Amice de Montfort
Isabella de Clare
24. Gilbert Marshal
John Marshal
25. Margaret
William Marshal, 1st Earl of Pembroke
26. Walter de Salisbury
Sybilla of Salisbury
27. Sybyl de Chaources
Isabel Marshal
28. Gilbert de Clare, 1st Earl of Pembroke
Richard de Clare, 2nd Earl of Pembroke
29. Isabel de Beaumont
Isabel de Clare, 4th Countess of Pembroke
30. Dermot MacMurrough
15. Eva MacMurrough
31. Mor Ui Thuathail
