= Scottish Westminster constituencies 1955 to 1974 =

Overview
1708 to 1832
1832 to 1868
1868 to 1885
1885 to 1918
1918 to 1950
1950 to 1955
1955 to 1974
1974 to 1983
1983 to 1997
1997 to 2005
2005 to 2024
since 2024

The results of the First Periodical Report of the Boundary Commission for Scotland became effective for the 1955 general election of the House of Commons of the Parliament of the United Kingdom (Westminster). The review defined 32 burgh constituencies (BCs) and 39 county constituencies (CCs), with each electing one Member of Parliament (MP) by the first-past-the-post system of election. Therefore, Scotland had 71 parliamentary seats.

Scottish Westminster constituencies, 1955–1974.

Each constituency was entirely within a county or a grouping of two or three counties, or was if the cities of Aberdeen, Dundee, Edinburgh and Glasgow are regarded as belonging, respectively to the county of Aberdeen, the county of Angus, the county of Midlothian and the county of Lanark.

The constituencies of Dunfermline Burghs and Kirkcaldy Burghs were the final two non-coterminous burgh constituencies in the House of Commons.

There were changes to the boundaries of nine Scottish constituencies for the 1964 general election but, throughout the 1955 to 1974 period, there was no change to county groupings, to the total numbers of constituencies and MPs, or to constituency names.

The results of the Second Periodical Review and a subsequent interim review were implemented for the February 1974 general election.

County or counties	Constituency or constituencies	Contents of constituency
Aberdeen including city of Aberdeen	Aberdeen North BC	Cairncry, St Andrew's, St Clement's, St Machar, St Nicholas, and Woodside wards of city Minor alteration to overall boundary of 1950 to 1955
Aberdeen including city of Aberdeen	Aberdeen South BC	Ferryhill, Holburn, Rosemount, Rubislaw, Ruthrieston, and Torry wards of city Minor alteration to overall boundary of 1950 to 1955
Aberdeen including city of Aberdeen	East Aberdeenshire CC	Deer, Ellon, and Turriff districts of county Burghs of Ellon, Fraserburgh, Peterhead, Rosehearty, and Turriff
Aberdeen including city of Aberdeen	West Aberdeenshire CC	Aberdeen, Alford, Deeside, Garioch and Huntly districts of county Burghs of Ballater, Huntly, Inverurie, Kintore, and Oldmeldrum
Angus, including city of Dundee, and Kincardine	Dundee East BC	First, Fourth, Fifth, Tenth, Eleventh, and Twelfth wards of city Overall boundary as 1950 to 1955
Angus, including city of Dundee, and Kincardine	Dundee West BC	Second, Third, Sixth, Seventh, Eighth, and Ninth wards of city Overall boundary as 1950 to 1955
Angus, including city of Dundee, and Kincardine	North Angus and Mearns CC	County of Kincardine; Brechin and Montrose districts of county of Angus; Burghs of Brechin and Montrose in county of Angus; Overall boundary as 1950 to 1955
Angus, including city of Dundee, and Kincardine	South Angus CC	Carnoustie, Forfar, Kirriemuir, and Monifieth districts of county of Angus; Burghs of Arbroath, Carnoustie, Forfar, Kirriemuir, and Monifieth in county of Angus; Overall boundary as 1950 to 1955
Argyll	Argyll CC	County of Argyll; Overall boundary as 1918 to 1955
Ayr and Bute	Ayr CC	Part of Ayr district Burghs of Ayr and Prestwick in county of Ayr; Overall boundary as 1950 to 1955
Ayr and Bute	Bute and North Ayrshire CC	County of Bute; Salcoats district of county of Ayr; Burghs of Ardrossan, Largs, Saltcoats and Stevenston in county of Ayr; Minor alteration to overall boundary of 1950 to 1955
Ayr and Bute	Central Ayrshire CC	Irvine and Kilwinning districts and part of Ayr and part of Kilmarnock districts of county of Ayr; Burghs of Irvine, Kilwinning, Stewarton, and Troon in county of Ayr; Minor alteration to overall boundary of 1950 to 1955
Ayr and Bute	Kilmarnock CC	Newmilns district and part of Kilmarnock district of county of Ayr; Burghs of Darvel, Galston, Kilmarnock, and Newmilns and Greenholm in county of Ayr; Overall boundary as 1950 to 1955
Ayr and Bute	South Ayrshire CC	Cumnock, Dalmellington, Girvan, and Maybole districts of county of Ayr; Burghs of Cumnock and Holmhead, Girvan, and Maybole in county of Ayr; Overall boundary as 1950 to 1955
Banff	Banffshire CC	County of Banff; Overall boundary as 1918 to 1950
Berwick and East Lothian	Berwick and East Lothian CC	Counties of Berwick and East Lothian; Overall boundary as Berwick and Haddington CC 1918 to 1950 and Berwick and East Lothian 1950 to 1955
Caithness and Sutherland	Caithness and Sutherland CC	Counties of Caithness and Sutherland; Overall boundary as 1918 to 1955
Dumfries	Dumfriesshire CC	County of Dumfries; Overall boundary as 1950 to 1955
Dunbarton	East Dunbartonshire CC	Cumbernauld, Kirkintilloch, and New Kilpatrick districts Burghs of Clydebank, Kirkintilloch, and Milngavie; Overall boundary as 1951 to 1955
Dunbarton	West Dunbartonshire CC	Helensburgh, Old Kilpatrick, and Vale of Leven districts Burghs of Cove and Kilcreggan, Dumbarton, and Helensburgh; Overall boundary as 1951 to 1955
Fife	Dunfermline Burghs BC	1955: Burghs of Cowdenbeath, Dunfermline, Inverkeithing, and Lochgelly; Overall boundary as 1950 to 1955; 1964: Description as 1955 but burgh of Dumfermline altered
Fife	Kirkcaldy Burghs BC	Burghs of Buckhaven and Methil, Burntisland, Kinghorn, and Kirkcaldy; Minor alteration to overall boundary of 1951 to 1955
Fife	East Fife CC	Anstruther, Cupar, and St Andrews districts and part of Wemyss district Burghs of Auchtermuchty, Crail, Elie and Earlsferry, Falkland, Kilrenny and Anstruther Easter and Anstruther Wester, Ladybank, Leven, Newburgh, Newport, Pittenweem, St Andrews, St Monance, and Tayport; Overall boundary as 1950 to 1955
Fife	West Fife CC	1955: Dunfermline, Kirkcaldy, and Lochgelly districts and part of Wemyss district Burghs of Culross, Leslie, and Markinch; Minor alteration to overall boundary of 1951 to 1955; 1964: Description as 1955 but Kirkcaldy district altered
Inverness and Ross and Cromarty	Inverness CC	County of Inverness except Outer Hebridean districts (Barra, Harris, North Uist, and South Uist); Overall boundary as 1918 to 1955
Inverness and Ross and Cromarty	Ross and Cromarty CC	County of Ross and Cromarty except Outer Hebridean district (Lewis) and burgh (Stornoway); Overall boundary as 1918 to 1955
Inverness and Ross and Cromarty	Western Isles CC	Outer Hebridean districts (Barra, Harris, North Uist, and South Uist) of the county of Inverness; Outer Hebridean district (Harris) of the county of Ross and Cromarty; Outer Hebridean burgh of Stornoway in the county of Ross and Cromarty; Overall boundary as 1918 to 1955
Kirkcudbright and Wigtown	Galloway	Counties of Kirkcudbright and Wigtown; Overall boundary as 1950 to 1955
Lanark, including city of Glasgow	Coatbridge and Airdrie BC	Burghs of Coatbridge and Airdrie; Minor alteration to overall boundary of 1950 to 1955
Lanark, including city of Glasgow	Glasgow Bridgeton BC	Calton and Dalmarnock wards and part of Mile-End ward of city
Lanark, including city of Glasgow	Glasgow Cathcart BC	Cathcart and Langside wards and part of Govanhill ward of city Overall boundary as 1950 to 1955
Lanark, including city of Glasgow	Glasgow Central BC	Cowcaddens and Townhead wards and part of Exchange ward of city
Lanark, including city of Glasgow	Glasgow Craigton BC	Craigton ward and part of Fairfield and part of Pollokshields wards of city
Lanark, including city of Glasgow	Glasgow Gorbals BC	Gorbals and Hutchesontown wards and part of Govanhill and part of Kingston wards of city
Lanark, including city of Glasgow	Glasgow Govan BC	Govan and Kinning park wards and part of Fairfield and part of Kingston wards of city
Lanark, including city of Glasgow	Glasgow Hillhead BC	Kelvinside and Partick West wards and part of Whiteinch ward of city
Lanark, including city of Glasgow	Glasgow Kelvingrove BC	Anderston and Park wards and part of Exchange ward of city
Lanark, including city of Glasgow	Glasgow Maryhill BC	Maryhill and Ruchill wards of city Overall boundary as 1950 to 1955
Lanark, including city of Glasgow	Glasgow Pollok BC	Camphill and Pollokshaws wards and part of Pollokshields ward of city
Lanark, including city of Glasgow	Glasgow Provan BC	Dennistoun and Provan wards of city
Lanark, including city of Glasgow	Glasgow Scotstoun BC	Knightswood and Yoker wards and part of Whiteinch ward of city
Lanark, including city of Glasgow	Glasgow Shettleston BC	Parkhead, and Shettleston and Tollcross wards and part of Mile-End ward of city Overall boundary as 1950 to 1955
Lanark, including city of Glasgow	Glasgow Springburn BC	Cowlairs and Springburn wards of city
Lanark, including city of Glasgow	Glasgow Woodside BC	North Kelvin, Partick East, and Woodside wards of city
Lanark, including city of Glasgow	Bothwell CC	Sixth district and part of Ninth district Minor alteration to overall boundary of 1950 to 1955
Lanark, including city of Glasgow	Hamilton CC	Part of Fourth and part of Fifth districts Overall boundary as 1950 to 1955
Lanark, including city of Glasgow	Lanark CC	First, Second, and Third districts and part of Fourth and part of Fifth districts Burghs of Biggar and Lanark; Overall boundary as 1918 to 1955
Lanark, including city of Glasgow	Motherwell CC	Part of Seventh district Burgh of Motherwell and Wishaw, Lanarkshire; Minor alteration to overall boundary of 1950 to 1955
Lanark, including city of Glasgow	North Lanarkshire CC	Part of Seventh and part of Ninth districts Minor alteration to overall boundary of 1950 to 1955
Lanark, including city of Glasgow	Rutherglen CC	Eighth district Burgh of Rutherglen; Overall boundary as 1950 to 1955
Midlothian, including city of Edinburgh	Edinburgh Central BC	George Square, Holyroood, St Giles wards and part of Gorgie-Dalry ward of city
Midlothian, including city of Edinburgh	Edinburgh East BC	1955: Craigentinny, Craigmillar, and Portobello wards of city Burgh of Musselburgh; Minor alteration to overall boundary of 1950 to 1955; 1964: Description as 1955 but burgh of Musselburgh altered
Midlothian, including city of Edinburgh	Edinburgh Leith BC	Central Leith, South Leith, and West Leith wards of city
Midlothian, including city of Edinburgh	Edinburgh North BC	Broughton, Calton, and St Andrew's wards of city Overall boundary as 1950 to 1955
Midlothian, including city of Edinburgh	Edinburgh Pentlands BC	1955: Collinton, Merchiston, and Sighthill wards and part of Gorgie-Dalry ward of city 1964: Description as 1955 but Sighthill ward altered
Midlothian, including city of Edinburgh	Edinburgh South BC	1955: Liberton, Morningside, and Newington wards of city Overall boundary as 1950 to 1955; 1964: Description as 1955 but Liberton ward altered
Midlothian, including city of Edinburgh	Edinburgh West BC	1955: Corstorphine, Murrayfield-Cramond, and Pilton wards and part of St Bernard's ward of city 1964: Description as 1955 but Corstorphine ward altered
Midlothian, including city of Edinburgh	Midlothian CC	1955: County of Midlothian except city of Edinburgh and burgh of Musselburgh; 1964: County of Midlothian except city of Edinburgh and altered burgh of Musselburgh
Moray and Nairn	Moray and Nairn CC	Counties of Moray and Nairn; Overall boundary as 1918 to 1955
Orkney and Shetland	Orkney and Zetland CC	Counties of Orkney and Shetland; Overall boundary as 1918 to 1955
Peebles, Roxburgh and Selkirk	Roxburgh, Selkirk and Peebles CC	Counties of Peebles, Roxburgh, and Selkirk
Perth and Kinross	Kinross and West Perthshire CC	County of Kinross; Central, Highland, and Western districts of county of Perth; Burghs of Aberfeldy, Auchterarder, Callander, Crieff, Doune, Dunblane, and Pitlochry in county of Perth; Overall boundary as Kinross and Western Perthshire 1918 to 1950 and Perth and West Perthshire 1950 to 1955
Perth and Kinross	Perth and East Perthshire CC	Eastern and Perth districts of county of Perth; Burghs of Abernethy, Alyth, Blairgowrie and Rattray, Coupar Angus, and Perth; Overall boundary as Perth 1918 to 1950 and Perth and East Perthshire 1950 to 1955
Renfrew	Greenock BC	1955: Burgh of Greenock; 1964: Altered burgh of Greenock
Renfrew	Paisley BC	Burgh of Paisley; Overall boundary as 1950 to 1955
Renfrew	East Renfrewshire CC	First and Second districts Burghs of Barrhead and Renfrew; Overall boundary as 1951 to 1955
Renfrew	West Renfrewshire CC	1955: Third, Fourth, and Fifth districts Burghs of Gourock and Johnstone; 1964: Description as 1955 but Fifth district altered
Stirling and Clackmannan	Stirling and Falkirk Burghs	Burghs of Falkirk, Grangemouth, and Stirling in county of Stirling; Minor alteration to overall boundary of 1950 to 1955
Stirling and Clackmannan	Clackmannan and East Stirlingshire CC	County of Clackmannan; Eastern Number One, Eastern Number Two, and Eastern Number Three districts of county of Stirling
Stirling and Clackmannan	West Stirlingshire CC	Central Number One, Central Number Two, Western Number One, Western Number Two, and Western Number Three districts of county of Stirling; Burghs of Bridge of Allan, Denny and Dunipace, and Kilsyth in county of Stirling
West Lothian	West Lothian CC	County of West Lothian; Overall boundary as Linlithgow 1918 to 1950 and West Lothian 1950 to 1955
