= Scottish Westminster constituencies 1950 to 1955 =

Overview
1708 to 1832
1832 to 1868
1868 to 1885
1885 to 1918
1918 to 1950
1950 to 1955
1955 to 1974
1974 to 1983
1983 to 1997
1997 to 2005
2005 to 2024
since 2024

Under the Representation of the People Act 1948 and the House of Commons (Redistribution of Seats) Act 1949 new constituency boundaries were defined and first used in the 1950 general election of the House of Commons of the Parliament of the United Kingdom (Westminster).

In Scotland, where boundaries had been unaltered since 1918, the legislation defined 32 burgh constituencies (BCs) and 39 county constituencies (CCs), with each electing one Member of Parliament (MP) by the first past the post system of election. Therefore, Scotland had 71 parliamentary seats.

Scottish Westminster constituencies, 1950–1955.

Each constituency was entirely within a county or a grouping of two counties, or was if the cities of Aberdeen, Dundee, Edinburgh and Glasgow are regarded as belonging, respectively to the county of Aberdeen, the county of Angus, the county of Midlothian and the county of Lanark.

There were changes to the boundaries of six Scottish constituencies for the 1951 general election but, throughout the 1950 to 1955 period, there was no change to county groupings, to the total numbers of constituencies and MPs, or to constituency names.

Boundaries used during the 1950 to 1955 period represented an interim arrangement pending the outcome of the First Periodical Review of the boundary commissions. The results of the review were implemented for the 1955 general election.

County or group of counties	Constituency or constituencies	Contents of constituency
Aberdeen, including the County of the city of Aberdeen	Aberdeen North BC	Gilcomston, Greyfriars, St Clement, St Machar, and Woodside wards of city
Aberdeen, including the County of the city of Aberdeen	Aberdeen South BC	Ferryhill, Holburn, Rosemount, Rubislaw, Ruthrieston, and Torry wards of city
Aberdeen, including the County of the city of Aberdeen	East Aberdeenshire CC	Deer, Ellon, Huntly, and Turriff districts of county Burghs of Ellon, Fraserburgh, Huntly, Peterhead, Rosehearty, and Turriff
Aberdeen, including the County of the city of Aberdeen	West Aberdeenshire CC	Aberdeen, Alford, Deeside, and Garioch districts of county Burghs of Ballater, Inverurie, Kintore, and Oldmeldrum
Angus, including the County of Dundee, and Kincardine	Dundee East BC	First, Fourth, Fifth, Tenth, Eleventh, and Twelfth wards of city
Angus, including the County of Dundee, and Kincardine	Dundee West BC	Second, Third, Sixth, Seventh, Eighth, and Ninth wards of city
Angus, including the County of Dundee, and Kincardine	North Angus and Mearns CC	County of Kindardine; Brechin and Montrose districts of county of Angus; Burghs of Brechin and Montrose in county of Angus
Angus, including the County of Dundee, and Kincardine	South Angus CC	Carnoustie, Forfar, Kirriemuir, and Monifieth districts of county of Angus; Burghs of Carnoustie, Forfar, Kirriemuir, and Monifieth in county of Angus
Argyll	Argyll CC	County of Argyll; Overall boundary as 1918 to 1950
Ayr and Bute	Ayr CC	Part of Ayr district Burghs if Ayr and Prestwick in county of Ayr
Ayr and Bute	Bute and North Ayrshire CC	County of Bute; Salcoats district of county of Ayr; Burghs of Ardrossan, Largs, and Saltcoats in county of Ayr
Ayr and Bute	Central Ayrshire CC	Irvine and Kilwinning districts and part of Ayr and part of Kilmarnock districts of county of Ayr; Burghs of Irvine, Kilwinning, Stewarton, and Troon in county of Ayr
Ayr and Bute	Kilmarnock CC	Newmilns district and part of Kilmarnock district of county of Ayr; Burghs of Darvel, Galston, Kilmarnock, and Newmilns and Greenholm in county of Ayr
Ayr and Bute	South Ayrshire CC	Cumnock, Dalmellington, Girvan, and Maybole districts of county of Ayr; Burghs of Cumnock and Holmhead, Girvan, and Maybole in county of Ayr
Banff	Banffshire CC	County of Banff; Overall boundary as 1918 to 1950
Berwick and East Lothian	Berwick and East Lothian CC	Counties of Berwick and East Lothian; Overall boundary as Berwick and Haddington CC 1918 to 1950
Caithness and Sutherland	Caithness and Sutherland CC	Counties of Caithness and Sutherland; Overall boundary as 1918 to 1950
Dumfries	Dumfriesshire CC	County of Dumfries; Minor alteration to overall boundary of 1918 to 1950
Dunbarton	East Dunbartonshire CC	1950: Cumbernauld, Kirkintilloch, and New Kilpatrick districts Burghs of Clydebank, Kirkintilloch, and Milngavie; 1951: Description as 1950 but burgh of Clydebank altered
Dunbarton	West Dunbartonshire CC	1950: Helensburgh, Old Kilpatrick, and Vale of Leven districts Burghs of Cove and Kilcreggan, Dumbarton, and Helensburgh; 1951: Description as 1950 but Old Kilpatrick district altered
Fife	Dunfermline Burghs BC	Burghs of Cowdenbeath, Dunfermline, Inverkeithing, and Lochgelly
Fife	Kirkcaldy Burghs BC	1950: Burghs of Buckhaven and Methil, Burntisland, Kinghorn, and Kirkcaldy; 1951: Description as 1950 but burgh of Kirkcaldy altered
Fife	East Fife CC	Anstruther, Cupar, and St Andrews districts and part of Wemyss district Burghs of Auchtermuchty, Crail, Elie and Earlsferry, Falkland, Kilrenny and Anstruther Easter and Anstruther Wester, Ladybank, Leven, Newburgh, Newport, Pittenweem, St Andrews, St Monance, and Tayport
Fife	West Fife CC	1950: Dunfermline, Kirkcaldy, and Lochgelly districts and part of Wemyss district Burghs of Culross, Leslie, and Markinch; 1951: Description as 1950 but Kirkcaldy district altered
Inverness and Ross and Cromarty	Inverness CC	County of Inverness except Outer Hebridean districts (Barra, Harris, North Uist, and South Uist); Overall boundary as 1918 to 1950
Inverness and Ross and Cromarty	Ross and Cromarty CC	County of Ross and Cromarty except Outer Hebridean district (Lewis) and burgh (Stornoway); Overall boundary as 1918 to 1950
Inverness and Ross and Cromarty	Western Isles CC	Outer Hebridean districts (Barra, Harris, North Uist, and South Uist) of the county of Inverness; Outer Hebridean district (Harris) of the county of Ross and Cromarty; Outer Hebridean burgh of Stornoway in the county of Ross and Cromarty; Overall boundary as 1918 to 1950
Kirkcudbright and Wigtown	Galloway	Counties of Kirkcudbright and Wigtown; Minor alteration to overall boundary of 1918 to 1950
Lanark, including the County of Glasgow	Coatbridge and Airdrie BC	Burghs of Coatbridge and Airdrie
Lanark, including the County of Glasgow	Glasgow Bridgeton BC	Calton and Dalmarnock wards of city
Lanark, including the County of Glasgow	Glasgow Camlachie BC	Dennistoun and Provan wards and part of Mile-End ward of city
Lanark, including the County of Glasgow	Glasgow Cathcart BC	Cathcart and Langside wards and part of Govanhill ward of city
Lanark, including the County of Glasgow	Glasgow Central BC	Exchange and Townhead wards of city
Lanark, including the County of Glasgow	Glasgow Gorbals BC	Gorbals and Hutchesontown wards and part of Govanhill ward of city
Lanark, including the County of Glasgow	Glasgow Govan BC	Craigton and Fairfield wards and part of Govan ward of city
Lanark, including the County of Glasgow	Glasgow Hillhead BC	Kelvinside and Partick West wards and part of Partick East ward of city
Lanark, including the County of Glasgow	Glasgow Kelvingrove BC	Anderston and Park wards of city
Lanark, including the County of Glasgow	Glasgow Maryhill BC	Maryhill and Ruchill wards of city
Lanark, including the County of Glasgow	Glasgow Pollok BC	Camphill, Pollokshaws, and Pollokshields wards of city
Lanark, including the County of Glasgow	Glasgow Scotstoun BC	Knightswood, Whiteinch, and Yoker wards of city
Lanark, including the County of Glasgow	Glasgow Shettleston BC	Parkhead, and Shettleston and Tollcross wards and part of Mile-End ward of city
Lanark, including the County of Glasgow	Glasgow Springburn BC	Cowcaddens, Cowlairs, and Springburn wards of city
Lanark, including the County of Glasgow	Glasgow Tradeston BC	Kinning Park and Kingston wards and part of Govan ward of city
Lanark, including the County of Glasgow	Glasgow Woodside BC	North Kelvin and Woodside wards and part of Partick East ward of city
Lanark, including the County of Glasgow	Bothwell CC	Sixth district and part of Ninth district
Lanark, including the County of Glasgow	Hamilton CC	Part of Fourth and part of Fifth districts
Lanark, including the County of Glasgow	Lanark CC	First, Second, and Third districts and part of Fourth and part of Fifth districts Burghs of Biggar and Lanark
Lanark, including the County of Glasgow	Motherwell CC	Part of Seventh district Burgh of Motherwell and Wishaw, Lanarkshire
Lanark, including the County of Glasgow	North Lanarkshire CC	Part of Seventh and part of Ninth districts
Lanark, including the County of Glasgow	Rutherglen CC	Eighth district Burgh of Rutherglen
Midlothian, including the County of Edinburgh, and Peebles	Edinburgh Central BC	George Square, Holyrood, and St Giles wards of city
Midlothian, including the County of Edinburgh, and Peebles	Edinburgh East BC	Craigentinny, Craigmillar, and Portobello wards of city Burgh of Musselburgh
Midlothian, including the County of Edinburgh, and Peebles	Edinburgh Leith BC	Central Leith, South Leith, and West Leith wards of city
Midlothian, including the County of Edinburgh, and Peebles	Edinburgh North BC	Broughton, Calton, and St Andrew's wards of city
Midlothian, including the County of Edinburgh, and Peebles	Edinburgh Pentlands BC	Collinton, Gorgie-Dalry, Merchiston, and Sighthill wards of city
Midlothian, including the County of Edinburgh, and Peebles	Edinburgh South BC	Liberton, Morningside, and Newington wards of city
Midlothian, including the County of Edinburgh, and Peebles	Edinburgh West BC	Corstorphine, Murrayfield-Cramond, Pilton, and St Bernard's wards of city
Midlothian, including the County of Edinburgh, and Peebles	Midlothian and Peebles CC	Counties of Midlothian except city of Edinburgh and burgh of Musselburgh and Peebles
Moray and Nairn	Moray and Nairn CC	Counties of Moray and Nairn; Overall boundary as 1918 to 1950
Orkney and Shetland	Orkney and Zetland CC	Counties of Orkney and Shetland; Overall boundary as 1918 to 1950
Perth and Kinross	Kinross and West Perthshire CC	County of Kinross; Central, Highland, and Western districts of county of Perth; Burghs of Aberfeldy, Auchterarder, Callander, Crieff, Doune, Dunblane, and Pitlochry in county of Perth; Overall boundary as Kinross and Western Perthshire 1918 to 1950
Perth and Kinross	Perth and East Perthshire CC	Eastern and Perth districts of county of Perth; Burghs of Abernethy, Alyth, Blairgowrie and Rattray, Coupar Angus, and Perth in county of Perth; Overall boundary as Perth 1918 to 1950
Renfrew	Greenock BC	Burgh of Greenock, Renfrewshire
Renfrew	Paisley BC	Burgh of Paisley, Renfrewshire
Renfrew	East Renfrewshire CC	1950: First and Second districts Burghs of Barrhead and Renfrew; 1951: Description as 1950 but Second district altered
Renfrew	West Renfrewshire CC	1950: Third, Fourth, and Fifth districts Burghs of Gourock and Johnstone; 1951: Description as 1950 but burgh of Johnstone altered
Roxburgh and Selkirk	Roxburgh and Selkirk CC	Counties of Roxburgh and Selkirk
Stirling and Clackmannan	Stirling and Falkirk Burghs	Burghs of Falkirk, Grangemouth, and Stirling in county of Stirling
Stirling and Clackmannan	Clackmannan and East Stirlingshire CC	County of Clackmannan; Eastern Number One, Eastern Number Two, and Eastern Number Three districts of county of Stirling
Stirling and Clackmannan	West Stirlingshire CC	Central Number One, Central Number Two, Western Number One, Western Number Two, and Western Number Three districts of county of Stirling; Burghs of Bridge of Allan, Denny and Dunipace, and Kilsyth in county of Stirling
West Lothian	West Lothian CC	County of West Lothian; Overall boundary as Linlithgow 1918 to 1950
