= Scottish Westminster constituencies 1918 to 1950 =

Overview
1708 to 1832
1832 to 1868
1868 to 1885
1885 to 1918
1918 to 1950
1950 to 1955
1955 to 1974
1974 to 1983
1983 to 1997
1997 to 2005
2005 to 2024
since 2024

Provisions of the Representation of the People Act 1918 included reorganisation of representation in the House of Commons of the Parliament of the United Kingdom (Westminster), with new constituency boundaries being first used in the 1918 general election.

In Scotland the legislation defined 32 burgh constituencies, 38 county constituencies and one university constituency. One burgh constituency, Dundee, represented seats for two members of parliament (MPs), and the university constituency represented seats for three MPs.

Scottish Westminster constituencies, 1918–1950.

Each of the other constituencies elected one MP. Therefore, the legislation provided parliamentary seats for a total of 74 Scottish MPs.

Constituencies defined by this legislation were used also in the general elections of 1922, 1923, 1924, 1929, 1931, 1935 and 1945.

For the 1950 general election, new boundaries were introduced under the House of Commons (Redistribution of Seats) Act 1949.

== Burgh constituencies ==
Parliamentary burgh	Contents of parliamentary burgh	Constituency or constituencies	Contents of constituency
Aberdeen	County of city of Aberdeen	North	Greyfriars, St Andrew, St Clement, St Machar, Torry, and Woodside wards
Aberdeen	County of city of Aberdeen	South	Ferryhill, Rosemount, Rubislaw, Ruthrieston, and St Nicholas wards
Ayr District of Burghs	Burghs of Ayr, Ardrossan, Irvine, Prestwick, Saltcoats, and Troon in county of Ayr	Ayr District of Burghs	As parliamentary burgh
Dumbarton District of Burghs	Burghs of Dumbarton and Clydebank in county of Dumbarton	Dumbarton District of Burghs	As parliamentary burgh
Dundee	County of city of Dundee	Dundee, electing two MPs	As parliamentary burgh
Dunfermline District of Burghs	Burghs of Dunfermline, Cowdenbeath, Inverkeithing, and Lochgelly in county of Fife	Dunfermline District of Burghs	As parliamentary burgh
Edinburgh	County of city of Edinburgh; Burgh of Musselburgh in county of Midlothian	Central	George Square, St Giles', and St Leonard's wards of county of city
Edinburgh	County of city of Edinburgh; Burgh of Musselburgh in county of Midlothian	East	Conongate and Portobello wards of county of city Burgh of Musselburgh
Edinburgh	County of city of Edinburgh; Burgh of Musselburgh in county of Midlothian	North	Broughton, Calton, St Andrew's, and St Stephen's wards of county of city
Edinburgh	County of city of Edinburgh; Burgh of Musselburgh in county of Midlothian	South	Merchiston, Morningside, and Newington wards of county of city
Edinburgh	County of city of Edinburgh; Burgh of Musselburgh in county of Midlothian	West	Dairy, Gorgie, Haymarket, and St Bernard's wards of county of city
Glasgow	County of city of Glasgow	Bridgeton	Calton and Dalmarnock wards
Glasgow	County of city of Glasgow	Camlachie	Dennistoun, Mile-End, and Whitevale wards
Glasgow	County of city of Glasgow	Cathcart	Cathcart, Govanhill, and Langside wards
Glasgow	County of city of Glasgow	Central	Blythswood, Exchange, and Townhead wards
Glasgow	County of city of Glasgow	Gorbals	Gorbals and Hutchestontown wards
Glasgow	County of city of Glasgow	Govan	Fairfield and Govan wards
Glasgow	County of city of Glasgow	Hillhead	Kelvinside and Partick East wards
Glasgow	County of city of Glasgow	Kelvingrove	Anderston, Park, and Sandyford wards
Glasgow	County of city of Glasgow	Maryhill	Maryhill, North Kelvin, and Ruchill wards
Glasgow	County of city of Glasgow	Partick	Partick West and Whiteinch wards
Glasgow	County of city of Glasgow	Pollok	Camphill, Pollockshaws, and Pollockshields wards
Glasgow	County of city of Glasgow	St. Rollox	Cowcadden and Woodside wards
Glasgow	County of city of Glasgow	Shettleston	Parkhead, and Settleston and Tollcross wards
Glasgow	County of city of Glasgow	Springburn	Cowlairs, Provan, and Springburn wards
Glasgow	County of city of Glasgow	Tradeston	Kingston and Kinning Park wards
Greenock	Burgh of Greenock in county of Renfrew	Greenock	As parliamentary burgh
Kirkcaldy District of Burghs	Burghs of Kirkcaldy, Fife, Buckhaven, Methil and Innerleven, Burntisland, Dysart and Kinghorn in county of Fife	Kirkcaldy District of Burghs	As parliamentary burgh
Leith	Burgh of Leith in county of Midlothian	Leith	As parliamentary burgh
Montrose District of Burghs	Burghs of Montrose, Arbroath, Brechin, and Forfar in county of Forfar and burgh of Inverbervie in county of Kincardine	Montrose District of Burghs	As parliamentary burgh
Paisley	Burgh of Paisley in county of Renfrew	Paisley	As parliamentary burgh
Stirling and Falkirk District of Burghs	Burghs of Stirling, Falkirk, and Grangemouth in county of Stirling	Stirling and Falkirk District of Burghs	As parliamentary burgh

== County constituencies ==
Parliamentary county	Contents of parliamentary county	Constituency or constituencies	Contents of constituency
Aberdeen and Kincardine	County of Aberdeen except portion of county of city of Aberdeen within county County of Kincardine except portion of county of city of Aberdeen within county and burgh of Inverbervie	Central	Ellon, Garioch, and Huntly districts of county of Aberdeen; Burghs of Ellon, Huntly, Inverurie, Kintore and Old Meldrum in county of Aberdeen
Aberdeen and Kincardine	County of Aberdeen except portion of county of city of Aberdeen within county County of Kincardine except portion of county of city of Aberdeen within county and burgh of Inverbervie	Eastern	Deer and Turriff districts of county of Aberdeen; Burghs of Fraserburgh, Peterhead, Rosehearty and Turriff in county of Aberdeen
Aberdeen and Kincardine	County of Aberdeen except portion of county of city of Aberdeen within county County of Kincardine except portion of county of city of Aberdeen within county and burgh of Inverbervie	Kincardine and Western	County of Kincardine except burgh of Inverbervie and portion of county of city of Aberdeen within county Alford and Deeside districts of county of Aberdeen; Burgh of Ballater in county of Aberdeen
Argyll	County of Argyll	Argyll	As parliamentary county
Ayr and Bute	County of Ayr except burghs of Ardrossan, Ayr, Irvine, Prestwick, Saltcoats, and Troon; County of Bute	Bute and Northern	County of Bute; Northern Ayr district
Ayr and Bute	County of Ayr except burghs of Ardrossan, Ayr, Irvine, Prestwick, Saltcoats, and Troon; County of Bute	Kilmarnock	Kilmarnock district of county of Ayr; Burghs of Darvel, Galston, Kilmarnock, and Newmilns and Greenholm in county of Ayr
Ayr and Bute	County of Ayr except burghs of Ardrossan, Ayr, Irvine, Prestwick, Saltcoats, and Troon; County of Bute	South Ayrshire	Ayr and Carrick districts of county of Ayr; Burghs of Cumnock and Holmhead, Girvan, and Maybole in county of Ayr
Banff	County of Banff	Banff	As parliamentary county
Berwick and Haddington	County of Berwick; County of Haddington	Berwick and Haddington	As parliamentary county
Caithness and Sutherland	County of Caithness; County of Sutherland	Caithness and Sutherland	As parliamentary county
Dumfries	County of Dumfries	Dumfries	As parliamentary county
Dumbarton	County of Dumbarton except burghs of Dumbarton and Clydebank	Dumbarton	As parliamentary county
Fife	County of Fife except burghs of Dunfermline, Cowdenbeath, Inverkeithing, Lochgelly, Kirkcaldy, Buckhaven, Methil and Innerleven, Burntisland, Dysart, and Kinghorn	Eastern	Cupar and St Andrew's districts Burghs of Anstruther Easter, Anstruther Wester, Auchtermuchty, Crail, Cupar, Earlsferry, Elie, Falkland, Kilrenny, Ladybank, Leven, Newburgh, Newport, Pittenweem, St Andrews, and Tayport.
Fife	County of Fife except burghs of Dunfermline, Cowdenbeath, Inverkeithing, Lochgelly, Kirkcaldy, Buckhaven, Methil and Innerleven, Burntisland, Dysart, and Kinghorn	Western	Dunfermline district and part of Kirkcaldy district Burghs of Culross, Leslie, and Markinch
Forfar	County of Forfar except county of city of Dundee and burghs of Montrose, Arbroath, Brechin, and Forfar	Forfar	As parliamentary county
Galloway	County of Kirkcudbright; County of Wigtown	Galloway	As parliamentary county
Inverness and Ross and Cromarty	County of Inverness; County of Ross and Cromarty	Inverness	County of Inverness except Outer Hebridean districts (Harris, North Uist, and South Uist)
Inverness and Ross and Cromarty	County of Inverness; County of Ross and Cromarty	Ross and Cromarty	County of Ross and Cromarty except Outer Hebridean district (Lewis) and burgh (Stornoway)
Inverness and Ross and Cromarty	County of Inverness; County of Ross and Cromarty	Western Isles	Outer Hebridean districts (Harris, North Uist, and South Uist) of the county of Inverness; Outer Hebridean district (Harris) of the county of Ross and Cromarty; Outer Hebridean burgh of Stornoway in the county of Ross and Cromarty
Lanark	County of Lanark except county of city of Glasgow and so much of burgh of Renfrew as within parish of Govan	Bothwell	Part of Middle Ward district
Lanark	County of Lanark except county of city of Glasgow and so much of burgh of Renfrew as within parish of Govan	Coatbridge	Burghs of Airdrie and Coatbridge
Lanark	County of Lanark except county of city of Glasgow and so much of burgh of Renfrew as within parish of Govan	Hamilton	Part of Middle Ward district Burgh of Hamilton
Lanark	County of Lanark except county of city of Glasgow and so much of burgh of Renfrew as within parish of Govan	Lanark	Upper Ward district and part of Middle Ward district Burghs of Biggar and Lanark
Lanark	County of Lanark except county of city of Glasgow and so much of burgh of Renfrew as within parish of Govan	Motherwell	Part of Middle Ward district Burghs of Motherwell and Wishaw
Lanark	County of Lanark except county of city of Glasgow and so much of burgh of Renfrew as within parish of Govan	Northern	Part of Lower Ward district and part of Middle Ward district
Lanark	County of Lanark except county of city of Glasgow and so much of burgh of Renfrew as within parish of Govan	Rutherglen	Part of Lower Ward district and part of Middle Ward district Burgh of Rutherglen
Linlithgow	County of Linlithgow	Linlithgow	As parliamentary county
Midlothian and Peebles	County of Midlothian except county of city of Edinburgh and burghs of Leith and Musselburgh; County of Peebles	Northern	Calder and Suburban districts and part of Lasswade district of the county of Midlothian
Midlothian and Peebles	County of Midlothian except county of city of Edinburgh and burghs of Leith and Musselburgh; County of Peebles	Peebles and Southern	County of Peebles; Gala Water district and part of Lasswade district of county of Midlothian; Burghs of Bonnyrigg, Lasswade, and Penicuik in county of Midlothian
Moray and Nairn	County of Moray; County of Nairn	Moray and Nairn	As parliamentary county
Orkney and Zetland	County of Orkney; County of Zetland	Orkney and Zetland	As parliamentary county
Perth and Kinross	County of Perth; County of Kinross	Kinross and Western	County of Kinross; Central, Highland, and Western districts of county of Perth; Burghs of Aberfeldy, Auchterarder, Callander, Crieff, Doune and Dunblane in county of Perth
Perth and Kinross	County of Perth; County of Kinross	Perth	Blairgowrie and Perth districts of county of Perth; Burghs of Abernethy, Alyth, Blairgowrie, Coupar Angus, Perth, and Rattray in county of Perth
Renfrew	County of Renfrew except burghs of Greenock and Paisley; So much of burgh of Renfrew as within parish of Govan in county of Lanark	Eastern	Upper district Burghs of Barrhead and Renfrew
Renfrew	County of Renfrew except burghs of Greenock and Paisley; So much of burgh of Renfrew as within parish of Govan in county of Lanark	Western	Lower district Burghs of Gourock, Johnstone, and Port Glasgow
Roxburgh and Selkirk	County of Roxburgh; County of Selkirk	Roxburgh and Selkirk	As parliamentary county
Stirling and Clackmannan	County of Stirling except burghs of Stirling, Falkirk and Grangemouth; County of Clackmannan	Clackmannan and Eastern	County of Clackmannan; Eastern district of county of Stirling
Stirling and Clackmannan	County of Stirling except burghs of Stirling, Falkirk and Grangemouth; County of Clackmannan	Western	Central and Western districts of county of Stirling; Burghs of Bridge of Allan, Denny and Dunipace, and Kilsyth in county of Stirling

== University constituency ==
Constituency	Contents
Combined Scottish Universities, electing three MPs	Universities of Aberdeen, Edinburgh, Glasgow, and St Andrews
