= Scottish Westminster constituencies 1708 to 1832 =

Overview
1708 to 1832
1832 to 1868
1868 to 1885
1885 to 1918
1918 to 1950
1950 to 1955
1955 to 1974
1974 to 1983
1983 to 1997
1997 to 2005
2005 to 2024
since 2024

As a result of the 1707 union of the Kingdom of Scotland with the Kingdom of England (including Wales) to form the Kingdom of Great Britain, within the newly formed Parliament of Great Britain, Scotland had 48 constituencies representing seats for 45 Members of Parliament (MPs) in the House of Commons, normally located at the Palace of Westminster. (Westminster being the meeting place for the former Parliament of England).

Scottish Westminster constituencies, 1707–1832.

Scottish Westminster constituencies were first used in the 1708 general election. Prior to that election Scotland was represented by MPs who were co-opted as commissioners of the former Parliament of Scotland.

In the Parliament of Great Britain, Scotland had 15 burgh constituencies and 33 county constituencies, with each representing a seat for one MP. The county constituencies included, however, three pairs of alternating constituencies, so that only one member of a pair was represented at any one time. Therefore, Scotland had more constituencies than seats. With the exception of Edinburgh, the burgh constituencies were districts of burghs.

1708 boundaries were used for all subsequent elections of the Parliament of Great Britain.

In 1801 the Parliament of Ireland was merged with the Parliament of Great Britain to form the Parliament of the United Kingdom, also at Westminster. The first general election of the new parliament was the general election of 1802, and there was no change to the boundaries of any pre-existing Westminster constituency.

1802 boundaries were used also in the general elections of 1806, 1807, 1812, 1818, 1820, 1826, 1830 and 1831.

For the 1832 general election, Scottish Westminster constituencies were redefined by the Representation of the People (Scotland) Act 1832.

== Burgh constituencies ==
Constituency	Contents
Aberdeen District	In county of Aberdeen: burgh of Aberdeen; In county of Forfar: burghs of Arbroath, Brechin, and Montrose; In county of Kincardine: burgh of Inverbervie
Anstruther District	In county of Fife: burghs of Anstruther Easter, Anstruther Wester, Crail, Kilrenny, and Pittenweem
Ayr District	In county of Ayr: burghs of Ayr and Irvine; In county of Argyll: burghs of Campbeltown and Inverary; In county of Bute: burgh of Rothesay
Dumfries District	In county of Dumfries: burghs of Annan, Dumfries, Lochmaben, and Sanquhar; In county of Kirkcudbright: burgh of Kirkcudbright
Dysart District	In county of Fife: burghs of Kirkcaldy, Burntisland, Dysart, and Kinghorn
Edinburgh	In county of Edinburgh: burgh of Edinburgh
Elgin District	In county of Aberdeen: burghs of Inverurie and Kintore; In county of Banff: burgh of Banff; In county of Elgin: burghs of Elgin and Cullen
Glasgow District	In county of Dumbarton: burgh of Dumbarton; In county of Lanark: burghs of Glasgow and Rutherglen; In county of Renfrew: burgh of Renfrew
Haddington District	In county of Berwick: burgh of Lauder; In county of Haddington burghs of Dunbar, Haddington, and North Berwick; In county of Roxburgh: burgh of Jedburgh
Inverness District	In county of Elgin: burgh of Forres; In county of Inverness: burgh of Inverness; In county of Nairn: burgh of Nairn; In county of Ross: burgh of Fortrose
Linlithgow District	In county of Lanark: burgh of Lanark; In county of Linlithgow: burgh of Linlithgow; In county of Peebles: burgh of Peebles; In county of Selkirk: burgh of Selkirk
Perth District	In county of Fife: burghs of Cupar and St Andrews; In county of Forfar: burghs of Dundee and Forfar; In county of Perth: burgh of Perth
Stirling District	In county of Fife: burghs of Dunfermline and Inverkeithing; In county of Linlithgow: burgh of Queensferry; In county of Perth: burgh of Culross; In county of Stirling: burgh of Stirling
Tain District	In county of Caithness: burgh of Wick; In county of Orkney: burgh of Kirkwall; In county of Sutherland: burgh of Dornoch; In county of Ross: burghs of Dingwall and Tain
Wigtown District	In county of Wigtown: burghs of New Galloway, Stranraer, Wigtown, and Whithorn

== County constituencies ==
Constituency	Contents
Aberdeenshire	County of Aberdeen except burghs of Aberdeen, Inverurie, and Kintore
Argyll	County of Argyll except burghs of Campbeltown and Inverary
Ayrshire	County of Ayr except burghs of Ayr and Irvine
Banffshire	County of Banff except burgh of Banff
Berwickshire	County of Berwick except burgh of Lauder
Buteshire; Alternated with Caithness	County of Bute except burgh of Rothesay
Caithness; Alternated with Buteshire	County of Caithness except burgh of Wick
Clackmannanshire; Alternated with Kinross-shire	County of Clackmannan
Cromartyshire; Alternated with Nairnshire	County of Cromarty
Dumbartonshire	County of Dumbarton except burgh of Dumbarton
Dumfriesshire	County of Dumfries except burghs of Dumfries, Annan, Lochmaben, and Sanquhar
Edinburghshire	County of Edinburgh except burgh of Edinburgh
Elginshire	County of Elgin except burghs of Elgin, Forres, and Cullen
Fife	County of Fife except burghs of Anstruther Easter, Anstruther Wester, Burntisland, Cupar, Crail, Dysart, Dunfermline, Inverkeithing, Kinghorn, Kirkcaldy, Pittenweem, Kilrenny, and St Andrews
Forfarshire	County of Forfar except burghs of Dundee, Forfar, Montrose, Brechin, and Arbroath
Haddingtonshire	County of Haddington except burghs of Dunbar, Haddington, and North Berwick
Inverness-shire	County of Inverness except burgh of Inverness
Kincardineshire	County of Kincardine except burgh of Inverbervie
Kinross-shire; Alternated with Clackmannanshire	County of Kinross
Kirkcudbrightshire	County of Kirkcudbright except burgh of Kirkcudbright
Lanarkshire	County of Lanark except burghs of Glasgow, Lanark, and Rutherglen
Linlithgowshire	County of Linlithgow except burghs of Linlithgow and Queensferry
Nairnshire; Alternated with Cromartyshire	County of Nairn except burgh of Nairn
Orkney and Zetland	County of Orkney except burgh of Kirkwall and county of Zetland
Peeblesshire	County of Peebles except burgh of Peebles
Perthshire	County of Perth except burghs of Culross and Perth
Renfrewshire	County of Renfrew except burgh of Renfrew
Ross-shire	County of Ross except burghs of Dingwall, Fortrose, and Tain
Roxburghshire	County of Roxburgh except burgh of Jedburgh
Selkirkshire	County of Selkirk except burgh of Selkirk
Stirlingshire	County of Stirling except burgh of Stirling
Sutherland	County of Sutherland except burgh of Dornoch
Wigtownshire	County of Wigtown except burghs of New Galloway, Stranraer, Wigtown, and Whithorn
