= Scottish Westminster constituencies 1885 to 1918 =

Overview
1708 to 1832
1832 to 1868
1868 to 1885
1885 to 1918
1918 to 1950
1950 to 1955
1955 to 1974
1974 to 1983
1983 to 1997
1997 to 2005
2005 to 2024
since 2024

The Redistribution of Seats Act 1885 (48 & 49 Vict. c. 23) redefined the boundaries of English, Scottish and Welsh constituencies of the House of Commons of the Parliament of the United Kingdom (at Westminster), and the new boundaries were first used in the 1885 general election. The boundaries of Irish constituencies were not affected.

1885 boundaries were used also in the general elections of 1886, 1892, 1895, 1900, 1906, January 1910 and December 1910.

In Scotland, as a result of the legislation, there were 32 burgh constituencies, 37 county constituencies and two university constituencies. Except for Dundee, which was a two-seat constituency, each Scottish constituency represented a seat for one Member of Parliament (MP). Therefore, Scotland had 72 MPs.

The 1885 legislation detailed boundary changes but did not detail boundaries for all constituencies. For a complete picture of boundaries in Scotland, it has to be read in conjunction with the Representation of the People (Scotland) Act 1832 and the Representation of the People (Scotland) Act 1868.

In Scotland, constituencies related nominally to counties and burghs, but boundaries for parliamentary purposes were not necessarily those for other purposes. Also, county boundaries were altered by the Local Government (Scotland) Act 1889 and by later related legislation. The Representation of the People Act 1918 redefined constituency boundaries in relation to new local government boundaries, and these newer constituency boundaries were first used in the 1918 general election.

== Burgh constituencies ==
Parliamentary burgh	Nominal contents of parliamentary burgh	Constituency or constituencies
Aberdeen	In county of Aberdeen: burgh of Aberdeen	Aberdeen North
Aberdeen	In county of Aberdeen: burgh of Aberdeen	Aberdeen South
Ayr District of Burghs	In county of Ayr : burghs of Ayr and Irvine; In county of Argyll: burghs of Campbeltown, Inverary, and Oban	Ayr District of Burghs
Dumfries District of Burghs	In county of Dumfries: burghs of Annan, Dumfries, Lochmaben and Sanquhar; In county of Kirkcudbright: burgh of Kirkcudbright.	Dumfries District of Burghs
Dundee	In county of Forfar: burgh of Dundee	Dundee; Elected two MPs
Edinburgh	In county of Edinburgh: burgh of Edinburgh	Edinburgh Central
Edinburgh	In county of Edinburgh: burgh of Edinburgh	Edinburgh East
Edinburgh	In county of Edinburgh: burgh of Edinburgh	Edinburgh South
Edinburgh	In county of Edinburgh: burgh of Edinburgh	Edinburgh West
Elgin District of Burghs	In county of Elgin: burgh of Elgin; In county of Banff: burghs of Cullen and Banff; In county of Aberdeen: burghs of Inverurie, Kintore, and Peterhead	Elgin District of Burghs
Falkirk District of Burghs	In county of Lanark: burghs of Airdrie, Hamilton, and Lanark; In county of Linlithgow: burgh of Linlithgow; In county of Stirling: burgh of Falkirk	Falkirk District of Burghs
Glasgow	In county of Lanark: burgh of Glasgow	Glasgow Blackfriars and Hutchesontown
Glasgow	In county of Lanark: burgh of Glasgow	Glasgow Bridgeton
Glasgow	In county of Lanark: burgh of Glasgow	Glasgow Camlachie
Glasgow	In county of Lanark: burgh of Glasgow	Glasgow Central
Glasgow	In county of Lanark: burgh of Glasgow	Glasgow College
Glasgow	In county of Lanark: burgh of Glasgow	Glasgow St Rollox
Glasgow	In county of Lanark: burgh of Glasgow	Glasgow Tradeston
Govan	In county of Lanark: burgh of Govan	Govan
Greenock	In county of Renfrew: burgh of Greenock	Greenock
Hawick District of Burghs	In county of Roxburgh: burgh of Hawick; In county of Selkirk burghs of Galashiels and Selkirk	Hawick District of Burghs
Inverness District of Burghs	In county of Elgin: burgh of Forres; In county of Inverness: burgh of Inverness; In county of Nairn: burgh of Nairn; In county of Ross: burgh of Fortrose	Inverness District of Burghs
Kilmarnock District of Burghs	In county of Ayr: burgh of Kilmarnock; In county of Dumbarton: burgh of Dumbarton; In the county of Lanark: burgh of Rutherglen; In the county of Renfrew: burghs of Renfrew and Port Glasgow	Kilmarnock District of Burghs
Kirkcaldy District of Burghs	In county of Fife: burghs of Burntisland, Dysart, Kinghorn and Kirkcaldy	Kirkcaldy District of Burghs
Leith District of Burghs	In county of Edinburgh: burghs of Leith, Musselburgh, and Portobello	Leith District of Burghs
Montrose District of Burghs	In county of Forfar: burghs of Arbroath, Brechin, Forfar, and Montrose; In county of Kincardine: burgh of Inverbervie	Montrose District of Burghs
Paisley	In county of Renfrew: burgh of Paisley	Paisley
Partick	In county of Lanark: burgh of Partick	Partick
Perth	In county of Perth: burgh of Perth	Perth
St Andrews District of Burghs	In county of Fife: burghs of St Andrews, Anstruther Easter, Anstruther Wester, Crail, Cupar, Kilrenny and Pittenweem	St Andrews District of Burghs
Stirling District of Burghs	In county of Fife: burghs of Dunfermline and Inverkeithing; In county of Linlithgow: burgh of South Queensferry; In county of Perth: burgh of Culross; In county of Stirling: burgh of Stirling	Stirling District of Burghs
Wick District of Burghs	In county of Caithness: burgh of Wick; In county of Cromarty: burgh of Cromarty; In county of Orkney: burgh of Kirkwall; In county of Ross: burghs of Dingwall and Tain; In county of Sutherland: burgh of Dornoch	Wick District of Burghs

== County constituencies ==
Parliamentary county	Nominal contents of parliamentary county	Constituency or constituencies
Aberdeen	County of Aberdeen; Excluded burghs of Aberdeen, Inverurie, Kintore, and Peterhead	Eastern Aberdeenshire
Aberdeen	County of Aberdeen; Excluded burghs of Aberdeen, Inverurie, Kintore, and Peterhead	Western Aberdeenshire
Argyll	County of Argyll; Excluded burgh of Oban	Argyllshire
Ayr	County of Ayr; Excluded burghs of Ayr, Irvine, and Kilmarnock	North Ayrshire
Ayr	County of Ayr; Excluded burghs of Ayr, Irvine, and Kilmarnock	South Ayrshire
Banff	County of Banff; Excluded burghs of Banff and Cullen	Banffshire
Berwick	County of Berwick	Berwickshire
Bute	County of Bute	Buteshire
Caithness	County of Caithness; Excluded burgh of Wick	Caithness
Clackmannan and Kinross	County of Clackmannan and county of Kinross	Clackmannanshire and Kinross-shire
Dumfries	County of Dumfries; Excluded burghs of Annan, Dumfries, Lochmaben, and Sanquhar	Dumfriesshire
Dumbarton	County of Dumbarton; Excluded burgh of Dumbarton	Dumbartonshire
Edinburgh	County of Edinburgh; Excluded burghs of Edinburgh, Leith, Musselburgh, and Portobello	Edinburghshire
Elgin and Nairn	County of Elgin and county of Nairn; Excluded burgh of Elgin, Forres, and Nairn	Elginshire and Nairnshire
Fife	County of Fife; Excluded burghs of Anstruther Easter, Anstruther Wester, Burntisland, Crail, Culross, Dunfermline, Dysart, Inverkeithing, Kilrenny, Kinghorn, Kirkcaldy, and Pittenweem	East Fife
Fife	County of Fife; Excluded burghs of Anstruther Easter, Anstruther Wester, Burntisland, Crail, Culross, Dunfermline, Dysart, Inverkeithing, Kilrenny, Kinghorn, Kirkcaldy, and Pittenweem	West Fife
Forfar	County of Forfar; Excluded burghs of Arbroath, Brechin, Dundee, Forfar, and Montrose	Forfarshire
Haddington	County of Haddington	Haddingtonshire
Inverness	County of Inverness; Excluded burgh of Inverness	Inverness-shire
Kirkcudbright	County of Kirkcudbright; Excluded burghs of Kirkcudbright and New Galloway	Kirkcudbrightshire
Kincardine	County of Kincardine; Excluded burgh of Inverbervie	Kincardineshire
Lanark	County of Lanark; Excluded burghs of Airdrie, Glasgow, Govan, Lanark, Partick, Rutherglen, and Hamilton	Mid Lanarkshire
Lanark	County of Lanark; Excluded burghs of Airdrie, Glasgow, Govan, Lanark, Partick, Rutherglen, and Hamilton	North East Lanarkshire
Lanark	County of Lanark; Excluded burghs of Airdrie, Glasgow, Govan, Lanark, Partick, Rutherglen, and Hamilton	North West Lanarkshire
Lanark	County of Lanark; Excluded burghs of Airdrie, Glasgow, Govan, Lanark, Partick, Rutherglen, and Hamilton	South Lanarkshire
Linlithgow	County of Linlithgow; Excluded burghs of Linlithgow and South Queensferry	Linlithgowshire
Orkney and Zetland	County of Orkney and county of Zetland; Excluded burgh of Kirkwall	Orkney and Zetland
Peebles and Selkirk	County of Peebles and county of Selkirk; Excluded burghs of Galashiels and Selkirk	Peebles and Selkirk
Perth	County of Perth; Excluded burgh of Perth	East Perthshire
Perth	County of Perth; Excluded burgh of Perth	West Perthshire
Renfrew	County of Renfrew; Excluded burghs of Paisley, Port Glasgow, and Renfrew	East Renfrewshire
Renfrew	County of Renfrew; Excluded burghs of Paisley, Port Glasgow, and Renfrew	West Renfrewshire
Ross and Cromarty	County of Ross and county of Cromarty; Excluded burghs of Cromarty, Dingwall, Fortrose, and Tain	Ross and Cromarty
Roxburgh	County of Roxburgh; Excluded burgh of Hawick	Roxburghshire
Stirling	County of Stirling; Excluded burghs of Falkirk and Stirling	Stirlingshire
Sutherland	County of Sutherland; Excluded burgh of Dornoch	Sutherland
Wigtown	County of Wigtown	Wigtownshire

== University constituencies ==
Constituency	Contents
Edinburgh and St Andrews Universities	Universities of Edinburgh and St Andrews
Glasgow and Aberdeen Universities	Universities of Glasgow and Aberdeen

== See also ==
- List of UK Parliamentary constituencies (1885-1918)
