= Scottish Westminster constituencies 1983 to 1997 =

Overview
1708 to 1832
1832 to 1868
1868 to 1885
1885 to 1918
1918 to 1950
1950 to 1955
1955 to 1974
1974 to 1983
1983 to 1997
1997 to 2005
2005 to 2024
since 2024

The results of the Third Periodical Review of the Boundary Commission for Scotland were implemented for the 1983 general election of the House of Commons of the Parliament of the United Kingdom (Westminster).

The review defined 30 burgh constituencies (BCs) and 42 county constituencies (CCs), with each electing one Member of Parliament (MP) by the first past the post system of election. Therefore, Scotland had 72 parliamentary seats.

Scottish Westminster constituencies, 1983–1997.

In 1975, Scottish counties had been abolished under the Local Government (Scotland) Act 1973, and the Third Periodical Review took account of new local government boundaries, which defined two-tier regions and districts and unitary islands council areas. No new constituency straddled a regional boundary, and each islands council area was entirely within one constituency.

The boundary commission was required to designate each new constituency as either burgh or county but had no predetermined basis on which to do so. The commission took the view that each constituency with more than a token rural electorate would be a county constituency, and others, predominantly urban, would be burgh constituencies.

1983 boundaries were used also in the general elections of 1987 and 1992.

The results of the Fourth Periodical Review were implemented for the 1997 general election

== Boundaries ==
=== Regions, except Strathclyde ===
Region	Constituencies	Contents of constituency
Borders	Roxburgh and Berwickshire CC	Roxburgh district Berwickshire district
Borders	Tweeddale, Ettrick and Lauderdale CC	Tweeddale district Ettrick and Lauderdale district
Central	Clackmannan CC	Clackmannan district In Falkirk district: Carseland (13) regional electoral division In Stirling district: Kinnaird (29) regional electoral division
Central	Falkirk East CC	In Falkirk district: Bainsford (19), Dundas (22), Kalantyre (23), Sealock (24), Carriden (25), Kinneil (26), Braes (32), and Avonside regional electoral divisions
Central	Falkirk West CC	In Falkirk district: Callander (17), Grahamsdyke (18), Glenfuir (20), Carmuirs (21), Herbertshire (27), Tryst (28), Carronglen (30), and Bonnybridge (31) regional electoral divisions
Central	Stirling CC	Stirling district except Carseland (13) regional electoral division
Dumfries and Galloway	Dumfries CC	Annandale and Eskdale district In Nithsdale district: Locharbriggs (17), Tinwald Downs (18), Lochar (19), St Marys (21), Noblehill (22), St Michaels (23), Rotchwell (24), Palmerston (25), Lochside (26), and Maryholm (27) electoral divisions
Dumfries and Galloway	Galloway and Upper Nithsdale CC	Stewartry district Wigtown district In Nithsdale district: Kirkconnel (14), Sanquhar and Queensberry (15), Mid Nithsdale (16), and Mabie (20) regional electoral divisions
Fife	Central Fife CC	In Kirkcaldy district: Denbeath/Aberhill (10), Mountfleurie/Methilhill/Methil North (11), Leven (12), Kennoway/Windygates (13), Leslie/Markinch Star (14), Auchmuty/Woodside (15), Pitteuchar/Stenton/Balgonie (16), South Parks/Rimbleton (17), and Southwood/Caskieberran (18) regional electoral divisions
Fife	Dunfermline East CC	In Dunfermline district: Kelty/Lumphinnans (31), Ballingry/Lochore (32), Lochgelly (33), Aberdour/Dalgety Bay/North Queensferry (34), Inverkeithing/Rosyth (35), Cowdenbeath/Gray Park (36), Hill of Beath/Crossgates/Cowdenbeath (37), and Dunfermline/Rosyth regional electoral divisions In Kirkcaldy district: Auchterderran (19) regional electoral division
Fife	Dunfermline West CC	In Dunfermline district: Kincardine/Culross (29), Torryburn/Oakley (30), Dunfermline/Halbeath Kingseat (38), Dunfermline/Milesmark (39), Dunfermline/Crossford (40), Dunfermline/Limekilns (41), Dunfermline/Garvock (42), Dunfermline/Woodmill (43), and Dunfermline/ Aberdour Road (44) regional electoral divisions
Fife	Kirkcaldy CC	In Kirkcaldy district: Burntisland/Kinghorn (1), Auchtertool/Linktown/Invertiel (2), Bennochy/Chapel/Cluny (3), Dunnikier (4), Bennochy/Dunearn (5), Hayfield/Kirkcaldy Central (6), Smeaton/Sinclairtown (7), Gallatown/Dysart/Coaltown of Wemyss/Thornton (8), and Buckhaven/East Wemyss (9) regional electoral divisions
Fife	North East Fife CC	North East Fife district
Grampian	Aberdeen North BC	In City of Aberdeen district: Woodside (25), St Machar (26), Northfield East (27), Northfield West (28), Kittybrewster (29), Seaton (30), Mastrick (31), Ashgrove (32), Summerfield (33), and Brimmond (48) regional electoral divisions
Grampian	Aberdeen South BC	In City of Aberdeen district: Rosemount (34), Rubislaw (35), St Clements (36), St Nicholas (37), Hazlehead (38), Holburn (39), Ferryhill (40), Torry (41), and Nigg (45) regional electoral divisions
Grampian	Banff and Buchan CC	Banff and Buchan district
Grampian	Gordon CC	Gordon district In Aberdeen district: West Don (47) and East Don (49) regional electoral divisions
Grampian	Kincardine and Deeside CC	Kincardine and Deeside district In Aberdeen district: Craigton (42), Auchinyell (43), Kincorth (44), and Peterculter (46) regional electoral divisions
Grampian	Moray CC	Moray district
Highland	Caithness and Sutherland CC	Caithness district Sutherland district
Highland	Inverness, Nairn and Lochaber CC	Badenoch and Strathspey district Lochaber district Nairn district In Inverness district, Merkinch (31), Dalneigh-Muirtown (32), Ballifeary and Columba (33), Ness Central (34), Crown-Raigmore (35), Old Edinburgh (36), Drummond (37), Hilton (38), Ardersier Petty and Culloden (39), Inverness East (39A), and Strathdearn Strathnairn and Loch Ness East (40) regional electoral divisions
Highland	Ross, Cromarty and Skye CC	Ross and Cromarty district Skye and Lochalsh district In Inverness district: Aird South (41), Charlston (41A), and Aird North (42) regional electoral divisions
Lothian	Edinburgh Central BC	In City of Edinburgh district: Murrayfield/Dean (20), New Town/Stockbridge (21), Dalry/Shandon (27), Haymarket/Tollcross (28), and St Giles/Holyrood (29) regional electoral divisions
Lothian	Edinburgh East BC	In City of Edinburgh district: Calton/Lochend (22), Willowbrae/Mountcastle (30), Portobello/Milton (31), and Niddrie/Craigmillar (29), regional electoral divisions and Craigentinny (30) district ward
Lothian	Edinburgh Leith BC	In City of Edinburgh district: Pilton/Muirhouse (12), Granton/Trinity (13), Newhaven/Fort (14), Broughton/Inverleith (17), and Lorne/Harbour (18) regional electoral divisions and Links (29) district ward
Lothian	Edinburgh Pentlands BC	In City of Edinburgh district: Balerno/Baberton (10), Hailes (24), Sighthill/Longstone (25), Colinton/Firrhill (35), and Braidburn/Fairmilehead (36) regional electoral divisions
Lothian	Edinburgh South BC	In City of Edinburgh district: Merchiston/Morningside (32), Sciennes/Marchmont (33), Prestonfield/Mayfield (34), Alnwickhill/Kaimes (37), and Inch/Gilmerton (38) regional electoral divisions
Lothian	Edinburgh West BC	In City of Edinburgh district: Cramond/Parkgrave (11), Corstorphine North (15), Telford/Blackhall (16), Corstorphine South (19), and Moat/Stenhouse (26) regional electoral divisions
Lothian	East Lothian CC	East Lothian district
Lothian	Linlithgow CC	In West Lothian district: Linlithgow (1), Bathgate West/Armadale (2), Bathgate East (3), and Whiteburn (4) regional electoral divisions In City of Edinburgh district: Queensferry (1) district ward
Lothian	Livingston CC	In West Lothian district: Livingston (North) (5), Livingstone (South) (6), Broxburn (7), and Calders (8) regional electoral divisions In Edinburgh district: Kirkliston (2) district ward
Lothian	Midlothian CC	Midlothian district
Tayside	Dundee East BC	In City of Dundee district: Welgate/Baxter Park (11), Craigiebank (12), West Ferry/Broughty Ferry (13), Balgillo/Eastern (14), Douglas/Drumgeith (15), Whitfield/Longhaugh (16), Fintry (17), Caird/Midhill (18), Clepington/Maryfield (19), and Coldside/Hilltown (20) regional electoral divisions
Tayside	Dundee West BC	In City of Dundee district: Central/Riverside (21), Dudhope/Logie (22), Law/Ancrum (23), Menziehill/Ninewells (24), Gourdie/Pitalpin (25), Lochee (26), Rockwell/Fairmuir (27), Trottick/Gillburn (28), Downfield/St Mary's (29), and Ardler/Blackside (30) regional electoral divisions
Tayside	East Angus CC	In Angus district: Aberbrothock (1), Arbroath Elliot (2), Arbroath St Vigeans (3), Carnoustie (4), Montrose Northesk (6), Montrose Lunan (9), Brechin (10), and Eastern Glens (15) regional electoral divisions In City of Dundee district: Monifieth (31) regional electoral division and Sidlaw (44) district ward
Tayside	North Tayside CC	In Angus district: Forfar East and Dunnichen (5) and Forfar West and Strathmore (8) regional electoral divisions and Kirriemuir (13) and Western Glens (15) district wards In Perth and Kinross district: Atholl Breadalbane and Rannoch (38), Strathardle (39), Strathisla (40), Strathtay (43), and St martins (44) regional electoral divisions
Tayside	Perth and Kinross CC	In Perth and Kinross district: Inveralmond (33), Moncrieffe (34), St Johnstoun (35), Viewlands (36), Letham (37), Strathearn (41), Tullibardine (42), Gowrie (45), and Kinross (46) regional electoral divisions In City of Dundee district: Gowrie (43) district ward

=== Strathclyde ===
The districts of Strathclyde can be grouped as follows.

District or districts	Constituency or constituencies	Contents of constituency
Argyll and Bute	Argyll and Bute CC	District
Bearsden and Milngavie, Clydebank, Monklands, and Strathkelvin	Monklands East BC	In Monklands district : Airdrie East (54), Airdrie South and West (55), and Chapelhall and Salsburgh (56) regional electoral divisions
Bearsden and Milngavie, Clydebank, Monklands, and Strathkelvin	Monklands West BC	In Monklands district: Coatbridge North (52) and Coatbridge South (53) regional electoral divisions In Strathkelvin district: Chryston and Kelvin Valley (48) regional electoral division
Bearsden and Milngavie, Clydebank, Monklands, and Strathkelvin	Clydebank and Milngavie CC	Clydesdale district In Bearsden and Milngavie district: Barloch (1), Keystone (2), Craigdhu (3), and Clober (4) regional electoral divisions
Bearsden and Milngavie, Clydebank, Monklands, and Strathkelvin	Strathkelvin and Bearsden CC	In Strathkelvin district: Kirkintillock (46) and Bishopbriggs (47) regional electoral divisions In Bearsden and Milngavie district: Bearsden (45) regional electoral division and Kilmardinny (5) district ward
City of Glasgow	Glasgow Cathcart BC	Pollokshaws/Newlands (36), King's Park/Aitkenhead (37), and Linn Park/Castlemilk (39) regional electoral divisions
City of Glasgow	Glasgow Central BC	Central/Calton (21), Kingston/Hutchesontown (34), and Queen's Park/Crosshill (35) regional electoral divisions
City of Glasgow	Glasgow Garscadden BC	Drumry/Summerhill (9), Blairdardie/Knightscliffe (10), and Yoker/Kinightswood (11) regional electoral divisions
City of Glasgow	Glasgow Govan BC	Drumoyne/Govan (28), Penilee/Cardonald (29), and Mosspark/Bellahouston (30) regional electoral divisions
City of Glasgow	Glasgow Hillhead BC	Scotstoun/Bromhill (12), Kelvindale/Kelvinside (13) and Partick/Anderston (17) regional electoral divisions
City of Glasgow	Glasgow Maryhill BC	Summerston/Maryhill (14), Milton/Ruchill (15), and North Kelvin/Woodlands (16) regional electoral divisions
City of Glasgow	Glasgow Pollok BC	Pollok/Cowglen (31), South Nitshill/Arden (32), and Pollokshields/Shawlands (33) regional electoral divisions
City of Glasgow	Glasgow Provan BC	Lethamhill/Riddrie (24), Queenslie/Barlanark (25), and Gartloch/Easterhouse (41) regional electoral divisions
City of Glasgow	Glasgow Rutherglen BC	Toryglen/Rutherglen (38), Glenwood/Fernhill (40), and Cambuslang/Halfway (41) regional electoral divisions
City of Glasgow	Glasgow Shettleston BC	Belvidere/Carntyne (22), Parkhead/Shettleston (23), and Mount/Baillieston (26) regional electoral divisions
City of Glasgow	Glasgow Springburn BC	? (18), Keppochhill/Cowlairs (19) and Alexandra Park/Dennistoun (20) regional electoral divisions
Clydesdale, and Hamilton	Hamilton BC	In Hamilton district: Hamilton East (63), Hamilton West (64), and Hamilton North (66) regional electoral divisions
Clydesdale, and Hamilton	Clydesdale BC	Clydesdale district In Hamilton district: Larkhall and Stonehouse (65) regional electoral division
Cumbernauld and Kilsyth	Cumbernauld and Kilsyth CC	District
Cumnock and Doon Valley, and Kyle and Carrick	Ayr CC	In Kyle and Carrick district: Ayr North (97), Ayr South (98), and North Kyle (100) regional electoral divisions and St Cuthberts (11), St Nicholas (12), and Kingcase (13) district wards
Cumnock and Doon Valley, and Kyle and Carrick	Carrick, Cumnock and Doon Valley CC	Carrick, Cumnock and Doon Valley district In Kyle and Carrick district: Carrick (101) regional electoral division and Annbank Mossblown and St Quivox (14) and Coylton and Kincaidston (15) district wards
Cunninghame	Cunninghame North CC	Garnock Valley (91), Saltcoats and Ardrossan (92), and Arran Largs and West Kilbride (93) regional electoral divisions
Cunninghame	Cunninghame South CC	Irvine Central (88), Irvine South (89), and Kilwinning and Stevenson (90) regional electoral divisions
Dumbarton	Dumbarton CC	District
East Kilbride	East Kilbride CC	District
Eastwood, Inverclyde, and Renfrew	Greenock and Port Glasgow BC	In Inverclyde district: Cartsdyke (85) and Greenock South West (86) regional electoral divisions and Port Glasgow East (2), Port Glasgow South (3), Clune Brae (4), Port Glasgow West (5), Greenock West Central (16), and Greenock West End (17) district wards
Eastwood, Inverclyde, and Renfrew	Paisley North BC	In Renfrew district: Paisley Craigielea (75), Paisley Abercorn (78), and Renfrew (81) regional electoral divisions
Eastwood, Inverclyde, and Renfrew	Paisley South BC	In Renfrew district: Paisley Gleniffer (76), Paisley Central (77), and Johnstone (80) regional electoral divisions
Eastwood, Inverclyde, and Renfrew	Eastwood CC	Eastwood district In Renfrew district: Barrhead (79) regional electoral division
Eastwood, Inverclyde, and Renfrew	Renfrew West and Inverclyde CC	In Renfrew district: Gryffee (22) and Bargarran (83) regional electoral divisions In Inverclyde district: Kilmalcom (1), Cardwell Bay (18), Gourock (19), and Firth (20) district wards
Kilmarnock and Loudoun	Kilmarnock and Loudoun CC	District
Motherwell	Motherwell North BC	Fortissat (60), Bellshill and Tannochside (61), and Clydesdale (62) regional electoral divisions
Motherwell	Motherwell South BC	Dalziel (57), Wishaw (58), and Clydevale (59) regional electoral divisions

=== Islands council areas ===
Islands council area or areas	Constituency	Contents of constituency
Orkney and Shetland	Orkney and Shetland CC	Islands council areas Overall boundary as Orkney and Zetland 1918 to 1983
Western Isles	Western Isles CC	Islands council area Overall boundary as 1918 to 1983

== See also ==
- List of UK Parliamentary constituencies (1983-1997)
