= Scottish Westminster constituencies from 2024 =

Overview
1708 to 1832
1832 to 1868
1868 to 1885
1885 to 1918
1918 to 1950
1950 to 1955
1955 to 1974
1974 to 1983
1983 to 1997
1997 to 2005
2005 to 2024
since 2024

As a result of the 2023 review of Westminster constituencies by the Boundary Commission for Scotland, Scotland is covered by 57 constituencies of the House of Commons of the Parliament of the United Kingdom: 17 burgh constituencies and 40 county constituencies. These constituencies are in use from the 2024 general election.

Name	Boundaries
1. Aberdeen North BC; 2. Aberdeen South BC; 3. Aberdeenshire North and Moray East CC; 4. Airdrie and Shotts CC; 5. Alloa and Grangemouth CC; 6. Angus and Perthshire Glens CC; 7. Arbroath and Broughty Ferry CC; 8. Argyll, Bute and South Lochaber CC; 9. Ayr, Carrick and Cumnock CC; 10. Bathgate and Linlithgow CC; 11. Berwickshire, Roxburgh and Selkirk CC; 12. Caithness, Sutherland and Easter Ross CC; 13. Central Ayrshire CC; 14. Coatbridge and Bellshill BC; 15. Cowdenbeath and Kirkcaldy CC; 16. Cumbernauld and Kirkintilloch CC; 17. Dumfries and Galloway CC; 18. Dumfriesshire, Clydesdale and Tweeddale CC; 19. Dundee Central BC; 20. Dunfermline and Dollar CC; 21. East Kilbride and Strathaven CC; 22. East Renfrewshire CC; 23. Edinburgh East and Musselburgh BC; 24. Edinburgh North and Leith BC; 25. Edinburgh South BC; 26. Edinburgh South West BC; 27. Edinburgh West BC; 28. Falkirk CC; 29. Glasgow East BC; 30. Glasgow North BC; 31. Glasgow North East BC; 32. Glasgow South BC; 33. Glasgow South West BC; 34. Glasgow West BC; 35. Glenrothes and Mid Fife CC; 36. Gordon and Buchan CC; 37. Hamilton and Clyde Valley CC; 38. Inverclyde and Renfrewshire West CC; 39. Inverness, Skye and West Ross-shire CC; 40. Kilmarnock and Loudoun CC; 41. Livingston CC; 42. Lothian East CC; 43. Mid Dunbartonshire CC; 44. Midlothian CC; 45. Moray West, Nairn and Strathspey CC; 46. Motherwell, Wishaw and Carluke CC; 47. Na h-Eileanan an Iar CC; 48. North Ayrshire and Arran CC; 49. North East Fife CC; 50. Orkney and Shetland CC; 51. Paisley and Renfrewshire North BC; 52. Paisley and Renfrewshire South CC; 53. Perth and Kinross-shire CC; 54. Rutherglen BC; 55. Stirling and Strathallan CC; 56. West Aberdeenshire and Kincardine CC; 57. West Dunbartonshire CC	Numbered map of the parliamentary constituencies of Scotland created by the 2023 boundary review and first used at the 2024 UK general election.
Numbered map of the parliamentary constituencies in the Central Belt of Scotland created by the 2023 boundary review and first used at the 2024 UK general election.

== Boundary changes ==
See 2023 review of Westminster constituencies for further details.

=== Background ===
The Boundary Commission for Scotland submitted their final proposals in respect of the Sixth Periodic Review of Westminster Constituencies (the 2018 review) in September 2018. Although the proposals were immediately laid before Parliament they were not brought forward by the Government for approval. Accordingly, they did not come into effect for the 2019 election which took place on 12 December 2019, and which was contested using the constituency boundaries in place since 2010.

Under the terms of the Parliamentary Voting System and Constituencies Act 2011, the Sixth Review was based on reducing the total number of MPs from 650 to 600 and a strict electoral parity requirement that the electorate of all constituencies should be within a range of 5% either side of the electoral quota.

On 24 March 2020, the Minister of State for the Cabinet Office, Chloe Smith, issued a written statement to Parliament setting out the Government's thinking with regard to parliamentary boundaries. Subsequently, the Parliamentary Constituencies Act 2020 ("the Act") was passed into law on 14 December 2020. This formally removed the duty to implement the 2018 review and set out the framework for future boundary reviews. The Act provided that the number of constituencies should remain at the current level of 650, rather than being reduced to 600, while retaining the requirement that the electorate should be no more than +/- 5% from the electoral quota.

=== Process ===
The Act specified that the next review had to be completed no later than 1 July 2023 and the Boundary Commission formally launched the 2023 Review on 5 January 2021. In accordance with the provisions of the Act, the number of constituencies allocated to Scotland decreased by 2, from 59 to 57. This includes the protected constituencies of Na h-Eileanan an Iar and Orkney and Shetland.

As part of public consultations for the 2023 review of Westminster constituencies, the Boundary Commission for Scotland released its initial proposals on 14 October 2021. Following two periods of public consultation, revised proposals were published on 8 November 2022. Final recommendations were laid before Parliament on 28 June 2023 after they were published and then submitted a day earlier.

=== Recommended seats ===
Under the final recommendations the following constituencies for Scotland came into effect at the 2024 general election:

Council areas	Constituencies	Electorate
Orkney Islands; Shetland Islands	Orkney and Shetland CC (continuing)	34,824
Na h-Eileanan an Iar	Na h-Eileanan an Iar CC (continuing)	21,177
Aberdeen City	Aberdeen North BC (continuing)	76,895
Aberdeen City	Aberdeen South BC (continuing)	76,560
Aberdeenshire; Argyll and Bute; Highland; Moray	Aberdeenshire North and Moray East CC	71,485
Aberdeenshire; Argyll and Bute; Highland; Moray	Argyll, Bute and South Lochaber CC	71,707
Aberdeenshire; Argyll and Bute; Highland; Moray	Caithness, Sutherland and Easter Ross CC (continuing)	75,173
Aberdeenshire; Argyll and Bute; Highland; Moray	Gordon and Buchan CC	70,238
Aberdeenshire; Argyll and Bute; Highland; Moray	Inverness, Skye and West Ross-shire CC	76,903
Aberdeenshire; Argyll and Bute; Highland; Moray	Moray West, Nairn and Strathspey CC	76,237
Aberdeenshire; Argyll and Bute; Highland; Moray	West Aberdeenshire and Kincardine CC (continuing)	73,634
Angus; Clackmannanshire; Dundee City; Falkirk; Fife; Perth and Kinross; Stirling; West Lothian	Alloa and Grangemouth CC	72,265
Angus; Clackmannanshire; Dundee City; Falkirk; Fife; Perth and Kinross; Stirling; West Lothian	Angus and Perthshire Glens CC	77,006
Angus; Clackmannanshire; Dundee City; Falkirk; Fife; Perth and Kinross; Stirling; West Lothian	Arbroath and Broughty Ferry CC	76,810
Angus; Clackmannanshire; Dundee City; Falkirk; Fife; Perth and Kinross; Stirling; West Lothian	Bathgate and Linlithgow CC	71,650
Angus; Clackmannanshire; Dundee City; Falkirk; Fife; Perth and Kinross; Stirling; West Lothian	Cowdenbeath and Kirkcaldy CC	70,329
Angus; Clackmannanshire; Dundee City; Falkirk; Fife; Perth and Kinross; Stirling; West Lothian	Dundee Central BC	75,298
Angus; Clackmannanshire; Dundee City; Falkirk; Fife; Perth and Kinross; Stirling; West Lothian	Dunfermline and Dollar CC	70,725
Angus; Clackmannanshire; Dundee City; Falkirk; Fife; Perth and Kinross; Stirling; West Lothian	Falkirk CC (continuing)	75,067
Angus; Clackmannanshire; Dundee City; Falkirk; Fife; Perth and Kinross; Stirling; West Lothian	Glenrothes and Mid Fife CC	69,734
Angus; Clackmannanshire; Dundee City; Falkirk; Fife; Perth and Kinross; Stirling; West Lothian	Livingston CC (continuing)	75,454
Angus; Clackmannanshire; Dundee City; Falkirk; Fife; Perth and Kinross; Stirling; West Lothian	North East Fife CC (continuing)	70,452
Angus; Clackmannanshire; Dundee City; Falkirk; Fife; Perth and Kinross; Stirling; West Lothian	Perth and Kinross-shire CC	76,323
Angus; Clackmannanshire; Dundee City; Falkirk; Fife; Perth and Kinross; Stirling; West Lothian	Stirling and Strathallan CC	77,008
City of Edinburgh; East Lothian; Midlothian	Edinburgh East and Musselburgh BC (restored; previously existed 1997–2005)	75,705
City of Edinburgh; East Lothian; Midlothian	Edinburgh North and Leith BC (continuing)	76,770
City of Edinburgh; East Lothian; Midlothian	Edinburgh South BC (continuing)	70,980
City of Edinburgh; East Lothian; Midlothian	Edinburgh South West BC (continuing)	73,315
City of Edinburgh; East Lothian; Midlothian	Edinburgh West BC (continuing)	76,723
City of Edinburgh; East Lothian; Midlothian	Lothian East CC	71,287
City of Edinburgh; East Lothian; Midlothian	Midlothian CC (continuing)	71,210
Dumfries and Galloway; East Dunbartonshire; North Lanarkshire; Scottish Borders; South Lanarkshire; West Dunbartonshire	Airdrie and Shotts CC (continuing)	70,420
Dumfries and Galloway; East Dunbartonshire; North Lanarkshire; Scottish Borders; South Lanarkshire; West Dunbartonshire	Berwickshire, Roxburgh and Selkirk CC (continuing)	74,687
Dumfries and Galloway; East Dunbartonshire; North Lanarkshire; Scottish Borders; South Lanarkshire; West Dunbartonshire	Coatbridge and Bellshill BC	72,507
Dumfries and Galloway; East Dunbartonshire; North Lanarkshire; Scottish Borders; South Lanarkshire; West Dunbartonshire	Cumbernauld and Kirkintilloch CC	70,579
Dumfries and Galloway; East Dunbartonshire; North Lanarkshire; Scottish Borders; South Lanarkshire; West Dunbartonshire	Dumfries and Galloway CC (continuing)	76,863
Dumfries and Galloway; East Dunbartonshire; North Lanarkshire; Scottish Borders; South Lanarkshire; West Dunbartonshire	Dumfriesshire, Clydesdale and Tweeddale CC (continuing)	70,738
Dumfries and Galloway; East Dunbartonshire; North Lanarkshire; Scottish Borders; South Lanarkshire; West Dunbartonshire	East Kilbride and Strathaven CC	75,161
Dumfries and Galloway; East Dunbartonshire; North Lanarkshire; Scottish Borders; South Lanarkshire; West Dunbartonshire	Hamilton and Clyde Valley CC	74,577
Dumfries and Galloway; East Dunbartonshire; North Lanarkshire; Scottish Borders; South Lanarkshire; West Dunbartonshire	Mid Dunbartonshire CC	75,099
Dumfries and Galloway; East Dunbartonshire; North Lanarkshire; Scottish Borders; South Lanarkshire; West Dunbartonshire	Motherwell, Wishaw and Carluke CC	72,318
Dumfries and Galloway; East Dunbartonshire; North Lanarkshire; Scottish Borders; South Lanarkshire; West Dunbartonshire	Rutherglen BC (restored; previously existed 1918–1983; Glasgow Rutherglen 1983–2005)	71,612
Dumfries and Galloway; East Dunbartonshire; North Lanarkshire; Scottish Borders; South Lanarkshire; West Dunbartonshire	West Dunbartonshire CC (continuing)	70,286
East Ayrshire; North Ayrshire; South Ayrshire	Ayr, Carrick and Cumnock CC (continuing)	72,057
East Ayrshire; North Ayrshire; South Ayrshire	Central Ayrshire CC (continuing)	69,779
East Ayrshire; North Ayrshire; South Ayrshire	Kilmarnock and Loudoun CC (continuing)	74,801
East Ayrshire; North Ayrshire; South Ayrshire	North Ayrshire and Arran CC (continuing)	73,588
East Renfrewshire	East Renfrewshire (continuing)	72,959
Glasgow City; Inverclyde; Renfrewshire	Glasgow East BC (continuing)	69,748
Glasgow City; Inverclyde; Renfrewshire	Glasgow North BC (continuing)	73,210
Glasgow City; Inverclyde; Renfrewshire	Glasgow North East BC (continuing)	75,236
Glasgow City; Inverclyde; Renfrewshire	Glasgow South BC (continuing)	71,344
Glasgow City; Inverclyde; Renfrewshire	Glasgow South West BC (continuing)	70,431
Glasgow City; Inverclyde; Renfrewshire	Glasgow West BC	72,499
Glasgow City; Inverclyde; Renfrewshire	Inverclyde and Renfrewshire West CC	70,418
Glasgow City; Inverclyde; Renfrewshire	Paisley and Renfrewshire North BC (continuing)	69,941
Glasgow City; Inverclyde; Renfrewshire	Paisley and Renfrewshire South CC (continuing)	69,813

== Constituencies ==
Scottish National Party Conservative Labour Liberal Democrats

Name	Electorate	Majority	Member of Parliament	Nearest opposition
Aberdeen North BC	75,925	1,760	Kirsty Blackman	Lynn Thomson
Aberdeen South BC	77,328	6,050	Douglas Lumsden	Richard Thomson
Aberdeenshire North and Moray East CC	70,058	942	Seamus Logan	Douglas Ross
Airdrie and Shotts CC	70,199	7,547	Kenneth Stevenson	Anum Qaisar
Alloa and Grangemouth CC	70,680	6,122	Brian Leishman	John Nicolson
Angus and Perthshire Glens CC	76,668	4,870	Dave Doogan	Stephen Kerr
Arbroath and Broughty Ferry CC	76,149	5,178	Lara Bird	Jack Cruickshanks
Argyll, Bute and South Lochaber CC	71,756	6,232	Brendan O'Hara	Amanda Hampsey
Ayr, Carrick and Cumnock CC	70,340	4,154	Elaine Stewart	Allan Dorans
Bathgate and Linlithgow CC	72,185	8,323	Kirsteen Sullivan	Martyn Day
Berwickshire, Roxburgh and Selkirk CC	76,438	6,599	John Lamont	David Wilson
Caithness, Sutherland and Easter Ross CC	74,627	10,489	Jamie Stone	Lucy Beattie
Central Ayrshire CC	69,413	6,869	Alan Gemmell	Annie McIndoe
Coatbridge and Bellshill BC	72,667	6,344	Frank McNally	Steven Bonnar
Cowdenbeath and Kirkcaldy CC	71,845	7,248	Melanie Ward	Lesley Backhouse
Cumbernauld and Kirkintilloch CC	70,350	4,144	Katrina Murray	Stuart McDonald
Dumfries and Galloway CC	78,541	930	John Cooper	Tracey Little
Dumfriesshire, Clydesdale and Tweeddale CC	71,900	4,242	David Mundell	Kim Marshall
Dundee Central BC	74,221	675	Chris Law	Richard McCready
Dunfermline and Dollar CC	72,824	8,241	Graeme Downie	Naz Anis-Miah
East Kilbride and Strathaven CC	76,414	9,057	Joani Reid	Grant Daniel Costello
East Renfrewshire CC	74,626	8,421	Blair McDougall	Kirsten Oswald
Edinburgh East and Musselburgh BC	76,188	3,715	Chris Murray	Tommy Sheppard
Edinburgh North and Leith BC	78,411	7,268	Tracy Gilbert	Deidre Brock
Edinburgh South BC	70,838	17,251	Ian Murray	Simita Kumar
Edinburgh South West BC	73,784	6,217	Scott Arthur	Joanna Cherry
Edinburgh West BC	76,490	16,470	Christine Jardine	Euan Hyslop
Falkirk CC	73,584	4,996	Euan Stainbank	Toni Giugliano
Glasgow East BC	68,987	3,784	John Grady	David Linden
Glasgow North BC	67,579	3,539	Martin Rhodes	Alison Thewliss
Glasgow North East BC	72,610	4,637	Maureen Burke	Anne McLaughlin
Glasgow South BC	70,219	4,154	Gordon McKee	Stewart McDonald
Glasgow South West BC	68,871	3,285	Zubir Ahmed	Chris Stephens
Glasgow West BC	69,028	6,446	Patricia Ferguson	Carol Monaghan
Glenrothes and Mid Fife CC	70,655	2,954	Richard Baker	John Beare
Gordon and Buchan CC	69,605	878	Harriet Cross	Richard Thomson
Hamilton and Clyde Valley CC	74,480	9,472	Imogen Walker	Ross Clark
Inverclyde and Renfrewshire West CC	70,126	6,371	Martin McCluskey	Ronnie Cowan
Inverness, Skye and West Ross-shire CC	77,927	2,160	Angus Macdonald	Drew Hendry
Kilmarnock and Loudoun CC	74,628	5,119	Lillian Jones	Alan Brown
Livingston CC	78,043	3,528	Gregor Poynton	Hannah Bardell
Lothian East CC	75,456	13,265	Douglas Alexander	Lyn Jardine
Mid Dunbartonshire CC	73,603	9,673	Susan Murray	Amy Callaghan
Midlothian CC	73,554	8,167	Kirsty McNeill	Owen Thompson
Moray West, Nairn and Strathspey CC	77,243	1,001	Graham Leadbitter	Kathleen Robertson
Motherwell, Wishaw and Carluke CC	71,777	7,085	Pamela Nash	Marion Fellows
Na h-Eileanan an Iar CC	21,325	3,836	Torcuil Crichton	Susan Thomson
North Ayrshire and Arran	72,176	3,551	Irene Campbell	Patricia Gibson
North East Fife CC	69,762	13,479	Wendy Chamberlain	Stefan Hoggan-Radu
Orkney and Shetland CC	34,236	7,807	Alistair Carmichael	Robert Leslie
Paisley and Renfrewshire North BC	71,103	6,333	Alison Taylor	Gavin Newlands
Paisley and Renfrewshire South CC	71,574	6,527	Johanna Baxter	Jacqueline Cameron
Perth and Kinross-shire CC	77,261	4,127	Pete Wishart	Luke Graham
Rutherglen BC	72,674	8,767	Michael Shanks	Katy Loudon
Stirling and Strathallan CC	76,284	1,394	Chris Kane	Alyn Smith
West Aberdeenshire and Kincardine CC	72,994	3,441	Andrew Bowie	Glen Reynolds
West Dunbartonshire CC	69,074	6,010	Douglas McAllister	Martin Docherty-Hughes

== List of constituencies by party ==
2024 United Kingdom general election
Party	Constituency
Conservative	Berwickshire, Roxburgh and Selkirk; Dumfries and Galloway; Dumfriesshire, Clydesdale and Tweeddale; Gordon and Buchan; West Aberdeenshire and Kincardine
Labour	Airdrie and Shotts; Alloa and Grangemouth; Ayr, Carrick and Cumnock; Bathgate and Linlithgow; Central Ayrshire; Coatbridge and Bellshill; Cowdenbeath and Kirkcaldy; Cumbernauld and Kirkintilloch; Dunfermline and Dollar; East Kilbride and Strathaven; East Renfrewshire; Edinburgh East and Musselburgh; Edinburgh North and Leith; Edinburgh South; Edinburgh South West; Falkirk; Glasgow East; Glasgow North; Glasgow North East; Glasgow South; Glasgow South West; Glasgow West; Glenrothes and Mid Fife; Hamilton and Clyde Valley; Inverclyde and Renfrewshire West; Kilmarnock and Loudoun; Livingston; Lothian East; Midlothian; Motherwell, Wishaw and Carluke; Na h-Eileanan an Iar; North Ayrshire and Arran; Paisley and Renfrewshire North; Paisley and Renfrewshire South; Rutherglen; Stirling and Strathallan; West Dunbartonshire
Liberal Democrats	Caithness, Sutherland and Easter Ross; Edinburgh West; Inverness, Skye and West Ross-shire; Mid Dunbartonshire; North East Fife; Orkney and Shetland
SNP	Aberdeen North; Aberdeen South; Aberdeenshire North and Moray East; Angus and Perthshire Glens; Arbroath and Broughty Ferry; Argyll, Bute and South Lochaber; Dundee Central; Moray West, Nairn and Strathspey; Perth and Kinross-shire

By elections during the 2024–present parliament
Party	Constituency
Conservative	Aberdeen South
SNP	Arbroath and Broughty Ferry

== 2024 results ==
The number of votes cast for each political party who fielded candidates in constituencies in Scotland at the 2024 general election were as follows:

Party	Votes	%	Change from 2019	Seats	Change from 2019 (actual)	Change from 2019 (notional)
Labour	851,897	35.3	▲16.7	37	▲36	▲36
Scottish National Party	724,758	30.0	▼15.0	9	▼39	▼39
Conservative	307,344	12.7	▼12.4	5	▼1	▼1
Liberal Democrats	234,228	9.7	▲0.2	6	▲2	▲4
Reform UK	167,979	7.0	▲6.5	0	0	0
Green	92,685	3.8	▲2.8	0	0	0
Others	35,919	1.5	▲1.2	0	0	0
Total	2,414,810	100.0		57	▼2	

== Results history ==
Primary data source: House of Commons research briefing – General election results from 1918 to 2019 (2024 as above)

=== Percentage votes ===
Votes % Scotland

Key:

- CON – Conservative Party, including National Liberal Party up to 1966
- LAB – Labour Party, including Labour and Co-operative Party
- LIB – Liberal Party up to 1979; SDP-Liberal Alliance 1983 & 1987; Liberal Democrats from 1992
- SNP – Scottish National Party
- UKIP – UK Independence Party 2010 to 2017 (included in Other up to 2005 and from 2019)
- REF – Reform UK (2019 - Brexit Party)
- GRN – Scottish Greens (included in Other up to 2005)

=== Seats ===
Scotland seats won

Key:

- CON – Conservative Party, including National Liberal Party up to 1966
- LAB – Labour Party, including Labour and Co-operative Party
- LIB – Liberal Party up to 1979; SDP-Liberal Alliance 1983 & 1987; Liberal Democrats from 1992
- SNP – Scottish National Party
- OTH – 1945 - Independent Labour Party (3); Communist Party (1); Independent Unionist (John Mackie) (1); 1959 - Independent Unionist (David Robertson)

== See also ==
- List of Great Britain and UK Parliament constituencies in Scotland from 1707 for graphical representation by party
