= Scottish Westminster constituencies 1868 to 1885 =

Overview
1708 to 1832
1832 to 1868
1868 to 1885
1885 to 1918
1918 to 1950
1950 to 1955
1955 to 1974
1974 to 1983
1983 to 1997
1997 to 2005
2005 to 2024
since 2024

The Representation of the People (Scotland) Act 1868 redefined the boundaries of Scottish constituencies of the House of Commons of the Parliament of the United Kingdom (at Westminster), and the new boundaries were first used in the 1868 general election.

For the same general election, boundaries in England were redefined by the Representation of the People Act 1867 and there was, effectively, a transfer of seven parliamentary seats from England to Scotland.

1868 boundaries were used also in the general elections of 1874 and 1880.

As a result of the legislation, Scotland had 22 burgh constituencies, 32 county constituencies and two university constituencies. Except for Edinburgh, Dundee and Glasgow, each Scottish constituency represented a seat for one Member of Parliament (MP). Edinburgh and Dundee represented two seats each, and Glasgow represented three seats. Therefore, Scotland was entitled to 60 MPs.

15 of the burgh constituencies were districts of burghs.

The constituencies related nominally to counties and burghs, but boundaries for parliamentary purposes were not necessarily those for other purposes.

For the 1885 general election, new boundaries were defined by the Redistribution of Seats Act 1885.

== Burgh Constituencies ==
Constituency	Nominal Contents
Aberdeen	In county of Aberdeen: burgh of Aberdeen
Ayr District	In county of Ayr: burghs of Ayr and Irvine; In county of Argyll: burghs of Campbeltown, Inverary, and Oban
Dumfries District	In county of Dumfries: burghs of Annan, Dumfries, Lochmaben, and Sanquhar; In county of Kirkcudbright: burgh of Kirkcudbright
Dundee	In county of Forfar: burgh of Dundee; Elected two MPs
Edinburgh; Elected two MPs	In county of Edinburgh: burgh of Edinburgh
Elgin District	In county of Aberdeen: burghs of Inverurie, Kintore, and Peterhead; In county of Banff: burgh of Banff; In county of Elgin: burghs of Elgin and Cullen
Falkirk District	In county of Lanark: burghs of Airdrie, Hamilton, and Lanark; In county of Linlithgow: burgh of Linlithgow; In county of Stirling: burgh of Falkirk
Glasgow; Elected three MPs	In county of Lanark: burgh of Glasgow
Greenock	In county of Renfrew: burgh of Greenock
Haddington District	In county of Berwick: burgh of Lauder; In county of Haddington burghs of Dunbar, Haddington, and North Berwick; In county of Roxburgh: burgh of Jedburgh
Hawick District	In county of Roxburgh: burgh of Hawick; In county of Selkirk: burghs of Galashiels and Selkirk
Inverness District	In county of Elgin: burgh of Forres; In county of Inverness: burgh of Inverness; In county of Nairn: burgh of Nairn; In county of Ross: burgh of Fortrose
Kilmarnock District	In county of Ayr: burgh of Kilmarnock; In county of Dumbarton: burgh of Dumbarton; In county of Lanark: burgh of Rutherglen; In county of Renfrew: burghs of Port Glasgow and Renfrew
Kirkcaldy District	In county of Fife: burghs of Burntisland, Dysart, Kinghorn, and Kirkcaldy
Leith District	In county of Edinburgh: burghs of Leith, Portobello and Musselburgh
Montrose District	In county of Forfar: burghs of Arbroath, Brechin, Forfar, and Montrose; In county of Kincardine: burgh of Inverbervie
Paisley	In county of Renfrew: burgh of Paisley
Perth	In county of Perth: burgh of Perth
St Andrews District	In county of Fife: burghs of Anstruther Easter, Anstruther Wester, Crail, Cupar, Pittenweem, Kilrenny, and St Andrews
Stirling District	In county of Fife: burghs of Dunfermline and Inverkeithing; In county of Linlithgow: burgh of South Queensferry; In county of Perth: burgh of Culross; In county of Stirling: burgh of Stirling
Wick District	In county of Caithness: burgh of Wick; In county of Cromarty: burgh of Cromarty; In county of Orkney: burgh of Kirkwall; In county of Sutherland: burgh of Dornoch; In county of Ross: burghs of Dingwall and Tain
Wigtown District	In county of Wigtown: burghs of New Galloway, Stranraer, Wigtown, and Whithorn

== County constituencies ==
Parliamentary county	Nominal contents	Constituency or constituencies
Aberdeen	County of Aberdeen except burghs of Aberdeen, Inverurie, Kintore, and Peterhead	East Aberdeenshire
Aberdeen	County of Aberdeen except burghs of Aberdeen, Inverurie, Kintore, and Peterhead	West Aberdeenshire
Argyll	County of Argyll except burghs of Campbeltown, Inverary, and Oban	Argyll
Ayr	County of Ayr except burghs of Ayr, Irvine, and Kilmarnock	North Ayrshire
Ayr	County of Ayr except burghs of Ayr, Irvine, and Kilmarnock	South Ayrshire
Banff	County of Banff except burgh of Banff	Banffshire
Berwick	County of Berwick except burgh of Lauder	Berwickshire
Bute	County of Bute	Buteshire
Caithness	County of Caithness except burgh of Wick	Caithness
Clackmannan and Kinross	County of Clackmannan and county of Kinross	Clackmannanshire and Kinross-shire
Dumbarton	County of Dumbarton except burgh of Dumbarton	Dumbartonshire
Dumfries	County of Dumfries except burghs of Annan, Dumfries, Lochmaben, and Sanquhar	Dumfriesshire
Edinburgh	County of Edinburgh except burghs of Edinburgh, Leith, Portobello and Musselburgh	Edinburghshire
Elgin and Nairn	County of Elgin except burghs of Elgin, Forres, and Cullen and county of Nairn except burgh of Nairn	Elginshire and Nairnshire
Fife	County of Fife except burghs of Anstruther Easter, Anstruther Wester, Burntisland, Crail, Cupar, Dunfermline, Dysart, Inverkeithing, Kilrenny, Kinghorn, Kirkcaldy, Pittenweem, and St Andrews	Fife
Forfar	County of Forfar except burghs of Arbroath, Brechin, Dundee, Forfar, and Montrose	Forfarshire
Haddington	County of Haddington except burghs of Dunbar, Haddington, and North Berwick	Haddingtonshire
Inverness	County of Inverness except burgh of Inverness	Inverness-shire
Kincardine	County of Kincardine except burgh of Inverbervie	Kincardineshire
Kirkcudbright	County of Kirkcudbright except burgh of Kirkcudbright	Kirkcudbrightshire
Lanark	County of Lanark except burghs of Airdrie, Glasgow, Hamilton, Rutherglen, and Lanark	North Lanarkshire
Lanark	County of Lanark except burghs of Airdrie, Glasgow, Hamilton, Rutherglen, and Lanark	South Lanarkshire
Linlithgow	County of Linlithgow except burghs of Linlithgow and South Queensferry	Linlithgowshire
Orkney and Zetland	County of Orkney except burgh of Kirkwall and county of Zetland	Orkney and Zetland
Peebles and Selkirk	County of Peebles and county of Selkirk except burghs of Galashiels and Selkirk	Peebles and Selkirk
Perth	County of Perth except burghs of Culross and Perth	Perthshire
Renfrew	County of Renfrew except burghs of Greenock, Paisley, Port Glasgow, and Renfrew and county of Selkirk except burghs of Galashiels and Selkirk	Renfrewshire
Ross and Cromarty	County of Ross except burghs of Dingwall, Fortrose, and Tain county of Cromarty except burgh of Cromarty	Ross and Cromarty
Roxburgh	County of Roxburgh except burghs of Hawick and Jedburgh	Roxburghshire
Stirling	County of Stirling except burghs of Falkirk and Stirling	Stirlingshire
Sutherland	County of Sutherland except burgh of Dornoch	Sutherland
Wigtown	County of Wigtown except burghs of New Galloway, Stranraer, Wigtown, and Whithorn	Wigtownshire

== University constituencies ==
Constituency	Contents
Edinburgh and St Andrews Universities	Universities of Edinburgh and St Andrews
Glasgow and Aberdeen Universities	Universities of Glasgow and Aberdeen

== See also ==
- List of UK constituencies
