= Scottish Westminster constituencies 2005 to 2024 =

Overview
1708 to 1832
1832 to 1868
1868 to 1885
1885 to 1918
1918 to 1950
1950 to 1955
1955 to 1974
1974 to 1983
1983 to 1997
1997 to 2005
2005 to 2024
since 2024

As a result of the Fifth Periodical Review of the Boundary Commission for Scotland, Scotland was covered by 59 constituencies of the House of Commons of the United Kingdom Parliament: 19 burgh constituencies and 40 county constituencies. These constituencies were used from the 2005 to the 2019 general elections, and were replaced by new constituencies at the 2024 election.

Name	Boundaries
1. Aberdeen North BC; 2. Aberdeen South BC; 3. Airdrie and Shotts CC*; 4. Angus CC; 5. Argyll and Bute CC; 6. Ayr, Carrick and Cumnock CC; 7. Banff and Buchan CC; 8. Berwickshire, Roxburgh and Selkirk CC; 9. Caithness, Sutherland and Easter Ross CC; 10. Central Ayrshire CC*; 11. Coatbridge, Chryston and Bellshill BC*; 12. Cumbernauld, Kilsyth and Kirkintilloch East CC*; 13. Dumfries and Galloway CC; 14. Dumfriesshire, Clydesdale and Tweeddale CC; 15. Dundee East BC; 16. Dundee West BC; 17. Dunfermline and West Fife CC; 18. East Dunbartonshire CC*; 19. East Kilbride, Strathaven and Lesmahagow CC*; 20. East Lothian CC; 21. East Renfrewshire CC*; 22. Edinburgh East BC*; 23. Edinburgh North and Leith BC*; 24. Edinburgh South BC*; 25. Edinburgh South West BC*; 26. Edinburgh West BC*; 27. Falkirk CC*; 28. Glasgow Central BC*; 29. Glasgow East BC*; 30. Glasgow North BC*; 31. Glasgow North East BC*; 32. Glasgow North West BC*; 33. Glasgow South BC*; 34. Glasgow South West BC*; 35. Glenrothes CC*; 36. Gordon CC; 37. Inverclyde CC*; 38. Inverness, Nairn, Badenoch and Strathspey CC; 39. Kilmarnock and Loudoun CC*; 40. Kirkcaldy and Cowdenbeath CC*; 41. Lanark and Hamilton East CC*; 42. Linlithgow and East Falkirk CC*; 43. Livingston CC*; 44. Midlothian CC*; 45. Moray CC; 46. Motherwell and Wishaw BC*; 47. Na h-Eileanan an Iar CC; 48. North Ayrshire and Arran CC; 49. North East Fife CC; 50. Ochil and South Perthshire CC; 51. Orkney and Shetland CC; 52. Paisley and Renfrewshire North CC*; 53. Paisley and Renfrewshire South CC*; 54. Perth and North Perthshire CC; 55. Ross, Skye and Lochaber CC; 56. Rutherglen and Hamilton West BC *; 57. Stirling CC; 58. West Aberdeenshire and Kincardine CC; 59. West Dunbartonshire CC*	Parliamentary constituencies in Scotland

== Constituencies and council areas ==
The Fifth Review of the Boundary Commission for Scotland related the boundaries of new constituencies to those of Scottish local government council areas and to local government wards. Apart from a few minor adjustments, the council area boundaries dated from 1996 and the ward boundaries dated from 1999. Some council areas were grouped to form larger areas and, within these larger areas, some constituencies straddle council area boundaries.

The same council area and ward boundaries were in use when the new constituencies were first used in 2005, but ward boundaries have changed since then. New wards were introduced for the 2007 Scottish local government elections.

Council areas	Constituencies
Aberdeen and Aberdeenshire	Aberdeen North; Aberdeen South; Banff and Buchan; Gordon; West Aberdeenshire and Kincardine
Angus and Dundee	Angus; Dundee East; Dundee West
Argyll and Bute	Argyll and Bute
Edinburgh	Edinburgh East; Edinburgh North and Leith; Edinburgh South; Edinburgh South West; Edinburgh West
Clackmannanshire and Perth and Kinross	Ochil and South Perthshire; Perth and North Perthshire
Dumfries and Galloway, Scottish Borders and South Lanarkshire	Berwickshire, Roxburgh and Selkirk; Dumfries and Galloway; Dumfriesshire, Clydesdale and Tweeddale; East Kilbride, Strathaven and Lesmahagow; Lanark and Hamilton East; Rutherglen and Hamilton West
East Ayrshire, North Ayrshire and South Ayrshire	Ayr, Carrick and Cumnock; Central Ayrshire; Kilmarnock and Loudoun; North Ayrshire and Arran
East Dunbartonshire and North Lanarkshire	Airdrie and Shotts; Coatbridge, Chryston and Bellshill; Cumbernauld, Kilsyth and Kirkintilloch East; East Dunbartonshire; Motherwell and Wishaw
East Lothian	East Lothian
East Renfrewshire	East Renfrewshire
Falkirk and West Lothian	Falkirk; Linlithgow and East Falkirk; Livingston
Fife	Dunfermline and West Fife; Glenrothes; Kirkcaldy and Cowdenbeath; North East Fife
Glasgow	Glasgow Central; Glasgow East; Glasgow North; Glasgow North East; Glasgow North West; Glasgow South; Glasgow South West
Highland	Caithness, Sutherland and Easter Ross; Inverness, Nairn, Badenoch and Strathspey; Ross, Skye and Lochaber
Inverclyde	Inverclyde
Midlothian	Midlothian
Moray	Moray
Na h-Eileanan Siar	Na h-Eileanan an Iar
Orkney Islands and Shetland Islands	Orkney and Shetland
Renfrewshire	Paisley and Renfrewshire North; Paisley and Renfrewshire South
Stirling	Stirling
West Dunbartonshire	West Dunbartonshire

== MPs ==
The following section relates to MPs at the dissolution of Parliament on 30 May 2024.

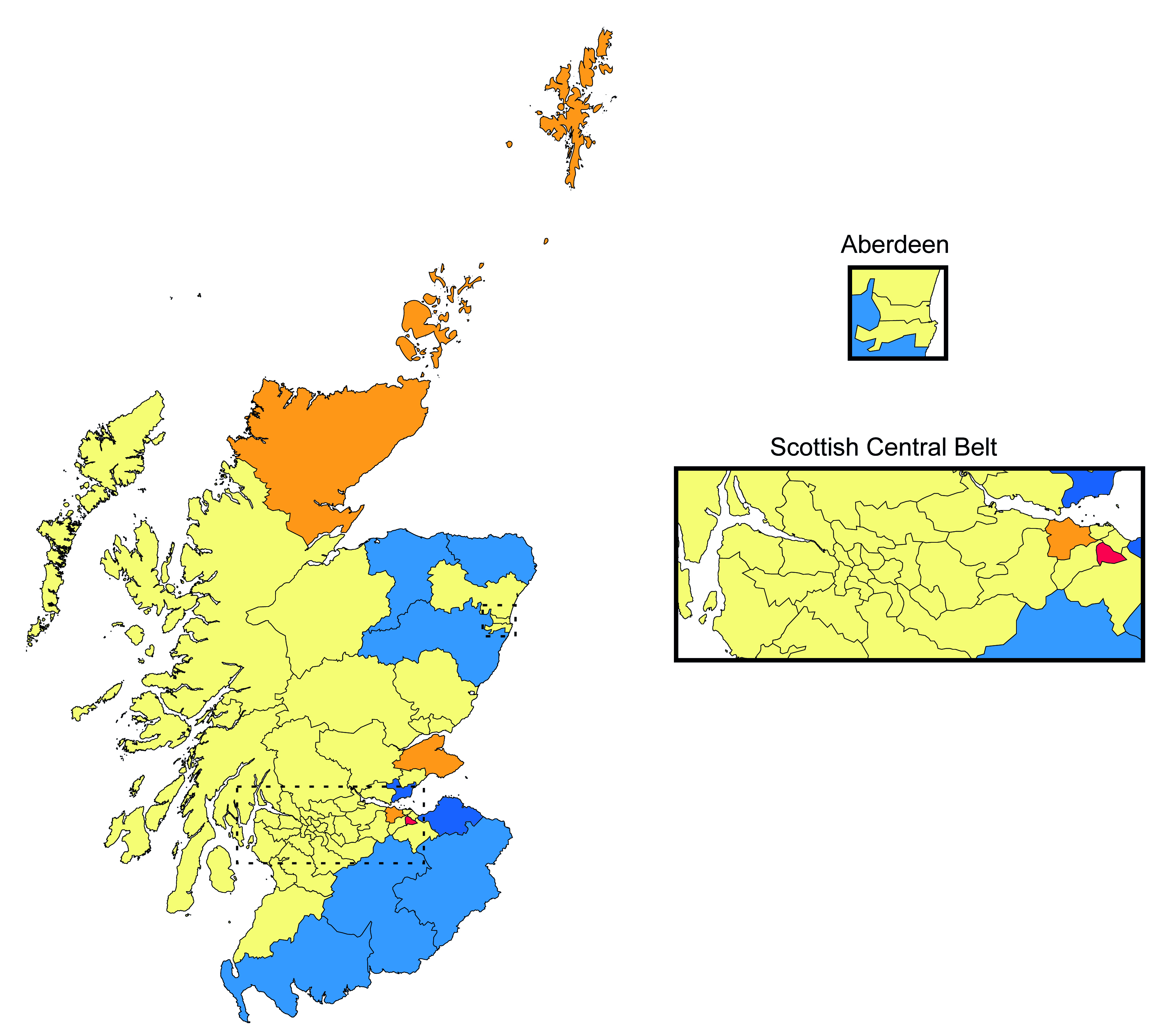

Scottish National Party Conservative Labour Liberal Democrats Alba

Name	Electorate	Majority	Member of Parliament	Nearest opposition
Aberdeen North BC	62,489	12,670	Kirsty Blackman	Ryan Houghton
Aberdeen South BC	65,719	3,990	Stephen Flynn	Douglas Lumsden
Airdrie and Shotts CC	64,011	1,757	Anum Qaisar	Kenneth Stevenson
Angus CC	63,952	3,795	Dave Doogan	Kirstene Hair
Argyll and Bute CC	66,525	4,110	Brendan O'Hara	Gary Mulvaney
Ayr, Carrick and Cumnock CC	71,970	2,329	Allan Dorans	Martin Dowey
Banff and Buchan CC	66,655	4,118	David Duguid	Paul Robertson
Berwickshire, Roxburgh and Selkirk CC	74,518	5,148	John Lamont	Calum Kerr
Caithness, Sutherland and Easter Ross CC	46,930	204	Jamie Stone	Karl Rosie
Central Ayrshire CC	69,742	5,304	Philippa Whitford	Derek Stillie
Coatbridge, Chryston and Bellshill BC	72,943	5,624	Steven Bonnar	Hugh Gaffney
Cumbernauld, Kilsyth and Kirkintilloch East CC	66,079	12,976	Stuart McDonald	James McPhilemy
Dumfries and Galloway CC	74,580	1,805	Alister Jack	Richard Arkless
Dumfriesshire, Clydesdale and Tweeddale CC	68,330	3,781	David Mundell	Amanda Burgauer
Dundee East BC	66,210	13,375	Stewart Hosie	Phillip Scott
Dundee West BC	64,431	12,259	Chris Law	Jim Malone
Dunfermline and West Fife CC	76,652	10,669	Douglas Chapman	Cara Hilton
East Dunbartonshire CC	66,075	149	Amy Callaghan	Jo Swinson
East Kilbride, Strathaven and Lesmahagow CC	81,224	13,322	Lisa Cameron (Note: Cameron defected to the Scottish Conservatives from the SNP on 12 October 2023.)	Monique McAdams
East Lothian CC	81,600	3,886	Kenny MacAskill (Note: MacAskill defected to the Alba Party from the SNP on 27 March 2021.)	Martin Whitfield
East Renfrewshire CC	72,232	5,425	Kirsten Oswald	Paul Masterton
Edinburgh East BC	69,424	10,417	Tommy Sheppard	Sheila Gilmore
Edinburgh North and Leith BC	81,336	12,808	Deidre Brock	Gordon Munro
Edinburgh South BC	66,188	11,095	Ian Murray	Catriona McDonald
Edinburgh South West BC	73,501	11,982	Joanna Cherry	Callum Laidlaw
Edinburgh West BC	72,507	3,769	Christine Jardine	Sarah Masson
Falkirk CC	84,472	14,948	John McNally	Lynn Munro
Glasgow Central BC	69,230	6,474	Alison Thewliss	Faten Hameed
Glasgow East BC	67,381	5,556	David Linden	Kate Watson
Glasgow North BC	57,130	5,601	Patrick Grady	Pam Duncan-Glancy
Glasgow North East BC	61,075	2,458	Anne McLaughlin	Paul Sweeney
Glasgow North West BC	63,402	8,359	Carol Monaghan	Patricia Ferguson
Glasgow South BC	70,891	9,005	Stewart McDonald	Johann Lamont
Glasgow South West BC	64,575	4,900	Chris Stephens	Matt Kerr
Glenrothes CC	65,762	11,757	Peter Grant	Pat Egan
Gordon CC	79,629	819	Richard Thomson	Colin Clark
Inverclyde CC	60,622	7,512	Ronnie Cowan	Martin McCluskey
Inverness, Nairn, Badenoch and Strathspey CC	78,059	10,440	Drew Hendry	Fiona Fawcett
Kilmarnock and Loudoun CC	74,517	12,659	Alan Brown	Caroline Hollins
Kirkcaldy and Cowdenbeath CC	72,853	1,243	Neale Hanvey (Note: Hanvey defected to the Alba Party from the SNP on 27 March 2021.)	Lesley Laird
Lanark and Hamilton East CC	77,659	5,187	Angela Crawley	Shona Haslam
Linlithgow and East Falkirk CC	87,044	11,266	Martyn Day	Charles Kennedy
Livingston CC	82,285	13,435	Hannah Bardell	Damian Timson
Midlothian CC	70,544	5,705	Owen Thompson	Danielle Rowley
Moray CC	71,035	413	Douglas Ross	Laura Mitchell
Motherwell and Wishaw BC	68,856	6,268	Marion Fellows	Angela Feeney
Na h-Eileanan an Iar CC	21,106	2,538	Angus MacNeil (Note: MacNeil was suspended from the SNP in July 2023 and expelled in August.)	Alison McCorquodale
North Ayrshire and Arran	73,534	8,521	Patricia Gibson	David Rocks
North East Fife CC	60,905	1,316	Wendy Chamberlain	Stephen Gethins
Ochil and South Perthshire CC	78,776	4,498	John Nicolson	Luke Graham
Orkney and Shetland CC	34,211	2,507	Alistair Carmichael	Robert Leslie
Paisley and Renfrewshire North CC	72,007	11,902	Gavin Newlands	Alison Taylor
Paisley and Renfrewshire South CC	64,385	10,679	Mhairi Black	Moira Ramage
Perth and North Perthshire CC	72,600	7,550	Pete Wishart	Angus Forbes
Ross, Skye and Lochaber CC	54,230	9,443	Ian Blackford	Craig Harrow
Rutherglen and Hamilton West BC	80,918	9,446	Michael Shanks	Katy Loudon
Stirling CC	68,473	9,254	Alyn Smith	Stephen Kerr
West Aberdeenshire and Kincardine CC	72,640	843	Andrew Bowie	Fergus Mutch
West Dunbartonshire CC	66,517	9,553	Martin Docherty-Hughes	Jean-Anne Mitchell

=== List of constituencies by party ===
Party	Constituency
Alba	East Lothian; Kirkcaldy and Cowdenbeath
Conservative	Banff and Buchan; Berwickshire, Roxburgh and Selkirk; Dumfries and Galloway; Dumfriesshire, Clydesdale and Tweeddale; East Kilbride, Strathaven and Lesmahagow; Moray; West Aberdeenshire and Kincardine
Labour	Edinburgh South; Rutherglen and Hamilton West
Liberal Democrats	Caithness, Sutherland and Easter Ross; Edinburgh West; North East Fife; Orkney and Shetland
SNP	Aberdeen North; Aberdeen South; Airdrie and Shotts; Angus; Argyll and Bute; Ayr, Carrick and Cumnock; Central Ayrshire; Coatbridge, Chryston and Bellshill; Cumbernauld, Kilsyth and Kirkintilloch East; Dundee East; Dundee West; Dunfermline and West Fife; East Dunbartonshire; East Renfrewshire; Edinburgh East; Edinburgh North and Leith; Edinburgh South West; Falkirk; Glasgow Central; Glasgow East; Glasgow North; Glasgow North East; Glasgow North West; Glasgow South; Glasgow South West; Glenrothes; Gordon; Inverclyde; Inverness, Nairn, Badenoch and Strathspey; Kilmarnock and Loudoun; Lanark and Hamilton East; Linlithgow and East Falkirk; Livingston; Midlothian; Motherwell and Wishaw; North Ayrshire and Arran; Ochil and South Perthshire; Paisley and Renfrewshire North; Paisley and Renfrewshire South; Perth and North Perthshire; Ross, Skye and Lochaber; Stirling; West Dunbartonshire
Independent	Na h-Eileanan an Iar

== 2019 general election ==
The aggregate votes of all Scottish constituencies for the 2019 general election are as follows:

Party	Votes	%	Change from 2017	Seats	Change from 2017
Scottish National Party	1,242,380	45.0%	▲8.1%	48	▲13
Conservative	692,939	25.1%	▼3.5%	6	▼7
Labour	511,838	18.6%	▼8.5%	1	▼6
Liberal Democrats	263,417	9.5%	▲2.7%	4	0
Greens	28,122	1.0%	▲0.8%	0	0
Brexit	13,243	0.5%	new	0	0
Others	7,122	0.3%	▼0.4%	0	0
Total	2,759,061	100.0		59	

== See also ==
- List of Great Britain and UK Parliament constituencies in Scotland from 1707 for graphical representation by party
- Scottish Parliament constituencies and electoral regions for seats in the Scottish Parliament
- Scottish Westminster constituencies 1918 to 1950
