= Scottish Westminster constituencies 1997 to 2005 =

Overview
1708 to 1832
1832 to 1868
1868 to 1885
1885 to 1918
1918 to 1950
1950 to 1955
1955 to 1974
1974 to 1983
1983 to 1997
1997 to 2005
2005 to 2024
since 2024

The results of the Fourth Periodical Review of the Boundary Commission for Scotland became effective, as a result of Order in Council SI 1995 No 1037 (S.90), for the 1997 general election of the House of Commons of the Parliament of the United Kingdom (Westminster).

The review defined 28 burgh constituencies (BCs) and 44 county constituencies (CCs), with each electing one Member of Parliament (MP) by the first past the post system of election. Therefore, Scotland had 72 parliamentary seats.

Scottish Westminster constituencies, 1997–2005.

The new constituencies were defined in reference to the boundaries of local government regions and districts and islands areas effective on 1 June 1994, and each constituency was entirely within a region or a grouping of two or entirely within an islands area or a grouping of two. However, under the Local Government etc (Scotland) Act 1994, the regions and districts were abolished in favour of new council areas in 1996, the year before the new constituencies were first used in an election.

1997 boundaries were used also in the 2001 general election.

The results of the Fifth Periodical Review, defining new constituencies in reference to the new council areas, became effective for the 2005 general election.

== Regions ==
Region or regions	Districts	Constituency or constituencies	Contents of constituency
Borders and Lothian	Berwickshire Ettrick and Lauderdale Roxburgh and Tweeddale in Borders and City of Edinburgh and East Lothian in Lothian	Edinburgh Central BC	In City of Edinburgh district, Lothian: Murrayfield/Dean (17), Moat/Stenhouse (23), Dalry/Shandon (24), Fountainbridge/Tollcross (25) and St Giles'/Holyrood (26) regional electoral districts
Borders and Lothian	Berwickshire Ettrick and Lauderdale Roxburgh and Tweeddale in Borders and City of Edinburgh and East Lothian in Lothian	Edinburgh East and Musselburgh BC	In City of Edinburgh district, Lothian: Meadowbank/Mountcastle (27), Links/Restalrig (28), Portobello/Milton (29) and Craigmillar/Duddingston (38) regional electoral districts In East Lothian district, Lothian: Musselburgh/Fisherrow (44) regional electoral division
Borders and Lothian	Berwickshire Ettrick and Lauderdale Roxburgh and Tweeddale in Borders and City of Edinburgh and East Lothian in Lothian	Edinburgh North and Leith BC	In City of Edinburgh district, Lothian: Granton/Pilton (14), Trinity/Newhaven (15), New Town/Stockbridge (18), Carlton/Broughton (19) and Lorne/Harbour (20) regional electoral divisions
Borders and Lothian	Berwickshire Ettrick and Lauderdale Roxburgh and Tweeddale in Borders and City of Edinburgh and East Lothian in Lothian	Edinburgh Pentlands BC	In City of Edinburgh district, Lothian: Balerno/Baberton (10), Longstone/Craiglockhart (22), Sighthill/Broomhouse (30), Colinton/Firrhill (31) and Braidburn/Fairmilehead (35) regional electoral districts
Borders and Lothian	Berwickshire Ettrick and Lauderdale Roxburgh and Tweeddale in Borders and City of Edinburgh and East Lothian in Lothian	Edinburgh South BC	In City of Edinburgh district, Lothian: Merchiston/Morningside (32), Sciennes/Marchmount (33), Prestonfield/Mayfield (34), Alnwickhill/Kaimes (36) and Inch/Gilmerton (37) regional electoral districts
Borders and Lothian	Berwickshire Ettrick and Lauderdale Roxburgh and Tweeddale in Borders and City of Edinburgh and East Lothian in Lothian	Edinburgh West BC	In City of Edinburgh district, Lothian: Queensferry/Kirkliston (11), Cramond/Blackhall (12), Drylaw/Muirhouse (13), Corstorphine North (16) and Corstorphine South (21) regional electoral districts
Borders and Lothian	Berwickshire Ettrick and Lauderdale Roxburgh and Tweeddale in Borders and City of Edinburgh and East Lothian in Lothian	East Lothian CC	In East Lothian district, Lothian: Preston/Levenhall (45), Fa'side (46), Luffness (47), Haddington (48) and Tantallon (49) regional electoral divisions
Borders and Lothian	Berwickshire Ettrick and Lauderdale Roxburgh and Tweeddale in Borders and City of Edinburgh and East Lothian in Lothian	Midlothian CC	In Midlothian district, Lothian: Loanhead (40), Bonnyrigg/Newtongrange (41), Dalkeith (42) and Mayfield/Gorebridge (43) regional electoral divisions
Borders and Lothian	Berwickshire Ettrick and Lauderdale Roxburgh and Tweeddale in Borders and City of Edinburgh and East Lothian in Lothian	Roxburgh and Berwickshire	Berwickshire district, Borders; Roxburgh district, Borders; In Ettrick and Lauderdale district, Borders: Scott's View (7) regional electoral district
Borders and Lothian	Berwickshire Ettrick and Lauderdale Roxburgh and Tweeddale in Borders and City of Edinburgh and East Lothian in Lothian	Tweeddale, Ettrick and Lauderdale	Tweeddale district, Borders; In Ettrick and Lauderdale district, Borders: Old Selkirk (5), Forest (6), Leaderdale (8), Eildon (9), Galawater (10), Galasheils West (11), Galasheils East (12) and Galasheils South (13) regional electoral divisions In Midlothian district, Lothian: Penicuik (39) regional electoral division
Borders and Lothian	West Lothian in Lothian	Linlithgow CC	Linlithgow/Winchburgh (1), Bathgate West/Armadale (2), Whitburn (3) and Bathgate East/Blackburn (4) regional electoral districts
Borders and Lothian	West Lothian in Lothian	Livingston CC	Deans/Knightsridge (5), Craigshill/Ladywell (6), Dedridge/West Calder (7), Broxburn/Uphall (8) and Muriston/East Calder (9) regional electoral districts
Central and Tayside	Clackmannan and Stirling in Central and Angus City of Dundee and Perth and Kinross in Tayside	Dundee East BC	In City of Dundee district, Tayside: Dens (16), Stannergate (17), Clepington (23), Kingsway East (24), Fintry (25), Whitfield (26), Douglas & Angus (27), Broughty Ferry (28) and Barnhill (29) regional electoral divisions
Central and Tayside	Clackmannan and Stirling in Central and Angus City of Dundee and Perth and Kinross in Tayside	Dundee West BC	In City of Dundee district, Tayside: Central (12), Riverside (13), Lochee (14), Law (15), Ninewells (18), Charleston (19), Kingsway West (20), St Mary's (21) and Kirkton (22) regional electoral districts
Central and Tayside	Clackmannan and Stirling in Central and Angus City of Dundee and Perth and Kinross in Tayside	Angus CC	In Angus district, Tayside: Arbroath Central (1), Carnoustie East and Arbroath West (2), Arbroath North and Central Angus (3), Arbroath East (4), Carnoustie West (5), Montrose South (8) and Montrose North (9) regional electoral districts In City of Dundee district, Tayside: Monifieth (30) and Sidlaw (31) regional electoral districts
Central and Tayside	Clackmannan and Stirling in Central and Angus City of Dundee and Perth and Kinross in Tayside	North Tayside CC	In Angus district, Tayside: Forfar West (6), Forfar East (7), Kirriemuir and Western Glens (10) and Brechin and Eastern Glens (11) regional electoral districts In Perth and Kinross district, Tayside: Pitlochry, Aberfeldy and Rannoch (41), Dunkeld and Strathtay (42), Blairgowrie and Glenshee (43), Alyth and Couper Angus (44) and Scone and St Martins (45) regional electoral divisions
Central and Tayside	Clackmannan and Stirling in Central and Angus City of Dundee and Perth and Kinross in Tayside	Ochil CC	Clackmannan district, Central; In Perth and Kinross district, Tayside: Kinross (46) regional electoral division In Stirling district, Tayside: Carseland (13) and Airthrey (15) regional electoral divisions
Central and Tayside	Clackmannan and Stirling in Central and Angus City of Dundee and Perth and Kinross in Tayside	Perth CC	In Perth and Kinross district, Tayside: Perth St Johnstoun (32), Perth Moncreiffe (33), Perth Viewlands (34), Perth Letham (35), Perth Inveralmond (36), Bridge of Earn and the Carse (37), Glenfarg, Methven and Strathearn (38), Auchterarder (39) and Crieff (40) regional electoral districts
Central and Tayside	Clackmannan and Stirling in Central and Angus City of Dundee and Perth and Kinross in Tayside	Stirling CC	In Stirling district, Central: Wallace (7), Castle (8), Viewforth (9), St Ninians (10), Queensland (11), Strathendrick (12), Bannockburn (14), Dounebraes (16) and Menteith (17) regional electoral divisions
Central and Tayside	Falkirk in Central	Falkirk East CC	Dundas (23), Kalantyre (24), Sealock (25), Carriden (26), Kinneil (27), Kinnaird (30), Braes (33), Laurmont (34) and Avonside (35) regional electoral districts
Central and Tayside	Falkirk in Central	Falkirk West CC	Callendar (18), Grahamsdyke (19), Bainsford (20), Glenfuir (21), Carmuirs (22), Herbertshire (28), Tryst (29), Carronglen (31) and Bonnybridge (32) regional electoral divisions
Dumfries and Galloway	Annandale and Eskdale Nithsdale Stewartry and Wigtown	Dumfries CC	Annandale and Eskdale district In Nithsdale district: Locharbriggs (17), Tinwald Downs (18), Lochar (19), Crichton (20), Maryfield (21), St Marys (22), Rotchell (23), Palmerston (24), Maryholm (25) and Lochside (26) regional electoral districts
Dumfries and Galloway	Annandale and Eskdale Nithsdale Stewartry and Wigtown	Galloway and Upper Nithsdale CC	Stewartry district Wigtown district In Nithsdale district: Upper Nithsdale (14), Queensberry (15) and West Nithsdale (16) regional electoral districts
Fife	Dunfermline and Kirkcaldy	Central Fife CC	In Kirkcaldy district: Methil, Denbeath & Muiredge (10), Methilhill and Mountfleurie (11), Leven (12), Kennoway and Windygates (13), Markinch, Pitcoudie and Star (14), Auchmuty, Woodside and Coaltown of Balgonie (15) Pitleuchar and Stenton (16), Rimbleton and South Parks (17), Glenwood and Newcastle (18) and Leslie and Collydean (19) regional electoral districts
Fife	Dunfermline and Kirkcaldy	Dunfermline East CC	In Dunfermline district: Kelty (35), Rosyth East and South (40), Benarty and Lumphinnans (41), Lochgelly (42), Cowdenbeath (43), Aberdour and Moss-side (44), Dalgety Bay (45) and Inverkeithing and North Queensferry (46) regional electoral divisions In Kirkcaldy district: Cardenden and Kinglassie (20) regional electoral district
Fife	Dunfermline and Kirkcaldy	Dunfermline West CC	In Dunfermline district: Kincardine and Valleyfield (30), Cairnyhill, Oakley and Saline (31), Dunfermline North West (32). Dunfermline Central and Crossford (33), Limekilns and Rosyth West (34), Townhill and Halbeath (36), Dunfermline, Woodmill and Linburn (38), Dunfermline, Woodmill and Lisburn (38) and Dunfermline Pitcorthie (39) regional electoral districts
Fife	Dunfermline and Kirkcaldy	Kirkcaldy CC	In Kirkcaldy district: Burntisland and Auchtertool (1), Kinghorn and Linktown (2), Dunearn and Torbain (3), Dunnikier and Fair Isle (4), Raith and Valley (5), Hayfield and Bennochy (6), Pathhead, Sinclairtown and Smeaton (7), Dysart and Gallatown (8) and Buckhaven, Thornton and Wemyss (9) regional electoral districts
Fife	North East Fife	North East Fife CC	District
Grampian	Banff and Buchan Kincardine and Deeside Gordon and Moray	Banff and Buchan CC	In Banff and Buchan district: Deveron (10), Banff and Portsoy (11), Mid Buchan (13), Peterhead South (14), Peterhead North (15), Fraserburgh North (16), Fraserburgh South (17) and Ugie, Cruden and Beddam (18) regional electoral districts
Grampian	Banff and Buchan Kincardine and Deeside Gordon and Moray	Gordon CC	In Banff and Buchan district: Lower Deveron and Upper Ythan (12) regional electoral division In Gordon district: West Gordon (19), Kintore and Newmachar (22), Inverurie (23), Garioch (24), East Gordon (25) and Formartine (26) regional electoral divisions In Moray district: Keith-Strathisla (8) regional electoral district
Grampian	Banff and Buchan Kincardine and Deeside Gordon and Moray	Moray CC	In Moray district: Elgin North East (1), Elgin South West (2), Ernedale (3), Innes-Heldon (4), Burghsea (5), Buckie (6), Rathford-Lennox (7) and Speyside-Glenlivet (9) regional electoral divisions
Grampian	Banff and Buchan Kincardine and Deeside Gordon and Moray	West Aberdeenshire and Kincardine CC	Kincardine and Deeside district In Gordon district: Donside (20) and South Gordon (21) regional electoral districts
Grampian	City of Aberdeen	Aberdeen Central BC	In City of Aberdeen district: Woodside (33), St Machar (34), Linksfield (35), Cairncry (37), Rosemount (39), Causewayend (40), Rubislaw (42) and St Nicholas (43) regional electoral divisions
Grampian	City of Aberdeen	Aberdeen North BC	In City of Aberdeen district: West Don (27), Danestone (28), Middleton (29), Balgownie (30), Brimmond (31), Northfield (32), Mastrick (36) and Summerfield (38) regional electoral divisions
Grampian	City of Aberdeen	Aberdeen South BC	In City of Aberdeen district: Hazelhead (41), Peterculter (44), Craigton (45), Auchingell (46), Holburn (47), Ferryhill (48), Torry (49), Kincorth (50) and Nigg (51) regional electoral divisions
Highland	Badenoch and Strathspey Caithness Inverness Lochaber Nairn Ross and Cromarty Skye and Lochalsh and Sutherland	Caithness, Sutherland and Easter Ross CC	Caithness district Sutherland district In Ross and Cromarty district: Invergordon (22), Easter Ross (23) and Tain (24) regional electoral divisions
Highland	Badenoch and Strathspey Caithness Inverness Lochaber Nairn Ross and Cromarty Skye and Lochalsh and Sutherland	Inverness East, Nairn and Lochaber CC	Badenoch and Strathspey district Lochaber district Nairn district In Inverness district: Ness and Muirtown (36), Crown-Raigmore (37), Old Edinburgh (38), Allt na Sgitheach (39), Drummon (40), Hilton (41), Ardesier, Petty and Balloch (42), Inshes (43), Culloden and Smithton (44) and Strathdearn, Strathnairn and Loch Ness East (45) regional electoral divisions
Highland	Badenoch and Strathspey Caithness Inverness Lochaber Nairn Ross and Cromarty Skye and Lochalsh and Sutherland	Ross, Skye and Inverness West CC	Skye and Lochalsh district In Inverness district: Merkinch (33), Caledonian Canal (34), Ballifeary-Columba (35), Aird South (46), Scorguie (47) and Aird North (48) regional electoral divisions In Ross and Cromarty district: Lochbroom (13), Wester Ross (14), Strathconon (15), Dingwall (16), Ord and Conon (17), Black Isle West (18), Black Isle East (19) Ferindonald (20) and Alness and Ardross (21) regional electoral divisions
Strathclyde	Argyll and Bute	Argyll and Bute CC	District
Strathclyde	Bearsden and Milngavie Clydebank Clydesdale Cumnock and Doon Valley Hamilton Kyle and Carrick Monklands Motherwell and Strathkelvin	Airdrie and Shotts BC	In Monklands district: Airdrie North (52) and Airdrie South (53) regional electoral divisions In Motherwell district: Fortissat (57) regional electoral division
Strathclyde	Bearsden and Milngavie Clydebank Clydesdale Cumnock and Doon Valley Hamilton Kyle and Carrick Monklands Motherwell and Strathkelvin	Coatbridge and Chryston BC	In Monklands district: Coatbridge North & East (50) and Coatbridge South (51) regional electoral divisions In Strathkelvin district: Chryston (46) regional electoral division
Strathclyde	Bearsden and Milngavie Clydebank Clydesdale Cumnock and Doon Valley Hamilton Kyle and Carrick Monklands Motherwell and Strathkelvin	Hamilton North and Bellshill BC	In Hamilton district: Bothwell and Hamilton North (61) regional electoral division In Motherwell district: Bellshill and Tannochside (58) and North Calder (59) regional electoral divisions
Strathclyde	Bearsden and Milngavie Clydebank Clydesdale Cumnock and Doon Valley Hamilton Kyle and Carrick Monklands Motherwell and Strathkelvin	Hamilton South BC	In Hamilton district: Blantyre and Burnbank (60), Hamilton West (62) and Hamilton South (63) regional electoral divisions
Strathclyde	Bearsden and Milngavie Clydebank Clydesdale Cumnock and Doon Valley Hamilton Kyle and Carrick Monklands Motherwell and Strathkelvin	Motherwell and Wishaw BC	In Motherwell district: Dalziel (54), Wishaw (55) and Clydevale (56) regional electoral divisions
Strathclyde	Bearsden and Milngavie Clydebank Clydesdale Cumnock and Doon Valley Hamilton Kyle and Carrick Monklands Motherwell and Strathkelvin	Ayr CC	In Kyle and Carrick district: Prestwick and North Ayr (98), Ayr Central (99) and North Kyle (101) regional electoral divisions
Strathclyde	Bearsden and Milngavie Clydebank Clydesdale Cumnock and Doon Valley Hamilton Kyle and Carrick Monklands Motherwell and Strathkelvin	Carrick, Cumnock and Doon Valley CC	Cumnock and Doon Valley district In Kyle and Carrick district: Ayre South, Coylton and Annbank (100) and Carrick (102) regional electoral divisions
Strathclyde	Bearsden and Milngavie Clydebank Clydesdale Cumnock and Doon Valley Hamilton Kyle and Carrick Monklands Motherwell and Strathkelvin	Clydebank and Milngavie CC	Clydebank district In Bearsden and Milngavie district: Milngavie/Kilmardinny (41) regional electoral division
Strathclyde	Bearsden and Milngavie Clydebank Clydesdale Cumnock and Doon Valley Hamilton Kyle and Carrick Monklands Motherwell and Strathkelvin	Clydesdale CC	Clydesdale district In Hamilton district: Larkhall and Stonehouse (64) regional electoral division
Strathclyde	Bearsden and Milngavie Clydebank Clydesdale Cumnock and Doon Valley Hamilton Kyle and Carrick Monklands Motherwell and Strathkelvin	Strathkelvin and Bearsden CC	In Bearsden and Milngavie district: Bearsden (42) regional electoral division In Strathkelvin district: Kirkintilloch (43), Strathkelvin North (44) and Bishopbriggs (45) regional electoral divisions
Strathclyde	City of Glasgow	Glasgow Anniesland BC	Drumchapel/Blairdardie (9), Yoker/Knightswood (10) and Jordanhill/Kelvindale (11) regional electoral divisions
Strathclyde	City of Glasgow	Glasgow Baillieston BC	Greenfield/Barlanark (22), Baillieston/Mount Vernon (24) and Garthamlock/Easterhouse (25) regional electoral divisions
Strathclyde	City of Glasgow	Glasgow Cathcart BC	Carnwadric/Newlands (31), Battlefield/Croftfoot (34) and Castlemilk/Carmunnock (36) regional electoral divisions
Strathclyde	City of Glasgow	Glasgow Govan BC	Govan/Drumoyne (26), Kingston/Pollokshields (27) and Langside/Shawlands (32) regional electoral divisions
Strathclyde	City of Glasgow	Glasgow Kelvin BC	Scotstoun/Broomhill (12), Hyndland/Hillhead (13) and Anderston/City (15) regional electoral divisions
Strathclyde	City of Glasgow	Glasgow Maryhill BC	Woodside/North Kelvinside (14), Milton/Possil (16) and Summerston/Maryhill (17) regional electoral divisions
Strathclyde	City of Glasgow	Glasgow Pollok BC	Hillington/Cardonald (28), Crookston/Mosspark (29) and South Pollok/Arden (30) regional electoral divisions
Strathclyde	City of Glasgow	Glasgow Rutherglen BC	Toryglen/Kings Park (35), Rutherglen/Fernhill (37) and Cambuslang/Halfway (38) regional electoral divisions
Strathclyde	City of Glasgow	Glasgow Shettleston BC	Calton/Dalmarnock (21), Shettleston/Tollcross (23) and Gorbals/Govanhill regional electoral divisions
Strathclyde	City of Glasgow	Glasgow Springburn BC	Carntyne/Robroyston (18), Royston/Dennistoun (19) and Springburn/Barmulloch (20) regional electoral divisions
Strathclyde	Cumbernauld and Kilsyth	Cumbernauld and Kilsyth CC	District
Strathclyde	Cunninghame	Cunninghame North CC	Garnock Valley (91), Saltcoats and Ardrossan (92) and Largs, West Kilbride and Arran (93) regional electoral divisions
Strathclyde	Cunninghame	Cunninghame South CC	Irvine Central (88), Irvine South (89) and Kilwinning and Stevenson (90) regional electoral divisions
Strathclyde	Dumbarton	Dumbarton CC	District
Strathclyde	East Kilbride	East Kilbride CC	District
Strathclyde	Eastwood Inverclyde and Renfrew	Paisley North BC	In Renfrew district: Linwood and Paisley North (75), Paisley Abercorn (78) and Renfrew (81) regional electoral divisions
Strathclyde	Eastwood Inverclyde and Renfrew	Paisley South BC	In Renfrew district: Paisley Gleniffer (76), Paisley Central (77) and Johnstone (80) regional electoral divisions
Strathclyde	Eastwood Inverclyde and Renfrew	Eastwood CC	Eastwood district In Renfrew district: Barrhead (79) regional electoral division
Strathclyde	Eastwood Inverclyde and Renfrew	Greenock and Inverclyde CC	In Inverclyde district: Greenock Central East (85), Greenock South West (86) and Inverclyde West (87) regional electoral divisions
Strathclyde	Eastwood Inverclyde and Renfrew	West Renfrewshire CC	In Inverclyde district: Port Glasgow and Kilmacolm (84) regional electoral division In Renfrew district: Gryffe (82) and Bargarran (83) regional electoral divisions
Strathclyde	Kilmarnock and Loudoun	Kilmarnock and Loudoun CC	District

== Islands areas ==
Islands area or areas	Constituency	Contents of constituency
Orkney and Shetland	Orkney and Shetland	Islands areas
Western Isles	Western Isles	Islands area
