= Scottish Westminster constituencies 1832 to 1868 =

Overview
1708 to 1832
1832 to 1868
1868 to 1885
1885 to 1918
1918 to 1950
1950 to 1955
1955 to 1974
1974 to 1983
1983 to 1997
1997 to 2005
2005 to 2024
since 2024

The Representation of the People (Scotland) Act 1832 redefined the boundaries of Scottish constituencies of the House of Commons of the Parliament of the United Kingdom (at Westminster), and the new boundaries were first used in the 1832 general election.

1832 boundaries were used also in the general elections of 1835, 1837, 1841, 1847, 1852, 1857, 1859 and 1865.

As a result of the legislation, there were 21 burgh constituencies and 30 county constituencies. Except for Edinburgh and Glasgow, which were two-seat constituencies, each Scottish constituency represented a seat for one Member of Parliament (MP). Therefore, Scotland had 53 parliamentary seats.

14 of the burgh constituencies were districts of burghs.

The constituencies related nominally to counties and burghs, but boundaries for parliamentary purposes were not necessarily those for other purposes.

For the 1868 general election, new boundaries were defined by the Representation of the People (Scotland) Act 1868.

== Burgh Constituencies ==
Constituency	Nominal Contents
Aberdeen	In county of Aberdeen: burgh of Aberdeen
Ayr District	In county of Ayr: burghs of Ayr and Irvine; In county of Argyll: burghs of Campbeltown, Inverary, and Oban
Dumfries District	In county of Dumfries: burghs of Annan, Dumfries, Lochmaben, and Sanquhar; In county of Kirkcudbright: burgh of Kirkcudbright
Dundee	In county of Forfar: burgh of Dundee
Edinburgh; Elected two MPs	In county of Edinburgh: burgh of Edinburgh
Elgin District	In county of Aberdeen: burghs of Inverurie, Kintore, and Peterhead; In county of Banff: burghs of Banff (with Macduff) and Cullen; In county of Elgin: burgh of Elgin
Falkirk District	In county of Lanark: burghs of Airdrie, Hamilton, and Lanark; In county of Linlithgow: burgh of Linlithgow; In county of Stirling: burgh of Falkirk
Glasgow; Elected two MPs	In county of Lanark: burgh of Glasgow
Greenock	In county of Renfrew: burgh of Greenock
Haddington District	In county of Berwick: burgh of Lauder; In county of Haddington burghs of Dunbar, Haddington, and North Berwick; In county of Roxburgh: burgh of Jedburgh
Inverness District	In county of Elgin: burgh of Forres; In county of Inverness: burgh of Inverness; In county of Nairn: burgh of Nairn; In county of Ross: burgh of Fortrose
Kilmarnock District	In county of Ayr: burgh of Kilmarnock; In county of Dumbarton: burgh of Dumbarton; In county of Lanark: burgh of Rutherglen; In county of Renfrew: burghs of Port Glasgow and Renfrew
Kirkcaldy District	In county of Fife: burghs of Burntisland, Dysart, Kinghorn, and Kirkcaldy
Leith District	In county of Edinburgh: burghs of Leith, Portobello and Musselburgh
Montrose District	In county of Forfar: burghs of Arbroath, Brechin, Forfar, and Montrose; In county of Kincardine: burgh of Inverbervie
Paisley	In county of Renfrew: burgh of Paisley
Perth	In county of Perth: burgh of Perth
St Andrews District	In county of Fife: burghs of Anstruther Easter, Anstruther Wester, Crail, Cupar, Pittenweem, Kilrenny, and St Andrews
Stirling District	In county of Fife: burghs of Dunfermline and Inverkeithing; In county of Linlithgow: burgh of South Queensferry; In county of Perth: burgh of Culross; In county of Stirling: burgh of Stirling
Wick District	In county of Caithness: burgh of Wick; In county of Cromarty: burgh of Cromarty; In county of Orkney: burgh of Kirkwall; In county of Sutherland: burgh of Dornoch; In county of Ross: burghs of Dingwall and Tain
Wigtown District	In county of Wigtown: burghs of New Galloway, Stranraer, Wigtown, and Whithorn

== County constituencies ==
Constituency	Nominal contents
Aberdeenshire	County of Aberdeen except burghs of Aberdeen, Inverurie, Kintore, and Peterhead
Argyll	County of Argyll except burghs of Campbeltown, Inverary, and Oban
Ayrshire	County of Ayr except burghs of Ayr, Irvine, and Kilmarnock
Banffshire	County of Banff except burghs of Banff (with Macduff) and Cullen
Berwickshire	County of Berwick except burgh of Lauder
Buteshire	County of Bute
Caithness	County of Caithness except burgh of Wick
Clackmannanshire and Kinross-shire	County of Clackmannan and county of Kinross
Dumbartonshire	County of Dumbarton except burgh of Dumbarton
Dumfriesshire	County of Dumfries except burghs of Annan, Dumfries, Lochmaben, and Sanquhar
Edinburghshire	County of Edinburgh except burghs of Edinburgh, Leith, Portobello and Musselburgh
Elginshire and Nairnshire	County of Elgin except burghs of Elgin and Forres and county of Nairn except burgh of Nairn
Fife	County of Fife except burghs of Anstruther Easter, Anstruther Wester, Burntisland, Crail, Cupar, Dunfermline, Dysart, Inverkeithing, Kilrenny, Kinghorn, Kirkcaldy, Pittenweem, and St Andrews
Forfarshire	County of Forfar except burghs of Arbroath, Brechin, Dundee, Forfar, and Montrose
Haddingtonshire	County of Haddington except burghs of Dunbar, Haddington, and North Berwick
Inverness-shire	County of Inverness except burgh of Inverness
Kincardineshire	County of Kincardine except burgh of Inverbervie
Kirkcudbrightshire	County of Kirkcudbright except burgh of Kirkcudbright
Lanarkshire	County of Lanark except burghs of Airdrie, Glasgow, Hamilton, Rutherglen, and Lanark
Linlithgowshire	County of Linlithgow except burghs of Linlithgow and South Queensferry
Orkney and Zetland	County of Orkney except burgh of Kirkwall and county of Zetland
Peeblesshire	County of Peebles
Perthshire	County of Perth except burghs of Culross and Perth
Renfrewshire	County of Renfrew except burghs of Greenock, Paisley, Port Glasgow, and Renfrew
Ross and Cromarty	County of Ross except burghs of Dingwall, Fortrose, and Tain county of Cromarty except burgh of Cromarty
Roxburghshire	County of Roxburgh except burgh of Jedburgh
Selkirkshire	County of Selkirk
Stirlingshire	County of Stirling except burghs of Falkirk and Stirling
Sutherland	County of Sutherland except burgh of Dornoch
Wigtownshire	County of Wigtown except burghs of New Galloway, Stranraer, Wigtown, and Whithorn

== See also ==
- List of UK constituencies
