= County of city =

Type of local government area in Scotland between 1893 and 1975

County of city (or county of a city) was a term used for certain local government areas in Scotland between 1890 and 1975 which performed the functions of both a county council and the town council of a burgh and also served as their own judicial areas. There were four such areas, covering the cities of Aberdeen, Dundee, Edinburgh and Glasgow. Each area was governed by a city corporation (also known as a town council) and was administered independently of the surrounding county. The counties of cities were abolished by the Local Government (Scotland) Act 1973, and were replaced by regions and districts in 1975.

== Formation ==
Scotland's counties (also called shires) were primarily areas for the administration of justice via a sheriff. They gradually also gained local government functions, notably following the creation of Commissioners of Supply for each county in 1667. Local government functions transferred to elected county councils in 1890 under the Local Government (Scotland) Act 1889.

At that time, there were 26 burghs which were excluded from county council control for the purposes of local government. These remained part of their parent county for the purposes of administration of justice, with the exception of Edinburgh, which had been given the right to appoint its own sheriff in 1482. Edinburgh was therefore judicially independent from Midlothian, with the city being described as the "city and county of the city of Edinburgh".

Following the creation of the county councils, there were calls to make some of the other large cities their own counties for judicial purposes as well as local government. Glasgow was subsequently designated as the next county of city in 1893, being named "the county of the city of Glasgow".

Dundee was designated the following year, by the name "the county of the city of Dundee".

Finally, Aberdeen was made a county of a city in 1899, by the name of "the county of the city of Aberdeen".

== Powers ==
In 1930, under the Local Government (Scotland) Act 1929, the county councils were given authority over all burghs except the four which were classed as counties of cities. The councils for each of the four cities therefore performed both burgh functions and county-level functions, including roads, education, police, public health, social services, planning and local taxation.
