= Cumnock and Holmhead =

Police burgh of Ayrshire, Scotland

Cumnock and Holmhead, a police burgh of Ayrshire, Scotland, on the Lugar, 33 3/4 miles (54.3 kilometres) S. of Glasgow by road, with two stations (Cumnock and Old Cumnock) on the Glasgow and South Western Railway. The population in 1971 was 5,715.

== History ==
At the beginning of the 19th century, Cumnock and Holmhead lay in the parish of Old Cumnock (pop. 5144), a police burgh of Ayrshire, Scotland, on the Lugar water, 33¾m. south of Glasgow by road, with two stations close by on the Glasgow and South Western Railway. With a population in 1901 of 3088 it was a thriving town, with a town hall, cottage hospital, public library and an athenaeum. Coal and ironstone were extensively mined in the neighbourhood, and the manufacturers included woolens, tweeds, agricultural implements and pottery.

When Alexander Peden (1626–1686), the persecuted Covenanter, died, he was buried in the Boswell aisle of Auchinleck church; but his corpse was borne thence with every indignity by a company of dragoons to the foot of the gallows at Cumnock, where they intended to hang it in chains. This proving to be impracticable they buried it at the foot of the gallows. After the Revolution the inhabitants out of respect for the Prophet's memory abandoned their then burying-ground and turned the old place of execution into the present cemetery. Five miles SE. lies the parish of New Cumnock (pop. 5367) at the confluence of Afton Water and the Nith.

== Boswell family ==
It is the seat of the Boswell family, three generations of which achieved greatness.

- Lord Auchinleck, the judge (who dubbed Dr Johnson Ursa Major)
- James Boswell, his son. A biographer
- Sir Alexander Boswell, his grandson, the author of Gude nicht and joy be wi you a, Jennys Bawbee, Jenny dang the weaver, and other songs and poems. He perished in a duel.

== Name change ==
Cumnock became a burgh of barony by royal charter in 1509. It became a police burgh, with the name Cumnock and Holmhead, in 1866. Holmhead was removed from the title in 1960.

== See also ==
- Lands of Borland, Barony of Cumnock
