= Strathclyde West (European Parliament constituency) =

Former European Parliament constituency

- European Parliament constituency
- Boundary within Scotland (1979-1984)
- Member state: United Kingdom
- Created: 1979
- Dissolved: 1999
- MEPs: 1

Prior to its uniform adoption of proportional representation in 1999, the United Kingdom used first-past-the-post for the European elections in England, Scotland and Wales. The European Parliament constituencies used under that system were smaller than the later regional constituencies and only had one Member of the European Parliament each. The constituency of Strathclyde West was one of them.

Boundary within Scotland (1984-1999)

== Boundaries ==
1979-1984: Bute and North Ayrshire, Central Dunbartonshire, East Dunbartonshire, East Renfrewshire, Greenock and Port Glasgow, Paisley, West Dunbartonshire, West Renfrewshire.

1984-1999: Clydebank and Milngavie, Cunninghame North, Dumbarton, Eastwood, Greenock and Port Glasgow, Paisley North, Paisley South, Renfrew West and Inverclyde, Strathkelvin and Bearsden.

== Members of the European Parliament ==
Elected	Member	Party
1979	Adam Fergusson	Conservative
1984	Hugh McMahon	Labour
1989	Hugh McMahon	Labour
1994	Hugh McMahon	Labour

== Results ==
European Parliament election, 1979: Strathclyde West
Party	Candidate	Votes	%	±%
Conservative	Adam Fergusson	65,608	37.2	
Labour	Miss V. A. Friel	63,781	36.1	
SNP	C. G. M. Slesser	29,115	16.5	
Liberal	T. R. L. Fraser	17,955	10.2	
Majority		1,827	1.1	
Turnout		176,459	35.6	
Conservative win (new seat)				

European Parliament election, 1984: Strathclyde West
Party	Candidate	Votes	%	±%
Labour	Hugh McMahon	70,234	40.8	+4.7
Conservative	Miss J. A. H. Lait	47,196	27.4	−9.8
SNP	Mrs. Jenny M. Herriot	28,866	16.7	+0.2
SDP	Douglas J. Herbison	25,955	15.1	+4.9
Majority		23,038	13.4	N/A
Turnout		172,251	34.5	
Labour gain from Conservative		Swing		

European Parliament election, 1989: Strathclyde West
Party	Candidate	Votes	%	±%
Labour	Hugh McMahon	89,627	42.7	+1.9
SNP	Colin Campbell	50,036	23.8	+7.1
Conservative	Stephen J. Robin	45,872	21.8	−5.6
Green	George Campbell	16,461	7.8	New
SLD	Douglas J. Herbison	8,098	3.9	−11.2
Majority		39,591	18.9	+5.5
Turnout		210,094	42.6	+8.1
Labour hold		Swing		

European Parliament election, 1994: Strathclyde West
Party	Candidate	Votes	%	±%
Labour	Hugh McMahon	86,957	44.4	+1.7
SNP	Colin Campbell	61,934	31.6	+7.8
Conservative	John P. Godfrey	28,414	14.5	−7.3
Liberal Democrats	Douglas J. Herbison	14,772	7.5	+3.6
Green	Mrs. Kathleen M. Allan	2,886	1.5	−6.3'"`UNIQ−−ref−0000001B−QINU`"'
Natural Law	Mrs. Sarah J. Gilmour	918	0.5	New
Majority		25,023	12.8	−6.1
Turnout		195,881	40.0	−2.6
Labour hold		Swing		
