= Electoral history of Jo Swinson =

List of elections featuring Jo Swinson as a candidate

This is a summary of the electoral history of Jo Swinson, the Leader of the Liberal Democrats from 22 July to 13 December 2019, and a Member of the United Kingdom Parliament from 2005 to 2019, when she lost her seat as MP for East Dunbartonshire in the 2019 General Election and, due to party rules, stepped down from her position as Leader of the Liberal Democrats.

== UK Parliament elections ==
=== 2005 general election ===
General election 2005: East Dunbartonshire
Party	Candidate	Votes	%	±%
Liberal Democrats	Jo Swinson	19,533	41.8	+14.7
Labour	John Lyons	15,472	33.1	−0.2
Conservative	David Jack	7,708	16.5	−6.0
SNP	Chris Sagan	2,716	5.8	−8.9
Green	Stuart Callison	876	1.9	+1.9
Scottish Socialist	Pamela Page	419	0.9	−1.5
Majority		4,061	8.7	
Turnout		46,724	73.1	+10.1
Liberal Democrats gain from Labour		Swing	+7.4	

=== 2010 general election ===
General election 2010: East Dunbartonshire
Party	Candidate	Votes	%	±%
Liberal Democrats	Jo Swinson	18,551	38.7	−3.1
Labour	Mary Galbraith	16,367	34.1	+1.0
Conservative	Mark Nolan	7,431	15.5	−1.0
SNP	Iain White	5,054	10.5	+4.7
UKIP	James Beeley	545	1.1	+1.1
Majority		2,184	4.6	
Turnout		47,948	75.2	+2.1
Liberal Democrats hold		Swing	−2.1	

=== 2015 general election ===
General election 2015: East Dunbartonshire
Party	Candidate	Votes	%	±%
SNP	John Nicolson	22,093	40.3	+29.8
Liberal Democrats	Jo Swinson	19,926	36.3	−2.4
Labour	Amanjit Jhund	6,754	12.3	−21.8
Conservative	Andrew Polson	4,727	8.6	−6.9
Green	Ross Greer	804	1.5	N/A
UKIP	Wilfred Arasaratnam	567	1.0	−0.1
Majority		2,167	4.0	N/A
Turnout		54,871	81.9^{1}	+6.7
SNP gain from Liberal Democrats		Swing	+16.0	

=== 2017 general election ===
General election 2017: East Dunbartonshire
Party	Candidate	Votes	%	±%
Liberal Democrats	Jo Swinson	21,023	40.6	+4.3
SNP	John Nicolson	15,684	30.3	−10.0
Conservative	Sheila Mechan	7,563	14.6	+6.0
Labour	Callum McNally	7,531	14.5	+2.2
Majority		5,339	10.3	N/A
Turnout		51,801	78.8	−3.1
Liberal Democrats gain from SNP		Swing	+7.2	

=== 2019 general election ===
2019 general election: East Dunbartonshire
Party	Candidate	Votes	%	±%
SNP	Amy Callaghan	19,672	37.1	+6.8
Liberal Democrats	Jo Swinson	19,523	36.8	–3.8
Conservative	Pam Gosal	7,455	14.1	–0.5
Labour	Callum McNally	4,839	9.1	–5.4
Green	Carolynn Scrimgeour	916	1.7	N/A
Independent	Rosie Dickson	221	0.4	N/A
UKIP	David Murdo MacKay	208	0.4	N/A
Scottish Family	Liam McKechnie	197	0.4	N/A
Majority		149	0.3	N/A
Turnout		53,031	80.3	+1.5
SNP gain from Liberal Democrats		Swing	+6.8	

== Party elections ==
=== 2017 Liberal Democrats deputy leadership election ===
Following the close of nominations, only Swinson was officially nominated, and was elected unopposed.

=== 2019 Liberal Democrats leadership election ===
Candidate	Votes	%	
✓ Jo Swinson	47,997		62.8
Ed Davey	28,021		36.7
Spoilt ballots	411		0.5
Total	76,429	Turnout	72.1

The electorate numbered 106,075, meaning that 76,429 Liberal Democrat members cast a vote, and 29,646 did not.
