= Lord Kirkwood =

The style Lord Kirkwood has been borne by:

- Baron Kirkwood, a hereditary Peerage of the United Kingdom
  - David Kirkwood, 1st Baron Kirkwood (1872–1955), the first peer in this hereditary line
- Ian Kirkwood, Lord Kirkwood (1932–2017), Scottish lawyer and judge
- Archy Kirkwood, Baron Kirkwood of Kirkhope (born 1946), Liberal Democrat politician
