= Master of Research =

Academic degree

A Master of Research (abbr. MRes, MARes, MScRes, or MScR) degree is an internationally recognised advanced postgraduate research degree in the United Kingdom, Singapore, Australia and Hong Kong. In most cases, the degree is designed to prepare students for doctoral research. Increasingly, the degree may be useful for students considering careers outside of academia, where high-level research skills are valued but a doctoral qualification is not required. The Master of Research may be especially appealing to those in the field of Medicine who wish to develop academic research skills to enter competitive specialities such as surgery or public health.

A Master of Research may be recommended where a student is unsure if they would like to pursue a doctoral program, or if they do not have the qualifications or experience to gain direct entry into a doctoral program. It can provide a useful experience of what doctoral study is like, whilst also allowing the student to acquire a Master's level qualification. In some cases it is also considered a foundation for conducting research in professional contexts. For disciplines that undertake practice-led research, a Master of Research provides an opportunity for understanding the nature and potential of research study through, for example, art and design practice.

At some universities, the degree is conferred in a specific discipline, for example, a Master of Research in Epidemiology or a Master of Science by Research in Cancer Biology.

== United Kingdom ==
Master of Research degrees are increasingly popular with a number of the Russell Group and other elite universities; such as Imperial College London, University College London, University of Bristol, University of Manchester, University of Glasgow, University of East Anglia, University of Edinburgh, Cardiff University, Newcastle University, University of Liverpool, University of Birmingham, University of Southampton, University of York and the University of London; as well as in universities with significant art and design departments, such as the Faculty of Arts (University of Brighton), University of the Arts London, and the Royal College of Art. In most cases, the degree is designed to prepare students for doctoral research. For universities with significant strengths in practice-led research, a research master's degree preparation provides an opportunity for understanding the nature and potential of research study through, for example, art and design practice.

=== Programme structure ===
Research master's degree programmes are different from taught master's degrees by placing particular emphasis on a large dissertation (typically between 35,000 and 40,000 words), or an equivalent practice-led research project, in addition to fewer (or no) taught modules. Research master's degree programme courses in the UK must guarantee that at least 70% of the content is project-based as it is "geared to those wishing to pursue a research career afterwards." This will often include training in Research Methods, as well as instruction in Research Ethics and professional practice issues such as writing proposals, making funding applications and publishing.

=== Award instead of doctoral degree ===
Some universities may award this degree to a doctoral candidate who has not completed the required period of study for a doctorate, but has completed a sufficient dissertation and taught content to be acceptable for an MRes. In some Russell Group universities this degree is awarded to doctoral candidates who embark on the Doctor of Engineering (EngD) programme but choose to pursue a non-academic career before the full Doctor of Engineering programme is complete. In most cases, however, a PhD candidate will step down to the level of a Master of Philosophy at British universities. The main difference between an MRes and an MPhil is that MRes sometimes (but not always) has taught components (although the main focus is still on research) and therefore might require a first year taught component during the doctoral studies, such as modules from an associated Master of Science degree. Research undertaken for a Master of Research degree is typically shorter in duration than that of an MPhil or PhD - around one to two years, as opposed to two or three, full-time. For humanities subjects, MPhil theses are typically 60,000 words (and PhDs 80–100,000), while MRes or MA(Res) are usually around 35–40,000 by thesis, or lesser for courses with a taught component (a mixture of smaller essays and a dissertation). Some universities require an oral exam (viva voce) in addition to a written thesis for successful completion of an MRes degree.

== Australia ==
In Australia, a Master of Research is a postgraduate level research training degree. The program consists of a coursework component and a supervised research project, including a thesis of 20–25,000 words. An MRes is completed within two years, or part-time equivalent. The degree is currently only offered at a limited number of universities, having first being introduced at Macquarie University. Entry into a Master of Research degree program usually only requires a bachelor's degree with a sufficiently high grade point average (GPA), as opposed to Master of Philosophy programs which often require a Master of Research degree or an honours degree (sometimes with grade point average, weighted average mark or other grade-related requirements).

The University of Technology Sydney offers a Master of Research in specific disciplines through its faculties. The university also offers trans-disciplinary research through entities such as Master of Sustainable Futures (Research) provided by the Institute for Sustainable Futures.

A Master of Research may be undertaken as a pathway qualification to a Doctor of Philosophy (PhD), or as training to provide professional research skills.

== See also ==
- Master's degree
  - Master of Philosophy
  - Master of Letters
- Doctor of Philosophy
