= Barry Henderson =

British politician (1936–2025)

James Henderson MP

Member of Parliament for East Dunbartonshire
- In office 28 February 1974 – 20 September 1974
- Preceded by: Hugh McCartney
- Succeeded by: Margaret Ewing

Member of Parliament for North East Fife East Fife (1979–1983)
- In office 3 May 1979 – 18 May 1987
- Preceded by: Sir John Gilmour, 3rd Baronet
- Succeeded by: Menzies Campbell

Personal details
- Born: 29 April 1936 Kirkcaldy, Scotland
- Died: 14 November 2025 (aged 89)
- Party: Conservative
- Education: Stowe School

James Stewart Barry Henderson (29 April 1936 – 14 November 2025) was a British Conservative Party politician who served in the House of Commons on two occasions, February–October 1974 and 1979–87, both for Scottish constituencies.

== Early life and education ==
Henderson was born in Kirkcaldy, Scotland on 29 April 1936. His parents were James Henderson and his wife Jane (formerly McLaren), and he had an older sister, Anne (1931–2018), who later became the first wife of Martin Attlee, 2nd Earl Attlee. (Note: Henderson's Telegraph obituary names his sister as Margaret, but that was the name of Attlee's second wife.) Henderson was educated at Stowe before undertaking his National Service in the Scots Guards between 1954 and 1956. He then worked as a computer systems advisor and at the Scottish Conservative and Unionist Party Central Office.

== Parliamentary career ==
Henderson contested Edinburgh East at the 1966 general election. He was first elected as the Member of Parliament for East Dunbartonshire at the February 1974 general election. Although a constituency of this name had existed before that election, this was in effect a new constituency because of large-scale boundary changes, and the sitting MP Hugh McCartney had moved to Central Dunbartonshire. However, Henderson lost his seat at the October 1974 election, to Margaret Bain of the Scottish National Party, by just 22 votes.

At the 1979 general election, he was returned to Parliament as the MP for East Fife. After boundary changes for the 1983 general election, he was elected for North East Fife, which was largely the same constituency with only limited boundary changes. However, Henderson lost his seat at the 1987 general election to Menzies Campbell of the Liberal Democrats. Campbell would remain as the MP for the constituency until his retirement from the Commons 28 years later in 2015.

== Death ==
Henderson died on 14 November 2025, at the age of 89.

== Sources ==
- Times Guide to the House of Commons June 1987
- Who's Who 2007

Parliament of the United Kingdom
Preceded by Hugh McCartney	Member of Parliament for East Dunbartonshire; Feb. 1974–Oct. 1974	Succeeded by Margaret Bain
Preceded by John Edward Gilmour	Member of Parliament for East Fife; 1979–1983	Constituency abolished
New constituency	Member of Parliament for North East Fife; 1983–1987	Succeeded by Menzies Campbell
