= John McFall, Baron McFall of Alcluith =

British politician (born 1944)

The Right Honourable The Lord McFall of Alcluith PC
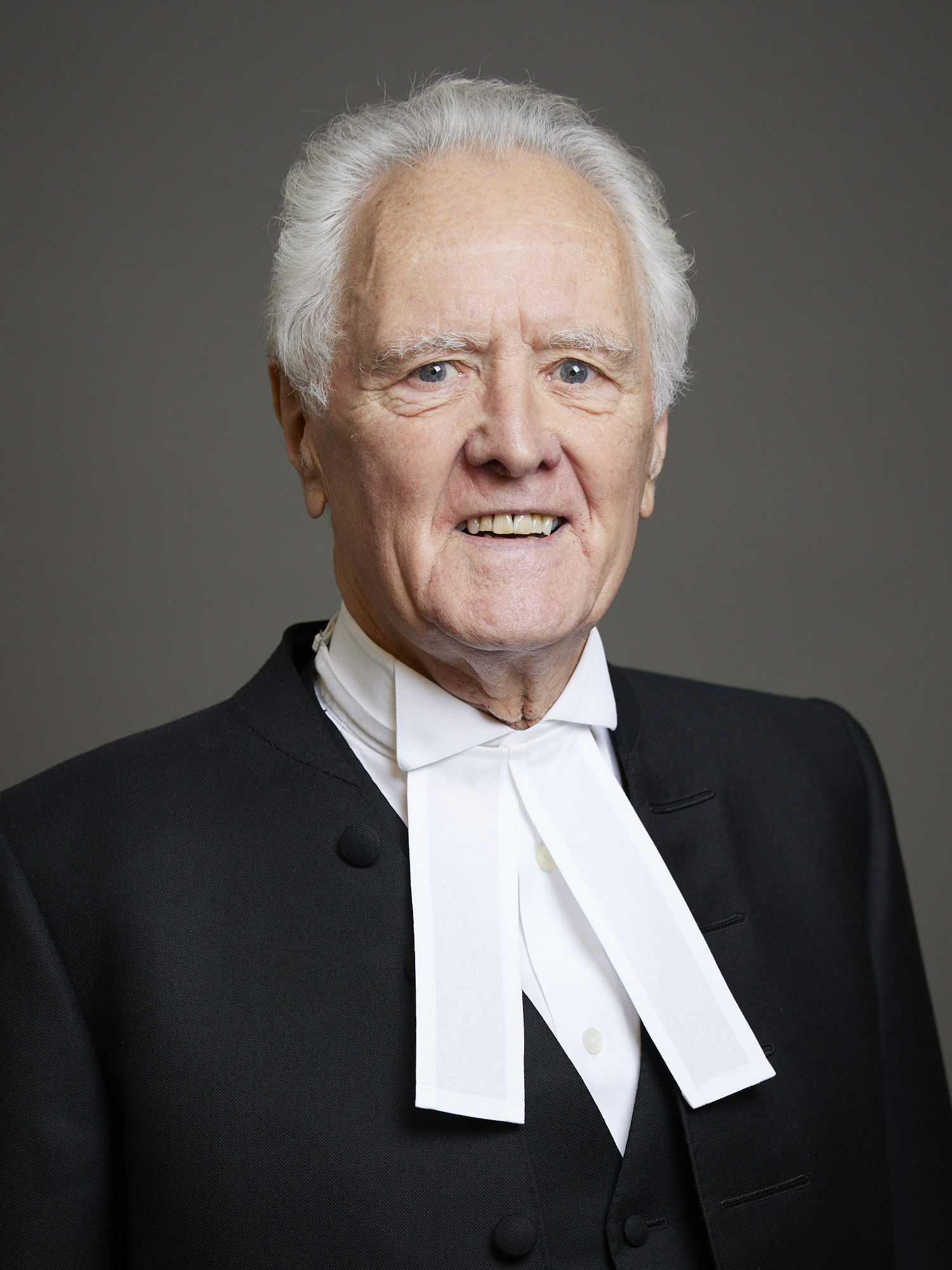
- Official portrait, 2022

Lord Speaker
- In office 1 May 2021 – 2 February 2026
- Monarchs: Elizabeth II; Charles III
- Deputy: John Gardiner
- Preceded by: Norman Fowler
- Succeeded by: The Lord Forsyth of Drumlean

Senior Deputy Speaker of the House of Lords
- In office 1 September 2016 – 30 April 2021
- Lord Speaker: Norman Fowler
- Preceded by: Herbert Laming (as Chairman of Committees)
- Succeeded by: John Gardiner

Chairman of the Treasury Select Committee
- In office 18 July 2001 – 6 May 2010
- Preceded by: Giles Radice
- Succeeded by: Andrew Tyrie

Parliamentary Under-Secretary of State for Northern Ireland
- In office 28 July 1998 – 2 December 1999
- Prime Minister: Tony Blair
- Preceded by: Tony Worthington
- Succeeded by: Vacant

Lord Commissioner of the Treasury
- In office 8 May 1997 – 28 July 1998
- Prime Minister: Tony Blair
- Chancellor: Gordon Brown
- Preceded by: Bowen Wells
- Succeeded by: Jane Kennedy

Member of the House of Lords
- Lord Temporal
- Life peerage 17 June 2010

Member of Parliament for West Dunbartonshire Dumbarton (1987–2005)
- In office 11 June 1987 – 12 April 2010
- Preceded by: Ian Campbell
- Succeeded by: Gemma Doyle

Personal details
- Born: 4 October 1944 (age 81) Glasgow, Scotland
- Party: Crossbench (since 2026)
- Other political affiliations: Labour Co-op (until 2016); Non-affiliated (2016–2021); None (Lord Speaker) (2021–2026)
- Spouse: Joan Ward
- Children: 4
- Education: University of Strathclyde; Open University

John Francis McFall, Baron McFall of Alcluith, (born 4 October 1944), is a Scottish politician and life peer who was Lord Speaker, the presiding officer of the House of Lords, from 2021 to 2026. He was a member of Parliament for the Labour and Co-operative Party from 1987 to 2010, first for Dumbarton and then from 2005 for West Dunbartonshire. He was also Chairman of the House of Commons Treasury Committee. Following his appointment to the House of Lords, McFall was Senior Deputy Speaker from 2016 to 2021 before succeeding Lord Fowler as Lord Speaker.

== Early life ==
McFall went to a boys' school, St Patrick's Secondary School (since merged with Notre Dame High School to form Our Lady & St Patrick's High School), on Hawthornhill Road in Castlehill, Dumbarton, leaving without any qualifications at 15. His father was a school caretaker and his mother had a newsagents shop, which sparked his (later) interest in how to run businesses. He worked for the local Parks Department in Dumbarton and then in a factory.

At the age of 24, he studied at Paisley College of Technology (now the University of the West of Scotland) receiving a BSc in chemistry. In 1977, he wanted to widen his knowledge away from science and obtained a BA from the Open University in education and philosophy. He was a chemistry and maths teacher from 1974 to 1987 in Dumbarton, Kirkintilloch and Glasgow, becoming a deputy-head in Glasgow and secretary of his Constituency Labour Party before he entered Parliament. Whilst a teacher he completed a part-time course over three years at the University of Strathclyde for an MBA. In 1994, he became a visiting professor at Strathclyde University Business School, and now is a member of the Strategic Advisory Board at the University of Glasgow Business School. He is a member of the GMB Union.

== Political career ==
He was first elected for the Dumbarton constituency, Scotland, at the 1987 general election, after the previous MP, Ian Campbell retired. His original majority was a little over 2,000. Dumbarton constituency was replaced with the new West Dunbartonshire constituency for the 2005 general election, which McFall won with a majority over 12,500.

In 1995 he introduced a private member's bill, the Wild Mammals (Protection) Bill which, although unsuccessful, informed the Hunting Act 2004 outlawing the hunting of mammals by dogs in England and Wales.

He was a whip and junior minister (for Education, Training and Employment, Health and Community Relations, then in 1999 for Economy and Education) at the Northern Ireland Office from 1998 to 1999.

In 2001 he was appointed Chair of the Treasury Select Committee, and reappointed for a second term in this position in 2005. The committee conducted inquiries into the banking crisis, producing evidence of the bonus culture, the lack of banking qualifications among many top bankers and poor oversight of the industry by the Financial Services Authority.

On 29 January 2010, McFall announced his intention to stand down as an MP at the 2010 general election.

=== House of Lords ===
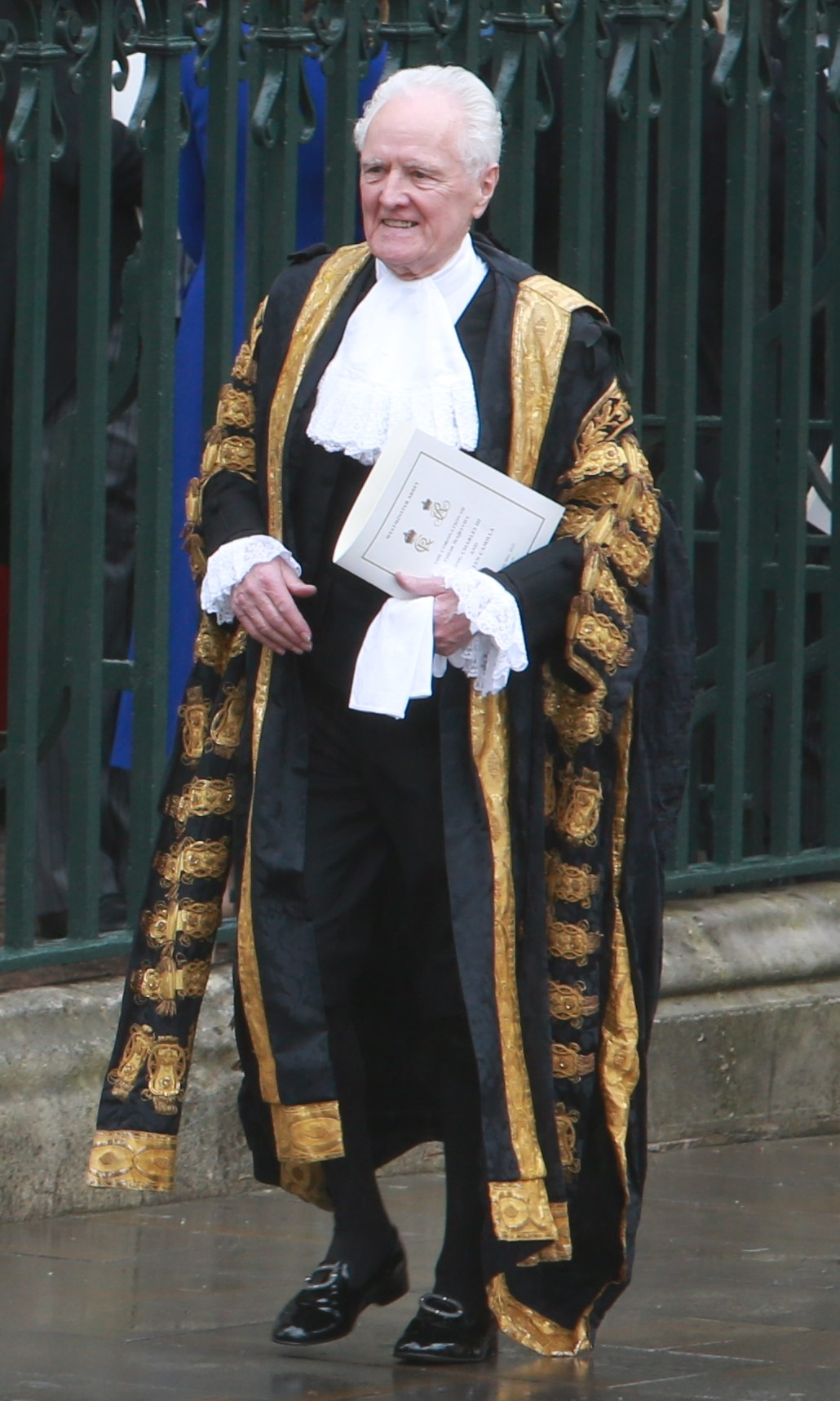
McFall enrobed at the Coronation of King Charles III in 2023

On 17 June 2010, he was created a life peer as Baron McFall of Alcluith, of Dumbarton in Dunbartonshire, and was introduced in the House of Lords on 6 July 2010.

He was the Vice-Chair of the All-Party Parliamentary Group on Overseas Development (Apgood).

In July 2016, he was appointed as Chairman of Committees of the House of Lords with effect from 1 September 2016. He was known as Senior Deputy Speaker while holding the office.

In the 2021 Lord Speaker election, McFall was elected as Lord Speaker, succeeding Lord Fowler.

In 2023 he suggested the House of Lords needs more independent, expert peers. Lord McFall stated he was making no direct criticism of recent peerage choices, but the upper house was in danger of becoming "out of sync" with its balance of legislators. McFall planned to meet Rishi Sunak to lift a cap limiting the number of new, non-party expert peers that can be created by the House of Lords Appointments Commission, currently set at a maximum of two a year.

In October 2025, he resigned as Lord Speaker with effect from 2 February 2026.

== Other activities ==
Since 2023, he routinely hosts the House of Lords themed podcast Lord Speaker's Corner, which features him discussing peership and other political topics with fellow Lords in Parliament.

== Personal life ==
McFall's family lived in Bellsmyre, Dumbarton, where he met and married Joan Ward. They have three sons and a daughter.

== Publications ==
- Workplace Retirement Income Commission, Building a Strong, Stable and Transparent Pension System: Final Report (August 2011)

== See also ==
- 2008 United Kingdom bank rescue package

Parliament of the United Kingdom
Preceded by Ian Campbell	Member of Parliament for Dumbarton; 1987–2005	Constituency abolished
New constituency	Member of Parliament for West Dunbartonshire; 2005–2010	Succeeded by Gemma Doyle
Preceded by The Lord Laming as Chairman of Committees	Senior Deputy Speaker of the House of Lords; 2016–2021	Succeeded by The Lord Gardiner of Kimble
Preceded by The Lord Fowler	Lord Speaker; 2021–2026	Succeeded by The Lord Forsyth of Drumlean
Order of precedence in England and Wales
Preceded by The Lord Sassoon	Gentlemen as a Baron of the United Kingdom	Succeeded by The Lord Wolfson of Aspley Guise
