= Stirling Art School =

Art school in Stirling, Scotland

- Type: Art school
- Established: 1857
- Location: Stirling, Scotland

Stirling Art School was an independent art college in Stirling, Scotland, providing tertiary education in art and design.

== History ==
It was founded in 1857. It was connected to the Science and Art Department of South Kensington in London from 1858.

Although art was taught at the art school, and the students even awarded medals at the school, the inspectors then sent off their students work to be graded in London:

The examination is conducted by an inspector, who brings his own copies and examples, to be drawn in his presence in a given time. These embrace freehand, geometry, perspective, mechanical, model, and memory drawing. There are two grades of proficiency. The second grade is higher than the first, and of a more difficult nature. Those who pass in the first cannot be again examined in the same grade, but must try the higher exercise. The exercises are collected and sent to London, where they are examined, and their merit determined. From this decision there is no appeal.

The chairman of the school was Robert Anderson, the Provost of Stirling; the Treasurer was Daniel Ferguson; the Secretary was John Kemp; and the Art Master was Leonard Baker.

== Teaching ==
A lot of the teaching at the school was done by Leonard Baker. He was London-born and attended the School of Design at Somerset House. He was a pupil of Alfred Stevens.

From The Stirling Sentinel portrait gallery:

In 1858 (15th March), the Stirling School of Art was connected with the Science and Art Department of South Kensington, and an Art Committee was appointed by the Town Council, with Mr. Baker as Secretary. The work done by Mr. Baker in this connection has been of the greatest value to many students, and it is owing to his labours that the Stirling Art School has gained a high reputation.

His son, a Mr. E. Baker, took over when his father retired.

== Closure ==
Records of the school start to dry up in the early 1900s. It is assumed that the school did not survive the First World War.

The local Stirling newspaper The Stirling Observer, although admitting the excellence of the school, was calling for it to be made into a technical college from 1885:

The Stirling Art School is a highly useful institution, and I could name several persons, male and female, who have benefited by the instruction they received there. I am glad to hear the new session has begun with prospects of even greater success than before. In the course of a few years means will be available to put the school on a more satisfactory footing as regards accommodation and appliances, and an efficient Technical School will doubtless be one of the results of the reorganisation of our local endowments.

== Notable alumni ==
- John Taylor, politician
- Catherine Monteath, painter
