= Central Dunbartonshire =

UK Parliament constituency (1974–1983)

- Former county constituency for the House of Commons
- Subdivisions of Scotland: Dunbartonshire

1974–1983
- Seats: One
- Created from: East Dunbartonshire; West Dunbartonshire
- Replaced by: Clydebank & Milngavie, Monklands West and Dumbarton

Central Dunbartonshire was a county constituency of the House of Commons of the Parliament of the United Kingdom (Westminster) from 1974 to 1983. It elected one Member of Parliament (MP) by the first past the post system of election.

== Boundaries ==
The constituency was created as a result of the Second Periodical Review of the Boundary Commission, and first used in the February 1974 general election.

The review took account of population growth in the county of Dunbarton, caused by overspill from the city of Glasgow into the new town of Cumbernauld and elsewhere, and Central Dunbartonshire was defined as one of three constituencies to replace the two constituencies of East Dunbartonshire and West Dunbartonshire. The other two constituencies took forward the names of the earlier constituencies.

Central Dunbartonshire consisted mainly of the burgh of Clydebank, but it also included the burgh of Milngavie and the Old Kilpatrick district of the county.

The same boundaries were used also for the general elections of October 1974 and 1979.

The constituency was represented by Hugh McCartney, who had previously been MP for East Dunbartonshire, throughout its relatively short existence. Its main claim to fame is that it was the scene of Jimmy Reid's candidature in 1974, when he gained the best vote by a Communist candidate for some time.

In 1975, under the Local Government (Scotland) Act 1973, Scottish counties were abolished in favour of regions and districts and islands council areas, and the county of Dunbarton was divided between several districts of the new region of Strathclyde. The Third Periodical Review took account of new local government boundaries, and the results were implemented for the 1983 general election.

== Members of Parliament ==
Election	Member	Party
Feb 1974	Hugh McCartney	Labour
1983	constituency abolished	

== Elections ==
=== Elections in the 1970s ===
General election 1979: Central Dunbartonshire
Party	Candidate	Votes	%	±%
Labour	Hugh McCartney	20,515	51.9	+11.7
Conservative	Nicholas Soames	8,512	21.5	+4.3
SNP	W. Lindsay	6,055	15.3	−13.8
Liberal	L. McCreadie	3,099	7.8	+3.0
Communist	D. McCafferty	1,017	2.6	−6.1
Christian Democrat	R. Darroch	312	0.8	New
Majority		12,003	30.4	+19.7
Turnout		39,510	80.0	+0.2
Labour hold		Swing		

General election October 1974: Central Dunbartonshire
Party	Candidate	Votes	%	±%
Labour	Hugh McCartney	15,837	40.2	−0.2
SNP	Cameron Aitken	11,452	29.1	+14.6
Conservative	Michael Hirst	6,792	17.2	−6.8
Communist	Jimmy Reid	3,417	8.7	−5.9
Liberal	J. E. Cameron	1,895	4.8	−1.6
Majority		4,385	11.1	−5.3
Turnout		39,393	79.8	−3.2
Labour hold		Swing		

General election February 1974: Central Dunbartonshire
Party	Candidate	Votes	%	±%
Labour	Hugh McCartney	16,439	40.4	
Conservative	Michael Hirst	9,775	24.0	
Communist	Jimmy Reid	5,928	14.6	
SNP	Andrew Welsh	5,906	14.5	
Liberal	Thomas Colin Harvey	2,583	6.4	
Workers Revolutionary	S. Hammond	52	0.1	
Majority		6,664	16.4	
Turnout		40,683	83.0	
Labour win (new seat)				
