= Clydebank and Milngavie =

Clydebank and Milngavie may refer to:

- Clydebank and Milngavie (UK Parliament constituency)
- Clydebank and Milngavie (Scottish Parliament constituency)
