= Tony Worthington =

British politician (1941–2026)

Member of Parliament for Clydebank and Milngavie
- In office 11 June 1987 – 11 April 2005
- Preceded by: Hugh McCartney
- Succeeded by: Constituency Abolished

Parliamentary Under-Secretary for Northern Ireland
- In office 6 May 1997 – 28 July 1998
- Appointed by: Tony Blair
- Preceded by: Malcolm Moss
- Succeeded by: George Howarth

Personal details
- Born: William Anthony Worthington; 11 October 1941 Hatfield, Hertfordshire, England
- Died: 20 April 2026 (aged 84)
- Party: Labour
- Spouse: Angela Oliver
- Children: 1 son, 1 daughter
- Education: London School of Economics (BSc); University of Glasgow (MEd); University of York (PGCE); Durham University (PGCE)
- Profession: FE college lecturer

William Anthony Worthington (11 October 1941 – 20 April 2026) was a British Labour Party politician who was a Member of Parliament for the constituency of Clydebank and Milngavie from 1987 to 2005.

== Early life and education ==
Worthington was brought up in Lincoln, attending the City School (a boys' grammar school) on Monks Road in Lincoln. He gained a BA in Sociology and Social Policy from the London School of Economics and a MEd from the University of Glasgow. From the University of York, he gained a PGCE, and then an Advanced PGCE from Durham University.

From 1962 to 1966 he was a lecturer in Social Policy and Sociology at HM Borstal, Dover, then at Monkwearmouth College of Further Education (merged with Wearside College in 1996 to form the City of Sunderland College) from 1967 to 1971, then from 1971 to 1987 at Jordanhill College of Further Education in Glasgow. He was a councillor on Strathclyde Regional Council from 1974 to 1987.

== Parliamentary career ==
In 1979, he tried to win the Labour nomination for the Strathclyde West seat in the European Parliament, but he came third at the selection meeting, behind Valerie Friel and John Carty.

Worthington was Labour Party Member of Parliament (MP) for Clydebank and Milngavie from 1987 until his retirement from Parliament in 2005.

In opposition in the mid-1990s Worthington was part Labour's shadow Northern Ireland ministerial team under Mo Mowlam, as then shadow Secretary of State for Northern Ireland.

Following the election of the New Labour government under Tony Blair, on 6 May 1997 Worthington was appointed as a deputy to Mowlam at the Northern Ireland Office when she became Secretary of State for Northern Ireland. He served as Parliamentary Under-Secretary for Northern Ireland, taking part in supporting Mowlam in the key negotiations which led up to the Good Friday Agreement, a role he served in until 28 July 1998 when he was sacked as part of the first major ministerial reshuffle of the Blair government.

He was noted for his work in relation to asbestosis.

In 2003, he voted against the Iraq War.

Worthington was not replaced as the MP for Clydebank and Milngavie because constituency boundaries in Scotland were redrawn before the 2005 election. This was to bring the number of MPs per head of population in line with the ratio in England (Scotland had previously been over-represented).

He was awarded an honorary DSc by the University of Greenwich in July 2009.

== Personal life and death ==
Worthington married Angela May Oliver in 1966, and had a son (Robert) and a daughter (Jennifer). He had at least three grandchildren.

In later life he developed prostate cancer and vascular dementia. He died on 20 April 2026, at the age of 84.

Parliament of the United Kingdom
| Preceded by Hugh McCartney | Member of Parliament for Clydebank and Milngavie; 1987–2005 | Constituency abolished |
