= Dumbarton Burghs =

Parliamentary constituency in the United Kingdom, 1918–1950

- Former district of burghs constituency for the House of Commons
- Subdivision: Dunbartonshire
- Major settlements: Dumbarton and Clydebank

1918–1950
- Seats: One
- Created from: Kilmarnock Burghs; Dunbartonshire
- Replaced by: Dunbartonshire East; Dunbartonshire West

Dumbarton Burghs was a district of burghs constituency of the House of Commons of the Parliament of the United Kingdom from 1918 to 1950.

== Boundaries ==
It consisted of the burghs of Dumbarton and Clydebank in Dunbartonshire. The rest of the county formed the rural (or county) constituency of Dunbartonshire.

== History ==
Before the creation of the Dumbarton Burghs constituency, the burgh of Dumbarton had formed as part of the constituency of Kilmarnock Burghs, and Clydebank had been within the Dunbartonshire county constituency. When Dumbarton Burghs was abolished, the whole county of Dunbartonshire was re-organised into two new county constituencies, Dunbartonshire East and Dunbartonshire West.

For almost all of its history, Dumbarton Burghs was represented by David Kirkwood of the Labour Party, an important Red Clydesider. The only exception was 1918 to 1922, when it was represented by John Taylor, a supporter of David Lloyd George's coalition government.

== Members of Parliament ==
| Election | Member | Party |
|---|---|---|
| 1918 | John Taylor | Coalition Liberal |
| Jan 1922 | John Taylor | National Liberal |
| Nov 1922 | David Kirkwood, later Baron Kirkwood | Labour |
| 1950 | constituency abolished | |

== Election results ==
=== Elections in the 1910s ===
General election 1918: Dumbarton Burghs
| Party | Candidate | Votes | % |
|---|---|---|---|
| National Democratic (National Liberal) | John Taylor | 11,734 | 52.62 |
| Labour | David Kirkwood | 10,566 | 47.38 |
| Majority | | 1,168 | 5.24 |
| Turnout | | 22,300 | 70.40 |
| Registered electors | | 31,678 | |
| National Liberal win (new seat) | | | |
C indicates candidate endorsed by the coalition government.

=== Elections in the 1920s ===
General election 1922: Dumbarton Burghs
| Party | Candidate | Votes | % | ±% |
|---|---|---|---|---|
| Labour | David Kirkwood | 16,397 | 64.29 | +16.91 |
| National Liberal | John Taylor | 9,107 | 35.71 | −16.91 |
| Majority | | 7,290 | 28.58 | N/A |
| Turnout | | 25,504 | 76.22 | +5.82 |
| Registered electors | | 33,463 | | |
| Labour gain from Liberal | | Swing | +16.91 | |

General election 1923: Dumbarton Burghs
| Party | Candidate | Votes | % | ±% |
|---|---|---|---|---|
| Labour | David Kirkwood | 13,472 | 61.26 | −3.03 |
| Unionist | Walter Black Munro | 8,520 | 38.74 | New |
| Majority | | 4,952 | 22.52 | −6.06 |
| Turnout | | 21,992 | 67.98 | −8.24 |
| Registered electors | | 32,349 | | |
| Labour hold | | Swing | −3.03 | |

General election 1924: Dumbarton Burghs
| Party | Candidate | Votes | % | ±% |
|---|---|---|---|---|
| Labour | David Kirkwood | 14,562 | 59.22 | −2.04 |
| Unionist | Walter Black Munro | 10,027 | 40.78 | +2.04 |
| Majority | | 4,535 | 18.44 | −4.08 |
| Turnout | | 24,589 | 76.14 | +8.16 |
| Registered electors | | 32,293 | | |
| Labour hold | | Swing | −2.04 | |

General election 1929: Dumbarton Burghs
| Party | Candidate | Votes | % | ±% |
|---|---|---|---|---|
| Labour | David Kirkwood | 19,193 | 63.10 | +3.88 |
| Unionist | Charles Milne | 11,225 | 36.90 | −3.88 |
| Majority | | 7,968 | 26.20 | +7.76 |
| Turnout | | 30,418 | 77.06 | +0.92 |
| Registered electors | | 39,474 | | |
| Labour hold | | Swing | +3.88 | |

=== Elections in the 1930s ===
General election 1931: Dumbarton Burghs
| Party | Candidate | Votes | % | ±% |
|---|---|---|---|---|
| Independent Labour | David Kirkwood | 16,335 | 51.57 | −11.53 |
| Unionist | MJ McCracken | 15,338 | 48.43 | +11.53 |
| Majority | | 997 | 3.14 | N/A |
| Turnout | | 31,673 | 80.69 | +3.63 |
| Registered electors | | 39,253 | | |
| Independent Labour gain from Labour | | Swing | −11.53 | |

General election 1935: Dumbarton Burghs
| Party | Candidate | Votes | % | ±% |
|---|---|---|---|---|
| Labour | David Kirkwood | 20,409 | 65.17 | +13.60 |
| Unionist | MJ McCracken | 10,909 | 34.83 | −13.60 |
| Majority | | 9,500 | 30.34 | N/A |
| Turnout | | 31,318 | 78.80 | −1.89 |
| Registered electors | | 39,744 | | |
| Labour gain from Independent Labour | | Swing | +13.60 | |

=== Elections in the 1940s ===
General election 1945: Dumbarton Burghs
| Party | Candidate | Votes | % | ±% |
|---|---|---|---|---|
| Labour | David Kirkwood | 16,262 | 65.21 | +0.04 |
| Unionist | John Richardson | 8,676 | 34.79 | −0.04 |
| Majority | | 7,586 | 30.42 | +0.08 |
| Turnout | | 24,938 | 73.20 | −5.60 |
| Registered electors | | 34,067 | | |
| Labour hold | | Swing | +0.04 | |

== See also ==
- Former United Kingdom Parliament constituencies
