= Martin Docherty-Hughes =

Scottish SNP politician (born 1971)

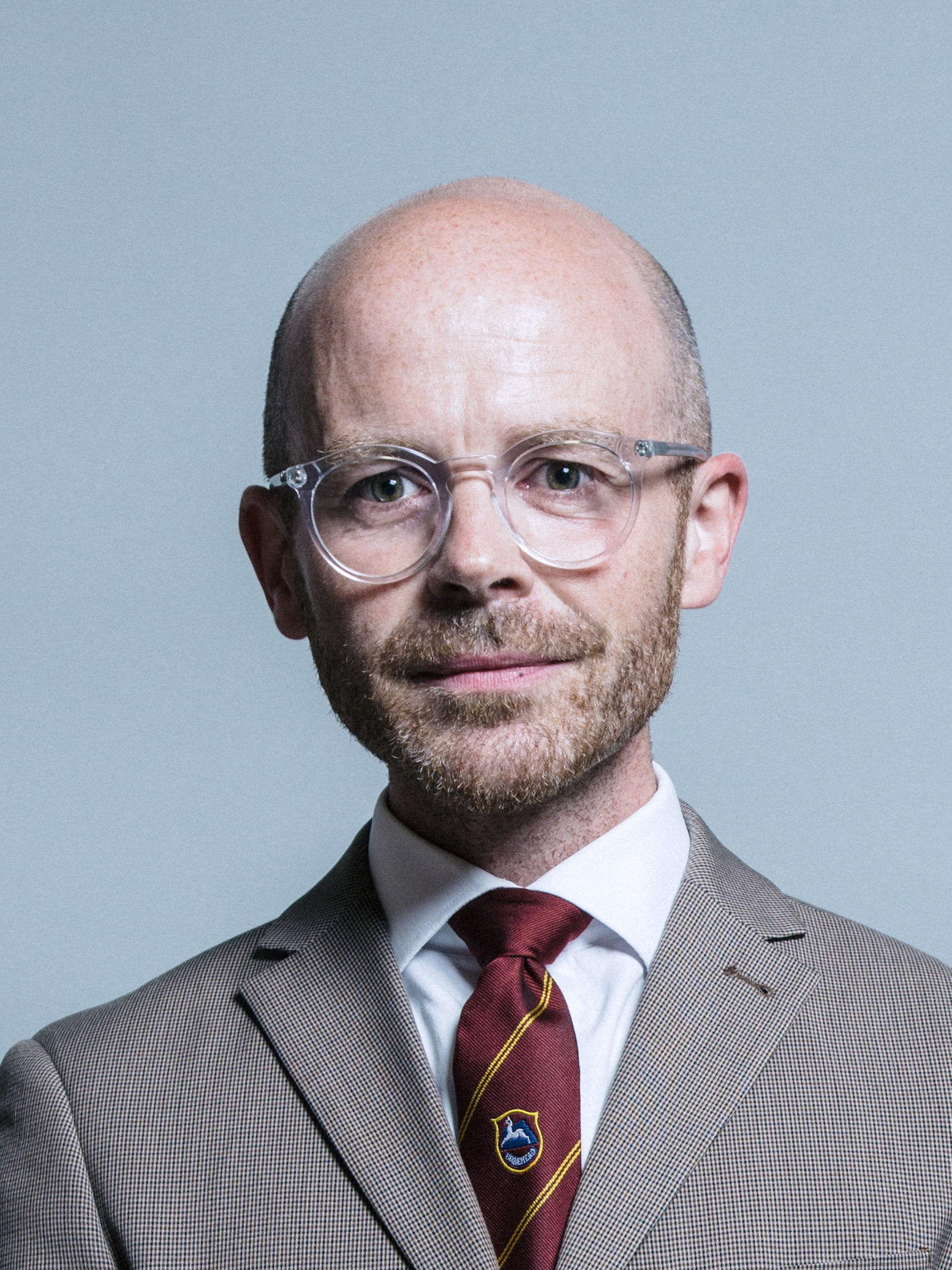
- Official portrait, 2017

SNP Defence Spokesperson in the House of Commons
- In office 4 September 2023 – 5 July 2024
- Leader: Stephen Flynn
- Preceded by: Dave Doogan
- Succeeded by: Position Abolished

Chief Whip of the Scottish National Party in the House of Commons
- In office 7 December 2022 – 17 January 2023
- Leader: Stephen Flynn
- Preceded by: Owen Thompson
- Succeeded by: Brendan O'Hara

Member of Parliament for West Dunbartonshire
- In office 7 May 2015 – 30 May 2024
- Preceded by: Gemma Doyle
- Succeeded by: Douglas McAllister

Personal details
- Born: Martin John Docherty; 21 January 1971 (age 55) Clydebank, Scotland
- Party: Scottish National Party
- Education: Glasgow Metropolitan College; University of Essex; Glasgow School of Art
- Website: martindocherty.scot

Martin John Docherty-Hughes (born 21 January 1971) is a Scottish National Party politician. He was previously the Member of Parliament (MP) for West Dunbartonshire from 2015 until his defeat in 2024. He has also served as SNP Defence Spokesperson from 2023 to 2024.

== Early life and education ==
Docherty-Hughes was raised by his parents in Clydebank, and began working from the age of 16. He studied at the Glasgow College of Food Technology, now City of Glasgow College, graduating with an HND in Business Administration in 1997. He subsequently obtained a degree in Politics from the University of Essex and attended the Glasgow School of Art for his master's degree. On finishing his studies Martin returned to Clydebank and worked for a decade for the West Dunbartonshire Community and Volunteering Services (WDCVS).

== Political career ==
He joined the Scottish National Party in 1991, and was elected the following year as Scotland's youngest councillor to the-then Clydebank District Council in May 1992, at the age of 21, until 31 March 1996. He was elected to the third seat of the Anderston/City ward of the Glasgow City Council on 3 May 2012 polling 1,057 votes and 19.9% and exceeding the quota on the second count, becoming a Bailie until 14 May 2015.

In February 2015, he was selected as the SNP candidate for the West Dunbartonshire constituency in the 2015 UK general election. He defeated incumbent Gemma Doyle, winning 30,198 votes and 59% of the vote. As a consequence of his election to Parliament, he stepped down from his position on Glasgow City Council.

He changed his name from Docherty to Docherty-Hughes after marrying his husband John Hughes in January 2016.

The descendant of a woman from Ballinglen, County Mayo and a man from Stralongford in County Donegal, he is also a relative of Ian McGarvey and has many relatives scattered around Philadelphia and New York.

He was appointed as Chief Whip following the 2022 SNP Westminster Group Leadership contest by new leader, Stephen Flynn.

Docherty-Hughes was unseated at the 2024 general election, losing his seat to Douglas McAllister of Scottish Labour.

== Post-parliamentary career ==
Following his defeat at the 2024 UK General Election, Doucherty-Hughes has worked as a freelance public affairs consultant. He has also joined Scottish Media Training (SMT) to advise witnesses facing parliamentary committees.

Parliament of the United Kingdom
Preceded by Gemma Doyle	Member of Parliament for West Dunbartonshire; 2015–2024	Succeeded by Douglas McAllister
