= Ian Campbell (Scottish politician) =

Scottish politician (1926–2007)

Member of Parliament for Dumbarton West Dunbartonshire (1983–1987)
- In office 18 June 1970 – 18 May 1987
- Preceded by: Tom Steele
- Succeeded by: John McFall

Personal details
- Born: 26 April 1926 Dumbarton, West Dunbartonshire, Scotland
- Died: 9 September 2007 (aged 81) Dumbarton, West Dunbartonshire, Scotland
- Party: Labour

Ian Campbell (26 April 1926 – 9 September 2007) was a Scottish politician who served as a backbench Labour Member of Parliament (MP) of the United Kingdom from 1970 to 1987.

== Early life ==
Campbell was born in Dumbarton, the second of the four children of William Campbell and his wife Helen (née Crockett). He was educated at Knoxland Primary School and Dumbarton Academy, and studied electrical engineering at the Royal College of Science and Technology in Glasgow (now Strathclyde University). After National Service in Germany with the Royal Engineers, he became a chartered engineer, and worked for the South of Scotland Electricity Board from 1948 to 1965. He married Mary Millar in 1950; they had two sons and three daughters.

== Political career ==
Campbell joined the Labour Party in 1953. He was elected to Dumbarton Burgh Council in 1958 and was first elected as Provost of Dumbarton in 1962. In 1968, was re-elected unopposed for an almost unprecedented third term. The Labour administration in Dumbarton during these years embarked on a significant programme of slum clearance, house building, and town centre redevelopment. The closure of the Denny Shipyard in 1963 was the most significant sign of a shift from heavy industry as the major source of employment in the town requiring a major investment of effort from the council and its leadership in economic development.

When Tom Steele, the Labour MP for Dunbartonshire West, indicated that he would stand down at the 1970 general election, Campbell was selected by the Constituency Labour Party as their candidate. He was duly elected, serving as MP for Dunbartonshire West until 1983 and then for the successor seat, Dumbarton, until 1987.

He won at five general elections, although his seat was not always particularly safe, particularly in the two general elections of 1974: his majority was reduced to just over 1,800 votes by the Scottish National Party at the October 1974 general election. As a Member of Parliament, his focus was firmly on the interests of his constituency and constituents. Throughout his time in parliament, he took a keen interest in the Scotch whisky industry, which was the key employer in the constituency. The nuclear base at Faslane was also in his constituency, and his constituents were also affected by the decline of the shipbuilding industry on the Lower Clyde. Although a backbencher for all of his time in the Commons, he was Parliamentary Private Secretary to the Secretary of State for Scotland, Bruce Millan, from 1976 until 1979, during the period when the Labour government was proposing to implement Scottish devolution. He also served for many years as a member of the Chairman's panel, and eventually as the regular Chairman of the Scottish Grand Committee. He was involved in the campaign against abortion, co-sponsoring an ultimately unsuccessful private member's bill introduced by his friend and colleague, James White, MP for Glasgow Pollok, to tighten the requirements of the Abortion Act 1967. Campbell acted as an informal whip in the committees considering various bills aimed at tightening the law in this area. Early in the 1979 parliament, he successfully piloted a private member's bill through the House of Commons to enable Scottish local authorities to offer concessionary transport to people with mental disabilities.

In the run-up to the 1983 general election, he narrowly won a re-selection battle within his own Constituency Labour Party, against a challenge from a Leo Crawley, later a left-wing councillor in the constituency. In that election he was re-elected for the new Dumbarton constituency, which was practically the same as his old constituency, the only change was the addition of the villages of Bowling, and Milton. He retired at the 1987 general election and was replaced by John McFall.

== Later life ==
After he retired from Parliament, Campbell he was active as an elder at Riverside Church in Dumbarton. He was also a member of the Dumbarton District Enterprise Trust, a member of the Strathclyde Local Valuation Panel, and a magistrate.

He was diagnosed with prostate cancer in 2007, and died in Dumbarton. He was survived by his wife, five children and thirteen grand children.

Parliament of the United Kingdom
Preceded by Tom Steele	Member of Parliament for Dunbartonshire West; 1970–1983	Constituency abolished
New constituency	Member of Parliament for Dumbarton; 1983–1987	Succeeded by John McFall
