= Gemma Doyle (politician) =

British politician

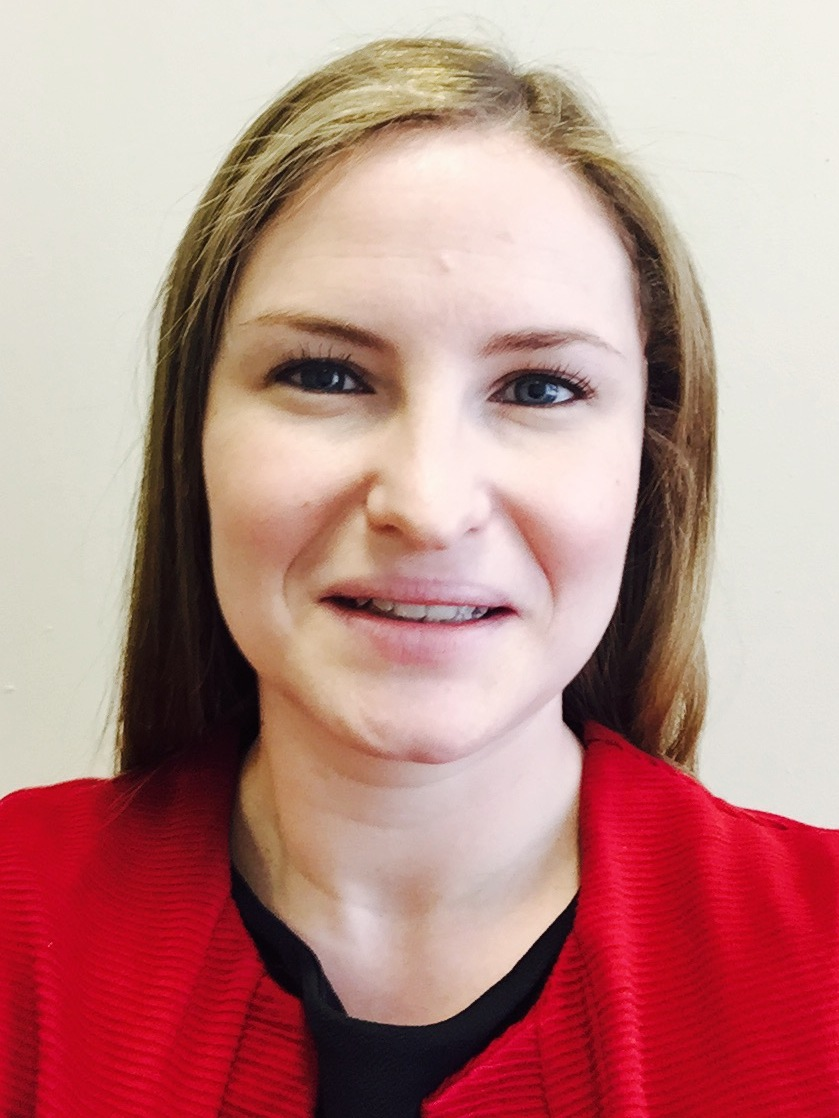
- Doyle in 2015

Member of Parliament for West Dunbartonshire
- In office 6 May 2010 – 30 March 2015
- Preceded by: John McFall
- Succeeded by: Martin Docherty
Shadow portfolios
2010–2015	Shadow Minister for Defence Personnel, Welfare and Veterans

Personal details
- Born: 13 April 1981 (age 45) Alexandria, West Dunbartonshire, Scotland
- Party: Labour Co-op
- Education: University of Glasgow (MA)

Gemma Doyle (born 13 April 1981) is a British former politician who served as Member of Parliament (MP) for West Dunbartonshire from 2010 to 2015. A member of the Labour and Co-operative parties, she has worked in public affairs since her departure from Parliament.

== Early life ==
Gemma Doyle was born on 13 April 1981 in Alexandria, West Dunbartonshire. She received a Master of Arts (MA) in European Civilisation from the University of Glasgow.

== Political and later career ==
Doyle was a researcher for Cathie Craigie, then a Member of Scottish Parliament, and later worked as a Labour Party officer. She has also worked for Holyrood Communications, a political communications company, and the Institution of Civil Engineers.

Following her departure from Parliament, she relocated to London and became director of a public affairs firm. Doyle has served as a member of the London Labour board and chair of Bermondsey and Old Southwark Labour. She is a trustee of the Foreign Policy Centre.

=== Parliamentary career ===
At the 2004 European Parliament election, she contested the Scotland constituency as a Labour candidate.

Doyle was elected as Member of Parliament for West Dunbartonshire at the 2010 general election. She served on the Energy and Climate Change Committee and the Administration Committee from July to November 2010.

Following Ed Miliband's election as Labour Leader, Doyle was appointed Shadow Defence Personnel, Welfare and Veterans Minister in October 2010. During her tenure on the opposition front bench, she was a member of the committee scrutinising the Armed Forces Act 2011.

Doyle was defeated by the Scottish National Party's Martin Docherty at the 2015 general election.

== Personal life ==
Doyle was previously married to Gregor Poynton, an MP since 2024, and former political strategist and Scottish Labour campaigner.

Parliament of the United Kingdom
Preceded by John McFall	Member of Parliament for West Dunbartonshire; 2010–2015	Succeeded by Martin Docherty
Political offices
Preceded by Bob Ainsworth	Shadow Minister for Defence Personnel, Welfare and Veterans; 2010–2015	Succeeded by Rachael Maskell (as Shadow Minister for Armed Forces Personnel and Veterans)
