= Hugh McCartney =

Scottish politician

Hugh McCartney (3 January 1920 – 28 February 2006) was a Scottish Labour Party politician.

== Early life ==
Born in Glasgow, the son of a tram driver, McCartney studied at John Street Senior Secondary School in the Bridgeton area of the city, and at the Royal Technical College (later the University of Strathclyde) in the city centre. He joined the Independent Labour Party's Guild of Youth at the age of 14 and began a textile apprenticeship. He joined the Labour Party at 16. During the Second World War he entered engineering at Rolls-Royce in Coventry and for the Royal Air Force, becoming active as a trade unionist.

== Political career ==
McCartney became a councillor on Kirkintilloch town council in 1955, and in 1965 a Dunbartonshire county councillor, serving on both bodies until 1970. That year he was elected to Parliament for the Clydeside seat of Dunbartonshire East, defeating Communist shipbuilders' trade union leader Jimmy Reid. McCartney too became active in supporting the Clydeside shipbuilding industry.

From 1974, McCartney represented Dunbartonshire Central, then Clydebank and Milngavie from 1983 after further boundary changes. A low-profile Member of Parliament, he was a Scottish whip and active in the TGWU and Scottish groups of Labour MPs. He retired from Parliament in 1987.

== Personal life ==
McCartney was married to fellow trade unionist Margaret, with whom he had two daughters, Irene and Margaret, and one son, Ian McCartney. Ian also had a career in politics, and his roles included Minister of State for Trade, Chairman of the Labour Party and Member of Parliament for Makerfield between 1987 and 2010.

Parliament of the United Kingdom
Preceded by Cyril Bence	Member of Parliament for East Dunbartonshire; 1970 – February 1974	Succeeded by Barry Henderson
New constituency	Member of Parliament for Central Dunbartonshire; February 1974 – 1983	Constituency abolished
New constituency	Member of Parliament for Clydebank and Milngavie; 1983 – 1987	Succeeded by Tony Worthington
