= West Dunbartonshire (constituency) =

UK Parliament constituency (1950–1983, 2005 onwards)

Coordinates: 55.966°N 4.506°W

- County constituency for the House of Commons
- Boundary of West Dunbartonshire in Scotland
- Subdivision: Glasgow; West Dunbartonshire
- Electorate: 70,286 (March 2020)
- Major settlements: Alexandria, Balloch, Clydebank, Dalmuir, Drumry, Dumbarton

Current constituency
- Created: 2005
- Member of Parliament: Douglas McAllister (Labour)
- Seats: One
- Created from: Dumbarton; Clydebank & Milngavie

1950–1983
- Seats: One
- Created from: Dunbartonshire; Dumbarton Burghs
- Replaced by: Dumbarton

West Dunbartonshire is a county constituency of the House of Commons of the Parliament of the United Kingdom. It elects one Member of Parliament (MP) by the first past the post system of election.

The current constituency was first used in the 2005 general election. There was also an earlier West Dunbartonshire constituency, from 1950 to 1983.

The current MP is Douglas McAllister of the Labour Party, who was elected at the 2024 United Kingdom general election.

== Boundaries ==
=== Historic ===
The historic constituency was created under the House of Commons (Redistribution of Seats) Act 1949 and first used in the 1950 general election.

As created in 1950, the constituency was one of two covering the county of Dunbarton. The other was East Dunbartonshire. The two new constituencies replaced the earlier constituencies of Dunbartonshire and Dumbarton Burghs.

West Dunbartonshire covered the Helensburgh, Old Kilpatrick, and Vale of Leven districts of the county and the burghs of Cove and Kilcreggan, Dumbarton and Helensburgh.

For the 1951 general election the constituency boundaries were adjusted to take account of a change to the boundaries of the Old Kilpatrick district.

The results of the First Periodical Review of the Boundary Commission were implemented for the 1955 general election, but there was no change to the boundaries of West Dunbartonshire, and the boundaries of 1951 and 1955 were used also in the general elections of 1959, 1964, 1966 and 1970.

The results of the Second Periodical Review were implemented for the February 1974 general election. The review took account of population growth in the county of Dunbarton, caused by overspill from the city of Glasgow into the new town of Cumbernauld and elsewhere, and West Dunbartonshire became one of three constituencies covering the county. The other two were East Dunbartonshire and Central Dunbartonshire. West Dunbartonshire now covered the Helensburgh and Vale of Leven districts and the burghs of Cove and Kilcreggan, Dumbarton and Helensburgh.

February 1974 boundaries were used also for the general elections of October 1974 and 1979.

In 1975, under the Local Government (Scotland) Act 1973, Scottish counties were abolished in favour of regions and districts and islands council areas, and the county of Dunbarton was divided between several districts of the new region of Strathclyde. The Third Periodical Review took account of new local government boundaries and the results were implemented for the 1983 general election.

=== Current ===
Map of boundaries from 2024

2005–2024: The existing constituency was created for the 2005 general election as a result of the Fifth Periodical Review of the Boundary Commission for Scotland. It covered and was entirely within the West Dunbartonshire council area. The area of the constituency was previously divided between the Dumbarton and Clydebank and Milngavie constituencies. It includes the population centres of Clydebank, Dumbarton and Alexandria.

2024–present: Under the 2023 review of Westminster constituencies which came into effect for the 2024 general election, the constituency was expanded slightly to the east to include a small part of the Glasgow City Council ward of Garscadden/Scotstounhill.

== Members of Parliament ==
Election	Member	Party
1950	Adam McKinlay	Labour
1950 by-election	Tom Steele	Labour
1970	Ian Campbell	Labour
1983	constituency abolished	
	constituency recreated	
2005	John McFall	Labour
2010	Gemma Doyle	Labour
2015	Martin Docherty-Hughes	SNP
2024	Douglas McAllister	Labour

== Election results ==
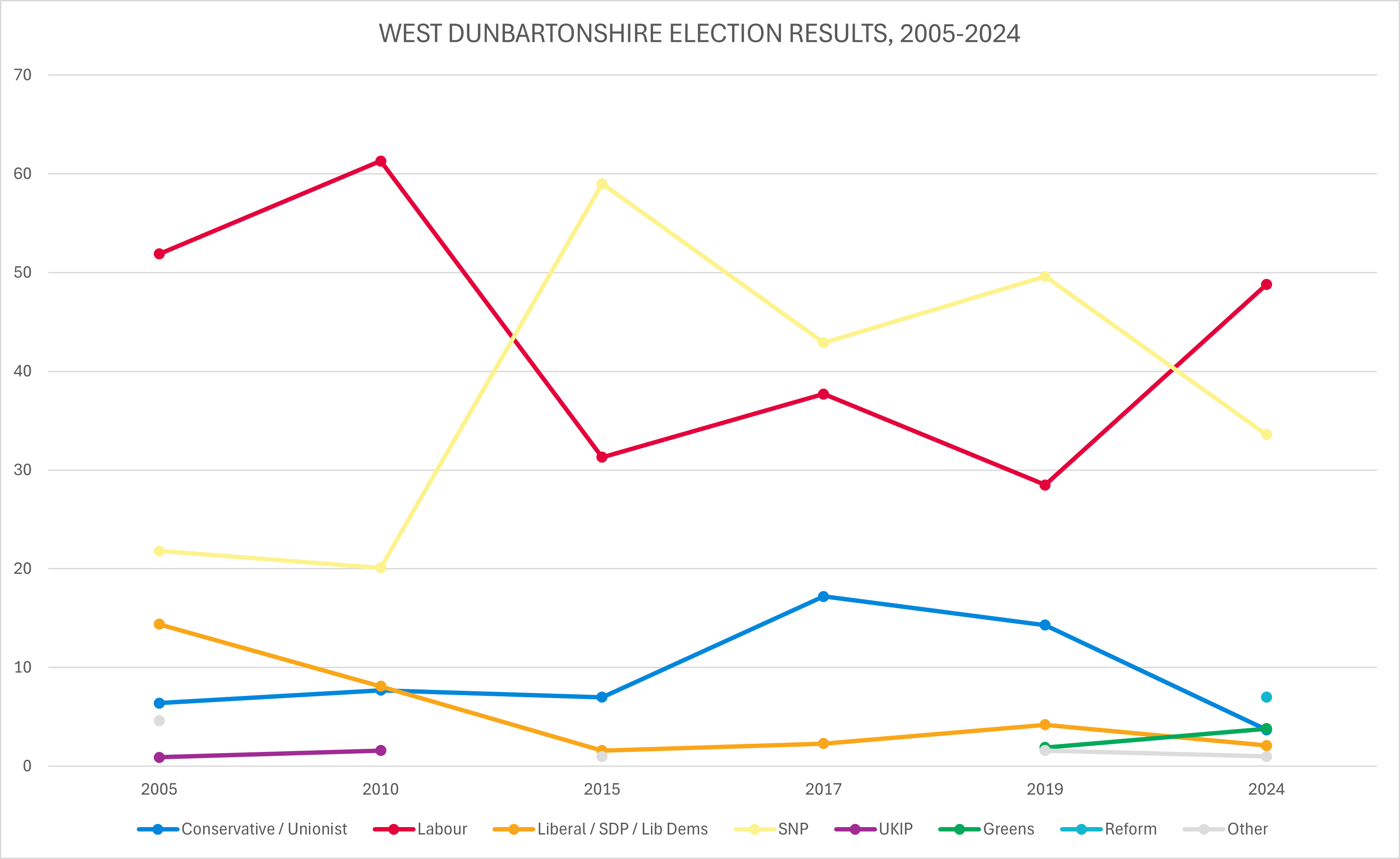
Election results 2005–2024

=== Elections in the 2020s ===
General election 2024: West Dunbartonshire
Party	Candidate	Votes	%	±%
Labour	Douglas McAllister	19,312	48.8	+20.2
SNP	Martin Docherty-Hughes	13,302	33.6	−16.1
Reform	David Smith	2,770	7.0	New
Green	Paula Baker	1,496	3.8	+1.9
Conservative	Maurice Corry	1,474	3.7	−10.5
Liberal Democrats	Paul Donald Kennedy	839	2.1	−2.1
Scottish Family	Andrew Muir	318	0.8	New
Sovereignty	Kelly Wilson	73	0.2	New
Majority		6,010	15.2	N/A
Turnout		39,584	57.3	−9.0
Registered electors		69,074		
Labour gain from SNP		Swing	+18.2	

=== Elections in the 2010s ===
2019 notional result (Note: Estimate of the 2019 general election result as if the revised boundaries recommended under the 2023 boundary review were in place)
Party	Vote	%
SNP	23,163	49.7
Labour	13,322	28.6
Conservative	6,606	14.2
Liberal Democrats	1,949	4.2
Scottish Greens	867	1.9
Independent	708	1.5
Majority	9,841	21.1
Turnout	46,615	66.3
Electorate	70,286	

General election 2019: West Dunbartonshire
Party	Candidate	Votes	%	±%
SNP	Martin Docherty-Hughes	22,396	49.6	+6.7
Labour	Jean Mitchell	12,843	28.5	−9.2
Conservative	Alix Mathieson	6,436	14.3	−2.9
Liberal Democrats	Jennifer Lang	1,890	4.2	+1.9
Green	Peter Connolly	867	1.9	New
Independent	Andrew Muir	708	1.6	New
Majority		9,553	21.1	+15.9
Turnout		45,140	68.0	+2.9
SNP hold		Swing	+8.0	

General election 2017: West Dunbartonshire
Party	Candidate	Votes	%	±%
SNP	Martin Docherty-Hughes	18,890	42.9	−16.1
Labour	Jean Mitchell	16,602	37.7	+6.4
Conservative	Penny Hutton	7,582	17.2	+10.2
Liberal Democrats	Rebecca Plenderleith	1,009	2.3	+0.7
Majority		2,288	5.2	−22.5
Turnout		44,083	65.1	−8.8
SNP hold		Swing	−11.3	

General election 2015: West Dunbartonshire
Party	Candidate	Votes	%	±%
SNP	Martin Docherty	30,198	59.0	+38.9
Labour Co-op	Gemma Doyle	16,027	31.3	−30.0
Conservative	Maurice Corry	3,597	7.0	−0.7
Liberal Democrats	Aileen Morton	816	1.6	−6.5
Independent	Claire Muir	503	1.0	New
Majority		14,171	27.7	N/A ^{1}
Turnout		51,141	73.9	+9.9
SNP gain from Labour Co-op		Swing	+34.5	

^{1} Change to majority not meaningful as seat changed hands.

General election 2010: West Dunbartonshire
Party	Candidate	Votes	%	±%
Labour Co-op	Gemma Doyle	25,905	61.3	+9.4
SNP	Graeme McCormick	8,497	20.1	−1.7
Liberal Democrats	Helen Watt	3,434	8.1	−6.3
Conservative	Martyn McIntyre	3,242	7.7	+1.3
UKIP	Mitch Sorbie	683	1.6	+0.9
Socialist Labour	Katharine McGavigan	505	1.2	New
Majority		17,408	41.2	+11.1
Turnout		42,266	64.0	+2.7
Labour Co-op hold		Swing	+5.5	

=== Elections in the 2000s ===
General election 2005: West Dunbartonshire
Party	Candidate	Votes	%	±%
Labour Co-op	John McFall	21,600	51.9	−11.6
SNP	Tom Chalmers	9,047	21.8	−2.2
Liberal Democrats	Niall Walker	5,999	14.4	+12.0
Conservative	Campbell Murdoch	2,679	6.4	+1.4
Scottish Socialist	Les Robertson	1,708	4.1	−0.9
UKIP	Bryan Maher	354	0.9	New
Christian Vote	Marlon Dawson	202	0.5	New
Majority		12,553	30.1	−9.4
Turnout		41,589	61.3	
Labour Co-op win (new seat)				

=== Elections in the 1970s ===
General election 1979: West Dunbartonshire
Party	Candidate	Votes	%	±%
Labour	Ian Campbell	21,166	48.42	+10.37
Conservative	J Cameron Munro	14,709	33.65	+10.48
SNP	Stan Stratton	7,835	17.92	−15.77
Majority		6,457	14.77	+10.31
Turnout		43,710	80.19	+1.92
Labour hold		Swing	−0.05	

General election October 1974: West Dunbartonshire
Party	Candidate	Votes	%	±%
Labour	Ian Campbell	15,511	38.15	−1.45
SNP	A. Murray	13,697	33.69	+6.63
Conservative	R.R. MacDonald	9,421	23.17	−10.07
Liberal	J.D. Murricane	2,029	4.99	New
Majority		1,814	4.46	−1.90
Turnout		40,640	78.27	−1.30
Labour hold		Swing	+4.04	

General election February 1974: West Dunbartonshire
Party	Candidate	Votes	%	±%
Labour	Ian Campbell	16,247	39.60	−11.30
Conservative	Moira Carse	13,638	33.24	−3.91
SNP	A Murray	11,144	27.16	+15.18
Majority		2,609	6.36	−7.41
Turnout		41,129	79.57	+1.64
Labour hold		Swing	−13.24	

General election 1970: West Dunbartonshire
Party	Candidate	Votes	%	±%
Labour	Ian Campbell	23,009	50.90	−1.36
Conservative	William Adams	16,783	37.13	+3.98
SNP	Robert O Campbell	5,414	11.98	−2.61
Majority		6,226	13.77	−5.34
Turnout		45,206	77.93	−4.02
Labour hold		Swing	+2.67	

=== Elections in the 1960s ===
General election 1966: West Dunbartonshire
Party	Candidate	Votes	%	±%
Labour	Thomas Steele	21,636	52.26	+1.51
Conservative	William Adams	13,724	33.15	−4.05
SNP	Robert O Campbell	6,042	14.59	+2.54
Majority		7,912	19.11	+5.56
Turnout		41,402	81.95	−0.11
Labour hold		Swing	+2.78	

General election 1964: West Dunbartonshire
Party	Candidate	Votes	%	±%
Labour	Thomas Steele	21,079	50.75	−1.79
Unionist	Patrick Tobias Telfer Smollett	15,448	37.20	−10.26
SNP	Alexander Gray	5,004	12.05	New
Majority		5,631	13.55	+8.47
Turnout		41,531	82.06	−1.61
Labour hold		Swing	−6.92	

=== Elections in the 1950s ===
General election 1959: West Dunbartonshire
Party	Candidate	Votes	%	±%
Labour	Tom Steele	22,105	52.54	+0.20
Unionist	Norman Macleod Glen	19,964	47.46	−0.20
Majority		2,141	5.08	+0.40
Turnout		42,069	83.67	−1.17
Labour hold		Swing	+0.20	

General election 1955: West Dunbartonshire
Party	Candidate	Votes	%	±%
Labour	Tom Steele	21,854	52.34	+1.06
Unionist	Molly Huggins	19,902	47.66	+2.27
Majority		1,952	4.68	−1.21
Turnout		41,756	84.84	−1.72
Labour hold		Swing	+0.61	

General election 1951: West Dunbartonshire
Party	Candidate	Votes	%	±%
Labour	Tom Steele	21,799	51.28	+0.92
Unionist	Patrick Fraser	19,292	45.39	−4.25
Liberal	Lawrence Lauderdale Maitland	1,415	3.33	New
Majority		2,507	5.89	+5.17
Turnout		42,504	86.56	+1.10
Labour hold		Swing	+2.08	

1950 Dunbartonshire West by-election
Party	Candidate	Votes	%	±%
Labour	Tom Steele	20,367	50.36	+1.07
Unionist	Robert Allan	20,074	49.64	+1.83
Majority		293	0.72	−0.76
Turnout		40,441		
Labour hold		Swing	+0.38	

General election 1950: West Dunbartonshire
Party	Candidate	Votes	%	±%
Labour	Adam McKinlay	20,398	49.29	
Unionist	Robert Allan	19,785	47.81	
Communist	Finlay Hart	1,198	2.90	
Majority		613	1.48	
Turnout		41,381	85.46	
Labour win (new seat)				
