= Michael Hirst (politician) =

Scottish politician, accountant, public relations consultant and company director

Sir Michael Hirst

Member of Parliament for Strathkelvin and Bearsden
- In office 9 June 1983 – 18 May 1987
- Preceded by: New constituency
- Succeeded by: Sam Galbraith

Chairman of the Scottish Conservatives
- In office 1993–1997
- Succeeded by: Raymond Robertson

Personal details
- Born: 2 January 1946 (age 80)
- Party: Conservatives
- Spouse: Naomi Ferguson (m. 1972)
- Children: 3

Sir Michael William Hirst (born 2 January 1946) is a former Scottish Conservative and Unionist Party politician, chartered accountant and public relations consultant, company director and past president of the International Diabetes Federation.

== Early life ==
Hirst studied at Glasgow Academy and the University of Glasgow. Before entering politics, Hirst had a career as a chartered accountant and partner in Peat Marwick, now KPMG.

== Political career ==
Hirst fought several elections before being successful. In February and October 1974 he stood at Central Dunbartonshire without success. At the 1979 general election he contested East Dunbartonshire but was again defeated.

He was elected Member of Parliament for Strathkelvin and Bearsden at the 1983 general election, but lost the seat to Labour's Sam Galbraith at the 1987 election.

He was PPS at the Department of Energy from 1985 to 1987. He attempted to retake Strathkelvin and Bearsden in 1992 election but was beaten again by Galbraith, the same year he was knighted. In 1997 he was forced to resign his position as Scottish Conservative Chairman and Westminster candidate for the seat of Eastwood, in the wake of revelations about his private life, as he had had several previous homosexual affairs with other, younger Scottish Tories.

== After Parliament ==
Hirst was subsequently the president of the Scottish Conservative and Unionist Association from 1989 to 1992 and chairman of the Scottish Conservative Party from 1993 to 1997, having been vice-chair 1987–1989.

He was knighted in 1992 for political and public service in 1992. He is chairman of the Scottish Division of ISKB, and a member of its council.

Hirst joined Pagoda Public Relations in 1998 and was appointed chairman in 2000. He attained his MCIPR in 2003. He is chairman of Millstream Associates Limited, Aberdeen. He was made a Doctor of Letters by Glasgow Caledonian University in 2004.

He was the first non-medical chairman of the board of trustees of Diabetes UK from 2001–2006 and was elected vice president of the International Diabetes Federation in 2006, serving in that position until he was elected president-elect in 2009. He took up office as president at the end of 2012, serving until December 2015.

== Personal life ==
He has two daughters and one son with his wife, Naomi Ferguson, whom he married in 1972. In his spare time he enjoys golf, hill walking, theatre and skiing. He is a member of the Carlton Club in London and the Western Club in Glasgow.

Parliament of the United Kingdom
New constituency	Member of Parliament for Strathkelvin and Bearsden; 1983 – 1987	Succeeded by Sam Galbraith
Preceded by ?	Chairman of the Scottish Conservative and Unionist Party; 1993 – 1997	Succeeded by Raymond Robertson
