= John Taylor (Dumbarton Burghs MP) =

Member of the U.K. Parliament for Dumbarton Burghs (1857–1936)

- Born: 23 December 1857
- Died: 19 September 1936 (aged 78)
- Occupation: Politician

John Taylor, OBE, JP (23 December 1857 – 19 September 1936) was the member of parliament (MP) for Dumbarton Burghs elected at the 1918 general election, when he narrowly defeated David Kirkwood.

A native of Stirling, he was educated at Cambusbarron Public School and Stirling Art School. A painter and decorator by trade in business at Clydebank from 1888 to 1919, he was a member of the Clydebank Town Council for 25 years and provost for 14 years.

He is usually regarded as a Liberal, although his candidacy was jointly organised by the National Democratic and Labour Party. In the House of Commons, he was a supporter of David Lloyd George's coalition government.

He lost the seat to Kirkwood in 1922, when he stood as a National Liberal, and he did not stand again.

Parliament of the United Kingdom
New constituency	Member of Parliament for Dumbarton Burghs; 1918–1922	Succeeded by David Kirkwood
