= 2021 Lord Speaker election =

House of Lords presiding officer election

- 13–15 April 2021
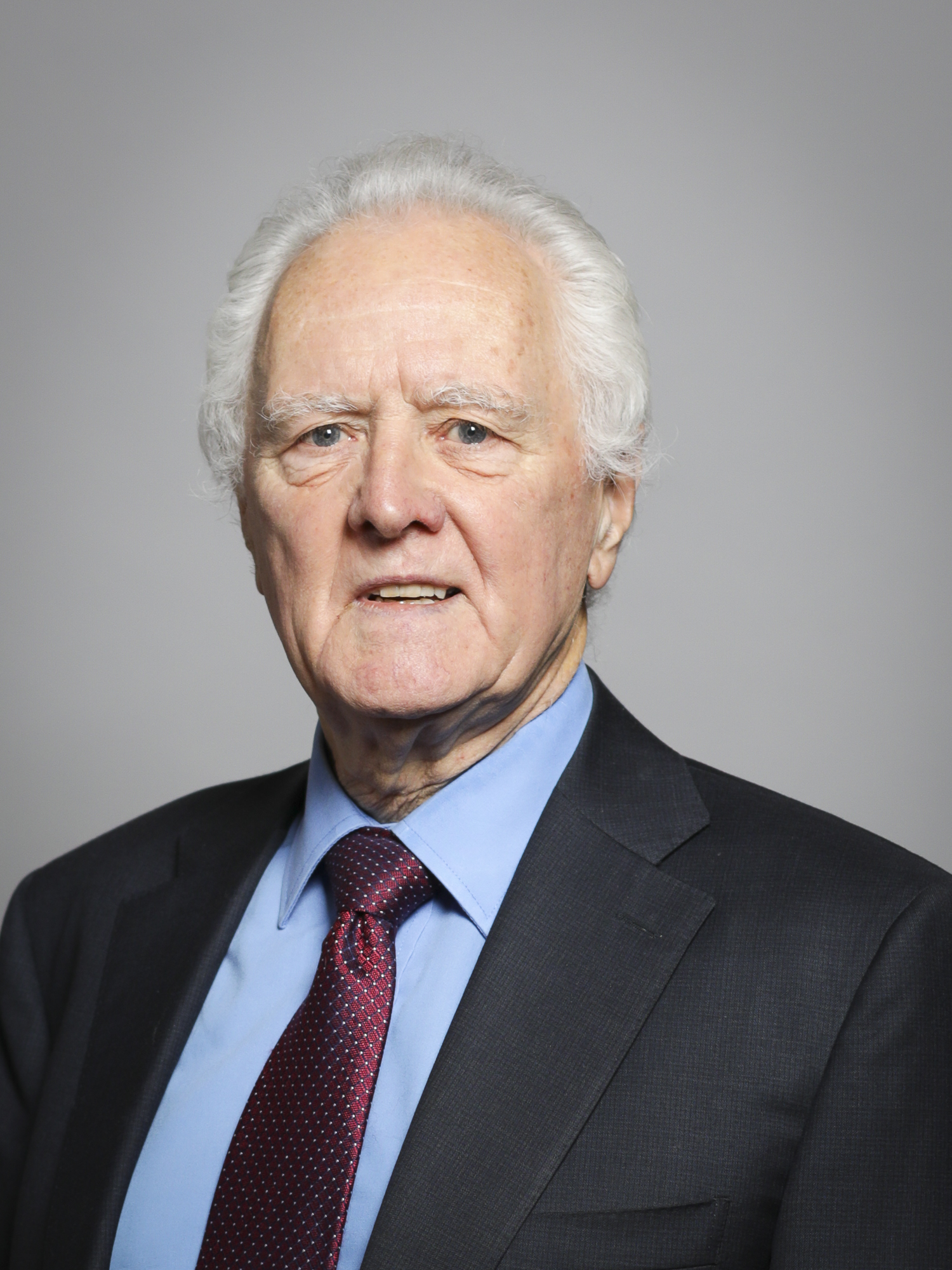

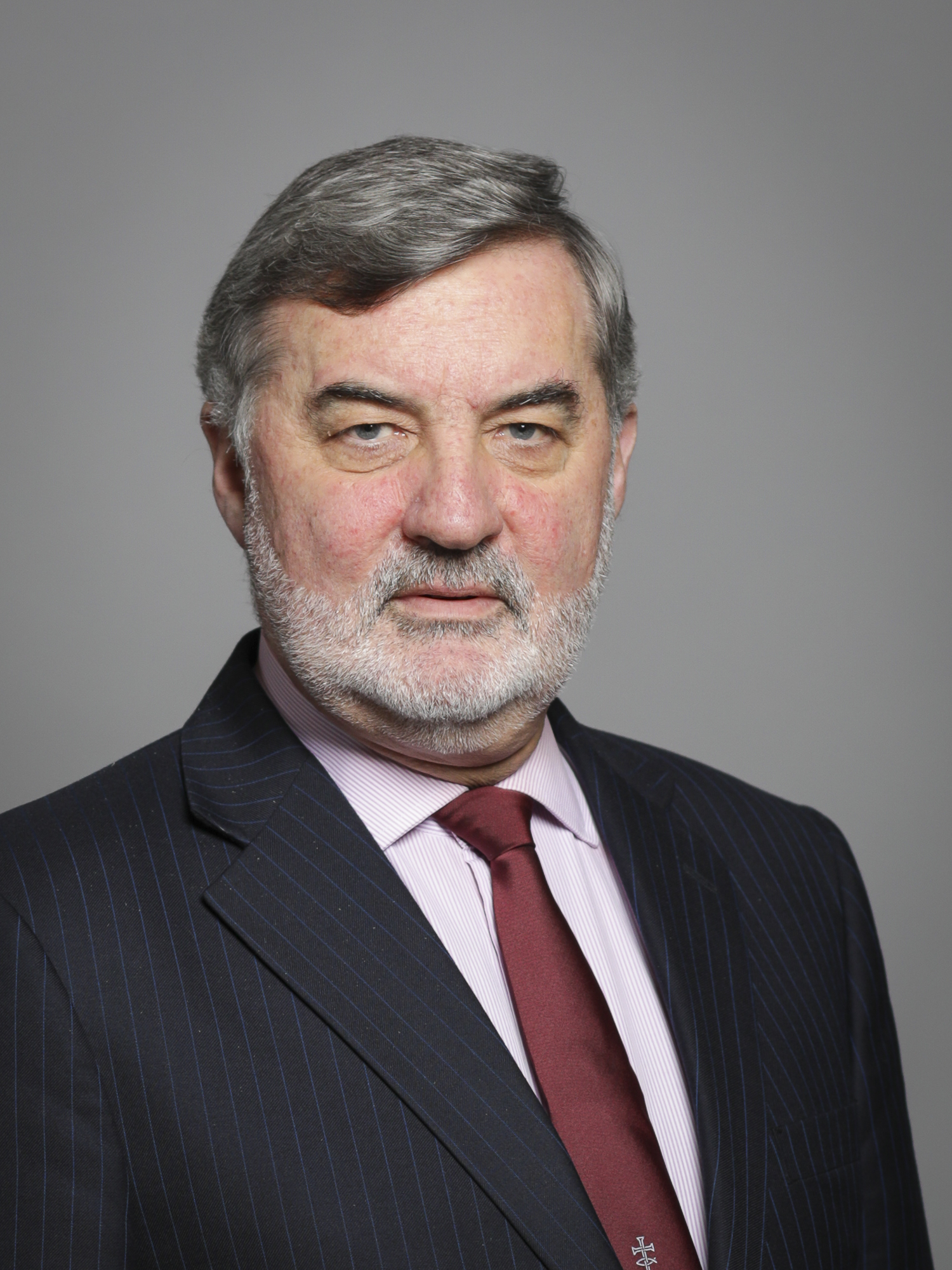

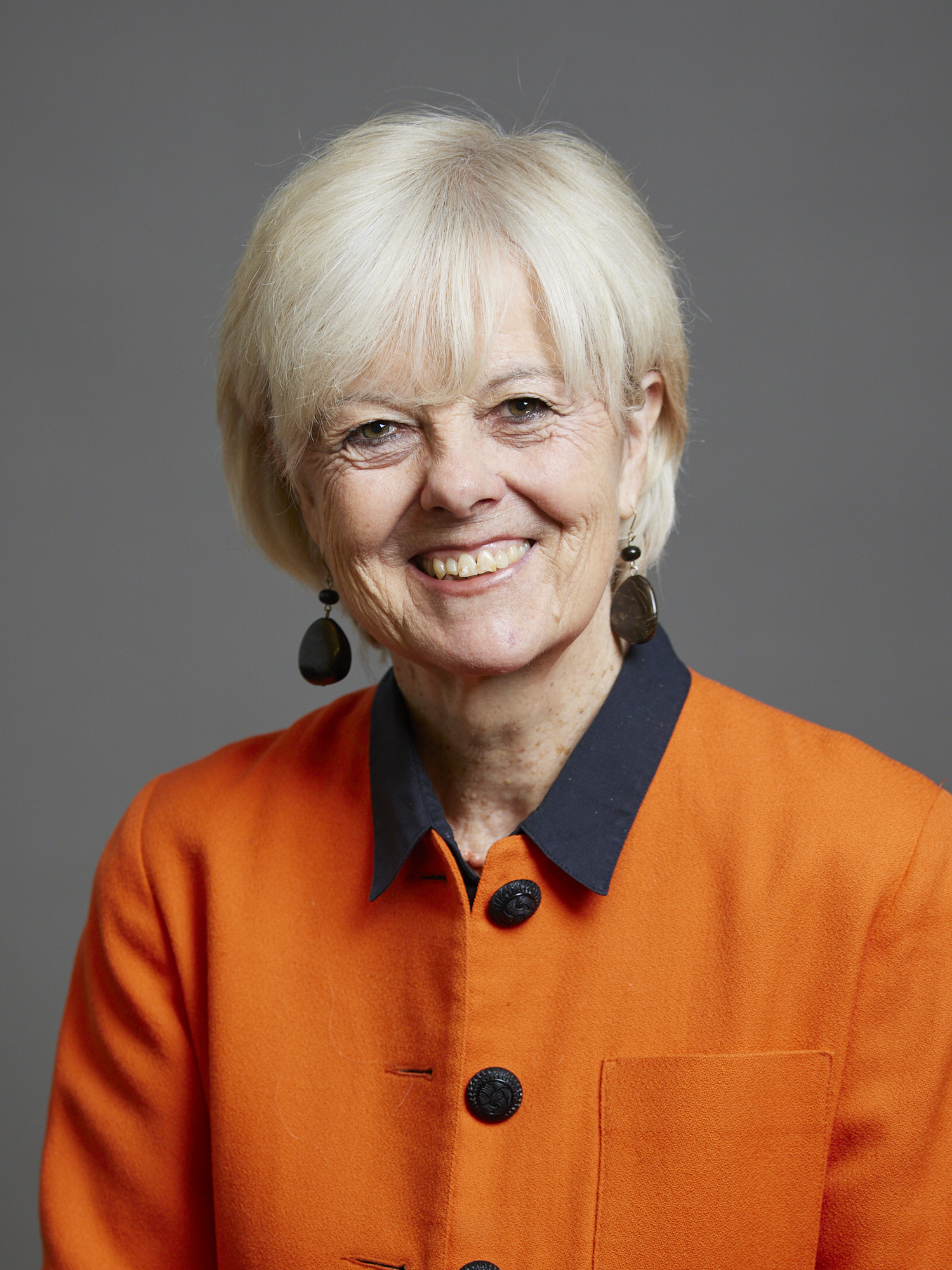
	First party	Second party	Third party
Candidate	The Lord McFall of Alcluith	The Lord; Alderdice	The Baroness Hayter of Kentish Town
Party	Non-affiliated	Liberal Democrats	Labour
First-round vote	241	227	171
Percentage	37.7%	35.5%	26.8%
Second-round vote	336	269	Eliminated
Percentage	55.5%	44.5%	Eliminated
Lord Speaker before election
The Lord Fowler
Elected Lord Speaker
The Lord McFall of Alcluith

An election for Lord Speaker, the presiding officer of the House of Lords, was held from 13 to 15 April 2021. The incumbent, Lord Fowler, announced on 25 February that he would resign from the office in late April, about four months before the end of his first term.

== Election procedure and timetable ==
Members of the House of Lords who wished to stand for election were required to have a proposer and a seconder. The alternative vote system was used in the election and all members who had taken the oath in the then parliament by 25 March 2021 and were not on leave of absence, disqualified or suspended from the House were eligible to stand and to vote. The election was held remotely by postal and online voting.

Timetable was as follows:

- Friday 19 March (12 noon) – Candidate registration and postal voting registration deadline
- Tuesday 23 March – List of candidates published
- Thursday 25 March (2 p.m.) – First virtual hustings event
- Monday 29 March – Ballot papers sent to members requesting a postal vote
- Tuesday 13 April (10 a.m.) – Online voting opened
- Tuesday 13 April (10 a.m.) – Second virtual hustings event
- Thursday 15 April (5 p.m.) – Online voting closed and deadline for postal votes to be returned
- Wednesday 21 April – Results announced and Queen's approval notified
- Thursday 29 April – Old Lord Speaker presiding for the last time (prorogation)
- Saturday 1 May – New Lord Speaker took office
- Tuesday 11 May – New Lord Speaker presiding for the first time (state opening)

== Candidates ==
The following members of the House were registered as candidates:

- The Lord Alderdice (Liberal Democrat)
- The Baroness Hayter of Kentish Town (Labour)
- The Lord McFall of Alcluith (Non-affiliated)

== Result ==
Election of Lord Speaker, 13–15 April 2021
Party	Candidate	Count 1	Count 2
Independent	✓ Lord McFall of Alcluith	241	336
Liberal Democrats	Lord Alderdice	227	269
Labour	Baroness Hayter of Kentish Town	171	-
Electorate: 784 Valid: 639 Quota: 320 Turnout: 639
