= Hugh McMahon (politician) =

Scottish politician

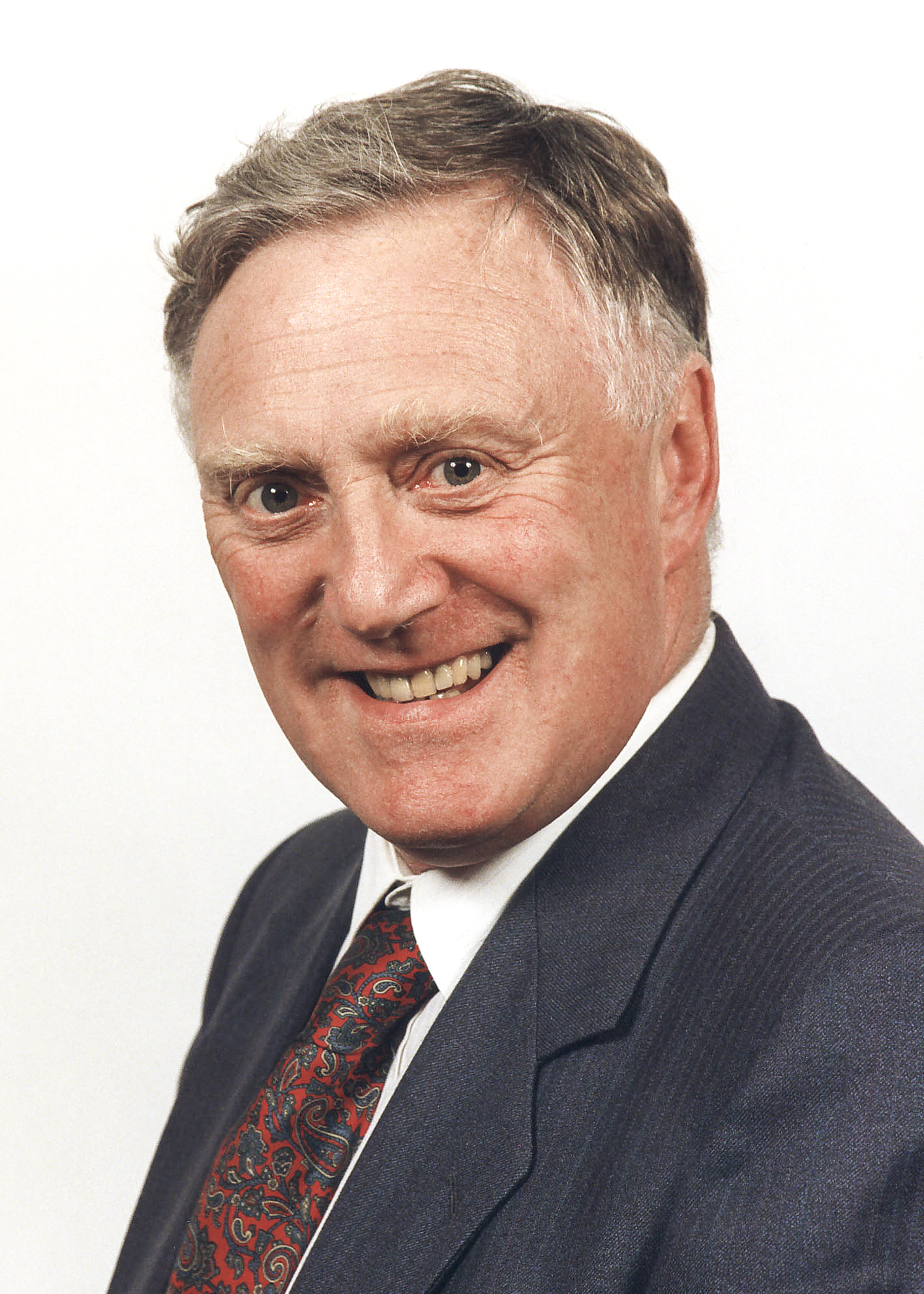
- Official portrait, 1994

Member of the European Parliament for Strathclyde West
- In office 1984 – 20 July 1999
- Preceded by: Adam Fergusson

Personal details
- Born: Hugh Robertson McMahon; 17 June 1938 (age 88) Scotland, United Kingdom
- Party: Labour
- Other political affiliations: Party of European Socialists
- Education: University of Glasgow

Hugh Robertson McMahon (born 17 June 1938) is a former Scottish politician who served as a Member of the European Parliament.

McMahon was educated at Jordanhill College and the University of Glasgow. He became a head teacher, and also became active in the Labour Party, chairing the Socialist Education Association of Scotland from 1978 until 1982, and the Scottish Fabian Society from 1979 until 1984. He also served on the executive of the Scottish Labour Party from 1980 until 1983.

At the 1984 European Parliament election, McMahon was elected for Strathclyde West. He ceased to be an MEP when Euro-constituencies were re-organised in 1999.
