= 1950 West Dunbartonshire by-election =

UK parliamentary by-election

The 1950 West Dunbartonshire by-election of 25 April 1950 was held after the death of Labour MP Adam McKinlay on 17 March 1950.

The seat was marginal, having been won in 1950 by only 613 votes, and remained so following the by-election, with Tom Steele holding the seat for Labour by 293 votes.

== Result of the previous general election ==
General election 1950: West Dunbartonshire
| Party | Candidate | Votes | % | ±% |
|---|---|---|---|---|
| Labour | Adam McKinlay | 20,398 | 49.29 | |
| Conservative | R.A. Allan | 19,785 | 47.81 | |
| Communist | F. Hart | 1,198 | 2.90 | |
| Majority | | 613 | 1.48 | |
| Turnout | | 41,381 | 85.46 | |
| Labour win (new seat) | | | | |

== Result of the by-election ==
By-election 1950: West Dunbartonshire
| Party | Candidate | Votes | % | ±% |
|---|---|---|---|---|
| Labour | Tom Steele | 20,367 | 50.36 | +1.07 |
| Conservative | R.A. Allan | 20,074 | 49.64 | +1.83 |
| Majority | | 293 | 0.72 | −0.76 |
| Turnout | | 40,441 | | |
| Labour hold | | Swing | +0.38 | |

The Glasgow Herald said that while Labour had retained the seat, the party could "take little credit from a victory which was expected to be more pronounced with the aid of the new register and the Loch Sloy vote."
