= Tom Steele (politician) =

Scottish Labour politician

Member of Parliament for Dunbartonshire West
- In office 25 April 1950 – 29 May 1970
- Preceded by: Rt Hon Adam McKinlay
- Succeeded by: Ian Campbell
- Majority: 293

Member of Parliament for Lanark
- In office 5 July 1945 – 3 February 1950
- Preceded by: Lord Dunglass
- Succeeded by: Lord Dunglass

Personal details
- Born: 15 November 1905
- Died: 28 May 1979 (aged 73)
- Party: Labour
- Occupation: Railway station master

Tom Steele (15 November 1905 – 28 May 1979) was a Scottish Labour politician.

Steele worked as a station master and served on the board of the Lanark Co-operative Society.

Steele was elected as Member of Parliament for the constituency of Lanark in 1945, defeating future Prime Minister Lord Dunglass (Alec Douglas-Home), and served as Parliamentary Secretary at the Ministry of National Insurance.

He lost this seat back to Douglas-Home in 1950, but was elected for Dunbartonshire West at a by-election later that year. He held this seat until he retired in 1970, to be replaced by Ian Campbell.

At elections his campaign sometimes used the slogan Vote Steele For Strength.

Parliament of the United Kingdom
Preceded by Lord Dunglass	Member of Parliament for Lanark; 1945 – 1950	Succeeded by Lord Dunglass
Preceded by Adam McKinlay	Member of Parliament for West Dunbartonshire; April 1950 – 1970	Succeeded by Ian Campbell
