= Catherine Monteath =

Scottish painter (1843–1904)

- Born: 19 March 1843; Dunblane, Scotland
- Died: 30 August 1904 (aged 61); Kilmadock, Scotland
- Known for: Paintings of flowers

Catherine Monteath (19 March 1843 – 30 August 1904) was a Scottish painter known for her paintings of flowers.

== Life ==
Catherine Monteath was born in Dunblane to parents John Monteath and Isabella Monteath. She went to Stirling High School, and then went to Stirling Art School.

She stayed at Glenhead Cottage, near Dunblane, in the parish of Kilmadock from 1873.

== Art ==
She first exhibited in the Royal Scottish Academy in 1868 with her Early in Spring.

In 1870 she exhibited two works at the RSA: Hollyhocks and An Old Wall – Study. In 1871 at the RSA another two works were shown: Basket of Summer Fruit and Apple Blossom. In 1872 at the RSA three works were submitted, all of flowers: Camellias – Study, Rhododendrons and Roses. In 1873 she exhibited three works at the RSA: Primroses, Winter Apples and Periwinkles.

She regularly exhibited at the RSA from then to 1898, her last exhibit. Most of the exhibits were of flowers or of Spring and Autumn. One exception is a work exhibited in 1885: Druidical Stones Near Dunblane.

== Death ==
She died on 30 August 1904 and is buried in Dunblane Cathedral churchyard.

The value of her estate at her death was recorded as at £1318, 15 shillings and 5 pence.

== Works ==
Her work Apple Blossom has been auctioned. The inscription on the back of the work says No. 1, indicating that it was her No.1 piece at the RSA exhibition of 1871.
