= John Lyons (British politician) =

British politician

Member of Parliament for Strathkelvin and Bearsden
- In office 7 June 2001 – 11 April 2005
- Preceded by: Sam Galbraith
- Succeeded by: Constituency Abolished

Personal details
- Born: 11 July 1949 (age 77)
- Died: 20 June 2026 Aberfoyle
- Party: Labour

John Lyons (born 11 July 1949) was a Labour Party politician in the United Kingdom.

At the 2001 general election, he was elected to the House of Commons as the member of parliament for Strathkelvin and Bearsden.

Following the reduction in Scottish constituencies in the House of Commons under the Scottish Parliament (Constituencies) Act 2004, that constituency was abolished for the 2005 general election. Lyons stood at the new East Dunbartonshire seat, where he lost to the future Liberal Democrat leader, Jo Swinson.

Following his defeat, he became a consultant on trade unions for FirstGroup.

Before his election to Parliament in 2001, he had worked as a UNISON official.

Lyons consistently voted against and opposed the invasion of Iraq in 2003.

== Death ==
John Lyons passed away whilst completing a charity walk on behalf of Marie Curie, in memory of his late wife, Marion. He was 10 miles into a 13 mile walk when he suffered a heart attack.

Parliament of the United Kingdom
Preceded by Sam Galbraith	Member of Parliament for Strathkelvin and Bearsden; 2001–2005	Succeeded by constituency abolished
