= Baron Kirkwood =

Title in the Peerage of the United Kingdom

Baron Kirkwood, of Bearsden in the County of Dunbarton, is a title in the Peerage of the United Kingdom. It was created in 1951 for the Scottish engineer, trade unionist, Independent Labour Party and later Labour politician David Kirkwood. The title is currently held by his grandson James, the fourth baron, who succeeded his brother David in 2023.

== Baron Kirkwood (1951) ==
- David Kirkwood, 1st Baron Kirkwood (1872–1955)
- David Kirkwood, 2nd Baron Kirkwood (1903–1970)
- David Harvie Kirkwood, 3rd Baron Kirkwood (1931–2023)
- James Stuart Kirkwood, 4th Baron Kirkwood (born 1937)

The heir presumptive is the present holder's first cousin once removed, Douglas James Kirkwood (born 1974).

=== Title succession chart ===
Title succession chart, Barons Kirkwood

David Kirkwood; 1st Baron Kirkwood; 1872–1955
John Kirkwood; 1900–1942	Robert Kirkwood; 1901–1950	David Kirkwood; 2nd Baron Kirkwood; 1903–1970	Hon. James Kirkwood; 1912–1983
David Kirkwood; 3rd Baron Kirkwood; 1931–2023	James Kirkwood; 4th Baron Kirkwood born 1937	Col. David Kirkwood; 1945–2020
Douglas Kirkwood born 1974

=== Line of succession ===
- David Kirkwood, 1st Baron Kirkwood (1872–1955)
  - David Kirkwood, 2nd Baron Kirkwood (1903–1970)
    - David Harvie Kirkwood, 3rd Baron Kirkwood (1931–2023)
    - James Stuart Kirkwood, 4th Baron Kirkwood (born 1937)
  - Hon. James Smith Kirkwood (1912–1983)
    - Col. David Kirkwood (1945–2020)
      - (1) Douglas James Kirkwood (born 1974)
      - (2) David Angus Kirkwood (born 1978)
      - (3) Robert Cameron Kirkwood (born 1981)
    - (4) James Marshall Smith Kirkwood (born 1954)

Coat of arms of Baron Kirkwood
Crest The bow of a ship affrontée Proper. Escutcheon Argent two chevronels round-embattled on their upper edges Sable between two oak sprigs slipped and fructed Proper in chief and a cog-wheel Azure in base. Supporters Dexter an Ayrshire bull sinister a Clydesdale stallion both Proper the latter harnessed Or. Motto Men Dare Whatever They Can Do

== See also ==
- Archibald Kirkwood, Baron Kirkwood of Kirkhope

== Sources ==
- Kidd, Charles, Williamson, David (editors). Debrett's Peerage and Baronetage (1990 edition). New York: St Martin's Press, 1990,
- Leigh Rayment's Peerage Pages
