= East Dunbartonshire (UK Parliament constituency) =

UK Parliament constituency (1950–1983; 2005–2024)

Coordinates: 55.976°N 4.211°W

- Former county constituency for the House of Commons
- Boundary of East Dunbartonshire in Scotland
- Local government in East Dunbartonshire: East Dunbartonshire
- Major settlements: Bearsden, Bishopbriggs, Milngavie

2005–2024
- Seats: One
- Created from: Strathkelvin & Bearsden; Clydebank & Milngavie; Coatbridge & Chryston
- Replaced by: Mid Dunbartonshire

1950–1983
- Seats: One
- Type of constituency: County constituency
- Created from: Dunbartonshire; Dumbarton Burghs
- Replaced by: Strathkelvin & Bearsden and Cumbernauld and Kilsyth

East Dunbartonshire was a county constituency of the House of Commons of the Parliament of the United Kingdom (Westminster). It elected one Member of Parliament (MP) by the first past the post system of election. The seat is possibly best known for formerly being the constituency of Jo Swinson, the former Leader of the Liberal Democrats who was defeated at the 2019 general election.

This version of the constituency was first used at the 2005 general election. There was also an earlier East Dunbartonshire constituency, from 1950 to 1983.

Further to the completion of the 2023 review of Westminster constituencies, the seat was expanded and renamed Mid Dunbartonshire, and was first contested at the 2024 general election.

== Constituency profile ==
The constituency covered the northern edge of Greater Glasgow, and included commuter towns on the North Clyde and Croy railway corridors.

Since 1974, the constituency had had the unusual distinction of having been represented by all four of the main political parties in Scotland, typically with small majorities (under 10%) at each general election.

== Boundaries ==
Map of boundaries 2005–2024

=== 2005–2024 ===
The existing constituency was created as a result of the Fifth Periodical Review of the Boundary Commission for Scotland, as one of two covering the East Dunbartonshire council area and one of five covering the East Dunbartonshire council area and the North Lanarkshire council area.

The East Dunbartonshire constituency was entirely within the East Dunbartonshire council area, and the rest of the council area was covered by the Cumbernauld, Kilsyth and Kirkintilloch East constituency, which also covered part of the North Lanarkshire council area. The rest of the North Lanarkshire area was covered by the Airdrie and Shotts, Coatbridge, Chryston and Bellshill, and Motherwell and Wishaw constituencies.

The East Dunbartonshire constituency replaced most of the Strathkelvin and Bearsden constituency and some of the Clydebank and Milngavie constituency and some of the Coatbridge and Chryston constituency.

The Fifth Periodical Review did not affect the boundaries of Scottish Parliament constituencies, which retained the boundaries of Westminster constituencies prior to implementation of the results of the review.

=== Historic ===
The historic constituency was created under the House of Commons (Redistribution of Seats) Act 1949, and first used in the 1950 general election.

As created in 1950, the constituency was one of two covering the county of Dunbarton. The other was West Dunbartonshire. The two new constituencies replaced the earlier constituencies of Dunbartonshire and Dumbarton Burghs.

East Dunbartonshire covered the Cumbernauld, Kirkintilloch, and New Kilpatrick districts of the county and the burghs of Clydebank, Kirkintilloch, and Milngavie.

For the 1951 general election the constituency boundaries were adjusted to take account of a change to the boundaries of the burgh of Clydebank.

The results of the First Periodical Review of the Boundary Commission were implemented for the 1955 general election, but there was no change to the boundaries of East Dunbartonshire, and the boundaries of 1951 and 1955 were used also in the general elections of 1959, 1964, 1966 and 1970.

The results of the Second Periodical Review were implemented for the February 1974 general election. The review took account of population growth in the county of Dunbarton, caused by overspill from the city of Glasgow into the new town of Cumbernauld and elsewhere,caused by overspill from the city of Glasgow into the new town of Cumbernauld and elsewhere, and East Dunbartonshire became one of three constituencies covering the county. East Dunbartonshire now covered the Kirkintilloch and Cumbernauld districts of the county and the burghs of Bearsden, Cumbernauld, and Kirkintilloch, but it lost Clydebank and Milngavie to the new constituency of Central Dunbartonshire. These boundaries were used also for the general elections of October 1974 and 1979.

In 1975, under the Local Government (Scotland) Act 1973, Scottish counties were abolished in favour of regions and districts and islands council areas, and the county of Dunbarton was divided between several districts of the new region of Strathclyde. The Third Periodical Review took account of new local government boundaries, and the results were implemented for the 1983 general election.

== Members of Parliament ==
Election	Member	Party
1950	David Kirkwood	Labour
1951	Cyril Bence	Labour
1970	Hugh McCartney	Labour
Feb 1974	Barry Henderson	Conservative
Oct 1974	Margaret Bain	SNP
1979	Norman Hogg	Labour
1983	constituency abolished	
2005	Jo Swinson	Liberal Democrats
2015	John Nicolson	SNP
2017	Jo Swinson	Liberal Democrats
2019	Amy Callaghan	SNP
2024	constituency abolished see Mid Dunbartonshire	

== Election results ==
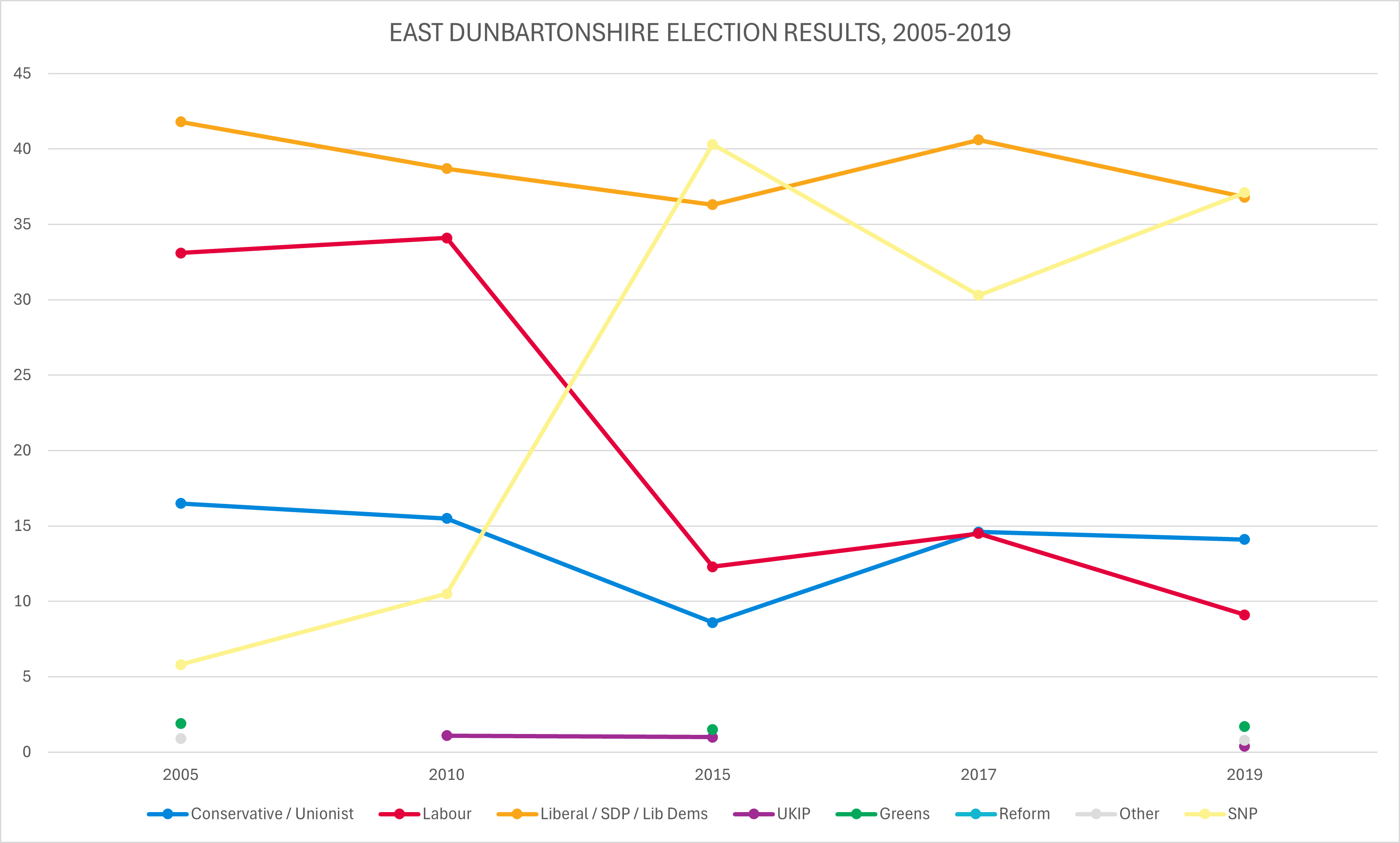
Election results 2005-2019

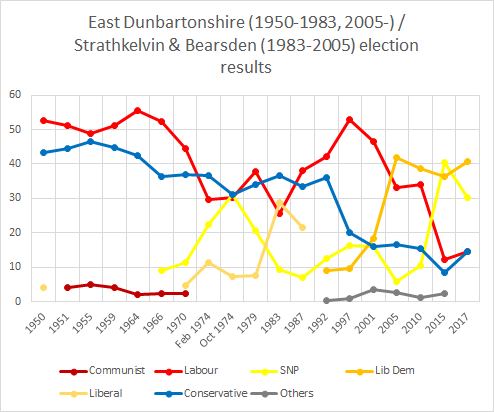
East Dunbartonshire election history

=== Elections in the 2010s ===
General election 2019: East Dunbartonshire
Party	Candidate	Votes	%	±%
SNP	Amy Callaghan	19,672	37.1	▲6.8
Liberal Democrats	Jo Swinson	19,523	36.8	▼3.8
Conservative	Pam Gosal	7,455	14.1	▼0.5
Labour	Callum McNally	4,839	9.1	▼5.4
Green	Carolynn Scrimgeour	916	1.7	New
Independent	Rosie Dickson	221	0.4	New
UKIP	Donald MacKay	208	0.4	New
Scottish Family	Liam McKechnie	197	0.4	New
Majority		149	0.3	N/A
Turnout		53,031	80.3	▲1.5
SNP gain from Liberal Democrats		Swing	▲5.3	

This was the largest constituency turnout, and the smallest SNP majority, at the 2019 general election.

General election 2017: East Dunbartonshire
Party	Candidate	Votes	%	±%
Liberal Democrats	Jo Swinson	21,023	40.6	▲4.3
SNP	John Nicolson	15,684	30.3	▼10.0
Conservative	Sheila Mechan	7,563	14.6	▲6.0
Labour	Callum McNally	7,531	14.5	▲2.2
Majority		5,339	10.3	N/A
Turnout		51,801	78.8	▼3.1
Liberal Democrats gain from SNP		Swing	▲7.2	

General election 2015: East Dunbartonshire
Party	Candidate	Votes	%	±%
SNP	John Nicolson	22,093	40.3	▲29.8
Liberal Democrats	Jo Swinson	19,926	36.3	▼2.4
Labour	Amanjit Jhund	6,754	12.3	▼21.8
Conservative	Andrew Polson	4,727	8.6	▼6.9
Green	Ross Greer	804	1.5	New
UKIP	Wilfred Arasaratnam	567	1.0	▼0.1
Majority		2,167	4.0	N/A
Turnout		54,871	81.9^{1}	▲6.7
SNP gain from Liberal Democrats		Swing	▲16.0	

^{1} This was the highest turnout in the May 2015 general election.

General election 2010: East Dunbartonshire
Party	Candidate	Votes	%	±%
Liberal Democrats	Jo Swinson	18,551	38.7	▼3.1
Labour	Mary Galbraith	16,367	34.1	▲1.0
Conservative	Mark Nolan	7,431	15.5	▼1.0
SNP	Iain White	5,054	10.5	▲4.7
UKIP	James Beeley	545	1.1	New
Majority		2,184	4.6	▼4.1
Turnout		47,948	75.2	▲2.1
Liberal Democrats hold		Swing	▼2.1	

=== Elections in the 2000s ===
General election 2005: East Dunbartonshire
Party	Candidate	Votes	%	±%
Liberal Democrats	Jo Swinson	19,533	41.8	+14.7
Labour	John Lyons	15,472	33.1	−0.2
Conservative	David Jack	7,708	16.5	−6.0
SNP	Chris Sagan	2,716	5.8	−8.9
Green	Stuart Callison	876	1.9	New
Scottish Socialist	Pamela Page	419	0.9	−1.5
Majority		4,061	8.7	N/A
Turnout		46,724	73.1	+10.1
Liberal Democrats gain from Labour		Swing	+7.4	

UK General Election, 2001 Notional Result: East Dunbartonshire
Party	Candidate	Votes	%	±%
Labour		13,792	33.3	
Liberal Democrats		11,191	27.1	
Conservative		9,290	22.5	
SNP		6,099	14.7	
Scottish Socialist		1,006	2.4	
Majority		2,601	6.2	
Labour hold		Swing		

The constituency of 1950 to 1983 has an unusual electoral history, in that in two consecutive general elections it was gained by the party in third place at the previous election. In October 1974 the SNP leapfrogged Labour to defeat the Conservatives, and in 1979 Labour leapfrogged the Conservatives to beat the SNP. Furthermore, the constituency went the opposite way to the nation in two consecutive changes of government. In February 1974, the Conservatives gained it from Labour, though losing nationally, while in 1979 Labour regained the seat from the SNP, though losing nationally. Apart from Ynys Môn in Wales, East Dunbartonshire is the only seat to have been represented by the three main parties and the nationalists.

=== Elections in the 1970s ===
General election 1979: East Dunbartonshire
Party	Candidate	Votes	%	±%
Labour	Norman Hogg	23,268	37.9	+7.6
Conservative	Michael Hirst	20,944	34.1	+2.9
SNP	Margaret Bain	12,654	20.6	−10.6
Liberal	R Waddell	4,600	7.5	+0.2
Majority		2,324	3.8	N/A
Turnout		61,466	83.9	+3.3
Labour gain from SNP		Swing		

The October 1974 result was particularly unusual since it produced both the smallest majority in the country at that election, and the closest three-way result since 1945.

General election October 1974: East Dunbartonshire
Party	Candidate	Votes	%	±%
SNP	Margaret Bain	15,551	31.2	+8.9
Conservative	Barry Henderson	15,529	31.2	−5.5
Labour	Edward McGarry	15,122	30.3	+0.7
Liberal	Alan Thompson	3,636	7.3	−4.1
Majority		22	0.0	N/A
Turnout		49,838	80.6	−4.4
SNP gain from Conservative		Swing		

General election February 1974: East Dunbartonshire
Party	Candidate	Votes	%	±%
Conservative	Barry Henderson	19,092	36.7	−0.3
Labour	Edward McGarry	15,416	29.6	−15.0
SNP	Margaret Bain	11,635	22.3	+11.0
Liberal	J. Cameron	5,936	11.4	+6.6
Majority		3,676	7.1	N/A
Turnout		52,079	85.0	+7.4
Conservative gain from Labour		Swing		

General election 1970: East Dunbartonshire
Party	Candidate	Votes	%	±%
Labour	Hugh McCartney	32,527	44.6	−7.5
Conservative	Barry Henderson	26,972	37.0	+0.6
SNP	Gordon Murray	8,257	11.3	+2.3
Liberal	James G Brown	3,460	4.8	New
Communist	Jimmy Reid	1,656	2.3	−0.1
Majority		5,555	7.6	−8.2
Turnout		72,872	77.6	−3.0
Labour hold		Swing		

=== Elections in the 1960s ===
General election 1966: East Dunbartonshire
Party	Candidate	Votes	%	±%
Labour	Cyril Bence	32,988	52.15	
Conservative	Kenneth B Miller	23,001	36.36	
SNP	William Johnston	5,715	9.04	New
Communist	Jimmy Reid	1,548	2.45	
Majority		9,987	15.79	
Turnout		63,252	80.62	
Labour hold		Swing		

General election 1964: East Dunbartonshire
Party	Candidate	Votes	%	±%
Labour	Cyril Bence	32,948	55.60	
Unionist	T Warren Strachan	25,137	42.42	
Communist	Jimmy Reid	1,171	1.98	
Majority		7,811	13.18	
Turnout		59,256	81.70	
Labour hold		Swing		

=== Elections in the 1950s ===
General election 1959: East Dunbartonshire
Party	Candidate	Votes	%	±%
Labour	Cyril Bence	27,942	51.05	
Unionist	David Anderson	24,593	44.93	
Communist	Arnold E Henderson	2,200	4.02	
Majority		3,349	6.12	
Turnout		54,735	84.26	
Labour hold		Swing		

General election 1955: East Dunbartonshire
Party	Candidate	Votes	%	±%
Labour	Cyril Bence	24,216	48.68	
Unionist	Norman Macleod Glen	23,086	46.40	
Communist	Arnold E Henderson	2,448	4.92	
Majority		1,130	2.28	
Turnout		49,750	81.55	
Labour hold		Swing		

General election 1951: East Dunbartonshire
Party	Candidate	Votes	%	±%
Labour	Cyril Bence	26,678	51.22	
Unionist	William Whitelaw	23,252	44.64	
Communist	Arnold E Henderson	2,158	4.14	New
Majority		3,426	6.58	
Turnout		52,088	86.83	
Labour hold		Swing		

General election 1950: East Dunbartonshire
Party	Candidate	Votes	%	±%
Labour	David Kirkwood	25,943	52.7	
Unionist	William Whitelaw	21,367	43.4	
Liberal	Charles E Forrester	1,952	4.0	
Majority		4,576	9.3	
Turnout		49,262	86.0	
Labour win (new seat)				
