= David Kirkwood =

Scottish politician, trade unionist and socialist activist (1872–1955)

The Right Honourable The Lord Kirkwood PC
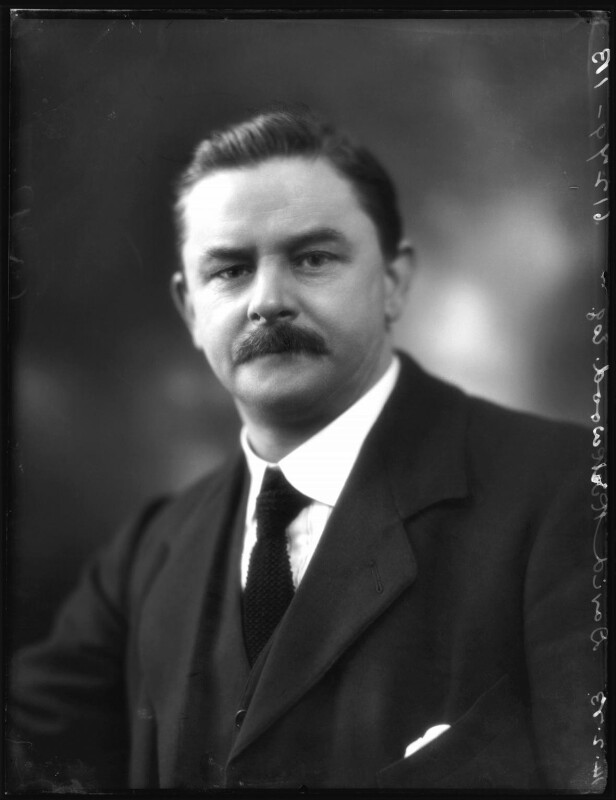
- Kirwood in 1923

Member of Parliament
- In office 15 November 1922 – 4 October 1951
- Preceded by: John Taylor
- Succeeded by: Cyril Bence
- Constituency: Dumbarton Burghs (1922–1950); East Dunbartonshire (1950–1951)

Personal details
- Born: 8 July 1872 Parkhead, Glasgow, Scotland
- Died: 16 April 1955 (aged 82) Glasgow, Scotland
- Party: Socialist Labour (until 1914); Independent Labour (1914–1932); Scottish Socialist (1932–1940); Labour (from 1940)
- Spouse: Elizabeth Smith (m. 1899)

David Kirkwood, 1st Baron Kirkwood, PC (8 July 1872 – 16 April 1955), was a Scottish politician, trade unionist and socialist activist from the East End of Glasgow, who served as a Member of Parliament (MP) for nearly 30 years, and was as a leading figure of the Red Clydeside era.

== Biography ==
Kirkwood was born in Glasgow to John Kirkwood, a labourer, and his wife Jean. Kirkwood was educated at Parkhead Public School, but left at age 12 to take employment, and was trained as an engineer. Kirkwood's earliest political involvement was through his trade union, the Amalgamated Society of Engineers (which he joined at age 20), and the Socialist Labour Party, which he left in 1914 to join the Independent Labour Party (ILP). He was recognised as the Scottish engineers' leader for many years.

Kirkwood served on the Glasgow Trade Council and was a member of the Clyde Workers' Committee (CWC) chaired by Willie Gallacher. The CWC grew out of the Clyde engineers' pay dispute of 1915. Until its effective suppression in early-1916, it organised shop floor opposition to the policies of the Ministry of Munitions with regard to Leaving Certificates and Dilution of Labour. Kirkwood was the convenor of shop stewards at Parkhead Forge of William Beardmore and Company, where, in January 1916 he helped to secure a dilution agreement.

In March 1916, as a result of a strike related to the implementation of the agreement, Kirkwood was arrested and deported from Glasgow to Edinburgh, an event which greatly increased his profile. He returned to Glasgow in 1917, and was employed as foreman at the Mile-End Shell Factory.

In January 1919, Kirkwood was prominently associated with the 40 Hours' Strike. Batoned and arrested along with Willie Gallacher and Manny Shinwell, at a riot in George Square, Glasgow, he was tried for incitement to riot and acquitted. At the 1922 general election, Kirkwood was elected as Member of Parliament (MP) for Dumbarton Burghs. He had previously served for four years on Glasgow Town Council. On 9 May 1924 the Speaker of the House of Commons adjourned the debate when Kirkwood and James Maxton caused an uproar after the Opposition talked out George Buchanan's Scottish Home Rule Bill.

Kirkwood was one of the leading figures of the ILP in Parliament as it came into increasing conflict with the Labour Party. At the 1931 general election, he was returned as one of five ILP MPs without Labour Party support. However, when the ILP, with the support of James Maxton, decided to disaffiliate from the Labour Party in 1932 this was a step too far for Kirkwood, and he left the ILP to join the new Scottish Socialist Party and again took the Labour Party whip. Kirkwood published his autobiography, My Life of Revolt in 1935.

In January 1931, the ocean liner Queen Mary was laid down in Kirkwood's constituency on the Clydebank by John Brown & Company for the Cunard Line. However, work was halted due to lack of funds and the workers were made redundant on 11 December. Kirkwood campaigned throughout 1932 to save the ship and he enlisted the help of the Prince of Wales. His campaign succeeded when the UK Government passed the North Atlantic Shipping Act 1934, which included a government loan to the company of £9,500,000 and the Queen Mary was completed in 1934.

£5 million of the government's loan was intended for the Queen Mary's sister ship, the Queen Elizabeth. When the Queen Elizabeth was laid down in 1936, the chairman of Cunard, Percy Bates, wrote to Kirkwood: "Your share in the responsibility is perhaps larger than you might expect. They might not have had the courage to borrow the money but for your belief in the men of the Clyde".

Kirkwood was a supporter of Home rule for Scotland. In 1935, Gilbert McAllister said that Kirkwood, "courteous to all men but bowing to none, divides his affections among porridge and politics, the Bible and Burns, Scottish Home Rule and Socialism, his family and "ma people in Clydebank".

Kirkwood became a Privy Counsellor in 1948. When his constituency was abolished at the 1950 general election, he was elected for the new constituency of East Dunbartonshire. He left the Commons in 1951 and was created Baron Kirkwood of Bearsden, on 22 December 1951. Kirkwood died on 16 April 1955, at the age of 82.

== Arms ==
Coat of arms of David Kirkwood
Crest The bow of a ship affrontée Proper. Escutcheon Argent two chevronels round-embattled on their upper edges Sable between two oak sprigs slipped and fructed Proper in chief and a cog-wheel Azure in base. Supporters Dexter an Ayrshire bull sinister a Clydesdale stallion both Proper the latter harnessed Or. Motto Men Dare Whatever They Can Do

Parliament of the United Kingdom
Preceded by John Taylor	Member of Parliament for Dumbarton Burghs; 1922–1950	Constituency abolished
New constituency	Member of Parliament for Dunbartonshire East; 1950–1951	Succeeded by Cyril Bence
Peerage of the United Kingdom
New creation	Baron Kirkwood; 1951–1955	Succeeded by David Kirkwood
