= Strathkelvin and Bearsden (UK Parliament constituency) =

UK Parliament constituency (1983–2005)

- Former county constituency for the House of Commons
- Boundary of Strathkelvin and Bearsden in Scotland for the 2001 general election

1983–2005
- Seats: One
- Created from: East Dunbartonshire, North Lanarkshire and West Stirlingshire
- Replaced by: East Dunbartonshire; Cumbernauld, Kilsyth & Kirkintilloch East

Strathkelvin and Bearsden was a parliamentary constituency represented in the House of Commons of the Parliament of the United Kingdom from 1983. In 2005, the constituency was abolished, and the area since 2024 is now represented by Mid Dunbartonshire and Cumbernauld and Kirkintilloch.

The Scottish Parliament constituency of Strathkelvin and Bearsden, which covered the same area, continues in existence.

== Boundaries ==
1983–1997: The Strathclyde Regional Council electoral divisions of Bearsden, Bishopbriggs, Kirkintilloch and the Bearsden & Milngavie District electoral division of Kilmardinny.

1997–2005: The Strathclyde Regional Council electoral divisions of Bearsden, Bishopbriggs, Kirkintilloch and Strathkelvin North.

== Members of Parliament ==
Election	Member	Party
1983	Michael Hirst	Conservative
1987	Sam Galbraith	Labour
2001	John Lyons	Labour
2005	constituency abolished: see East Dunbartonshire & Cumbernauld, Kilsyth and Kirkintilloch East	

== Election results ==
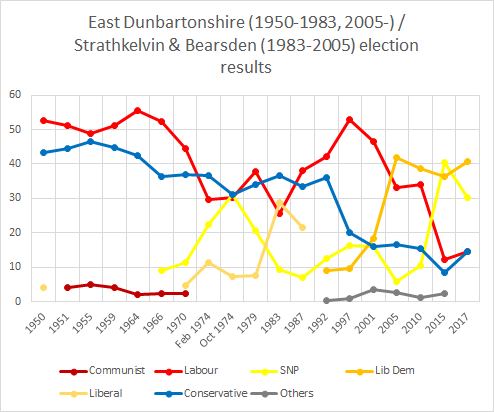
East Dunbartonshire election history

=== Elections of the 1980s ===
General election 1983: Strathkelvin and Bearsden
Party	Candidate	Votes	%	±%
Conservative	Michael Hirst	17,501	36.5	−10.0
Liberal	Ronald Waddell	13,801	28.7	+18.5
Labour	Adam Ingram	12,308	25.6	−4.8
SNP	Margaret Bain	4,408	9.2	−3.7
Majority		3,700	7.8	
Turnout		48,018	79.4	
Conservative win (new seat)				

General election 1987: Strathkelvin and Bearsden
Party	Candidate	Votes	%	±%
Labour	Sam Galbraith	19,639	38.1	+12.5
Conservative	Michael Hirst	17,187	33.4	−3.1
Liberal	Jim Bannerman	11,034	21.4	−7.3
SNP	Gil Paterson	3,654	7.1	−2.1
Majority		2,452	4.7	N/A
Turnout		51,514	82.2	+2.8
Labour gain from Conservative		Swing		

=== Elections of the 1990s ===
General election 1992: Strathkelvin and Bearsden
Party	Candidate	Votes	%	±%
Labour	Sam Galbraith	21,267	42.2	+4.1
Conservative	Michael Hirst	18,105	36.0	+2.6
SNP	Thomas Chalmers	6,275	12.5	+5.4
Liberal Democrats	Barbara Waterfield	4,585	9.1	−12.3
Natural Law	David Whitley	90	0.2	New
Majority		3,162	6.2	+1.5
Turnout		50,322	82.2	0.0
Labour hold		Swing	−0.8	

General election 1997: Strathkelvin and Bearsden
Party	Candidate	Votes	%	±%
Labour	Sam Galbraith	26,278	52.9	+6.8
Conservative	David Sharpe	9,986	20.1	−12.5
SNP	Graeme McCormick	8,111	16.3	+3.4
Liberal Democrats	John Morrison	4,843	9.7	+1.5
Referendum	David Wilson	339	0.7	New
Natural Law	Christine Fisher	155	0.3	+0.1
Majority		16,292	32.8	+19.3
Turnout		49,712	78.8	−4.9
Labour hold		Swing	+4.1	

=== Elections of the 2000s ===
General election 2001: Strathkelvin and Bearsden
Party	Candidate	Votes	%	±%
Labour	John Lyons	19,250	46.4	−6.5
Liberal Democrats	Gordon McDonald	7,533	18.2	+8.5
SNP	Calum Smith	6,675	16.1	−0.2
Conservative	William Roxburgh	6,635	16.0	−4.1
Scottish Socialist	Willie Telfer	1,393	3.4	New
Majority		11,717	28.2	−4.6
Turnout		41,486	66.0	−12.8
Labour hold		Swing		
