= Advanced postgraduate =

In a few universities in the United Kingdom, an advanced postgraduate (APG) is student enrolled in the first year (full-time) or first two years (part-time) of a PhD program. During this period, students usually research their particular research area for unanswered or unclear research questions or topics. The university also assesses whether the student is suitable to complete a PhD.

At the end of this period, students are required to submit a report regarding the direction of their research during the remainder of their PhD. They usually present the report at a panel interview, called the APG interview.
