= Dumbarton (UK Parliament constituency) =

UK Parliament constituency (1983–2005)

- Former burgh constituency for the House of Commons
- Boundary of Dumbarton in Scotland for the 2001 general election
- Major settlements: Dumbarton, Helensburgh

1983–2005
- Seats: one
- Replaced by: West Dumbartonshire

Dumbarton was a burgh constituency represented in the House of Commons of the Parliament of the United Kingdom from 1983 until 2005. It was largely absorbed into the new constituency of West Dunbartonshire, with Helensburgh joining Argyll and Bute.

The Dumbarton constituency of the Scottish Parliament, which was created in 1999 with the same boundaries, continues to exist.

The seat saw two MPs in its existence, Ian Campbell and John McFall, both of whom represented the West Dunbartonshire seat before and after respectively.

== Boundaries ==
It consisted of the towns of Dumbarton, the Vale of Leven, and Helensburgh, plus a significant rural hinterland.

== Members of Parliament ==
Election	Member	Party
1983	Ian Campbell	Labour
1987	John McFall	Labour Co-operative
2005	constituency abolished	

== Election results ==
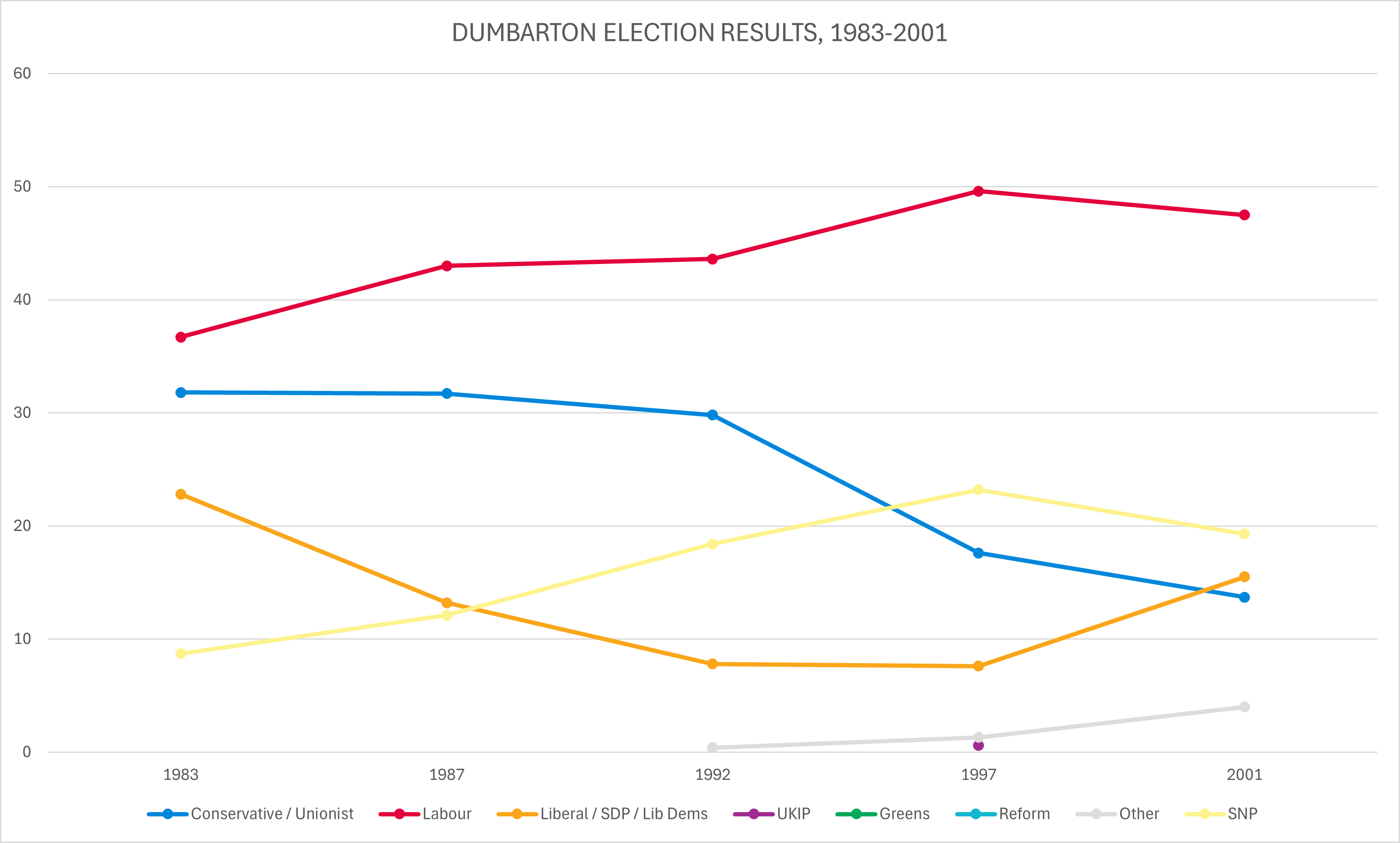
Election results 1983-2001

=== Elections of the 1980s ===
General election 1983: Dumbarton
Party	Candidate	Votes	%	±%
Labour	Ian Campbell	15,810	36.7	−11.6
Conservative	Iain Lawson	13,695	31.8	−2.0
SDP	Robert Sawyer	9,813	22.8	New
SNP	Ian Bayne	3,768	8.7	−9.1
Majority		2,115	4.9	−9.6
Turnout		43,086	75.1	
Labour win (new seat)				

General election 1987: Dumbarton
Party	Candidate	Votes	%	±%
Labour Co-op	John McFall	19,778	43.0	+6.3
Conservative	Robert Graham	14,556	31.7	−0.1
SDP	Richard Mowbray	6,060	13.2	−9.6
SNP	Jenny Herriot	5,564	12.1	+3.4
Majority		5,222	11.3	+6.4
Turnout		45,958	77.9	+2.8
Labour Co-op hold		Swing	+3.2	

=== Elections of the 1990s ===
General election 1992: Dumbarton
Party	Candidate	Votes	%	±%
Labour Co-op	John McFall	19,255	43.6	+0.6
Conservative	Thomas Begg	13,126	29.8	−1.9
SNP	Bill McKechnie	8,127	18.4	+6.3
Liberal Democrats	John Morrison	3,425	7.8	−5.4
Natural Law	Diana Krass	192	0.4	New
Majority		6,129	13.8	+2.5
Turnout		44,125	77.1	−0.8
Labour Co-op hold		Swing	+1.3	

General election 1997: Dumbarton
Party	Candidate	Votes	%	±%
Labour Co-op	John McFall	20,470	49.6	+6.0
SNP	William McKechnie	9,587	23.2	+6.8
Conservative	Peter Ramsay	7,283	17.6	−12.2
Liberal Democrats	Alan Reid	3,144	7.6	−0.2
Scottish Socialist	Leslie Robertson	283	0.7	New
Referendum	George Dempster	255	0.6	New
UKIP	Robert Lancaster	242	0.6	New
Majority		10,883	26.4	+12.6
Turnout		41,264	73.4	−3.7
Labour Co-op hold		Swing		

=== Elections of the 2000s ===
General election 2001: Dumbarton
Party	Candidate	Votes	%	±%
Labour Co-op	John McFall	16,151	47.5	−2.1
SNP	Iain Robertson	6,576	19.3	−3.9
Liberal Democrats	Eric Thompson	5,265	15.5	+7.9
Conservative	Peter Ramsay	4,648	13.7	−3.9
Scottish Socialist	Leslie Robertson	1,354	4.0	+3.3
Majority		9,575	28.2	+1.8
Turnout		33,994	61.1	−12.3
Labour Co-op hold		Swing		
