= Clydebank and Milngavie (UK Parliament constituency) =

UK Parliament constituency (1983–2005)

- Former county constituency for the House of Commons
- Boundary of Clydebank and Milngavie in Scotland for the 2001 general election

1983–2005
- Seats: One
- Replaced by: West Dunbartonshire; East Dunbartonshire

Clydebank and Milngavie was a county constituency in Scotland. It returned one Member of Parliament (MP) to the House of Commons of the Parliament of the United Kingdom from 1983 until 2005, when it was redistributed to West Dunbartonshire and East Dunbartonshire as part of a major reorganisation of Scottish constituencies.

The similarly named constituency of Clydebank and Milngavie continues for the Scottish Parliament.

== Boundaries ==
1983–1997: Clydebank District, and the Bearsden and Milngavie District wards of Barloch, Clober, Craigdhu, and Keystone.

1997–2005: Clydebank District, and the Bearsden and Milngavie District electoral division of Milngavie/Kilmardinny.

== Members of Parliament ==
Election	Member	Party
1983	Hugh McCartney	Labour
1987	Tony Worthington	Labour
2005	constituency abolished	

== Elections ==
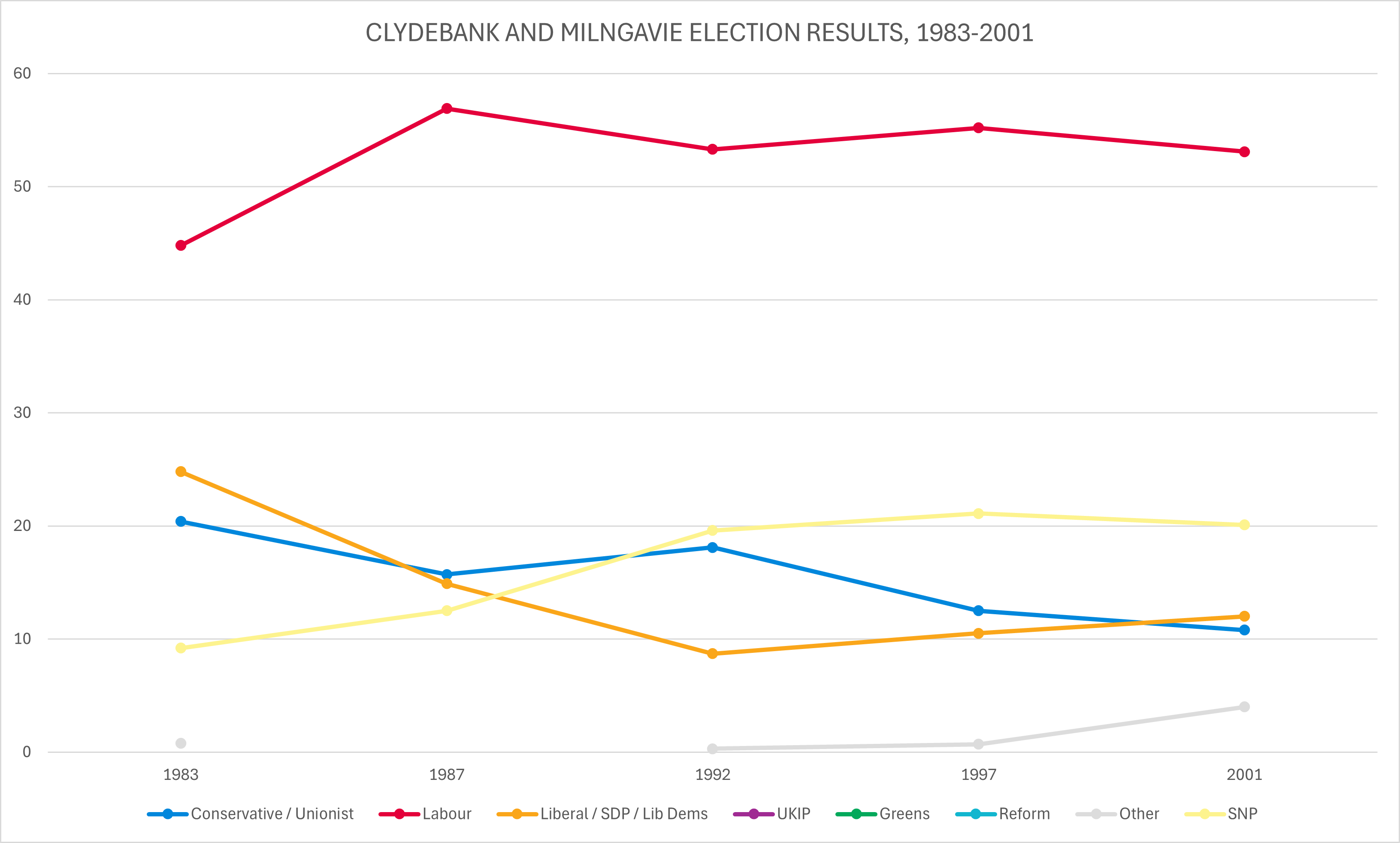
Election results 1983-2001

=== Elections of the 1980s ===
General election 1983: Clydebank and Milngavie
Party	Candidate	Votes	%	±%
Labour	Hugh McCartney	17,288	44.8	−6.6
SDP	James Gourlay	9,573	24.8	+17.0
Conservative	Robert Graham	7,852	20.4	−1.8
SNP	Alexander Aitken	3,566	9.2	−6.0
Communist	James Bollan	308	0.8	New
Majority		7,715	20.0	
Turnout		38,587	75.9	
Labour win (new seat)				

General election 1987: Clydebank and Milngavie
Party	Candidate	Votes	%	±%
Labour	Tony Worthington	22,528	56.9	+12.1
Conservative	Kenneth Hirstwood	6,224	15.7	−4.7
SDP	Rodney Ackland	5,891	14.9	−9.9
SNP	Stanley Fisher	4,935	12.5	+3.3
Majority		16,304	41.2	+21.2
Turnout		39,578	78.9	+3.0
Labour hold		Swing	+5.0	

=== Elections of the 1990s ===
General election 1992: Clydebank and Milngavie
Party	Candidate	Votes	%	±%
Labour	Tony Worthington	19,637	53.3	−3.6
SNP	Gordon J. Hughes	7,207	19.6	+7.1
Conservative	William A. Harvey	6,654	18.1	+2.4
Liberal Democrats	Alastair G. Tough	3,216	8.7	−6.2
Natural Law	J Barrie	112	0.3	New
Majority		12,430	33.7	−7.5
Turnout		36,826	77.8	−1.1
Labour hold		Swing		

General election 1997: Clydebank and Milngavie
Party	Candidate	Votes	%	±%
Labour	Tony Worthington	21,583	55.2	+5.0
SNP	Jim Yuill	8,263	21.1	+2.7
Conservative	Nancy E. Morgan	4,885	12.5	−9.0
Liberal Democrats	Keith W. Moody	4,086	10.5	+0.9
Referendum	Ian Sanderson	269	0.7	New
Majority		13,320	34.1	+0.4
Turnout		39,086	75.0	−2.8
Labour hold		Swing		

=== Elections of the 2000s ===
General election 2001: Clydebank and Milngavie
Party	Candidate	Votes	%	±%
Labour	Tony Worthington	17,249	53.1	−2.1
SNP	Jim Yuill	6,525	20.1	−1.0
Liberal Democrats	Rodney Ackland	3,909	12.0	+1.5
Conservative	Kate Jardine	3,514	10.8	−1.7
Scottish Socialist	Dawn Brennan	1,294	4.0	New
Majority		10,724	33.0	−1.1
Turnout		32,491	62.5	−12.5
Labour hold		Swing		
