= Islands council areas of Scotland =

Between 1975 and 1996 there were three island-only council areas of Scotland:

- Orkney
- Shetland
- Western Isles

The islands council areas were the only unitary councils created under the Local Government (Scotland) Act 1973, which came into force in 1975. Notably, they were the only unitary authorities created by the local government reforms of the 1970s in Great Britain; which otherwise applied a two-tier structure. They did not form districts within the regions of Scotland because their remoteness made it unviable.

Single-tier council areas were not created throughout the rest of Scotland until 1996, under the Local Government etc. (Scotland) Act 1994, which came into force in 1996. In most of Scotland, from 1975 to 1996, local government areas consisted of regions and districts.

The islands areas still exist, but have no special status. They are now simply classed as three of the 32 local government council areas of Scotland, having identical powers and responsibilities as the mainland councils.

== Pre-1975 ==
The Orkney and Shetland areas were also the areas of county councils which were abolished in 1975. The Western Isles area combined areas which were previously within the county council areas of Ross and Cromarty and Inverness-shire.

== See also ==
- Wheatley Commission
