= Joseph Devine =

Scottish bishop

Right Reverend Joseph Devine
- Bishop Emeritus of Motherwell
- Church: Roman Catholic
- Diocese: Motherwell
- Appointed: 13 May 1983
- Term ended: 31 May 2013
- Predecessor: Francis Thomson
- Successor: Joseph Toal
- Previous posts: Auxiliary Bishop of Glasgow and Titular Bishop of Voli (1977–83)

Orders
- Ordination: 29 June 1960 by Donald Campbell
- Consecration: 31 May 1977 by Thomas Winning

Personal details
- Born: 7 August 1937 Kirkintilloch, Scotland
- Died: 23 May 2019 (aged 81) Wishaw, Scotland
- Buried: Motherwell Cathedral

Styles of Joseph Devine
- Reference style: The Right Reverend
- Spoken style: My Lord
- Religious style: Bishop Emeritus
- Posthumous style: not applicable

Joseph Devine (7 August 1937 – 23 May 2019) was the Roman Catholic Bishop of Motherwell in Scotland.

== Biography ==
He was educated at St Ninian's School, Kirkintilloch, St. Mary's College, Blairs and St. Peter's College, Cardross. He was ordained priest on 29 June 1960 at the Pontifical Scots College in Rome. He received his Ph.D. in 1964 from the Pontifical Gregorian University, Rome.

He was private secretary to the Archbishop of Glasgow from 1964 to 1965. He was assistant priest at St. Robert Bellarmine, Pollok, Glasgow (1965–67) and at St. Joseph's, Helensburgh (1967–72). He was on staff at St. Peter's College, Cardross (1967–74).

He served on the staff of the Episcopal Vicar for the Lay Apostolate from 1974 to 1983. He was appointed Auxiliary Bishop on 5 May 1977, aged 39. He was ordained bishop by Thomas Joseph Winning, Archbishop of Glasgow, in St. Francis' Church, Gorbals, Glasgow, on 31 May 1977. He was translated to the Diocese of Motherwell on 13 May 1983, aged 45.

Bishop Devine handed his resignation to the Vatican on 7 August 2012, his 75th birthday, as required by canon law, this was accepted on 30 May 2013 at which point Bishop Joseph Toal, Bishop of Argyll and the Isles was appointed apostolic administrator. The Diocese of Motherwell was a Sede Vacante until his successor, Bishop Joseph Toal, was appointed by Pope Francis on 29 April 2014 with his installation taking place on 23 June 2014 where Bishop Devine handed over the diocesan Crozier to the new bishop. Joseph Devine died Thursday 23 May 2019 after a short stay in Wishaw General Hospital.

== Views and controversies ==
=== Public views on denominational education ===
In September 2002, Bishop Devine said, "Denominational education is an enabler of sectarianism", also "Roman Catholic schooling is divisive - sometimes it's a price worth paying". He justified the remarks by saying "The Catholic community believes that with denominational schooling comes the creation of a common set of values - a coherent system that has the academic curriculum and moral and spiritual life in tandem".

=== Public views on Parishes ===
In February 2008, he called for an audit of police officers to combat sectarian discrimination against Catholics. The discrimination includes denying promotion to Catholics above a certain rank. Anti-sectarianism charity Nil by Mouth supported the call.

=== Public views on homosexuality ===
In March 2008, as part of a public lecture on Sectarianism and Secularism, Devine drew controversy when he denounced the "gay lobby" for attending Holocaust memorials "to create for themselves the image of a group of people under persecution." He accused them of being part of a "giant conspiracy" to completely destroy Christianity. Bishop Devine explained, "Like Mel Gibson, who said, 'I'm going to pick a fight', so am I... The homosexual lobby has been extremely effective in aligning itself with minority groups. It is ever present at the service each year for the Holocaust memorial, as if to create for themselves the image of a group of people under persecution."

Devine harshly criticised the decision to honour Sir Ian McKellen for his work for equality and, by way of illustrating the advances made by gays, pointed out that Oscar Wilde had been incarcerated following conviction for violating the gross indecency statute. The Bishop also took the opportunity to advise the parents of gay children: "This must be a nightmare moment for any parent. I would try to handle it with a degree of compassion. But I would not tolerate that kind of behaviour. I would not condemn but I would not tolerate it."

Critics of Bishop Devine replied that between 5,000 and 15,000 gay men were held in concentration camps by the Nazis as members of an "anti-social group." Historians estimate that 60% of them died while incarcerated.

In 2007, Bishop Devine further stated that he would close the Roman Catholic adoption agencies rather than be legally coerced into helping same-sex couples to adopt children, and earlier in the year suggested that homosexual men and women were not fit to teach in classrooms.

=== Financial controversies ===
In November 2008, Bishop Devine attracted controversy when he demolished his home in Hamilton, South Lanarkshire, in order to build a new residence at an estimated cost of £650,000. This occasioned criticism from many among his flock in the diocese, and from beyond. His purchase of the now demolished house also caused controversy in the tabloid press, who claimed that he had considered the acquisition of a property with a swimming pool. This was denied by Bishop Devine.

=== Sexual abuse scandal ===
In April 2013, The Observer alleged that as Bishop of Motherwell, Devine had protected priests who had sexually abused children and tried to silence or discredit their victims.

In 2016, Fr. John B. Farrell, a retired priest of the Diocese of Motherwell, the last headteacher at St Ninian's Orphanage, Falkland, Fife, was sentenced to five years imprisonment. His colleague Paul Kelly, a retired teacher from Portsmouth, was given ten years; both were convicted of the physical and sexual abuse of boys between the years 1979 and 1983. More than 100 charges involving 35 boys were made. Farrell and Kelly were members of the Irish Christian Brothers when the crimes were committed at the orphanage, which closed in 1983. Although Farrell was not an ordained priest at the time when these specific offences were committed, an initial police investigation between 2000 and 2002 resulted in no charges. During this period, Farrell was in active ministry in the Diocese of Motherwell which at the time was led by Bishop Joseph Devine.

Catholic Church titles
Preceded by Francis Thomson	Bishop of Motherwell; 1983–2013	Succeeded by Joseph Toal
