= Motherwell (disambiguation) =

Motherwell is a town in North Lanarkshire, Scotland

Motherwell may also refer to:

== Constituencies ==
- Motherwell (UK Parliament constituency), a constituency in the Parliament of the United Kingdom
- Motherwell and Wishaw (UK Parliament constituency)
- Motherwell and Wishaw (Scottish Parliament constituency)
- Motherwell North (UK Parliament constituency)
- Motherwell South (UK Parliament constituency)

== Transportation ==
- Motherwell railway station, in Motherwell, Scotland
- Motherwell TMD, a locomotive Traction Maintenance Depot in Motherwell, Scotland
- Motherwell–Cumbernauld line, a railway line

== People ==
- Bishop of Motherwell, the Ordinary of the Roman Catholic Diocese of Motherwell
- Robert Motherwell (1915-1991), an American abstract expressionist painter
- William Motherwell (1797-1835), a Scottish poet
- William Richard Motherwell (1860-1943), a Canadian politician

== Other ==
- Roman Catholic Diocese of Motherwell, an ecclesiastical territory of the Roman Catholic Church in Scotland
- Motherwell College, a further education college based in the Ravenscraig area of Motherwell, Scotland
- Motherwell F.C., a football club based in Motherwell, Scotland
- Motherwell Shopping Centre, an outdoor shopping centre in Motherwell, Scotland
- Motherwell Homestead, a National Historic Site in Canada
- Motherwell, Eastern Cape, South Africa, a township in South Africa
