= Scottish Westminster constituencies 1974 to 1983 =

Overview
1708 to 1832
1832 to 1868
1868 to 1885
1885 to 1918
1918 to 1950
1950 to 1955
1955 to 1974
1974 to 1983
1983 to 1997
1997 to 2005
2005 to 2024
since 2024

The results of the Second Periodical Review, concluded in 1969, and a subsequent interim review, concluded in 1972, of the Boundary Commission for Scotland, became effective for the February 1974 general election of the House of Commons of the Parliament of the United Kingdom (Westminster). The reviews defined 29 burgh constituencies (BCs) and 42 county constituencies (CCs), with each electing one Member of Parliament (MP) by the first past the post system of election. Therefore, Scotland had 71 parliamentary seats.

Each constituency was entirely within a county or a grouping of two or three counties, or was if the cities of Aberdeen, Dundee, Edinburgh and Glasgow are regarded as belonging, respectively to the county of Aberdeen, the county of Angus, the county of Midlothian and the county of Lanark.

February 1974 boundaries were used also in the general elections of October 1974 and 1979.

In 1975 Scottish counties were abolished under the Local Government (Scotland) Act 1973. The Third Periodical Review took account of new local government boundaries, which defined two-tier regions and districts and unitary islands council areas, and the results of the review were implemented for the 1983 general election.

== Boundaries ==
County or counties	Constituency or constituencies	Contents of constituency	Regional or islands area coverage
Aberdeen including City of Aberdeen	Aberdeen North BC	Mastrick, Northfield, St Clement's, St Machar, St Nicholas, and Woodside wards of city	Part of Grampian region (part of City of Aberdeen district)
Aberdeen including City of Aberdeen	Aberdeen South BC	Ferryhill, Holburn, Rosemount, Rubislaw, Ruthrieston, and Torry wards of city	Part of Grampian region (part of City of Aberdeen district)
Aberdeen including City of Aberdeen	East Aberdeenshire CC	Deer, Ellon, and Turriff districts of county Burghs of Ellon, Fraserburgh, Peterhead, Rosehearty, and Turriff; Overall boundary as 1955 to 1974	Part of Grampian region (four-fifths of Banff and Buchan and one-fifth of Gordon districts)
Aberdeen including City of Aberdeen	West Aberdeenshire CC	Aberdeen, Alford, Deeside, Garioch, and Huntly districts of county Burghs of Ballater, Huntly, Inverurie, Kintore, and Oldmeldrum	Part of Grampian region (part of Gordon, part of City of Aberdeen and part of Kincardine and Deeside districts)
Angus, including City of Dundee, and Kincardine	Dundee East BC	Broughty Ferry, Caird, Craigie, Douglas, Harbour, and Hilltown wards of city Overall boundary as 1950 to 1974	Part of Tayside region (part of City of Dundee district)
Angus, including City of Dundee, and Kincardine	Dundee West BC	Balgay, Camperdown, Downfield, Law, Lochee, and Riverside wards of city	Part of Tayside region (part of City of Dundee district)
Angus, including City of Dundee, and Kincardine	North Angus and Mearns CC	County of Kincardine; Brechin and Montrose districts of county of Angus; Burghs of Brechin and Montrose in county of Angus	Part of Tayside region (part of Angus district) and part of Grampian region (part of Kincardine and Deeside and part of City of Aberdeen districts)
Angus, including City of Dundee, and Kincardine	South Angus CC	Carnoustie, Forfar, Kirriemuir, and Monifieth districts of county of Angus; Burghs of Arbroath, Carnoustie, Forfar, Kirriemuir, and Monifieth in county of Angus	Part of Tayside region (part of Angus, part of City of Dundee and small part of Perth and Kinross districts)
Argyll	Argyll CC	County of Argyll; Overall boundary as 1918 to 1974	Part of Highland region (one-fifth of Lochaber district) and part of Strathclyde region (part of Argyll and Bute district)
Ayr and Bute	Ayr CC	Part of Ayr district Burghs if Ayr and Prestwick in county of Ayr; Overall boundary as 1950 to 1974	Part of Strathclyde region (part of Kyle and Carrick district)
Ayr and Bute	Bute and North Ayrshire CC	County of Bute; West Kilbride district of county of Ayr; Burghs of Ardrossan, Largs, Saltcoats and Stevenston in county of Ayr; Overall boundary as 1955 to 1974	Part of Strathclyde region (part of Argyll and Bute and part of Cunninghame districts)
Ayr and Bute	Central Ayrshire CC	Irvine and Kilbirnie districts and part of Ayr district of county of Ayr; Burghs of Irvine, Kilwinning, and Troon in county of Ayr	Part of Strathclyde region (part of Cunninghame and part of Kyle and Carrick districts)
Ayr and Bute	Kilmarnock CC	Kilmarnock district of county of Ayr; Burghs of Darvel, Galston, Kilmarnock, Newmilns and Greenholm, and Stewarton in county of Ayr	Part of Strathclyde region (Kilmarnock and Loudoun district)
Ayr and Bute	South Ayrshire CC	Cumnock, Dalmellington, Girvan, and Maybole districts of county of Ayr; Burghs of Cumnock and Holmhead, Girvan, and Maybole in county of Ayr; Minor alteration to overall boundary of 1950 to 1974	Part of Strathclyde region (Cumnock and Doon Valley and part of Kyle and Carrick districts)
Banff	Banffshire CC	County of Banff; Overall boundary as 1918 to 1974	Part of Grampian region (part of Moray and part of Banff and Buchan districts)
Berwick and East Lothian	Berwick and East Lothian CC	Counties of Berwick and East Lothian; Overall boundary as Berwick and Haddington CC 1918 to 1950 and Berwick and East Lothian 1950 to 1974	Part of Borders region (part of Ettrick and Lauderdale and very small part of Roxburgh districts) and part of Lothian region (part of East Lothian district)
Caithness and Sutherland	Caithness and Sutherland CC	Counties of Caithness and Sutherland; Overall boundary as 1918 to 1974	Part of Highland region (Caithness district and almost all of Sutherland district)
Dumfries	Dumfriesshire CC	County of Dumfries; Overall boundary as 1950 to 1974	Part of Dumfries and Galloway region (Annandale and Eskdale district and almost all of Nithsdale district)
Dunbarton	Central Dunbartonshire CC	Old Kilpatrick district Burghs of Clydebank and Milngavie	Part of Strathclyde region: part of Bearsden and Milngavie, part of Clydebank and part of Dumbarton districts)
Dunbarton	East Dunbartonshire CC	Kirkintilloch and Cumbernauld district Burghs of Bearsden, Cumbernauld, and Kirkintilloch	Part of Strathclyde region (part of Bearsden and Milngavie, part of Cumbernauld and Kilsyth and part of Strathkelvin districts)
Dunbarton	West Dunbartonshire CC	Helensburgh and Vale of Leven districts Burghs of Cove and Kilcreggan, Dumbarton, and Helensburgh	Part of Strathclyde region (part of Dumbarton district)
Fife	Central Fife CC	Glenrothes and Lochgelly districts and part of Kirkcaldy district Burghs of Cowdenbeath, Leslie, Lochgelly, and Markinch	Part of Fife region (part of Dunfermline and part of Kirkcaldy districts)
Fife	Dunfermline CC	Dunfermline district Burghs of Culross, Dunfermline, and Inverkeithing	Part of Fife region (part of Dunfermline district)
Fife	East Fife CC	Cupar, and St Andrews districts and part of Wemyss district Burghs of Auchtermuchty, Crail, Elie and Earlsferry, Falkland, Kilrenny and Anstruther Easter and Anstruther Wester, Ladybank, Leven, Newburgh, Newport-on-Tay, Pittenweem, St Andrews, St Monance, and Tayport	Part of Fife region (North East Fife district and part of Kirkcaldy district)
Fife	Kirkcaldy CC	Part of Kirkcaldy and part of Wemyss districts Burghs of Buckhaven and Methil, Burntisland, Kinghorn, and Kirkcaldy	Part of Fife region (part of Kirkcaldy and very small part of Dunfermline districts)
Inverness and Ross and Cromarty	Inverness CC	County of Inverness except Outer Hebridean districts (Barra, Harris, North Uist, and South Uist); Overall boundary as 1918 to 1974	Part of Highland region (Inverness district and four-fifths of Lochaber and three-quarters of Badenoch and Strathspey districts)
Inverness and Ross and Cromarty	Ross and Cromarty CC	County of Ross and Cromarty except Outer Hebridean district (Lewis) and burgh (Stornoway); Overall boundary as 1918 to 1974	Part of Highland region (Ross and Cromarty district and one-fifth of Skye and Lochalsh and very small part of Sutherland districts)
Inverness and Ross and Cromarty	Western Isles CC	Outer Hebridean districts (Barra, Harris, North Uist, and South Uist) of the county of Inverness; Outer Hebridean district (Harris) of the county of Ross and Cromarty; Outer Hebridean burgh of Stornoway in the county of Ross and Cromarty; Overall boundary as 1918 to 1974	Western Isles islands area
Kirkcudbright and Wigtown	Galloway CC	Counties of Kirkcudbright and Wigtown; Overall boundary as 1950 to 1974	Part of Dumfries and Galloway region (Stewartry and Wigtown districts and small part of Nithsdale district)
Lanark, including City of Glasgow	Coatbridge and Airdrie BC	Burghs of Coatbridge and Airdrie	Part of Strathclyde region (part of Monklands district)
Lanark, including City of Glasgow	Glasgow Cathcart BC	Cathcart ward and part of Langside ward of city	Part of Strathclyde region (part of City of Glasgow district)
Lanark, including City of Glasgow	Glasgow Central BC	Calton, Dalmarnock, Exchange, and Townhead wards of city	Part of Strathclyde region (part of City of Glasgow district)
Lanark, including City of Glasgow	Glasgow Craigton BC	Craigton ward and part of Pollokshields ward of city	Part of Strathclyde region (part of City of Glasgow district)
Lanark, including City of Glasgow	Glasgow Garscadden BC	Knightswood and Yoker wards of city	Part of Strathclyde region (part of City of Glasgow district)
Lanark, including City of Glasgow	Glasgow Govan BC	Fairfield, Govan, Kingston, and Kinning Park wards of city	Part of Strathclyde region (part of City of Glasgow district)
Lanark, including City of Glasgow	Glasgow Hillhead BC	Kelvinside, Partick West, and Whiteinch wards of city	Part of Strathclyde region (part of City of Glasgow district)
Lanark, including City of Glasgow	Glasgow Kelvingrove BC	Anderston, North Kelvin, Park, Partick East, and Woodside wards of city	Part of Strathclyde region (part of City of Glasgow district)
Lanark, including City of Glasgow	Glasgow Maryhill BC	Cowcaddens, Maryhill, and Ruchill wards of city	Part of Strathclyde region (part of City of Glasgow district)
Lanark, including City of Glasgow	Glasgow Pollok BC	Camphill and Pollokshaws wards and part of Pollokshields ward of city Overall boundary as 1955 to 1974	Part of Strathclyde region (part of City of Glasgow district)
Lanark, including City of Glasgow	Glasgow Provan BC	Provan ward and part of Shettleston and Tollcross ward of city	Part of Strathclyde region (part of City of Glasgow district)
Lanark, including City of Glasgow	Glasgow Queen's Park BC	Gorbals, Govanhill, and Hutchesontown wards and part of Langside ward of city	Part of Strathclyde region (part of City of Glasgow district)
Lanark, including City of Glasgow	Glasgow Shettleston BC	Mile-End and Parkhead wards and part of Shettleston and Tollcross ward of city	Part of Strathclyde region (part of City of Glasgow district)
Lanark, including City of Glasgow	Glasgow Springburn BC	Cowlairs, Dennistoun, and Springburn wards of city	Part of Strathclyde region (part of City of Glasgow district)
Lanark, including City of Glasgow	Motherwell and Wishaw BC	Burgh of Motherwell and Wishaw	Part of Strathclyde region (part of Motherwell district)
Lanark, including City of Glasgow	Bothwell CC	Part of Sixth and part of Ninth districts	Part of Strathclyde region (part of City of Glasgow, part of Hamilton, part of Monklands and part of Motherwell districts)
Lanark, including City of Glasgow	East Kilbride CC	Part of Fourth and part of Eighth districts Burgh of East Kilbride	Part of Strathclyde region (part of East Kilbride and part of Hamilton districts)
Lanark, including City of Glasgow	Hamilton CC	Part of Fourth district Burgh of Hamilton	Part of Strathclyde region (part of Hamilton district)
Lanark, including City of Glasgow	Lanark CC	First, Second, and Third districts and part of Fourth and part of Seventh districts Burghs of Biggar and Lanark	Part of Strathclyde region (part of Clydesdale, part of East Kilbride and part of Motherwell districts)
Lanark, including City of Glasgow	North Lanarkshire CC	Part of Sixth, part of Seventh and part of Ninth districts Burgh of Bishopbriggs	Part of Strathclyde region (part of Motherwell, part of Monklands and part of Strathkelvin districts)
Lanark, including City of Glasgow	Rutherglen CC	Part of Eighth and part of Ninth districts Burgh of Rutherglen	Part of Strathclyde region (part of City of Glasgow and part of East Kilbride districts)
Midlothian, including City of Edinburgh	Edinburgh Central BC	George Square, Gorgie-Dalry, Holyrood, and St Giles wards and part of Merchiston ward of city	Part of Lothian region (part of City of Edinburgh district)
Midlothian, including City of Edinburgh	Edinburgh East BC	Craigentinny, Craigmillar, and Portobello wards of city Burgh of Musselburgh	Part of Lothian region (part of City of Edinburgh and part of East Lothian districts)
Midlothian, including City of Edinburgh	Edinburgh Leith BC	Central Leith, South Leith, and West Leith wards and part of Pilton ward of city	Part of Lothian region (part of City of Edinburgh district)
Midlothian, including City of Edinburgh	Edinburgh North BC	Broughton, Carlton, St Andrew's, and St Bernard's wards of city	Part of Lothian region (part of City of Edinburgh district)
Midlothian, including City of Edinburgh	Edinburgh Pentlands BC	Colinton and Sighthill wards and part of Merchiston ward of city	Part of Lothian region (part of City of Edinburgh district)
Midlothian, including City of Edinburgh	Edinburgh South BC	Liberton, Morningside, and Newington wards of city Minor alteration to overall boundary of 1964 to 1974	Part of Lothian region (part of City of Edinburgh district)
Midlothian, including City of Edinburgh	Edinburgh West BC	Corstorphine and Murrayfield-Cramond wards and part of Pilton ward of city	Part of Lothian region (part of City of Edinburgh district)
Midlothian, including City of Edinburgh	Midlothian CC	County of Midlothian except city of Edinburgh and burgh of Musselburgh	Part of Lothian region (Midlothian district and part of City of Edinburgh, part of East Lothian and part of West Lothian districts) and part of Borders region (small part of Ettrick and Lauderdale district)
Moray and Nairn	Moray and Nairn CC	Counties of Moray and Nairn; Overall boundary as 1918 to 1974	Part of Grampian region (Moray district) and part of Highland region (Nairn district and one-quarter of Badenoch and Strathspey district)
Orkney and Shetland	Orkney and Zetland CC	Counties of Orkney and Shetland; Overall boundary as 1950 to 1974	Orkney and Shetland islands areas
Peebles, Roxburgh and Selkirk	Roxburgh, Selkirk and Peebles CC	Counties of Peebles, Roxburgh, and Selkirk; Overall boundary as 1918 to 1974	Part of Borders region (almost all of Roxburgh and over four-fifths of Ettrick and Lauderdale districts)
Perth and Kinross	Kinross and West Perthshire CC	County of Kinross; Central, Highland, and Western districts of county of Perth; Burghs of Aberfeldy, Auchterarder, Callander, Crieff, Doune, Dunblane, and Pitlochry in county of Perth; Minor alteration to overall boundary of Kinross and Western Perthshire 1918 to 1950 and Perth and West Perthshire 1950 to 1974	Missing information
Perth and Kinross	Perth and East Perthshire CC	Eastern and Perth districts of county of Perth; Burghs of Abernethy, Alyth, Blairgowrie and Rattray, Coupar Angus, and Perth in county of Perth; Minor alteration to overall boundary of Perth 1918 to 1950 and Perth and East Perthshire 1950 to 1974	Missing information
Renfrew	Greenock and Port Glasgow BC	Burghs of Greenock and Port Glasgow	Part of Strathclyde region (part of Inverclyde district)
Renfrew	Paisley BC	Burgh of Paisley	Part of Strathclyde region (part of Renfrew district)
Renfrew	East Renfrewshire CC	First and Second districts Burgh of Barrhead	Part of Strathclyde region (Eastwood district and part of Renfrew district)
Renfrew	West Renfrewshire CC	Third, Fourth, and Fifth districts Burghs of Gourock, Johnstone, and Renfrew	Part of Strathclyde region (part of Inverclyde and part of Renfrew districts)
Stirling and Clackmannan	Stirling, Falkirk and Grangemouth BC	Burghs of Falkirk, Grangemouth, and Stirling in county of Stirling	Part of Central region (part of Falkirk and part of Stirling districts)
Stirling and Clackmannan	Clackmannan and East Stirlingshire CC	County of Clackmannan; Eastern Number One, Eastern Number Two, and Eastern Number Three districts of county of Stirling; Minor alteration to overall boundary of 1950 to 1974	Part of Central region (almost all of Clackmannan and part of Falkirk districts)
Stirling and Clackmannan	West Stirlingshire CC	Central Number One, Central Number Two, Western Number One, Western Number Two, and Western Number Three districts of county of Stirling; Burghs of Bridge of Allan, Denny and Dunipace, and Kilsyth in county of Stirling	Part of Central region (part of Stirling and part of Falkirk districts) and part of Strathclyde region (part of Bearsden and Milngavie, part of Cumbernauld and Kilsyth and part of Strathkelvin districts)
West Lothian	West Lothian CC	County of West Lothian; Overall boundary as Linlithgow 1918 to 1950 and West Lothian 1950 to 1974	Part of Lothian region (about two-thirds of West Lothian and part of City of Edinburgh districts) and part of Central region (part of Stirling district)
