= List of listed buildings in North Lanarkshire =

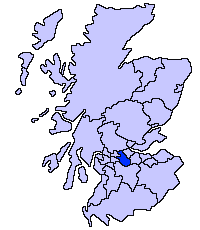
North Lanarkshire shown within Scotland

This is a list of listed buildings in North Lanarkshire. The list is split out by parish.

- List of listed buildings in Airdrie, North Lanarkshire
- List of listed buildings in Bothwell, North Lanarkshire
- List of listed buildings in Cadder, North Lanarkshire
- List of listed buildings in Cambusnethan, North Lanarkshire
- List of listed buildings in Coatbridge, North Lanarkshire
- List of listed buildings in Cumbernauld, North Lanarkshire
- List of listed buildings in Kilsyth, North Lanarkshire
- List of listed buildings in Motherwell And Wishaw, North Lanarkshire
- List of listed buildings in New Monkland, North Lanarkshire
- List of listed buildings in Old Monkland, North Lanarkshire
- List of listed buildings in Shotts, North Lanarkshire

== See also ==
- List of Category A listed buildings in North Lanarkshire
- Scheduled monuments in North Lanarkshire
