= Francis Thomson (bishop) =

Scottish Roman Catholic clergyman

The Right Reverend Francis Thomson
- Bishop Emeritus of Motherwell
- Church: Roman Catholic Church
- Diocese: Motherwell
- Appointed: 8 December 1964
- Term ended: 14 December 1982
- Predecessor: James Donald Scanlan
- Successor: Joseph Devine

Orders
- Ordination: 15 June 1946 by Andrew McDonald
- Consecration: 24 February 1965 by James Donald Scanlan

Personal details
- Born: Francis Alexander Spalding Warden Thomson; 15 May 1917 Edinburgh, Scotland
- Died: 6 December 1987 (aged 70) Partick, Glasgow, Scotland
- Buried: Motherwell Cathedral
- Motto: Sperans in Domino

Francis Alexander Spalding Warden Thomson (15 May 1917 – 6 December 1987) was a Scottish Roman Catholic clergyman who served as the Bishop of Motherwell from 1964 to 1982.

== Biography ==
Born in Edinburgh, Scotland on 15 May 1917 and was educated at George Watson's College. He received a Master of Arts from University of Edinburgh (1938) and a Bachelor of Arts from the University of Cambridge (1940). He received a licentiate of Sacred Theology from the Angelicum in Rome and was ordained to the priesthood on 15 June 1946 for the Archdiocese of St Andrews and Edinburgh. He served as a curate at St Patrick's, Kilsyth (1946–48); St James', St Andrews (1949–52) and St Cuthbert's, Edinburgh (1952–53). He was a staff member at St Andrew's College, Drygrange (1953–60) and was rector of St Mary's College, Blairs (1960–64). In 1961, he was named honorary canon of St Andrews and Edinburgh.

He was appointed the Bishop of the Diocese of Motherwell by the Holy See on 8 December 1964, and consecrated to the Episcopate on 24 February 1965. The principal consecrator was Archbishop James Donald Scanlan of Glasgow, and the principal co-consecrators were Bishop James Black of Paisley and Bishop Stephen McGill of Argyll and the Isles (later Bishop of Paisley). He attended the final session of the Second Vatican Council in 1965.

He resigned on 14 December 1982 and assumed the title Bishop Emeritus of Motherwell. He retired to Biggar as parish priest and died on 6 December 1987, aged 70.

Catholic Church titles
Preceded by James Donald Scanlan	Bishop of Motherwell; 1964–1982	Succeeded by Joseph Devine
