= Edward Douglas (bishop) =

Scottish Catholic bishop

The Right Reverend Edward Douglas
- Bishop Emeritus of Motherwell
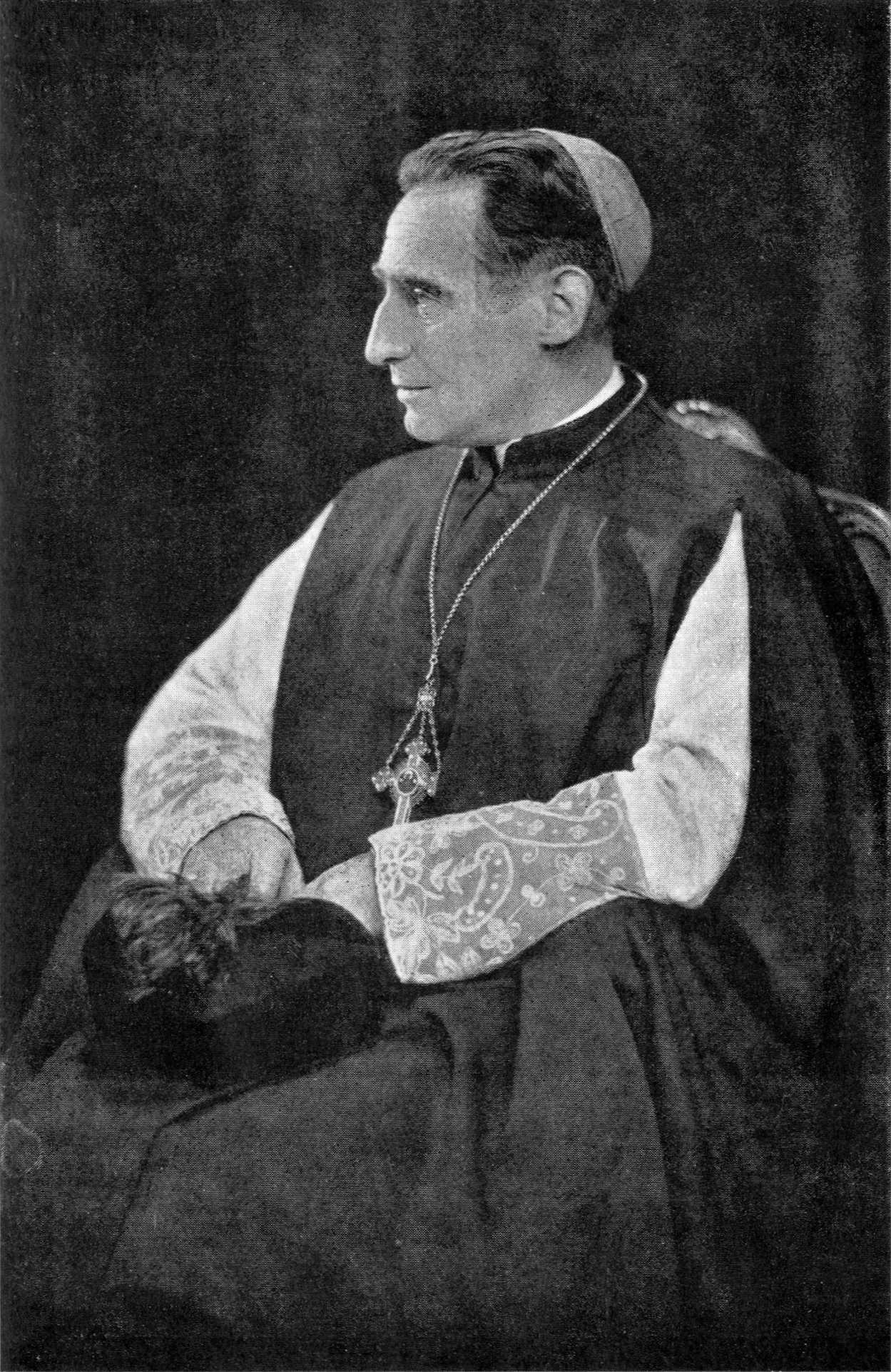
- Church: Roman Catholic
- Diocese: Motherwell
- Appointed: 7 February 1948
- Term ended: 9 February 1954
- Successor: James Donald Scanlan
- Other post(s): Titular Bishop of Botrys (1954–1967)

Orders
- Ordination: 1 May 1924 by Donald Mackintosh
- Consecration: 21 April 1948 by Donald Alphonsus Campbell

Personal details
- Born: Edward Wilson Douglas; 27 August 1901; Crosshill, Glasgow, Scotland
- Died: 12 June 1967 (aged 65); Glasgow, Scotland
- Buried: St Patrick's Cemetery, New Stevenston

Edward Wilson Douglas (26 August 1901 – 12 June 1967) was a Scottish Roman Catholic clergyman who served as the first Bishop of Motherwell from 1948 to 1954.

== Life ==
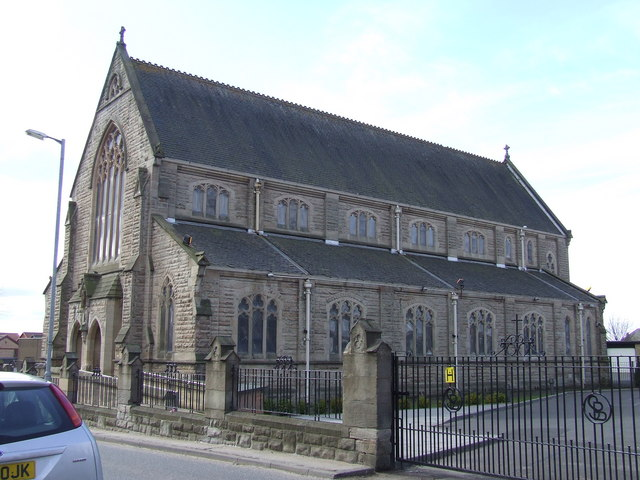
St Bridget's Church, Baillieston

Born in Glasgow, Scotland on 26 August 1901 in the parish of Holy Cross, Edward W. Douglas was educated at St Aloysius' College, Glasgow. In 1916, he began his studies for the priesthood at St. Mary's College, Blairs. In 1919, he entered the diocesan seminary, St. Peter's in Bearsden. He was ordained to the priesthood at St Andrew's Cathedral, Glasgow by Archbishop Donald Mackintosh on 1 May 1924.

Douglas served as a parish priest at St. Margaret's, Airdrie, St. Bridget's, Baillieston, and St. Alphonsus', Glasgow. and then spent eighteen years on the staff of St. Mary's College, where he was choirmaster and organist, and is remembered as a devoted and gifted teacher. Douglas then served as parish priest at St. Joseph's in Glenboig and inspector of schools for the Archdiocese. A few years later he went to St. Anthony's, in Govan, Glasgow. His brother Robert was also a parish priest.

He was appointed the Bishop of the Diocese of Motherwell by the Holy See on 7 February 1948. The Church of Our Lady of Good Aid in Motherwell was chosen as the cathedral of the new diocese. Douglas was consecrated to the Episcopate on 21 April 1948. The principal consecrator was Archbishop Donald Alphonsus Campbell of Glasgow, and the principal co-consecrators were Bishop Kenneth Grant of Argyll and the Isles and Bishop John Alexander Matheson of Aberdeen.

During his six-year tenure, fourteen new parishes were established and two new churches built in older parishes, and the Cathedral Chapter erected in 1953. The Capuchins were established in Uddingston, the Missionaries of Africa in Rutherglen, and the Xaverians in Biggar. The Society of the Helpers of the Holy Souls founded a retreat house for women and girls at Newmains. The Poor Clares and the Notre Dame Sisters also established houses in the diocese.

Douglas resigned as Bishop of Motherwell due to continuing ill health and was appointed Titular Bishop of Botrys on 9 February 1954. He retired to Fairlie, Ayrshire and later underwent a serious throat operation. He died on 12 June 1967, aged 65, at Bon Secours Hospital, in Glasgow and was buried in St. Patrick's cemetery, New Stevenson, Lanarkshire.

Catholic Church titles
New title	Bishop of Motherwell; 1948–1954	Succeeded by James Donald Scanlan
