= List of listed buildings in Cambusnethan, North Lanarkshire =

This is a list of listed buildings in the parish of Cambusnethan in North Lanarkshire, Scotland.

== List ==
Name	Location	Date Listed	Grid Ref. (Note: Sometimes known as OSGB36, the grid reference (where provided) is based on the British national grid reference system used by the Ordnance Survey. • "Guide to National Grid". Ordnance Survey. • "Get-a-map". Ordnance Survey.)	Geo-coordinates	Notes	LB Number (Note: Historic Environment Scotland assign a unique alphanumeric identifier to each designated site in Scotland, for listed buildings this always begins with "LB", for example "LB12345".)	Image
Wishaw, Netherton, Kirkhill Road, St Michael's Churchyard, Enclosure And Mausolea				55°45′50″N 3°57′56″W	Category B	64	Upload another image
Newmains, 144 And 144A Manse Road Including Gatepiers				55°46′54″N 3°53′04″W	Category C(S)	47981	Upload Photo
Wishaw, Garrion Bridge, Garrionhurst				55°44′14″N 3°55′17″W	Category C(S)	47987	Upload Photo
Wishaw, Garrion Bridge, 1 And 2 Millfield Cottage				55°44′19″N 3°55′20″W	Category C(S)	47988	Upload Photo
Allanton, Old Mill Road, Allanton Mill				55°48′21″N 3°49′48″W	Category C(S)	47976	Upload Photo
Bonkle, Church Road, Bonkle Parish Church (Church Of Scotland) Including Church Hall And Gatepiers				55°47′33″N 3°51′23″W	Category B	47979	Upload another image
Morningside Chapel, 322 And 324 Morningside Road, Former School				55°46′13″N 3°51′35″W	Category C(S)	50123	Upload Photo
Bonkle, Murdostoun Road, Murdostoun Bridge				55°47′35″N 3°51′33″W	Category B	669	Upload Photo
Auchterhead Muir, Covenanters Monument, Darmead-Lin				55°46′43″N 3°45′13″W	Category B	671	Upload Photo
Bonkle, 1 Church Road				55°47′31″N 3°51′28″W	Category C(S)	47980	Upload Photo
Overtown, Main Street, Overtown Parish Church (Church Of Scotland)				55°45′11″N 3°54′42″W	Category C(S)	47984	Upload another image See more images
Wishaw, Netherton, Kirkhill Road, Kirkhill House				55°45′59″N 3°57′35″W	Category C(S)	47990	Upload Photo
Newmains, Church Avenue, Coltness Memorial Church (Church Of Scotland)				55°46′51″N 3°53′03″W	Category B	673	Upload another image
Overtown, 148 Main Street, Overtown Parish Church Manse Including Boundary Wall				55°45′11″N 3°54′43″W	Category C(S)	47985	Upload Photo
Stane, 19 Main Street Including Boundary Wall				55°48′55″N 3°47′16″W	Category C(S)	47986	Upload Photo
Wishaw, Garrion Bridge, Millfield House Including Boundary Wall				55°44′20″N 3°55′19″W	Category C(S)	47989	Upload Photo
Wishaw, Netherton, Kirkhill Road, St Michael's Graveyard, Belhaven And Stenton Mausoleum				55°45′50″N 3°57′56″W	Category B	672	Upload another image
Bonkle, 3, 5 And 7 Allanton Road				55°47′33″N 3°51′29″W	Category C(S)	666	Upload Photo
Wishaw, Garrion Bridge, Garrion Tower				55°44′16″N 3°55′05″W	Category B	670	Upload Photo
Bonkle, Allanton Road, Woodypoint Estate, Bridge				55°47′40″N 3°51′05″W	Category C(S)	47977	Upload Photo
Bonkle, 251 Bonkle Road, Auchter House Including Gatepiers And Railings				55°47′25″N 3°51′44″W	Category C(S)	47978	Upload Photo
Wishaw, Castlehill Road, Cambusnethan House				55°45′20″N 3°56′40″W	Category A	47593	Upload Photo
Allanton, Allanton Road, Brucefield Farm, Allanton Well				55°47′52″N 3°50′56″W	Category C(S)	6450	Upload Photo
Wishaw, Castlehill Road, Cambusnethan House, The Coach House				55°45′24″N 3°56′50″W	Category B	689	Upload Photo
Bonkle, 9 Allanton Road				55°47′34″N 3°51′28″W	Category C(S)	667	Upload Photo
Newmains, Manse Road, Newmains Police Station Including Boundary Wall And Railings				55°46′59″N 3°52′40″W	Category B	47982	Upload Photo
Bonkle, 2 Allanton Road				55°47′32″N 3°51′27″W	Category C(S)	691	Upload Photo

== Key ==
The scheme for classifying buildings in Scotland is:

- Category A: "buildings of national or international importance, either architectural or historic; or fine, little-altered examples of some particular period, style or building type."
- Category B: "buildings of regional or more than local importance; or major examples of some particular period, style or building type, which may have been altered."
- Category C: "buildings of local importance; lesser examples of any period, style, or building type, as originally constructed or moderately altered; and simple traditional buildings which group well with other listed buildings."

In March 2016 there were 47,288 listed buildings in Scotland. Of these, 8% were Category A, and 50% were Category B, with the remaining 42% being Category C.

== See also ==
- List of listed buildings in North Lanarkshire
