= List of listed buildings in Cadder, North Lanarkshire =

This is a list of listed buildings in the parish of Cadder in North Lanarkshire, Scotland.

== List ==
Name	Location	Date Listed	Grid Ref. (Note: Sometimes known as OSGB36, the grid reference (where provided) is based on the British national grid reference system used by the Ordnance Survey. • "Guide to National Grid". Ordnance Survey. • "Get-a-map". Ordnance Survey.)	Geo-coordinates	Notes	LB Number (Note: Historic Environment Scotland assign a unique alphanumeric identifier to each designated site in Scotland, for listed buildings this always begins with "LB", for example "LB12345".)	Image
Gartcosh, Lochend Road, War Memorial Cottage, Gatepiers, Gates And Railings				55°53′19″N 4°04′55″W	Category C(S)	43027	Upload Photo
Ruined Gateway In Garden, Bedley House				55°54′20″N 4°05′36″W	Category B	4398	Upload Photo
Muirhead, Glaudhall Farmhouse				55°54′00″N 4°05′45″W	Category C(S)	48615	Upload Photo
Chryston, Main Street, Chryston Parish Church (Church Of Scotland) Including Graveyard, Boundary Walls And Gatepiers				55°54′24″N 4°05′57″W	Category C(S)	49465	Upload another image
Bedley House				55°54′21″N 4°05′39″W	Category A	4396	Upload another image See more images
Davidston				55°54′50″N 4°06′57″W	Category B	22283	Upload Photo
Stables, Bedley House				55°54′20″N 4°05′27″W	Category B	4397	Upload Photo

== Key ==
The scheme for classifying buildings in Scotland is:

- Category A: "buildings of national or international importance, either architectural or historic; or fine, little-altered examples of some particular period, style or building type."
- Category B: "buildings of regional or more than local importance; or major examples of some particular period, style or building type, which may have been altered."
- Category C: "buildings of local importance; lesser examples of any period, style, or building type, as originally constructed or moderately altered; and simple traditional buildings which group well with other listed buildings."

In March 2016 there were 47,288 listed buildings in Scotland. Of these, 8% were Category A, and 50% were Category B, with the remaining 42% being Category C.

== See also ==
- List of listed buildings in North Lanarkshire
