= List of listed buildings in Cumbernauld, North Lanarkshire =

This is a list of listed buildings in the parish of Cumbernauld in North Lanarkshire, Scotland.

== List ==
Name	Location	Date Listed	Grid Ref. (Note: Sometimes known as OSGB36, the grid reference (where provided) is based on the British national grid reference system used by the Ordnance Survey. • "Guide to National Grid". Ordnance Survey. • "Get-a-map". Ordnance Survey.)	Geo-coordinates	Notes	LB Number (Note: Historic Environment Scotland assign a unique alphanumeric identifier to each designated site in Scotland, for listed buildings this always begins with "LB", for example "LB12345".)	Image
Cumbernauld Parish Kirk				55°57′40″N 3°58′52″W	Category B	24068	Upload another image
(formerly) "The Masonic Arms", 62 Main Street				55°57′44″N 3°58′34″W	Category B	24081	Upload another image
Dullatur Village Prospect Road Dunluce				55°58′03″N 4°00′46″W	Category A	1062	Upload Photo
Dullatur Village, Victoria Road, Norwood And Hillcroft				55°58′07″N 4°00′29″W	Category B	1070	Upload Photo
Dullatur Village 1-11 (Inclusive Nos) Victoria Terrace				55°58′10″N 4°00′41″W	Category B	1071	Upload another image
Afton Road, Kildrum Primary School, Including Kildrum Nursery Centre (delisted by H.E.S. in December 2011 and demolished)				55°57′15″N 3°58′17″W	Category B	47351	Upload Photo
29 Main Street, Cumbernauld				55°57′44″N 3°58′30″W	Category C(S)	24072	Upload another image
34 Main Street, Cumbernauld				55°57′45″N 3°58′30″W	Category C(S)	24076	Upload another image
36 Main Street				55°57′44″N 3°58′31″W	Category C(S)	24077	Upload another image
70 Main Street				55°57′44″N 3°58′35″W	Category C(S)	24083	Upload another image
Fannyside Toll				55°56′25″N 3°54′59″W	Category C(S)	1072	Upload another image
Cumbernauld, 23-27, Odd Numbers, Main Street				55°57′44″N 3°58′28″W	Category C(S)	45780	Upload another image
St Mungo's Road, St Mungo's Church (Church Of Scotland), Including Halls, Steel Cross				55°56′50″N 3°59′33″W	Category B	46977	Upload another image
Dowanfield Road, Our Lady's High School With Former Janitors Houses And Technical Block				55°56′37″N 4°00′10″W	Category B	47481	Upload Photo
"The Black Bull", 43 Main Street (H.E.S. listing refers to its previous name "The Cross Keys")				55°57′43″N 3°58′31″W	Category C(S)	24075	Upload another image
Nos. 18 and 20 The Wynd				55°57′47″N 3°58′30″W	Category C(S)	24085	Upload another image
Cumbernauld House - Sundial				55°57′38″N 3°58′03″W	Category B	24087	Upload another image
Auchenkilns Bridge, Over Luggie Water				55°55′49″N 4°00′10″W	Category C(S)	24090	Upload another image
Castlecary, Putlock Bridge, Former Road Bridge Over Red Burn				55°58′53″N 3°56′43″W	Category C(S)	6682	Upload another image
Over Croy Farm, Croy (demolished 2012)				55°57′36″N 4°02′44″W	Category B		Upload Photo
35 Main Street				55°57′44″N 3°58′30″W	Category C(S)	24073	Upload Photo
72-80 Main St				55°57′43″N 3°58′37″W	Category C(S)	24084	Upload another image
Cumbernauld House				55°57′37″N 3°58′07″W	Category A	24086	Upload another image
Cumbernauld House - Doocot				55°57′48″N 3°57′40″W	Category B	24088	Upload another image
Mainhead Farmhouse And Attached Out-Buildings (now Caulders garden centre)				55°57′59″N 3°58′35″W	Category B	24089	Upload another image
Fannyside Mill				55°56′18″N 3°54′24″W	Category B	1073	Upload another image
Dullatur Village, Victoria Road, Stanley House, And Glenside				55°58′05″N 4°00′27″W	Category C(S)	121	Upload Photo
Parish Kirk Manse				55°57′40″N 3°58′55″W	Category C(S)	24069	Upload Photo
Banknock, Wyndford Lock, Lock Keeper's Cottage				55°59′11″N 3°57′49″W	Category B	1075	Upload another image
37-39 Main Street				55°57′44″N 3°58′31″W	Category C(S)	24074	Upload Photo
60 Main Street				55°57′44″N 3°58′34″W	Category C(S)	24080	Upload another image
Kyle Road, Kildrum, Sacred Heart Roman Catholic Church And Presbytery				55°57′06″N 3°58′35″W	Category A	24091	Upload another image See more images
Dullatur Village, Prospect Road, Woodend				55°58′04″N 4°00′44″W	Category A	1063	Upload Photo
40-54 Main St				55°57′45″N 3°58′32″W	Category C(S)	24078	Upload another image
56 Main Street				55°57′44″N 3°58′33″W	Category B	24079	Upload another image
64-68 Main Street				55°57′44″N 3°58′35″W	Category C(S)	24082	Upload another image
Auchenbee Farm				55°57′30″N 4°01′33″W	Category B	6449	Upload Photo
Dullatur Village, Victoria Road, Craigard				55°58′05″N 4°00′30″W	Category B	1039	Upload Photo
North Carbrain Road, Cumbernauld College, Including Walls And Railings				55°56′46″N 3°59′22″W	Category B	47482	Upload another image
Former U.F. Kirk, The Wynd				55°57′48″N 3°58′32″W	Category C(S)	24070	Upload another image
The Spur Inn, Cumbernauld				55°57′44″N 3°58′26″W	Category C(S)	24071	Upload another image
Luggiebank, Roadbridge Over Luggie Water				55°55′58″N 3°58′53″W	Category B	46705	Upload another image
Clouden Road, Kildrum Parish Church (Church Of Scotland), Including Hall And Manse				55°56′58″N 3°58′36″W	Category B	47480	Upload another image
Former Cumbernauld Cottage Theatre (single-storey cottage row) excluding all later additions to rear, Braehead Road, Cumbernauld				55°57′27″N 3°58′31″W	Category C	52631	Upload another image
Palacerigg Visitor Centre with mural by Alasdair Gray, Palacerigg Country Park, Cumbernauld				55°56′14″N 3°56′41″W	Category B	52610	Upload another image
Carbrain Totem, Glenhove Road				55°57′01″N 3°58′46″W	Category C	52419	Upload another image

== Key ==
The scheme for classifying buildings in Scotland is:

- Category A: "buildings of national or international importance, either architectural or historic; or fine, little-altered examples of some particular period, style or building type."
- Category B: "buildings of regional or more than local importance; or major examples of some particular period, style or building type, which may have been altered."
- Category C: "buildings of local importance; lesser examples of any period, style, or building type, as originally constructed or moderately altered; and simple traditional buildings which group well with other listed buildings."

In March 2016 there were 47,288 listed buildings in Scotland. Of these, 8% were Category A, and 50% were Category B, with the remaining 42% being Category C.

== See also ==
- List of listed buildings in North Lanarkshire
