= James Scanlan =

Scottish Roman Catholic prelate (1899–1976)

The Most Reverend James Scanlan
- Archbishop Emeritus of Glasgow
- Church: Roman Catholic
- Archdiocese: Glasgow
- Appointed: 29 January 1964
- Term ended: 23 April 1974
- Predecessor: Donald Campbell
- Successor: Thomas Winning
- Previous posts: Bishop of Dunkeld (1949–55); Bishop of Motherwell (1955–64)

Orders
- Ordination: 29 June 1929 by Francis Bourne
- Consecration: 20 June 1946 by William Godfrey

Personal details
- Born: 24 January 1899 Glasgow, Scotland
- Died: 25 March 1976 (aged 77) Marylebone, London, England
- Motto: Latin:Tantum ut Christo fruar

James Donald Scanlan (24 January 1899 – 25 March 1976) was a Scottish Roman Catholic prelate, who served first as the Bishop of Dunkeld, then Bishop of Motherwell, and ultimately Archbishop of Glasgow. Born in Glasgow, Scanlan intended to study medicine, but was sent to Sandhurst and served with the Highland Light Infantry. After military service, he earned a law degree from the University of Glasgow before deciding to enter the priesthood. He was ordained in 1929.

== Biography ==
James Donald Scanlan was born at 511 Duke Street in Glasgow on 24 January 1899, the fifth of the seven children of Joseph (1861–1950) and Sarah Veronica Walls Scanlan (1861–1922). His father was a medical practitioner. He was educated by the Marist Brothers at St Mungo's Academy and by the Jesuits of St Aloysius' College, Glasgow. In 1915, he commenced studies at the University of Glasgow intending to study medicine but was sent to the Royal Military College, Sandhurst to train as an army officer. Posted to the Highland Light Infantry, he saw service in East Africa and Egypt.

Scanlan returned to Glasgow in 1920 and graduated from the University of Glasgow with a Bachelor of Law degree in 1923. He worked briefly for a law firm before deciding to become a priest. Scanlan studied at St Edmund's College, Ware and was ordained a priest for the Westminster Archdiocese on 29 June 1929. In 1930, he earned a Licentiate of Canon Law from the Institut Catholique de Paris, and in 1932, a Doctorate in Canon Law from the Appollinare in Rome.

== Bishop of Dunkeld ==
Scanlan was appointed the Coadjutor Bishop of Dunkeld and Titular Bishop of Cyme by the Holy See on 27 April 1946. He was consecrated to the Episcopate on 20 June 1946. The principal consecrator was Cardinal William Godfrey, Archbishop of Westminster. The principal co-consecrators were Andrew Thomas McDonald, Archbishop of Saint Andrews and Edinburgh and Donald Alphonsus Campbell, Archbishop of Glasgow. On the death of Bishop John Toner on 31 May 1949, he automatically succeeded as the Diocesan Bishop of Dunkeld.

== Bishop of Motherwell ==
On 23 May 1955, Bishop Scanlan was translated to the Diocese of Motherwell to succeed Bishop Edward Douglas, who had resigned because of continuing ill-health. During Scanlan's nine-year tenure, thirteen new parishes were established and five new churches built in existing parishes.

== Archbishop of Glasgow ==
Scanlan was translated again to the Metropolitan see of Glasgow as archbishop on 29 January 1964. Between 1962 and 1965, he attended all the four sessions of the Second Vatican Council.

On 19 July 1969, the archbishop ceremonially cut the first turf for construction of the new St. Margaret of Scotland Hospice in Clydebank.

He retired on 23 April 1974 and assumed the title Archbishop Emeritus of Glasgow. He died on 25 March 1976, aged 77.

Catholic Church titles
Preceded by John Toner	Bishop of Dunkeld; 1949–1955	Succeeded by William Andrew Hart
Preceded by Edward Wilson Douglas	Bishop of Motherwell; 1955–1964	Succeeded by Francis A. S. W. Thomson
Preceded by Donald Alphonsus Campbell	Archbishop of Glasgow; 1964–1974	Succeeded by Thomas Joseph Winning
