= List of listed buildings in Bothwell, North Lanarkshire =

This is a list of listed buildings in the part of the parish of Bothwell that lies in North Lanarkshire, Scotland.

== List ==
Name	Location	Date listed	Grid ref. (Note: Sometimes known as OSGB36, the grid reference (where provided) is based on the British national grid reference system used by the Ordnance Survey. • "Guide to National Grid". Ordnance Survey. • "Get-a-map". Ordnance Survey.)	Geo-coordinates	Notes	LB number (Note: Historic Environment Scotland assign a unique alphanumeric identifier to each designated site in Scotland, for listed buildings this always begins with "LB", for example "LB12345".)	Image
1 And 2 Buchan Road, Carfin, Timber Bungalows				55°48′33″N 3°58′24″W	Category B	6664	Upload Photo
Chapelhall, St Aloysius (Rc Church) Including Presbytery, Boundary Walls And Gatepiers				55°50′27″N 3°56′44″W	Category C(S)	49607	Upload Photo
New Stevenston, Clydesdale Street, Primary School Including Boundary Walls And Railings				55°48′54″N 3°58′56″W	Category C(S)	50493	Upload Photo
Ruin Of Castle, Orbiston				55°48′00″N 4°01′32″W	Category C(S)	44575	Upload Photo
Chapelhall, Russell Street, Chapelhall Parish Church				55°50′33″N 3°56′47″W	Category B	19659	Upload Photo
3 New Road, Uddingston, "Auldearn"				55°49′45″N 4°05′24″W	Category B	44593	Upload Photo
Jerviston Railway Viaduct Over South Calder Water				55°48′16″N 3°59′36″W	Category B	6465	Upload Photo
Icehouse, Orbiston				55°47′55″N 4°01′17″W	Category C(S)	44576	Upload Photo
Mossend, Calder Road And Hope Street, Holy Family Roman Catholic Church With Presbytery And Church Hall				55°49′08″N 4°00′25″W	Category B	50147	Upload Photo
The Roman Bridge				55°47′53″N 4°01′45″W	Category B	44577	Upload Photo
Roundknowe Road Bridge At Calderpark Over North Calder Water				55°50′12″N 4°06′26″W	Category B	6466	Upload Photo
Bellshill, Main Street, Bellshill West Church Including Boundary Walls And Piers				55°49′09″N 4°01′59″W	Category B	6467	Upload Photo

== Key ==
The scheme for classifying buildings in Scotland is:

- Category A: "buildings of national or international importance, either architectural or historic; or fine, little-altered examples of some particular period, style or building type."
- Category B: "buildings of regional or more than local importance; or major examples of some particular period, style or building type, which may have been altered."
- Category C: "buildings of local importance; lesser examples of any period, style, or building type, as originally constructed or moderately altered; and simple traditional buildings which group well with other listed buildings."

In March 2016 there were 47,288 listed buildings in Scotland. Of these, 8% were Category A, and 50% were Category B, with the remaining 42% being Category C.

== See also ==
- List of listed buildings in North Lanarkshire
