= List of listed buildings in Shotts, North Lanarkshire =

This is a list of listed buildings in the parish of Shotts in North Lanarkshire, Scotland.

== List ==
Name	Location	Date Listed	Grid Ref. (Note: Sometimes known as OSGB36, the grid reference (where provided) is based on the British national grid reference system used by the Ordnance Survey. • "Guide to National Grid". Ordnance Survey. • "Get-a-map". Ordnance Survey.)	Geo-coordinates	Notes	LB Number (Note: Historic Environment Scotland assign a unique alphanumeric identifier to each designated site in Scotland, for listed buildings this always begins with "LB", for example "LB12345".)	Image
Kirk Of Shotts And Graveyard				55°50′45″N 3°50′59″W	Category B	18228	Upload another image See more images
South Calder Bridge (West Of Murdostoun Castle)				55°47′41″N 3°53′25″W	Category B	18439	Upload Photo
Hartwood, Hartwood Hospital, Nurses' Home				55°48′32″N 3°50′26″W	Category C(S)	49672	Upload Photo
84 Station Road, St Patrick's Roman Catholic Church And Presbytery				55°49′10″N 3°47′45″W	Category B	50146	Upload Photo
Greystone Farm				55°52′23″N 3°55′25″W	Category C(S)	18229	Upload Photo
Shotts, Calderhead Road, Centrelink 5 (Former Cummins Engine Company Ltd), Including Boiler House To Nw And Entrance Gates				55°49′39″N 3°49′02″W	Category A	50013	Upload Photo
Murdostoun Estate, West Lodge, Including Gatepiers				55°47′51″N 3°53′32″W	Category B	18440	Upload Photo
Easter Moffat House				55°52′23″N 3°55′19″W	Category B	18230	Upload Photo
Murdostoun Castle				55°47′41″N 3°52′30″W	Category B	14187	Upload another image
Murdostoun Castle Dovecot				55°47′41″N 3°52′20″W	Category B	14188	Upload Photo
Murdostoun Castle, Wellhead				55°47′41″N 3°52′20″W	Category B	14189	Upload Photo
Murdostoun Castle, Lodge				55°47′44″N 3°51′32″W	Category B	14190	Upload Photo
Hartwood, Hartwood Hospital				55°48′36″N 3°50′53″W	Category B	43858	Upload Photo
Furnace Bank And Hot Blast Tower, Shotts Ironworks, Burnbrae Road				55°49′06″N 3°47′23″W	Category B	43491	Upload another image
Fortissat House				55°50′00″N 3°49′52″W	Category C(S)	14192	Upload Photo
Easter Moffat House, Former Stables				55°52′23″N 3°55′25″W	Category C(S)	18231	Upload Photo

== Key ==
The scheme for classifying buildings in Scotland is:

- Category A: "buildings of national or international importance, either architectural or historic; or fine, little-altered examples of some particular period, style or building type."
- Category B: "buildings of regional or more than local importance; or major examples of some particular period, style or building type, which may have been altered."
- Category C: "buildings of local importance; lesser examples of any period, style, or building type, as originally constructed or moderately altered; and simple traditional buildings which group well with other listed buildings."

In March 2016 there were 47,288 listed buildings in Scotland. Of these, 8% were Category A, and 50% were Category B, with the remaining 42% being Category C.

== See also ==
- List of listed buildings in North Lanarkshire
