= List of listed buildings in Kilsyth, North Lanarkshire =

This is a list of listed buildings in the parish of Kilsyth in North Lanarkshire, Scotland.

== List ==
Name	Location	Date Listed	Grid Ref. (Note: Sometimes known as OSGB36, the grid reference (where provided) is based on the British national grid reference system used by the Ordnance Survey. • "Guide to National Grid". Ordnance Survey. • "Get-a-map". Ordnance Survey.)	Geo-coordinates	Notes	LB Number (Note: Historic Environment Scotland assign a unique alphanumeric identifier to each designated site in Scotland, for listed buildings this always begins with "LB", for example "LB12345".)	Image
The Co-Operative 7 Market Close				55°58′32″N 4°03′20″W	Category C(S)	36227	Upload Photo
Bentend Steading, Nr Carron Bridge				56°01′42″N 4°01′43″W	Category B	12990	Upload Photo
Kilsyth, Forth And Clyde Canal, Craigmarloch Stables				55°58′27″N 4°01′31″W	Category B	50227	Upload another image
Garrel Mill House				55°58′51″N 4°03′11″W	Category B	36228	Upload another image
Main Street Nos 55/63				55°58′37″N 4°03′24″W	Category B	36231	Upload Photo
Market Chambers Nos 6, 7, 8, 9 And 10 Market Place				55°58′35″N 4°03′20″W	Category B	36224	Upload Photo
Nos 48 And 50 Market Street				55°58′35″N 4°03′15″W	Category C(S)	36226	Upload Photo
Balmalloch Road, Brownville With Garden Walls And Gatepiers				55°58′40″N 4°04′08″W	Category B	36233	Upload Photo
Colzium				55°59′02″N 4°02′20″W	Category B	36230	Upload another image See more images
Glenhead Cottage, High Banton				55°59′50″N 4°00′34″W	Category C(S)	13350	Upload Photo
Old Graveyard And Watch-House, Howe Road				55°58′14″N 4°03′27″W	Category B	36223	Upload another image See more images
Garrell Mill				55°58′50″N 4°03′10″W	Category B	36229	Upload Photo
30 Low Craigends, St Patrick's Roman Catholic Church				55°58′31″N 4°03′11″W	Category A	36234	Upload Photo
Parish Church Backbrae Street				55°58′33″N 4°03′32″W	Category B	36222	Upload Photo
36-42 (Even Nos) Main Street (White House Building)				55°58′36″N 4°03′21″W	Category B	36232	Upload another image
Pump, Market Place				55°58′34″N 4°03′18″W	Category C(S)	36225	Upload another image
Carron Bridge				56°01′40″N 4°01′18″W	Category B	11749	Upload Photo

== Key ==
The scheme for classifying buildings in Scotland is:

- Category A: "buildings of national or international importance, either architectural or historic; or fine, little-altered examples of some particular period, style or building type."
- Category B: "buildings of regional or more than local importance; or major examples of some particular period, style or building type, which may have been altered."
- Category C: "buildings of local importance; lesser examples of any period, style, or building type, as originally constructed or moderately altered; and simple traditional buildings which group well with other listed buildings."

In March 2016 there were 47,288 listed buildings in Scotland. Of these, 8% were Category A, and 50% were Category B, with the remaining 42% being Category C.

== See also ==
- List of listed buildings in North Lanarkshire
