= List of listed buildings in New Monkland, North Lanarkshire =

This is a list of listed buildings in the parish of New Monkland in North Lanarkshire, Scotland.

== List ==
Name	Location	Date listed	Grid ref. (Note: Sometimes known as OSGB36, the grid reference (where provided) is based on the British national grid reference system used by the Ordnance Survey. • "Guide to National Grid". Ordnance Survey. • "Get-a-map". Ordnance Survey.)	Geo-coordinates	Notes	LB number (Note: Historic Environment Scotland assign a unique alphanumeric identifier to each designated site in Scotland, for listed buildings this always begins with "LB", for example "LB12345".)	Image
Cleddans Former Stables				55°54′32″N 4°00′48″W	Category B	14208	Upload Photo
Glenboig, Glenboig Farm Road, Glenboig Farmhouse				55°54′01″N 4°02′16″W	Category B	19250	Upload Photo
Parish Church				55°53′12″N 3°59′44″W	Category B	19676	Upload another image See more images
Millcroft Former Cornmill				55°55′27″N 3°59′56″W	Category B	18438	Upload Photo
Rochsoles				55°53′13″N 3°59′21″W	Category B	14205	Upload Photo
Glenvmavis, Yetts Hole Road, Braidenhill Farmhouse				55°52′54″N 4°00′49″W	Category B	19251	Upload Photo
Watch House And Churchyard				55°53′12″N 3°59′42″W	Category B	14204	Upload another image
Auchingray				55°53′17″N 3°50′45″W	Category C(S)	14206	Upload Photo
Cleddans House And Garden Terrace Steps To South				55°54′30″N 4°00′47″W	Category B	14207	Upload Photo

== Key ==
The scheme for classifying buildings in Scotland is:

- Category A: "buildings of national or international importance, either architectural or historic; or fine, little-altered examples of some particular period, style or building type."
- Category B: "buildings of regional or more than local importance; or major examples of some particular period, style or building type, which may have been altered."
- Category C: "buildings of local importance; lesser examples of any period, style, or building type, as originally constructed or moderately altered; and simple traditional buildings which group well with other listed buildings."

In March 2016 there were 47,288 listed buildings in Scotland. Of these, 8% were Category A, and 50% were Category B, with the remaining 42% being Category C.

== See also ==
- List of listed buildings in North Lanarkshire
