= List of listed buildings in Coatbridge, North Lanarkshire =

This is a list of listed buildings in the parish of Coatbridge in North Lanarkshire, Scotland.

== List ==
Name	Location	Date Listed	Grid Ref. (Note: Sometimes known as OSGB36, the grid reference (where provided) is based on the British national grid reference system used by the Ordnance Survey. • "Guide to National Grid". Ordnance Survey. • "Get-a-map". Ordnance Survey.)	Geo-coordinates	Notes	LB Number (Note: Historic Environment Scotland assign a unique alphanumeric identifier to each designated site in Scotland, for listed buildings this always begins with "LB", for example "LB12345".)	Image
Kirkshaws Road, Kirkstyle Cottages				55°50′44″N 4°02′56″W	Category B	23017	Upload another image
59-65 (Odd Nos) Main Street And 1 Church Street				55°51′46″N 4°01′37″W	Category B	23020	Upload Photo
Graveyard				55°50′42″N 4°02′59″W	Category B	22996	Upload Photo
Drumpellier Farm				55°51′50″N 4°03′10″W	Category B	23000	Upload Photo
Central Station (Now Pullmans) K6 Telephone Kiosk				55°51′45″N 4°01′53″W	Category B	23009	Upload Photo
Hozier Street, St Mary (Rc Church) Including Presbytery, Hall, Boundary Walls And Gatepiers				55°51′10″N 4°01′19″W	Category B	49590	Upload Photo
Bank Street And Blair Road, Langloan Primary School With Boundary Walls, Gatepiers And Railings				55°51′28″N 4°02′40″W	Category C(S)	49862	Upload another image
163 Bank Street, (Former Union Bank) Including Boundary Walls And Gatepiers				55°51′35″N 4°02′12″W	Category C(S)	49869	Upload Photo
1 Ross Street And 1 - 13 (Odd Nos) Bank Street				55°51′42″N 4°01′52″W	Category C(S)	50160	Upload Photo
St Patrick's Roman Catholic Church, Including Walls, Piers, Gates And Fencing, Main Street, Coatbridge				55°51′45″N 4°01′32″W	Category B	42895	Upload Photo
Coltswood Road, Greenhill Primary School, Including Boundary Walls, Railings And Gates				55°52′09″N 4°01′29″W	Category B	23015	Upload Photo
453 Main Street, Monklands District Magistrates Court				55°51′35″N 4°00′34″W	Category B	23021	Upload Photo
School Street, Whifflet Primary School, Including Boundary Walls, Gatepiers, Railings And Gates				55°51′02″N 4°01′21″W	Category C(S)	23022	Upload Photo
Weir Street, Dunbeth Church, Including Boundary Wall				55°51′55″N 4°01′25″W	Category B	23023	Upload Photo
Muiryhall Street East, Former Coatdyke Parish Church, Including Hall, Boundary Walls And Gatepiers				55°51′42″N 4°00′29″W	Category C(S)	23024	Upload Photo
Gartsherrie Parish Church				55°51′52″N 4°01′37″W	Category B	22997	Upload Photo
St John Street St John The Evangelist Episcopal Church				55°51′48″N 4°01′29″W	Category C(S)	23005	Upload Photo
31 Muiryhall Street				55°51′49″N 4°01′16″W	Category C(S)	23008	Upload Photo
Chisholm Street, K6 Telephone Kiosk				55°52′11″N 4°01′09″W	Category B	23010	Upload Photo
Dundyvan Road, St Augustine (Rc Church) Including Sacristy, Presbytery, Hall, Boundary Walls And Gatepiers				55°51′31″N 4°02′10″W	Category B	49591	Upload another image See more images
West Canal Street And Heritage Way, Former Caledonian Railway Station, With Gatepiers And Railings				55°51′45″N 4°01′53″W	Category C(S)	49871	Upload Photo
West Lodge Drumpellier Park				55°51′26″N 4°03′30″W	Category B	22998	Upload Photo
Dundyvan Church Henderson Street Oxford Street And Kirk Street				55°51′28″N 4°01′59″W	Category B	23001	Upload Photo
Heritage Way, Summerlee Gatehouse Including Boundary Wall				55°51′47″N 4°01′52″W	Category C(S)	49870	Upload Photo
Railway And Foot Bridge Over Former Monkland Canal (West Bridge) Including Access Stair Building				55°51′43″N 4°01′54″W	Category B	49873	Upload Photo
27, 29 Main Street, Coia's Building				55°51′46″N 4°01′43″W	Category C(S)	23019	Upload Photo
Holy Trinity And All Saints Roman Catholic Church, Muiryhall Street East And Quarry Street				55°51′41″N 4°00′22″W	Category C(S)	23004	Upload another image
Lamberton's Engineering Works, Sunnyside Road And Russell Colt Street				55°52′04″N 4°01′43″W	Category B	23011	Upload Photo
Academy Street, Carnegie Library, Including Boundary Wall And Gatepiers				55°51′48″N 4°01′43″W	Category B	23012	Upload another image
51 Blairhill Street, Kenilworth House				55°51′53″N 4°02′23″W	Category B	46093	Upload Photo
Old Monkland Church				55°50′45″N 4°02′59″W	Category B	22995	Upload another image See more images
Burial Place Of The Buchannans Of Drumpellier, West Lodge				55°51′29″N 4°03′32″W	Category B	22999	Upload Photo
Gartsherrie Road, Sunnyside Station				55°52′01″N 4°01′42″W	Category B	23003	Upload Photo
Calder Street/26 Bute Street, Calder Parish Church, Including Manse, Gatepiers And Railings				55°51′06″N 4°01′04″W	Category B	23007	Upload another image See more images
Railway Bridge Over Coatbridge Cross				55°51′44″N 4°01′48″W	Category B	49872	Upload Photo
Main Street, Whitelaw Memorial Fountain				55°51′44″N 4°01′44″W	Category C(S)	50508	Upload another image See more images
5 Carradale Road, Former Cattle Market, Including Lodge, Outbuilding, Gatepiers And Walls Facing West Canal Street, And Wall At Carradale Road				55°51′41″N 4°02′04″W	Category B	23014	Upload Photo
Albert Street, Coatbridge High School, Including Gatepiers,_Boundary Walls And Railings				55°51′56″N 4°01′26″W	Category C(S)	23013	Upload Photo
Dunbeth Road, Municipal Buildings, Including Boundary Walls,_Railings, Gatepiers And Gates				55°51′50″N 4°01′19″W	Category B	23016	Upload another image
Coats Church Jackson Street And Muiryhall Street				55°51′47″N 4°01′09″W	Category B	23002	Upload Photo
Gartsherrie Road, Gartsherrie Primary School				55°52′09″N 4°02′29″W	Category C(S)	49606	Upload Photo
Main Street, Airdrie Savings Bank				55°51′45″N 4°01′45″W	Category B	23018	Upload Photo
Academy Street, Gartsherrie Academy Primary School Including Playground Walls				55°51′50″N 4°01′40″W	Category B	23006	Upload Photo
Bank Street, Coatbridge War Memorial				55°51′28″N 4°02′36″W	Category C(S)	50509	Upload another image

== Key ==
The scheme for classifying buildings in Scotland is:

- Category A: "buildings of national or international importance, either architectural or historic; or fine, little-altered examples of some particular period, style or building type."
- Category B: "buildings of regional or more than local importance; or major examples of some particular period, style or building type, which may have been altered."
- Category C: "buildings of local importance; lesser examples of any period, style, or building type, as originally constructed or moderately altered; and simple traditional buildings which group well with other listed buildings."

In March 2016 there were 47,288 listed buildings in Scotland. Of these, 8% were Category A, and 50% were Category B, with the remaining 42% being Category C.

== See also ==
- List of listed buildings in North Lanarkshire
