= St Ignatius Church, Wishaw =

Coordinates: 55.7745°N 3.9155°W

Saint Ignatius Church, Wishaw
- Saint Ignatius Church, Wishaw
- Location: Wishaw
- Country: Scotland
- Denomination: Roman Catholic
- Website: https://saintignatiuswishaw.org.uk/index.html

History
- Status: Parish church
- Founded: 1859; 167 years ago
- Dedication: Saint Ignatius of Loyola

Architecture
- Heritage designation: Category A listed
- Architect: George Goldie
- Style: Gothic Revival
- Completed: 1865

Administration
- Diocese: Motherwell

Clergy
- Bishop: Joseph Toal

St Ignatius Church is a Roman Catholic parish church in the town of Wishaw in North Lanarkshire, Scotland, within the Diocese of Motherwell. The church building was constructed in 1865, and is a category A listed building. It was designed by George Goldie in a Gothic revival style. The Church now holds about 1100 residents every Saturday and Sunday. Prominent priests since the sixties include Mgr O'Donnell, Fr Trench, Fr McGlinchey, Fr Morris, Canon McGovern.

== Services ==
Sunday Masses: 10am; 7pm; Vigil Mass Saturday at 4pm. Holidays of obligation: 9.30am; 7pm. Weekdays from Monday to Friday - please see weekly bulletin. Rosary half an hour before weekday Masses.

== Clergy ==
- Rev. John Black, 1859–60
- Very Rev. John Canon McCay, 1860–93
- Rev. Joseph Van Hecke, 1893–1927
- Rt. Rev. Mgr Octavius F. Claeys, 1928
- Very Rev. Thomas Canon Kearney, 1929–66
- Rt. Rev. Mgr John O'Donnell, 1967–84
- Very Rev. Patrick Canon McGovern, 1984–98
- Rt. Rev. Mgr Michael J. Conway, 1998–2012
- Rev. Gerard Maguiness, 2012–20
- Rev. Stephen Rooney, 2020–24
- Rev. Kevin Lawrie, 2024–present

== See also ==
- List of Category A listed buildings in North Lanarkshire
- List of listed buildings in Motherwell And Wishaw, North Lanarkshire
