= List of listed buildings in Old Monkland, North Lanarkshire =

This is a list of listed buildings in the parish of Old Monkland in North Lanarkshire, Scotland.

== List ==
Name	Location	Date Listed	Grid Ref. (Note: Sometimes known as OSGB36, the grid reference (where provided) is based on the British national grid reference system used by the Ordnance Survey. • "Guide to National Grid". Ordnance Survey. • "Get-a-map". Ordnance Survey.)	Geo-coordinates	Notes	LB Number (Note: Historic Environment Scotland assign a unique alphanumeric identifier to each designated site in Scotland, for listed buildings this always begins with "LB", for example "LB12345".)	Image
Calderbank Calderbank Parish Church				55°50′45″N 3°57′56″W	Category C(S)	19253	Upload another image
Glenboig Church Of Scotland				55°53′36″N 4°02′35″W	Category C(S)	19137	Upload Photo
Bargeddie, Coatbridge Road, Drumpark Special School Including Lodge				55°51′26″N 4°04′00″W	Category B	19252	Upload Photo
Sykeside Road, High Palacecraig House				55°50′57″N 3°59′20″W	Category B	18914	Upload another image
Bargeddie, Coatbridge Road, Bargeddie Primary School Including Boundary Wall And Gatepiers				55°51′26″N 4°04′35″W	Category C(S)	49534	Upload Photo
Caldercruix, Main Street, Longriggend And Meadowfield Church Including Gatepiers And Boundary Wall				55°53′15″N 3°53′25″W	Category C(S)	19254	Upload another image See more images

== Key ==
The scheme for classifying buildings in Scotland is:

- Category A: "buildings of national or international importance, either architectural or historic; or fine, little-altered examples of some particular period, style or building type."
- Category B: "buildings of regional or more than local importance; or major examples of some particular period, style or building type, which may have been altered."
- Category C: "buildings of local importance; lesser examples of any period, style, or building type, as originally constructed or moderately altered; and simple traditional buildings which group well with other listed buildings."

In March 2016 there were 47,288 listed buildings in Scotland. Of these, 8% were Category A, and 50% were Category B, with the remaining 42% being Category C.

== See also ==
- List of listed buildings in North Lanarkshire
