= List of listed buildings in Motherwell And Wishaw, North Lanarkshire =

This is a list of listed buildings in the parish of Motherwell And Wishaw in North Lanarkshire, Scotland.

== List ==
Name	Location	Date listed	Grid ref. (Note: Sometimes known as OSGB36, the grid reference (where provided) is based on the British national grid reference system used by the Ordnance Survey. • "Guide to National Grid". Ordnance Survey. • "Get-a-map". Ordnance Survey.)	Geo-coordinates	Notes	LB number (Note: Historic Environment Scotland assign a unique alphanumeric identifier to each designated site in Scotland, for listed buildings this always begins with "LB", for example "LB12345".)	Image
Cambusnethan, Kirk Road, Cambusnethan Old Parish Church (Church Of Scotland) Including Church Hall, Vestry And Session House, War Memorial, Boundary Wall, Gatepiers, Gates And Railings				55°46′36″N 3°54′16″W	Category C(S)	38235	Upload another image
Motherwell, Manse Road, Old Dalzell Manse Including Coach House				55°46′20″N 3°59′13″W	Category B	38241	Upload Photo
Motherwell, South Calder Water, Jerviston Railway Viaduct				55°48′16″N 3°59′36″W	Category B	38242	Upload another image See more images
Motherwell, 83 Camp Road, Camp Cottage (Also Known As Archibald's Temple)				55°46′45″N 3°59′52″W	Category C(S)	38245	Upload Photo
Wishaw, 9-35 (Odd Nos) Banchory Road, The Coach House				55°47′09″N 3°55′03″W	Category B	47346	Upload Photo
Wishaw, West Thornlie Street, Thornlie Parish Church, Church Of Scotland Former United Free Church Including Hall Gates And Boundary Walls				55°46′19″N 3°55′21″W	Category C(S)	47505	Upload another image
Wishaw, 2 Belhaven Road				55°46′35″N 3°55′41″W	Category B	47936	Upload Photo
Wishaw, 47 Clelland Road, Including Boundary Wall				55°46′39″N 3°55′50″W	Category B	47939	Upload Photo
Wishaw, 161 Kirk Road Including Boundary Wall				55°46′37″N 3°54′49″W	Category C(S)	47946	Upload Photo
Wishaw, 2 Kirk Road				55°46′24″N 3°55′09″W	Category B	47949	Upload Photo
Wishaw, 177-191(Odd Nos) Main Street And 2-20 (Even) Belhaven Terrace, Cylde Chambers				55°46′32″N 3°55′26″W	Category C(S)	47953	Upload Photo
Wishaw, Stewarton Street, Stewarton Street Park, Marker Post				55°46′03″N 3°54′32″W	Category C(S)	47961	Upload Photo
Wishaw, 11 Walter Street				55°46′35″N 3°54′19″W	Category C(S)	47964	Upload Photo
Motherwell, 33 And 35 Hamilton Road, Motherwell Public Library				55°47′21″N 3°59′39″W	Category B	48307	Upload another image
Wishaw, 59-69 (Odd Nos) Kirk Road, Mecca Bingo (Formerly Green's Playhouse)				55°46′28″N 3°55′06″W	Category C(S)	49605	Upload Photo
Motherwell, Dalzell Park, Gazebo				55°46′17″N 3°59′08″W	Category C(S)	38240	Upload Photo
Motherwell, 78 Muir Street, Gospel Literature Outreach Centre (Formerly Dalziel Free Church) Including Church Hall, Manse And Boundary Wall				55°47′31″N 3°59′36″W	Category B	38244	Upload another image See more images
Wishaw, 57-59 (Odd Nos) Main Street				55°46′27″N 3°55′16″W	Category C(S)	47951	Upload Photo
Wishaw, 231 - 257 (Odd Nos) Main Street				55°46′33″N 3°55′30″W	Category C(S)	47954	Upload Photo
Wishaw, 206-216 (Even Numbers) Main Street				55°46′32″N 3°55′23″W	Category C(S)	47958	Upload Photo
Wishaw, Young Street, St Ignatius Roman Catholic Church Including Boundary Wall And Gate Pier				55°46′28″N 3°54′55″W	Category A	47975	Upload Photo
Motherwell, Burnside Street, Burngrange Lodge Including Boundary Wall And Gate Piers				55°46′38″N 3°58′15″W	Category C(S)	48300	Upload Photo
Motherwell, 114 Hamilton Road, The Moorings House Hotel				55°47′19″N 3°59′53″W	Category C(S)	48308	Upload Photo
Motherwell, 225 Manse Road, North Lodge Including Gatepiers, Gate And Railings				55°46′35″N 3°59′03″W	Category C(S)	48310	Upload another image
Motherwell, 344 Muir Street (Formerly St Andrews Parish Church)				55°47′40″N 3°59′47″W	Category C(S)	48313	Upload Photo
Motherwell, 15 Orchard Street, Crosshill Manse Including Boundary Wall And Gate Piers				55°47′23″N 3°59′50″W	Category B	48314	Upload Photo
Motherwell, Windmillhill Street, South Dalziel Parish Church (Church Of Scotland) Including Vestry, Session House, Church Hall And Boundary Wall				55°47′02″N 3°58′48″W	Category B	38237	Upload another image
Wishaw, Glen Road, Belhaven Estate, The Coach House				55°47′10″N 3°56′10″W	Category C(S)	47942	Upload Photo
Wishaw, Kenilworth Avenue, Reformed Presbyterian Church Including Boundary Wall And Railings				55°46′30″N 3°55′14″W	Category C(S)	47944	Upload Photo
Wishaw, 9 Kenilworth Avenue, Reformed Presbertyrian Church Manse				55°46′30″N 3°55′16″W	Category C(S)	47945	Upload Photo
Wishaw, 155-175 (Odd Nos) Main Street And 1-11 (Odd Nos) Belhaven Terrace, Richmond Place				55°46′31″N 3°55′24″W	Category B	47952	Upload Photo
Wishaw, 40-50 (Even Nos) Main St				55°46′27″N 3°55′12″W	Category C(S)	47957	Upload Photo
Wishaw, 5 Stewarton Street				55°46′24″N 3°55′08″W	Category C(S)	47962	Upload Photo
Cambusnethan, Kirk Road, Cambusnethan North Parish Church Including Church Hall And Boundary Wall (Church Of Scotland Formerly Free Church)				55°46′38″N 3°54′09″W	Category C(S)	48015	Upload Photo
Motherwell, Avon Street, Holy Trinity Episcopal Church				55°47′18″N 3°59′42″W	Category C(S)	48296	Upload Photo
Motherwell, Dalzell Park, St Patrick's Well				55°46′17″N 3°59′09″W	Category C(S)	48303	Upload another image
Motherwell, Windmillhill Street, Drinking Fountain				55°47′10″N 3°59′05″W	Category C(S)	48316	Upload Photo
Motherwell, 2-44 (Even Nos) Scott Street And 64 Dalziel Street (Former Dalziel Co-Operative Society Building)				55°47′32″N 3°59′12″W	Category B	38246	Upload Photo
Wishaw, Ballater Crescent, Marker Post				55°47′02″N 3°54′58″W	Category C(S)	47935	Upload Photo
Wishaw, 19-21 Campbell Street				55°46′30″N 3°54′52″W	Category C(S)	47937	Upload Photo
Wishaw, 2 Coltness Road And 279 Kirk Road				55°46′40″N 3°54′26″W	Category C(S)	47940	Upload Photo
Wishaw, 32-38 (Even Nos) Main Street				55°46′26″N 3°55′12″W	Category C(S)	47956	Upload Photo
Wishaw, 147 Stewarton Street, Coltness Masonic Lodge				55°46′17″N 3°54′54″W	Category C(S)	47963	Upload Photo
Motherwell, 301 Brandon Street, Motherwell Ymca				55°47′13″N 3°59′07″W	Category B	48299	Upload Photo
Motherwell, 23-27 Hope Street, Motherwell Masonic Halls				55°47′33″N 3°59′37″W	Category C(S)	48309	Upload Photo
Motherwell, Merry Street, Dalziel Parish Church ( Church Of Scotland) Including Church Hall And Boundary Wall				55°47′28″N 3°59′32″W	Category B	48311	Upload Photo
Wishaw, 6 West Thornlie St, Thornile Manse				55°46′20″N 3°55′20″W	Category B	45577	Upload Photo
Wishaw, Main Street, Wishaw Old Parish Church (Church Of Scotland)				55°46′31″N 3°55′18″W	Category B	47504	Upload Photo
Wishaw 3-19 (Odd Nos) Main Street And 2 Caledonian Road				55°46′25″N 3°55′12″W	Category C(S)	47950	Upload Photo
Calder Bridge, Wishaw Low Road And Glen Road, Wishaw				55°47′08″N 3°55′40″W	Category C(S)	48014	Upload another image See more images
Motherwell, Windmillhill Street, Motherwell Baptist Church Including Church Hall				55°47′10″N 3°59′03″W	Category C(S)	48317	Upload Photo
141-145 (Odd Nos) Main Street, Ymca Building				55°46′30″N 3°55′23″W	Category C(S)	49232	Upload Photo
Cambusnethan, Kirk Road, Former Parish Church Including Boundary Wall And Cemetery (Church Of Scotland)				55°46′37″N 3°54′13″W	Category B	38236	Upload Photo
Motherwell, Dalzell Park, Hamilton Of Dalzell Mausoleum And St Patrick's Graveyard Including Boundary Walls				55°46′16″N 3°59′10″W	Category B	38239	Upload another image
Motherwell, Mill Road, The Old Mill Hotel (Formerly Motherwell Mill)				55°47′56″N 3°59′06″W	Category C(S)	38243	Upload Photo
Wishaw, Glasgow Road, St Patricks Roman Catholic Church And Presbytery Including Stone Steps And Concourse				55°46′46″N 3°57′22″W	Category C(S)	47941	Upload another image
Wishaw, 325 North Dryburgh Road, Bellside Lodge Including Boundary Wall And Railings				55°47′39″N 3°54′49″W	Category C(S)	47960	Upload Photo
Motherwell, Crawford Street, Dalziel High School				55°47′13″N 4°00′00″W	Category C(S)	48302	Upload Photo
Motherwell, Park Street, Dalzell Steelworks: Offices And Workshops Fronting Park Street				55°47′19″N 3°58′58″W	Category B	48315	Upload Photo
Wishaw, 57 Kirk Road, Former Cinema				55°46′27″N 3°55′08″W	Category C(S)	49604	Upload Photo
Wishaw, Belhaven Terrace, St Andrews Episcopal Church Including Boundary Wall				55°46′30″N 3°55′25″W	Category C(S)	45605	Upload Photo
Motherwell, Dalzell House Including Wellhead, Coach House, Stables And Terraced Garden				55°46′20″N 3°58′41″W	Category A	38238	Upload Photo
Wishaw, East Academy Street, Chalmers Parish Church Including Church Hall And Boundary Wall (Church Of Scotland Formerly United Presbertyrian)				55°46′20″N 3°55′08″W	Category C(S)	47503	Upload another image
Wishaw, 307 Kirk Road, Vine Cottage				55°46′39″N 3°54′18″W	Category C(S)	47948	Upload Photo
Wishaw, 26-30 (Even Nos) Main Street				55°46′26″N 3°55′11″W	Category C(S)	47955	Upload Photo
Wishaw, Main Street And Kenilworth Avenue Former Coltness Gatehouse				55°46′28″N 3°55′15″W	Category B	47959	Upload Photo
Motherwell, Brandon Street, Evangelical Union Congregational Church Including Boundary Wall And Gatepiers				55°47′16″N 3°59′11″W	Category C(S)	48297	Upload Photo
Motherwell, Coursington Road, Our Lady Of Good Aid, Roman Catholic Cathedral Including Presbytery, Boundary Wall, Gatepiers And Railings				55°47′29″N 3°59′14″W	Category B	48301	Upload Photo
Motherwell, Dalzell Park, The Sow Bridge Including Feeder Pond, Rill And Cascade				55°46′21″N 3°58′56″W	Category C(S)	48304	Upload another image See more images
Motherwell, Hamilton Road, Former Motherwell Town Hall				55°47′23″N 3°59′40″W	Category C(S)	48305	Upload another image
Motherwell 1 Hamilton Road And 1, 3-15 (Odd Nos) Muir Street				55°47′26″N 3°59′36″W	Category C(S)	48306	Upload Photo
Motherwell, 31-37 (Odd Nos) Merry Street, The Railway Tavern				55°47′28″N 3°59′32″W	Category C(S)	48312	Upload Photo
Wishaw, 43-45 Clelland Road Including Boundary Wall				55°46′38″N 3°55′50″W	Category C(S)	47938	Upload Photo
Wishaw, 9 Glencairn Avenue, Craigneuk				55°46′45″N 3°57′15″W	Category C(S)	47943	Upload Photo
Wishaw, 177 Kirk Road Including Boundary Wall				55°46′38″N 3°54′43″W	Category C(S)	47947	Upload Photo
Wishaw, Waterloo Dimsdale Road, Pather Farmhouse				55°45′45″N 3°54′38″W	Category B	47974	Upload Photo
Motherwell, 273-287(Odd), 291 And 293 Brandon Street				55°47′13″N 3°59′09″W	Category C(S)	48298	Upload Photo

== Key ==
The scheme for classifying buildings in Scotland is:

- Category A: "buildings of national or international importance, either architectural or historic; or fine, little-altered examples of some particular period, style or building type."
- Category B: "buildings of regional or more than local importance; or major examples of some particular period, style or building type, which may have been altered."
- Category C: "buildings of local importance; lesser examples of any period, style, or building type, as originally constructed or moderately altered; and simple traditional buildings which group well with other listed buildings."

In March 2016 there were 47,288 listed buildings in Scotland. Of these, 8% were Category A, and 50% were Category B, with the remaining 42% being Category C.

== See also ==
- List of listed buildings in North Lanarkshire
