= Coatbridge Municipal Buildings =

Municipal building in Coatbridge, Scotland

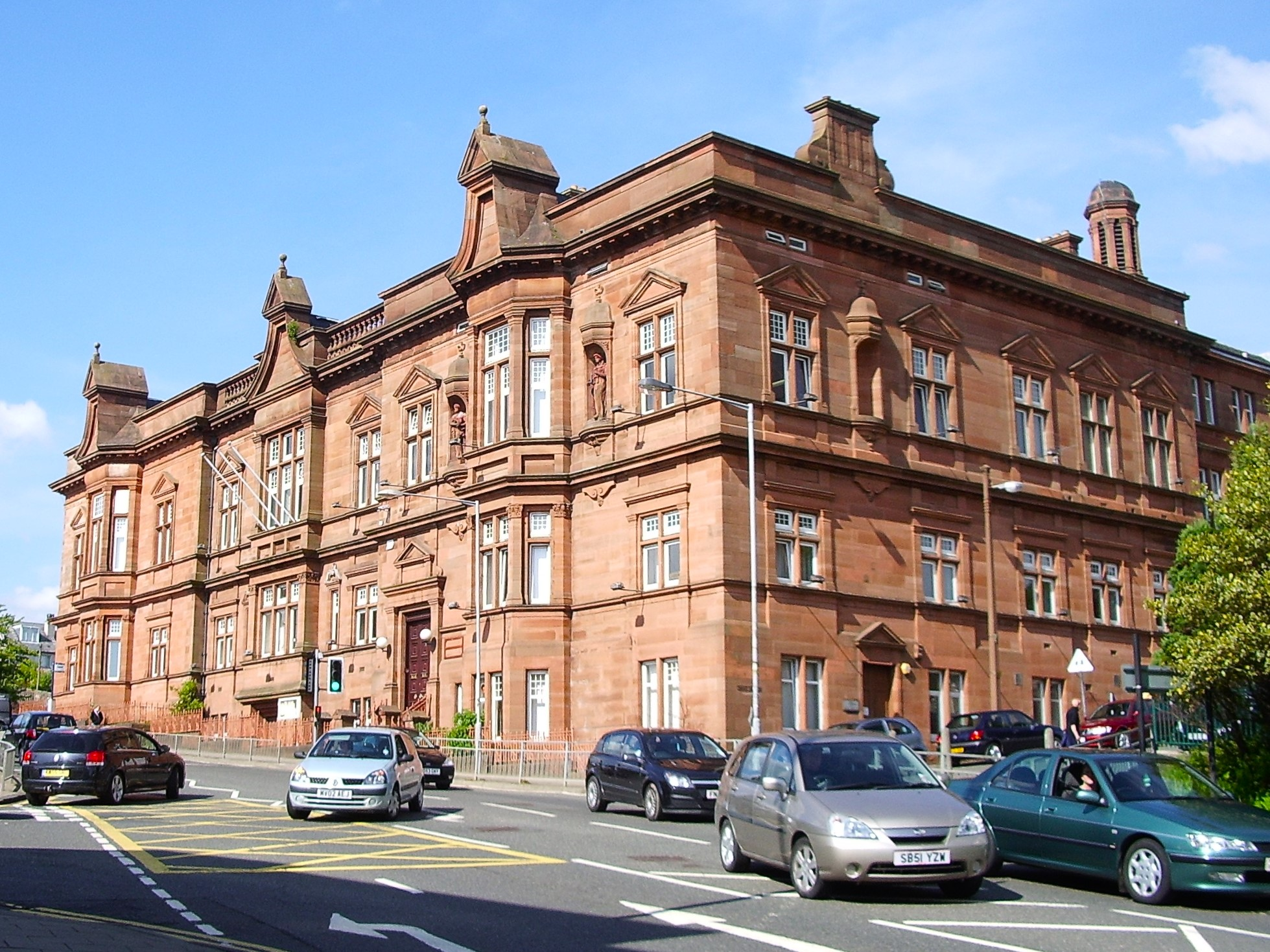
- Coatbridge Municipal Buildings

- Shown in North Lanarkshire
- 55.8637°N 4.0217°W
- Location: Dunbeth Road, Coatbridge

History
- Built: 1894

Site notes
- Architect: Alexander McGregor Mitchell
- Architectural style: Renaissance style

Listed Building – Category B
- Official name: Dunbeth Road, Municipal Buildings, Including Boundary Walls, Railings, Gatepiers And Gates
- Designated: 19 April 1993
- Reference no.: LB23016

Coatbridge Municipal Buildings, formerly Coatbridge Town Hall, is a municipal building in Dunbeth Road, Coatbridge, North Lanarkshire, Scotland. The building, which was the headquarters of Coatbridge Burgh Council, is a Category B listed building.

== History ==
Following significant population growth in the late 19th century, particularly in the iron trade, the burgh council decided to procure a town hall: the site they selected had formed part of the grounds of Dunbeth House, the residence of William Weir, a close relative of the descendants of Alexander Baird who had founded William Baird & Co Ltd, iron founders, in Gartsherrie. Weir donated the land for the town hall to the burgh council.

The new building was designed by Alexander McGregor Mitchell in the Renaissance style, built in red sandstone ashlar and completed in 1894. The design involved an asymmetrical main frontage with nine bays facing onto Dunbeth Road with the last three bays at each end slightly project forward; the left section, which was more elaborate than the other sections, originally featured a large portico with two pairs of Corinthian order columns supporting an entablature, a balustrade and two statues of lions; there was a bay window on the first floor and a pediment containing fine carvings in the tympanum. The centre section featured a tall three-light window on the first floor and a shaped gable above. The right hand section featured a doorway flanked by pilasters in the first bay and a bay window flanked by statues in niches on the second floor with a shaped gable above. The statues, which depicted Justice and Vulcan, were sculpted by James Alexander Ewing and James Charles Young respectively. Internally, the principal rooms were the council chamber and the main assembly hall, which contained an organ with four manuals and 55 stops, the latter of which had been designed and manufactured by Henry Willis & Sons.

The main assembly hall hosted many concerts by leading performers including the Bee Gees on 28 October 1967. However, the building was badly damaged in a fire later that year. The centre and right sections of the front elevation survived the fire unscathed but the more elaborate left hand section was completely destroyed: it was replaced in a sympathetic style to a design by Launcelot H. Ross & Lindsay with stonework which broadly mirrored the right hand section but without the doorway. On the Kildonan Street elevation, rather than replicating the original stonework, a modern structure was constructed with a new main entrance.

The building continued to serve as the headquarters of Coatbridge Burgh Council for much of the 20th century and, as Coatbridge Municipal Buildings, remained the local seat of government after the enlarged Monklands District Council was formed in 1975. However, it ceased that role when North Lanarkshire Council was formed, with its headquarters at Motherwell, in 1996. North Lanarkshire Council continued to use the building for workspace for various departments including education and social services. In March 2019 the council announced its intention, as part of a savings plan, to close the building and, in June 2020, it announced proposals to convert the building into 49 apartments at a cost of £11 million. Detailed design work was authorised in February 2021.

== See also ==
- List of listed buildings in Coatbridge, North Lanarkshire
