= Monklands (district) =

Scottish local government district (1975–1996), part of Strathclyde region

Coordinates: 55.829°N 3.922°W

- District
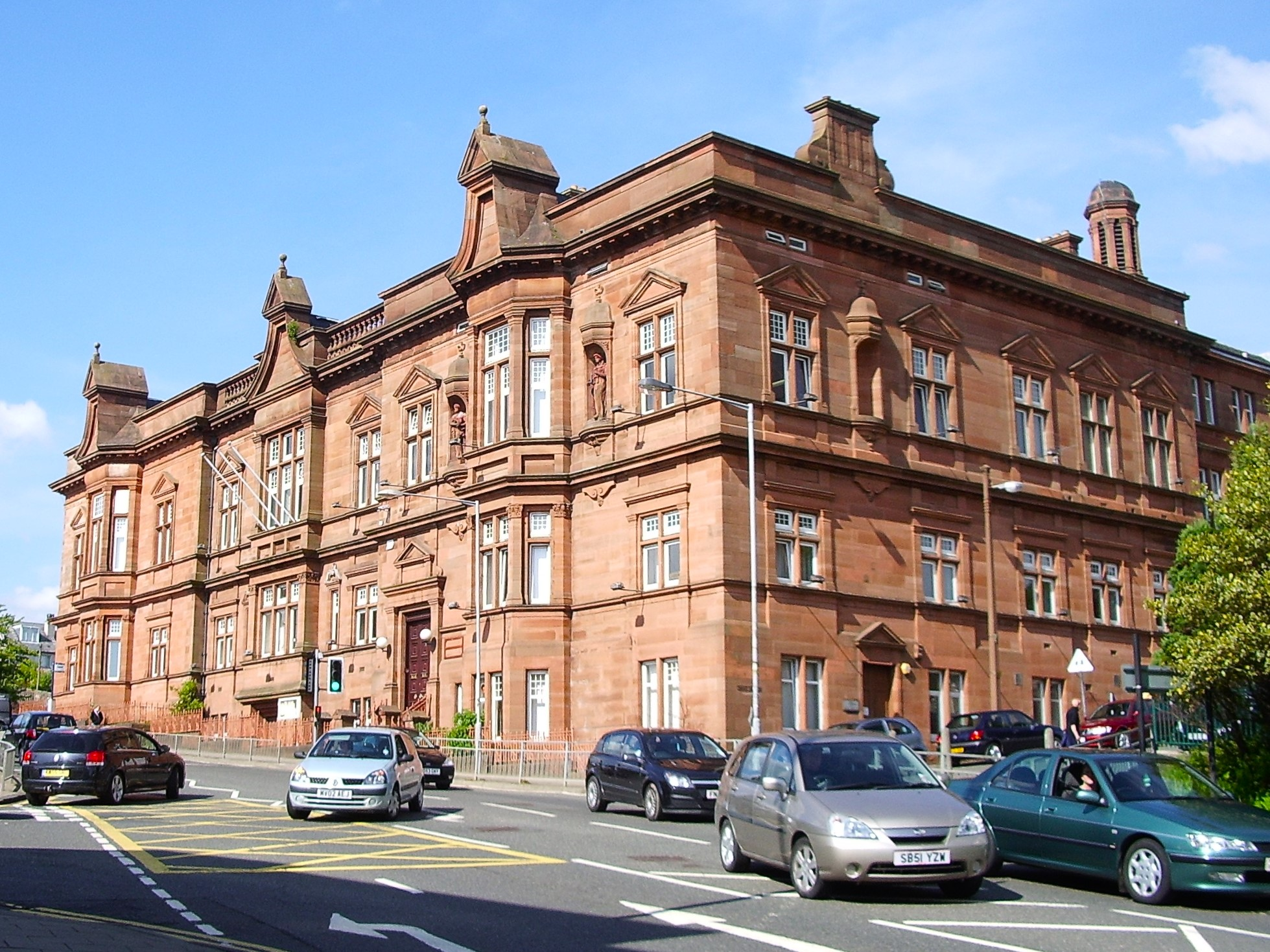
- Municipal Buildings, Dunbeth Road, Coatbridge

- Monklands district within Scotland
- Population
  - 1991: 102,379
- History
  - Created: 16 May 1975
  - Abolished: 31 March 1996
  - Succeeded by: (Part of) North Lanarkshire
- Status: District
- Government: Monklands District Council
  - HQ: Coatbridge

Monklands (Bad nam Manach in Scottish Gaelic) was, between 1975 and 1996, one of nineteen local government districts in the Strathclyde region of Scotland.

== History ==
The district was created in 1975 under the Local Government (Scotland) Act 1973, which established a two-tier structure of local government across mainland Scotland comprising upper-tier regions and lower-tier districts. Monklands was one of nineteen districts created within the region of Strathclyde. The district covered parts of four former districts from the historic county of Lanarkshire, all of which were abolished at the same time:

- Airdrie Burgh
- Coatbridge Burgh
- Seventh District (Shottskirk electoral division, rest went to Motherwell)
- Ninth District (Old Monkland and New Monkland electoral divisions, rest split between Glasgow and Strathkelvin)

The name of "Monklands" originated in the grant of lands in the area to the monks of the Cistercian Abbey of Newbattle, Midlothian in 1162. From the seventeenth century the area was formed into the two parishes of New Monkland and Old Monkland.

Apart from the two burghs of Airdrie and Coatbridge, the area included the following settlements:

- Bargeddie
- Calderbank
- Caldercruix
- Chapelhall
- Glenboig
- Glenmavis
- Greengairs
- Plains
- Salsburgh

The district was abolished in 1996 under the Local Government etc. (Scotland) Act 1994 which replaced regions and districts with unitary council areas. North Lanarkshire council area was formed covering the abolished districts of Monklands, Motherwell, Cumbernauld and Kilsyth, and the Chryston area of Strathkelvin district.

The area is still informally referred to as Monklands. The hospital in Airdrie is University Hospital Monklands (previously Monklands District General Hospital), and football matches between the two senior teams in the area, Airdrieonians and Albion Rovers, are often referred to as Monklands Derbies.

== Political control ==
The first election to the district council was held in 1974, initially operating as a shadow authority alongside the outgoing authorities until it came into its powers on 16 May 1975. Throughout the council's existence the Labour party held a majority of the seats:

Party in control	Years
Labour	1975–1996

== Premises ==
The district council's headquarters were at Coatbridge Municipal Buildings at the corner of Dunbeth Street and Kildonan Street in Coatbridge, the largest town. The building had been built in 1894 as Coatbridge Town Hall. After the council's abolition the building served as additional offices for North Lanarkshire Council, which based itself instead at Motherwell Civic Centre.

== See also ==
- 1974 Monklands District Council election
- 1988 Monklands District Council election
- 1992 Monklands District Council election
- Monklandsgate
- Subdivisions of Scotland
