= Bishop of Motherwell =

Catholic ecclesial title in Scotland

- Bishopric

catholic
- Incumbent: Bishop Joseph Toal

Location
- Ecclesiastical province: Province of Glasgow

Information
- First holder: Edward Wilson Douglas
- Established: 25 May 1947
- Diocese: Diocese of Motherwell
- Cathedral: Motherwell Cathedral

Website
- rcdom.org.uk/bishop

The Bishop of Motherwell is the ordinary of the Roman Catholic Diocese of Motherwell in the Province of Glasgow, Scotland.

The diocese covers an area of 1,178 km^{2} (500 sq mi). The see is in the town of Motherwell where the bishop's seat is located at the Cathedral Church of Our Lady of Good Aid. The Diocese of Motherwell comprises the parishes of St Benedict and St Clare, Easterhouse; Baillieston and Craigend and Garthamlock in the city of Glasgow, and the council areas of North Lanarkshire (except the parishes of Kilsyth, Condorrat, Croy and Cumbernauld and the area of Auchinloch) and South Lanarkshire.

The diocese, along with the Diocese of Paisley, was erected as a Suffragan See by the Apostolic Constitution Maxime interest on 25 May 1947. The new See took part of the Archdiocese of Glasgow (becoming its Suffragan See) and part of the Diocese of Galloway.

On Tuesday 29 April 2014 - the Feast of St Catherine of Siena Pope Francis appointed Joseph Toal, previously Bishop of Argyll and The Isles as fifth Bishop of Motherwell. Toal succeeded Joseph Devine, whose resignation was accepted by Pope Francis on 30 May 2013.

== List of bishops of Motherwell ==
Bishops of Motherwell
From	Until	Incumbent	Notes
1948	1954	Edward Wilson Douglas	Appointed bishop of Motherwell on 7 February 1948 and consecrated on 21 April 1948. Resigned on 9 February 1954 and appointed Titular Bishop of Botrys. Died on 12 June 1967.
1955	1964	James Donald Scanlan	Previously Bishop of Dunkeld (1949–1955). Appointed bishop of Motherwell on 23 May 1955. Translated to the archbishopric of Glasgow on 29 January 1964.
1964	1982	Francis A. S. W. Thomson	Appointed bishop of Motherwell on 8 December 1964 and consecrated on 24 February 1965. Resigned on 14 December 1982 and died on 6 December 1987.
1983	2013	Joseph Devine	Previously an auxiliary bishop of Glasgow (1977–1983). Appointed bishop of Motherwell on 13 May 1983. Retired on 30 May 2013.
2014	present	Joseph Toal	Appointed by Pope Francis on 29 April 2014, as the fifth Bishop of Motherwell. Installed on Monday 23 June 2014.

== See also ==
- Roman Catholicism in Scotland
