= Roman Catholic Diocese of Motherwell =

Roman Catholic diocese in Scotland

Coordinates: 55.79128°N 3.98704°W

Diocese of Motherwell Dioecesis Matrisfontis

Catholic
- Coat of arms

Location
- Country: Scotland
- Territory: Most of the council areas of North and South Lanarkshire and part of Glasgow.
- Ecclesiastical province: Ecclesiastical Province of Glasgow

Statistics
- Area: 1,178 km^{2} (455 sq mi)
- Population: Total; Catholics: (as of 2023); 648,154; 154,192 (23.8%)
- Parishes: 57
- Churches: 70
- Schools: 72 Primary Schools; 11 Secondary Schools

Information
- Denomination: Catholic
- Sui iuris church: Latin Church
- Rite: Roman Rite
- Established: 25 May 1947
- Cathedral: Cathedral Church of Our Lady of Good Aid
- Secular priests: 78, including retired priests and those working outwith the Diocese.

Current leadership
- Pope: Leo XIV
- Bishop: Joseph Toal
- Metropolitan Archbishop: William Nolan
- Vicar General: Raymond Breslin

Website
- rcdom.org.uk

The Diocese of Motherwell (Latin: Dioecesis Matrisfontis) is a Latin Church ecclesiastical territory or diocese of the Catholic Church in Scotland.

== History ==
The diocese, which was erected on 25 May 1947 by Pope Pius XII from the Archdiocese of Glasgow, along with the Diocese of Paisley which was erected on the same day, remains one of two suffragan sees under the archdiocese.

In 2004, the Catholic population, proportionately the largest in Scotland and second largest in Great Britain, was 165,100 from a total population of 633,000 (26.1%). By 2016, the number of Catholics dropped marginally to 162,331 but as the total population increased, percentagewise the Catholics dropped to 22,8 % of the total population.

In 2012 the diocese was served by 65 parish priests, 7 assistant priests and 13 deacons in across its 74 parishes (the number of parishes had reduced to 67 by March 2017). There are currently 35 retired priests from the diocese and 4 who reside in parishes in the diocese.

The area of the diocese is 1,178 square kilometres (455 sq mi).

On Tuesday 29 April 2014 – the Feast of St Catherine of Siena – Pope Francis appointed Joseph Toal as the fifth bishop of Motherwell.

== Bishops ==
=== Past and present ordinaries ===
The following is a list of the Bishops of Motherwell:

- Edward Douglas (appointed 7 February 1948 – resigned 9 February 1954)
- James Scanlan (appointed 23 May 1955 – translated to the Archdiocese of Glasgow 29 January 1964)
- Francis Thomson (appointed 8 December 1964 – resigned 14 December 1982)
- Joseph Devine (appointed 13 May 1983 - resigned Thursday 30 May 2013)
- Joseph Toal (appointed 29 April 2014 – present; previously Bishop of Argyll & the Isles Diocese from October 2008 - April 2014 and Apostolic Administrator of Motherwell from 30 May 2013 – 29 April 2014)

=== Other priests of this diocese who became bishops ===
- Thomas Joseph Winning, appointed Auxiliary Bishop of Glasgow (1971), then Archbishop of Glasgow (1974) and Cardinal (1994)
- Maurice Taylor, appointed Bishop of Galloway (1981)
- Leo William Cushley, appointed Archbishop of St Andrews and Edinburgh (2013)
- William Nolan, appointed Bishop of Galloway (2014), then Archbishop of Glasgow (2022)
- Francis Dougan, appointed Bishop of Galloway (2023)

== Diocesan clergy ==
In 2021, there were 60 parishes in the diocese served by 79 priests (including religious) and 16 deacons. Krysztof Garwolinski, parish priest of Holy Family, Mossend is chaplain to the Polish community. Johny Vettickal Abraham is chaplain to the Syro-Malabar community.

Cardinal Thomas Winning, a priest of the diocese born in Wishaw, was Archbishop of Glasgow from 1974 until his death in 2001. Maurice Taylor, a priest of the diocese was the Bishop of Galloway and served as Scotland's representative on the board of International Commission on English in the Liturgy. He was also its chairman from 1997 until 2002.

On Wednesday 24 July 2013, Leo Cushley, a priest of the diocese of Motherwell, was appointed the Archbishop of St Andrew's & Edinburgh. Cushley was ordained in 1985 by Devine in St John the Baptist Church, Uddingston before serving in the cathedral, St Serf's, Airdrie & St Aidan's, Wishaw. Since 1992 he has been a diplomat for the Vatican and held the post as head of the English-language section of the Vatican's Secretariat of State. Another priest of the diocese, William Nolan, is the current Archbishop of Glasgow and former bishop of the Diocese of Galloway. On 22 December 2023, Frank Dougan, a priest of the diocese, was appointed Bishop of Galloway. Bishops Nolan, Taylor and Dougan are all former parish priests of Our Lady of Lourdes, East Kilbride who later became Bishops of Galloway.

In 2016 Fr. John Farrell, retired priest of the Diocese of Motherwell, the last Head teacher at St Ninian's Falkland, Fife, was sentenced to five years imprisonment. His colleague Paul Kelly, a retired teacher from Portsmouth, was given ten years, both were convicted of the physical and sexual abuse of boys between the years 1979 and 1983. More than 100 charges involving 35 boys were made. Farrell and Kelly were members of the Irish Christian Brothers when the crimes were committed at the school which closed in 1983. According to The Times, it is believed this was the largest historical abuse case ever tried in Scotland, It was reported at the time of Farrell's trial that when he was released from prison steps would be taken to remove, laicise or defrock John Farrell however at this moment in time it can be neither confirmed or denied whether this has happened or not however, the Diocese of Motherwell website has his name listed as a retired Priest of the Diocese and he has not been laicised, defrocked or removed as promised after he was convicted. Under GDPR Data Protection rules it is difficult to ascertain the current situation with Farrell. The Diocese will only go as far as saying "Fr Farrell is very ill at this time" thus indicating he was not laicised by the Church.

== Parishes and deaneries ==
The 75 parishes in the diocese are divided into six deaneries. Where after the title of a church two dates are given, the first is the date of the foundation of the parish and the second is the date of the opening of the current church building. Due to a shortage of priests, a number of parishes have begun to share parish priests, forming pairs of linked parishes.

1. Airdrie Deanery - dean, Rev. Desmond Keegan
  - St Andrew – Airdrie (1950, 1954)
  - St Edward the Confessor – Airdrie (1960, 1967)
  - SS Margaret & Serf, Airdrie (parishes merged 2016)
    - St Margaret of Scotland – Airdrie (1836, 1839)
    - St Serf – Airdrie (1961, 1967)
  - Corpus Christi – Calderbank (1948, 1952)
  - St Aloysius Parish, Chapelhall (Sacred Heart, Salsburgh incorporated 2018)
    - St Aloysius – Chapelhall (1859, 1894)
    - Sacred Heart – Salsburgh (1869)
  - The Most Blessed Trinity Parish, Coatbridge (parishes merged 2018)
    - Holy Trinity & All Saints – Coatdyke (1902, 1977)
    - St Stephen – Coatbridge (1973, 1976)
  - Parish of St David, Plains & St Mary, Caldercruix (parish erected 2020)
    - St David of Scotland – Plains (1900, 1994)
    - St Dominic – Greengairs (1893)
    - St Mary – Caldercruix (1878, 1982)
2. Coatbridge & Northern Deanery - dean, Rev. Kevin McGoldrick
  - Parish of St Ambrose, Baillieston (parish erected 2016)
    - St Bridget – Baillieston (1876, 1893)
    - St Francis of Assisi – Baillieston (1970, 1973)
  - St Kevin – Bargeddie (1947, 1950)
  - St Augustine – Coatbridge (Langloan) (1892, 1899)
  - St Bartholomew – Coatbridge (Townhead) (1950, 1953)
  - Parish of St Mary & St Bernard, Coatbridge (parish erected 2019)
    - St Bernard – Coatbridge (Shawhead) (1973, 1974)
    - St Mary – Whifflet (1874, 1893)
  - St James the Greater – Coatbridge (Kirkshaws) (1956, 1961)
  - St Monica – Coatbridge (1950, 1957)
  - St Patrick – Coatbridge (1848, 1896)
  - St Dominic – Craigend (1972, 1974)
  - Parish of St John Bosco, Easterhouse (parish erected 2016)
    - St Benedict – Easterhouse (1958, 1965)
  - Our Lady & St Joseph – Glenboig (1880, 1974)
  - St Michael – Moodiesburn (1960, 2002)
  - St Barbara – Muirhead (1947, 1956)
  - St Joseph – Stepps (1875)
3. East Kilbride & Rutherglen Deanery - dean, Rev. Dominic Quinn
  - St Bride – Cambuslang (1878, 1902)
  - St Bride – East Kilbride (1946, 1964)
  - St Leonard – East Kilbride (1966, 1970)
  - Our Lady of Lourdes – East Kilbride (1958, 1963)
  - St Vincent de Paul – East Kilbride (1974, 1979)
  - St Cadoc – Halfway (1949, 1955)
  - Parish of St Anthony & St Mark, Rutherglen (parish erected 2017)
    - St Anthony – Rutherglen (1970)
    - St Mark – Rutherglen (1956, 1961)
  - St Columbkille – Rutherglen (1853, 1940)
4. Hamilton Deanery - dean, Rev. Charles O'Farrell
  - Our Lady of Fatima Parish, Blackwood & Larkhall (parish erected 2019)
    - Our Lady & St John – Blackwood (1880, 1881)
    - St Mary – Larkhall (1872, 1905)
  - Parish of St Joseph, Blantyre (united 2022)
    - St John Ogilvie – Blantyre (1977, 1979)
    - St Joseph – Blantyre (1877, 1905)
  - St Bride – Bothwell (1910, 1973)
  - Parish of SS Ninian and Cuthbert, Hamilton (merged 2018)
    - St Ninian – Hillhouse (1955, 1958)
  - Parish of SS Mary & Paul, Hamilton (parishes merged 2017)
    - St Mary – Hamilton (1846)
  - Our Lady & St Anne – Cadzow (1883, 1933)
  - St Peter – Fairhill (1953, 1981)
  - St John the Baptist – Uddingston (1883, 1987)
  - St Patrick – Strathaven (1859, 1901)
5. Motherwell & Central Deanery - dean, Rev. Brian Lamb
  - Parish of Sacred Heart & St Gerard, Bellshill (parishes united 2018)
    - Sacred Heart – Bellshill (1949, 1951)
  - St Francis Xavier – Carfin (includes National Shrine of Our Lady of Lourdes, Carfin) (1862, 1973)
  - Christ the King – Holytown (1975)
  - Holy Family – Mossend (1868, 1884)
  - The Cathedral Parish, Motherwell (parish erected 2016)
    - Cathedral of Our Lady of Good Aid, Motherwell (1873, 1900)
    - St Luke – Forgewood (1954, 1955)
  - St Bernadette – Motherwell (1950, 1964)
  - St Brendan – Motherwell (1965, 1968)
  - St Teresa of Lisieux – Newarthill (1956, 1960)
  - St John Bosco – New Stevenston (1946, 1959)
  - St Columba – Viewpark (1939)
  - St Gabriel – Viewpark (1976, 1977)
6. Wishaw Deanery - dean, Rev. Liam O'Connor
  - St Athanasius – Carluke (1849, 1857)
  - St Mary – Cleland (1874, 1877)
  - St Mary – Lanark (1859, 1910)
  - St Brigid – Newmains (1871, 1933)
  - Parish of St Patrick, Shotts (St Catherine's incorporated 2017)
    - St Patrick – Shotts (1868, 1905)
    - St Catherine of Siena – Harthill (1868, 1924)
  - St Aidan – Coltness (1960, 1966)
  - St Ignatius of Loyola – Wishaw (1859, 1865)
  - St Patrick – Craigneuk (1891, 1898)
  - St Thomas – Wishaw (1957, 1962)

There are 12 priests and 2 deacons who serve as school chaplains to the high schools in the diocese.
There are also chaplains to the main hospitals in the diocese, Monklands (Rev. Bruce McPhail and Rev. Martin Delaney), Wishaw (Rev. Moses Enehizena Cssp and Deacon Henry McKenna) and Hairmyres (Rev. Francis Dougan).

== Cathedral ==
Our Lady of Good Aid Cathedral was first built in 1900 and became the cathedral of the new diocese of Motherwell in 1948. The current Cathedral Administrator is Fr Brian Lamb. The parish of the cathedral was linked with the parish of St Luke's Motherwell in 2011.

== Cathedral Chapter ==
The cathedral chapter was erected on 8 November 1952. At present there are no canons.

Canons Emeritus

Very Rev Patrick O'Sullivan
Very Rev Humphrey O'Mahony
Rt Rev Mgr John McIntyre

== Arms ==
Coat of arms of Roman Catholic Diocese of Motherwell
Notes Granted 25 April 1990 Escutcheon Azure a fountain between three fleur-de-lys in pairle that in base reversed Argent. Motto Sectamini Caritatem

== See also ==
- Catholic Church in Scotland
