= List of Category A listed buildings in North Lanarkshire =

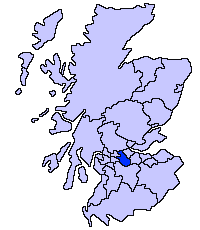
North Lanarkshire shown within Scotland

This is a list of Category A listed buildings in North Lanarkshire, Scotland.

In Scotland, the term listed building refers to a building or other structure officially designated as being of "special architectural or historic interest". Category A structures are those considered to be "buildings of national or international importance, either architectural or historic, or fine little-altered examples of some particular period, style or building type." Listing was begun by a provision in the Town and Country Planning (Scotland) Act 1947, and the current legislative basis for listing is the Planning (Listed Buildings and Conservation Areas) (Scotland) Act 1997. The authority for listing rests with Historic Scotland, an executive agency of the Scottish Government, which inherited this role from the Scottish Development Department in 1991. Once listed, severe restrictions are imposed on the modifications allowed to a building's structure or its fittings. Listed building consent must be obtained from local authorities prior to any alteration to such a structure. There are approximately 47,400 listed buildings in Scotland, of which around 8% (some 3,800) are Category A.

The council area of North Lanarkshire covers 470 square kilometres (180 sq mi), and has a population of around 325,500. There are ten Category A listed buildings within the area, ranging in age from Dalzell House, which incorporates a 15th-century tower house, to the former Cummins engine factory in Shotts, one of Scotland's youngest listed buildings, having been completed in 1983. It is listed as "one of most significant and important examples of large industrial buildings in later 20th century Britain". Other post-war buildings include two churches by the modernist architecture firm Gillespie, Kidd and Coia. Country houses are represented by William Adam's Cumbernauld House, and James Gillespie Graham's Cambusnethan House. Two urban villas in Dullatur, in the style of Alexander "Greek" Thomson, but probably by his partner Robert Turnbull, also merit Category A status.

== List ==
Name	Location	Date listed	Geo-coordinates	Notes	LB number	Image
Dunluce	Prospect Road, Dullatur		55°58′02″N 4°00′47″W	19th-century Greek revival villa	1062	Upload Photo
Woodend	Prospect Road, Dullatur		55°58′02″N 4°00′41″W	19th-century Greek revival villa	1063	Upload Photo
Bedlay Castle	Chryston		55°54′21″N 4°05′41″W	16th- or 17th-century house	4396	Upload another image See more images
Cumbernauld House	Cumbernauld		55°57′39″N 3°58′04″W	18th-century mansion by William Adam	24086	Upload another image See more images
Sacred Heart Roman Catholic Church and Presbytery	Kyle Road, Kildrum, Cumbernauld		55°57′06″N 3°58′37″W	1960s church by Gillespie, Kidd and Coia	24091	Upload another image See more images
St Patrick's Roman Catholic Church	Low Craigends, Kilsyth		55°58′32″N 4°03′13″W	1960s church by Gillespie, Kidd and Coia	36234	Upload Photo
Dalzell House	Motherwell		55°46′19″N 3°58′39″W	15th-century tower house with large later additions	38238	Upload another image See more images
Cambusnethan House	Wishaw		55°45′19″N 3°56′41″W	19th-century mansion, now ruined	47593	Upload another image See more images
St Ignatius Roman Catholic Church	Young Street, Wishaw		55°46′29″N 3°54′55″W	19th-century Gothic church	47975	Upload Photo
Centrelink 5 (Former Cummins Engine Company Ltd)	Calderhead Road, Shotts	18 November 2004	55°49′39″N 3°48′51″W	1970s factory by Ahrends, Burton & Koralek	50013	Upload another image See more images

== See also ==
- Scheduled monuments in North Lanarkshire
