= Motherwell (district) =

Former local government district in Strathclyde, Scotland

Coordinates: 55.80°N 3.93°W

- District
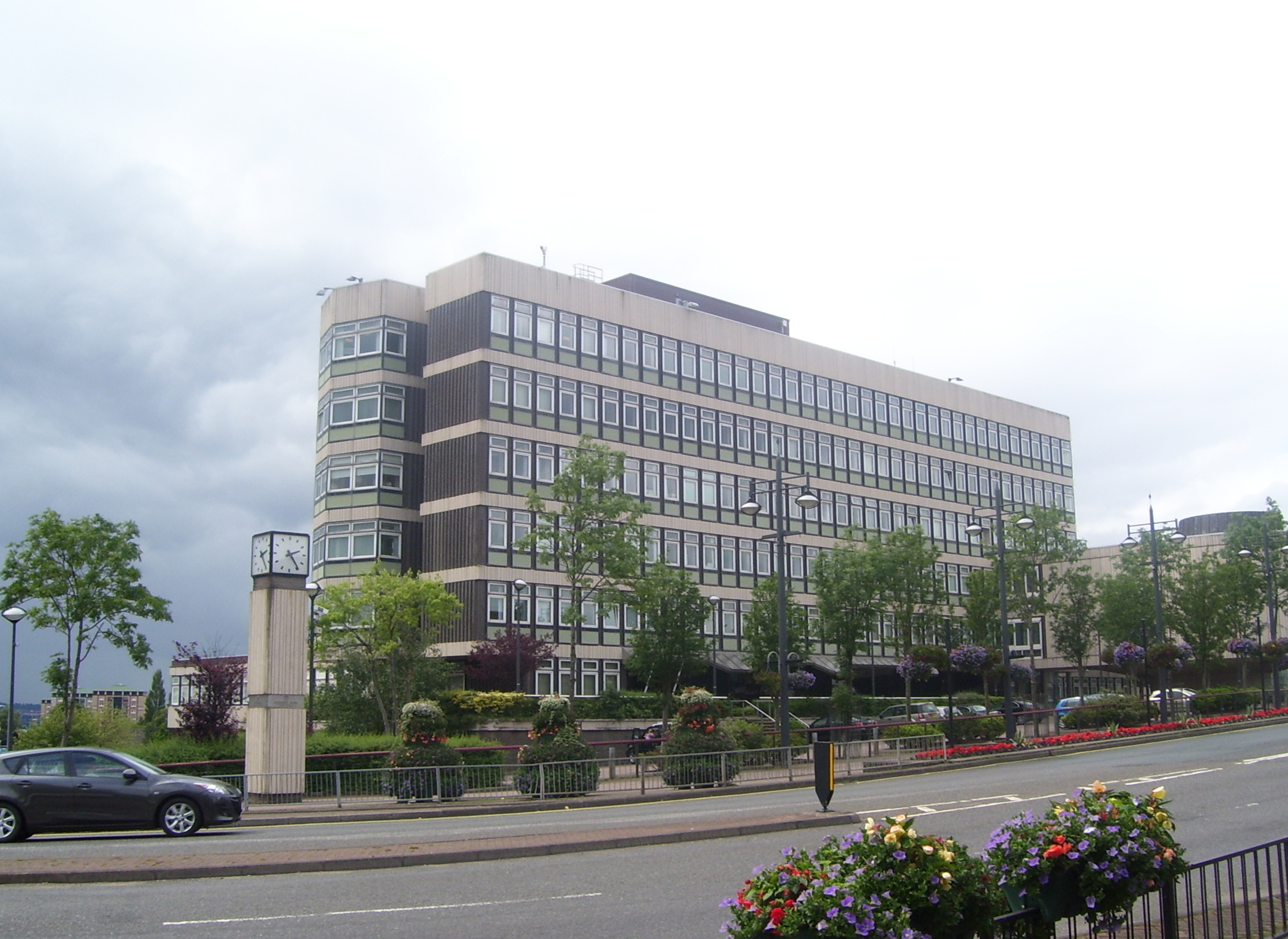
- Civic Centre, Windmillhill Street, Motherwell

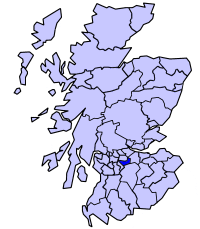
- Motherwell district within Scotland
- Population
  - 1994: 143,730
- History
  - Created: 16 May 1975
  - Abolished: 31 March 1996
  - Succeeded by: (Part of) North Lanarkshire
- Status: District
- Government: Motherwell District Council
  - HQ: Motherwell

Motherwell (Scottish Gaelic: Tobar na Màthar, Scots: Mitherwall or Murwall) was a local government district in the Strathclyde region of Scotland from 1975 to 1996, lying to the south-east of the regional capital Glasgow.

== History ==
The district was created in 1975 under the Local Government (Scotland) Act 1973, which established a two-tier structure of local government across mainland Scotland comprising upper-tier regions and lower-tier districts. Motherwell was one of nineteen districts created within the region of Strathclyde. The district covered parts of three former districts from the historic county of Lanarkshire, all of which were abolished at the same time:

- Motherwell and Wishaw Burgh
- Sixth District (except the Bothwell and Uddingston South, and Uddingston North electoral divisions, which went to Hamilton)
- Seventh District (except the Shottskirk electoral division, which went to Monklands)

The district was named after its largest town. The western boundary was the River Clyde and most of the northern boundary was the North Calder Water. As well as Motherwell itself, the district also included the settlements of Bellshill, Chapelhall, Holytown, Newarthill, Newmains and Viewpark, with a rural hinterland centred around the small town of Shotts extending east to the regional border with West Lothian. It had the eighth-largest population of the 53 Scottish districts of the era.

The district was abolished in 1996 under the Local Government etc. (Scotland) Act 1994 which replaced regions and districts with unitary council areas. North Lanarkshire council area was formed covering the abolished districts of Motherwell, Monklands, Cumbernauld and Kilsyth, and the Chryston area of Strathkelvin district.

== Political control ==
The first election to the district council was held in 1974, initially operating as a shadow authority alongside the outgoing authorities until it came into its powers on 16 May 1975. Throughout the council's existence the Labour party held a majority of the seats:

Party in control	Years
Labour	1975–1996

== Premises ==
The council was based at the Civic Centre on Windmillhill Street in Motherwell. The building was built between 1965 and 1970 for the former Motherwell and Wishaw Town Council. After the council's abolition in 1996 the building became the headquarters of North Lanarkshire Council.

== See also ==
- 1974 Motherwell District Council election
- 1988 Motherwell District Council election
- 1992 Motherwell District Council election
- Subdivisions of Scotland
