= Thomas Winning =

Archbishop of Glasgow

His Eminence Thomas Winning FRSE, FEIS
- Cardinal, Archbishop of Glasgow
- Church: Roman Catholic Church
- Archdiocese: Glasgow
- Appointed: 23 April 1974
- Term ended: 17 June 2001
- Predecessor: James Donald Scanlan
- Successor: Mario Joseph Conti
- Other post: Cardinal-priest of Sant'Andrea delle Fratte
- Previous posts: Auxiliary Bishop of Glasgow and Titular Bishop of Lugmad (1971–1974)

Orders
- Ordination: 18 December 1948 (Priest)
- Consecration: 30 November 1971 (Bishop) by James Donald Scanlan
- Created cardinal: 26 November 1994 by Pope John Paul II
- Rank: Cardinal-priest

Personal details
- Born: Thomas Joseph Winning; 3 June 1925 Wishaw, Lanarkshire, Scotland
- Died: 17 June 2001 (aged 76) Glasgow, Scotland
- Buried: Crypt of St. Andrew's Cathedral, Glasgow
- Parents: Thomas Winning and Agnes Winning (née Canning)
- Education: Our Lady's High School, Motherwell
- Motto: Caritas Christi urget nos
- Coat of arms

Thomas Joseph Winning FRSE FEIS (3 June 1925 – 17 June 2001) was a Scottish Cardinal of the Roman Catholic Church. He served as Archbishop of Glasgow from 1974 and President of the Bishops' Conference of Scotland from 1985 until his death. Winning was elevated to the cardinalate in 1994.

== Early years ==
Tom Winning was the oldest child of two born to a devout Roman Catholic family in Wishaw, Lanarkshire. His father, the son of an Irish immigrant from County Donegal, had worked as a coal-miner, served in the First World War, and was then employed in the steel industry. On losing his job, his father invested in machinery for making boiled sweets which he sold around the houses in the district as a way of bringing in money for his family. Winning attended St Patrick's Primary, Shieldmuir, Craigneuk. He served as an altar boy and chorister. Then, while at Our Lady's High School, Motherwell, he expressed the desire to become a priest.

== Priesthood ==
Winning was appointed to St Peter's Seminary, Bearsden, at age 17. He began training in Saint Mary's College, Blairs, Aberdeen, where philosophy students of St Peter's were temporarily being housed and taught and then moved to St Peter's, Bearsden. When a fire in Bearsden destroyed the seminary during renovation works, the entire college community was moved from there to St Joseph's College, Mill Hill, London. After the war ended, he was part of the first group of students to be sent to re-populate the Scots College in Rome. The college had been empty of students since 1939. He was ordained in the Church of St John Lateran, in Rome, on 18 December 1948 for the Diocese of Motherwell.

His first appointment was as an assistant (curate) at St. Aloysius, Chapelhall, Lanarkshire, but after a year he returned to Rome to study Canon Law, gaining in 1953 a Doctor of Canon Law (J.C.D.). Thereafter, he was curate in St Mary's Church in Hamilton from 1953–57 and from 1956 priest-secretary to Bishop James Donald Scanlan of Motherwell. After a period in Our Lady of Good Aid Cathedral in Motherwell from 1957–58, he became Chaplain to the Franciscan Sisters of the Immaculate Conception in Bothwell until 1961. At this point, he became Spiritual Director at the Pontifical Scots College. Soon after his arrival in Rome, the Second Vatican Council was convened and he was therefore uniquely placed to be involved with the bishops during those historic years of the various Sessions of the council. At the same time, he continued his studies becoming an advocate of the Sacred Roman Rota in 1965. In the late-1960s, after his return to Scotland, he was appointed minute secretary for the meetings of the Bishops' Conference of Scotland.

In 1966, he was called back to Scotland where he was appointed to his first charge as Parish Priest in Saint Luke's, Motherwell, where he remained until 1970 when he was appointed as the first Officialis of the newly formed Scottish National Tribunal.

== Episcopate ==
On 22 October 1971, Winning was nominated to the episcopacy, as Auxiliary Bishop to the Archbishop of Glasgow, being consecrated Titular Bishop of Lugmad on 30 November 1971 and three years later on 23 April 1974, succeeded Archbishop Scanlan when he was translated to the Metropolitan see of Glasgow. In 1975, he became the first Roman Catholic Archbishop to address the General Assembly of the Church of Scotland in the history of that Church. After his appointment to the College of Cardinals (see below), he was invited once again to address the General Assembly.

Winning was often outspoken, and unafraid to publicly expound the Roman Church's understanding of moral matters such as abortion and homosexuality (becoming a supporter of a campaign in 2000, led by businessman Brian Souter, against the repeal of Section 28) and ecclesiastical matters such as the celibacy of priests. He challenged the Act of Settlement. He also began a scheme to give financial support to young mothers, as an alternative to abortion. He rejected a plan to renovate and extend St Andrew's Cathedral, as the money would be better spent on the poor of the Archdiocese. He played a major role in bringing Pope John Paul II to the UK in 1982, a visit that was almost called off because of the Falklands Conflict that coincided with the scheduled visit. Winning is thought to have convinced the Pope to continue with the visit which was the first official visit to the United Kingdom by any Pope.

== Cardinalate ==
On 26 November 1994, he was elevated to the College of Cardinals by Pope John Paul II and appointed cardinal-priest of Sant'Andrea delle Fratte. Winning was only the second cardinal since the Reformation to be based in Scotland. He was awarded honorary degrees from the universities of Aberdeen (LL.D. 1996), Glasgow (DD, 1983) and Strathclyde (D. Univ, 1992); Glasgow University made him an honorary Professor in the Faculty of Divinity in 1996. He was appointed by Pope John Paul II to the Pontifical Council for the Promotion of Christian Unity and to the Pontifical Council for the Family, November 1994 until his death.

== Death ==
Thomas Winning died in office in June 2001, following a heart attack and is interred in the crypt of St Andrew's Cathedral, Glasgow. His successor as Archbishop of Glasgow was Mario Conti.

In June 2011, two separate schools in Glasgow combined into one new school located in Tollcross which they voted to call Cardinal Winning after the late Archbishop of Glasgow. The new Cardinal Winning Secondary opened on Tuesday, 21 June 2011 and contains pupils from St Joan of Arc and St Aidan's, two schools located in Glasgow.

Catholic Church titles
Preceded by Michael O'Reilly	— TITULAR — Bishop of Lugmad; 1971–1974	Succeeded by John Joseph Gerry
Preceded by James Donald Scanlan	Archbishop of Glasgow; 1974–2001	Succeeded by Mario Joseph Conti
Preceded by Joseph Cordeiro	Cardinal Priest of Sant'Andrea delle Fratte; 1994–2001	Succeeded by Ennio Antonelli
