= Motherwell Cathedral =

- Cathedral Church of Our Lady of Good Aid
- Motherwell Cathedral in 2017

- Shown within North Lanarkshire
- 55.79128°N 3.98704°W
- Location: Motherwell, Lanarkshire
- Country: Scotland
- Denomination: Roman Catholic
- Website: motherwell-cathedral.org.uk

History
- Dedication: 9 December 1900

Architecture
- Architect(s): Pugin & Pugin
- Style: Gothic Revival
- Years built: 1899–1900

Specifications
- Capacity: 1000 Seated

Administration
- Province: Glasgow
- Diocese: Motherwell

Clergy
- Bishop: Rt Rev Joseph Toal
- Dean: Rev Brian Lamb

The Cathedral Church of Our Lady of Good Aid, popularly known as Motherwell Cathedral, is a Roman Catholic cathedral located in the town of Motherwell in North Lanarkshire, Scotland. It is the seat of the Bishop of Motherwell and the mother church of the Diocese of Motherwell.

== History ==
The Church of Our Lady of Good Aid, Motherwell, was opened on Monday 9 December 1900. In 1948 the church was elevated to the status of cathedral after the new Motherwell Diocese was erected as a suffragan see by the apostolic constitution Maxime interest. The Scottish Catholic Directory of 1901 includes in the list of events for the year 1899-1900 the "Opening of the Church of Our Lady of Good Aid, Motherwell" on Monday 9 December 1900, the feast of the Immaculate Conception transferred from Sunday. It includes a description of the church's dimensions and principal architectural features.

== Music ==
Motherwell Cathedral's organ was renovated in 2008, and is noted for its size. It was electronically modified with a new console installed. With four manuals it is the largest organ of any Roman Catholic church in the West of Scotland. The cathedral organist is John Pitcathely, who played the organ at both of the Papal visits to Scotland. The Motherwell Diocesan Choir sings at many of the major services in the cathedral and also sings at the 5.30 pm vigil Mass on Saturdays. The Motherwell Diocesan Choir, which is distinct from the Cathedral Choir, is directed by John Pitcathely.

== Architecture ==
The cathedral was designed in the Gothic revival style by the celebrated architects Pugin & Pugin and resembles many Catholic churches designed by them in Scotland, England and Ireland. The church originally had a high altar and two side altars. However, these and much of the ornate decorations were lost in the re-ordering of the sanctuary in 1984 in the spirit of the reforms of the Second Vatican Council.

== Services ==
Saturday vigil, 5.30pm

Sunday 10.30am, 6.30pm

Monday – Saturday, 10.00am; also Thursday 7.00 pm

== Clergy ==
List of parish priests of the Parish Church of Our Lady of Good Aid

- Rev. James Gilmour, 1875–77
- Rev. James Glancey D.D, 1877–88
- Very Rev. John Canon Taylor, 1888–1917
- Rt. Rev. Mgr. Thomas Canon Currie, 1917–35
- Rev. Bartholomew Atkinson, 1935–46
- Very Rev. Denis Canon Flynn, 1947–56

List of deans of the Cathedral Church of Our Lady of Good Aid (Motherwell Cathedral)

- Rt. Rev. Mgr. Gerard M. Rogers, 1956–60
- Rt. Rev. Mgr. John Conroy, 1960–81
- Very Rev. Noel Canon Carey, 1981–2011
- Rt. Rev. Mgr. Thomas Canon Millar V.G, 2011–17
- Rev. Gerard Chromy V.G, 2017–22
- Rev. Brian Lamb, 2022–present

The dean of the cathedral has also served as parish priest of St Luke's Church in Motherwell since the parishes were amalgamated in 2016.

== See also ==
- List of cathedrals in the United Kingdom
