= Joseph Toal =

20th and 21st-century Scottish Catholic bishop

The Right Reverend Joseph Anthony Toal
- Bishop of Motherwell
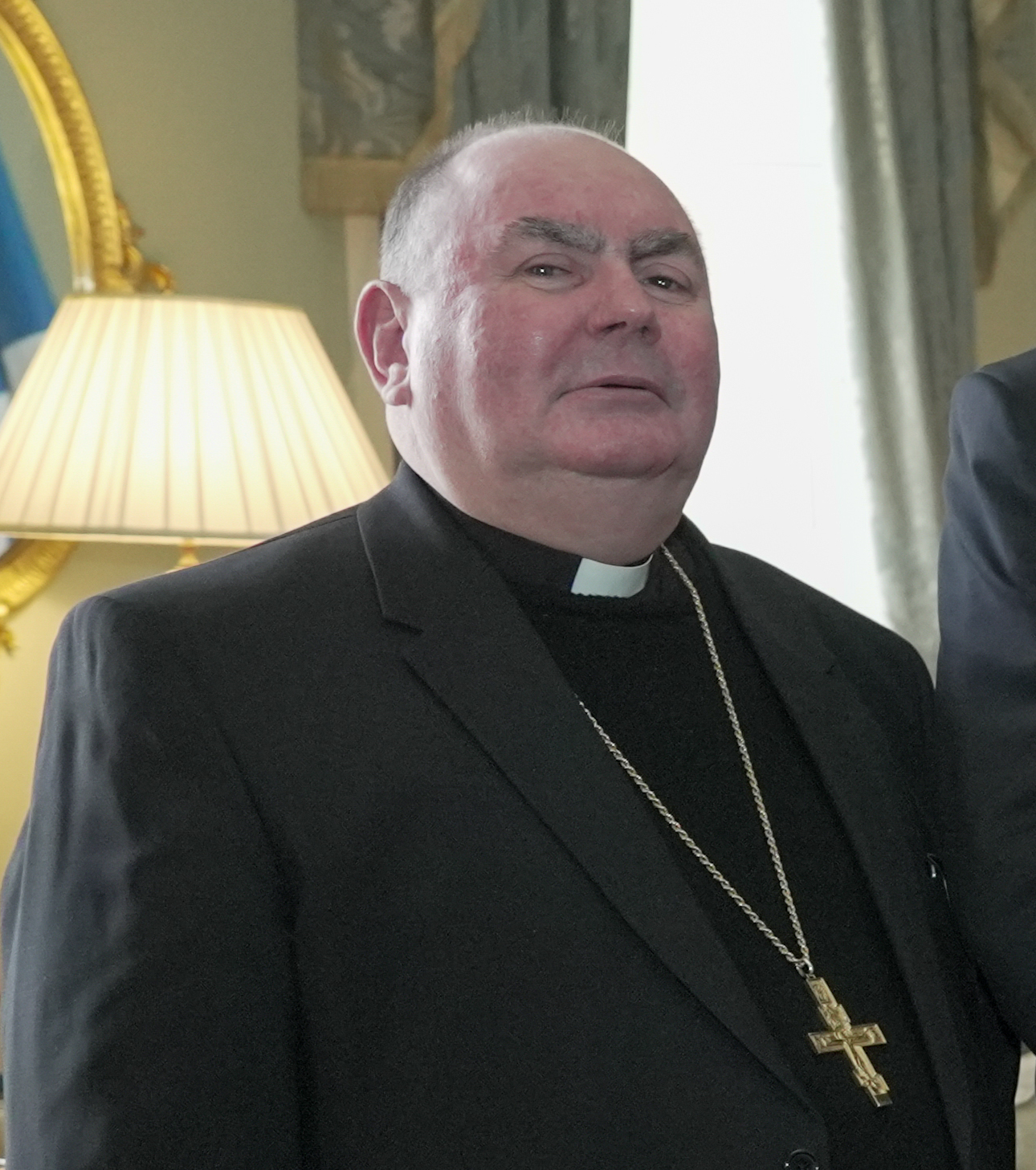
- Bishop Toal in 2024
- Church: Roman Catholic Church
- Diocese: Motherwell
- Appointed: 29 April 2014
- Installed: 23 June 2014
- Predecessor: Joseph Devine
- Previous post: Bishop of Argyll & the Isles (2008–2014)

Orders
- Ordination: 10 July 1980 by Colin MacPherson
- Consecration: 8 December 2008 by Keith O'Brien

Personal details
- Born: 13 October 1956 (age 69) Roybridge, Scotland, UK
- Denomination: Roman Catholicism
- Education: St Mary's College, Blairs
- Alma mater: Royal Scots College, Valladolid
- Motto: Latin: Humiliter ambulare cum Deo
- Coat of arms

Joseph Anthony Toal (born 13 October 1956) is a Scottish Roman Catholic bishop. On 29 April 2014 he was named by Pope Francis as the fifth Bishop of Motherwell, having served as Bishop of Argyll and the Isles since 2008.

== Biography ==
Born in Roy Bridge, Inverness-shire, Scotland on 13 October 1956. Educated locally at Roy Bridge Primary School he proceeded to train for the priesthood at St Vincent's College, Langbank, St Mary's College, Blairs and the Royal Scots College in Valladolid, Spain.

He was ordained a priest of the Roman Catholic Diocese of Argyll and the Isles at St Columba's Cathedral in Oban on 10 July 1980.

After ordination Toal served in Daliburgh and Ardkenneth on South Uist, Campbeltown and Benbecula before being appointed spiritual director at the Royal Scots College in Salamanca, Spain, in 1999. He was then vice rector before becoming rector of the College.

Toal was appointed bishop of the Diocese of Argyll and the Isles by the Holy See on 16 October 2008 and consecrated to the episcopate on 8 December 2008. The principal consecrator was Keith Cardinal O'Brien, Archbishop of St Andrews & Edinburgh. The principal co-consecrators were Archbishop Faustino Sainz Muñoz, Apostolic Nuncio to Great Britain and Bishop Ian Murray, Bishop Emeritus of Argyll & the Isles.

Toal has been given the names of complainants who allege Keith Cardinal O'Brien committed predatory sex against them. Toal stated to The Observer newspaper, "It's been hard listening to what's being said, but it's important we hear what they're saying and the gravity of the situation. If I can help in some way, I will."

On 29 April 2014, Toal was appointed by Pope Francis as the fifth Bishop of Motherwell. He was installed on Monday 23 June 2014 in Our Lady of Good Aid Cathedral, Motherwell.

== Controversy ==
Matthew Despard complained about what he called a culture of homosexual bullying within the Catholic Church and alleged that higher-ranking clergy ignored or facilitated abuse. Toal arranged for letters to be given to Despard's parishioners strongly critical of Despard and later suspended him. Toal condemned Despard for questioning his authority. The overwhelming majority of parishioners walked out during a Mass which Toal held in Despard's former church. Parishioner, Geraldine Penches who was loudly applauded by others in the congregation described Matthew Despard as, "a very honest man" adding, "This is more scandal to rock the Catholic church which has to be hushed up. Because Father tells the truth he is removed from his priestly duties. We the people are the church, not the bishops." There are complaints that Despard was disciplined without being represented and a petition calling for his reinstatement got over 1,000 signatures.

Toal maintained the accusations Despard made were false and defamatory.

Catholic Church titles
Preceded by Ian Murray	Bishop of Argyll & the Isles; 2008 to 2014	Succeeded by Brian McGee
Preceded by Joseph Devine	Bishop of Motherwell; 2014 to present	Incumbent
