= Roderick Wright (bishop) =

Bishop of Argyll and the Islands

The Right Reverend Roderick Wright
- Bishop of Argyll and the Isles
- Province: St Andrews and Edinburgh
- Diocese: Argyll and the Isles
- Appointed: 11 December 1990
- Term ended: 19 September 1996
- Predecessor: Colin MacPherson
- Successor: Ian Murray

Orders
- Ordination: 29 June 1964 (Priest)
- Consecration: 15 January 1991 (Bishop) by Luigi Barbarito

Personal details
- Born: 28 June 1940 Glasgow, Scotland
- Died: 23 May 2005 (aged 64) Napier
- Denomination: Roman Catholic
- Spouse: Kathleen (m. June 1998)
- Children: One son

Roderick Wright (28 June 1940 – 23 May 2005) was a Scottish Roman Catholic bishop who served as the Bishop of Argyll and the Isles from 1990 to 1996.

== Early life ==
Born in the Kingston district of Glasgow on 28 June 1940, Wright was one of four children of a working-class merchant seaman. His parents were Andrew 'Andra' Wright and Dolina 'Dolly' MacInnes, who both came from the Outer Hebrides: Andrew came from Eriskay, and Dolina came from South Boisdale, South Uist. Roddy Wright, as he was known to family and friends, was educated at St Gerard's Secondary School in Govan. He began training for the priesthood at Blairs College in Kincardineshire when he was fourteen, and went on to St Peter's Seminary, Cardross in 1958.

== Ministry ==
Priesthood

After Wright was ordained a priest on 29 June 1964, his first pastoral appointments were at St Laurence's Church, Drumchapel, Glasgow (1964–1966), and St Jude's Church, Barlanark, Glasgow (1966–1969). He returned to Blairs College as spiritual director (1969–1974). His next appointment was as an assistant priest at Our Lady and St Mun's Dunoon, Argyll (1974–1976). For a short while, he acted as a chaplain to the United States Navy base at Holy Loch. His last three appointments before his episcopal ordination were as priest at St Mary's Church, Fort William (1976–1980); St Michael's Church, Ardkenneth, South Uist (1980–1986); and St Anne's Church, Corpach, near Fort William (1986–1991).

Episcopate

Wright was appointed the bishop of the Diocese of Argyll and the Isles by the Holy See on 11 December 1990 and consecrated at St. Columba's Cathedral in Oban on 15 January 1991. The principal consecrator was Luigi Barbarito, Titular Archbishop of Fiorentino, Apostolic Pro-Nuncio to Great Britain. The principal co-consecrators were Cardinal Thomas Winning, Archbishop of Glasgow, and Keith O'Brien, Archbishop of St. Andrews and Edinburgh.

== Resignation and marriage ==
Wright disappeared from his home next door to St. Columba's Cathedral, Oban, on 4 September 1996. Kathleen MacPhee, a divorced mother of three who worked as a nurse in Fort William, vanished at the same time leaving her youngest child with relatives. There was concern among local people, including Frances Shand Kydd, the mother of Diana, Princess of Wales. Wright had advised Shand-Kydd before her reception into the Roman Catholic Church in 1994. The following weekend, a former parishioner of Wright's came forward to say that she had become pregnant by him and given birth to a son in 1981.

Wright resigned as Bishop of Argyll and the Isles on 19 September 1996 and renounced the office of bishop.

Wright registered as unemployed and was spotted looking for work in the Jobcentre in Kendal, Cumbria, England. In his autobiography, he alleged that Jobcentre staff had leaked information about him. Wright married MacPhee in a civil ceremony in Antigua in June 1998.

== Later life and death ==
In 2002, Wright and his wife emigrated to New Zealand. He suffered in his last months from liver cancer and died on 23 May 2005, aged 64.

Catholic Church titles
Preceded by Colin MacPherson	Bishop of Argyll and the Isles; 1990–1996	Succeeded by Ian Murray
