= St Ninian's High School, Kirkintilloch =

School in East Dunbartonshire, Scotland

St Ninian's High School

Location
- Bellfield Road; Kirkintilloch, East Dunbartonshire, G66 1DT; Scotland
- Coordinates: 55°56′17″N 4°09′45″W

Information
- Type: Comprehensive
- Motto: In necessariis unitas, in dubiis libertas, in omnibus caritas (unity in necessary things; liberty in doubtful things; charity in all things)
- Religious affiliation: Roman Catholic
- Established: 1874
- Local authority: East Dunbartonshire
- Headteacher: David Killin
- Deputies: Garry Mulgrew (S1/S3); Suzanne Boyle (S2); David Sheeran (S6); Steven Rance (S4/S5)
- Gender: Coeducational
- Age: 11 to 18
- Enrolment: 829
- Houses: St. Andrews; St. Mungo; St. John Paul; St. Margaret Of Scotland; St. John Ogilvie; St. Teresa Of Calcutta
Colours
tie colours
crest colours
- Website: http://www.st-ninians.e-dunbarton.sch.uk

St. Ninian's High School is a Roman Catholic co-educational comprehensive secondary school, located in Kirkintilloch, East Dunbartonshire, on the banks of the Forth and Clyde Canal.

== Admissions ==
There are currently over 900 students in attendance with an average of 5/6 classes in each year. Each class has no more than 30 pupils. St Ninians is a Roman Catholic School.

== School roll ==
School year	S1	S2	S3	S4	S5	S6	Total Roll	References
2000/2001							740	
2001/2002							713	
2002/2003	142	119	157	117	104	85	724	
2003/2004								
2004/2005							764	
2005/2006								
2006/2007	141	135	147	159	108	58	748	
2007/2008	145	141	139	142	132	61	760	
2008/2009	135	145	140	135	108	86	749	
2009/2010	116	137	154	140	127	83	757	
2010/2011							779	
2011/2012	107	136	126	151	126	105	751	
2012/2013	128	113	148	131	142	97	759	
2013/2014	125	136	120	143	111	108	743	
2014/2015	128	133	137	121	126	89	734	
2015/2016	136	126	138	135	118	107	760	
2016/2017	142	140	126	136	117	89	750	
2017/2018	176	150	144	126	116	88	800	

== Academic performance ==
The school has consistently proved to be successful in a number of different areas – SQA results, the Charter Mark award, Investors in People recognition and the Scottish Education Award for “Raising Basic Standards”. In 2008, David Miller, an English Teacher, won the UK Secondary Teacher of the Year at the National Teaching Awards, and, in 2009, Headteacher Paul McLaughlin won the Scottish Secondary Head Teacher of the Year.

== History ==
St Ninian's opened in 1874 in the town centre on Union Street. The school then moved to a new site in 1931 on the sight of the former Westermains House on Bellfield Road. It then moved from Bellfield Road to the former Thomas Muir campus in Bishopbriggs during the demolition and complete rebuild of the Bellfield Road Campus. As of August 2009, is back in Bellfield Road.

== Celtic Youth Academy ==
St Ninian's High, in partnership with Celtic F.C., allows the Celtic Academy players, who are pupils in S1 to S5, to combine intensive coaching sessions with a programme of studies based on continental methods, where everything is monitored including behaviour and homework.

== Feeder schools ==
- Holy Family Primary School, Lenzie.
- Holy Trinity Primary School, Kirkintilloch.
- St Nicholas' Primary School, Bearsden.
- St Machan's Primary School, Lennoxtown.

== Notable former pupils ==
- Theresa Breslin (born 1947), author
- Peter Capaldi (born 1958), actor
- Stephen Crainey (born 1981), footballer
- Karamoko Dembélé (born 2003), footballer
- Joseph Devine (1937 – 2019), Bishop of Motherwell
- Joe Docherty, Baron Docherty of Milngavie (born 1969), Labour peer
- John Hendrie (born 1963), footballer
- Aaron Hickey (born 2002), footballer
- Des McKeown (born 1970), footballer
- Charlie Mulgrew (born 1986), footballer
- Bishop Ian Murray (born 1932), Bishop Emeritus of the Roman Catholic Diocese of Argyll and the Isles
- Katie Sutherland, musician (Pearl and the Puppets)
- Kieran Tierney (born 1997), footballer
- Paul Wilson (born 1950), footballer
