= Jesús Agustín López de Lama =

Spanish priest (1929–2023)

His Excellency Jesús Agustín López de Lama
- Prelate Emeritus of Corocoro
- Appointed: 10 June 1966
- Term ended: 5 September 1991
- Predecessor: Ubaldo Evaristo Cibrián Fernández
- Successor: Toribio Sergio Porco Ticona
- Other post: Titular Bishop of Casae Calanae (1966–1977)

Orders
- Ordination: 14 March 1954
- Consecration: 4 September 1966 by Carmine Rocco

Personal details
- Born: 25 December 1929 Cedillo de la Torre, Spain
- Died: 8 February 2023 (aged 93) Bilbao, Spain

Jesús Agustín López de Lama (25 December 1929 – 8 February 2023) was a Spanish Roman Catholic prelate.

López de Lama was born in Spain and was ordained to the priesthood in 1954. He was appointed prefect of the Roman Catholic Territorial Prelature of Corocoro, Bolivia in 1966 and was ordained titular bishop of Casae Calanae. He resigned in 1991.

López de Lama died in Bilbao on 8 February 2023, at the age of 93.

Catholic Church titles
Preceded by Ubaldo Evaristo Cibrián Fernández	Prelate of Corocoro; 1966–1991	Succeeded by Toribio Sergio Porco Ticona
Preceded by Post created	Titular Bishop of Casae Calanae; 1966–1977	Succeeded by Luis Reynoso Cervantes
