= Donald Martin (bishop) =

The Right Reverend Donald Martin
- Bishop of Argyll and the Isles
- Church: Roman Catholic Church
- Diocese: Argyll and the Isles
- Appointed: 2 April 1919
- Term ended: 6 December 1938
- Predecessor: George Smith
- Successor: Donald Campbell

Orders
- Ordination: 23 September 1905 by George Smith
- Consecration: 11 June 1919 by John Toner

Personal details
- Born: 6 October 1873 Salen, Argyll, Scotland
- Died: 6 December 1938 (aged 65) Oban, Argyll, Scotland
- Buried: Pennyfuir Cemetery, Oban
- Education: Royal Scots College, Valladolid

Donald Martin (6 October 1873 – 6 December 1938) was a Scottish Roman Catholic clergyman who served as the Bishop of Argyll and the Isles from 1919 to 1938.

== Biography ==
Born in Salen on the Ardnamurchan peninsula, Scotland on 6 October 1873. He studied at the Royal Scots College, Valladolid from 1899 to 1905 where his uncle, David McDonald, was rector. He was ordained to the priesthood on 23 September 1905. He served as parish priest in Castlebay 1906–08, curate in Glencoe 1908–09 and parish priest of Oban 1909–19.

He was appointed the Bishop of the Diocese of Argyll and the Isles by the Holy See on 2 April 1919, and consecrated to the Episcopate on 11 June 1919 at Oban. The principal consecrator was John Toner, Bishop of Dunkeld, and the principal co-consecrators were James William McCarthy, Bishop of Galloway and Henry Gray Graham, Auxiliary Bishop of St Andrews and Edinburgh.

Bishop Martin made it his task to provide a worthy cathedral for his diocese, and undertook two trips to the United States to raise funds. Work finally began in 1932 and it was opened albeit partially completed two years later.

He died in office on 6 December 1938, aged 65.

Catholic Church titles
| Preceded by George John Smith | Bishop of Argyll and the Isles; 1919–1938 | Succeeded by Donald Alphonsus Campbell |
