= Ian Murray (bishop) =

The Right Reverend Ian Murray
- Bishop Emeritus of Argyll and the Isles
- Church: Roman Catholic Church
- Diocese: Argyll and the Isles
- Appointed: 3 November 1999
- Term ended: 16 October 2008
- Predecessor: Roderick Wright
- Successor: Joseph Toal

Orders
- Ordination: 17 March 1956
- Consecration: 7 December 1999 by Keith O'Brien

Personal details
- Born: 15 December 1932 Lennoxtown, Stirlingshire, Scotland
- Died: 22 January 2016 (aged 83) Edinburgh, Midlothian, Scotland
- Parents: John Murray and Margaret (née Rodgers)
- Motto: Obedience gives strength

Bishop Ian Murray (15 December 1932 – 22 January 2016), was a Scottish divine, the ninth Bishop of Argyll & the Isles after the restoration of the hierarchy.

== Early life ==
Ian Murray was born in Lennoxtown, Stirlingshire, as the eldest of the four children of John Murray and Margaret Rodgers. He was educated at St Machan's Primary School in Lennoxtown, St Ninian's High School in Kirkintilloch and the National Junior Seminary at St Mary's College in Blairs, Aberdeen.

His great uncle Paddy Murray was a footballer who played for Hibernian and Scotland.

== Priesthood ==
After Blairs, he completed his ecclesiastical studies at the Royal Scots College (el Real Colegio de los Escoceses), Valladolid. He was ordained to the Priesthood for the Archdiocese of St Andrews & Edinburgh in the college chapel on 17 March 1956 by Bishop Joseph McGee.

After ordination, Father Murray served at St Mary's Metropolitan Cathedral, Edinburgh, St Kenneth's, Lochore and St Columba's, Edinburgh. Thereafter he returned to Valladolid as Vice-Rector until 1970. On returning to Scotland he was appointed as the Catholic chaplain to the University of Stirling where he remained until 1977. He then served at Our Lady & St Bride's, Cowdenbeath and subsequently at St Ninian's, Restalrig.

In 1987 Father Murray was appointed Rector of the Royal Scots College in Valladolid. He assisted with the transfer of the College to Salamanca in 1988 and remained there until his return to Scotland in 1994. On recommencing his work in the Archdiocese he served in Galashiels, Falkirk and was appointed Vicar General of the Archdiocese of St Andrews & Edinburgh.

== Episcopate ==
In 1999, Monsignor Ian Murray was nominated ninth Bishop of Argyll & the Isles by Pope John Paul II. He was consecrated by Archbishop Keith Michael Patrick O'Brien on 7 December that year, the feast of St Ambrose, a patron of the Royal Scots College.

On 15 December 2008, reaching 75 years of age, in accordance with Canon Law, Bishop Murray submitted his resignation to Pope Benedict XVI, who appointed the Very Reverend Monsignor Joseph Anthony Toal, the Rector of the Royal Scots College, to succeed him as tenth Bishop of Argyll & the Isles. In retirement Bishop Murray lived at St Columba's, Newington, St Mary's Metropolitan Cathedral, Edinburgh and then, until his death in January 2016, with the Little Sisters of the Poor at St Joseph's House, Gilmore Place, Edinburgh.

Following his demise, Requiem Mass was offered for Bishop Murray in the presence of the Metropolitan of St Andrews & Edinburgh and the hierarchy of Scotland at St Columba's Cathedral, Oban on Friday 5 February 2016. On the same day he was buried at Pennyfuir Cemetery alongside his predecessors.

Bishop Murray's motto "Obedience gives strength" was taken from the writings of St Teresa of Avila who once wrote, “When I was in Salamanca in 1571 the Lord said to me, 'Daughter, obedience gives strength'”.

Catholic Church titles
| Preceded by Roderick Wright | Bishop of Argyll and the Isles; 1999–2008 | Succeeded by Joseph Anthony Toal |
