= Mariastern Abbey =

Mariastern Abbey may refer to:

- Mariastern Abbey, Banja Luka, Trappist abbey in Bosnia and Herzegovina.
- Mariastern Abbey, Hohenweiler, Cistercian nunnery in Austria.
