= Brian McGee (bishop) =

Bishop of the Roman Catholic Church (born 1965)

The Right Reverend Brian McGee
- Bishop of Argyll & the Isles
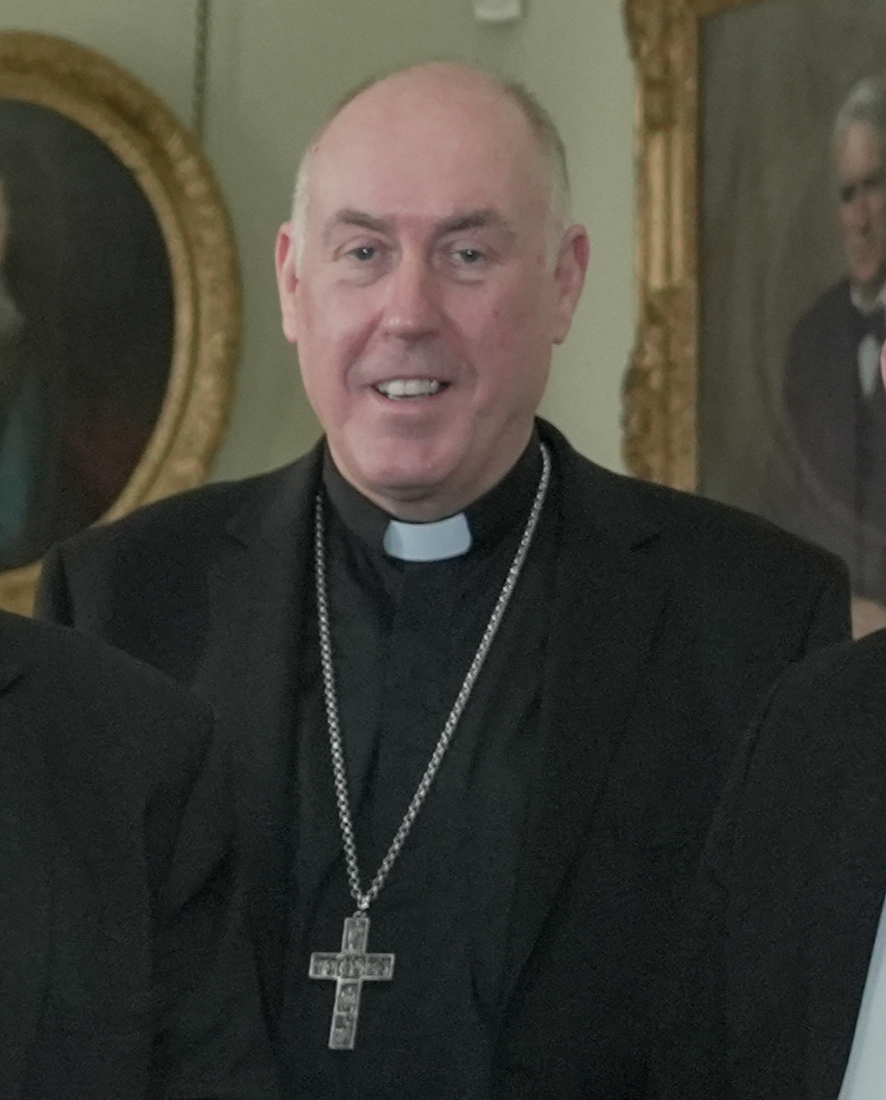
- McGee in 2024
- Diocese: Argyll & the Isles
- Appointed: 28 December 2015
- Installed: 16 February 2016
- Predecessor: Joseph Toal

Orders
- Ordination: 29 June 1989 by John Mone
- Consecration: 16 February 2016 by Leo Cushley

Personal details
- Born: Brian McGee; 8 October 1965 (age 61) Greenock, Inverclyde, Scotland
- Denomination: Roman Catholic
- Parents: Seamus and Brighid McGee
- Education: St Patrick's College, Thurles; Sarum College, Salisbury

Styles of Brian McGee
- Reference style: The Right Reverend
- Spoken style: Your Lordship
- Religious style: Bishop

Brian McGee (born 8 October 1965, Greenock, Scotland) is the 11th Bishop of the Roman Catholic Diocese of Argyll and the Isles in Scotland.

== Early life ==
McGee was born in Greenock to Irish parents Seamus and Brighid McGee, who moved to Scotland after their marriage in 1964. He attended St Joseph's Primary School and Holy Cross Primary School, both in Greenock. After primary education he continued his studies at St. Vincent's College, Langbank, and St. Mary's College, Blairs, a minor seminary.

== Formation and further studies ==
McGee studied for the priesthood at St. Patrick's College, Thurles (in County Tipperary, Ireland) between 1983 and 1989, where he received a Certificate in Philosophy (Distinction) validated by the Irish Governments National Council for Educational Awards and a Diploma in Theology (Distinction), accredited by Maynooth Pontifical University. In 2011 he completed a Master of Arts degree in Christian Spirituality (Distinction) from Sarum College, Salisbury.

== Priesthood ==
McGee was ordained in 1989 as a priest for the Diocese of Paisley by Bishop John Mone.

He subsequently held the following pastoral appointments:

- Assistant Priest, St Charles Borromeo Parish, Paisley 1989–1995
- Assistant Priest, Holy Family Parish, Port Glasgow 1995–1997
- Parish Priest, St Joseph's Parish, Clarkston 1997–2007
- Spiritual Director, Scotus College, National Seminary 2007–2009
- Parish Priest, Holy Family Parish, Port Glasgow 2009–2015

In 2014 he was appointed vicar general of the Diocese of Paisley.

== Episcopal career ==
He was appointed by Pope Francis on 28 December 2015 and consecrated by Archbishop Leo Cushley on 18 February 2016 in St Columba's Cathedral, Oban. Bishops Joseph Toal of Motherwell, McGee's immediate predecessor, and John Keenan, bishop of his native diocese of Paisley, served as co-consecrators.

Catholic Church titles
Preceded by Joseph Toal	Bishop of Argyll and the Isles; 2015 - present	Incumbent
