= Royal Scots College =

Salamanca, Spain

Coordinates: 40.967973°N 5.679868°W

- Type: Seminary
- Established: 1627; 399 years ago
- Founders: William Semple; María de Ledesma
- Religious affiliation: Roman Catholic
- Rector: Fr. John Carroll
- Location: Salamanca, Spain (1988–present)

The Royal Scots College (Spanish: Real Colegio de Escoceses) is a major seminary in Salamanca, Spain, for the Catholic Church in Scotland. It was located originally at Madrid, then Valladolid, and has been in Salamanca since 1988.

== History ==
The Royal Scots College was founded at Madrid in 1627 by Colonel William Semple of Lochwinnoch and his wife, Doña María de Ledesma. Semple had spent his life in the military and diplomatic service of the Spanish crown.

The deed of foundation stipulated that the college was for students "Scottish by birth, preferably those of superior character and virtue and those who promise more fruit in the welfare of souls, and they have to spend whatever time may be necessary in studying Grammar and Philosophy, Theology, Controversies and Sacred Scripture, so that when they are well versed in all of these, they may proceed to the said Kingdom of Scotland to preach the Gospel and convert heretics... when they leave the said seminary for this purpose, others are to be received in their place having the same end, and thus the matter will continue for as long as the aforesaid conversion may require."

The Scottish Jesuit Hugh Semple was procurator or acting rector of the Scots College when it was located in Madrid, until his death in 1654. For much of its subsequent history in Madrid, the college was run by Spanish Jesuits, with rectors being appointed by the provincial in Toledo.

In 1726, following the insistence Queen Isabel and the Imperial Ambassador, King Philip V dismissed his chief confessor and appointed the rector of the college, William Clerk, to the post. Clerk resigned the rectorship and devoted the rest of his days to the post which was one of considerable influence.

In 1734 Scottish students were transferred to the Scots College in Douai, however the college still existed with a staff for the following 33 years. In 1767 following the expulsion of the Jesuits, the college closed and its assets transferred by royal decree, to the Irish College at Alcalá de Henares (outside Madrid). In 1771, the royal decree was annulled, and assets were returned to the Scottish church, and the college was transferred to Valladolid under the direction of Scottish secular clergy.

The college was closed from 1808 to 1816 due to the Peninsular War. Valladolid remained under the control of the French until 1812 and the building next to the college became a hospital and some of its employees lodged in the college. The rector was eventually ordered to accommodate French officers in 1810.

On 27 July 1828, Ferdinand VII and Maria Josepha Amalia of Saxony visited the college during a trip to Valladolid.

The college was transferred to Salamanca in 1988 in order for students to attend the Pontifical University of Salamanca.

In September 2020, a 1634 edition of The Two Noble Kinsmen, the last play by English playwright William Shakespeare, was reported to have been discovered at the Royal Scots College's library in Salamanca, Spain, which it is believed to be the oldest copy of any of his works in the country.

== Boecillo ==
The college once owned a summer house known as the Casa Grande in the village of Boecillo, eight miles south of Valladolid, on the River Duero. It was built in the 1790s at a time when students did not travel home during the summer months. John Geddes had recognized the need for a house in the country for the health of the students and benefit of the community and his successor Alexander Cameron began purchasing vineyards near the village in 1787. Eventually the ayuntamento of Boecillo gave Cameron one obrada of its land for the construction of a house. The house was partially habitable by 1795 and almost complete in early 1798 apart from a lack of doors and windows.

During the Peninsular War, the Duke of Wellington used the house at Boecillo twice as his head quarters in July and September 1812.

It continued to be used until the college left Valladolid in 1988 and was sold for development in the early 2000s.

== Rectors ==
Scots College in Madrid The college was administered by the Jesuit order, with the rector or superior appointed by the provincial of the order in Toledo

- Rev. Hugh Semple SJ (1627–54); rector-procurator of the Madrid College
- Rev. Andrew Youngson SJ (1654–55); administered college following Semple's death
- Rev. Adam Gordon SJ (1655–56); formerly rector of the Scots College Rome
- Rev. Frederick Maxwell SJ (1656–59)
- Rev. William Grant SJ (1659–65)
- Rev. James Anderson SJ (1665–81); position referred to as Rector, succeeded by Spanish rectors.
- Rev. Antonio de Rada (1688–1702)
- Rev. Fernando Cortes SJ (1711–14)
- Rev. Thomas Fife SJ (1714–17); rectorship reassigned to a Scottish Jesuit
- Rev. Kenneth (F.X.) Strachan SJ (1717–21)
- Rev. William Clerk SJ (1721–26); previously rector of Scots College Rome
- Rev. William MacGill SJ (1726–34)
- Rev. Ernest Little (1734); appointed, however before taking up appointment, Superior General ordered all students transferred to Scots College, Douai.
- Rev. Gabriel Bousemart (1734–41)
- Rev. Augustin Varona (1741–43)
- Rev. Antonio Espinosa (1743–46)
- Rev. Fabian de la Vega (1746–63)
- Rev. Cosmo Leon de Selva (1763–66/67)

Reestablishment and move to Valladolid

- Rev. John Geddes (1771–80); first rector following re-establishment of college and move to Valladolid
- Rev. Alexander Cameron (1780–98)
- Rev. John Gordon (1798–1810)
- Rev. Alexander Cameron (1810–33)
- Rev. John Cameron (1833–73)
- Rev. John Cowie (1873–79)
- Rev. David McDonald (1879–1903)
- Very Rev. John Canon Woods (1903–09)
- Rt. Rev. Mgr. James Humble (1909–40)
- Rev. Dr James Connolly (1940–52)
- Rt. Rev. Mgr. Philip Flanagan (1952–60)
- Rev. Daniel P. Boyle (1960–65)
- Rt. Rev. Mgr Maurice Taylor (1965–74)
- Very Rev. John Canon Walls (1974–81)
- Rev. John McGee (1981–87)
- Rt. Rev. Ian Murray (1987–94)
- Rev. William Dunnachie (1994–97)
- Rev. Denis E. Carlin (1997–2004)
- Rt. Rev. Mgr. Joseph Toal (2005–08)
- Rev. Charles O'Farrell (2009–14)
- Rev. Thomas A. Kilbride (2014–24)
- Rev. John Carroll (2024–present)

== Alumni ==
Former students of the college are known as the 'Ambrosians' or Ambrosianos, coming from the building of the old college in Valladolid which had been the College of St Ambrose. The Ambrosian Society is composed of former students, staff and others.

- Angus Chisholm (1759/60–1818), Vicar Apostolic of the Highland District
- Angus Bernard MacEachern (1759–1835), first Bishop of the Diocese of Charlottetown, Prince Edward Island
- Alexander Macdonnell (1762–1840), Bishop of Kingston
- William Fraser (1779–1851), Bishop of Arichat
- John Murdoch (1796–1865), Vicar Apostolic of the Western District
- George Rigg (1814–1887), Bishop of Dunkeld
- James McCarthy (1853–1943), Bishop of Galloway
- John Toner (1857–1949), Bishop of Dunkeld
- Allan MacDonald (1859–1905), priest, folklorist, and poet in the Scottish Gaelic language. One of the most important figures in 19th century Scottish Gaelic literature.
- Donald Martin (1873–1938), Bishop of Argyll and the Isles
- William Hart (1904-1992), Bishop of Dunkeld
- James Monaghan (1914–1994), Auxiliary Bishop of St Andrews and Edinburgh
- Ian Murray (1932–2016), Bishop of Argyll and the Isles
- Joseph Toal (born 1956), Bishop of Motherwell
- Martin Chambers (1964–2024), Bishop-Elect of Dunkeld

== See also ==
- Scots College, Rome
- Scots College, Paris
- Scots College, Douai
- Scots Monastery, Regensburg
