= St Kieran's R.C. Church, Campbeltown =

St Kieran's Church, Campbeltown
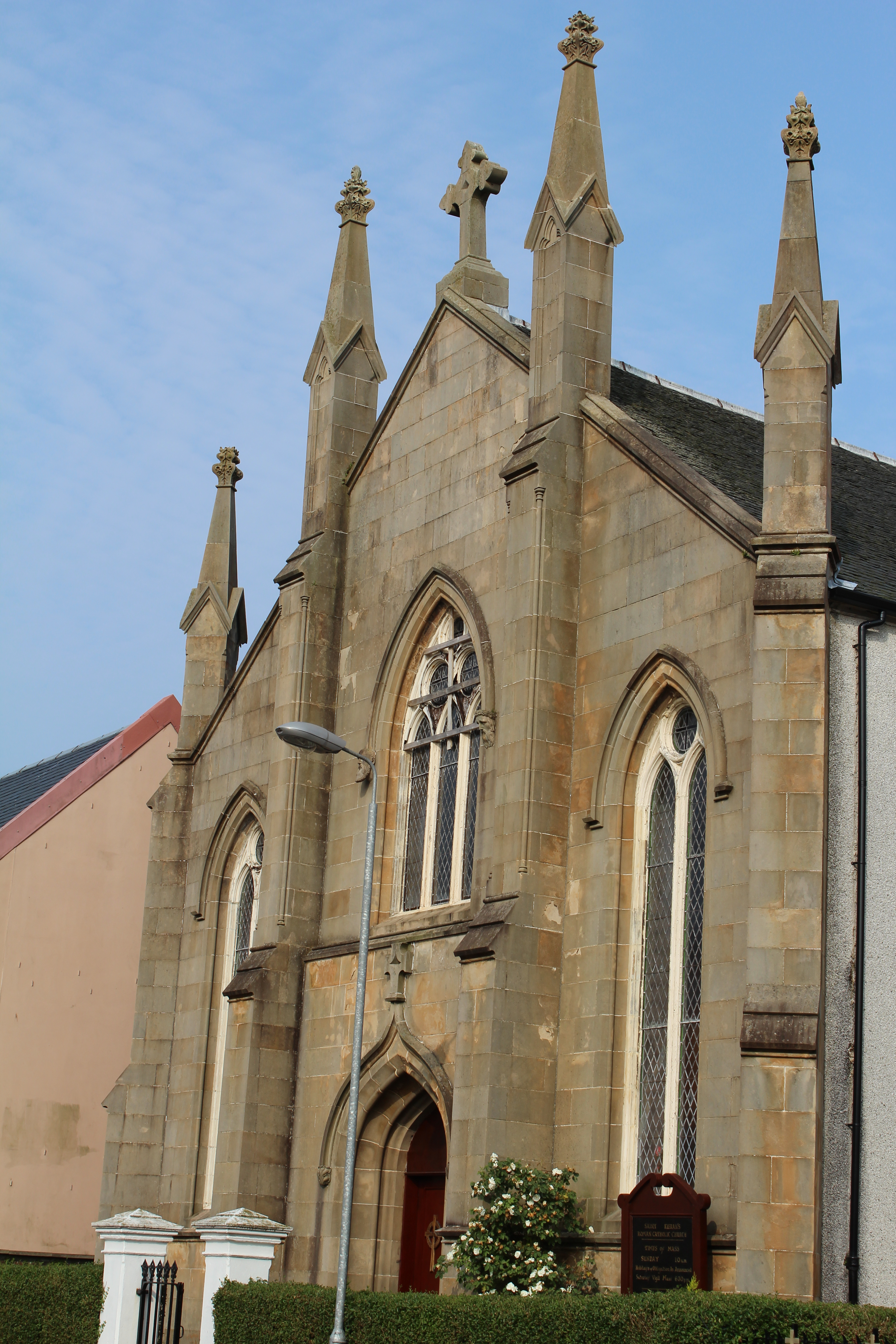
- St Kieran's Church, Campbeltown
- St Kieran's Church, Campbeltown
- 55°25′23″N 5°36′16″W
- Location: Campbeltown, Argyll and Bute
- Country: Scotland
- Denomination: Roman Catholic
- Website: stkieranscampbeltown.org

History
- Status: Parish church
- Dedication: Ciarán of Clonmacnoise

Architecture
- Functional status: Active
- Heritage designation: Category C listed building
- Designated: 28 March 1996
- Style: Gothic
- Groundbreaking: 1849
- Completed: 1850

Administration
- Diocese: Argyll and the Isles
- Parish: Campbeltown

St Kieran's R.C. Church is a Category C listed building in Campbeltown, Argyll and Bute.

== History ==
The first church on the site was erected in 1809. This building of 1809 was replaced between 1849 and 1850 by the current building. It contains a plaque to James Cattenach (d. 1836) who is thought to have been responsible for the original 1809 building. The translation of the Latin inscription reads: "Pray for James Cattenah, a priest of this parish, who after working for 55 years, died in 1836, at the age of 85".

The church contain a memorial crafted by Italian sculptors and modelled on the grotto at Lourdes to the ten men of the parish who fell during the First World War and two who died afterwards from its effects.
