= Roman Catholic bishop of Argyll and the Isles =

Catholic ecclesial title in Scotland

Bishop of Argyll and the Isles
- Bishopric

catholic
- Incumbent: Brian McGee (bishop)

Location
- Ecclesiastical province: St Andrews and Edinburgh

Information
- First holder: Angus MacDonald
- Established: 1878
- Diocese: Argyll and the Isles
- Cathedral: St Columba's Cathedral, Oban

The Bishop of Argyll and the Isles is the ordinary of the Roman Catholic Diocese of Argyll and the Isles in the Province of Saint Andrews and Edinburgh, Scotland.

The Scottish hierarchy was restored by Pope Leo XIII on 15 March 1878 and the ancient bishoprics of Argyll and the Isles were re-established and united under one bishop. The diocese covers an area of 31,080 km^{2} (12,000 sq mi) and comprises most of Argyll and Bute, the southern part of the Highland council area, the Outer Hebrides, and the Isle of Arran. The Episcopal see is in the town of Oban where the bishop's seat is located at the Cathedral Church of St. Columba.

On 28 December 2015 Pope Francis appointed Monsignor Brian McGee as bishop.

== List of the Roman Catholic Bishops of Argyll and the Isles ==
Roman Catholic Bishops of Argyll and the Isles
From	Until	Incumbent	Notes
1878	1892	Angus MacDonald	Appointed bishop on 22 March 1878 and consecrated on 23 May 1878. Translated to St Andrews & Edinburgh on 15 July 1892.
1892	1918	George John Smith	Appointed bishop on 31 December 1892 and consecrated on 25 April 1893. Died in office on 18 January 1918.
1919	1938	Donald Martin	Appointed bishop on 2 April 1919 and consecrated on 11 June 1919. Died in office on 6 December 1938.
1939	1945	Donald Alphonsus Campbell	Appointed bishop on 5 October 1939 and consecrated on 14 December 1939. Translated to Glasgow on 6 January 1945.
1945	1959	Kenneth Grant	Appointed bishop on 15 December 1945 and consecrated on 27 February 1946. Died in office on 7 September 1959.
1960	1968	Stephen McGill PSS	Appointed bishop on 4 April 1960 and consecrated on 22 June 1960. Translated to Paisley on 25 July 1968.
1968	1990	Colin Aloysius MacPherson	Appointed bishop on 2 December 1968 and consecrated on 6 February 1969. Died in office on 24 March 1990.
1990	1996	Roderick Wright	Appointed bishop on 11 December 1990 and consecrated on 15 January 1991. Resigned on 19 September 1996 and died on 23 May 2005.
1996	1999	sede vacante	Keith O'Brien, Archbishop of St Andrews & Edinburgh was appointed Apostolic Administrator of the Diocese of Argyll and the Isles in June 1996 and resigned the post in October 1999.
1999	2008	Ian Murray	Appointed bishop on 3 November 1999 and consecrated on 7 December 1999. Retired on 16 October 2008.
2008	2014	Joseph Anthony Toal	Formerly Rector of the Royal Scots College in Salamanca, Spain. Appointed bishop on 16 October 2008 and consecrated on 8 December 2008. Transferred to Motherwell in 2014.
2015	present	Brian McGee	

== See also ==
- Bishop of Argyll
- Bishop of the Isles
- Roman Catholicism in Scotland
