= Roybridge =

Coordinates: 56.891°N 4.841°W

Roybridge: Scottish Gaelic: Drochaid Ruaidh
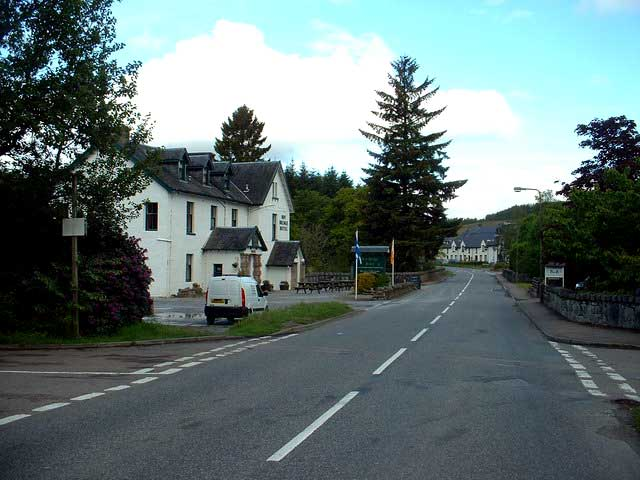

- Location within the Lochaber area
- OS grid reference: NN269807
- Council area: Highland
- Country: Scotland
- Sovereign state: United Kingdom
- Post town: Roy Bridge
- Postcode district: PH31
- Dialling code: 01397
- Police: Scotland
- Fire: Scottish
- Ambulance: Scottish
- UK Parliament: Ross, Skye and Lochaber
- Scottish Parliament: Inverness East, Nairn and Lochaber

Roybridge (Scottish Gaelic: Drochaid Ruaidh, 'the bridge over the Roy') is a small village, that lies at the confluence of the rivers River Roy and River Spean, located three miles (five kilometres) east of Spean Bridge, in Kilmonivaig Parish, Inverness-shire, Scottish Highlands and is in the Highland administrative area.

== Transport ==
Roybridge is on the A86 between the settlements of Spean Bridge and Newtonmore, and has a railway station with one platform on the (former West Highland Railway) line, served by trains passing between Crianlarich and Fort William.

== Mary MacKillop ==
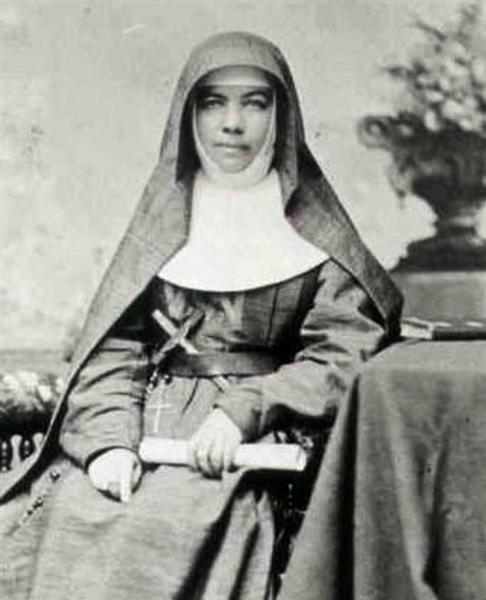
Mary MacKillop

Both of the parents of Australia's only recognised saint, Mary MacKillop, lived in Roybridge, prior to emigrating to Australia. MacKillop visited Roybridge in the 1870s, and St Margaret's, the local parish church of the Roman Catholic Diocese of Argyll and the Isles, now has a shrine to her.

== Other notable people ==
- Iain Lom (c.1624-1710), a Cavalier poet from Clan MacDonald of Keppoch, first Poet Laureate of Scotland, and senior figure in the canon of Scottish Gaelic literature. Buried at Cille Choiril, just east of Roybridge and near his former home at Allt a' Chaorainn.
- Peter Hope, 4th Baron Rankeillour (1935–2005), landowner and peer, lived at Achaderry House.
- Joseph Toal, current bishop of Diocese of Motherwell.
