= Marienfeld Abbey (Austria) =

Nunnery in Marienfeld, Austria

Coordinates: 48°36′49″N 16°07′23″E

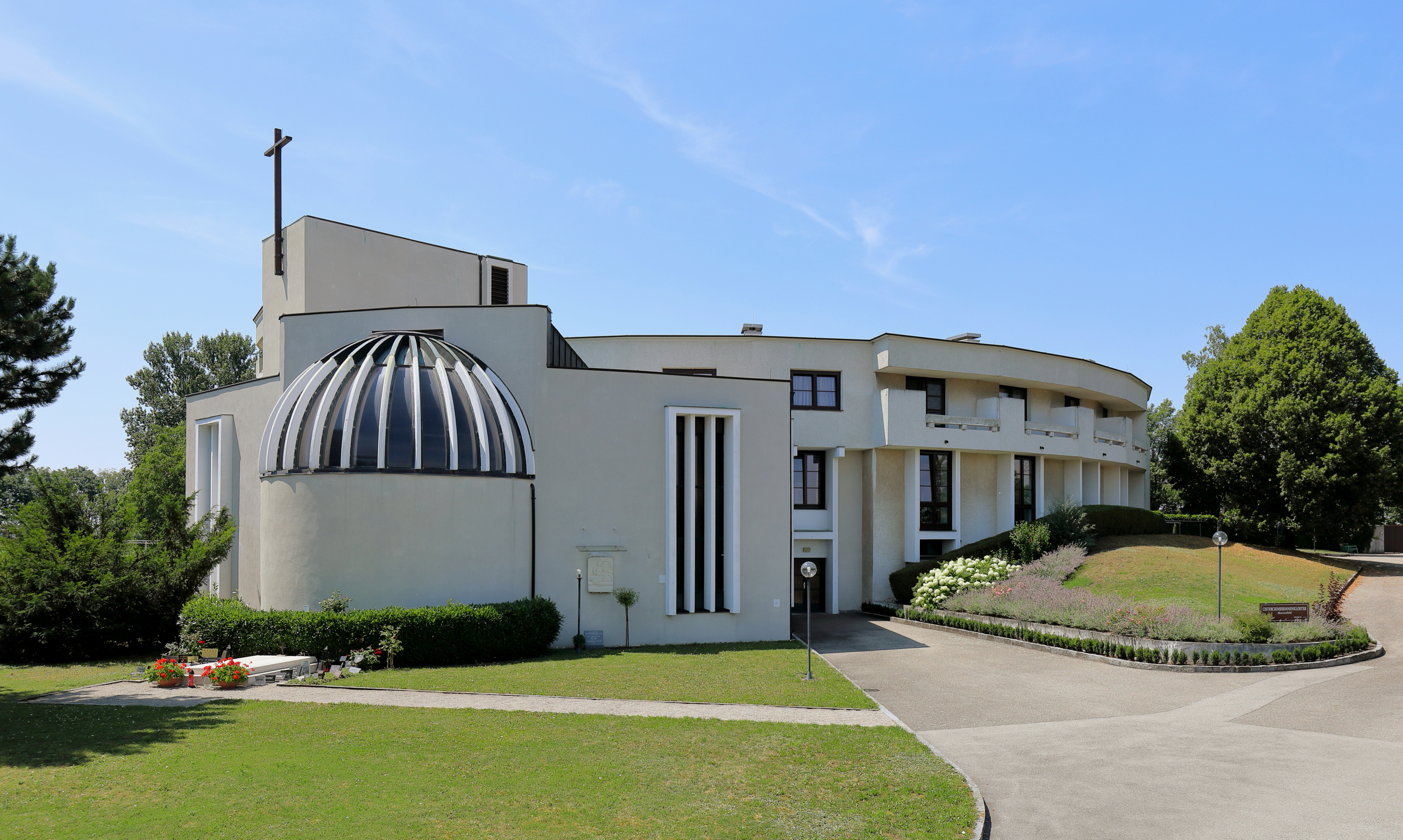
Marienfeld Abbey

Marienfeld Abbey is an Austrian Cistercian nunnery in Marienfeld, Wullersdorf, eight kilometres north of Hollabrunn. It was founded by Hans Hermann Groër as a sister house of Mariastern Abbey.

Its construction began in 1974 and it was opened on 14 November 1982 by Franz König, then Archbishop of Vienna; the nunnery was declared as independent in 1991.

By 2014, the nunnery had 18 sisters; they made some income through their vestment workshop and used their vegetable and fruit garden for self-sufficiency.

== Abbesses ==
There have been four abbesses at the Abbey;

- Founding abbess, Sr. Maria Agnes Fabianek OCist (Cistercian Abbey of Mariastern)
- First abbess, Sr. Maria Benedikta Deninger OCist (May 14, 2000)
- Second abbess, Sr. Maria Hedwig Pauer OCist (July 11, 2014)
- Third abbess, Sr Maria Immaculata Maierhofer OCist (September 29, 2023)
