= Hans Hermann Groër =

Austrian Catholic prelate (1919–2003)

His Eminence Hans Hermann Groër OSB
- Cardinal, Archbishop of Vienna
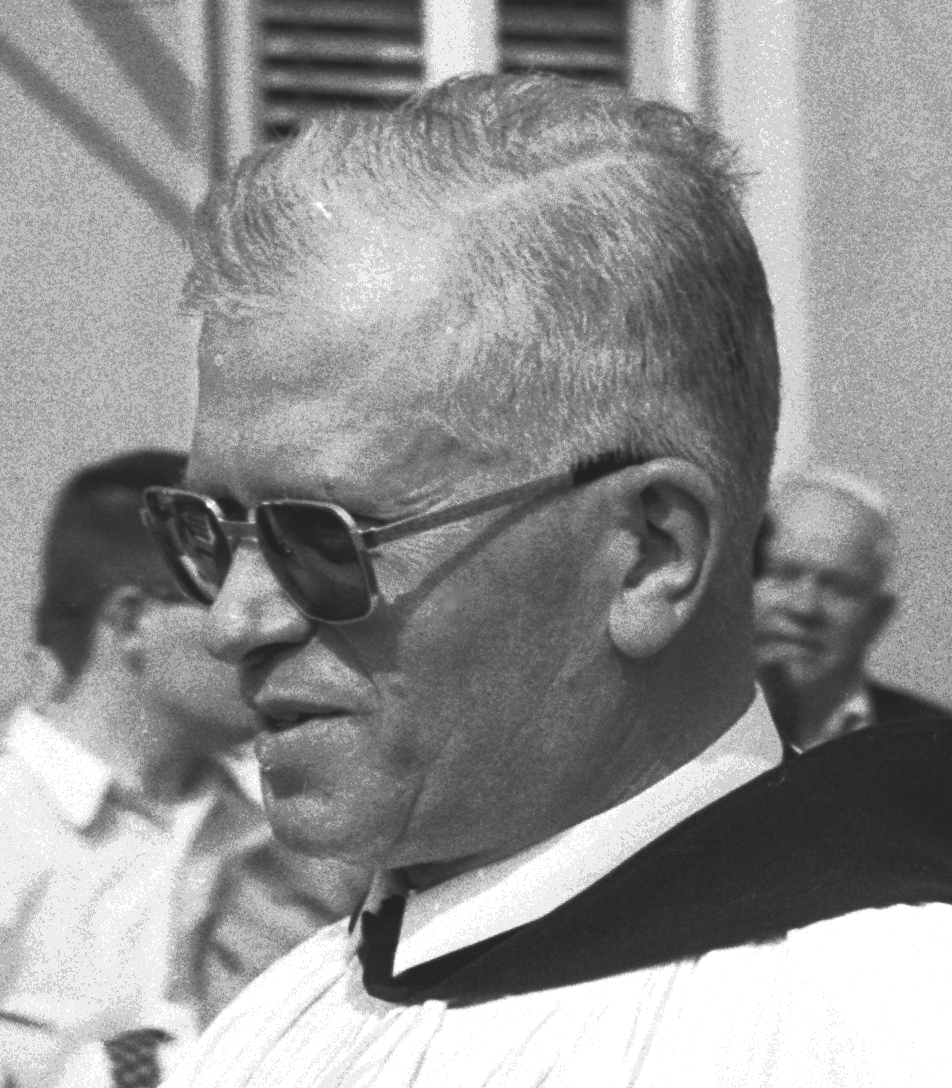
- Groër in 1975
- Archdiocese: Vienna
- See: Vienna
- Appointed: 15 July 1986
- Installed: 14 September 1986
- Term ended: 14 September 1995
- Predecessor: Franz König
- Successor: Christoph Schönborn
- Other posts: Cardinal-Priest of Santi Gioacchino ed Anna al Tuscolano; Ordinary for the Austrian Ordinariate for the Faithful of Eastern Rites

Orders
- Ordination: 12 April 1942 by Theodor Innitzer
- Consecration: 14 September 1986 by Franz König
- Created cardinal: 28 June 1988 by Pope John Paul II
- Rank: Cardinal-Priest

Personal details
- Born: Hans Wilhelm Groër; 13 October 1919 Vienna, Austria
- Died: 24 March 2003 (aged 83) Sankt Pölten, Austria
- Buried: Marienfeld Abbey, Austria
- Denomination: Roman Catholic
- Coat of arms: Hans Hermann Groër's coat of arms

Hans Hermann Wilhelm Groër, OSB (13 October 1919 – 24 March 2003) was an Austrian Catholic prelate who served as Archbishop of Vienna from 1986 to 1995 and became a cardinal in 1988. Pope John Paul II replaced him as archbishop after he became the subject of multiple allegations of child sexual abuse. At John Paul's request, Groër relinquished all ecclesiastical duties and privileges as an archbishop and cardinal on 14 April 1998.

== Biography ==
Groër was born in Vienna to German parents, with whom he moved in 1929 to Czechoslovakia, where they remained for the next decade. He attended seminaries in Hollabrunn and Vienna (where he received his doctorate in theology) before being ordained to the priesthood on 12 April 1942 by Cardinal Theodor Innitzer. Groër then served as a chaplain in Petronell and Bad Vöslau until 1946, when he became Prefect of Studies at the minor seminary of Hollabrunn. He entered the Order of Saint Benedict in 1974 and took the name Hermann upon his solemn profession of vows on 8 September 1980. That same year Groër was named the spiritual director of the Legion of Mary for Austria.

On 15 July 1986, he was appointed the fifteenth Archbishop of Vienna, succeeding Cardinal Franz König. Groër received his episcopal consecration on the following 14 September from König, with Archbishop Karl Berg and Bishop Stefan László serving as co-consecrators. He was created Cardinal Priest of Santi Gioacchino ed Anna al Tuscolano by Pope John Paul II in the consistory of 28 June 1988.

== Sexual abuse of school boys, monks ==
In 1995, one of Groër's former school students accused him of sexual molestation. A number of others made similar charges shortly thereafter, as did some monks. Pope John Paul II promoted Christoph Schönborn from auxiliary bishop to Coadjutor Archbishop of Vienna on 13 April 1995 and later in the year accepted the resignation Groër had submitted as required on his 75th birthday in October 1994. Groër moved to the Roggendorf monastery, where he served as prior. When new allegations surfaced, Austrian Church officials appealed to the pope, who initiated an investigation in February 1998. In April, at the pope's request, Groër resigned as prior and withdrew from public life. He released a statement in which he asked for forgiveness but made no admission of guilt. The statement read: "In the past three years there have been many often incorrect statements concerning me. I ask God and the people for forgiveness if I have brought guilt upon myself." After surrendering his Church duties and duties as a Cardinal, Groër left Austria as part of a "self imposed exile" for several months and moved into a convent near Dresden, Germany. He continued to work as a confessor in women's monasteries, received visitors and said Mass. Suffering from cancer, his health declined rapidly.

Austria's statute of limitations prevented civil authorities from prosecuting Groër. In 2010, Cardinal Schönborn (elevated to that rank in 1998) said that Cardinal Joseph Ratzinger had attempted to convince Pope John Paul II to initiate the investigation and—in a conversation with journalists that Schönborn thought was private—said that Cardinal Angelo Sodano had blocked his attempt to investigate Groër's activities. (Note: Pope Benedict XVI met with Schönborn on 28 June 2010 and they were then joined by Sodano. Accounts of their discussions varied.) Church officials are also alleged to have offered some of Groër's former pupils compensation in return for agreeing not to repeat their charges against him. Hubertus Czernin, author of a book about the case, believes that Groër abused more than 2,000 young men. Groër continued to deny the allegations until his death.

== Death and eulogies ==
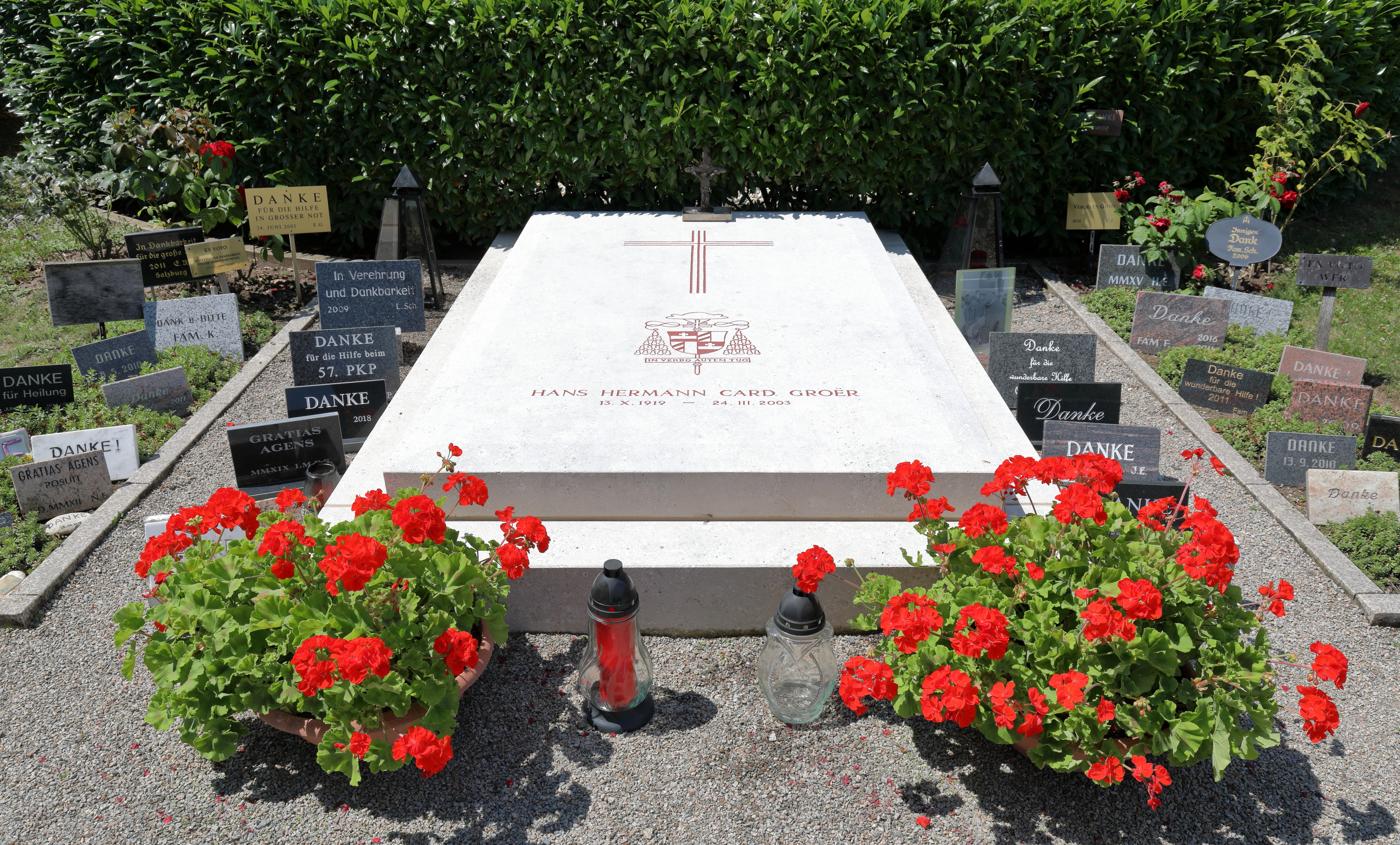
The grave of Cardinal Groër, in the upper left an ex-voto tablet

Groër died on 24 March 2003 of pneumonia at a hospital in Sankt Pölten, where he had been treated for cancer. Cardinal Schönborn presided at the requiem Mass in St. Stephen's Cathedral and in his homily honoured his predecessor's accomplishments in strengthening Marian devotions in the Archdiocese as well as fostering priestly and monastic vocations. The next day, Cardinal Joachim Meisner, Archbishop of Cologne, referenced the charges against Groër in his eulogy only to describe how Groër had suffered, noting how Groër was "deeply wounded, even stigmatized by the incidents during his last years as Archbishop of Vienna", that "when the dark cloud gathered over his life ... he sank into loneliness and contempt".

Groër was buried in the cemetery of Marienfeld Abbey, the Cistercian women's monastery he was instrumental in founding in 1974.

== Notes ==
Catholic Church titles
Preceded by Franz König	Archbishop of Vienna; 1986–1995	Succeeded by Christoph Schönborn
New title	Cardinal Priest of Santi Gioacchino ed Anna al Tuscolano; 1988–2003	Succeeded by Keith O'Brien
