= George Smith (bishop of Argyll and the Isles) =

Scottish Catholic clergyman

The Right Reverend George Smith
- Bishop of Argyll and the Isles
- Church: Roman Catholic
- Diocese: Argyll and the Isles
- Appointed: 31 December 1892
- Term ended: 18 January 1918
- Predecessor: Angus MacDonald
- Successor: Donald Martin

Orders
- Ordination: 17 December 1864 by Guglielmo Massaia
- Consecration: 25 April 1893 by Angus MacDonald

Personal details
- Born: 24 January 1840 Cuttlebrae, Banffshire, Scotland
- Died: 18 January 1918 (aged 77) Oban, Argyll, Scotland
- Education: Blairs College; Benedictine College, Douai
- Alma mater: Saint-Sulpice Seminary

George John Smith (24 January 1840 – 18 January 1918) was a Scottish Catholic clergyman who served as the Bishop of Argyll and the Isles from 1892 to 1918.

== Life ==
Born in Cuttlebrae, Banffshire, Scotland on 24 January 1840, he was educated at Blairs College and then the Benedictine College at Douai, after which he proceeded to the Seminary of Issy. He was ordained to the priesthood on 17 December 1864 by Guglielmo Massaia. He was appointed the Bishop of the Diocese of Argyll and the Isles by the Holy See on 31 December 1892, and consecrated to the Episcopate on 25 April 1893. The principal consecrator was Archbishop Angus MacDonald of St Andrews and Edinburgh, and the principal co-consecrators were Bishop Hugh MacDonald of Aberdeen and Bishop James August Smith of Dunkeld (later Archbishop of St Andrews and Edinburgh).

John Lorne Campbell, however, has subtly criticized the Vatican's decision to appoint Bishop Smith to an overwhelmingly Gaelic-speaking Diocese. This is because Bishop Smith was "a successor who, although a man of holy personality, knew no Gaelic."

He died in office on 18 January 1918, aged 78.

Catholic Church titles
Preceded by Angus MacDonald	Bishop of Argyll and the Isles; 1892–1918	Succeeded by Donald Martin
