= Joe Docherty, Baron Docherty of Milngavie =

British business and education executive and life peer (born 1969)

The Right Honourable The Lord Docherty of Milngavie
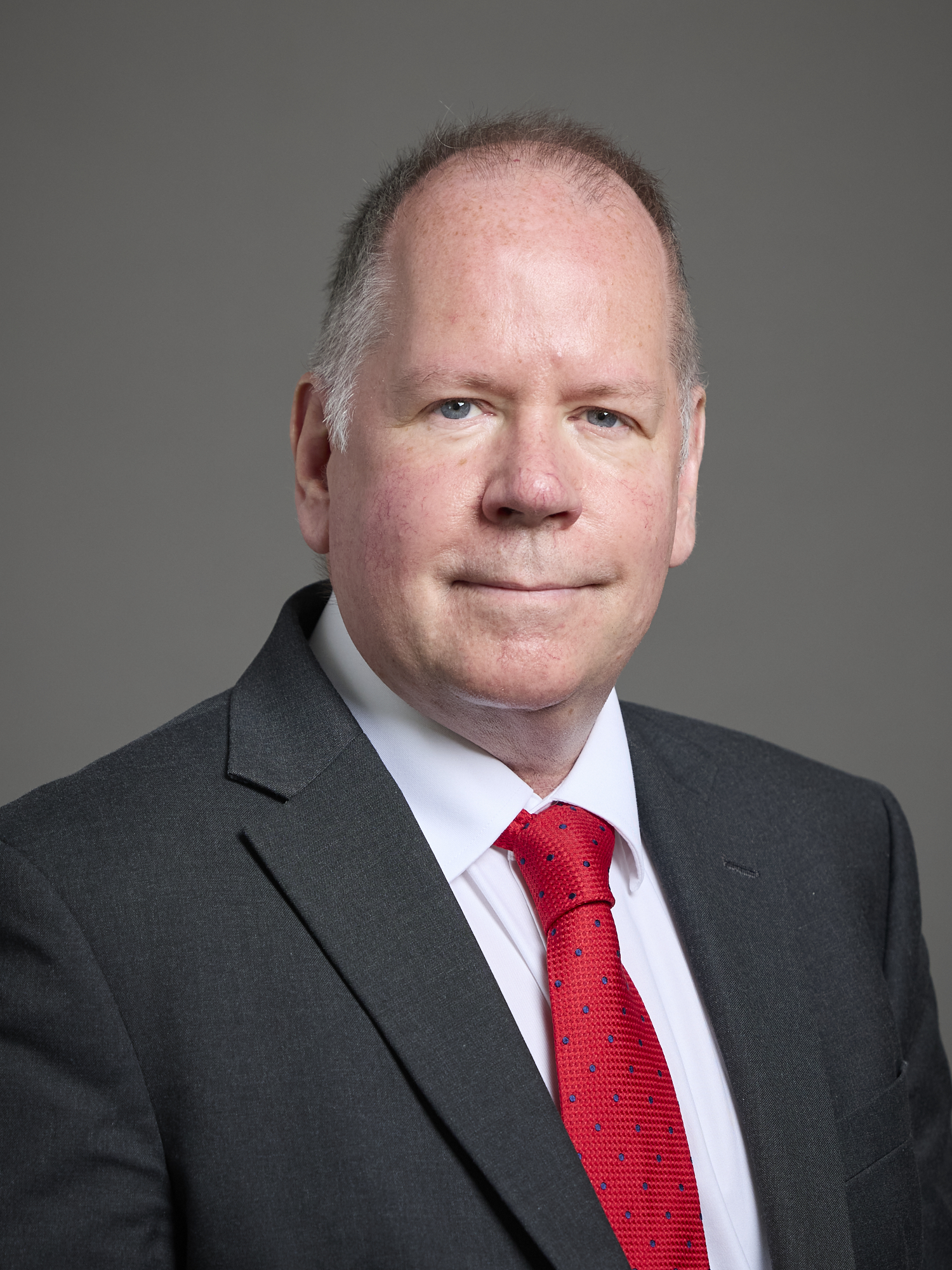
- Official portrait, 2026

Member of the House of Lords
- Lord Temporal
- Life peerage 12 January 2026

Personal details
- Born: Joseph Paul Docherty; 7 September 1969 (age 57) Helensburgh, Scotland
- Party: Labour (1994–present) (Note: Suspended since 28 February 2026.)
- Education: University of Strathclyde; Harvard Business School

Joseph Paul Docherty, Baron Docherty of Milngavie (born 7 September 1969) is a British business and education executive. He was made a life peer in January 2026 for the Labour Party, but has sat as a non-affiliated member of the House of Lords since having been suspended the following month.

== Education ==
Docherty was educated at St Ninian's High School, Kirkintilloch, the University of Strathclyde (BEng, 1992; MPhil, 1994) and Harvard Business School, where he completed the Advanced Management Program as a Ralph James Scholar in 2011.

== Career ==
Docherty was the 5th London-wide list candidate for the Labour Party in the 2000 London Assembly election.

Docherty was Chief Executive of Tees Valley Regeneration from 2002 to 2009.

He was managing director of Bede Homes, Chair of the Northern Powergrid Foundation, Trustee of the Esmée Fairbairn Foundation, and Chair of Council of Durham University from 2018 to 2025. In 2025, he was appointed as a non-executive director of Hellens Residential.

He was nominated for a life peerage in the 2025 Political Peerages and on 12 January 2026 created Baron Docherty of Milngavie, of Alexandria in the County of Dunbartonshire. In February 2026, it was revealed that he had resigned in 2018 as chief executive of NCG, formerly Newcastle College Group, following allegations of sexual liaisons at work, including exchanging sexual messages during an Ofsted inspection and using hotels paid for by NCG to meet partners during work hours. Following the revelations, he was suspended from the Labour Party pending an investigation.
