= Santi Gioacchino e Anna al Tuscolano =

- Church of Saints Joachim and Anne in Tuscolano
- Chiesa di Santi Gioacchino e Anna al Tuscolano
- Click on the map for a fullscreen view
- 41.8521°N 12.5878°E
- Location: Viale Bruno Rizzieri 120, Rome
- Country: Italy
- Language: Italian
- Denomination: Catholic
- Tradition: Roman Rite
- Website: Official website

History
- Status: Titular church
- Dedication: Saint Joachim and Saint Anne
- Dedicated: 12 April 1984

Architecture
- Architect: Sandro Benedetti
- Style: Modern
- Groundbreaking: 1982
- Completed: 1984

Administration
- Diocese: Rome

Saints Joachim and Anne in Tuscolano (Italian: Santi Gioacchino ed Anna al Tuscolano) is a church in Rome. The church is dedicated to Saints Joachim and Anne, parents of the Virgin Mary.

On 28 June 1988, this church was erected as a cardinal's title. The first two cardinal priests to hold title to this church were Hans Hermann Groer, O.S.B. and Keith O'Brien. Each of these cardinals was implicated in sexual scandals and renounced his privileges as cardinal. The title has been held by Toribio Ticona Porco since 28 June 2018.

== Cardinal-priests ==
- Hans Hermann Groer, OSB (28 June 1988 – 24 March 2003)
- Keith O'Brien (21 October 2003 – 19 March 2018)
- Toribio Ticona Porco (28 June 2018 – present)
