= Hugh Sempill =

Scottish mathematician (between 1589 and 1596 – 1654)

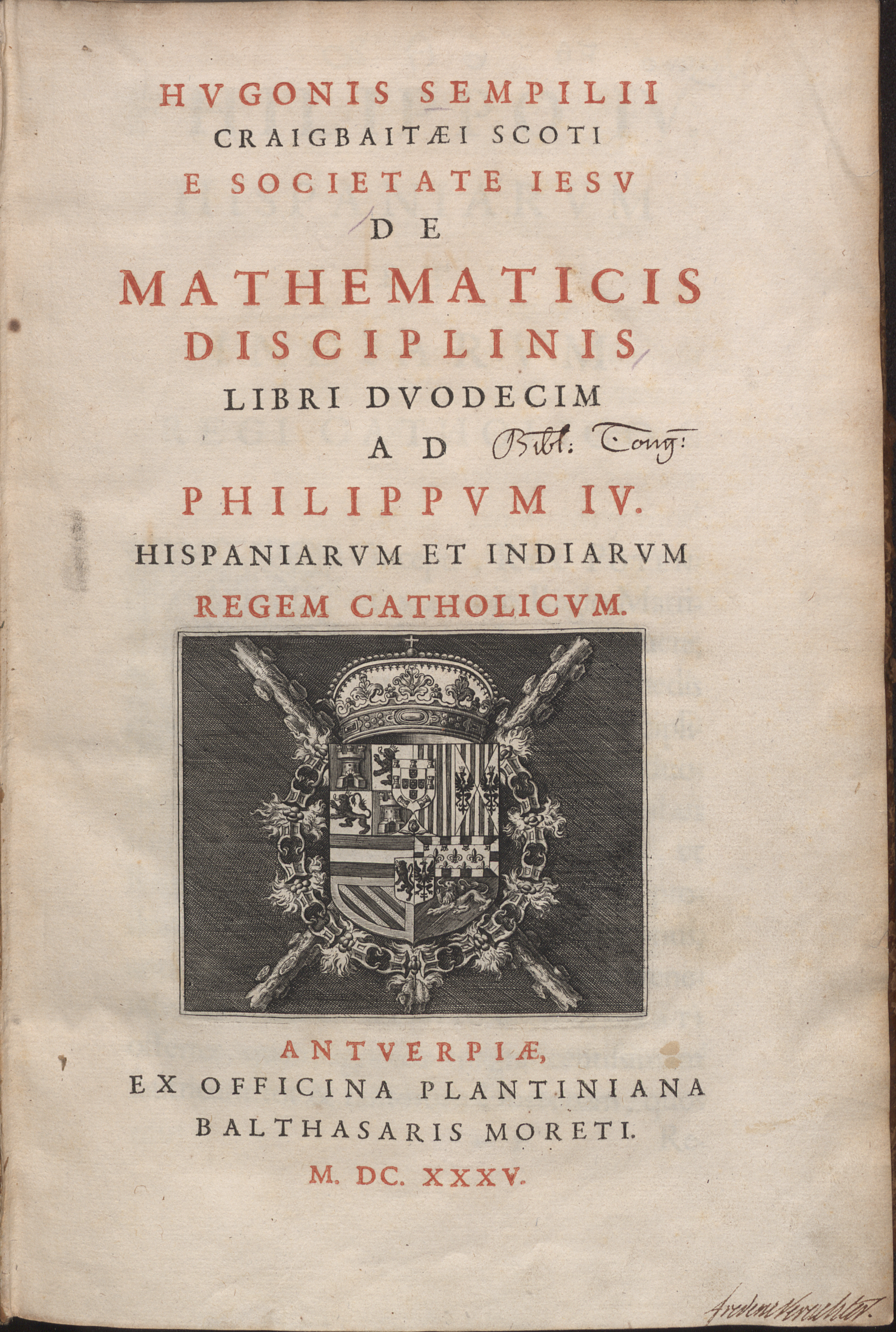
- De mathematicis disciplinis, 1635
- Born: 1589; Craigbait, Renfrewshire, Kingdom of Scotland
- Died: 19 September 1654 (aged 64–65); Madrid, Kingdom of Spain
- Other names: Hugo Sempilius; Hugh Semple
- Occupations: Jesuit; mathematician
- Employers: Royal Scots College; Colegio Imperial de Madrid
- Known for: De Mathematicis disciplinis Libri duodecim

Hugh Sempill (or Semple; in Latin Hugo Simpelius or Sempilius; 1589 – 19 September 1654) was a Scottish Jesuit mathematician and linguist. He describes himself in his work as Craigbaitaeus, having inherited landholdings at Craigbait from his grandfather.

== Biography ==
Born in 1589, he was the son of Robert Semple of Craigbait, Renfrewshire. He was a cadet of the noble family of Sempill. He entered the Jesuit novitiate of the Province Toledo in 1615, and studied at the University of Alcalá. Sempill taught as professor of mathematics at the Colegio Imperial de Madrid (Imperial College of Madrid), which employed teachers from all over Europe and made courses in geometry, geography, hydrography, and horology.

He also served as procurator of the Royal Scots College in Madrid (now located in Salamanca). During Sempill's tenure the college is thought to have acquired, perhaps at Sempill's behest, a collection of Jacobean and Caroline era stage plays in quarto editions, among them The Two Noble Kinsmen by William Shakespeare and John Fletcher.

He died in the Colegio Imperial de Madrid on 13 September 1654.

The crater Simpelius on the Moon is named after him. The name was originally assigned by Riccioli in 1651.

== Works ==
Sempill's De Mathematicis disciplinis Libri duodecim (Antwerp, ex officina B. Moreti, 1635), dedicated to Philip IV of Spain, was a work that was read across Europe (his work was cited, for example, by the Jesuit Philippus Brietius in the Frenchman's own Parallela Geographiae). It is divided into twelve chapters, the first two being the most interesting. In chapter one he discusses the position of pure mathematics in relation to science. He gives a short historical account, with references to contemporary mathematicians, and then contrasts the views of Aristotle (which he follows) with more contemporaneous authors who cast doubts on the possibility of fitting mathematics as a science into the cadre of knowledge. In the second chapter he discusses mathematics from the aspect of its various applications. In the remaining chapters he considers: geometry and arithmetic, which are dealt with briefly; optics; statics, in which a variety of mechanical topics including pyrotechnics and automata are considered; music; cosmography; geography, in which he includes a discussion on the Americas, using Spanish as well as Latin in the heading of a table concerning rents of metropolitan churches and cathedrals; hydrography, air, atmosphere, the sunset, meteorites, volcanoes, and comets; astronomy, in which a reference is made to Copernicus' astronomical observations; astrology, in which he discusses licit and illicit astrology, and reproduces the papal bull of Pope Sixtus V refuting astrology; and, in the last chapter, the calendar. The book ends with a large index, of over sixty pages. This section of the book may be a preliminary version of a 'Dictionarium mathematicum' of his, which was never published.

In 1642 Sempill published, in Madrid, Experientia mathematica de compositione numerorum, linearum, quadratorum, &c., in which he discusses basic algebra. The Biblioteca Nacional de España possesses four more of his works in manuscript: Historia de Regimine Philippi IV; Parecer sobre el riego de los prados de Aranjuéz y lugares vecinos en tiempos de Felipe IV; Parecer sobre las señales que se vieron en el cielo, año 1637; and Discurso contra los ministros codiciosos. Sempill's significance lay in the scope of his desire to promote the application of mathematics to science.

=== Bibliography ===
- Semple, Hugh (1635). De mathematicis disciplinis Libri XII (in Latin). Antuerpiae: Officina Plantiniana, Balthasar Moretus.
- Experientia Mathematica, de compositione numerorum, linearum, quadratorum. Matriti: ex typographia regia. 1642.
- Dictionarium Mathematicum
