= Toribio Ticona Porco =

Bolivian Catholic cardinal (born 1937)

His Eminence Toribio Ticona Porco
- Prelate emeritus of Corocoro
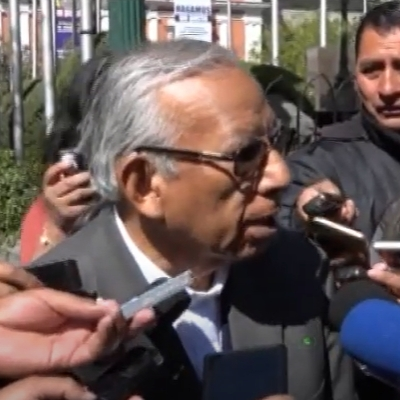
- Porco in 2018
- Church: Roman Catholic Church
- See: Corocoro
- Appointed: 4 June 1992
- Term ended: 29 June 2012
- Predecessor: Jesús Agustín López de Lama
- Successor: Percy Lorenzo Galván Flores
- Other post: Cardinal-Priest of Santi Gioacchino e Anna al Tuscolano (2018–)
- Previous posts: Auxiliary Bishop of Potosí (1986–92); Titular Bishop of Timici (1986–92)

Orders
- Ordination: 29 January 1967 by Cleto Loayza Gumiel
- Consecration: 31 May 1986 by Santos Abril y Castelló
- Created cardinal: 28 June 2018 by Pope Francis
- Rank: Cardinal-Priest

Personal details
- Born: Toribio Ticona Porco; 25 April 1937 (age 89) Atocha, Bolivia
- Coat of arms

Toribio Ticona Porco (Spanish pronunciation: [toˈɾi.βjo tiˈkona ˈpoɾko]; born 25 April 1937) is a Bolivian prelate of the Catholic Church. He was Prelate of the Territorial Prelature of Corocoro from 1992 to 2012 after serving as Auxiliary Bishop of Potosí from 1986 to 1992. Pope Francis made him a cardinal on 28 June 2018.

Of Quechuan origin, he was the first Latin American cardinal from one of the continent's indigenous ethnic groups.

== Biography ==
Toribio Ticona Porco was born in Atocha in the Potosi Department of Bolivia, on 25 April 1937. He was raised by his mother and never knew his father. He worked shining shoes and selling newspaper, was a bricklayer's assistant and an auto mechanic and worked in a brewery. He became a Catholic under the influence of Belgian missionaries. He first worked for the missionaries as a bell ringer and secretary in Atocha. He began his preparation for the priesthood in 1962 at a center for late vocations in Chile, but returned to Bolivia after only two months. At the Belgians' insistence he studied philosophy and theology for four years at the seminary in Sucre. He was ordained a priest of the Diocese of Potosí on 29 January 1967. He did further studies at the Pastoral Institute of CELAM and at the Center Lumen Vitae in Brussels. While a priest in Chacarilla, a mining town of 2,000 people, he was mayor for 14 years.

On 5 April 1986, Pope John Paul II appointed him titular bishop of Timici and auxiliary bishop of Potosí, and he was consecrated a bishop on 31 May 1986 by Archbishop Santos Abril y Castelló, the apostolic nuncio to Bolivia. As an auxiliary bishop, he worked in the mining region of northern Potosí, based in the town of Uncía in Chayanta Province.

On 4 June 1992, John Paul appointed him Prelate of the Territorial Prelature of Corocoro.

Pope Benedict XVI accepted his resignation on 29 June 2012.

On 20 May 2018 Pope Francis announced he would make Ticona a cardinal on 28 June. Ticona learned of the surprise appointment while visiting his mother's grave near Quillacollo. At the 28 June consistory, he was assigned the titular church of Santi Gioacchino ed Anna al Tuscolano. Bolivian President Evo Morales attended the ceremony and said he witnessed the creation of "our first indigenous cardinal and worker" with "profound happiness and joy".

== See also ==
- Cardinals created by Francis
- Catholic Church in Bolivia

Catholic Church titles
| Preceded by Ramón Darío Molina Jaramillo | — TITULAR — Titular Bishop of Timici; 5 April 1986 – 4 June 1992 | Succeeded by Francisco Cases Andreu |
| Preceded by Jesús Agustín López de Lama | Prelate of Corocoro; 4 June 1992 – 29 June 2012 | Succeeded by Percy Lorenzo Galván Flores |
| Preceded by Keith O'Brien | Cardinal-Priest of Santi Gioacchino e Anna al Tuscolano; 28 June 2018 - | Incumbent |
