= Colin MacPherson =

Catholic bishop

The Right Reverend Colin MacPherson
- Bishop of Argyll and the Isles
- Church: Roman Catholic Church
- Appointed: 2 December 1968
- Term ended: 24 March 1990
- Predecessor: Stephen McGill
- Successor: Roderick Wright

Orders
- Ordination: 23 March 1940
- Consecration: 6 February 1969 by Igino Eugenio Cardinale

Personal details
- Born: 5 August 1917 Lochboisdale, Scotland
- Died: 24 March 1990 (aged 72) Oban, Scotland
- Education: Propaganda College, Rome

Colin Aloysius MacPherson (1917–1990) was a Scottish Roman Catholic clergyman who served as the Bishop of Argyll and the Isles from 1968 to 1990.

== Life ==
He was born in Lochboisdale on the island of South Uist, Scotland on 5 August 1917. He trained for the priesthood at the Propaganda College in Rome and was ordained to the priesthood on 23 March 1940. He was appointed Bishop of the Diocese of Argyll and the Isles by the Holy See on 2 December 1968, and consecrated to the Episcopate on 6 February 1969. The principal consecrator was Igino Eugenio Cardinale, Titular Archbishop of Nepte, and the principal co-consecrators were Gordon Gray, Archbishop of St Andrews and Edinburgh and Stephen McGill, Bishop of Paisley.

He died in office on 24 March 1990, aged 72.

Catholic Church titles
Preceded by Stephen McGill	Bishop of Argyll and the Isles; 1968–1990	Succeeded by Roderick Wright
