= Mariastern Abbey, Hohenweiler =

Coordinates: 47°34′12″N 9°46′19″E

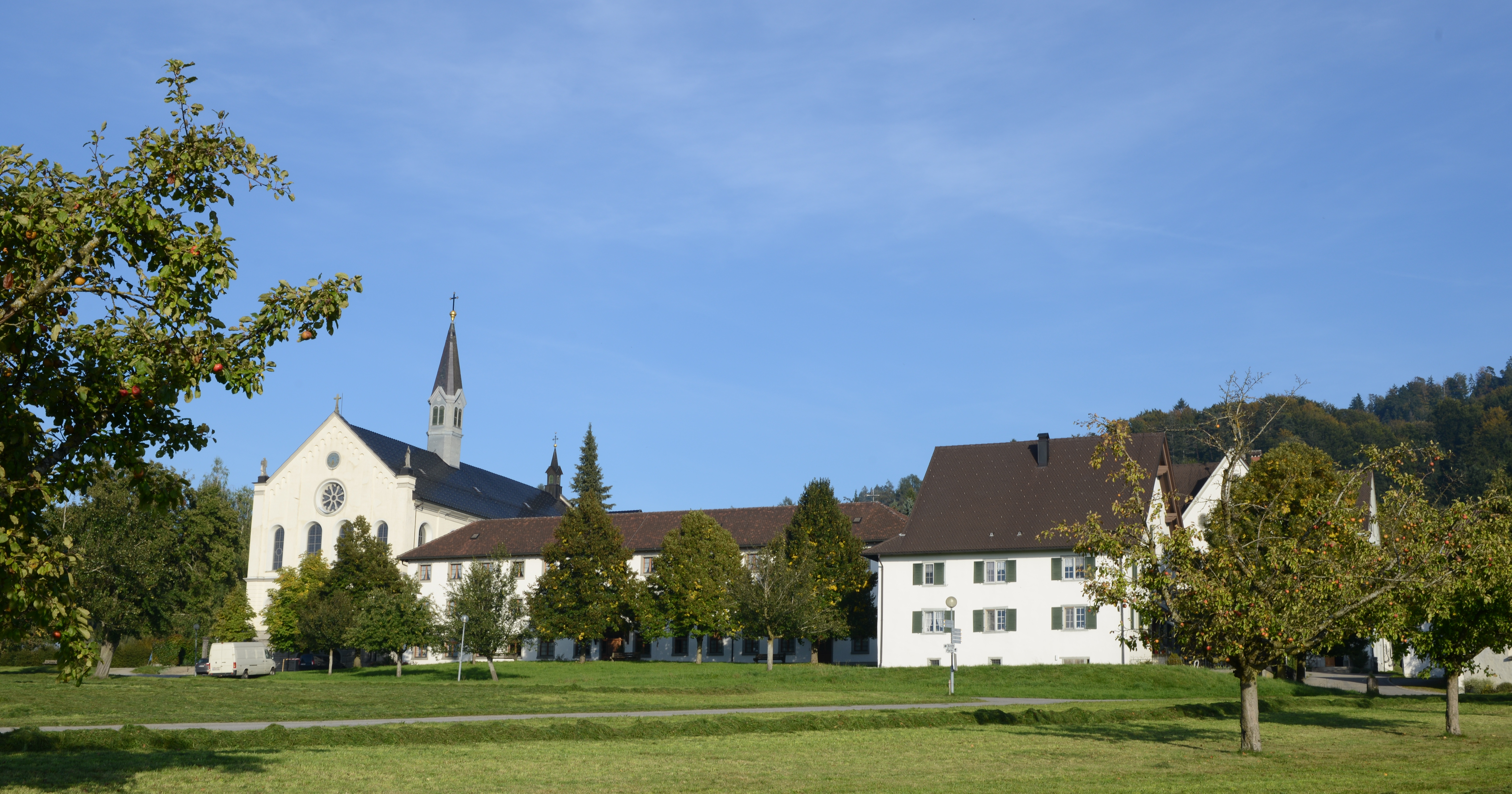
Cistercian abbey Mariastern monastery Maria Stern - Gwiggen in Hohenweiler, Vorarlberg.

Mariastern Abbey is a Cistercian nunnery in Hohenweiler, Austria.

The nunnery was founded in 1856.

It is the mother house of Marienfeld Abbey, founded in 1974. Sister Agnes Fabianek OCist was the abbess at that time.

In 2015, the nunnery had 25 sisters.
