= Roman Catholic Territorial Prelature of Corocoro =

Catholic particular church territory

Territorial Prelature of Corocoro Praelatura Territorialis Corocorensis Prelatura Territorial de Corocoro

Catholic

Location
- Country: Bolivia
- Ecclesiastical province: La Paz
- Metropolitan: La Paz

Statistics
- Area: 28,823 km^{2} (11,129 sq mi)
- Population: Total; Catholics: (as of 2004); 210,894; 190,430 (90.3%)
- Parishes: 28

Information
- Denomination: Roman Catholic
- Rite: Roman Rite
- Established: 25 December 1949 (76 years ago)
- Cathedral: Cathedral in Coro Coro

Current leadership
- Pope: Leo XIV
- Prelate: Pascual Limachi Ortiz
- Metropolitan Archbishop: Edmundo Luis Flavio Abastoflor Montero
- Bishops emeritus: Toribio Ticona Porco

Map

The Territorial Prelature of Corocoro (Latin: Praelatura Territorialis Corocorensis) is a territorial prelature located in the city of Coro Coro in the ecclesiastical province of La Paz in Bolivia.

== History ==
- December 25, 1949: Established as Territorial Prelature of Corocoro from the Metropolitan Archdiocese of La Paz

== Prelates of Corocoro ==
1. Ubaldo Evaristo Cibrián Fernández, C.P. (1953–1965)
2. Jesús Agustín López de Lama, C.P. (1966–1991)
3. Toribio Ticona Porco (1992–2012), elevated to Cardinal in 2018
4. Percy Lorenzo Galvan Flores (2013–2020), appointed as Archbishop of La Paz in May 2020
5. Pascual Limachi Ortiz (2021–present)

== See also ==
- Roman Catholicism in Bolivia
