= Diocese of Argyll and the Isles (Catholic) =

Latin Catholic diocese in Scotland

Coordinates: 56°25′N 5°28′W

Diocese of Argyll and the Isles Dioecesis Ergadiensis et Insularum Sgìre-easbaig Earraghàidheal 's nan Eilean (Scottish Gaelic)

Catholic

Location
- Country: Scotland
- Territory: Most of Argyll and Bute, southern part of Highland, and Outer Hebrides, plus the Isle of Arran
- Ecclesiastical province: St Andrews and Edinburgh
- Metropolitan: St Andrews and Edinburgh

Statistics
- Area: 31,080 km^{2} (12,000 sq mi)
- Population: Total; Catholics: (as of 2015); 74,546; 10,660 (14.3%)
- Parishes: 25

Information
- Denomination: Catholic
- Rite: Roman Rite
- Established: 4 March 1878
- Cathedral: St Columba's Cathedral, Oban
- Secular priests: 29

Current leadership
- Pope: Leo XIV
- Bishop: Brian McGee
- Metropolitan Archbishop: Leo Cushley
- Episcopal Vicars: James L. Canon MacNeil; Donald J. Canon MacKay; John P. Mackinnon

Website
- www.rcdai.org.uk

The Diocese of Argyll and the Isles (Latin: Diocesis Ergadiensis et Insularum) is a Latin Church ecclesiastical territory or diocese of the Catholic Church in Scotland, in the Province of Saint Andrews and Edinburgh.

== Overview ==
The diocese covers an area of 31,080 km² and has a Catholic population of 10,546 (14.1%) out of a total population of 74,546 (2006 figures). The see is in the town of Oban where the seat is located at St Columba's Cathedral.

== History ==
The diocese was erected on 5 March 1878 following the restoration of the Scottish Catholic hierarchy. On 28 December 2015 Pope Francis appointed Father Brian McGee to succeed the Right Reverend Joseph Toal as eleventh Bishop of Argyll and the Isles.

=== Timeline ===
After its establishment in 1878, the seat of the diocese was in various buildings each overlapping the same site:

- 5 March 1878: The Scottish Catholic hierarchy is restored and the Diocese of Argyll and the Isles is erected. There was no cathedral, and the bishop resided in, what became, the Cathedral House. It was bought from the Society of Jesus who previously used it as a summer retreat house.
- Early 1880s: A wooden building served as the pro-cathedral for the diocese. It was located on the site of the Cathedral Hall.
- 1886: A church made of corrugated iron became the pro-cathedral. It was known as the 'Tin Cathedral' and was given to the diocese by the Marquess of Bute.
- 1919: Bishop Donald Martin decided to build a permanent cathedral.
- 14 September 1932: The foundation stone of St Columba's Cathedral was laid.
- 29 October 1933: The 'Tin Cathedral' was demolished to allow space for the cathedral to be finished. Worship continued in the Cathedral Hall.
- 25 December 1934: The cathedral was opened.

== Deaneries and parishes ==
The diocese is organised into three deaneries each with several parishes:

- St Andrew's Deanery

Dean: Fr Michael Hutson

  - Parishes
- St Columba's Cathedral, Oban
- The Visitation, Taynuilt
- St Andrew, Rothesay
- St Margaret, Lochgilphead
- St Mun, Dunoon
- St Kieran, Campbeltown
- Holy Cross, Brodick
- St Margaret's Deanery

Dean: Fr Roddy McAuley

  - Parishes:
- St Mary, Arisaig
- St Margaret, Roybridge
- Our Lady of the Assumption, Portree
- Our Lady of the Angels, Mingarry
- St Mun, Ballachulish
- St Mary, Fort William
- St John's, Caol
- Our Lady of the Rosary and St Columba, Kingussie
- St Mary & St Finnan, Glenfinnan
- Our Lady of Perpetual Succour & St Cumin, Morar
- St Michael's Deanery

Dean: Fr Michael MacDonald

  - Parishes:
- Our Holy Redeemer, Stornoway
- St Barr, Northbay
- St Michael, Eriskay
- St Peter, Daliburgh
- Our Lady, Star of the Sea, Castlebay
- St Mary, Bornish
- St Mary, Benbecula
- St Michael, Ardkenneth

== Education ==
There are Catholic primary schools in Rothesay, Oban, Dunoon and Fort William.

== Bishops ==
=== Past and present ordinaries ===
The following is a list of the Bishops of Argyll and the Isles:

- Angus MacDonald (appointed 22 March 1878 – translated to the Archdiocese of St Andrews and Edinburgh on 15 July 1892)
- George John Smith (appointed 31 December 1892 – died 18 January 1918)
- Donald Martin (appointed 2 April 1919 – died 6 December 1938)
- Donald Alphonsus Campbell (appointed 5 October 1939 – translated to the Archdiocese of Glasgow on 6 January 1945)
- Kenneth Grant (appointed 15 December 1945 – died 7 September 1959)
- Stephen McGill, P.S.S. (appointed 4 April 1960 – translated to the Diocese of Paisley 25 July 1968)
- Colin Aloysius MacPherson (appointed 2 December 1968 – died 24 March 1990)
- Roderick Wright (appointed 11 December 1990 – resigned 19 September 1996)
- (Keith O'Brien, appointed apostolic administrator June 1996 – resigned October 1999)
- Ian Murray (appointed 3 November 1999 – retired 16 October 2008)
- Joseph Anthony Toal (appointed 16 October 2008 - translated to Diocese of Motherwell 23 June 2014)
- sede vacante (23 June 2014 – 28 December 2015)
- Brian McGee (appointed 28 December 2015)

=== Coadjutor Bishop ===
- Ewen (Hugh) Cameron (1917), did not take effect

== See also ==
- Catholic Church in Scotland
- Diocese of Argyll and The Isles (Episcopal)
