= Keith O'Brien =

Scottish Catholic cardinal (1938–2018)

His Eminence Keith O'Brien
- Cardinal; Archbishop emeritus of St Andrews and Edinburgh
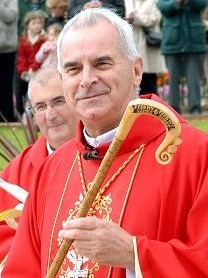
- O'Brien in 2007
- Archdiocese: St Andrews and Edinburgh
- Appointed: 30 May 1985
- Installed: 5 August 1985
- Term ended: 25 February 2013
- Predecessor: Gordon Gray
- Successor: Leo Cushley
- Other post: Cardinal-Priest of SS Gioacchino ed Anna al Tuscolano (2003–2018)
- Previous post: Apostolic Administrator of Argyll and The Isles, Scotland (1996–1999)

Orders
- Ordination: 3 April 1965 by Gordon Gray
- Consecration: 5 August 1985 by Gordon Gray
- Created cardinal: 21 October 2003 by Pope John Paul II
- Rank: Cardinal-priest

Personal details
- Born: Keith Michael Patrick O'Brien; 17 March 1938 Ballycastle, County Antrim, Northern Ireland
- Died: 19 March 2018 (aged 80) Newcastle upon Tyne, Tyne and Wear, England
- Denomination: Catholic
- Education: University of Edinburgh
- Motto: Serve the Lord with gladness
- Coat of arms: Keith O'Brien's coat of arms

Keith Michael Patrick O'Brien (17 March 1938 – 19 March 2018) was a senior-ranking Catholic prelate in Scotland. He was the Archbishop of Saint Andrews and Edinburgh from 1985 to 2013.

O'Brien was the leader of the Catholic Church in Scotland and had been the head of its conference of bishops until he stepped down as archbishop in February 2013. O'Brien's resignation followed publication of allegations that he had engaged in inappropriate and predatory sexual conduct with priests and seminarians under his jurisdiction and abused his power. O'Brien was opposed to homosexuality, which he described as "moral degradation", and a vehement opponent of same-sex marriage.

On 20 March 2015, the Vatican announced that though he remained a member of the College of Cardinals, O'Brien would not exercise his rights or duties as a cardinal, in particular voting in papal conclaves; he had excused himself from participating in the 2013 conclave. O'Brien died after a fall, aged 80, on 19 March 2018.

== Early life and education ==
O'Brien was born at Ballycastle, in County Antrim, Northern Ireland, on St. Patrick's Day, 17 March 1938. After primary education in Ballycastle, his family moved to Scotland where his father was serving with the Royal Navy at Faslane. O'Brien initially attended St Stephen's Primary School, Dalmuir, before continuing to secondary school at St Patrick's High School, Dumbarton. His family then moved to Edinburgh, where he completed his secondary education at Holy Cross Academy.

O'Brien studied at the University of Edinburgh where he gained a Bachelor of Science degree in chemistry in 1959 (and a Diploma in Education in 1966). His studies for the priesthood were at St Andrew's College, Drygrange, Roxburghshire, and he was ordained priest on 3 April 1965 by his predecessor, Cardinal Gordon Gray. Initially serving as curate at Holy Cross, Edinburgh from 1965 until 1966, he completed his teacher training certificate at Moray House College of Education. From 1966 to 1971, he was employed by Fife County Council as a teacher of mathematics and science; he also served as chaplain to St Columba's Secondary School, initially in Cowdenbeath and then in Dunfermline, while assisting at St Bride's Parish, Cowdenbeath.

O'Brien was then moved to full-time parish apostolate in St Patrick's, Kilsyth from 1972 until 1975 and then St Mary's, Bathgate from 1975 until 1978. He served as spiritual director to the students at St Andrew's College, Drygrange from 1978 until 1980; then as Rector of St Mary's College, Blairs, the junior seminary near Aberdeen, from 1980 until 1985.

== Archbishop and cardinal ==
O'Brien was nominated Archbishop of St Andrews and Edinburgh on 30 May 1985 and was consecrated by Gray, then Archbishop Emeritus of St Andrews and Edinburgh, at St Mary's Cathedral, Edinburgh on 5 August 1985.

Pope John Paul II created him Cardinal-Priest of Ss Joachim and Anne ad Tusculanum on 21 October 2003.

O'Brien was made Bailiff Grand Cross of Honour and Devotion of the Sovereign Military Order of Malta in 2005, appointed Grand Prior of the Scottish Lieutenancy of the Equestrian Order of the Holy Sepulchre of Jerusalem in 2001 and appointed Knight Grand Cross (KGCHS) of that order in 2003.

In 2004, O'Brien was awarded an honorary Doctor of Laws degree from St Francis Xavier University, Antigonish, Nova Scotia, Canada, an honorary Doctor of Divinity degree from the University of St Andrews, and an honorary Doctor of Divinity degree from the University of Edinburgh. In 2015 there were calls for the honorary degree from St Andrews to be revoked due to admission of sexual impropriety. Professor Manfredi La Manna wrote, "I, for one, would not recognise as a colleague someone who admitted abusing his position of power for sexual gratification with subordinates." The university decided against this, noting, "(...) that revocation cannot change or ameliorate the wrongs of the past and that, notwithstanding the very real hurt and loss caused by the actions of the honorand, it would be no more than an empty gesture."

Coat of Arms of O'Brien as a Cardinal (while also in post as a Bishop or Archbishop)

O'Brien was Apostolic Administrator of the Diocese of Argyll and the Isles from 1996 until 1999, when Bishop Ian Murray took over the diocese. O'Brien took part in the 2005 Papal Conclave which elected Pope Benedict XVI. In anticipation of the 2010 visit of Pope Benedict to England and Scotland, O'Brien and Vincent Nichols, Archbishop of Westminster, said that the crisis involving Cardinal Seán Brady, Archbishop of Armagh, over the priest Brendan Smyth and other clerical abuse charges was one for the Irish Catholic Church and should not overshadow Benedict's visit. O'Brien and Nichols were asked whether the pope would respond to charges made against the church about clerical sex abuse during his four-day visit, the first papal visit to the UK since John Paul II in 1982. O'Brien said he did not know; Nichols said English, Welsh and Scottish bishops had "robust" rules in place to protect children. Campaigners for victims of abuse wanted an investigation of the way O'Brien dealt with all allegations of abuse while he was leader due to O'Brien's sexual misconduct admission. Mario Conti, Archbishop emeritus of Glasgow, said all the Scottish Catholic bishops except O'Brien cooperated over an independent inquiry into the handling of child abuse in Scotland between 1952 and 2012 with the results to be published. The inquiry was delayed because O'Brien and only O'Brien withdrew cooperation.

When O'Brien announced on 25 February 2013 that Pope Benedict had accepted his resignation as archbishop, he said he would not exercise his right to participate in the conclave in March to elect Benedict's successor. On 20 March 2015, Pope Francis accepted O'Brien's renunciation of all duties as cardinal, an event extremely rare in Church history. Though he remained a cardinal until his death in 2018, he no longer participated in any public, religious or civil events.

=== Curial appointments ===
After his creation as cardinal, O'Brien was appointed a member of the Pontifical Council for Social Communications and also a member of the Pontifical Council for the Pastoral Care of Migrants and Itinerant People. He was President of the Bishops' Conference of Scotland and fulfilled various engagements at the request of other members of the Conference. He was sometimes referred to as the "Primate of Scotland"; however, this title or position has never existed.

=== Resignation as archbishop ===
O'Brien tendered his resignation from the governance of the Archdiocese of St Andrews and Edinburgh to the Pope some time in 2012, in view of his 75th birthday in March 2013; the Pope accepted it nunc pro tunc on 13 November 2012 and decided it would become effective on 25 February 2013. He remained a cardinal. The announcement of his resignation followed allegations initially in The Observer newspaper that O'Brien had engaged in inappropriate sexual conduct with junior clergy. The Pope appointed Philip Tartaglia as temporary apostolic administrator in O'Brien's place. In July, Leo Cushley, a priest from Motherwell, was named to succeed O'Brien as archbishop.

== Sexual misconduct and consequences ==
In 2013 allegations became public that O'Brien had engaged in homosexual, inappropriate, sometimes predatory sexual activity from the 1980s to 2003.

=== Accusations and admission ===
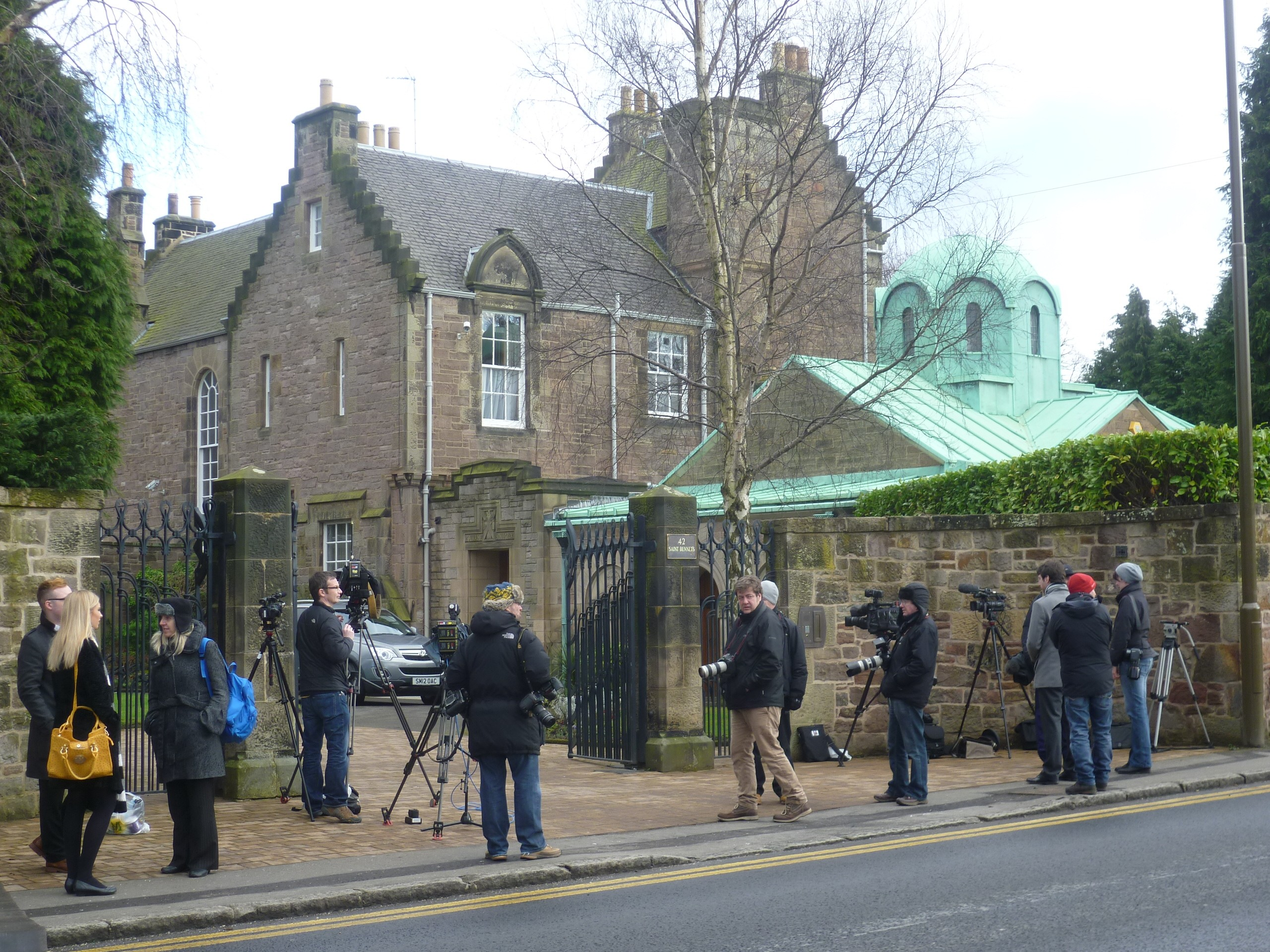
Reporters outside St Bennets, O'Brien's Edinburgh residence, on the day he resigned

On 23 February 2013, The Observer reported that O'Brien had been accused of inappropriate sexual behaviour involving four men (three serving priests, and one former priest) within the Archdiocese of St Andrews and Edinburgh dating back to the 1980s. The former priest resigned the priesthood when O'Brien became a bishop and stated, "I knew then he would always have power over me. […] I left to preserve my integrity." It was reported that one complainant needed long term counselling due to the actions of O'Brien.

One of the four, referred to only as "Priest C", alleges that the degree of control a superior has over subordinate priests made it hard for him to refuse O'Brien's demands. "He [the bishop above a priest] has immense power over you. He can move you, freeze you out, bring you into the fold [...] he controls every aspect of your life."

The complaint demanding O'Brien's immediate resignation was lodged with the Vatican's ambassador to the United Kingdom and there were efforts to silence at least one critic.

O'Brien initially contested the allegations. According to the BBC, a source within the church said that O'Brien "doesn't know who his accusers are and doesn't know what they're accusing him of". On 24 February 2013 he did not attend a special service to celebrate the eight-year tenure of Pope Benedict XVI at St Mary's Cathedral, Edinburgh. It was widely reported that he had asked for legal advice and been advised not to attend. On 25 February 2013 it was announced that O'Brien's previously submitted resignation as archbishop would take effect that same day, and a temporary apostolic administrator was appointed in his place. O'Brien said that he would not participate in the oncoming conclave, although entitled to do so. O'Brien then made no further public appearance until early May 2013.

On 3 March 2013, the Scottish Catholic Media Office released a statement from O'Brien in which he said, "I [...] admit that there have been times that my sexual conduct has fallen below the standards expected of me as a priest, archbishop and cardinal." He said he intended to retire permanently from the public life of the church. Archbishop Philip Tartaglia, temporary successor to O'Brien, said the "credibility and moral authority" of the church had been damaged.

The same month, a former priest announced his intention to sue O'Brien, saying O'Brien had groped and kissed him as a 19-year-old seminarian in the 1980s. One of the four whistleblowers who testified against O'Brien in 2013, Brian Devlin, who later left the priesthood, in 2021 waived anonymity to publish a book, Cardinal Sin, about his experiences and his fight for improved church governance and accountability. Devlin asserts that O'Brien's misconduct was well known internally before the four made public allegations. He stated, "People go with sincere feelings to their bishop and he doesn't respond. It's indescribably bad and has nothing to do with Christianity. They still hurt and control people and I demand my freedom to say, 'Stop this. Stop your cruelty.'"

O'Brien was further accused of trying to grope a priest in 2003 in Rome at a drinks party to celebrate his becoming a cardinal. It was also alleged that O'Brien had been in a long-term physical relationship with one of the complainants.

O'Brien faced allegations of a "culture of cronyism" within his archdiocese, and that this made him less likely to challenge priests to whom he had made advances.

In 2015, The Glasgow Herald reported allegations that in at least 40 cases young clerics were encouraged to let O'Brien hear their confessions, and the religious act was used for sexual grooming. There was allegedly reluctance to accept O'Brien's actions as a sexual predator. Victims of O'Brien's sexual abuse felt unable to complain because within the Church, only a pope has ever been able to discipline a cardinal. After publication of the McLellan Report in 2015, the Church of Scotland minister Andrew McLellan said the church's treatment of O'Brien showed that secrecy is still an "important part of the atmosphere" within the church.

=== Ecclesiastical response ===
On 27 April 2013, The Scotsman reported that Cardinal Marc Ouellet would head an investigation into O'Brien, and that appointment of Scottish bishops had been halted until the inquiry was completed. This contradicted another report suggesting that the Vatican would not hold a formal investigation or publish any formal report because "The Church doesn't work that way." No decision had been made to demote or laicise O'Brien.

O'Brien returned to Scotland and attempted to settle into the church-owned cottage he had planned as his retirement home in Dunbar, East Lothian. One of his accusers, a former seminarian, stated, "Keith O'Brien is giving the impression he wants a nice peaceful little retirement now. My experience hasn't left me for decades and as far as I'm concerned this brings things very much back into focus. I have an issue with Keith O'Brien and it needs to be dealt with." There were fears the cardinal's visibility would harm the church further. On 15 March 2013, it was confirmed that the Vatican had ordered O'Brien to leave Scotland, and he left for months of "prayer and penance". According to The Washington Post, "The statement did not specify that the decision was imposed on O'Brien by the Vatican as punishment, and in fact suggested that the decision was O'Brien's. But in the past, wayward priests have been sanctioned by the Vatican with punishments of 'prayer and penance', and the statement made clear Francis supported the move and that the Holy See would decide his future fate."

The Vatican stated on 15 May 2013 that O'Brien "will be leaving Scotland for several months for the purpose of spiritual renewal, prayer and penance" and "Any decision regarding future arrangements for His Eminence [Cardinal Keith O'Brien] shall be agreed with the Holy See."

Supporters of O'Brien objected to the church requiring O'Brien to leave Scotland; John Canon Creanor threatened legal action to prevent O'Brien's "forced exile", and said he had a legal team ready. Richard Holloway, former Bishop of Edinburgh in the Scottish Episcopal Church, said that forcing O'Brien into exile from Scotland would breach international law. Holloway likened O'Brien's forced exile to the tactics of "extraordinary rendition" (extrajudicial transfer) of the US Central Intelligence Agency (CIA).

The four complainants said that O'Brien needed psychological counselling rather than prayer and penance. One accusing priest said, "Keith is extremely manipulative and needs help to be challenged out of his denial. If he does not receive treatment, I believe he is still a danger to himself and to others." The four accusers believed there was a smokescreen, with the full story untold, and wanted an investigation to reveal the extent of O'Brien's actions.

Authorities within the Catholic Church in Scotland were unable to take formal disciplinary action against O’Brien. As of July 2013, O'Brien was still Britain's most senior Catholic. According to Peter Kearney, the director of communications of the Catholic media office (which was largely unavailable for official comment), only Rome could handle the O'Brien affair; nobody in Scotland had authority to challenge a cardinal.

According to Catherine Deveney writing in The Observer, Archbishop Tartaglia, who was temporary leader of St Andrews and Edinburgh following O'Brien's resignation, failed to confront the issue, and behind the scenes "church insiders" were critical; one told her that "He is completely lacking in leadership qualities". Kearney told The Observer there could be no Scottish investigation because the nuncio had rightly not identified the complainants. However, this was not the case; Kearney apparently did not know that Joseph Toal, Bishop of Argyll and the Isles, had been given names and asked to be a contact point.

Deveney said that this issue was no longer about personal failure, but systemic failure, and reported that theologian Werner Jeanrond said "As a church, we have failed to come to terms with homosexuality. The highest clerical representative of the church is himself a victim of the system which didn't allow him to own his homosexuality." She added that there are many other scandals involving Scottish clergy, including at least one bishop; misdeeds include sexual misconduct, heavy drinking, payoffs to cover scandals and serious abuse; and she said that "O'Brien knows where the bodies lie. And the hierarchy knows he knows." She said that the issue was not about Scottish clergy, but was worldwide.

In July 2013 O'Brien was reported to be in a monastery in Europe or an enclosed abbey in the English Midlands. In November 2013 there was a report that O'Brien would face no further punishment, which disappointed alleged victims and victims' groups.

==== Apostolic visitation ====
After some delay, it was reported in The Observer on 23 June 2013 that the Vatican had decided to hold an apostolic visitation. This is a formal high-level inspection into the affair, in which the "visitator" is given authority directly by the pope. In this case the visitator was the archbishop of St Andrews and Edinburgh, who had not yet been appointed at the time. Papal nuncio Antonio Mennini told one of the complainants, a former priest known as "Lenny", of the decision. Anyone affected would be able to give evidence; if there was considered to be sufficient evidence, a deeper process would take place in Rome. Lenny was relieved that the facts would finally be examined, but said that the visitation also had to examine "whether any promotions were awarded to the cardinal's cronies".

According to the article, senior figures in Rome said the visitation would also deal with the more general accusations of moral failings in the church in Scotland. There was criticism of the choice of O'Brien's successor as Archbishop of Edinburgh as visitator; Tom Doyle, a canon lawyer who had worked at the nunciature in Washington and later represented Catholic abuse victims all over the world, said that the whole point was for someone from outside to investigate, and that the choice of O'Brien's successor would make the church "look like fools". Doyle said that dealing with a previous case, which related to widespread child abuse in Ireland, by an apostolic visitation had been a "total farce", and that only totally independent investigations have elicited significant truth in similar cases, as with (non-ecclesiastical) grand juries in the United States and government statutory commissions in Ireland.

The complainants have been negotiating with Archbishop Leo Cushley but have also appealed to Pope Francis. They would like an investigation into the way the diocese was governed, the manner of O'Brien's appointment, whether close associates were appointed to positions of power and also the extent of O'Brien's predatory behaviour. Cushley promised to hand over the requests personally but discouraged public discussion of the case. During O'Brien's lifetime a Canonical trial remained possible but unlikely. "Lenny" claims the finances of the Archdiocese of St Andrews and Edinburgh under O'Brien are being investigated internally to find if there were irregularities. If this were not done he would have involved the charity regulator. He says O'Brien bought a jet ski for a friend and the source of the money is unclear. The church has neither confirmed nor denied this.

O'Brien had since January 2014 been living, initially incognito, in a home provided by the Catholic Church in the village of Ellington, Northumberland, fifty miles south of the Scottish border. O'Brien later moved to Newcastle on Tyne.

Charles Scicluna investigated O'Brien in April 2014 and such an investigation of a cardinal appears unprecedented. There are concerns that the report, allegedly "hot enough to burn the varnish" from the Pope's desk, remains unpublished.

Following Scicluna's apostolic visitation, the Holy See announced on 20 March 2015 that Pope Francis had "accept[ed] the resignation of Cardinal Keith Patrick O'Brien from the rights and duties of a Cardinal". A statement for the Catholic Church in Scotland confirmed that O'Brien would continue to live outside Scotland until such time as his age and infirmity required that situation to be reviewed. He retained the title of Cardinal, but did not any longer carry out the functions of a cardinal and was only allowed to wear a cardinal's robes in private. According to the Holy See Press Office O'Brien would not take part in papal elections, act as papal adviser, or take part in Vatican congregations and councils, and would lose other roles of a cardinal. Journalist David Gibson wrote that "Those developments, [Scicluna's unpublished report, the home bought for O'Brien, that O'Brien was not officially punished] plus the fact that O'Brien can keep the title of cardinal ... may also keep the issue on the boil rather than cooling it off." The ecclesiastical historian Christopher Bellitto said, "What's odd, in this papacy especially, is that O'Brien loses the power, but not the pomp, ... a red hat is still a red hat, even if there is no punch behind it."

The Survivors Network of those Abused by Priests is concerned that the transparency Pope Francis promised is absent and the cardinal's wrong or abusive actions have been kept secret. There is further concern that other clerics failed to disclose abuse by O'Brien which they reasonably should have known or suspected. Abusive bishops have resigned in the past, but action against complicit clerics and bishops who conceal abuse would be a helpful innovation because it would help prevent further abuse and concealment.

=== Consequences ===
O'Brien was the first accused Catholic cardinal whose case was dealt with publicly. Richard Sipe, a US former priest working on church abuse, said at the time that O'Brien was not the only case: "We have someone here too. It will go public soon." He was referring to US Cardinal Theodore McCarrick, who was ultimately, unlike O'Brien, stripped of his cardinalate.

The O'Brien case forced accountability and discussion of such cases on the Catholic church, and Rome was forced to create a process. According to O'Brien's victim Keith Devlin, O'Brien's and McCarrick's cases are linked: "If we hadn't gone to the Observer back then, the church would have dealt with McCarrick quite differently. Without O'Brien, there would be no church process."

== Health and death ==
O'Brien said, while criticising a parliamentary bill on embryology in 2008, that he carried an organ donor card. O'Brien suffered from heart problems and was fitted with a pacemaker after complaining of dizzy spells and fainting prior to Passion Sunday Mass in March 2008. Following the acceptance of his resignation in February 2013 he said "Approaching the age of 75 and at times in indifferent health, I tendered my resignation as Archbishop of St Andrews and Edinburgh to Pope Benedict XVI some months ago."

O'Brien died after a fall on 19 March 2018, two days after his 80th birthday.

== Views ==
O'Brien was often forthright in his political and spiritual views. In 1999, at the European Synod of Bishops, O'Brien declared who he saw fit to be the next Archbishop of Westminster, following the death of Cardinal Basil Hume. He named his candidate, Timothy Radcliffe, Master General of the Dominican order (Black Friars). At the synod, Radcliffe had made an appeal to O'Brien, saying that there was a crisis of authority in the church, but the answer could not be more emphasis on authority. In the presence of the Pope, Radcliffe went on: the church should not only speak about the poor, the divorced people, women who had had abortions, homosexuals, but should also take at heart their experiences, eat their bread, take what they had to offer. "They'll blame us being associated with the wrong people but we have a good precedent", with a clear reference to Jesus.

=== Secularism ===
In 2011, he criticised "aggressive secularism", denouncing what he said was the way Christians had been prevented from acting in accordance with their beliefs. O'Brien said aggressive secularism threatened the Christian heritage and he wanted religion to remain in the public sphere. Specifically, legislation requiring Christians to tolerate homosexuality was a type of secularism O'Brien opposed, and he called on Christians of all denominations to unite in combating secularism.

On this topic, The Herald reported that:

"When speaking about equality legislation preventing discrimination against homosexuals, [O'Brien] said that Christians faced being sidelined in British society because they were not willing to publicly endorse lifestyles that run contrary to their belief system."

Per The Guardian, O'Brien's Easter 2011 homily:

"included instances where Christians had fallen foul of equality legislation, preventing discrimination against gay people, and swiftly drew fire from groups campaigning against religious privilege in public life.

Evan Harris of the National Secular Society and the British Humanist Association called O'Brien's statements "paranoid and unjustified".

=== Homosexuality ===
Before becoming a cardinal, O'Brien had been regarded as "liberal" on the issue of homosexuality, saying that there were a significant number of homosexual priests ministering within the Catholic Church. However, in December 2004 he told members of the Scottish Parliament that homosexuals were "captives of sexual aberrations", comparing homosexuals to prisoners in Saughton Prison; and later referred to homosexuality as a "moral degradation". But in 2005 O'Brien did rebuke Bishop Joseph Devine, who had suggested that homosexuals should not be allowed to teach in Catholic schools, commenting, "I don't have a problem with the personal life of a person as long as they are not flaunting their sexuality."

In January 2006 he criticised Westminster MPs over the introduction of civil partnerships in the UK, and Holyrood members over the liberalisation of divorce laws in Scotland. In July 2006 he opposed proposals to change the law which would require Catholic adoption agencies to place children with homosexuals in the same way as with heterosexuals, calling them totalitarian.

In December 2011, O'Brien reiterated the Catholic Church's continued opposition to civil partnerships and suggested that there should be no laws that "facilitate" same-sex relationships, saying that

The empirical evidence is clear, same-sex relationships are demonstrably harmful to the medical, emotional and spiritual well being of those involved, no compassionate society should ever enact legislation to facilitate or promote such relationships, we have failed those who struggle with same-sex attraction and wider society by our actions.

In 2012, O'Brien criticised in The Daily Telegraph government proposals to introduce same-sex marriage, saying it was "madness", and would "redefine society since the institution of marriage is one of the fundamental building blocks of society", and thus shame the United Kingdom. Conservative MP Margot James, who was considered one of the most influential gay women in 2009, called these comments "scaremongering" and said: "I think it is a completely unacceptable way for a prelate to talk. I think that the government is not trying to force Catholic churches to perform gay marriages at all. It is a purely civil matter." The Deputy Leader of the Labour Party, Harriet Harman, said: "We have had prejudice, discrimination and homophobia for hundreds of years. That doesn't make it right. ... I don't want anybody to feel that this is a licence for whipping up prejudice." Dan Hodges wrote: "I can't remember the last time I read a more morally and intellectually bankrupt rant from a senior member of the clergy."

The LGBT rights campaigners Stonewall awarded O'Brien "Bigot of the Year" at their annual awards in 2012. The award was criticised by First Minister of Scotland, Alex Salmond, as being "clearly wrong" and "not conducive to a proper and dignified debate on the important issue of equality in Scotland".

=== Clerical celibacy ===
On 22 February 2013, in an interview with the BBC, O'Brien said he was open to the possibility of removing the requirement of celibacy in the priesthood.

=== Abortion and embryo research ===
In May 2007 O'Brien urged Roman Catholics to reject political candidates who support what he called the "social evil" of abortion, and said that such Catholic politicians should not expect to remain full members of the church.

During March 2008, O'Brien highlighted the issue of the Human Fertilisation and Embryology Bill being debated in Parliament, denouncing the government for a "monstrous attack on human rights" through its "evil" endorsement of "Frankenstein" experiments. Some scientists suggested that he intentionally used inflammatory language to stir up opposition to the bill; others argued he was sticking up for morals and forced the Government to allow MPs to vote freely on the issue. (Gordon Brown had originally imposed a three-line whip on Labour MPs, meaning they had to back the bill, regardless of personal convictions.)

O'Brien himself narrated a five-minute video recording in which he stated the "many, many concerns" of the Catholic Church concerning the bill which was to be voted on in Parliament. It was posted on YouTube, and sent as a DVD to every member of Parliament. In the video O'Brien made clear he was not against medical research, and supported research with non-embryonic stem cells, but was opposed to using embryos which would later be destroyed. He expressed the church's concerns over "human-animal hybrids".

=== British politics ===
In February 2010, the Secretary of State for Scotland, Jim Murphy, said in the House of Commons that faith was "at the very foundations of the Labour Party" and encouraged openness to religion in public life. O'Brien responded that he "welcomed the sentiment" but said that "a tangible example by the Government over the last decade that it acknowledged or endorsed religious values would also have been welcomed. Instead we have witnessed this Government undertake a systematic and unrelenting attack on family values." O'Brien said to the Leader of the Scottish Labour Party, Iain Gray, "I hope he [Pope Benedict XVI] gives you hell [during his September 2010 visit] for what has happened over the past 10 years."

In March 2011, O'Brien called British foreign policy "anti-Christian" for greatly increasing aid to Pakistan without requiring any commitment from the Pakistani government to religious freedom for Christians and other religious minority groups. He made this statement in the wake of the assassination of Pakistani minister Shahbaz Bhatti, who had spoken out against the country's blasphemy law.

==== British monarchy ====
O'Brien called for a 310-year-old law banning Catholics from taking the throne to be repealed. He said the Act of Settlement of 1701 was hampering efforts to curb sectarianism. Former Prime Minister David Cameron said that "in principle" he supported reforming the law on royal succession to remove the ban on Catholics, and people married to Catholics, from ascending the throne. Following the 2011 Perth Agreement, the Succession to the Crown Act 2013 actually discontinued disqualification of those whose consort is a Catholic from the possibility of inheriting the throne.

==== Scottish independence ====
In an interview with the University of St Andrews philosopher John Haldane, published in the Catholic Herald in October 2006, O'Brien stated that he would be "happy" if Scots voted for independence and predicted that independence is coming "before too long". He drew parallels with the independence of the Roman Catholic Church in Scotland: "it is difficult to argue that ecclesiastical independence is acceptable but political independence is not".

==== Poverty ====
In 2011, O'Brien preached a homily including the quote below.

Travelling around our own Archdiocese and visiting schools, primary or secondary basically every week I realise that there are more and more children needing a nourishing meal provided by the State each day and this is accomplished throughout schools with the help of the State. No one can say that unemployment is no longer with us – rather at times it seems to be increasing. Further with the present economic recession biting harder and harder the needs of our people have become increasingly difficult to satisfy and it is not just the "poorest of the poor" who have to be helped by the St Vincent de Paul Society but rather people who might have considered themselves rather well off. In previous years it might have been relatively easy to recognise the signs of poverty in our community – but that is not quite the same at this present time when not only do the poor become poorer but very often the rich become poor! I would put it to the members of the St Vincent de Paul Society that they should consider how best to answer those calls for alleviation of poverty by an increasing number in our society who previously were and consider themselves "well off" but now find themselves and their families in rather straitened circumstances.

== See also ==
- Homosexual clergy in the Catholic Church

Catholic Church titles
Preceded by Gordon Gray	Archbishop of St Andrews and Edinburgh; 1985–2013	Succeeded by Leo Cushley
Preceded by Hans Hermann Groër	Cardinal Priest of Santi Gioacchino ed Anna al Tuscolano; 2003–2018	Succeeded by Toribio Ticona Porco
