= St Columba's Cathedral =

Coordinates: 56.419184°N 5.479155°W

- St Columba's Cathedral
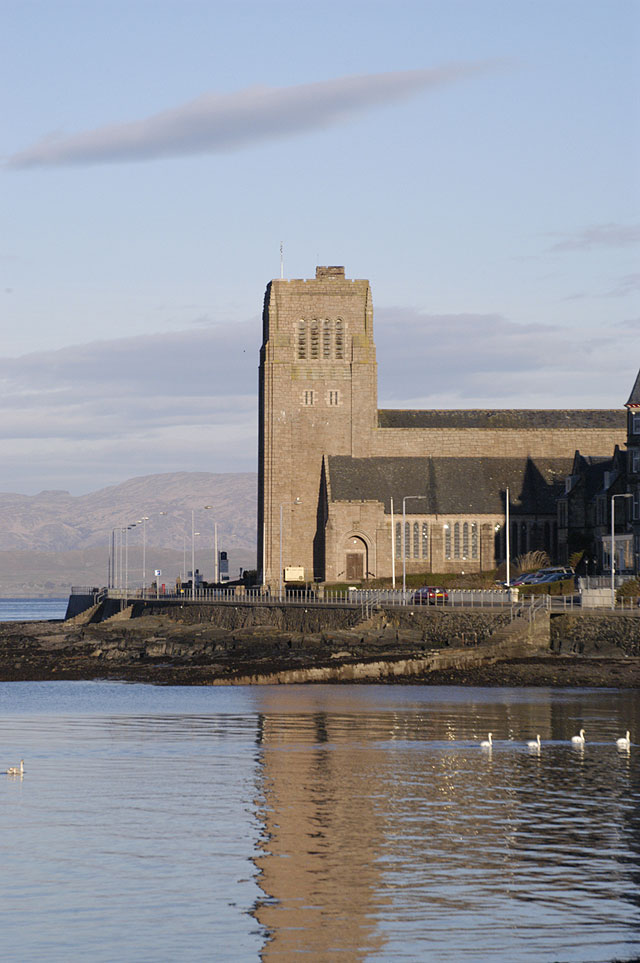
- View across seafront

- Location within Argyll and Bute
- Location: Oban, Argyll and Bute
- Country: Scotland
- Denomination: Roman Catholic
- Website: www.rcdai.org.uk

History
- Dedication: 8 June 2004

Architecture
- Architect: Giles Gilbert Scott
- Style: Gothic Revival
- Years built: 1932–1959

Administration
- Province: St Andrews and Edinburgh
- Diocese: Argyll and the Isles

Clergy
- Archbishop: Most Rev Leo Cushley
- Bishop: Rt Rev Brian McGee

The Cathedral Church of St Columba in Oban is the seat of the Roman Catholic Bishop of Argyll and the Isles and mother church of the Diocese of Argyll and the Isles. The cathedral is located on the sea front at the northern end of Oban.

== History ==
In the Middle Ages the cathedral of the diocese of Argyll was north of Oban on the island of Lismore. Dedicated to St Moluag, Lismore Cathedral is now a Church of Scotland High Kirk.

A temporary structure clad in corrugated iron, known as the 'tin cathedral', was erected in 1886, and furnished by the 3rd Marquess of Bute.

The present cathedral was designed in the Neo-Gothic style by the architect Sir Giles Gilbert Scott, the foundation stone being laid in 1932 and the building completed in 1952. It is a Category A listed building. The work was partially funded by money raised by the diocese in the USA, Canada and Ireland. It is constructed from pink Peterhead and blue Inverawe granite.

The funeral Mass of Frances Shand Kydd, mother of Diana, Princess of Wales, took place there in 2004.

== See also ==
- List of Category A listed buildings in Argyll and Bute
- List of post-war Category A listed buildings in Scotland
