= John Craig (reformer) =

Scottish reformer

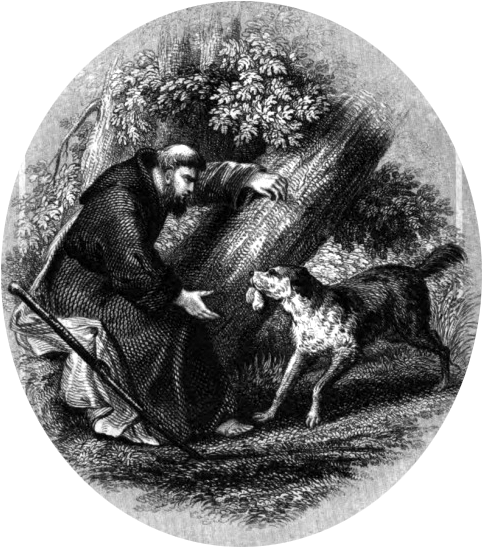
- Church: Church of Scotland

Personal details
- Born: Johnne Craig c. 1512
- Died: 12 December 1600
- Denomination: Presbyterian
- Education: University of St Andrews
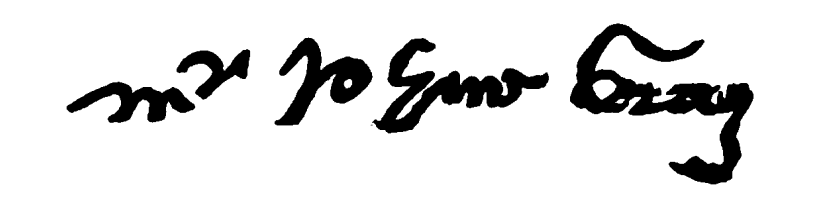
- Signature: John Craig's signature

Minister of Canongate (Holyroodhouse)
- In office 1561 – 2 July 1562

Minister of St. Giles' Cathedral
- In office 2 July 1562 – 1571

Minister of Montrose
- In office 1571 – 6 August 1573

Minister of St Nicolas', Aberdeen
- In office 6 August 1573 – 14 September 1579

Minister of Chapel Royal of Stirling
- In office 14 September 1579 – 12 December 1600

Moderator of the General Assembly of the Church of Scotland
- In office 1 March 1570 – close
- In office 24 October 1576 – close
- In office 17 October 1581 – close

John Craig (c. 1512 – 12 December 1600) was a Reformer, and colleague of John Knox. Originally a Dominican, he became a Church of Scotland minister with significant extra responsibilities and played an influential part in the Scottish Reformation.

Craig was educated at the St. Andrews, and, going afterwards to England, became tutor in the family of Lord Dacre. He entered the order of Dominican Friars at Bologna, where he was appointed Master of Novices and of which he served as rector for several years. His role gave him access to read the Papally-censored works of John Calvin and on reading The Institutes, Craig accepted their teachings. For this he was condemned by the Inquisition and sentenced to be burned for heresy in August, 1559 but escaped from jail at Rome. Returning, via Vienna, to Edinburgh, in 1561, he joined the Reforming party, and was appointed minister of the Canongate that year. In 1562 he became a colleague of John Knox in St Giles, where he worked for nine years.

Craig proclaimed the banns of marriage between Queen Mary and Bothwell, which, however, he declared scandalous. Craig was elected Moderator of the General Assembly for the third time, in 1581. He assisted in compiling the second book of Discipline signed by King James VI, and subsequently censured His Majesty for not dealing justly with his people. An author and hymnwriter, he compiled a very popular catechism known as "Craig's Catechism". Craig died in old age being around 88 years old.

== Early life (1512-1537) ==
John Craig was born about 1512. His father was killed at the Battle of Flodden in 1513, as was the father of John Spottiswood. Craig studied philosophy at the University of St. Andrews and may have witnessed the burnings of Patrick Hamilton and Henry Forrest. After graduating he served as tutor to the children of Lord Dacre for two years in the north of England.

He returned to Scotland and entered the Dominican Order at their priory in St Andrews. Being cleared of a suspicion of heresy, probably after several months detention, he left, in 1537, around aged 23, for England. He had hoped to study at Cambridge with the help of Lord Dacre but was disappointed and then travelled to Rome via France.

== Life in Italy (1537-1560) ==
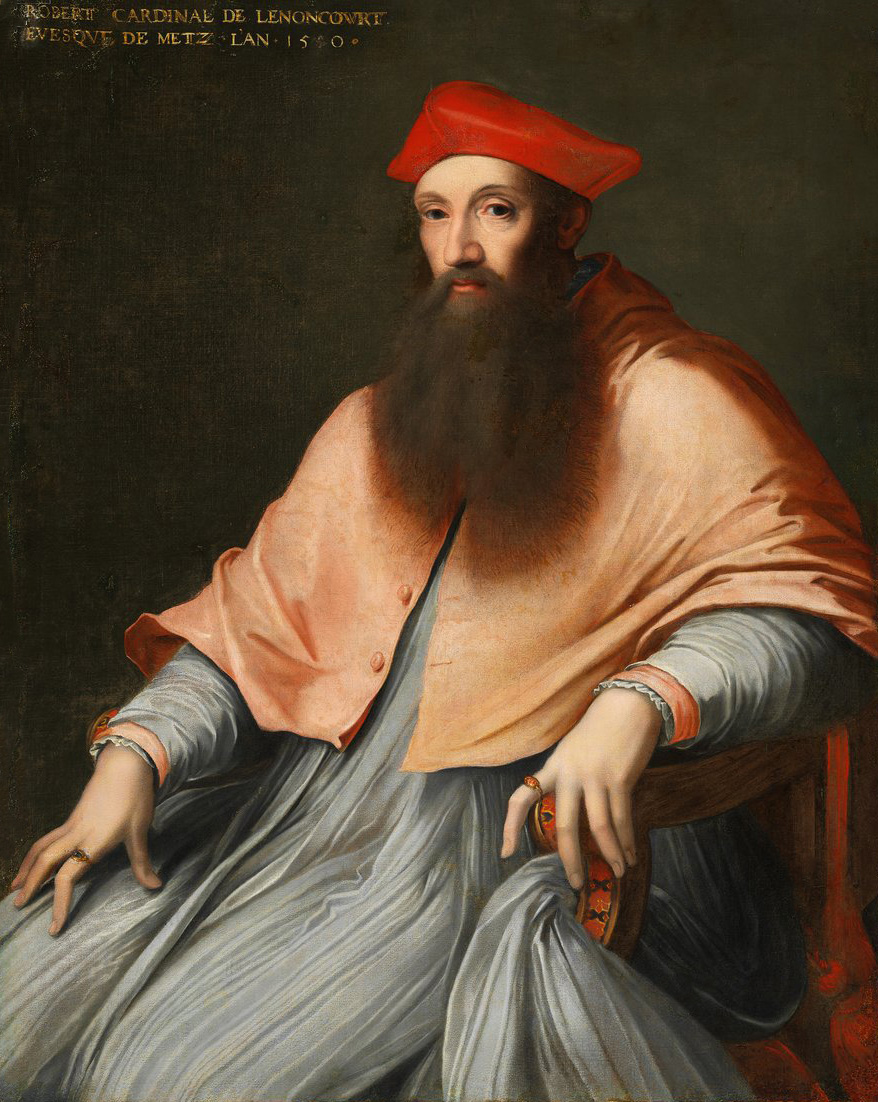
The English Cardinal Reginald Pole, one of the Spirituali; he lost the papal election by one vote. Cardinal Pole's archenemy Cardinal Carafa, who would later become Pope Paul IV, acted to suppress the Spirituali before and after attaining the papacy, and under him many went on trial before the Inquisition.

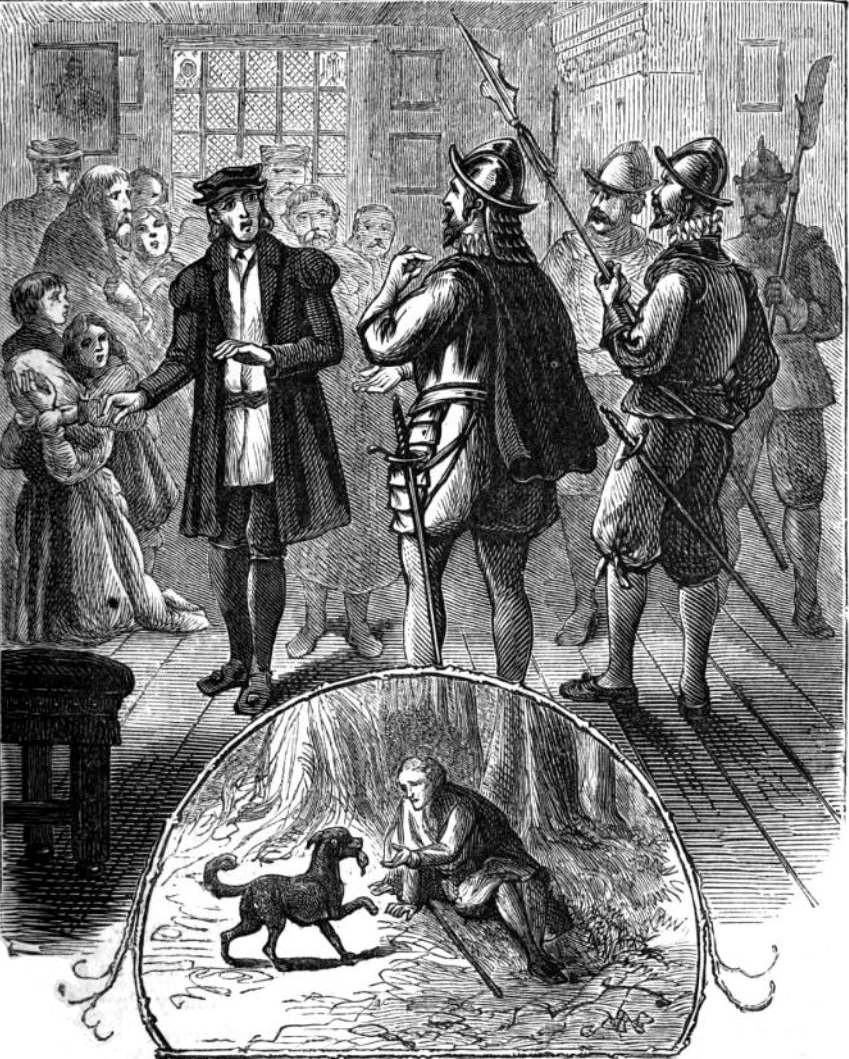
John Craig depicted in 1877

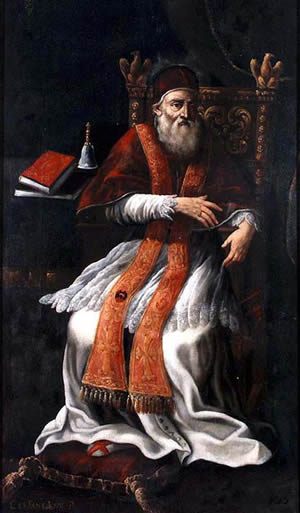
Pope Paul IV. A fellow prisoner at the time was Benjamin Nehemiah ben Elnathan who left an account of his confinement. It has been published under the title Living under the Evil Pope.

Through the influence of Cardinal Pole, Craig obtained a position instructing novices at the Dominican house in Bologna. Hewat says: "There must have been something arresting about this young monk, for it was on the recommendation of one so great and influential as Cardinal Pole that he was admitted to a place among the Dominicans in the city of Bologna, where he soon became Master of the Novices." It has been suggested that John Craig had theological leanings towards the Spirituali. Spottiswoode relates: "Afterwards when they perceived his diligence and dexterity in businesses, he was employed in all their affairs throughout Italy, and sent on commission to Chios, an isle situated in the Ionic Sea, to redress things that were amiss amongst those of their order". Craig became rector or head official of the Dominican College which had links with the university. Ironically, since Dominicans were charged with suppressing ideas judged to be heretical, Craig here had access to the library of the Inquisition holding forbidden books like John Calvin's Institutes and came through his analysis to adopt some of Calvin's views. Craig himself was thus sent to Rome charged as a heretic. Sentenced to be burned on 19 August 1559, Craig escaped the day before during civil unrest prompted by the death of the unpopular Pope Paul IV on 18 August, upon which crowds broke into the prisons to free his captives.

=== The stories of Craig's confinement and the dog ===
There are two accounts, in Row and one in Spottiswoode, of Craig's activities between his arrest and his preaching in Vienna where he is next found. Kerr speculates that Craig may have met the reformer John Row of Perth, the father of his namesake, the historian, in Italy, although Row's history is largely based on the writings of his father-in-law David Ferguson.

Domini Canis? John Craig's dog from the 1883 plaque at St Giles' Cathedral. Critics argued the dog's black colour showed its devilish origin rather than being a sign of God's gracious Providence.

John Howie in the Scots Worthies tells about the dog: "During his travels abroad he was frequently delivered out of very great dangers, by the kind interposition of a gracious Providence: an instance of which we have while he was in Italy. Being obliged to flee out of that country, on account of his regard for the Reformation, in order to avoid being apprehended, he was obliged to lurk in obscure places in the day-time, and travel over night. By this means any little money he had was soon exhausted, and being in the extremity of want, a dog brought a purse to him with some gold in it, by which he was supported until he escaped the danger of being taken." John Hamilton argued "...a black dog gave to him by the way a purse of gold. The colour of the dog may declare whether it was sent by a good spirit or not; for the Holy Spirit descended upon Christ in the likeness of a white dove."

Robert Lippe dismisses these stories saying: "Row adds some additional particulars regarding this imprisonment, such as his being confined in a deep and gloomy vault, where the prisoners had to stand twice a day up to their waists in water by the admission of the tide. These and other additions to Craig's imprisonment and escape, may be safely dismissed as mythical accretions, as we know there are no tides in the Mediterranean, and consequently none at Rome. We need not repeat his providential deliverance, escape, and journey to Vienna, and his reception by the Imperial House there — with all the startling attending circumstances — events which read more like a chapter of a thrilling romance than a plain and sober narrative of an actual life."

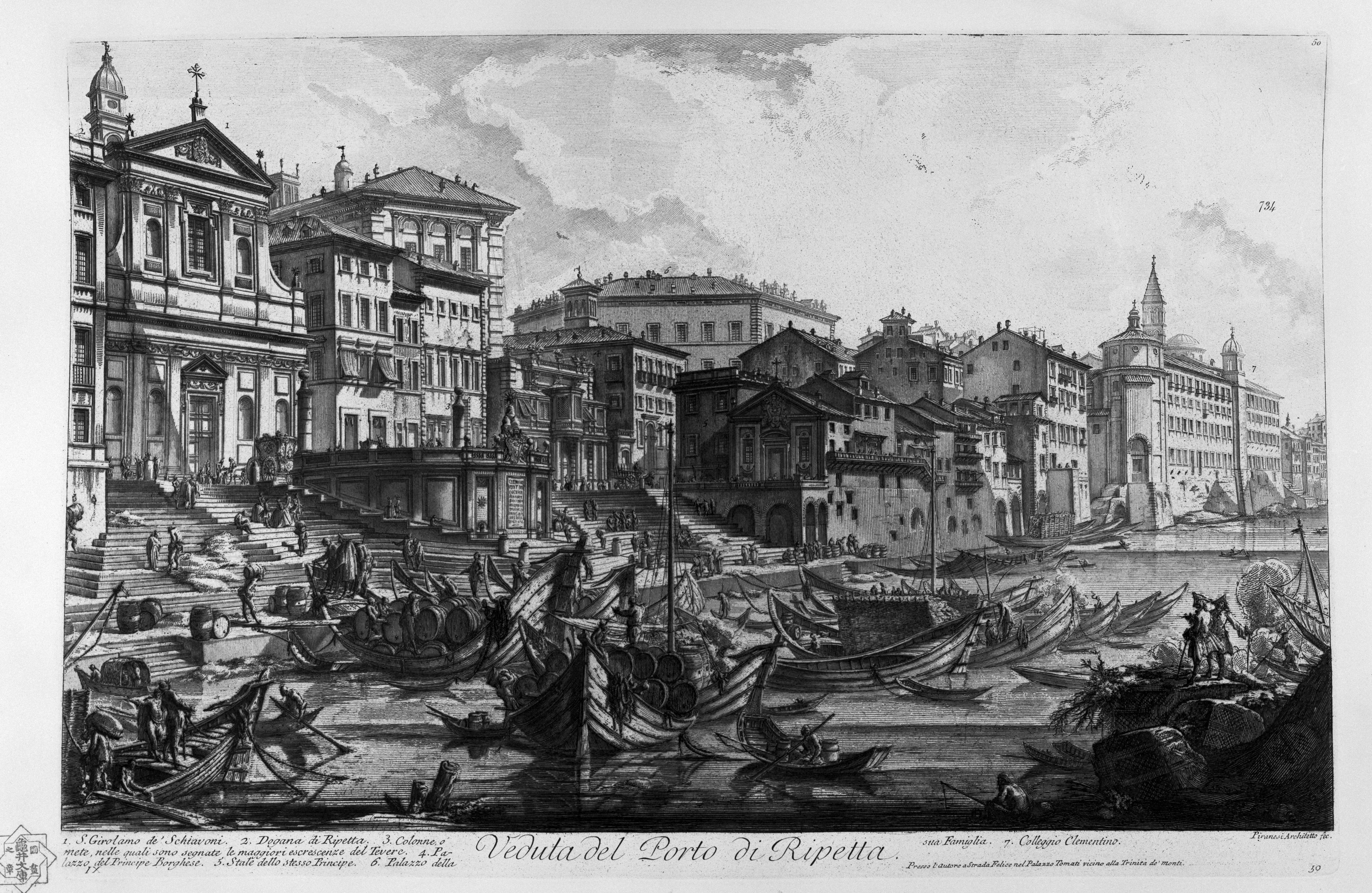
Porto di Ripetta

Kerr responded about the water: "Craig was kept imprisoned for upwards of nine months. Row's Coronis is shown to over-step geography in stating that he was confined within "a base prison or pit, into which the River Tiber flowed at every tide, so that the prisoners stood in water sometimes almost to their middle". This has been rebutted on the grounds that the Mediterranean is practically tideless. However, as devastating floods are not uncommon in Italy, the situation described was far from impossible. He further argues concerning the dog: "Craig himself frequently referred to this adventure. "He often repeated it to many in good standing", are Spottiswoode's words. Catholic opponents knew of it and repeated that it only proved that he had been in league with the Devil! But long before John Hamilton, able Catholic apologist questioned the story's authenticity in his Facile Tractise (1600) it was alluded to in the satirical verse of Nicol Burne." Later he says: "In sneering at Craig, Hamilton furnished gratuitously corroborative facts about him. This direct reference to his adventures, show that these were already well-known to friend and foe alike, and that by neither were they held in doubt. It is of interest to note that Hamilton's references have more in common with Row's account than Spottiswoode's."

Other writers have identified Palazzo di Ripetta near Porto di Ripetta and Ponte Cavour as a possible site for Craig's confinement.

== From Italy to Scotland (1560-1561) ==
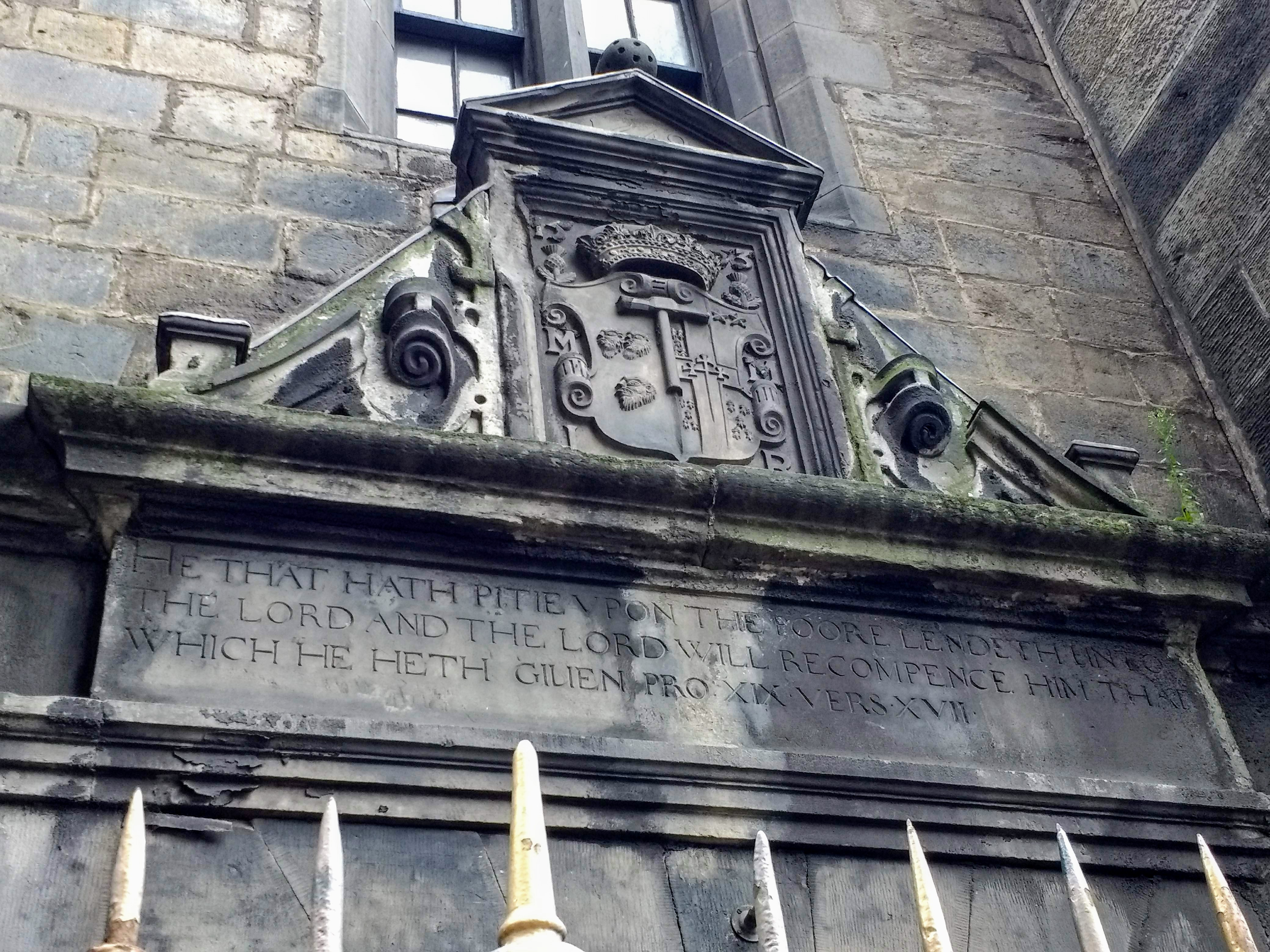
Magdalen Chapel inscription above the doorway

Craig made his way to Vienna, where as a Dominican, he preached before emperor Maximilian II, and soon became a favourite at court but his surrender was demanded by the new pope Pius IV. The Emperor gave him letters of safe conduct to England where he fled in 1560. John Willock, later one of the "six Johns" of the Scots Confession, was known to have been in London in the summer of 1560 and a meeting has been suggested, Kerr calling it "more than likely". Craig returned to Scotland in 1561 where he preached (in Latin) in the Magdalen Chapel in the Cowgate of Edinburgh.

== Parish ministry ==
=== In Edinburgh (1561-1571) ===
John Craig became minister of the Canongate in 1561, making him Mary, Queen of Scots's royal chaplain at Holyrood House in Edinburgh. In April 1562, John Knox requested that Craig might become his colleague in St Giles' Cathedral, and this was carried out, according to the Fasti, in 1563. The council wrote:

"The Council understanding the tedious and heavy labours sustained by their minister, John Knox, in preaching thrice in the week, and twice on the Sunday, ordains unanimously to solicit and persuade Master John Craig, presently minister of the Canongate, to accept upon him the half charge of the preaching in the said Kirk of Edinburgh, for such good deed as they can agree upon."

There seems to have been a problem with Craig's salary but Kerr asserts: "Stipend problems apart, it is quite clear...that Craig was one of the ministers of St. Giles’ as from the summer of 1562." Knox and Craig seem to have supported one another's ministries. Kerr says: "It was through Craig being at St. Gile's that Knox had greater freedom of movement to prosecute his missionary work than he otherwise would have had." The pastoral work was divided in two and both preachers undertook tours to strengthen their cause in other parts of the country: Knox in Nithsdale, Galloway and Kyle in autumn 1562, and Craig in Jedburgh the following year. They were later able to leave Edinburgh simultaneously for example in 1564 when Craig went back to the Merse churches for a month while Knox engaged in similar work north of the Forth. The two men supported each other in public life too. Knox was pleased by Craig's outspokeness against the nobility and called him "that worthy servant of God", approving is his public rebuke of courtiers. Craig supported Knox in the General Assembly too. In the debate about church and state relations, around the topic of the Queen's Mass, as Knox argued for denying the queen the Mass, with Craig providing supporting arguments on resisting rulers, whereas John Winram and John Douglas would have allowed her to celebrate it.

Craig presented a personal petition to the General Assembly of June, 1566. He desired that "John Cairns who had read prayers and exhorted four years and more in Edinburgh, and had well profited, might be joined with him in the Kirk of Edinburgh, in respect he was alone." The Assembly ordered the church of Edinburgh, with the assistance of John Spottiswood, to consider the matter. Apparently the crave was not granted for, Cairns's name appears in Town Council Minutes for many years afterwards as simply that of "reader". He is first mentioned in these Minutes as minister (and so thereafter) on 13 November 1584, and in that of 15 July 1586, as "ane of the ordinar ministers of this burgh . . This independent action on Craig's part, might be construed as being disloyal to Knox still absent from Edinburgh but, at this time, Craig, besides his General Assembly work, was in sole charge at St. Giles’ and urgently in need of ordained assistance.

=== In Montrose (1571-1573) ===
In 1571 he was sent by the assembly to Montrose "for the illuminating the north, and when he had remained two years thence to Aberdeen to illuminate those dark places in Mar, Buchan, and Aberdeen, and to teach the youth of the college there." John Durie, who was also a minister at St Giles, followed Craig as minister of Montrose.

=== In Aberdeen (1573-1579) ===
Craig moved to Aberdeen on 6 August 1573, where he remained six years, where he was named Superintendent of Mar and Buchan. It was at Aberdeen that Craig wrote and used his A Shorte Summe of the Whole Catechisme.

At Aberdeen Craig passed six years of incessant activity. He was appointed commissioner for visiting the province of Aberdeen in 1575, and was employed in similar functions in 1576 and 1578. He was member of twelve out of thirteen Assemblies, and in that of October 1576 he was elected moderator for a second time. It was during this period that the controversy was carried on concerning the lawfulness of the episcopal office. The question was debated in August 1575 by a committee appointed for the purpose, in which Craig, with Andrew Melville and James Lawson, was to take the negative side. Their report in condemnation of the order was approved in all points in the following year, and in 1581 bishops were utterly abolished. Craig had also a hand in the drawing up of the Second Book of Discipline, which was agreed upon in the Assembly of 1578. It was during his ministry here that he prepared his first or longer Catechism, as in the preface to the work he reminds "the Professovres of Christis Evangell at Newe Abirdene" that it was for their sake chiefly that he "toke paines first to gather this breife summe" and he now (July 1581) in setting it out and making it common to others, recommends the same to them again in special as a token of his goodwill, and a memorial of his doctrine and earnest labours bestowed upon them for the space of six years.

In the fortieth Assembly, held at Edinburgh, 7 July 1579 among certain Articles presented to the king was a petition that, as "his Highness' house is too great a charge for any one man, his Majesty would be pleased to nominate any one of the best-gifted in the kingdom to be adjoined colleague to Mr, John Duncanson" and in the following year, 12 July, it appears that "the king by his letters nominates Mr. John Craig to be his minister, for which the Assembly blessed the Lord, and praised the king for his zeal". Meanwhile, in view of his appointment as Royal Chaplain, Craig had left Aberdeen, 14 September 1579, with his wife and family.

=== In Edinburgh (officially the Chapel Royal of Stirling 1579-1600) ===
Craig left Aberdeen on 14 September 1579, to undertake the charge of minister of the Chapel Royal of Stirling. This meant he became domestic chaplain to James VI. A chamber was prepared for him in Holyrood Palace by the master of work William MacDowall at a cost of £25-8s-1d. In January 1581 he criticised James Stewart, Earl of Arran by preaching on the subject of false accusations. Arran had accused Regent Morton of involvement in the murder of Lord Darnley, and he threatened Craig with a dagger.

King James had personally appointed Craig, "one of the best-gifted in the kingdom" as his Royal Chaplain, so when Craig rebuked him during his captivity so sharply from the pulpit (19 September 1582) for having issued a proclamation offensive to the clergy, "the king wept".

== Craig's views on church-state relations ==
Craig's bold preaching against the nobles who seized the revenues of the church, so that "we can nocht discern the earl from the abbot," provoked the anger of William Maitland of Lethington, and in the memorable conference between that statesman and Knox in 1564 Craig backed his colleague's argument with a telling precedent of a discussion in the university of Bologna, where he had been present in 1554, and heard the thesis maintained "that all rulers, be they superior or inferior, may and ought to be refused or deposed by them by whom they are chosen, empowered, and admitted to their office, as oft as they break their promise made by oath to their subjects, because the prince is no less bound to his subjects than subjects to their princes." This had been applied, he said, in the case of a pope, whose governor had exceeded his limits and attempted to alter the law in part of his temporal dominions. "Then started up," narrates Knox, "ane lawbreaker of that corrupt court, and said, "Ye know nocht what ye say, for you tell us what was done in Bononia; we are ane kingdom and thou are but ane commonwealth;" to which Craig had the ready answer, "My lord, my judgment is that evrie kingdom is, or at least should be, ane commonwealth, albeit that evrie commonwealth be nocht ane kingdom.""

== Craig and Queen Mary ==
Craig's name appears with that of Knox in the list of persons privy to Rizzio's death on 9 March 1566, sent by the Earl of Bedford and Randolph to William Cecil. Mackay says "Proof of actual complicity is wanting, but there can be little doubt that the ministers of the reformed church approved the act after it was done, as Mary did the assassination of her brother James Stewart." Kerr says: "Queen Mary, now for the moment all-powerful, issued through her Privy Council a list of those implicated, and it surely bespeaks the innocence of Knox and Craig that they are not mentioned." The refusal by Craig to publish the banns between Mary and Bothwell is probably the act of his life most widely known.

It certainly showed courage to remonstrate when Edinburgh was in the hands of Bothwell's followers. At an interview with Bothwell and the privy council Craig laid to his charge "the law of adultery, the law of ravishing, the suspicion of collusion between him and his wife, the sudden divorcement and proclaiming within the space of four days, and last, the suspicion of the king's death, which her marriage would confirm."

He got no explanation on any of these points, but a letter from Mary having been shown him denying that she was under restraint, he in the end proclaimed the banns with a protest that "he abhorred and detested the marriage." In the General Assembly of Christmas Day 1567 Craig was blamed by some of his brethren for his compliance. Craig submitted a statement about his actions and at the Assembly of 6 July 1569 a resolution was passed absolving him, while Adam Bothwell, the bishop who performed the ceremony, was suspended.

Knox was convinced that his colleague had followed the proper course. He wrote:

"Notwithstanding all this done and said by Master Craig, and the opposition of many that wished well to the Queen, and were jealous of her honour, the marriage went on . . . And a bishop must bless the marriage. The good Prelate was Bishop of Orkney. If there is a good work to be done, a bishop must do it. Here mark the difference betwixt this worthy minister, and this base bishop."

In 1571 Knox, who had quarrelled with Mary, left Edinburgh for St. Andrews, but Craig, of a more conciliatory disposition, remained, and even lamented in a sermon "that there was no neutral man to make agreement between the two parties, seeing whatsoever party shall be overthrown the country shall be brought to ruin." Although he gave offence by this lukewarm attitude, he was chosen by the convention of the kirk at Leith one of the deputies to wait upon the queen's friends in the castle. The outspoken part he took in the conference, when he was again pitted against Lethington, is recorded in the Memorials of Bannatyne, who was himself present.

== Wider church work ==
At the General Assembly of June, 1565, Craig was on the business committee where he and a few others were appointed to collect causes for a public fast. Knox and Craig were commissioned to set down the form of exercise to be used, and to have it printed by Robert Lekprevik. A momentous event during this year, 1565, was the appearance of the completed Psalter for use in the Reformed Church. There are reasons for believing that Craig was author of fifteen of its psalm-versions and, that these include the familiar second versions of Psalms 102, 136, 143 and 145.

The General Assembly of June 1566 instructed Craig and John Spottiswood to interview the Queen who was then resident in the Castle. An audience being granted, they presented to her a supplication for the payment of ministers’ stipends due them out of the Thirds of benefices. Mary received the two representatives graciously. The next General Assembly convened during December, 1566, at which a letter, headed by the signature of John Craig, was sent to "their brethren the bishops and pastors of God's Church in England, who profess with us in Scotland, the truth of Jesus Christ." Kerr comments: "That Craig's name appears at the top of the signatures on the letter, would seem to indicate that at Knox's request, he had assumed the leadership of the Scottish Reformers during the absence of his colleague."

Craig played a vital role in writing the Second Book of Discipline for the Scottish Church. He was elected Moderator of the General Assembly of the Church of Scotland on three occasions. He drew up the National Covenant of 1581, and wrote a very popular catechism known as "Craig's Catechism". Craig was moreover a vigorous defender of the presbyterial form of church government in opposition to episcopacy, which brought him into conflict with King James.

On 21 July 1588 Craig officiated at the wedding of Henrietta Stewart and the Earl of Huntly at Holyroodhouse. Before the wedding the couple were made to declare their Protestant faith, without which he would not declare the banns.

Craig was a member of twelve out of thirteen Assemblies, and Moderator of General Assembly 1 March 1570 and 24 October 1576; was a commissioner for visiting the province of Aberdeen in 1575, and in 1576 one of five for that duty, having for his district "the laigh of Mar and Garioch with the Kirks of the Mearns beyond the Mounth on Deeside." He drew up the Confession of Faith which was subscribed by James VI, 2 March 1580, and adopted by the nation; was elected Moderator of the General Assembly for the third time, 17 October 1581. He was appointed in 1582 to make a collection of the Acts of Assembly, and in 1592 wrote an answer to an attack made on the Confession of Faith: neither of these was printed. He died 12 December 1600.

In Oct. 1583 the General Assembly app. him to intimate its approval of the seizure of the King by the Earl of Gowrie in the raid of Ruthven, and boldly rebuked James for his conduct. He denounced the Black Act passed by Parliament in 1584, restoring Episcopacy and recognising the Royal supremacy. At the conference at Falkland, to which he was summoned by Royal command, he had a stormy scene with Arran. For refusing submission to the Royal Ordinance he was interdicted from preaching and threatened with banishment. He, however, acted as mediator between the extreme Presbyterians led by Melville and the King and was successful in making a compromise in the form of the Oath required as to the King's supremacy in matters ecclesiastical "as far as the Word of God allows." In 1585 he preached before Parliament and in 1590 composed, at the request of the General Assembly, "A Form of Examination before Communion"

Always a member of assembly, he was twice moderator. As a member of the committee of the assembly of 1575, to consider the question of the episcopal office, he reported against it, and this report was followed by the abolition of episcopacy in 1581. In 1579 Craig, having been appointed one of the king's chaplains, returned to Edinburgh, when he took part in the composition of ‘The Second Book of Discipline’ and ‘The National Covenant’ of 1580.

In 1581, to meet a panic of a revival of papacy caused by the arrival of the Duke of Lennox from France, he wrote: ‘Ane Shorte and Generale Confession of the true Christian Fayth and Religion, according to God's Worde and Actes of our Parliamentes.’ This confession was signed by the king and his household, from which circumstance it received the name of the king's confession. It was required to be signed by all parish ministers, and in 1585 by all graduates. It was confirmed in 1590 and 1595, and became the basis of the covenant of 1638 as well as the solemn league and covenant of 1643. In October 1581 Craig was sent by the assembly to intimate their approval of the seizure of the king by the Earl of Gowrie in the raid of Ruthven, and boldly rebuked James for his conduct, drawing tears from him as Knox had done from Mary.

When parliament in 1584 passed the Black Acts restoring episcopacy and recognising the royal supremacy, Craig denounced them from the pulpit, and in answer to Arran and the court declared that ‘he would find fault with everything that is repugnant to the word of God.’ A conference at Falkland, where he was summoned by the king, gave rise to a stormy scene between him and Arran, who then ruled the court. Interdicted from preaching and threatened with banishment for refusing submission to the royal ordinance, Craig again tried to act the part of a mediator between the king and the extreme presbyterian party led by Melville, and proposed an addition to the oath required as to the king's supremacy in matters ecclesiastical ‘as far as the word of God allows.’ This compromise was accepted by the king, and the oath was so taken by Craig and the other royal chaplains, Erskine of Drum, and many of the ministers of the north. In 1585 a sermon he preached before parliament from the text, ‘God sitteth among the assembly of the gods,’ from which he deduced the duty of obedience to kings, was severely condemned. A curious discussion of it between the Earl of Angus and David Hume of Godscroft is given by Calderwood (History, iv. 466).

== Final years ==
Craig was now in the decline of life, and his moderation did not please more youthful zealots. But he showed no signs of departing from the reformed doctrines. In 1590 he composed, at the request of the assembly, A Form of Examination before Communion, and in 1593 James requested the assembly to choose a list from which he might select two in respect "of Mr. Craig's decrepit age," but he continued to hold his office of chaplain for some time longer.

In August 1595 the English diplomat George Nicholson wrote that Craig was "old and now almost past teaching."

John Craig died on 12 December 1600 at the age of eighty-eight. His wife and his son William were named executors of his will, but are requested to take the advice of his relative, Thomas Craig, advocate. A portrait of Thomas Craig's third son John Craig had been thought to portray the reformer.

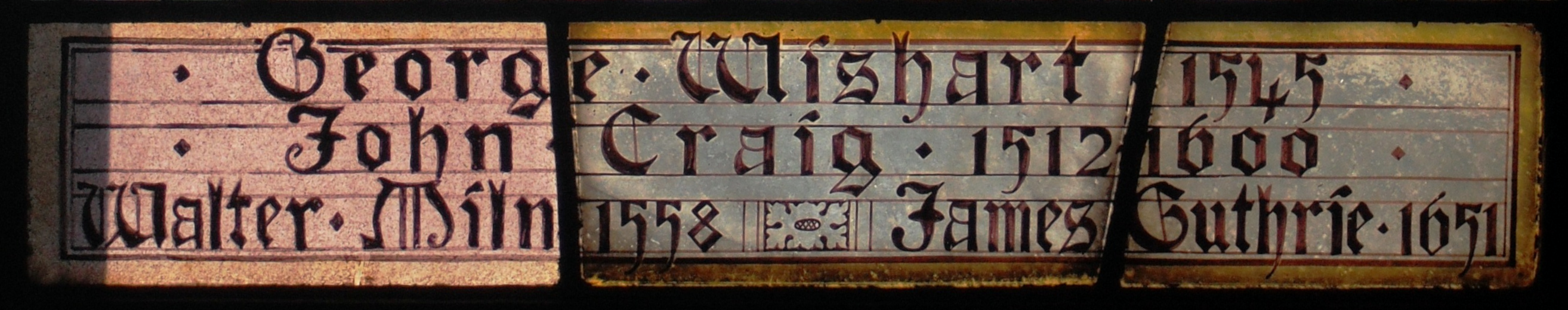
Window in Edinburgh Castle's Great Hall. George Wishart (c.1513 – 1 Mar 1546), Walter Miln (d. Apr 1558), James Guthrie (1612? – 1 Jun 1661)

== Family ==
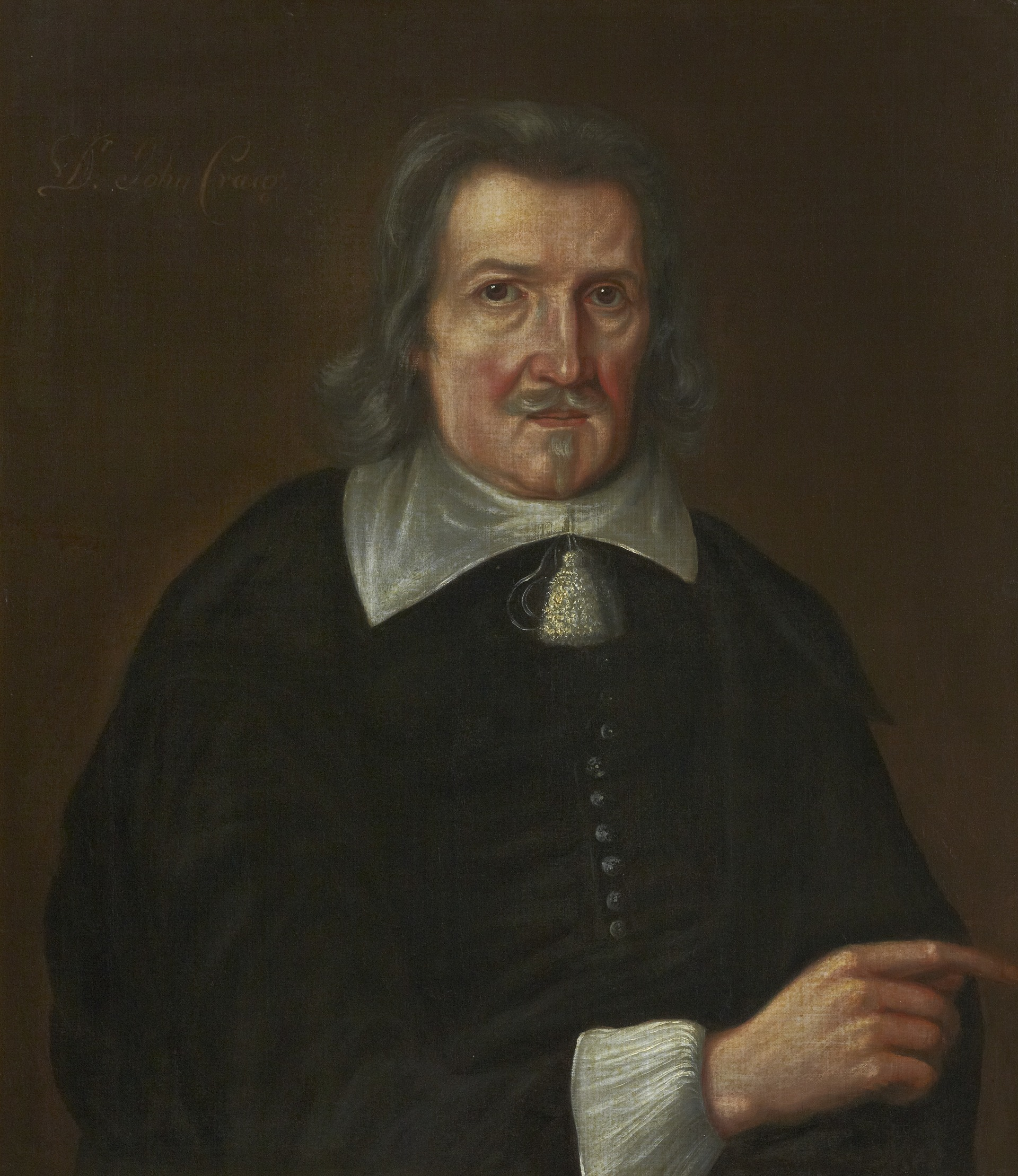
John Craig died 1655. Physician to James VI and Charles I. Third son of the reformer's nephew Thomas Craig. This seems to be the portrait of "John Craig" which Hew Scott mentions and Kirkwood Hewat describes in great detail. They both seem to think it was the reformer although Kerr casts doubt on this.

He married before 1574, Marion Smail or Small, who died in 1630, and had issue —

- William, M.A., Professor of Divinity in University of Samur, "grave, learned, retired, moderate, and without reproach," baptized 9 October 1575, died "in the Blackfriars' Wynd," Edinburgh, November 1616. This son was a professor in the college of Edinburgh in 1599, but in the year of his father's death went to St. Andrews as professor of divinity, from which he afterwards returned to Edinburgh, where he died in 1616.
- Margaret (married 29 November 1598, Robert Favelie, goldsmith)
- Barbara who married William Watson, minister at Marchinch and had issue — William, bapt. 27 July 1595; James, bapt. 29th March 1598, died young; Janet (marr. David Phin, sailor, Burntisland); Rebecca

== Publications ==
One of Psalms translated by John Craig ("I.C.") ca. AD 1564, Scottish Psalter

- A Shorte Summe of the Whole Catechisme (Edinburgh, printed by Henry Charteris, 1581)
- Ane Form of Examination before the Communion (Edinburgh, 1591)
- He is believed to have been the translator of fifteen psalms which have the initials I.C. in the Metrical Psalms (Edinburgh, 1565), and the "second versions" of Psalms 102, 136, 143, and 145 are his.
- There was thought to be a portrait of Craig in possession of Sir Henry Gibson-Craig, Bart., at Riccarton

== Bibliography ==
- Bain's Cal. Scottish State Papers
- Register of the Privy Council Scotland
- Knox's, Calderwood's and Grub's Eccles. Histories
- Hay Fleming's Mary, Queen of Scots
- Knox's History of the Reformation
- Edin. Tests.
- Laing MSS.
- Hist. MS. Com., 167
- Principal Story's John Craig (privately printed, 1884)
- Edin. Bibliog. Soc. Proc. (1898)
