= John Row =

John Row may refer to:

- John Row (reformer) (c. 1525–1580), Scottish reformer
- John Row (minister, born 1568), Scottish historian and reformer
- John Row (minister, born 1598), his son
- John Row (poet) (born 1947), English storyteller
- John Row (MP) for Totnes
- John Row (Australian politician) (1905–1993), member of the Queensland Legislative Assembly

== See also ==
- John Rowe (disambiguation)
- John Roe (disambiguation)
