= Scottish Reformation Parliament =

1560 religious assembly in Scotland

The Scottish Reformation Parliament was the assembly elected in 1560 that passed legislation leading to the establishment of the Church of Scotland. These included the Confession of Faith Ratification Act 1560; and Papal Jurisdiction Act 1560. The legislation was not formally approved until 1567, when it was ratified by James VI.

== Background ==
In 1559, John Knox returned to Scotland, marking a new effort in his battle to reform the nation. Scottish Protestants in the 1520s and 1530s were Lutherans such as Patrick Hamilton and George Wishart, who translated the First Helvetic Confession written by Heinrich Bullinger, marking the impact of the Swiss Reformation. With the return of Knox from Geneva Scottish Protestants rallied around him and the Scottish Reformation continued to be characterised by the example of John Calvin in Geneva.

Queen dowager Mary of Guise, acting as regent for her daughter Mary, Queen of Scots, viewed the Protestants as a serious threat and felt the use of force would be necessary against them. Civil war appeared imminent. Knox at once became the clerical leader of the reformers. He preached against "idolatry" with the greatest boldness, with the result that what he later called the "rascal multitude" began the "purging" of churches and the destruction of monasteries and nunneries. Armed conflict became centred at the siege of Leith and in Fife.

Mary of Guise died on 11 June 1560, and a peace was concluded in July by the Treaty of Edinburgh. The youthful Mary Queen of Scots, then resident in France, gave permission, through her husband, Francis II, for Parliament to meet in her absence, but religious questions were specifically to be submitted to the "intention and pleasure" of the king and queen. Still, in August 1560 the 'Reformation Parliament' abolished the jurisdiction of the Roman Catholic Church in Scotland with the Papal Jurisdiction Act.

== Course ==
The Parliament agreed on 16 August to pursue the marriage of Elizabeth I of England to James Hamilton, 3rd Earl of Arran. According to an English diplomat, Thomas Randolph, the first day's business passed quickly, and he "never saw so important matters sooner dispatched". When this first session of the Parliament was concluded, the Duke of Châtellherault gave the Clerk Register a silver coin to have the proceedings recorded.

The key act, the Reformed Confession of Faith was established by Parliament on 17 August. The Scots Confession had been drafted by six ministers: John Winram, John Spottiswood, John Willock, John Douglas, John Row and John Knox. On 17 August 1560, the document was read twice, article by article, before the Parliament, and the Protestant ministers stood ready to defend "the cause of truth" if any article of belief was assailed.

When the vote was taken, the Confession was ratified and adopted. An assembly of several ministers and laymen, subsequently known as the first General Assembly of the Church of Scotland met in Edinburgh, and the First Book of Discipline (1560) was drawn up. The Second Book of Discipline (1581) was ratified much later by Parliament in 1592 (see General Assembly Act 1592). This definitely settled the Presbyterian form of polity and the Calvinistic doctrine as the recognised Protestant establishment in the country.

On 26 August the Parliament approved the Treaty of Berwick (1560), and James Stewart, 1st Earl of Moray requested and received special confirmation that the acts of the Lords of the Congregation were lawful. The authority of the Pope in Scotland was abrogated without contradiction.

The work of the 'Reformation Parliament' was popularly acclaimed but not formally ratified until seven years later by James VI. Mary never ratified it.

== Process and ceremony ==
The English correspondent Thomas Randolph described the ceremony surrounding the selection of the Lords of the Articles on 9 August 1560. The lords convened at Holyroodhouse then rode to the Tollbooth near St Giles. Mary, Queen of Scots was represented by the crown, mace and sword. After a speech by William Maitland, the articles of the peace with France were read and confirmed. The Lords of the Articles were chosen – these decided the agenda for the full parliament session. Then all the lords processed with the Duke of Châtellerault to the Netherbow, and back to the Palace. The whole town wore armour, with trumpets sounding, and all other kinds of music. Randolph was confident the Lords of the Articles would commune on the "dysannullinge" of Papal authority.

== See also ==
- History of the Reformation - Knox's account of the Reformation in Scotland.
- English Reformation Parliament, 1529-1536
- List of parliaments of Scotland
- Thomas Thomson, ed., Acts of the Parliaments of Scotland, vol. 2, (1814)
