= Row (surname) =

Row is a surname. Notable people by that name include:

- John Row (minister, born 1568), was a Scottish historian.
- John Row (poet) (born 1947), English storyteller.
- John Row (MP) for Totnes.
- Nicole Row, touring bassist for Panic! At the Disco.
- Robert Row (1915–1999), English fascist.
- William Row 17th century, Scottish minister and son-in-law of Robert Blair
- William Bickford Row (1786–1865), English-Canadian merchant, lawyer and politician
