= John Row (minister, born 1598) =

Scottish Presbyterian minister (1598?–1672)

Personal details
- Born: 1598?
- Died: 1672
- Denomination: Protestant

John Row, born 1598, was the second son of John Row, minister of Carnock, and grandson of John Row, the Reformer. He educated at University of St Andrews graduating with an M.A. in 1617. He was elected schoolmaster of Kirkcaldy 2 November 1619, resigning before 25 November 1628. He was licensed by the Presbytery of Dalkeith 29 September 1631 and became tutor to George Hay, afterwards second Earl of Kinnoul, by whose father, the Lord Chancellor's recommendation, he was appointed master of the Grammar School of Perth in June 1632. He was ordained to Third Charge, Aberdeen, 14 December 1641 and appointed on 23 November 1642 as lecturer on Hebrew in Marischal College. He was so actively engaged in support of the Covenanting party that on the approach of Montrose to Aberdeen in 1646 he was compelled to take refuge in Dunnottar Castle. Row was appointed by the General Assembly in 1647 to revise the new version of the Psalms from 90 to 120. He was a member of the Commission of Assembly in 1648, and of Commission for visiting the University of Aberdeen 31 July 1649. John Row joined the Independents and was admitted to a church of that persuasion in Edinburgh. He was promoted to Principalship of King's College in Aberdeen in September 1652. He resigned in 1661, and thereafter kept a school in Aberdeen. He died at the manse of Kinellar in October 1672 and was buried at Kinellar.

== Early life and education ==
John Row, principal of King's College in the University of Aberdeen, the second son of John Row, minister of Carnock, Fife, by Grisel, daughter of David Ferguson, minister of Dunfermline, was born about 1598. He was educated at St. Leonard's College in the University of St. Andrews, where he took the degree of M.A. in 1617. Subsequently, he acted as tutor of George Hay (afterwards second Earl of Kinnoull); and on 2 November 1619, at the instance of the kirk session, confirmed by the town council, he was appointed master of the grammar school of Kirkcaldy. In June 1632, on the recommendation of the lord chancellor, he was appointed rector of the grammar school of Perth, at that time probably the most important scholastic appointment in the country, with which he had also hereditary associations.

== Row in Aberdeen ==
Like his namesakes his father and grandfather, Row was an accomplished Hebrew scholar; and in 1634 he published a Hebrew grammar, appended to which were commendatory Latin verses by Andrew Henderson, Samuel Rutherford, and other eminent divines. A second edition, together with a vocabulary, appeared at Glasgow in 1644. He held the rectorship of Perth Academy until 1641, when, at the instance of Andrew Cant, one of the ministers of Aberdeen, he was on 16 November elected minister of St. Nicholas Church in that city, his admission taking place on 14 December. On 23 November 1642 he was also appointed by the magistrates of Aberdeen to give weekly lessons in Hebrew in Marischal College. In 1643 he published a Hebrew lexicon, which he dedicated to the town council, receiving from them "for his services four hundred merks Scots money." Row proved to be a zealous co-operator with Cant in exercising a rigid ecclesiastical rule over the citizens (Spalding, Memorialls, passim); and showed special zeal in requiring subscription to the solemn league and covenant (ib. ii. 288–9). On the approach of Montrose to Aberdeen in the spring of 1646, both he and Cant fled south and took refuge in the castle of Dunnottar (Patrick Gordan, Britanes Distemper, p. 112; Spalding, Memorialls, p. 459), but returning at the end of March, after Montrose's departure, they denounced him in their pulpits with unbridled vehemence (ib. p. 464). On the approach of Montrose in the beginning of May they again fled (ib. p. 469), but when Montrose had passed beyond Aberdeen they returned, and on the 10th warned the inhabitants to go to the support of General Baillie.

== National involvements ==
By the assembly of 1647 Row was appointed to revise a new metrical version of the Psalms, from the 90th to the 120th Psalm. In 1648 he was named one of a committee to revise the proceedings of the last commission of the assembly, and on 23 July 1649 one of a commission for visiting the University of Aberdeen. He was one of the six ministers appointed to assist the committee of despatches in drawing up instructions to the commissioners sent to London to protest against the hasty proceedings taken against the life of Charles I (Sir James Balfour, Annals, iii. 385).

== Protestors and resolutioners ==
Row belonged to a party for whom the defeat at Dunbar brought about a deep level of soul-searching. They wanted Achan-like separation from anything that didn't meet up to their standards. When the rescinding of the Act of Classes allowed, in resolutions, those they considered tainted to assume roles in public life they protested. The leaders of the Protestors were Patrick Gillespie and Johnston of Warriston. Rutherford, Traill and James Guthrie were also prominent. Patrick Gillespie strenuously opposed the "Engagement" for the rescue of Charles I, helped to overthrow the government that sanctioned it, and advocated severe measures against all 'malignants.' He considered the terms made with Charles II unsatisfactory, and after the battle of Dunbar (3 September 1650) he assembled a meeting of gentlemen and ministers in the west, and persuaded them to raise a separate armed force, which was placed under the command of officers recommended by him. He was the author of the "Western Remonstrance" (December 1650) addressed to parliament by the "gentlemen, commanders, and ministers attending the Westland Force", in which they made charges against the public authorities, condemned the treaty with the king, and declared that they could not take his side against Cromwell. Soon after the commission of assembly passed resolutions in favour of allowing malignants, on profession of their repentance, to take part in the defence of the country. Against this Gillespie and his friends, including Row, protested, and when the general assembly met in July 1651 they protested against its legality. For this Gillespie and two others were deposed from the ministry. They and their sympathisers disregarded the sentence, and made a schism in the church.

== From Presbyterianism to Independency ==
Provost Jaffray of Aberdeen was captured at Dunbar and carried to England. Staunch Covenanter though he was, his intercourse with Sectaries in that country gave him leanings to Independency, and later he became a Quaker. To the Presbyterian mindset this was a notable illustration of the danger of mingling with those who were in wrong paths. Wariston evidently loved the man and tried hard to save him from such scandals. Colonel Lockhart was likewise infected with Brownist views, and proposed to start a congregation in Aberdeen. John Menzies and John Row were also (to this way of thinking) corrupted. Some books or pamphlets which had belonged to Calderwood fell into Wariston's hands, and were useful in this connection. A letter of five full sheets of paper, which he wrote on this matter, gave satisfaction to David Dickson and the other ministers of Edinburgh before it was sent on to Aberdeen, where Andrew Cant was preaching against Row and Menzies, and Row and Menzies against Cant, "to the great offence of the people." Even Patrick Gillespie, in spite of his "natural proud humour," became less resolute in the cause; spoke disdainfully of testifying as "a paper busnes and paper feyght"; and accepted the principalship of Glasgow University at the hands of the Sectaries, as Leighton did that of Edinburgh, and Row that of Aberdeen.

== Cromwell and the Protestors ==
Many of the "Protesters", as the dissenters were called, preferred Cromwell to the king, and some of them became favourable to independency. Gillespie was the leader of this section, and there was no one in Scotland who had more influence with the Protector. His appointment to the principalship of the University of Glasgow followed in 1652, over protests on the grounds that the election belonged to the professors, that he was insufficient in learning, and had been deposed from the ministry. In 1653 Cromwell turned the general assembly out of doors, and in the following year he called Gillespie and two other protesters to London to consult with them on a new settlement of Scottish ecclesiastical affairs. The result was the appointment of a large commission of protesters, who were empowered to purge the church, and to withhold the stipend from any one appointed to a parish who had not a testimonial from four men of their party. This was known as 'Gillespie's Charter,' hated by the Resolutioners, who formed a majority of the church.

== Principal of King's College and demise ==
John Row separated from the Kirk of Scotland, and became minister of an independent church in Edinburgh. It was probably his independent principles that commended Row to the notice of Cromwell's parliament, by whom he was in 1652 appointed principal of King's College, Aberdeen. It was during his term of office that the college was rebuilt, and for this purpose he set apart yearly a hundred merks, contributing in all two hundred and fifty merks (Fasti Aber. p. 532). Notwithstanding his previous zeal as a covenanter, and the fact also that he had been specially indebted to Cromwell, Row at the Restoration endeavoured to secure the favour of the new authorities by the publication of a poetical address to the king in Latin entitled Eucharistia basilikē, in which he referred to Cromwell as a "cruel vile worm". But this late repentance proved of no avail. In 1661 he was deposed from the principalship of King's College (the Caroline University was also dissolved at this time), and various writings which he had penned against the king were taken from the college to the cross of Aberdeen, where they were burned by the common hangman. Having saved no money while he held the principalship, Row now found himself in his old age compelled to maintain himself by keeping a school in New Aberdeen, some of his old friends also contributing to his necessities by private donations.

In his final years he retired to the manse of his son-in-law, Rev John Mercer, minister of Kinellar, where he died about 1672. He was buried inside the church at its west end. Besides other children, he had a son John Row, minister first at Stronachar in Galloway, and afterwards at Dalgetty in Fife.

== Family ==
He married and had issue — John, minister of St Bride's in Dalgety; Lilias (married John Mercer, minister of Kinellar); Grizel (married Hugh Anderson, minister of Cromarty); Margaret, died 4 June 1672. K. D. Holfelder, in 2004, says "Details of his wife are not known, but they had at least one child, a daughter." which is puzzling as he mentions both volumes of the Fasti where the above information is found.

== Works ==
Row wrote a continuation of his father's history, which is included in the edition of that history published by the Wodrow Society and the Maitland Club in 1842. It is quaintly entitled "Supplement to the Historie of the Kirk of Scotland, from August Anno 1637, and thence forward to July 1639; or ane Handfull of Goate's Haire for the furthering of the building of the Tabernacle; a Short Table of Principall Things for the proving of the most excellent Historie of this late Blessed Work of Reformation."

- Hebra Lingual Institutiones (Glasgow, 1634, 1644)
- Xilias Hebraica (Glasgow, 1644)
- Eucharistia Basilike (Aberdeen, 1660)
- Supplement to the Historic of the Kirk of Scotland, 1637-9 [a continuation of his father's work][Wodrow Soc. and Maitland Club] (Edinburgh, 1842)

== Bibliography ==
- Spalding's Memorialls of the Trubles, and Fasti Aberdonenses (Spalding Club)
- Robert Baillie's Letters and Journals (Bannatyne Club)
- Sir James Balfour's Annals
- Memorials of the Family of Row, 1827
- Hew Scott's Fasti Eccles. Scoticanæ, iii. 471.
- Laing's Notices (Row's Hist.)
- Scott's Reformers
- Baillie's Letters
- Lamont's Diary, 47
- Nisbet's Heraldic Plates, 121
