= Reformation Parliament =

Reformation Parliament may refer to:

- English Reformation Parliament of 1529-1536
- Scottish Reformation Parliament, commencing 1560
