= John Rowe =

John Rowe may refer to:

== Businessmen ==
- John Rowe (Exelon), head of Chicago energy concern Exelon Corporation
- John Rowe (Aetna) (born 1944), former CEO and executive chairman of U.S. health care benefits company Aetna

== Others ==
- John Rowe (minister) (1626–1677), English clergyman
- John Rowe (actor) (born 1941), British actor
- John Rowe (naval officer), navy officer of the U.S. Navy during the First Barbary War
- John Rowe (merchant) (1715–1787), merchant and politician in Boston, Massachusetts, during the American Revolution
- John Rowe (author) (1936–2017), Australian author
- John Howland Rowe (1918–2004), American anthropologist
- John Rowe (Australian politician) (1816–1886), member of South Australian parliament
- John Carlos Rowe, American academic and author
- Jack Rowe (1856–1911), American baseball player for the Buffalo Bisons
- John Tetley Rowe (1861–1915), Anglican priest

== See also ==
- John Row (disambiguation)
- John Roe (disambiguation)
- Jonathan Rowe (disambiguation)
