= Jonathan Rowe =

Jonathan or Johnny Rowe may refer to:

- Johnny Rowe (footballer, born 1907) (1907–1953), English football right-back
- Jonathan Rowe (1946–2011), American journalist; see Point Reyes Light
- Jonathan Rowe (politician) (born 1998), member of the Canadian Parliament
- Jonathan Rowe (footballer, born 2003), English football winger

== See also ==
- John Rowe (disambiguation)
