= Forgandenny =

Coordinates: 56.346118°N 3.479960°W

Forgandenny: Scottish Gaelic: Forgrann Eithne
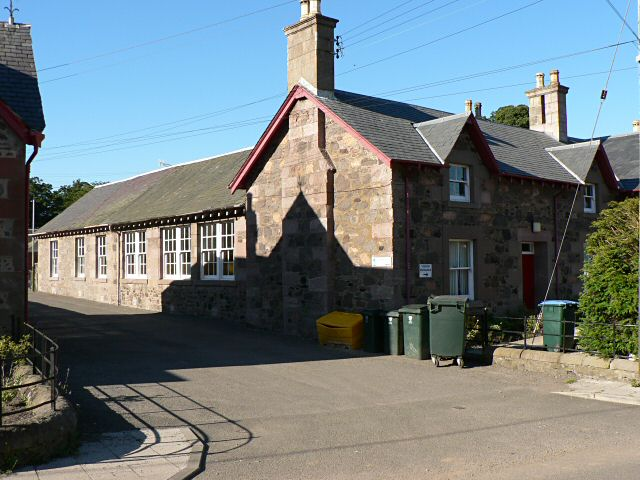
- Forgandenny primary school

- Location within Perth and Kinross
- Population: 560 (2020)
- OS grid reference: NO086180
- Council area: Perth and Kinross
- Country: Scotland
- Sovereign state: United Kingdom
- Post town: PERTH
- Postcode district: PH2
- Dialling code: 01738
- Police: Scotland
- Fire: Scottish
- Ambulance: Scottish
- UK Parliament: Ochil and South Perthshire
- Scottish Parliament: Perthshire South and Kinross-shire

Forgandenny (Scottish Gaelic Forgrann Eithne, 'Over-Bog of Eithne' [an ancient female Gaelic name]) is a small village in Perth and Kinross, Scotland, located four miles south of Perth. Perth is a 20-minute bus ride from Forgandenny, and there is a regular Stagecoach service. It is 45 minutes from Edinburgh and one hour from Glasgow. There is a daily train service from Perth to London King's Cross.

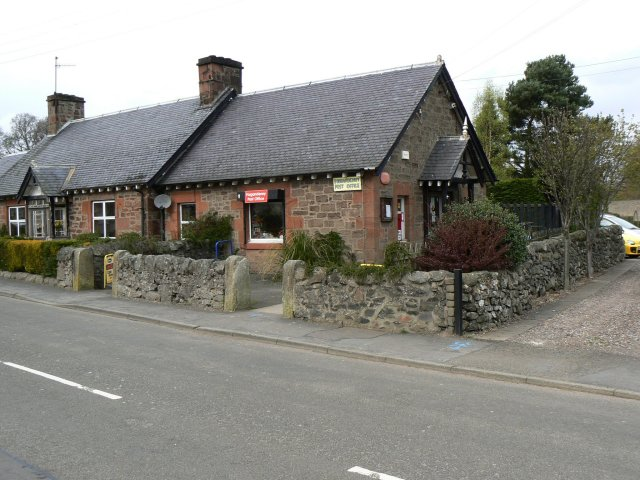
The post office

Forgandenny has a church (of Norman origin, though the windows and doors are not original), village hall and a primary school. Its Post Office closed in 2020 after its owners retired. The Post Office said it is committed to maintaining a branch in the village.

Near the village since 1920 is Strathallan School, a boarding school of approximately 550 pupils and 70 staff, many of whom live in Forgandenny.

== Notable people ==
- William Oliphant, Lord Newton
- William Row
- William Balmain, First Fleet surgeon
