= Hill of Row =

High ground in Stirlingshire, Scotland

Coordinates: 56.1745°N 4.0130°W

The Hill of Row (Scottish Gaelic: Cnoc Nan Rhu; Scots: Hill o Rou) is the high ground south east of Doune in Stirlingshire.

== Etymology ==
The word Row, pronounced Roo comes from the Scottish Gaelic word Rudha, meaning point and refers to the ground on which the house of Row stands, above the River Teith. The Row name lends itself to Row House, and to three farms, Hillside of Row, Wester Row and Easter Row.

== Row House ==
Row House

This modest pink mansion can be seen from the Carse of Lecropt road.

The original old house of Row burned down in 1806 and no trace of it exists.

This was originally the property of the Row-Fogo family, with a record dated 1480 of a Patrick Fogo at Row. The house is privately owned but opens its gardens to the public on weekends throughout July.

== Standing stones ==
Hill of Row is the site of remains of a stone circle with three remaining stones still standing near the David Stirling statue, and a solitary standing stone, beside Glenhead Farm.

== David Stirling statue ==
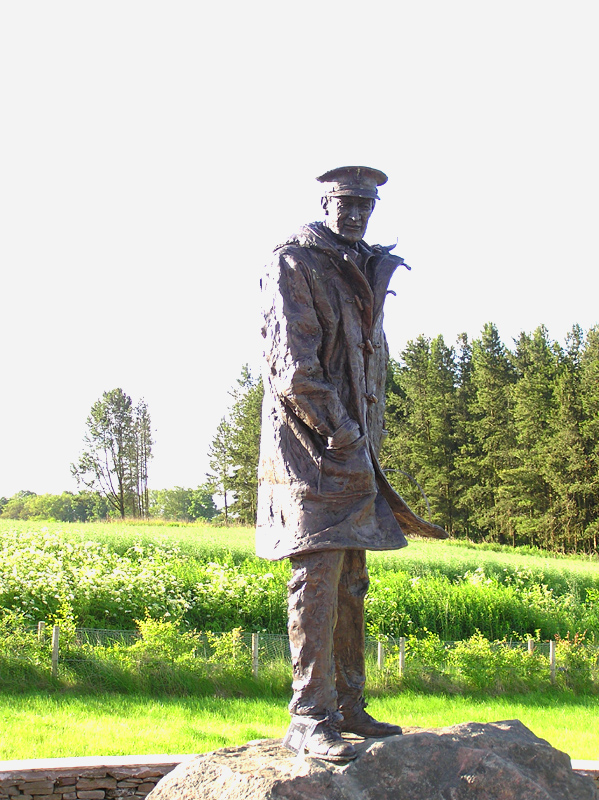
David Stirling statue

Since 2002 a statue of David Stirling has stood on a rock on the Hill of Row, near his ancestral home, looking towards the Perthshire mountains. It can be found just north of the B824 between the roundabout at the north end of the M9 and Doune.

== See also ==
- John Row - a religious reformer, born in the area (and named after it) c.1525
