= List of listed buildings in Carnock, Fife =

This is a list of listed buildings in the parish of Carnock in Fife, Scotland.

== List ==
Name	Location	Date listed	Grid ref. (Note: Sometimes known as OSGB36, the grid reference (where provided) is based on the British national grid reference system used by the Ordnance Survey. • "Guide to National Grid". Ordnance Survey. • "Get-a-map". Ordnance Survey.)	Geo-coordinates	Notes	LB number (Note: Historic Environment Scotland assign a unique alphanumeric identifier to each designated site in Scotland, for listed buildings this always begins with "LB", for example "LB12345".)	Image
Gowkhall, Luscar House And Stables				56°05′20″N 3°31′27″W	Category B	43646	Upload Photo
45 Station Road Oakley				56°05′02″N 3°34′04″W	Category B	3432	Upload Photo
Blair House				56°05′23″N 3°33′57″W	Category B	3420	Upload Photo
Pitdinnie Dovecot South Pitdinnie Farm				56°03′57″N 3°31′58″W	Category B	3430	Upload another image
Cairneyhill Church Of Scotland Main Street Cairneyhill				56°03′39″N 3°31′31″W	Category B	3431	Upload another image
Easter Luscar House				56°05′32″N 3°31′26″W	Category C(S)	3419	Upload Photo
Carnock Parish Manse Main Street Carnock				56°05′07″N 3°32′31″W	Category C(S)	3410	Upload Photo
Blair Tower Blair Tower Wood				56°05′21″N 3°33′34″W	Category B	3421	Upload another image
Newbigging Farmhouse				56°05′20″N 3°32′14″W	Category C(S)	3433	Upload Photo
Sepulchral Monument And Burial Enclosure Carnock Burial Ground				56°05′07″N 3°32′32″W	Category B	3412	Upload Photo
Oakley, Station Road, Church Of The Most Holy Name				56°04′47″N 3°34′06″W	Category B	45593	Upload another image
Carnock Parish Kirk Main Street Carnock				56°05′04″N 3°32′24″W	Category B	3409	Upload Photo
The Old Inn 6 Main Street Carnock				56°05′03″N 3°32′22″W	Category C(S)	3413	Upload Photo
Carnock Village Carnock House Garden Walls And Gatepiers				56°05′10″N 3°32′43″W	Category B	3429	Upload Photo

== Key ==
The scheme for classifying buildings in Scotland is:

- Category A: "buildings of national or international importance, either architectural or historic; or fine, little-altered examples of some particular period, style or building type."
- Category B: "buildings of regional or more than local importance; or major examples of some particular period, style or building type, which may have been altered."
- Category C: "buildings of local importance; lesser examples of any period, style, or building type, as originally constructed or moderately altered; and simple traditional buildings which group well with other listed buildings."

In March 2016 there were 47,288 listed buildings in Scotland. Of these, 8% were Category A, and 50% were Category B, with the remaining 42% being Category C.

== See also ==
- List of listed buildings in Fife
