= David Ferguson (reformer) =

Scottish reformer and church leader (c.1533–1598)

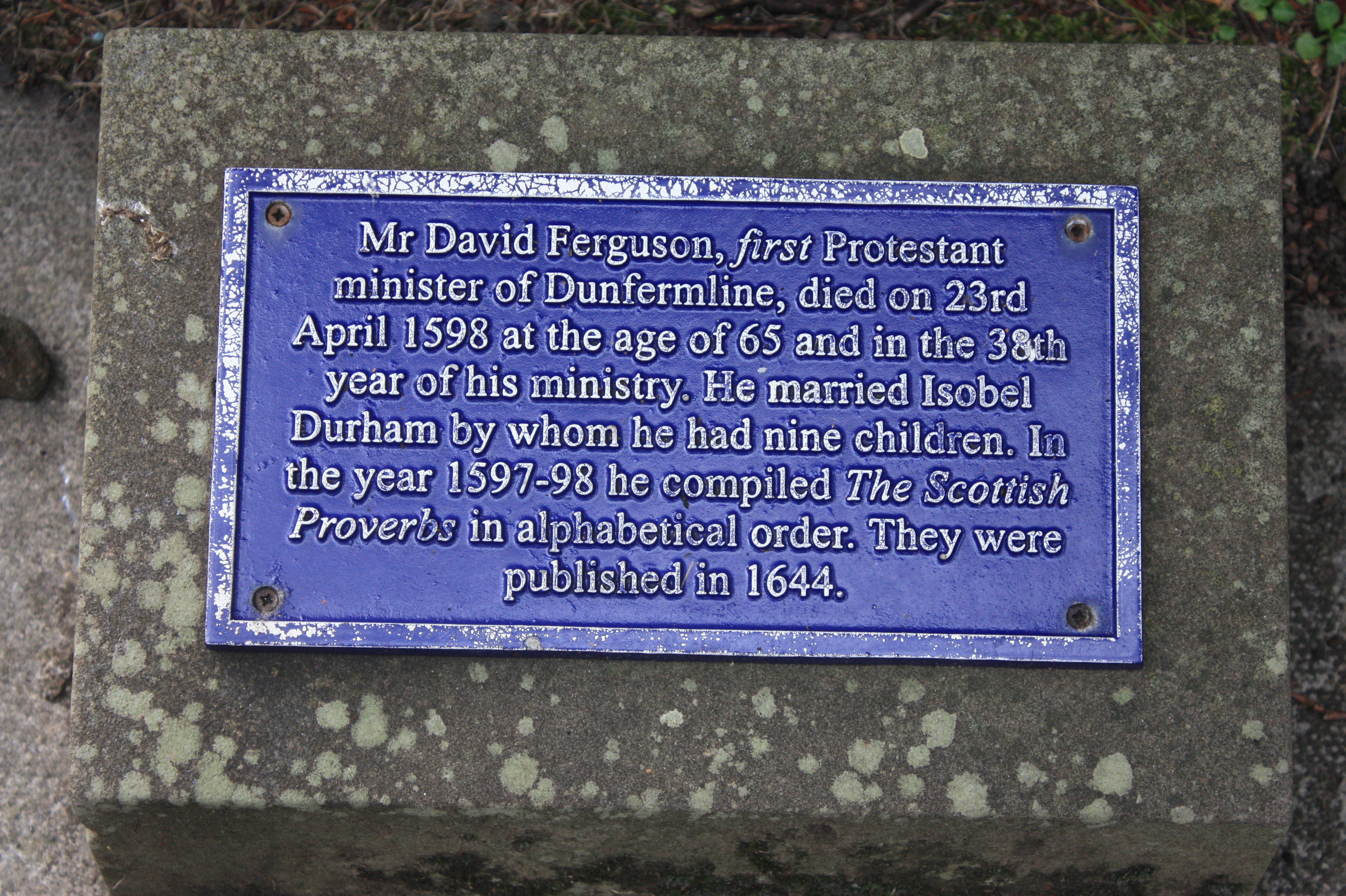
- plaque on David Ferguson's grave

Personal details
- Born: David Ferguson or Fergusson; 1533 (or before) Dundee (probably)
- Died: 23 April 1598 Dunfermline
- Denomination: Church of Scotland
- Education: none

David Fergusson or Ferguson (c. 1533–23 April 1598) was a Scottish reformer and minister of the Church of Scotland. He twice served as Moderator of the General Assembly of the Church of Scotland: 1573 and 1578.

He is said to have been a native of Dundee, though this is not certain. The date of his birth is also conjectural. Spottiswood believed it to be about 1533, while Wodrow suggests ten, or even twenty years earlier, and David Laing thought it could not have been later than 1525. Ferguson was a glover to trade, and though he never attended a university he had a good knowledge of classical languages and had given much study to divinity. He was nominated to Dunfermline on 19 July 1560. He had Rosyth under his care in 1567, and in 1574 Carnock and Beath, Rosyth being excluded. He was a member of thirty-nine General Assemblies – from 25 June 1563 to 10 May 1597, and in two of these, 6 March 1572 and 24 October 1578, he was Moderator. He had a place on all the important committees of the Church, and assisted the Moderator in arranging the business of the Assemblies – a position analogous to a modern Convener of the Business Committee. He was one of the ministers who attended the Regent Earl of Morton at his execution on 2 June 1581. In 1576, and again in 1582, he was appointed Visitor or Commissioner for various districts in establishing kirks and settling ministers. He was frequently selected as intermediary when the Assembly wished to communicate matters of importance to the King, and he did not hesitate to admonish King James "to beware of innovations in Court, to try reports before credit was given to them, and to put him in remembrance of Holt, the English Jesuit." "He jocularly said that Fergus was the first King of Scotland, and that he was Fergus - son; but, recognising that King James had the possession, and was 'an honest man,' he would give him his right." By his tact and ready wit he was able to calm the more turbulent spirits, and upon one occasion he so effected a conciliation that when the ministers departed the King "laid his hands [shook hands] upon every one of them." At a meeting of Synod at Cupar in February 1597–8, Ferguson (then the oldest minister in Scotland) strongly opposed a proposal for giving ministers a vote in parliament, comparing it to a "busking up of the brave horse for the overthrow of Troy". He died Father of the Church on 23 August 1598. He is described as "a good preacher, wise, and of jocund and pleasant disposition". He had a remarkable knowledge of the Scottish vernacular, and many of his sayings lingered long in the speech of the people. A portrait of him painted on timber in a small oval, and presented by John Row to the University Library, Edinburgh, cannot now be traced.

== Life ==
His date of birth is debated, (Note: Ferguson is stated by John Spottiswoode to have been born about 1533, but Robert Wodrow supposes the date to have been ten or twenty years earlier, and David Laing thinks it could not have been later than 1525.) and he is reputed to have been a native of Dundee. (Note: The only evidence for this is an entry in the treasurer's accounts of Scotland 7 July 1558 of a summons to him and others within the borough of Dundee to appear before the justices at the Tolbooth on 28 July for disputing upon erroneous opinions and eating flesh during Lent.) Robert Wodrow states that he was by trade a glover, but gave up business and went to school, in order to fit himself for the duties of a preacher or expounder among the reformers. The Scottish doctor of the Sorbonne James Laing sneered at him as an ignorant cobbler (sutor) and glover. He was well acquainted both with Latin and Greek, and was among the earliest of the preachers of the reformed doctrines.

When the first appointment was made of ministers or superintendents for places in Scotland, he was selected to go to Dunfermline; in 1567 Rosyth was placed under his care, but in 1574 it was excluded, while Cumnock and Beith were added. Ferguson was chosen moderator of the general assembly which met at Edinburgh on 6 March 1573, and also of that which met on 24 Oct. 1578. He usually had a place on important commissions, and for many years was chosen one of the assessors to the moderator to prepare matters for the assembly.

He was one of the ministers who waited on James Douglas, 4th Earl of Morton before his execution, 2 June 1581. In 1582 he was appointed by the assembly a commissioner for the West of Fife, to superintend the establishment of kirks and placing of ministers. Ferguson formed one of a deputation to wait on James VI in 1583 to discharge the duty of admonishing him 'to beware of innovations in court', to check reports before credit was given to them, and remind him of the affair of the escaped Jesuit, William Holt. He jocularly told the king that Fergus was the first king of Scotland, and that he was Fergus-son; but recognising that King James had the possession and was an honest man he would give him his right. In the discussion warmth was displayed by some of the deputies, but Ferguson succeeded in giving a new turn to the topics at critical points, the result being that as they took their leave 'the king laid his hands upon every one of them.' In August of the same year Ferguson and six other ministers were cited by the king to attend a convention at St Andrews to answer for certain proceedings of the assembly.

On 12 May 1596, on the renewal of the covenant by the synod of Fife at Dunfermline, Ferguson gave an address, with reminiscences of his experiences of the early reform period. At a meeting of the synod of Fife, held at Cupar in February 1598, in regard to a proposal to give ministers a vote in parliament, Ferguson, the eldest minister at that time in Scotland, after relating pat difficulties of the church in contending against efforts to introduce episcopacy, opposed the proposal, which he compared to the 'busking up of the brave horse' for the overthrow of Troy. He died 13 August 1598.

His position as minister of Dunfermline was filled by John Fairfoul who translated from Aberdour to the east.<ref>Fasti Ecclesiae Scoticanae</ref>

== Works ==
In 1563 Ferguson published a reply to René Benoît, confessor to Mary Queen of Scots. (Note: 'An Answer to ane Epistle written by Renat Benedict, the French doctor, professor of God's word (as the translator of this epistle calleth him) to John Knox and the rest of his brethren, ministers of that word of God made by David Feargusone, minister of this same word at this present Dunfermline.') It was printed in Tracts by David Ferguson, edited by David Laing for the Bannatyne Club in 1860. On 13 January 1572 he preached a sermon before the Regent Mar at the meeting of the assembly in Leith, when a modified episcopacy was established. It protested against the alienation of the spoils of the church to the private uses of the nobility or to purposes of government, instead of their being applied to the establishment of churches and schools, and to meet the necessities of the poor; and was in vernacular Scottish. At the assembly held at Perth in August 1572 it was submitted to the revision of five ministers, all of whom gave it their approbation, after which it was printed at St. Andrews by Robert Lekprevick, the dedication to the Regent Mar bearing the date of 20 August. John Knox gave it his recommendation: 'John Knox with my dead hand but glad heart, praising God that of his mercy he leaves such light to his kirk in this desolation.' It is in the volume edited by Laing.

The epithet ‘Tulchan’ applied to the bishops is usually ascribed to him. He was famed for his skill in the vernacular language, which is celebrated by John Davidson, then one of the regents at St. Andrews. He made a collection of Scottish proverbs, published in 1641 under the title, 'Scottish Proverbs gathered together by David Fergusone, sometime minister at Dunfermline, and put ordine alphabetico when he departed this life anno 1598.' Other editions appeared in 1659, 1675, 1699, and 1706, the latter bearing the title, 'Nine Hundred and Forty Scottish Proverbs, the greater part of which were first gathered together by David Ferguson, the rest since added.' The James Carmichaell collection of proverbs in Scots was published by Edinburgh University in 1957 which includes some proverbs also collected by David Ferguson.

He was also the author of 'Epithalamium Mysticum Solomonis Regis, sive analysis critico-poetica Cantici Canticorum,’ Edinburgh, 1677. He left a diary containing a record of the principal ecclesiastical events of his time, which has been lost, but which probably his son-in-law, John Row (1568–1646), incorporated in his 'History.'

- An Answer to ane Epistle, written by Renat Benedict, the French Doctor, Professor of God's Word (as the Translator of this Epistle calleth him), to John Knox and the rest of his Brethren, Ministers of that Word of God, made by David Feargusone, Minister of this same Word at this present Dunfermline (Edinburgh, 1563) [the only copy known to exist was presented to the University Library, Edinburgh, in 1701, by John Row, but has been reprinted in Tracts by David Fergusson, edited by David Laing, LL.D., for the Bannatyne Club in 1860]
- Ane Sermon preichit befoir the Regent and Nobilitie upon a part of the Third Chapter of the Prophet Malachi, in the Kirk of Leith, etc. (St Andrews, 1572) [the only copy extant is in the Advocates' Library, Edinburgh, but it also has been reprinted in Laing's volume; another edition by John Lee, D.D., appeared about 1828];
- Scottish Proverbs : gathered together by David F. . . . and put ordine Alphabetico when he departed this Life, Anno 1598 (Edinburgh, 1641) [a copy is in the Advocates' Library, and an imperfect copy in the British Museum Library];
- Nine Hundred and Forty Scottish Proverbs, the greatest part of which were at first gathered together by David F. (Edinburgh, 1659, 1675, 1699, 1706);
- A Select Collection of Scots Poems . . . to which is added a Collection of Scots Proverbs by the Rev. David F. (Edinburgh, 1777, 1785);
- A Collection of English Proverbs . . . whereunto are added Local Proverbs . . . and Scottish Proverbs [the latter consisting of 38 pages, are acknowledged in the Preface to be Fergusson's Collection] (Cambridge, 1670, 1678; London, 1737, 1768, 1817). [The volume entitled Epithalamium Mysticum Solomonis Regis (Edinburgh, 1677) has been wrongly ascribed to David Ferguson It is the work of another David Ferguson of Kirkcaldy, who lived a century later.] He left a Diary containing a record of the chief ecclesiastical events of his time, which is believed to be the basis of his son-in-law John Row's History.

== Family ==
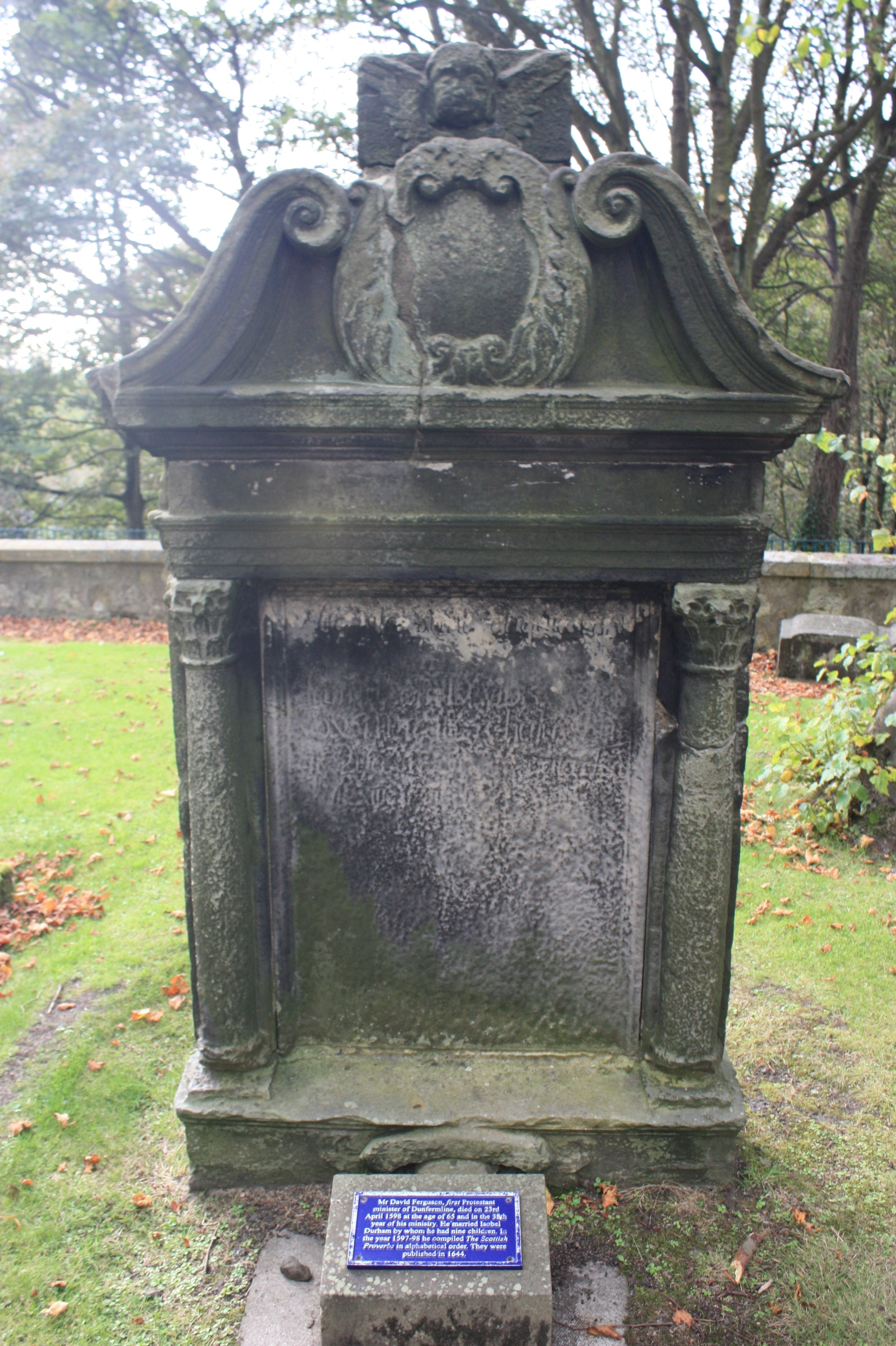
David Ferguson's grave, Dunfermline Abbey

For a fuller account of Ferguson's descendants see the introduction to Tracts.

He married Isobel Durham, and had issue —

- Margaret, baptised 31 May 1562 (married David Spens, minister of Kirkcaldy);
- William, physician, Dundee, baptised 10 September 1564, died 25 March 1627;
- Patrick, baptised 23 June 1566;
- Robert, baptised 3 October 1568;
- Janet, baptised 24 September 1570 (married April 1598, David Ramsay);
- David, baptised 21 January 1572–3;
- John, baptised 19 May 1574;
- Grisel, baptised 15 February 1575–6 (married John Row, minister of Carnock);
- Isobel, baptised 24 February 1579–80.

== Bibliography ==
- Calderwood's Hist., ii. 11, iii. 618, 717–19, v. 435, 681
- Row's Hist.
- Wodrow's Analecta, 120
- Laing's Introduction to Tracts (1860)
- Reg. Assig.
- M'Crie's Knox
- Fernie's Dunfermline
- Henderson's Proverbs
- Reg. of Deeds, xxix.
- James Melville's Diary, 236, 288
- Thomson's Dundee
