= John Roe =

John Roe may refer to:

- John Septimus Roe (1797–1878), English naval surveyor and explorer of Western Australia
- John Roe (footballer) (1938–1996), Scottish fullback
- John Roe (rugby union) (born 1977), Australian rugby union player
- John Roe (mathematician) (1959–2018), British mathematician.

== See also ==
- John Rowe (disambiguation)
- Roe (disambiguation)#People
