= Book of Discipline (Church of Scotland) =

Ecclesiastical books by John Knox

The Book of Discipline refers to two works regulative of ecclesiastical order in the Church of Scotland, known as The First Book of Discipline (1560) and The Second Book of Discipline (1578), drawn up and printed in the Scottish Reformation. The first was drafted by a committee of "six Johns", including leading reformer John Knox. It set out a system of Presbyterian polity on the Geneva model, but the lack of funds meant its programme of clerical organisation and education was largely abandoned. The second book was adopted after the forced abdication of Mary Queen of Scots and was much more clearly Presbyterian in outlook. It placed church supervision fully in the hands of groups of elected church leaders in presbyteries.

== Background ==
In 1560, following the death of the regent Mary of Guise, who ruled on behalf of her daughter Mary, Queen of Scots who was in France and the defeat of French forces at the Siege of Leith, the reform-minded Lords of the Congregation were in the ascendency in Scotland. The Parliament of Scotland met in Edinburgh 1 August 1560. Ignoring the provisions of the Treaty of Edinburgh, on 17 August, Parliament approved a Reformed Confession of Faith (the Scots Confession), and on 24 August it passed three acts of Parliament that abolished the old faith in Scotland. Under these, all previous acts not in conformity with the Reformed Confession were annulled; the sacraments were reduced to two (Baptism and Communion) to be performed by reformed preachers alone; the celebration of the Mass was made punishable by a series of penalties (ultimately death) and Papal jurisdiction in Scotland was repudiated. The Queen declined to endorse the acts that Parliament had passed and the new kirk existed in a state of legal uncertainty.

== First Book of Discipline ==
The Lords had intended for the parliament to consider a Book of Reformation, that they had commissioned and which was largely the work of John Knox. However, they were unhappy with the document and established a committee of "six Johns", including Knox, John Winram, John Spottiswood, John Willock, John Douglas and John Row, to produce a revised version. While Knox, Spottiswood and Willock were long committed Protestants, Windram, Douglas and Row had until recently been pillars of the Catholic establishment and the composition of the committee may have been intended as a compromise. However, the members worked well together and produced a radical plan for church reform. The result of the delay was that the document, known as the First Book of Discipline was not considered by the full parliament, but a thinly attended convention of nobles and about 30 lairds, in January 1561 and then only approved individually and not collectively.

The book set out a system of church order that included superintendents, ministers, doctors, elders and deacons. It also contained a programme of parish-based reformation that would use the resources of the old church to pay a network of ministers, a parish based school system, university education and arrangements for poor relief. However, the proposal for the use of church wealth were rejected and under an Act of Council, which kept two-thirds in the hands of its existing owners and even the remaining third had to be shared with the Crown. The result was an abandonment of the educational programme, ministers remained poorly paid and the church was underfunded.

== Second Book of Discipline ==
In July 1567, Mary was forced to abdicate in favour of her 13-month-old son James VI. James was to be brought up a Protestant and the government was to be run by a series of regents, beginning with James Stewart, 1st Earl of Moray, until James began to assert his independence in 1581. Mary eventually escaped and attempted to regain the throne by force. After her defeat at the Battle of Langside in May 1568, by forces loyal to the King's Party, led by Moray, she took refuge in England, leaving her son in their hands. In Scotland the King's Party fought a civil war on behalf of the king against his mother's supporters, which ended, after English intervention, with the surrender of Edinburgh Castle in May 1573. In 1578 a Second Book of Discipline was adopted, which was much more clearly Presbyterian in outlook. It placed church supervision fully in the hands of groups of elected church leaders, in presbyteries, synods and the general assembly.
