= Scots Confession =

Calvinist profession of faith

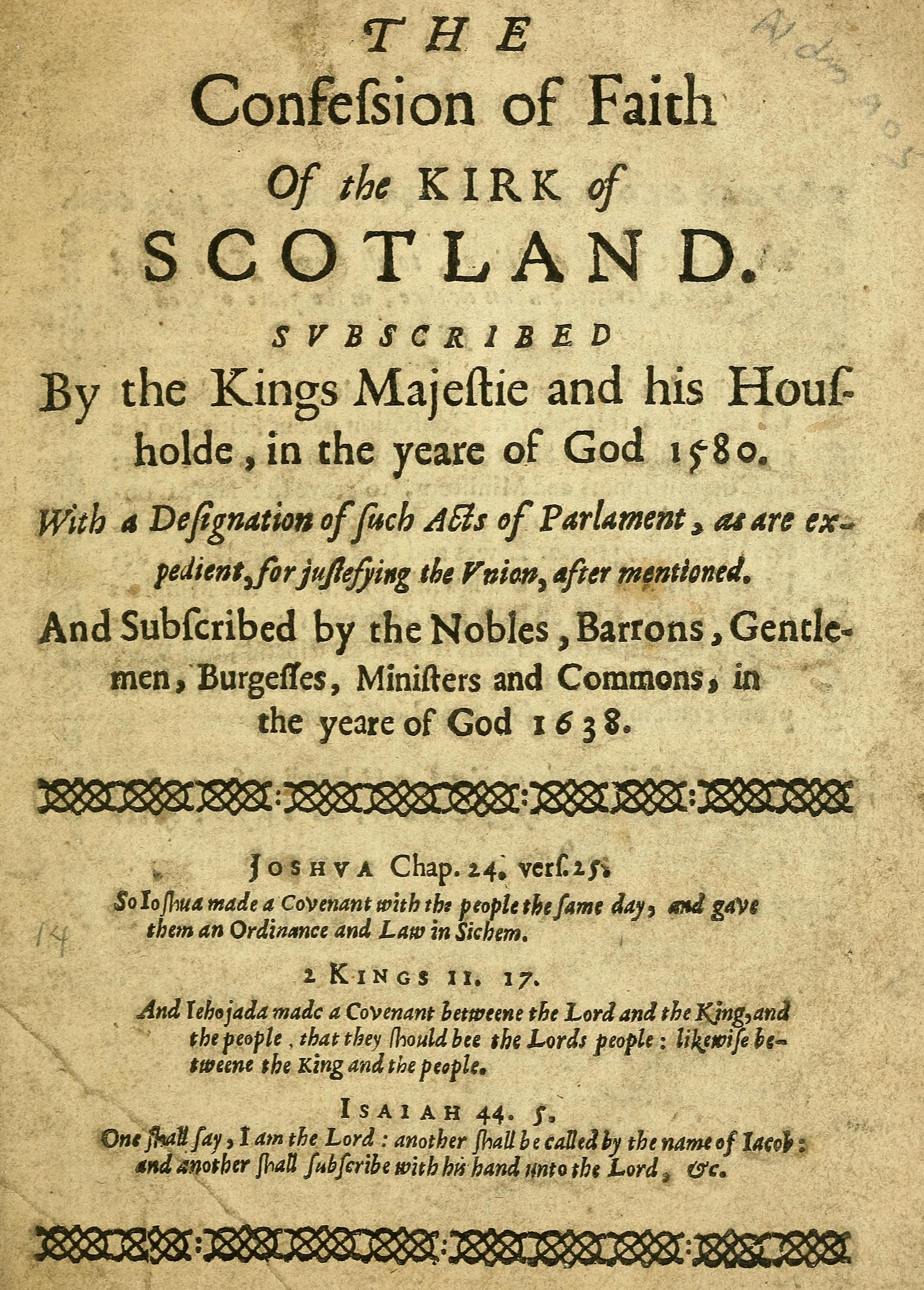
- Author: John Knox
- Language: English
- Genre: Confession
- Publication date: 1560
- Publication place: Scotland
- Text: Scots Confession at Wikisource

The Scots Confession (also called the Scots Confession of 1560) is a Confession of Faith written in 1560 by six leaders of the Protestant Reformation in Scotland. The text of the Confession was the first subordinate standard for the Protestant church in Scotland. Along with the Book of Discipline and the Book of Common Order, this is considered to be a formational document for the Church of Scotland during the time.

In August 1560 the Parliament of Scotland agreed to reform the religion of the country. To enable them to decide what the Reformed Faith was to be, they set John Knox as the superintendent over John Winram, John Spottiswood, John Willock, John Douglas, and John Row, known hereafter as "the Six Johns", to prepare a Confession of Faith. This they did in four days. The 25 Chapters of the Confession spell out a contemporary statement of the Christian faith as understood by the followers of John Calvin during his lifetime. Although the Confession and its accompanying documents were the product of the joint effort of the Six Johns, its authorship is customarily attributed to John Knox.

While the Parliament approved the Confession on 27 August 1560, acting outside the terms of the Treaty of Edinburgh to do so, Mary, Queen of Scots, a Roman Catholic, refused to agree, and the Confession was not approved by the monarch until 1567, after Mary's overthrow. It remained the Confession of the Church of Scotland until it was superseded by the Westminster Confession of Faith on 27 August 1647. However, the confession itself begins by stating that the Parliament "ratifeit and apprevit [the confession] as wholesome and sound doctrine grounded upon the infallible truth of God's word"; thus, though changes within societies may have diminished its relevance, believers hold that the authority of its statements is rooted not in parliamentary approval but in, as it says, "the infallible truth of God's word".

In 1967, it was included in the United Presbyterian Church in the U.S.A.'s Book of Confessions alongside various other confessional standards, and remains in the current Presbyterian Church (U.S.A.)'s Book of Confessions.

Confession of Faith Ratification Act 1560
- Act of Parliament
- Parliament of Scotland
- Long title: The Confessioun of fayth professed and beleued be the protestantis within the Realme of scotland publischeit be thame in parliament and be the estaitis thairof ratifeit and apprevit as hailsome and sound doctrine groundit vpoune the infallibill trewth of godis word.
- Citation: 1560 c. 1

Dates
- Royal assent: 24 August 1560

Text of the Confession of Faith Ratification Act 1560 as in force today (including any amendments) within the United Kingdom, from legislation.gov.uk.

As the Confession of Faith Ratification Act 1560, the Confession remains part of Scots law.
