= Carnock =

Village and parish of Fife, Scotland

Coordinates: 56.084°N 3.540°W

Carnock: Scottish Gaelic: Cèarnag
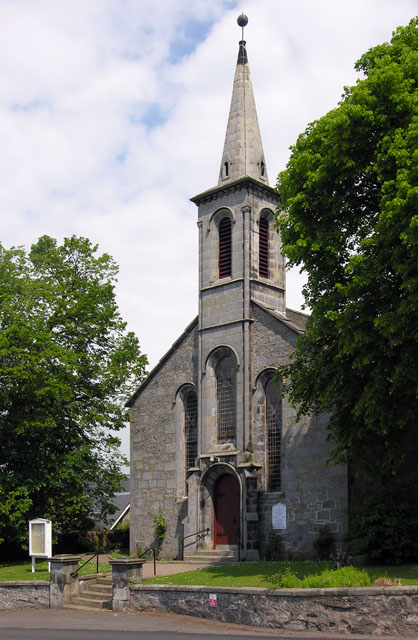
- Carnock Parish Church

- Location within Fife
- Population: 790 (2020)
- OS grid reference: NT042890
- Council area: Fife
- Country: Scotland
- Sovereign state: United Kingdom
- Police: Scotland
- Fire: Scottish
- Ambulance: Scottish
- UK Parliament: Dunfermline and Dollar
- Scottish Parliament: Dunfermline
- Website: http://carnockgowkhall.wix.com/home#

Carnock (Scottish Gaelic: Cèarnag, lit. 'at the corner') is a village and parish of Fife, Scotland, 4 1/4 miles (7 kilometres) west of Dunfermline. It is 1 1/4 miles (2 kilometres) east of Oakley, Fife. The civil parish had a population of 5,927 as of 2011.

== History ==
Carnock is derived from the Gaelic ceàrn ('corner') + the locational suffix -òc (common among Celtic place names) meaning 'corner place, place at or in a corner'. This may refer to the location of the medieval parish church, immediately south of a sharp bend in the Carnock Burn.

Carnock first appears in the historical record when its church was granted to the Hospital of St Mary of Loch Leven by Bishop William of St Andrews between 1225 and 1236. Along with Moonzie, it was one of the only two churches attached to that hospital, which later became part of the Trinitarian firary at Scotlandwell. It may have been a very early Christian site, given the discovery of early carved stone, found built in to the later, thirteenth century parish church.

After the Reformation in 1560 the church in Carnock was under the control variously of Saline to the north and Dunfermline to the east. Only in 1592 did it get its own minister, the ecclesiastical historian John Row, who served the parish until 1645. He was succeeded by Rev George Belfrage who translated from Culross in 1647. He died and was replaced by John Shaw in 1664 who was translated to Kinnaird, Perthshire in 1679. His successor Thomas Marshall was deprived of office in 1689 for not signing the National Covenant. William Innes was minister 1693 to 1696. In 1699 James Hog took over and was a noted theological author. Daniel Hunter succeeded him in 1730, also serving as chaplain to the local family of Col Erskine. He died in 1739.

The parish was then overseen by Rev Thomas Gillespie from 1741 to 1752. Thomas Gillespie was founder of the Relief Synod which was latterly incorporated into the United Presbyterian Church. Gillespie was followed by Rev Thomas Adie in 1753 who died in 1780 and was replaced by Rev Alexander Thomson who died in 1826 to be replaced briefly by Robert Thomson. In 1827 Rev William Gilston took over. Gilston was responsible for the building of the new church in 1840 but moved to the Free Church of Scotland in the Disruption of 1843 and was minister there until death in 1881 (a ministry in Carnock of 55 years!). Meanwhile the Church of Scotland placed Rev Adam Black Douglas in their church from 1843.

In 1774 upon Carneil hill, near Carnock, several urns containing Roman coinage were discovered.

== Notable places ==
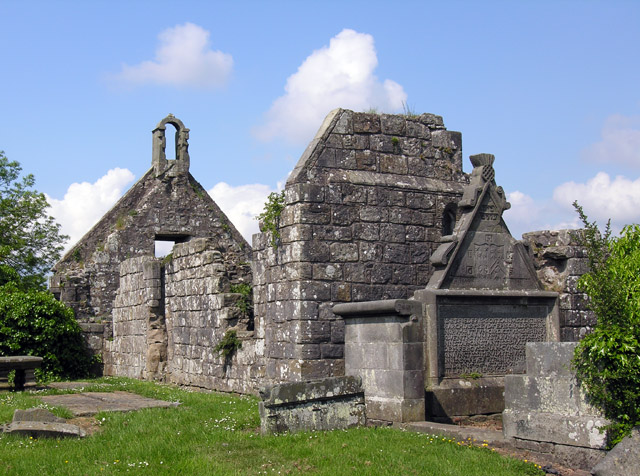
The old parish church and monument to John Row

On the Main Street of Carnock lies a Parish church which was built in 1840, though in the nearby kirkyard lies the remains of the original 12th-century church which was rebuilt in 1602.

Nextdoor to the church is Carnock Primary School, this school serves both Carnock and Gowkhall. The school was built in 1864 with an extension added in 1912 by James Shearer and another in 2007. The main building consists of 4 classrooms and a medway hut used for various purposes.

Carnock Olympian:- Former pupil at Carnock Primary was Debbie Knox part of the Gold Medal winning team at the Winter Olympics in Curling at Salt Lake City. She did come back to the school to show her Medal to the pupils and crown the Gala Queen.

On Main Street is the 16th-century The Carnock Inn, one of the oldest buildings in the village, which became a public house in 1884. Next door to the Pub is a local craft shop / studio in what used to be the village Post Office . Now Oakley serves as the Post Office for Carnock.

The village also boasts a Community Centre built in 2005 and available for hire via Fife council.

== Transport ==
The village has two bus stops.

- Eastbound Traveline Code : 34325459
- Westbound Traveline Code : 34325439

Services run from Dunfermline bus station serving Gowkhall, Oakley and Saline, Fife.

== See also ==
Carnock's listed buildings
