= Treaty of Edinburgh =

Anglo-French treaty ending the siege of Leith, 1560

The Treaty of Edinburgh (also known as the Treaty of Leith) was a treaty drawn up on 5 July 1560 between the Commissioners of Queen Elizabeth I of England with the assent of the Scottish Lords of the Congregation, and the French representatives of King Francis II of France (husband of Mary, Queen of Scots) to formally conclude the siege of Leith and replace the Auld Alliance with France with a new Anglo-Scottish accord, while maintaining the peace between England and France agreed by the Treaty of Cateau-Cambrésis.

== French and English troops in Scotland ==
The rule of Mary of Guise in Scotland was supported by French troops. Scottish Protestants challenged her rule in the Reformation Crisis. During the ensuing Siege of Leith, French troops fortified the port and town of Leith against an English and Scottish Protestant force. The English army was invited into Scotland by the Treaty of Berwick made by the Lords of the Congregation. The treaty was concluded on 6 July 1560 just short of a month after the death of Mary of Guise. The fortifications at Leith, Inchkeith and Dunbar Castle were duly removed, and the French garrisons left Scotland. Other conditions discussed involved the joint use of English and French heraldry by Mary, Queen of Scots.

Remains of an artillery fort involved in the siege were found in 2006 in Edinburgh's Pilrig Park, and two gun emplacements can be seen on Leith Links.

== Terms of the treaty ==
Royal arms of Mary, Queen of Scots, France and England

The representatives were Jean de Monluc, Bishop of Valence, and Charles de la Rochefoucault, Sieur de Randan, for France, with William Cecil and Nicholas Wotton, Dean of Canterbury and York. The French deputes were authorised to discuss the withdrawal of their troops with the Archbishop of St Andrews, John Bellenden of Auchnoul, and William Maitland as representatives of the Congregation. The French delegation was also permitted to meet and console the bereaved ladies-in-waiting of Mary of Guise's court. The cessation of hostilities during the negotiation was marked by two cannon shots from Edinburgh Castle at 7 o'clock in the evening of Monday 17 June.

It was agreed between France and England that all their land and naval forces would withdraw from Scotland. Mary and Francis II of France should not use the arms and signs of England and Ireland in their heraldry. Mary and Francis would fulfill the representations made by the nobility and people of Scotland on 6 July 1560.

== Ratification ==
Royal arms of Mary, Queen of Scots and France (post-treaty)

The terms of this treaty are occasionally confused with the acts of the Reformation Parliament of 1560 which met in August, and sought to establish the Protestant church in Scotland. However the treaty was not ratified by Mary Stuart, the reigning Scottish monarch at the time, despite considerable pressure upon her until 1567. Even so, it had the intended effect of the withdrawal of French troops from Scotland at the time, and the eventual fall of the Catholic Church in Scotland.

Mary may not have wanted the Treaty to be ratified, as she was heavily attached to France, having been its queen consort, and viewed the Lords of the Congregation as rebels against her mother Mary of Guise. She also did not ratify the treaty because it officially declared Elizabeth the monarch of England, a position Mary desired for herself. The Gowrie Regime attempted to ratify the treaty in April 1583.

== See also ==
- List of treaties
