= William Row =

Scottish Presbyterian minister (1563–1634)

Personal details
- Born: 1563
- Died: October 1634 (aged 70–71)
- Denomination: Christian
- Education: St. Andrews

William Row (1563–1634) was a Scottish presbyterian divine.

== Early life and education ==
William Row was born in 1563. He was the second son of John Row, the reformer and minister of Perth. His mother was Margaret, daughter of John Beaton of Balfour in Fife. He had ten brothers and two sisters. Thomas, the eldest died young and William had another older brother, James, who became minister of Kilspindie. William studied at the University of St. Andrews, where he graduated in 1587.

== Early ministry ==
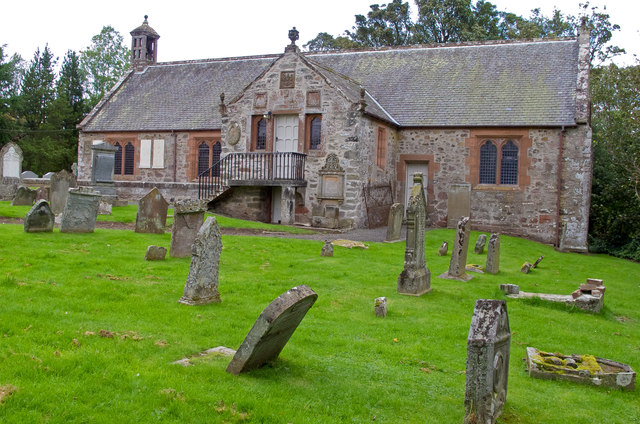
Forgandenny Church

Two or three years after graduation he was appointed minister at Forgandenny, on 6 March 1589. His predecessor at Forgandenny was John Row, a cousin of his father. By the act of the Privy Council, he was one of five charged with the maintenance of the true religion throughout the bounds of Perth, Stormont, and Dunkeld (Masson, Reg. P. C. Scotl. iv. 466). On the occasion of the Gowrie conspiracy, Row was one of the ministers who refused to give thanks publicly for the king's delivery until the fact of the conspiracy should be proven, and he was consequently cited to appear at Stirling before the king and council. On the plea that his life was in danger, an effort was made to deter him from obeying the summons. Nevertheless, he went to Stirling and boldly defended himself, arguing that Andrew Henderson, the Earl of Gowrie's chamberlain, and alleged would-be assassin of the king, had been not punished but rewarded.

== Subsequent ministry and controversies ==
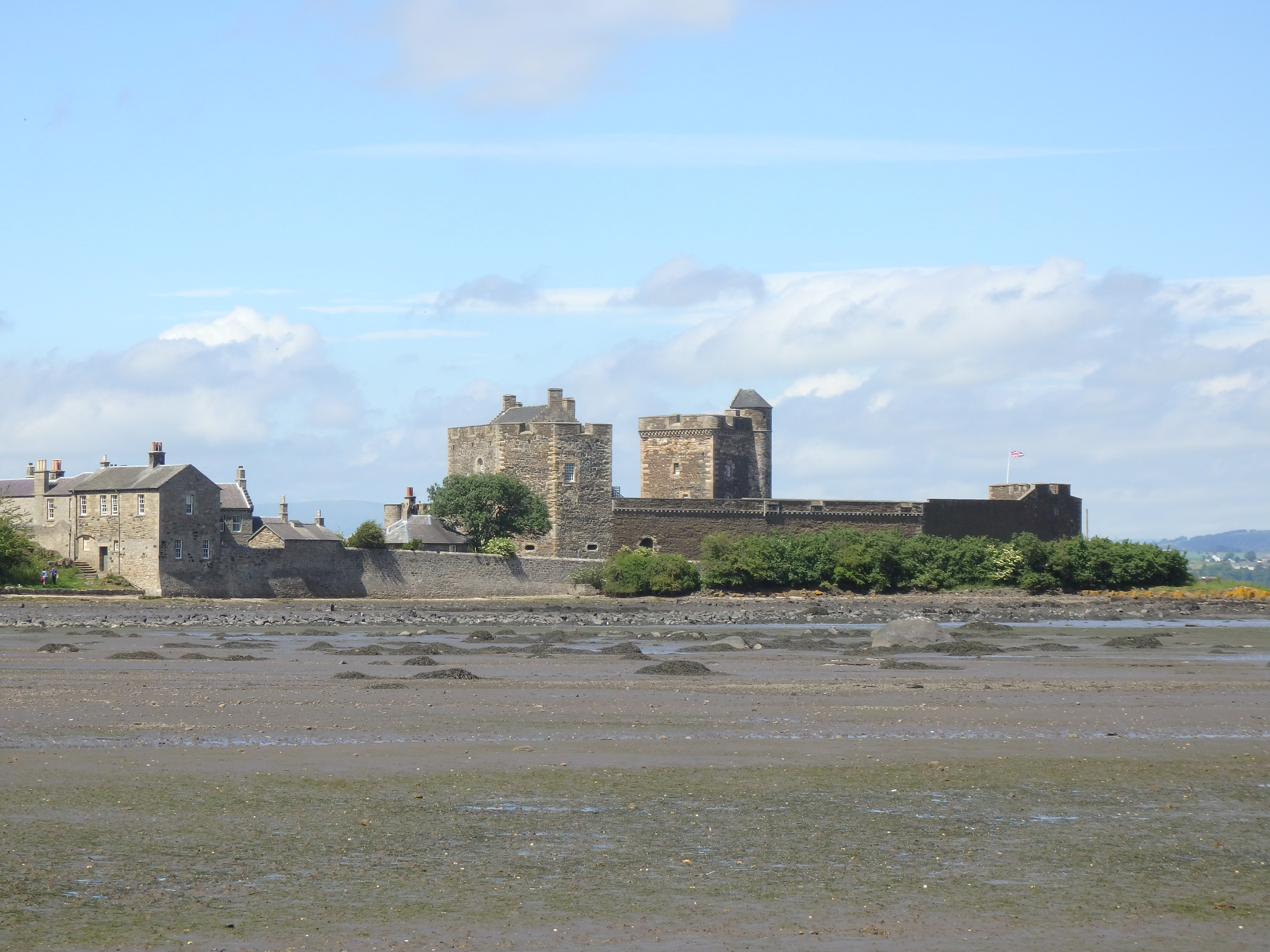
Blackness Castle

He was a member of the assembly held in 1602, and also joined in the protest against the proposed restoration of episcopacy, which was presented at the first session of the parliament which met at Perth on 1 July 1606. In 1607 he was moderator of the synod held at Perth, to which James VI sent the captain of his guards, Lord Scone, to compel the acceptance of a permanent moderator. Scone threatened Row that if he opposed the scheme ten or twelve of his guards would discharge their culverins at him. Row, nothing daunted, preached from ten till two, bitterly inveighing against the proposed appointment. Scone did not understand Latin, but, on being informed of Row's meaning, severely rebuked him. He was ultimately put to the horn, and summoned before the privy council. Failing to appear, in June 1607 he was arrested and imprisoned in Blackness Castle (ib. vii. 349n., 350n., 385–91, 522, viii. 7, 421, 434, ix. 258). On the petition of the assembly he was released in June 1614, and in 1624, through the favour of Alexander Lindsay, Bishop of Dunkeld, patron of the parish, and an old fellow-student of Row, his son William was appointed his assistant and successor. It is said that he refused, even under these circumstances, to recognise the ecclesiastical supremacy of his old friend, placing their former regent, John Malcolm, now minister of Perth, at the head of his table, instead of the bishop. Row died in October 1634.

== Biographical data ==
WILLIAM ROW (primus), born 1563, second son of John Row, minister of Perth; educated at University of St Andrews; Graduated with an M. A. (1587); was appointed one of five by the Privy Council, 6 March 1589, for the maintenance of true religion in the bounds of Perth, Stormont, and Dunkeld; was one of forty-two ministers who signed the Protest to Parliament, 1 July 1606, against introduction of Episcopacy. For having, as Moderator of Synod at the previous meeting, opened their meeting at Perth 7 April 1607, in opposition to the King's Commissioner, by a sermon from 10 a.m. to 2 p.m., he was put to the horn at the instance of the King's Advocate, summoned before the Privy Council 9 June, found guilty, and warded in Blackness Castle at his own expenses. The Assembly of 1608 solicited his release, and the King granted the same 16 June 1616. He died at the Manse of Tillicoultry October 1634.

== Family ==
He married Jean Blair, eldest daughter of Rev Blair of Irvine. They had six children -

- William, his successor in the charge
  - [WILLIAM ROW (secundus), son of preceding; educated at Univ. of Edinburgh; M.A. (22 July 1616); became teacher of a song-school in Stirling in 1620; ord. (assistant) by Alexander, Bishop of Dunkeld, 29 June 1624; was a member of the Commission of Assembly in 1648; died suddenly on his way to the Synod at Stirling April 1658, aged about 62. He was a zealous Covenanter, and accompanied the Scottish Army to England, as chaplain to Sir James Lumsdaine's regiment in 1646. He marr. and had issue – William, served heir 5 Nov. 1658; Thomas; John, apprenticed to Thomas Row, merchant, Edinburgh, 1 June 1659; Robert, apprenticed to David Scott, apothecary, Edinburgh, 9 July 1662. Edin. Apprentice Reg.; Army Accounts; Inq. Ret. Perth, 674; Lamont's Diary, 106.]
- a son who went to Ireland
- Thomas, collector at Bo'ness
- James of Chesters, merchant in Leith, died December 1701
- Margaret (married Samuel Row, minister at Sprouston)
- Janet (married James Traill, lieutenant in the Castle of Stirling)

== Bibliography ==
- Nisbet's Heraldic Plates, 120
- Scott's Reformers
- Melvill's Autobiography 741, 761
- Row's History
