= John Douglas (archbishop of St Andrews) =

English archbishop (c.1500–1574)

The Most Reverend John Douglas
- Archbishop of St Andrews
- Church: (1) Roman Catholic (2) Church of Scotland
- In office: 1572–1574

Orders
- Consecration: 10 February 1572

Personal details
- Born: c1500 Longnewton, Roxburghshire
- Died: October 1576
- Parents: Robert Douglas
- Education: University of Paris

John Douglas (c. 1500 – 1574) was Protestant Archbishop of St. Andrews from 1571 to 1574. As was tradition from the fifteenth to the seventeenth centuries, the Archbishop also took on the role of Chancellor of the University of St Andrews, as the University had strong links with the Pre-Reformation church.

== Life ==
John Douglas, was born in Longnewton, Roxburghshire, the 'bastard son natural of quondam' Robert Douglas. Letters of legitimation were granted on 2 January 1563–64. He graduated at University of Paris, where he was a fellow-student of Archibald Hay in Montague College. He was probably the "magister Johannes Douglas," who matriculated from the Psedagogium on 25 June 1523. He was appointed by Queen Mary prior to 1 October 1547, on which date the commendator and sub-prior gave notice of the appointment to the vicar of Tynninghame and the curates of Inchbryok and Tannadice, with instructions to announce it in their respective churches, the revenues of these churches being part of the endowment of the College. He was made rector of the University, 1551–73. Douglas was one of the "Six Johns" who wrote the First Book of Discipline and the Scots Confession of 1560.

He was consecrated Archbishop of St Andrews 10 February 1572. He was first to hold a Protestant Episcopate in Scotland. He died in October 1576.

Religious titles
Preceded by Gavin Hamilton	Archbishop of St. Andrews; 1572–1574	Succeeded by Patrick Adamson
Academic offices
Preceded by John Hamilton; Archbishop of St Andrews	Chancellor of the University of St Andrews; 1572–1574	Succeeded by Patrick Adamson; Archbishop of St Andrews
