= John Row (minister, born 1568) =

Scottish Presbyterian minister (1568 – 1646)

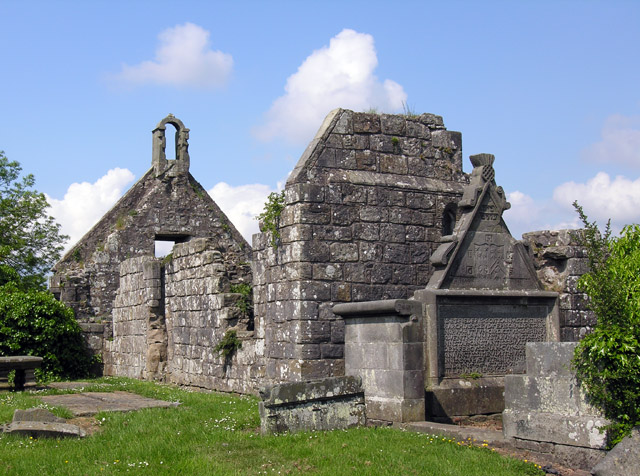
- Church ruin and monument to John Row

Personal details
- Born: 1568
- Died: 26 June 1646 (aged 77–78)
- Denomination: Church of Scotland

John Row (1568 – 26 June 1646) was a Scottish ecclesiastical historian and one of the Scottish Reformers. As minister of Carnock in Fife, he was a leading opponent of Episcopacy. Row's Historie of the Kirk of Scotland (1558–1637), left by him in manuscript, is an original authority for the period. An account of his life is attached to the work.

Born Perth; his baptism is recorded as having taken place 6 January 1568–9. He was the third son of John Row, the Reformer, minister of Perth. John was educated by his father; he was so precocious that he knew Hebrew at the age of seven, and read daily after dinner or supper portions of the Old Testament in the original. On the death of his father in 1580, his brother William and he received friar's pensions from the King's Hospital at Perth. At fifteen he became schoolmaster of Kennoway and tutor to his cousins, sons of Beaton of Balfour, whom he accompanied to Edinburgh University in 1586. He graduated with an M.A. 1 August 1590. Shortly afterwards he was elected schoolmaster of Aberdour, and was tutor to William, Earl of Morton. He continued his studies in divinity, and towards the end of 1592 he was ordained to this Carnock. He was one of the forty-five ministers who signed a Protest to Parliament, 1 July 1606, against Episcopacy, and in the same year, at Linlithgow, he met with the ministers who were to be put on their trial for holding the Assembly at Aberdeen in disobedience to the King's command. In 1616 he declined a presentation to Aberdour, and later, a call to Culross. In 1619, and again on 29 December 1621, he was summoned before the Court of High Commission for non-conformity and opposition to Prelacy. He was prevented by illness from obeying the former summons, but was represented by a son and a nephew. Sir George Bruce of Carnock also intervened on his behalf and sent a letter by one of his servants, Richard Christie, to the Archbishop. The Archbishop deposed two ministers but dealt more leniently with Row, who was simply "confined to his own congregation." Richard Christie claimed as much credit for the light sentence as Row's other friends: "After sundry arguments, Christie came on with one weightie argument," saying, "thir coals in your mines are very evil, and my master (Bruce) hath very many good coals: send up a vessel every year to Culross, and I shall see her laden with good coals." After Row had been restricted to his small parish he organised the Communion services which gave Carnock a celebrity among the parishes of Scotland. This it retained for upwards of two hundred years. At a Communion in 1635 it is said there were no fewer than seventeen tables. Row was a member of the Glasgow Assembly of 1638, when he was appointed one of a committee of ministers "come to years" to enquire— from personal knowledge of the handwriting of clerks and their own recollection of events — into the authenticity of certain Assembly Records which had been missing for some time, the result being that their genuineness was established. By the same Assembly he was named one of a committee for considering such constitutions and laws "as might prevent corruptions in the future, like those which had troubled the Kirk in the past." He died on 26 June 1646.

== Life ==
He was the third surviving son of John Row, a Scottish reformer, and Margaret Beaton of Balfour; he was born at Perth about the end of December 1568, and baptised on 6 January 1569. He received early instruction from his father, and at the age of seven was reading Hebrew. Sent to Perth Grammar School, he instructed the master in Hebrew, who on this account was accustomed to call him Magister John Row.

On the death of his father in 1580, Row, then about twelve years of age, received, as did his brother William Row, a friar's pension from the King's hospital at Perth. Subsequently, he obtained an appointment as schoolmaster at Kennoway, and tutor to his nephews, the sons of Beaton of Balfour. He accompanied them in 1586 to Edinburgh, enrolling himself as student in the university. After taking his M.A. degree in August 1590, he became schoolmaster of Aberdour in Fife; he was towards the close of December 1592 ordained minister of Carnock, in the presbytery of Dunfermline.

Row signed on 1 July 1606 the protest of the Scottish Parliament against the introduction of episcopacy; and he was also one of those who in the same year met at Linlithgow with the ministers who were to be tried for holding an assembly at Aberdeen, contrary to the royal command. In 1619, and again in 1622, he was summoned before the court of high commission for nonconformity to the Articles of Perth, and required to confine himself within the bounds of his parish.

He was a member of the general assembly of 1638, when he was named one of a committee of ministers to inquire—from personal knowledge of the handwriting of the clerks and their own memory of events—into the authenticity of certain registers of the general assembly that had been missing for some time. He was able to establish their authenticity. By the same general assembly, he was also named to a committee to construct such constitutions and laws as might prevent corruptions like those that had troubled the kirk in the past.

He died on 26 June 1646, and was buried in the family burial-place at the east end of the church of Carnock, where there was a monument to his memory.

== Epitaph ==
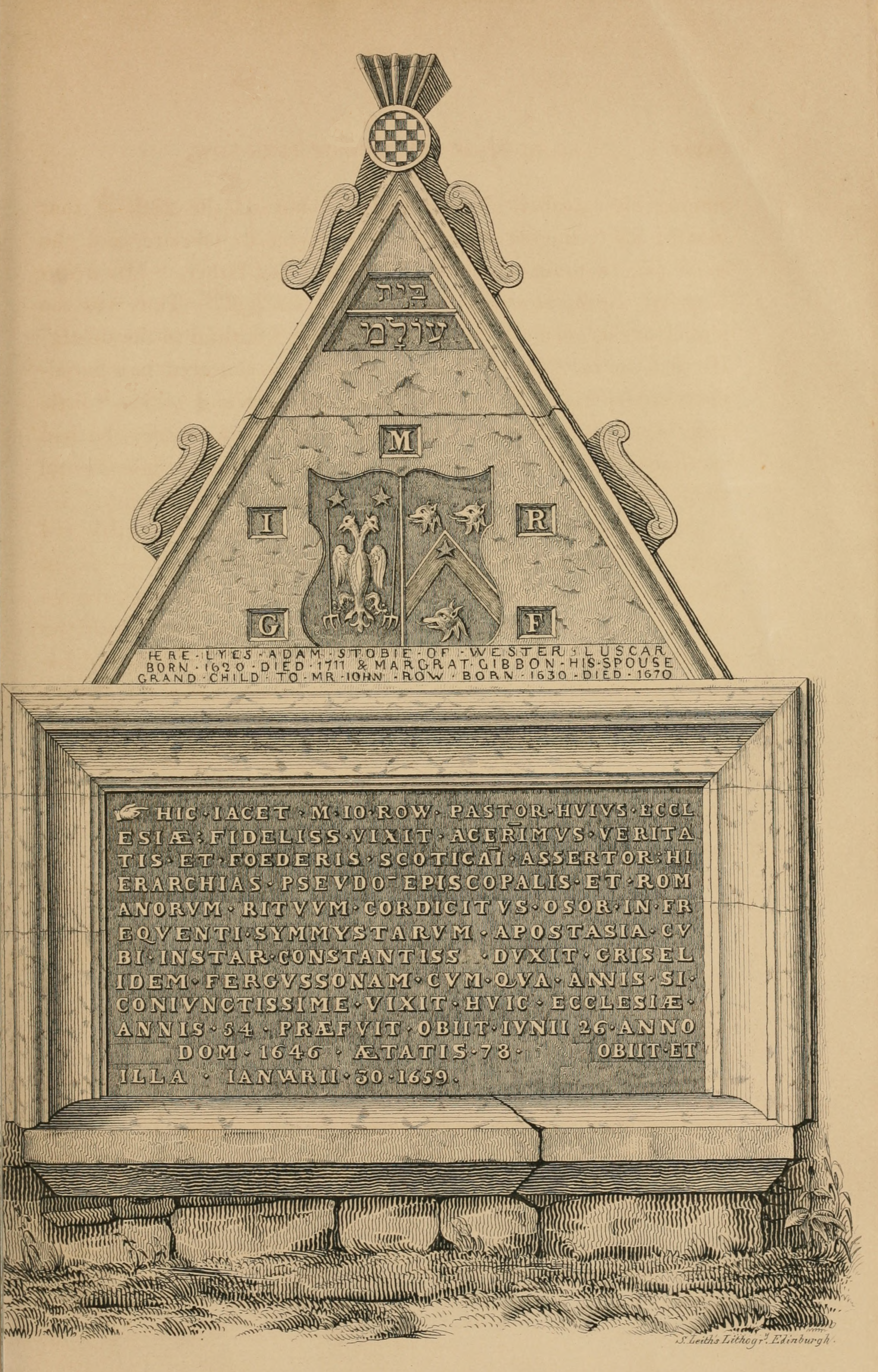
monument to John Row of Carnock

He died 26 June 1646, after a few days' illness, and was buried at the east end of Carnock Church, where a monumental stone was erected to his memory. This monument is surmounted by a Scottish thistle, immediately over which are the Hebrew words for "The Last House," and the following Latin inscription:

"Hic Iacet M. Jo. Row, Pastor hujus eccl
esise fidelissimus : vixit acerrimus verita
tis et foederis Scoticani assertor : hi
erarchias pseudo-episcopalis et Rom
anorum rituum cordicitus osor : in fr
equenti symmistarum apostasia cu
bi instar constantissimus."

In "Memorials of the Family of Row" there is to be found this other epitaph :
Though bald with age, and prest with weight,
In crooked times this man went straight :
His pen kept hid things on record
For which the Prelats him abhorr'd :
And his Carnock, his little quarter
For Canterbury he would not barter."

== Family ==
He married 4 January 1595 Grizel (died 30 January 1659), described as "a verie comelie and beautifull young woman," daughter of David Fergusson, minister of Dunfermline, and had issue —

- David, a minister in Ireland, "who was obliged to return to Scotland after a residence of twenty-five years, fifteen of which he had spent in the ministry, with a wife and five children without means of support, because of persecution and oppression from Papists who burned, slew, and did all the hurt they could to those that fled not";
- John, Principal of King's College, Aberdeen;
- Robert, minister of Abercorn;
- William, minister of Ceres;
- Katherine (married (1) cont. 1 September 1627, Robert Alison, merchant burgess, Dunfermline : (2) John Messone, burgess of Culross);
- Elizabeth (married cont. 4 April 1623, William Gibbon, indweller in Banhaird);
- Margaret (married David Robertson, of Murton-Elginch, and was great-great-grandmother of Principal Robertson, the historian)

== Works ==
- The Historie of the Kirk of Scotland from the year 1558 to August 1637, with a Continuation to July 1639 by his son John Row, Principal of King's College, Aberdeen. [Row's Historie, based on papers left by his father-in-law, David Fergusson, found its way into circulation by means of several manuscript copies, one of which — in Edinburgh University Library — was first printed by the Wodrow Society (Edinburgh, 1842), an edition being printed also that same year for the Maitland Club, 2 vols.

In his later years Row compiled a memorial of on the government of the Church of Scotland since the Reformation. For the earlier years of his Memorial he made use of the papers of his father-in-law David Ferguson. The work found its way into circulation in manuscript, and copies of it were made. In 1842 it was printed for the Wodrow Society, chiefly from a manuscript in the university of Edinburgh, under the title ‘Historie of the Kirk of Scotland, from the year 1558 to August 1637, by John Row, Minister of Carnock, with a Continuation to July 1639, by his son, John Row, Principal of King's College, Aberdeen.’ An edition was also printed in the same year by the Maitland Club.

== Bibliography ==
- Memorials of the Family of Row [edited by James Maidment] (Edinburgh, 1828)
- Baillie's Letters, i., 129
- Gordon's Scots Affairs, i. 147, ii. 127
- Notes prefaced to the Historie
- Livingstone's Characteristics
- Chalmers's Dunfermline, ii.
- Ross's Aberdour and Inchcolme, 220, 229
- Cunningham's Culross, 92-4
- Beg. of Deeds, ccccxvii. 53, ccclxxiii. Ill
- Perth Sas., v., 137
