= John Row (MP) =

Member of the Parliament of England for Totnes

John Row or Rauf (fl. 1388) of Totnes, Devon, was an English politician.

He was a member (MP) of the parliament of England for Totnes in February 1388.
