= John Spottiswood (reformer) =

Scottish Presbyterian minister (1510–1585)

John Spottiswood or Spottiswoode or Spotiswood or Spotswood

Personal details
- Born: 1510
- Died: 1585 (aged 74–75)
- Denomination: (1) Roman Catholic (2) Church of Scotland
- Parents: William Spottiswood of Spottiswood; Elizabeth Pringle
- Spouse: Beatrix Crichton
- Children: John Spottiswoode; James Spottiswood; William Spottiswood; Rachel Spottiswood; Judith Spottiswood
- Education: Glasgow

John Spottiswood (1510–1585) was a religious reformer in 16th-century Scotland.

Spottiswood went to London, where he imbibed the principles of the Reformation from Archbishop Cranmer. He returned to Scotland in 1543, and was presented by Sir James Sandilands of Calder in 1548. He joined the Reformers in 1560, and was one of six elected for drawing up the First Book of Discipline, and Confession of Faith. He became Superintendent of Lothian on 9 March 1561. In 1562, the parishioners complained to the General Assembly that Spottiswood's duties as Superintendent prevented him discharging all his duties of minister of the parish. The reply was that owing to the rarity of ministers it could not be otherwise, and that "the profit of many churches was to be preferred to the profit of one." He died on 5 December 1585. His son relates that he was "a man well esteemed for his piety and wisdom; loving and beloved of all persons, charitable to the poor, and careful above all things to give no man offence."

== Life ==
John Spottiswood (various spellings) was a Scots reformer and Church of Scotland superintendent for Lothian. He was born in 1510, the second son of William Spottiswood of Spottiswood (killed at the Battle of Flodden on 9 September 1513), by wife Elizabeth Pringle, daughter of Henry Hop-Pringle of Torsonce. The family trace back to Robert Spottiswood who possessed the Barony of Spottiswood, Berwickshire, in the reign of Alexander III. John Spottiswood was incorporated in the University of Glasgow in 1534, and graduated MA in 1536. He intended to study for the church, but the persecution of heretics in Glasgow gave him such a distaste for theology (Woodrow, Collections, i. 72) that in 1538 he went up to London with the intention of applying himself to some other business. Here, however, he came under the influence of Archbishop Cranmer, who admitted him to holy orders. He remained in London till 1543, when he returned with the Scots nobles taken prisoners at Solway Moss, residing mostly with the Earl of Glencairn. In 1544 he was employed by the Earl of Lennox in negotiations with Henry VIII relative to the marriage of Lennox to Lady Margaret Douglas, the king of England's niece. By Sir James Sandilands, a zealous reformer, he was in 1547 presented to the parsonage of Calder comitis (now divided into the parishes of Mid-Calder and West Calder). No doubt he became an intimate friend of Knox when Knox stayed some time with Sir John Sandilands at Calder House in 1555; and he seems to have been altogether dominated by Knox's personality. In 1558 he accompanied Lord James Stewart, afterwards the Regent Moray, to witness the marriage of Queen Mary of Scotland to the dauphin of France. On the institution of ecclesiastical superintendents by parliament in July 1560, he was nominated superintendent of Lothian and Tweeddale (Knox, i. 87), and he was admitted in the following March without resigning his charge at Calder. He was also in 1560 named one of a committee to draw up the First Book of Discipline. In Quentin Kennedy's "Compendious Ressonyng" in support of the mass, he is referred to as profoundly "learnit in the mysteries of the New Testament" (Knox, Works, vi. 167). As the superintendent of Lothian and Tweeddale—which included Edinburgh and the most important part of southern Scotland—Spottiswood was a prominent figure in the ecclesiastical politics of the time, although rather as the mere representative of other leaders—Knox, of course, especially—than as himself a leader. The fact that on several occasions he wished to be relieved of the duties of superintendent would seem to indicate that personally he would have much preferred a quiet life at Calder. True, he gave as a reason that he had received no stipend; but it was not the stipend that he craved.

On the birth of James VI Spottiswood was deputed by the general assembly in June 1566 to congratulate Queen Mary, and to desire that the prince "might be baptised according to the form issued in the Reformed Church"—a request that was not granted. After the queen's imprisonment in Lochleven and the resignation of the government, he officiated at the coronation of the young king at Stirling on 29 July 1567, placing the crown on his head, assisted by the superintendent of Angus and the bishop of Orkney. After Mary's flight to England he directed a letter to the lords who "had made defection from the king's majesty," in which he affirmed that God's just judgment was come upon the kingdom mainly because the queen's escape had not been prevented by her execution, "according as God's law commanded murderers and adulterers to die the death;" and exhorted all the supporters "of that wicked woman" in whom, he insinuated, "the devil himself had been loosed," to return to "the bosom of the Kirk" on pain of excommunication; but Calderwood justly states that the "letter must have been penned by Mr. Knox, as appeareth by the style". Indeed, the mild superintendent was incapable of anything so vehement. In 1570 he was, at the instance of Knox, sent by the kirk session of Edinburgh to admonish Kirkcaldy of Grange, who held the castle for the queen, of "his offence against God" but without any effect. At the assembly held in April 1576 a complaint was made against him of having inaugurated the bishop of Ross in the abbey of Holyrood House, although admonished by the brethren "not to do it;" but the assembly proceeded no further against him after he had admitted his fault. Although he had repeatedly asked to be relieved of the duties of superintendent, he was retained in the office until the close of his life. As, however, he had received no stipend for several years, he obtained on 16 December 1580 a pension of 45l. 9s. 6d. for three years, and the pension was renewed on 26 November 1583 for five years. He died 5 December 1585. According to his son, "in his last days, when he saw the ministers take such liberty as they did, and heard of the disorders raised in the church through that confused parity which men laboured to introduce, as likewise the irritation the king received by a sort of foolish preachers, he lamented extremely the case of the church to those who came to visit him," and "continually foretold that the ministers in their follies would bring religion in hazard" (Spottiswood, History, ii. 336–7).

== Family ==
He married Beatrix Crichton, daughter of Patrick Crichton of Lugton and Gilmerton, who survived him, and had issue:

- John Spottiswoode his successor, the historian
- James Spottiswood D.D., Bishop of Clogher, Ireland, born 7 September 1567, died (buried) 31 March 1644-5
- William Spottiswood
- Rachel Spottiswood, married James Tennent of Linhouse
- Judith Spottiswood, died before 1593 (Reg. of Deeds, xliv., 438)

== Bibliography ==
- Douglas's Bar
- Reg. Assig
- Knox's Works, ii
- Test. Reg
- Booke of the Kirk
- Wodrow's Biog. and Miscell
- Pitcairn's Cr. Trials, ii
- Spottiswood's, Calderwood's, Row's, Cook's, and Hetherington's Hists
- New Stat. Acc, i
- M'Ure's Glasg
- Chalmers's Caledonia, ii
- Knox's Works
- Histories of Calderwood and Spottiswood
