= John Row (reformer) =

Scottish Presbyterian minister (1526?–1580)

Personal details
- Born: c.1526
- Died: 16 October 1580
- Denomination: (1) Roman Catholic (2) Church of Scotland
- Education: St. Andrews

John Row (c.1525–1580), was a Scottish reformer, born around 1526 near Dunblane. He was educated at the Grammar School of Stirling and St Leonard's College, St Andrews, where he matriculated in 1544. After graduating with an M.A. he studied Canon Law and practised as an advocate in the Consistory Court of St Andrews. In 1550, he was appointed agent for the Scottish clergy at Rome, where he remained seven or eight years. He was awarded Licentiate of Laws (20 February 1556), and LL.D. Padua. The fame of his talents and learning led to his intimacy with Pope Paul IV and some of the cardinals, and would probably have led to his promotion; but owing to ill-health he was compelled to return to Scotland, when he was appointed nuncio to investigate the causes of the Reformation and to devise means for checking its progress. He reached Eyemouth on 29 September 1558, but finding himself unable to fulfil his injunctions, returned to Rome before 11 May 1559. After a short residence there, he came back by persuasion of James, Prior of St Andrews, afterwards Earl of Moray, and having seen the falsehood and imposition of a pretended miracle at St Allaret's Chapel, Musselburgh, he joined the Reformers. He was admitted to Kennoway in April 1560, before the Reformation was fully established. John Row was one of six ministers appointed by the Lords of the Congregation for "writing in a book their judgments touching the Reformation of religion." These appeared in the Confession of Faith and First Book of Discipline. He was translated to Perth (by consent of the General Congregation of Edinburgh) 17 July, and admitted before 20 December 1560. He was appointed by the General Assembly, 10 July 1568, to visit Galloway. He was styled Commissioner of Nithsdale and Galloway, March 1570 and elected Moderator of the General Assembly 21 July and 25 December 1567, 24 April 1576, and 11 June 1578. He died on 16 October 1580, at which time he held the vicarages of Twynholm and Terregles in Galloway. He was regarded as "a cautious and prudent reformer, of moderate views, benevolent disposition, and amiable and winning manners, a wise and grave father, of good literature according to the time." He was skilled in the original languages of Scripture, and did much towards building up the Reformed Church in Scotland. He was married in 1560 to Margaret, second daughter of John Beaton of Balfour.

== Education in Scotland and Rome ==
John Row (1526?–1580), Scottish reformer, was descended from a family supposed to have been of English origin. Born about 1525 at Row, he was educated at the grammar school of Stirling, and in 1544 matriculated at St. Leonard's College, St. Andrews. He devoted himself specially to the study of the civil and canon law, and shortly after taking the degree of M.A., commenced to practise as an advocate in the consistorial court of St. Andrews. In 1550 he was sent to Rome specially to represent the interests of John Hamilton, Archbishop of St Andrews, at the papal court; and in various letters to the pope he is referred to as procurator of the see of St. Andrews (Notes PP in M'Crie's Life of Knox), one part of his mission being to obtain, in opposition to the Archbishop of Glasgow, the confirmation of the powers of the archbishop of St. Andrews as primate and legatus natus of Scotland. The ability with which he discharged the duties of his commission commended him to the special notice of Guido Ascanio Sforza, Cardinal of Sancta Flora, as well as to Julius III and his successor, Paul IV. On 20 July 1556 he was made licentiate of laws of the university of Rome, and subsequently, at the request of Cardinal Sforza, he accepted the degree of LL.D. from the University of Padua. He seemed marked out for high preferment in the Romish church when, his health showing symptoms of failing, he determined to return to Scotland, and was therefore named papal nuncio to examine into the cause of the spread of heretical opinions in Scotland, and to advise as to the best means of checking them. His inquiry resulted in his conversion to Protestantism. He arrived in Scotland on 29 September 1558, and returned to Rome some time prior to 11 May 1559. But shortly afterwards he was induced by James Stuart, afterwards Earl of Moray, to leave Rome for Scotland.

== Conversion to Protestantism ==
Row was first led to entertain doubts regarding things he'd been taught by discovering—through the information of John Colville of Cleish, known as Squire Meldrum—a fraud practised by the priests at the chapel of Our Lady at Loretto, Musselburgh, in pretending to have restored the sight of a boy who they falsely affirmed had been born blind. Some time afterwards Row began to attend the preaching of Knox, which finally confirmed him in the Reformed faith; and having formally joined the reformers, he was in April 1560 admitted minister of Kennoway (not Kilconquhar, as sometimes stated) in Fife. He also held the vicarage of Kennoway, but demitted it some time before 23 January 1573. When the appointment of ministers and superintendents to the chief towns and districts of Scotland was made, in July 1560, Row was appointed minister of the Old or Middle Church, Perth. He entered upon his duties there prior to 20 December, when he was present as minister of Perth in the first meeting of the general assembly of the church of Scotland (Calderwood, ii. 41).

== Row the polyglot ==
While on the continent, Row, besides acquiring a knowledge of French and Italian, had mastered Greek and Hebrew. He is supposed to have been the first to teach the Hebrew language in Scotland, and he also instructed the master of the grammar school of Perth—then one of the most famous in Scotland—in Greek. Several of the sons of noblemen and gentlemen attending the academy were boarded in Row's house, and he instructed them in Greek, Hebrew, and French. The last was the only language used in conversation in Row's house, and the Scriptures were read in Hebrew, Greek, Latin, French, and English (Appendix to Rowe's History of the Kirk of Scotland).

== Row's theology and career ==
Row was one of a commission of six men (all named John) appointed in April 1560 to draw up the sum of the doctrine "necessary to be believed and received within the realm". The result, written in four days, is now known as the Scots Confession and was the "Confession of Faith," ratified by the estates in July 1560, and printed in 1561. After the meeting of the estates the same commission was appointed to draw up "the form of church polity" known as the "First Book of Discipline." He supported the proposal to deprive Queen Mary of the mass in 1561 (Knox, ii. 291). In 1564 he was appointed one of a committee of ministers to hold a conference with the lords as to the advisability of the ministers moderating their language in their reference to the queen in prayers and sermons; but the conference was without result (ib. p. 424). Shortly before the queen's marriage to Darnley, Row was, at a meeting of the assembly (25 July 1565), appointed a commissioner to present to the queen at Perth certain articles in reference to religion, that she might ratify them in parliament; and in December he was appointed by the assembly to pen a reply to the queen's answers (printed in Calderwood's History, ii. 296–9). After the marriage he was also, with other commissioners, sent to request the queen and king to take steps for securing that the third of the benefices should be paid to the ministers, and that the mass and all 'idolatry' should be abolished (Knox, ii. 517). In 1566 he was appointed, along with the superintendent of Lothian, to take steps that the gift of the third of the benefices, which the queen had promised, "might be despatched through the seals" (ib. p. 538). In December of this year he also subscribed the letter sent to the bishops of England regarding the wearing of the surplice (Calderwood, ii. 335). He was chosen moderator of the assembly which met at Edinburgh on 20 July 1567, shortly after the queen's imprisonment at Loch Leven, and also of the assembly which met at Perth in the following December. By the latter assembly he was named a commissioner to treat on the affairs of the kirk (ib. p. 396). On 6 July 1568 he was appointed by the general assembly to visit Galloway while the Bishop of Galloway was under censure (ib. p. 424), and in March 1570 he is styled commissioner of Galloway (ib. iii. 38). On the petition of the kirk in reference to benefices being rejected by the parliament of the king's party at Stirling, in August 1571, Row, preaching on the Sunday following, "denounced judgments against the lords for their covetousness" (ib. iii. 138). At the assembly convened at Edinburgh on 6 March 1573 complaint was laid against him for having a plurality of benefices, and for solemnising a marriage betwixt the master of Crawford and the daughter of Lord Drummond "without proclaiming the banns and out of due time" (ib. iii. 273). In answer to the first charge he admitted that he had two vicarages, but affirmed that he reaped no profit from them. These vicarages were Twynam and Terregles, in the stewartry of Kirkcudbright. On the second charge he was found guilty, and commissioners were appointed to deal with him and his session (ib).

== Later years ==
Row in 1574 was appointed one of a commission to "convene and write the articles which concern the jurisdiction of the kirk" (ib. p. 307), and in the following year was named one of a commission to confer with the commissioners that might be appointed by the regent "upon the jurisdiction and policy of the kirk" (ib. p. 344). The result of these and other commissions of which Row continued to be a member was the construction of the "Second Book of Discipline." At a meeting of a commission of the assembly in July 1575, when the question was raised "whether bishops, as now allowed in Scotland, had their function from the Word of God," Row was chosen, with three others, to argue in favour of episcopacy; but he was so impressed with the arguments urged in favour of presbytery that he afterwards "preached down prelacy all his days." He was chosen moderator of the assembly which met at Edinburgh on 9 July 1576, and also of that which met at Stirling on 11 June 1578. He died at Perth on 16 October 1580.

== Family ==
By his wife Margaret, daughter of John Beaton of Balfour in Fife, he had ten sons and two daughters:

- Thomas, died young
- James, minister of Kilspindie, bapt. 25 June 1562
- William, minister of Forgandenny, born 1563
- Oliver, died young
- John (1568–1646), minister of Carnock, bapt. 6 January 1568
- Robert
- Archibald, minister of Stobo, bapt. 23 March 1571
- Patrick, died young
- Colin, minister of St. Quivox, baptised 1 March 1576
- Henry, died young
- Catherine, married to William Rigg of Athernie, merchant, Edinburgh), died 15 December 1615
- Mary, married to Robert Rynd, minister of Longforgan.

== Legacy ==
Calderwood describes Row as "a wise and grave father, and of good literature according to the time," and states that "he thundered out mightily against the estate of the bishops, howbeit in the time of blindness the pope was to him as an angel of God" (ib. p. 479). He is credited in the memoir by his son with the authorship of a book on the "Signs of the Sacrament," no copy of which is known to be extant.

== Bibliography ==
- Biography in Appendix to his son John's History of the Kirk of Scotland
- Histories of Knox, Calderwood, and Spotiswood
- James Melville's Diary (Wodrow Soc.)
- Edin. Tests.
- Reg. of Deeds, vii., ix.
- Zurich Lett., ii.
- Nisbet's Heraldic Plates, 120
- Acts of Pari., vii., 35, 105
- Fittis's Eccles. Annals of Perth, 105
- Calderwood's Hist., ii., 41, 296
- Forbes- Leith's Pre-Reformation Soldiers in Scotland
