= Catholic Church in Scotland =

- Scottish Gaelic: An Eaglais Chaitligeach ann an Alba; Scots: Catholic Kirk in Scotland
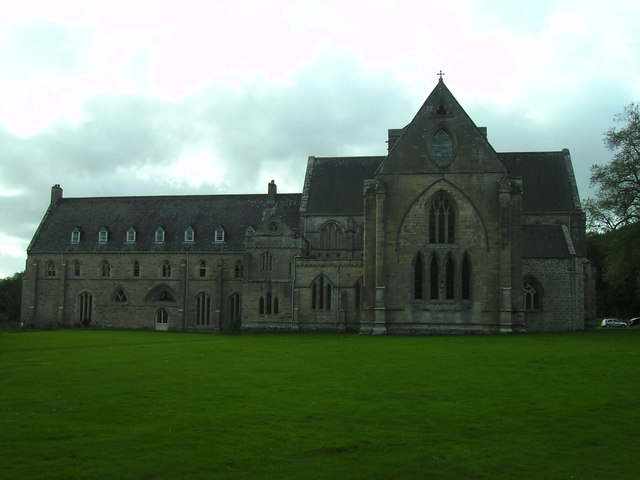
- The Pluscarden Abbey is the only medieval Benedictine Catholic abbey in Scotland still in operation today.
- Classification: Catholic
- Orientation: Latin
- Scripture: Bible
- Theology: Catholic theology
- Polity: Episcopal
- Governance: BCOS
- Pope: Leo XIV
- President: John Keenan
- Apostolic Nuncio: Miguel Maury Buendía
- Region: Scotland
- Language: English, Latin
- Founder: Saint Ninian, Saint Mungo, Saint Columba
- Origin: c. 200s: Christianity in Roman Britain c. 400s: Medieval Christianity
- Separations: Church of Scotland
- Members: 841,053 (2011) (Note: "people who stated they were Roman Catholic" in the 2011 census)
- Official website: bcos.org.uk

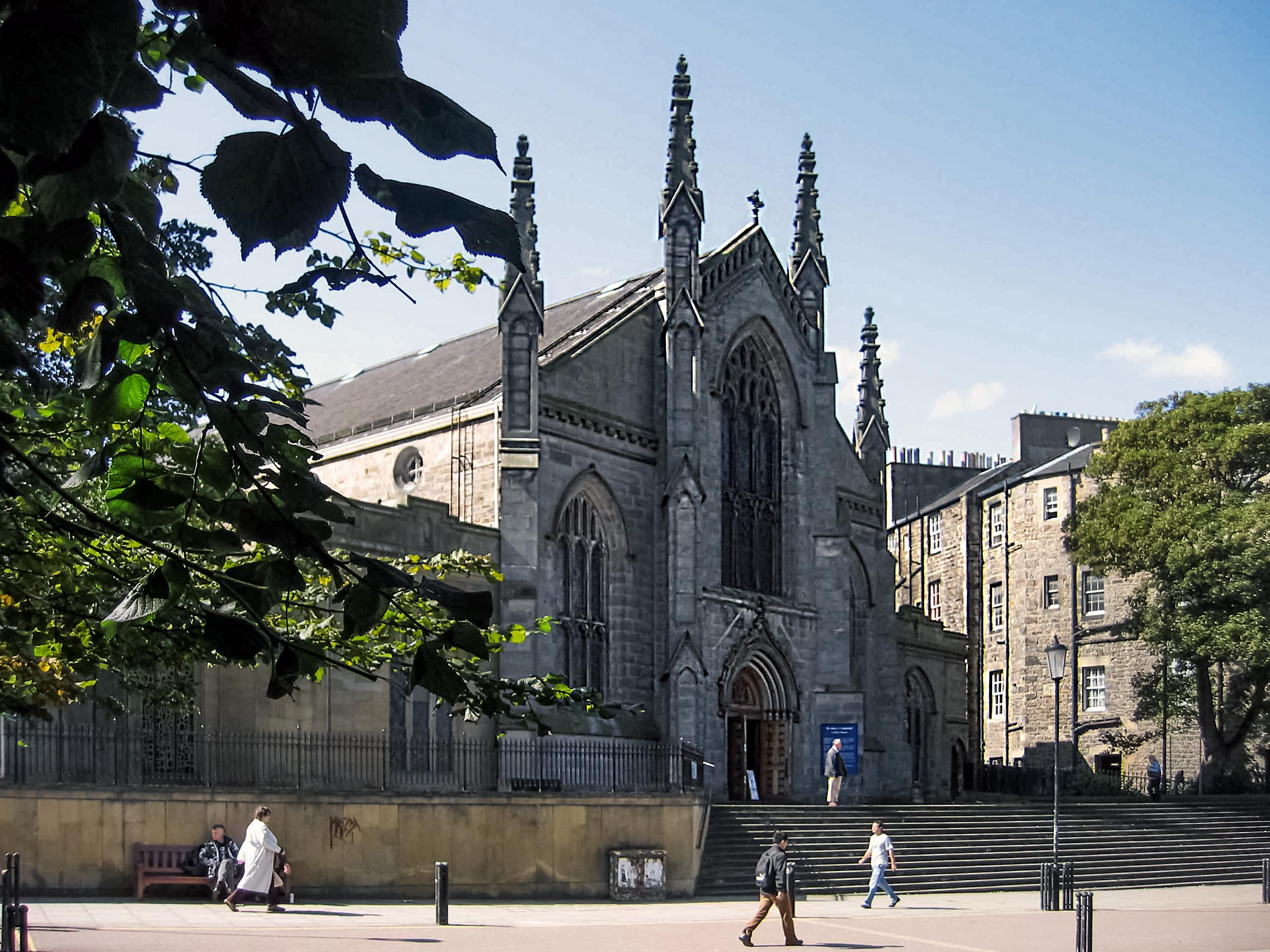
St Mary's Metropolitan Cathedral, Edinburgh

The Catholic Church in Scotland, overseen by the Scottish Bishops' Conference, is part of the worldwide Catholic Church headed by the Pope. Christianity first arrived in Roman Britain and was strengthened by the conversion of the Picts through both the Hiberno-Scottish mission and Iona Abbey. After being firmly established in Scotland for nearly a millennium, the Catholic Church was outlawed by the Scottish Reformation Parliament in 1560. Multiple uprisings in the interim failed to reestablish Catholicism or to legalise its existence. Even today, the Papal Jurisdiction Act 1560, while no longer enforced, still remains on the books.

Throughout the nearly three centuries of religious persecution and disenfranchisement between 1560 and 1829, many students for the priesthood went abroad to study while others remained in Scotland. In what is now termed underground education, many attended illegal seminaries. An early seminary upon Eilean Bàn in Loch Morar was moved during the Jacobite rising of 1715 and reopened as Scalan seminary in Glenlivet. After multiple arson attacks by government troops, Scalan was rebuilt in the 1760s by Bishop John Geddes, who later became Vicar Apostolic of the Lowland District, a close friend of national poet Robert Burns, and a well-known figure in the Edinburgh intelligentsia during the Scottish Enlightenment.

The successful campaign that resulted in Catholic emancipation in 1829 helped Catholics regain both freedom of religion and civil rights. In 1878, the Catholic hierarchy was formally restored. As the Church was slowly rebuilding its presence in the Gàidhealtachd, the bishop and priests of the Roman Catholic Diocese of Argyll and the Isles, inspired by the Irish Land War, became the ringleaders of a direct action resistance campaign by their parishioners to the Highland Clearances, rackrenting, religious discrimination, and other acts widely seen as abuses of power by Anglo-Scottish landlords and their estate factors.

Many Scottish Roman Catholics in the heavily populated Lowlands are the descendants of Irish immigrants and of Scottish Gaelic-speaking migrants from the Highlands and Islands who both moved into Scotland's cities and industrial towns during the nineteenth century, especially during the Highland Clearances, the Highland Potato Famine, and the similar famine in Ireland. However, there are also significant numbers of Scottish Catholics of Italian, Lithuanian, Ukrainian, and Polish descent, with more recent immigration to Scotland from European Union member states again boosting the numbers. Owing to immigration (overwhelmingly White European), it is estimated that in 2009, there were about 850,000 Catholics in the country of 5.1 million.

The Gàidhealtachd has been both Catholic and Protestant in modern times. A number of Scottish Gaelic-speaking areas, including Barra, Benbecula, South Uist, Eriskay, and Moidart, are predominantly Catholic.

In the 2011 UK Census, 16% of the population of Scotland described themselves as being Roman Catholic, compared with 32% affiliated with the Church of Scotland. Between 1994 and 2002, Catholic church attendance in Scotland declined 19% to just over 200,000. By 2008, the Catholic Bishops' Conference of Scotland estimated that 184,283 attended Mass regularly. Mass attendance has not recovered to the numbers prior to the COVID-19 pandemic, though there was a dramatic rise between 2022 and 2023.

== History ==
=== Establishment ===
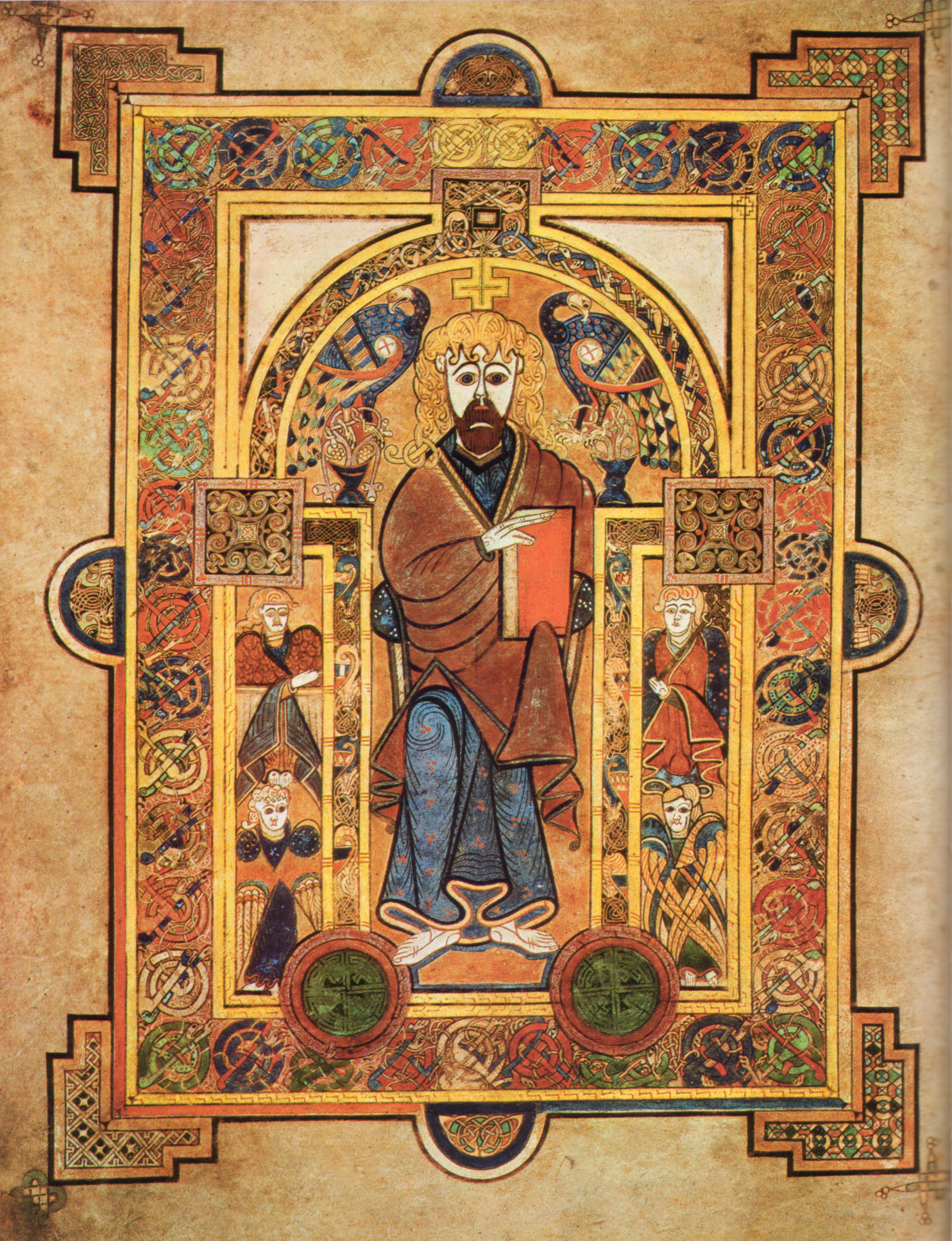
An illuminated page from the Book of Kells, which may have been produced at Iona Abbey, around 800

Christianity may have been introduced to what is now Scotland by soldiers of the Roman Legions stationed in the far north of the province of Britannia. Even after the 383 withdrawal of the Roman garrisons by Magnus Maximus, it is well documented in sources about Saint Mungo, St Ninian, and in locally composed works of early Welsh-language literature, like Y Gododdin, the Book of Taliesin, and the Book of Aneirin, that Christianity survived among the Proto-Welsh-speaking kingdoms in Scotland, which are still referred to in Modern Welsh as the Hen Ogledd (lit. "the Old North"). Like it's faithful, however, Christianity was slowly driven westward with refugees from the Anglo-Saxon invasion of Britain. The Picts, Anglo-Saxons, and Gaels of modern Scotland, who were traditionally tribal peoples, were mainly evangelized and converted between the fifth and seventh centuries by Irish missionaries such as Sts Columba and Baithéne, the founders and first two abbots of Iona Abbey, St Donnán of Eigg, and St Máel Ruba, a monk from Bangor Abbey who became the founder of Applecross Abbey in Wester Ross. These missionaries tended to found monastic institutions, which expanded to include schools, libraries, and collegiate churches whose priests both evangelized and served large areas. Partly as a result of these factors, some scholars have identified a distinctive Celtic Church, to which Catholics, Protestants, Miaphysite Orthodox, and Eastern Orthodox, have all claimed in historical debates to be the only legitimate heirs. In the Celtic Church, attitudes towards clerical celibacy were more relaxed, a differing form of monastic tonsure was used, the use of prayer beads known as the Pater Noster cord as a means of "prayer without ceasing" preceded the invention of the rosary by St Dominic, and the lunar method was used for calculating the date of Easter. During the 1960s, Frank O'Connor explained that the reason why, on both sides of the Irish Sea, abbots were often more significant than bishops is because a Church governed by an Episcopal polity, "in a tribal society was a contradiction in terms. No tribe, however small or weak, would accept the authority of a bishop from another tribe; but with a monastic organisation, each tribe could have its own monastery, and the larger ones could have as many as they wished."

Also, despite a shared belief in the Real Presence in the Eucharist, the veneration of the Blessed Virgin, and shared use of the Ecclesiastical Latin liturgical language, as is documented by primary sources such as the Stowe Missal, there were often significant differences between the Celtic Rite and the mainstream Roman Rite and evidence of a distinctive form of Celtic chant in Latin, which is most closely related to Gallican chant, also survives in liturgical music manuscripts dating from the period. The Culdees, an eremitical order from Gaelic Ireland, also spread to Scotland, where their presence continued at least into the 11th-century. In his life of Saint Margaret of Scotland, Turgot of Durham, Bishop of St Andrews, wrote of the Culdees, "At that time in the Kingdom of the Scots there were many living, shut up in cells in places set apart, by a life of great strictness, in the flesh but not according to the flesh, communing, indeed, with angels upon earth."

At the same time, the erenagh system in Gaelic Ireland of hereditary lay administration of Church lands by family branches deliberately appointed from within the derbhfine of local Irish clan chiefs led to notorious abuses; like monasteries warring against each other and the infamous Irish "royal-abbot" of Cork and Clonfert Abbeys, Fedelmid mac Crimthainn, who personally led armies into battle against other Irish clans and abbeys and routinely sacked and burned other monasteries. Due to the close ties between the Church in both countries, the erenagh system also spread to Gaelic Scotland, with at least some similar results. For example, during the 11th-century reign of the Scottish High King Macbeth, which was later fictionalized by William Shakespeare, the High King's greatest domestic foe by far proved to be his own uncle, Crínán of Dunkeld, the warrior-abbot of Dunkeld Abbey, Mormaer of Atholl, the legitimately married father of the late High King Duncan I, the grandfather of King Malcolm III of Scotland, and progenitor of the Scottish Royal House of Dunkeld.

Despite the ongoing religious persecution and expulsion from their monasteries and convents of "Romanists" like St Mo Chota, who opposed how much the Celtic Church had been, "absorbed by the tribal system" and lost its independence from control by local secular rulers, at least some of these issues had been resolved on both sides of the Irish Sea by the mid-seventh century. After the conversion, successful war for political independence from Norway, and increasing Gaelicisation of Scandinavian Scotland and the Isle of Man under Somerled and his heirs, the Roman Rite Diocese of the Isles under bishops appointed by the Holy See became the dominant religion.

=== Medieval era and Renaissance ===
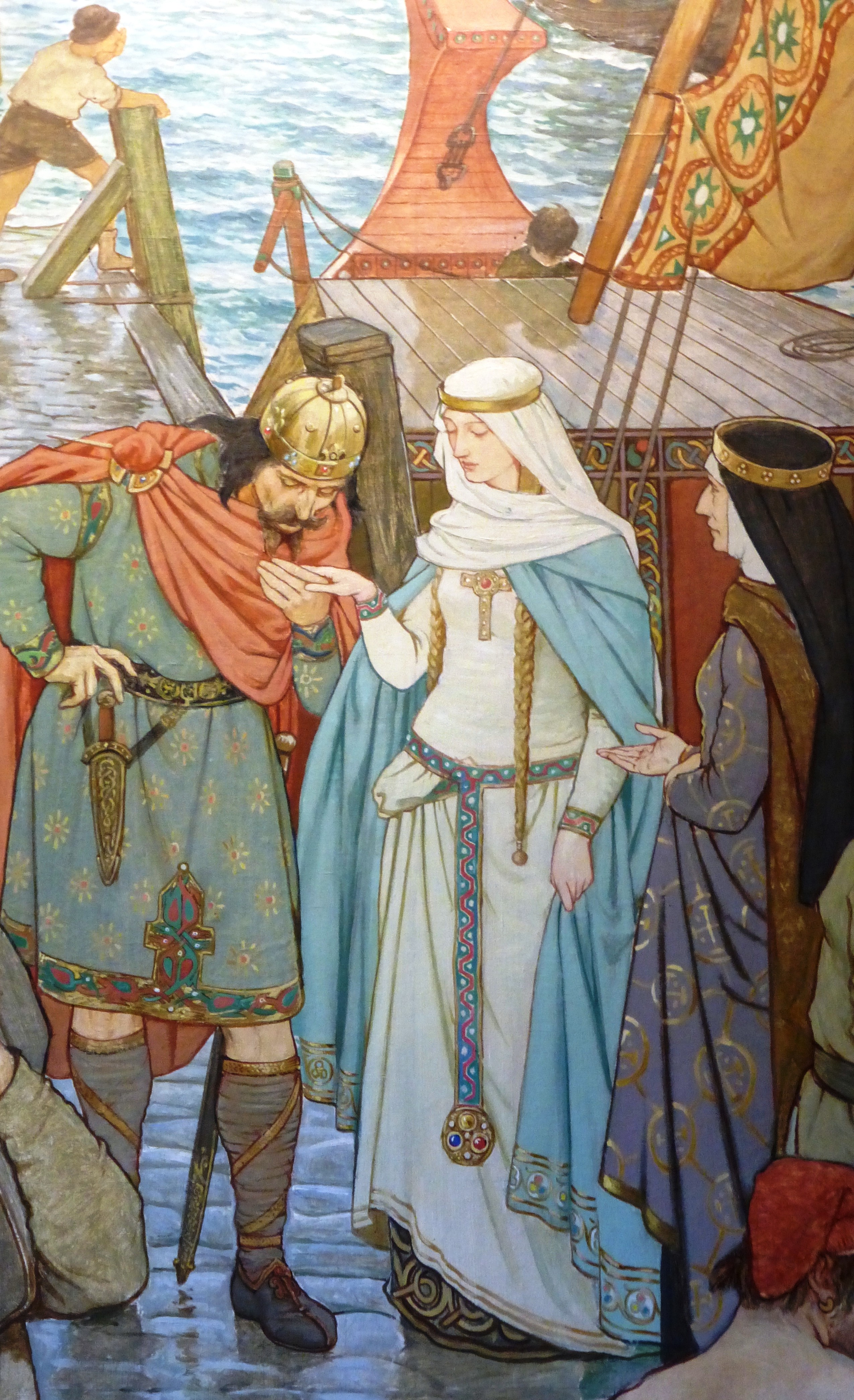
Malcolm III greeting St Margaret upon her arrival in Scotland; detail of a mural by Victorian era artist William Hole

During the reign of King Malcolm III, the Scottish church underwent a series of reforms and transformations. Through the influence of his Hungarian-born wife, St Margaret of Scotland, a clearly defined hierarchy of diocesan bishops and parochial structure for local churches, in line with the queen's experiences in Continental Europe, was developed. Following the 1286 extinction of the Royal House of Dunkeld and the subsequent invasion of Scotland by Edward Longshanks, the political purge of Scottish clergy from the hierarchy, religious orders, and parishes, and their replacement by English clergy was one of the root causes of the Scottish Wars of Independence and is part of why so many of the Scottish clergy defied the pro-English policy of Pope John XXII and signed the Declaration of Arbroath. Following the Battle of Bannockburn, large numbers of new foundations, which introduced Continental European forms of reformed monasticism, began to predominate as the Scottish church re-established its independence from England and developed a clearer diocesan structure, becoming a "special daughter of the see of Rome" but lacking leadership in the form of archbishops. During the Late Middle Ages, similar to in other European countries, the Investiture Controversy and the Great Schism of the West allowed the Scottish Crown, like Scottish clan chiefs using the erenagh system during the time of the Celtic Church, to gain greater influence over senior appointments to the hierarchy and two archbishoprics had accordingly been established by the end of the fifteenth century. While some historians have discerned a decline of monasticism in the Late Middle Ages, the mendicant orders of friars grew, particularly in the expanding burghs, to meet the spiritual needs of the population. New saints and cults of religious devotion also proliferated. Despite problems over the number and quality of clergy after the Black Death in the fourteenth century, and the efforts of Hussite emissary Pavel Kravař to spread doctrines considered heresy; the Renaissance in Scotland also saw wider availability of books, including the Classics and newer works of early modern Scottish literature, due to Androw Myllar and Walter Chepman's introduction of the Gutenberg Revolution to Scotland in 1507. The printing press also helped spread the "New Learning" known as Renaissance humanism, which was also embraced and spread by many Catholic clergy.

The tradition of Crown-appointed "lay abbots" was reintroduced during the reign of James III of Scotland, with similar results to the time of the Celtic Church. King James V even appointed five of his illegitimate sons, with the assent of the Holy See, to the wealthiest abbacies in the Kingdom. According to George Scott-Moncrieff, "Such men were naturally opposed to administrative reform and as naturally enthusiastic for a revolution that would make them absolute possessors of property to which otherwise they would only claim the life-rent..." For this and similar reasons, many Scottish Catholic priests and monks who were also Renaissance humanists, such as Archbishop Andrew Forman, Quintin Kennedy, and Ninian Winzet, "felt bitterly the failure of their fellow clergy to live the life they proclaimed", and called for an internal restoration of Christian morality, that would later be dubbed the Counter-Reformation. Similar critiques and calls also appear in the Middle Scots poetry of Makars William Dunbar and Robert Henryson. Therefore, the Church in Scotland remained relatively strong and stable until the Scottish Reformation in the sixteenth century.

=== Scottish Reformation ===
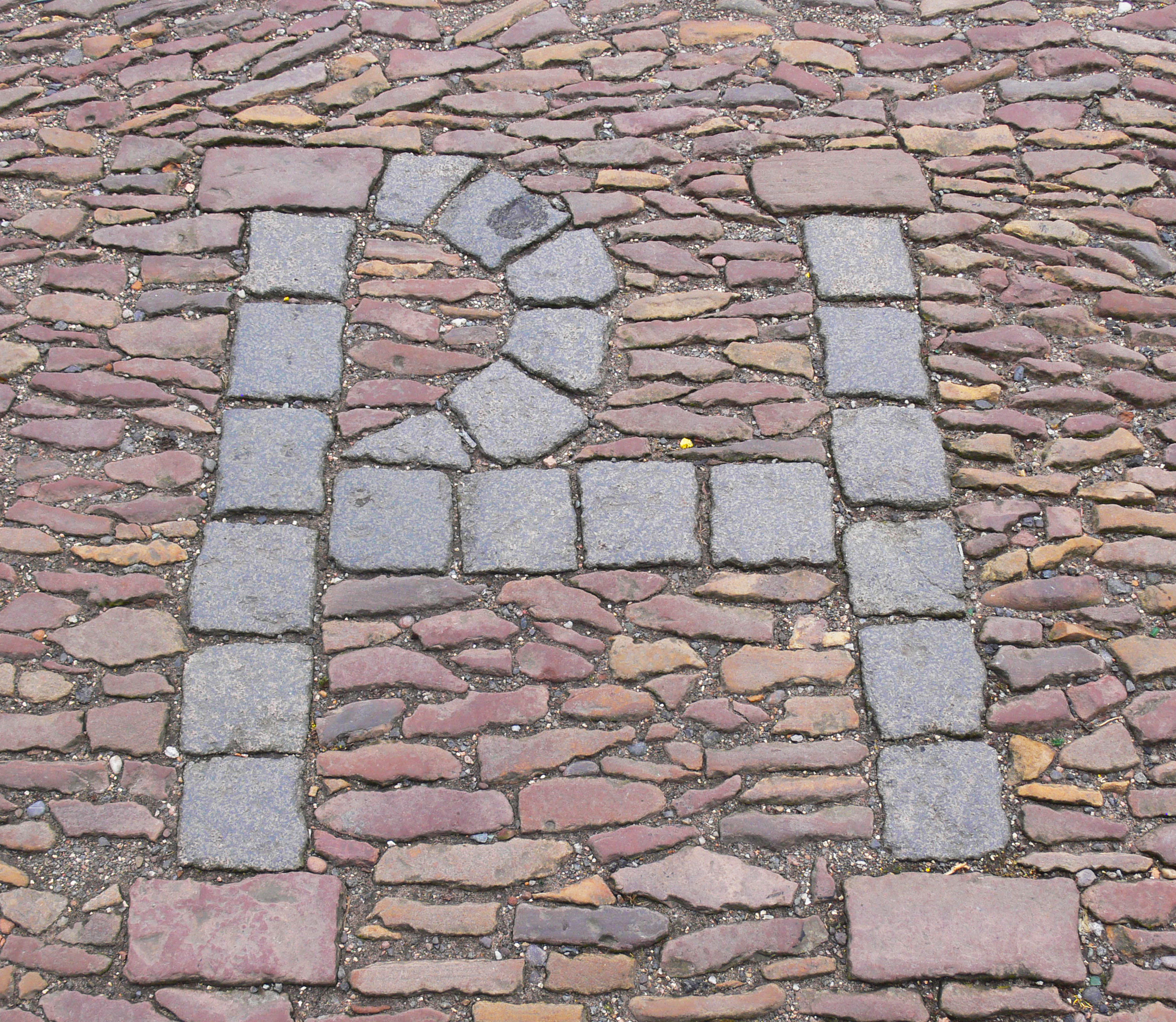
Lutheran pastor Patrick Hamilton's initials, set into the paving stones at the site where he was burned at the stake.

Scotland remained a Catholic country until the arrival of Protestant theology in books smuggled from abroad, beginning in the early 16th century. As often happens in cases of religious persecution of any kind, efforts by the Hierarchy of the Church to enforce the traditional principle of Canon law that "error has no rights" and treat Protestantism as a criminal offense triggered a widespread public backlash. Particularly due to the greater availability and affordability of paper and books, the trials and executions of Protestant martyrs were widely publicized by the printing press and helped spread Protestantism even further. In particular, after he was sentenced to death for his belief in Lutheranism following an Ecclesiastical trial presided over by Archbishop James Beaton and burned at the stake at St. Andrews in 1528, it was said that the "reek [that is, smoke] of Master Patrick Hamilton infected as many as it blew upon". Other similar cases had very similar results.

Despite also facing considerable popular opposition, the Scottish Reformation was effectively completed when the Scottish Parliament broke with the papacy and established a Calvinist confession by law in 1560. At that point, the offering or attending of the Mass was outlawed. The subsequent suppression of monasteries, ban on religious orders, and, most particular, the iconoclasm and book burnings at monastic libraries that often accompanied them has recently been criticised, even by non-Catholic historians, as the destruction of Scotland's cultural inheritance.

Although illegal under the Papal Jurisdiction Act 1560 and other similar legislation, Scotland did not become "a theocratic state on the model of Calvin's Geneva", and an underground Catholic Church continued to survive and command the loyalty of at least half the population in Scotland. According to historian George Scott-Moncrieff, "The collapse of the secular clergy, many of whom renounced their vows and married, while three bishops apostatised and the rest retired in confusion, left only a few who travelled through the country disguised as laymen trying to succour whom they could."

In 1565, for example, John Knox relates that for one hour and four hours on two separate days underground priest Sir James Tarbet was tied to the Mercat Cross, Edinburgh and pelted with eggs after being caught saying the Tridentine Mass, which had been criminalised five years previously.

James VI and his heirs, however, had intended for the Church of Scotland ("The Kirk") to embrace the Elizabethan religious settlement, High Church Anglicanism, Royal Supremacy, and episcopal polity. This led to long-term internal battles between Episcopalian and Presbyterian factions over control of the Kirk, the religious persecution of whichever faction had fallen from power, and the ultimate formation of a separate Scottish Episcopal Church. Persecution of Catholics, however, continued under both Episcopalian and Presbyterian governance.

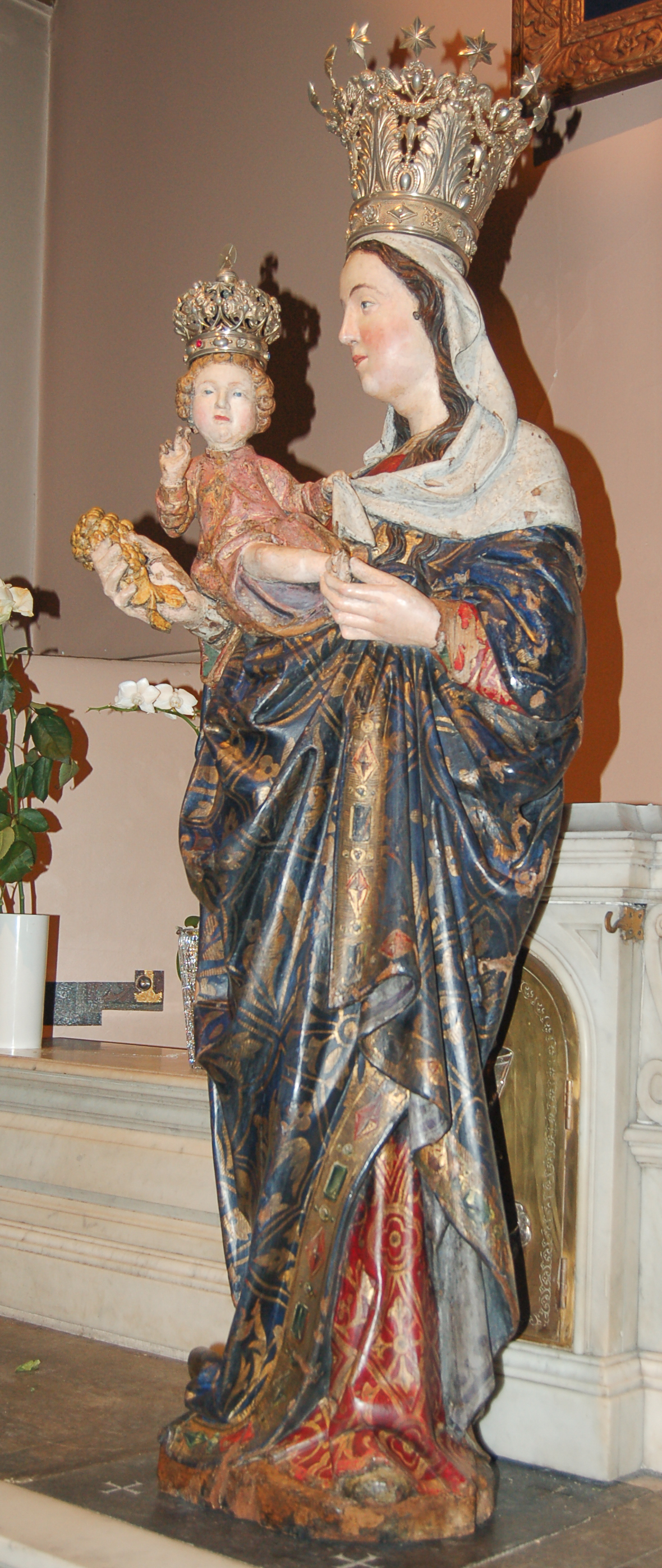
Original 14th-century statue of Our Lady of Aberdeen in Notre Dame de Finistere Church, Brussels, which was hidden by the Marquess of Huntley in Huntly Castle and eventually smuggled to the Spanish Netherlands for protection from desecration following the Scottish Reformation.

Even so, the remaining domestic clergy played a relatively small role and the initiative was often left to lay leaders. Wherever noble families, local lairds, or Scottish clan chiefs illegally offered religious toleration Catholicism continued to thrive covertly, as under Clan Donald in Lochaber, Eigg, and South Uist, under Clan MacNeil in Barra, under the Chisholms and Frasers of Strathglass, or in the north-east under Clan Gordon. In these areas Catholic sacraments were administered by disguised and outlawed priests, but with relative openness. Members of the nobility, who were often closely related, are believed to have been reluctant to pursue each other over matters of religious dissent. An English report in 1600 also alleged that a third of nobles and gentry were still Catholic in inclination.

For example, in his efforts to enforce the King's religious settlement as Bishop of the Isles John Leslie sometimes ran into opposition from the local Scottish nobility (Scottish Gaelic: flath). This was particularly true during the Bishop's efforts to shut down the illegal and underground pastoral work in his Diocese by Franciscan missionaries dispatched from the similarly underground Catholic Church in Ireland during the 1620s and '30s.

Upon 9 September 1630, Fr. Patrick Hegarty, OFM, was arrested upon South Uist by a posse of priest hunters commanded in person by Bishop Leslie, but before the Bishop could deliver Fr. Hegarty for trial, however, Raghnall Mac Ailein 'ic Iain (Ranald MacDonald of Benbecula), the uncle of the then Chief of Clan MacDonald of Clanranald and great-great-grandfather to Scottish Gaelic national poet Alasdair Mac Mhaighstir Alasdair, intervened and relieved the Bishop and his posse of their captive. The incident infuriated King Charles I, who sent a furious letter about it to Privy Council of Scotland on 10 December 1630 and was followed by unsuccessful efforts to summon the Highland nobleman to Inverary for criminal prosecution.

In most of Scotland, Catholicism became an underground faith in private households and secret parish communities, connected by ties of kinship. This reliance on the household meant that Scottish laywomen often became vitally important as the upholders and transmitters of the faith, such as in the case of Lady Fernihurst in the Borders. They transformed their households into centres of religious activity and created safe houses and secret chapels for priests.

After the reformed kirk took over the existing structures and assets of the Church, the 1567 overthrow of Mary, Queen of Scots, and the defeat of the armies seeking her restoration during the 1570s, the Vatican reclassified Scotland as a missionary territory and therefore subject to the Congregation for the Propaganda of the Faith. The leading religious orders of the Counter-Reformation, the Dominicans and the newly founded Jesuits, initially took relatively little interest in Scotland as a target of missionary work and their effectiveness was at first severely damaged by Vatican bureaucracy and, especially by territorial rivalries against each other, secular priests, and other religious orders. The initiative was taken by a small group of Scots connected with the Crichton family, who had supplied the bishops of Dunkeld. They joined the Jesuit order and returned to attempt conversions. Their focus at first was mainly on evangelising the nobility and courtiers, which led them into involvement in seeking to end the religious persecution of the Church through a series of complex regime change plots and political entanglements, which were covertly opposed from London by Lord Burghley and Sir Francis Walsingham. The majority of surviving Scottish laity, however, were long ignored.

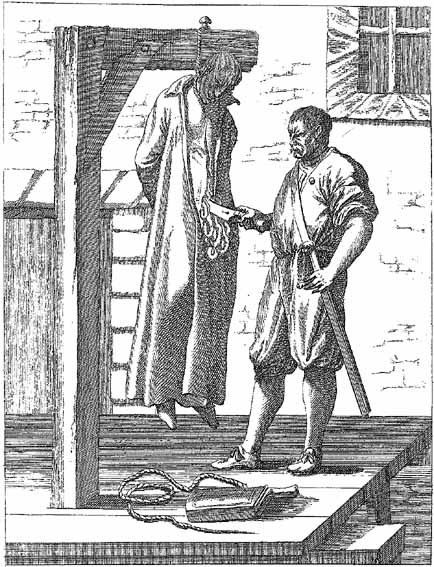
The hanging of Saint John Ogilvie at Glasgow Cross, 10 March 1615.

Some, including members of the Scottish nobility, converted openly to the Catholic Church despite the risks involved. For example, Banffshire aristocrat John Ogilvie (1580–1615) went on to be ordained a priest of the Society of Jesus in 1610. He was arrested by the Anglo-Catholic Archbishop of St. Andrews, John Spottiswoode and, in a deeply ironic parallel to the religious persecution of the Presbyterian Covenanters during the later events known as The Killing Time, Ogilvie was hanged for refusing to take the Oath of Supremacy and declare that the King was Supreme Head of the Church at Glasgow Cross on 10 March 1615. A further reason, according to Thomas Wynne, was that Archbishop Spottiswoode, like many other adherents of Laudianism at the time, had allegedly been accused of Crypto-Catholicism by his enemies in both the Church of Scotland and at Court and chose to use Ogilvie's trial and execution to prove the falseness of the accusations. Ogilvie, who was canonised by Pope Paul VI on 17 October 1976, is often assumed to be the only Scottish Catholic martyr of the Reformation era. Nevertheless, the longevity of the Catholic Church's illegal status had a devastating impact on the numbers of the laity. Even so, a significantly large Catholic population, served by outlawed "heather priests", continued to exist. This was especially the case in the Doric-speaking Northeast and the more remote Gàidhealtachd areas of the Hebrides, the Northwest Highlands, and in Galloway.

=== Decline from the 17th century ===
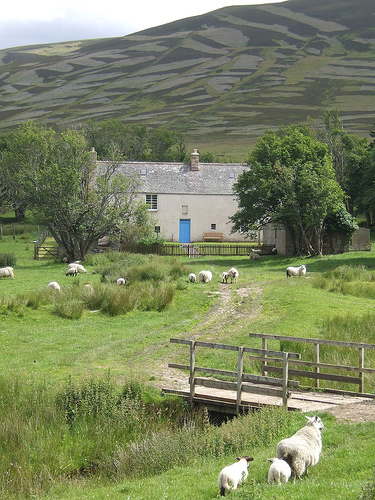
The college at Scalan in July 2007

Numbers probably reduced in the seventeenth century and organisation deteriorated.

The Pope appointed Thomas Nicolson as the first Vicar Apostolic over the mission in 1694. The country was organised into districts and by 1703 there were thirty-three Catholic clergy. In 1733 it was divided into two vicariates, one for the Highland and one for the Lowland, each under a bishop. In the Highland District, which had largely been looked after by Ulster Irish-speaking missionary priests, a minor seminary was founded by Bishop James Gordon to train native-born priests at Eilean Bàn in Loch Morar. It was moved in 1716 to Scalan in Glenlivet, which became the primary centre of underground education for Catholic priests in the area. It was illegal, and it was burned to the ground on several occasions by soldiers sent from beyond the Highlands. Beyond Scalan there were six attempts to found a seminary in the Highlands between 1732 and 1838, all suffering both financially and due to Catholicism's illegal status. Clergy entered the country secretly and although services were illegal they were maintained.

According to a later report by Bishop John Geddes, as outlawed clergymen of an illegal and underground church denomination, it is understandable why Bishop Hugh MacDonald, the Vicar General of the Highlands between 1731 and 1773, and the priests of his district would have felt very hopeful about Jacobitism, due the House of Stuart's promises of Catholic Emancipation, freedom of religion, and civil rights to everyone who worshipped outside the Established Churches of the realm. It is equally understandable why the Scottish Catholic laity, who, "were discouraged and much exposed to oppression", would similarly, "wish for an event that was likely to release them, and put them again into the possession of the privileges of free-born citizens."

Even though many Presbyterians and Episcopalians also fought as Jacobites, aftermath of the Jacobite rising of 1745 further increased the persecution faced by Catholics in Scotland.

The repression was particularly intense during (Scottish Gaelic: Bliadhna nan Creach lit. "the year of the pillaging") that followed the defeat of the Jacobite Army at the Battle of Culloden.

According to Bishop John Geddes, "Immediately after the Battle of Culloden, orders were issued for the demolishing all the Catholic chapels and for apprehending the priests." Historian John Watts confirms that this policy was followed by government troops and that, "In doing so, they appear to have been acting on official orders." "Heather priest" Fr Alexander Cameron's biographer Thomas Wynne alleges that these official orders actually preceded Culloden, "A proclamation was on 6th December 1745, putting into operation certain laws which were more or less obsolete - the Act of Queen Elizabeth, cap. 27, and of James VI, cap. 3, against Jesuits and Catholic priests. A reward of £100 was offered every such person, after conviction, within London, Westminster, Southwark, and within ten miles of these places."

The Hanoverian atrocities that followed were motivated by what American Civil War historian Thomas Lowry has termed "the European tradition … that to victors belong the spoils - the losers could expect pillage and plunder", and that enemy civilians are "grist for the mills of more hardheaded conquerors such as Genghis Khan, Tamerlane, and Ivan the Terrible."

Also according to Bishop John Geddes, "Early in the spring of 1746, some ships of war came to the coast of the isle of Barra and landed some men, who threatened they would lay desolate the whole island if the priest was not delivered up to them. Father James Grant, who was missionary then, and afterward Bishop, being informed of the threats in a safe retreat in which he was in a little island, surrendered himself, and was carried prisoner to Mingarry Castle on the Western coast (i.e. Ardnamurchan) where he was detained for some weeks."

After long and cruel imprisonment with other Catholic priests at Inverness Gaol and in a prison hulk anchored in the River Thames, Grant was deported to the Netherlands and warned never to return to the British Isles. Like the other priests deported with him, Fr. Grant returned to Scotland almost immediately. His fellow prisoner, Father Alexander Cameron, an outlawed "heather priest" to Clan Fraser of Lovat and Clan Chisholm, former military chaplain, and the younger brother to Donald Cameron of Lochiel, the Chief of Clan Cameron, was less fortunate. Fr. Cameron died aboard the prison hulk due to the hardship of his imprisonment on 19 October 1746. During the 21st century, the Knights of St. Columba at the University of Glasgow launched a campaign to canonize Fr. Cameron, "with the hope that he will become a great saint for Scotland and that our nation will merit from his intercession." They erected a small petition book at their altar of St. Joseph in the University Catholic Chapel, Turnbull Hall. It is one of the necessary prerequisites for Canonisation in the Catholic Church that there is a cult of devotion to the saint.

According to historian Daniel Szechi, however, the government's post-Culloden backlash focused upon the Catholic clergy and laity of the Highland District, while leaving the much larger and better organized Lowland District reasonably unscathed.

According to Marcus Tanner, "As the Reformed Church faltered in the urban and increasingly industrialised Lowlands, Presbyterianism made its great breakthrough among the Gaelic Highlanders, virtually snapping cultural bonds that had linked them to Ireland since the lordship of Dalriada. The Highlands, outside tiny Catholic enclaves like in South Uist and Barra, took on the contours they have since preserved - a region marked by a strong tradition of sabbatarianism and a puritanical distaste for instrumental music and dancing, which have only recently regained popular acceptance".

The pioneering Victorian era folklorist and Celticist John Francis Campbell of Islay (Scottish Gaelic: Iain Òg Ìle) and his many assistant collectors had very different reasons for criticising what they saw as the unnecessary excesses of the Calvinisation of the Highlands and Islands. At the beginning of his groundbreaking collection Popular Tales of the West Highlands, Campbell and his helpers complained at length that, due to the fear of displeasing the local ministers, elders, and parish school-masters, it had become almost impossible to collect Scottish mythology or folklore from the seanchaidhs in Gaelic-speaking regions that had recently converted to Presbyterianism from Catholicism or the Scottish Episcopal Church.

Exact numbers of communicants are uncertain, given the illegal status of Catholicism. In 1755 it was estimated that there were some 16,500 communicants, mainly in the north and west. In 1764, "the total Catholic population in Scotland would have been about 33,000 or 2.6% of the total population. Of these 23,000 were in the Highlands." Another estimate for 1764 is of 13,166 Catholics in the Highlands, perhaps a quarter of whom had emigrated by 1790, and another source estimates Catholics as perhaps 10% of the population.

Even though he acknowledges the vitally important role determination to keep the landowning gentry from appointing and removing Church of Scotland ministers during the Highland and Lowland Clearances played in causing the Disruption of 1843, Marcus Tanner also writes, "the Disruption and the Free Church have come in for harsh criticism especially from the political left in recent years. Apart from inflicting a peculiarly censorious and dour version of Christianity on the population, they are charged with imbuing them with ultra-Calvinist pessimism and political passivity, and with encouraging them to dwell on trivial points of doctrine while their communities were being laid waste by the landlords. There is something in the charge. Few Highland ministers emulated the Catholic clergy of Ireland, who commandeered the Repeal movement in the 1830s and 1840s and the land campaigns several decades on. The Catholic clergy in agitated Irish counties like Tipperary led the agrarian militants from the front, which cannot be said for most Disruption clergy or their successors. Evangelical Presbyterianism counseled submission and acceptance of misfortune. But it was a faith chosen quite voluntarily by the people and if it failed to make them rebels against injustice, it certainly lent them dignity."

=== Impact of the Clearances ===
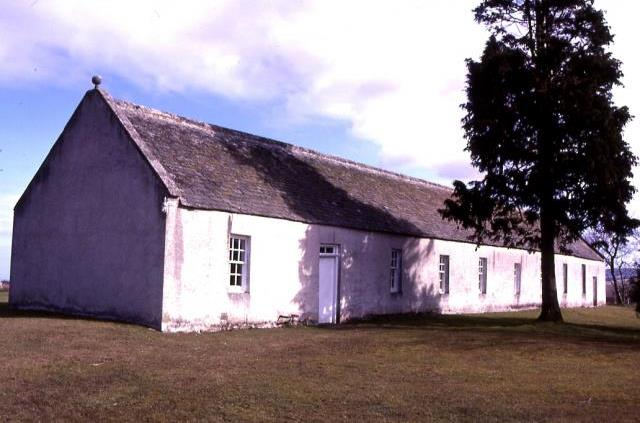
St. Ninian's Church from 1755 is a Catholic clandestine church located at the Enzie

While most of the landlords responsible for the Highland Clearances did not target people for ethnic or religious reasons, there is evidence of anti-Catholicism among some of them. In particular, large numbers of Catholics emigrated from the Western Highlands in the period 1770 to 1810 and there is evidence that anti Catholic sentiment (along with famine, poverty, and rackrenting) was a contributory factor in that period.

In an April 1787 letter from Moidart to the Congregation for Propaganda in Rome, Fr. Austin MacDonald wrote, "On account of the emigration of the people of Knoydart to Canada, along with their priest; it fell to me in the autumn to attend to those who were left behind, and during the winter to the people of Moydart (sic) as well. Although not less than 600 Catholics went to America, still I administered the Sacraments to over 500 souls who remained. The overpopulation of these districts, together with the oppression of the landlords, are the principal causes of the departure of so many, not only among the Catholics, but also among the Protestants."

In Glengarry County, Upper Canada, a Canadian Gaelic-speaking pioneer settlement was established for Scottish Catholics through the efforts of British Army military chaplain and future Catholic bishop Alexander Macdonnell. The settlement's inhabitants consisted of members of the Glengarry Fencibles, a disbanded Catholic unit of the Highland Fencible Corps, and their families.

In addition to Bishop MacDonnell, there were many other "heather priests", such as William Fraser, Angus Bernard MacEachern, and Ranald Rankin, the composer of the famous Gaelic Christmas carol Tàladh Chrìosda, who similarly followed their evicted and voluntary émigré parishioners into the Scottish diaspora during the Clearances.

In 1879, a visitor from Scotland enthusiastically declared that the Glengarry dialect of Scottish Gaelic was better preserved, "with the most perfect accent, and with scarcely any, if any, admixture of English", in Glengarry County and in Cornwall, Ontario than in Lochaber itself. For very similar reasons, Odo Blundell commented ruefully in 1909 that the language, customs, and oral tradition of once densely populated and overwhelmingly Catholic Strathglass were better preserved in Nova Scotia than in Scotland.

After receiving his post following the 1878 Restoration of the Hierarchy and during the last decade of the Clearances, Bishop Angus MacDonald of the Diocese of Argyll and the Isles led by example during the height of the Highland Land League agitation. The Bishop and his priests became leading and formidable activists for tenant's rights, reasonable rents, security of tenure, free elections, and against the political bossism, excessive rents, and religious discrimination that were keeping a majority of the Catholic and Protestant population of the Highlands and Islands critically impoverished.

According to Roger Hutchinson, the hostility of Bishop MacDonald and his priests to the absolute power granted to the landlords under Scots property law at the time, which Hutchinson inaccurately labels as Liberation Theology rather than Distributism, was fueled by a deep sense of outrage over the decimation of the Catholic population of the Scottish Gaeldom by the Highland Clearances. A further influence was the knowledge that the roots of the Clearances lay in the Classical Liberalism preached in Adam Smith's The Wealth of Nations during the Scottish Enlightenment and in that ideology's hostility to, "bigotry and superstition"; which were, in 18th- and 19th-century Scotland, routinely used as shorthand for Roman Catholicism.

Roger Hutchinson further writes that Bishop MacDonald's choice to assign Gaelic-speaking priests from the Scottish mainland to parishes in the Hebrides was accordingly no accident. About that time, when the Bishop and his priests were the leaders of direct action, rent strikes, and other acts of resistance to the Anglo-Scottish landlords, Fr. Michael MacDonald has since commented, "I think that one of the things that may have influenced the boldness of the priests at that time was simply that they had no relations on the islands who could have been got at by the estate Factor or others."

=== Large-scale Catholic immigration ===
During the 19th century, Irish immigration substantially increased the number of Catholics in the country, especially in Glasgow and its vicinity, and other industrial communities in the Lowlands of Scotland, but also in many rural communities, where Irish migrants worked as navvies and farm labourers (see Potato Labour Scandal 1971).

Initially, clergymen from the recusant districts of North-East Scotland played an important part in providing support.

In Dumbarton, which in 1820 only had two or three Catholic families, the population was increased by Irish and Highland migration until the first parish church, dedicated to St Patrick, was built in 1830. According to local historian I.M.M. MacPhail, "Before 1830, a few Catholics used to meet in the ruins of the old pre-Reformation parish church of Cardross in the Levengrove policies and later, just before their church was built, the Rev. John Gordon of Greenock held services in an old store in College Street. In 1837, it was estimated that there were 284 Catholics in Dumbarton".

The same community saw regular outbreaks of violence in the pubs on the paydays of local Irish navvies and the first of many serious anti-Irish riots that negatively affected Dumbarton's reputation after Protestant shipwrights listened to a sermon by visiting anti-Catholic preacher and polemicist John Sayers Orr in October 1855. A very similar riot had previously been incited by Orr, whom Tim Pat Coogan has compared to the Rev. Ian Paisley, in Greenock on 12 July 1851. When Orr was thrown into prison, his followers also rioted. Attempts were also made to convert Irish migrants to Presbyterianism by recruiting missionaries like Rev. Patrick MacMenemy, a native speaker of Ulster Irish from the Glens of Antrim, but whose ministerial reputation collapsed following allegations of womanizing in 1885.

The Catholic hierarchy was re-established in 1878 by Pope Leo XIII and six new dioceses were created: five of them were organised into a single province with the Archbishop of St Andrews and Edinburgh as metropolitan; the Diocese of Glasgow remained separate and directly subject to the Apostolic See.

As the Catholic presence in the Lowlands increased and revived, however, there were regular cases of conflict between Highland migrants and Irish immigrants over both cultural differences and control of Catholic parishes, schools, and neighbourhoods. Irish Catholics often complained to the Holy See, particularly after the restoration of the Scottish Hierarchy in the 1878, that Irish priests were only used to organize parishes and schools and then immediately replaced by the bishops with Doric-speaking pastors from Banffshire and other recusant districts in the Northeast of Scotland. Even though this was intended to assimilate Highland and Irish Catholics into Lowland Scottish culture as quickly as possible, the Hierarchy's success in this policy ultimately proved mixed. The urban centers of the Lowlands continue to have branches of Conradh na Gaeilge and remain centers of the Irish language outside Ireland. Also, since the recent Scottish Gaelic Renaissance and increasing spread of language immersion schools, for new and emerging dialects like Glasgow Gaelic. Furthermore, in 1928 the Legion of Mary, a Marian movement recently organized for voluntary service by Frank Duff in Dublin, established its first foreign praesidium (branch) in Scotland.

In the wake of Irish Catholic migration to Scotland, native Scottish Catholics, such as the recusants, supported efforts in education to "denationalise" the Irish, while Scottish-born Catholic clergy also engaged in efforts to suppress Irish radicalism. Other native Scots, such as converts and the Scottish ultramontanes worked to foster a "more prosperous, productive and respectable British Catholic Body."

Later Italian, Polish, and Lithuanian immigrants further reinforced the numbers. The post-World War II arrival of large numbers of Ukrainian displaced persons resulted in the first Scottish parish of the Eastern Catholic Churches being founded in 1965: St Andrew's Ukrainian Catholic Church in Leith, Edinburgh.

=== Sectarian tensions ===
Mass immigration to Scotland saw the emergence of sectarian tensions. Although the interwar Catholic community in Scotland was overwhelmingly working-class and endangered by poverty and economic crises, it was able to cope with the Great Depression. This relative immunity was caused by the Education (Scotland) Act 1918, which made Catholic schools fully state-funded. Michael John Rosie argues that in addition to state-funded education, it was the nature of Scottish Catholicism that "made it less vulnerable to economic dislocation":

Arguably, the Catholic Church was the best-equipped denomination in tackling the adverse effects of economic depression, and does not seem to have suffered serious losses arising from recessionary periods. The Catholic faith is often seen as being invigorated by the combined effects of poverty and discrimination; priests tended to be drawn from the working classes and to relate well to economic hardship amongst their parishioners. Though Catholics moved increasingly during this period into skilled and white-collar jobs, the Catholic community retained a homogeneity which prevented a major social divide emerging between a practising Catholic bourgeoisie and a lapsed proletariat.

— Michael John Rosie, Religion and Sectarianism in Modern Scotland, (2001), pp. 142

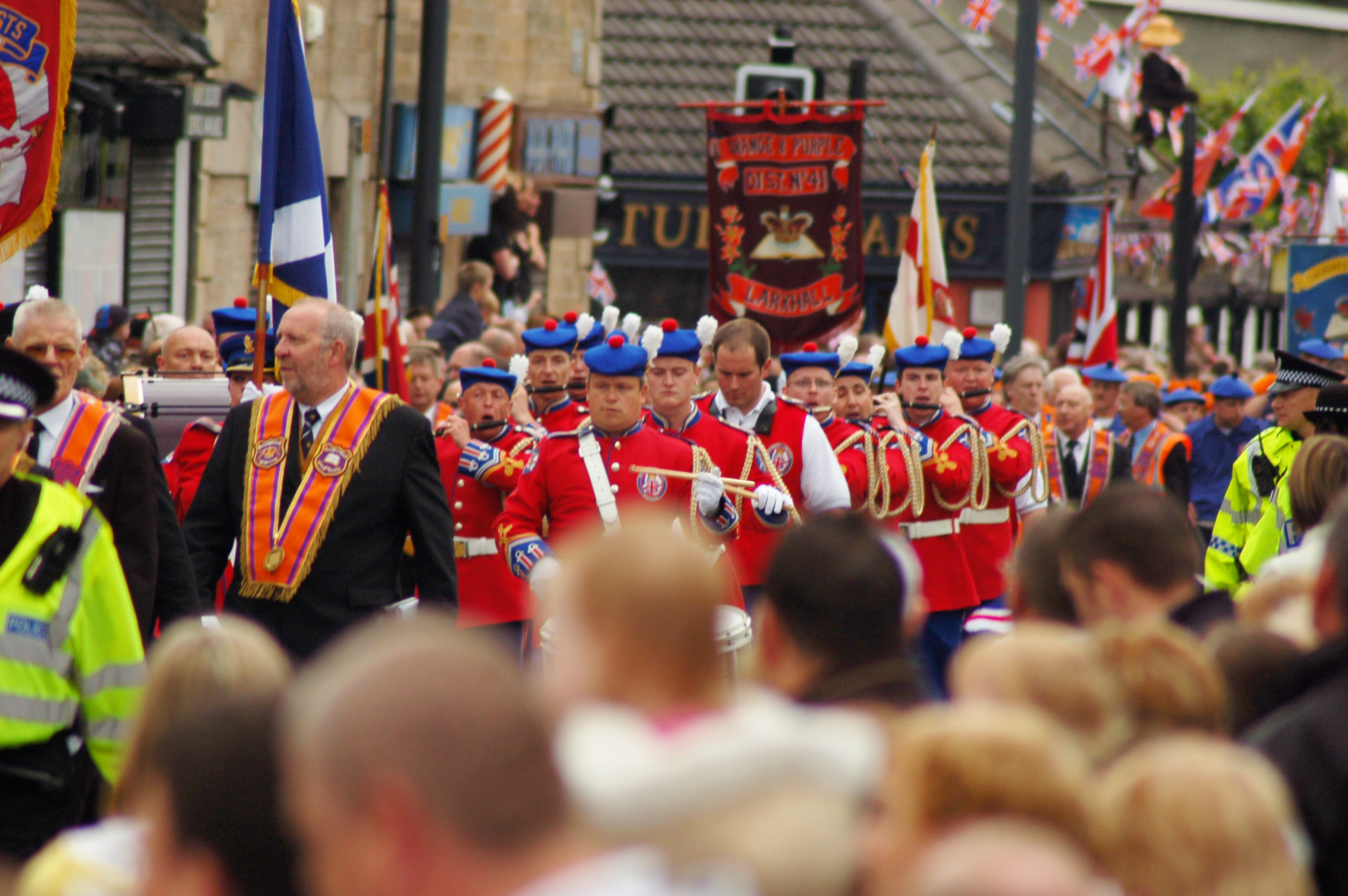
Orangemen parading in Larkhall, Scotland (12 of July 2008)

This relative economic stability allowed the Catholic community to enter the political and social life of Scotland, sparking outrage among anti-Catholic and unionist circles, most notably the Orange Order's Grand Lodge. Sectarian violence in Scotland reached its peak in the late 1920s and early 1930s, and Catholic religious processions were frequently attacked by anti-Catholic and Orange mobs. The Orange Order also frequently and deliberately staged provocative marches through Catholic neighbourhoods.

The escalating violence and skirmishes, particularly between pro- and anti-Catholic Glasgow razor gangs, had a profound effect on Scotland as a whole; Rosie remarked that "the level and scale of the violence exhibited between 1931 and 1935 of a much more serious and concerted nature than of any period since the reintroduction of Orange parades in the 1870s". Sectarian violence was so severe that it caused higher policing costs, and local councils were tempted to ban all "religious and pseudo-religious processions" outright. While eventually no such ban took place, tightening restrictions were introduced in order to minimise anti-Catholic violence.

In 1923, the Church of Scotland produced a (since repudiated) report, entitled The Menace of the Irish Race to our Scottish Nationality, accusing the largely immigrant Catholic population of subverting Presbyterian values and of spreading drunkenness, crime, and financial imprudence. Rev. John White, a senior member of the General Assembly of the Church of Scotland at the time, called for a "racially pure" Scotland, declaring "Today there is a movement throughout the world towards the rejection of non-native constituents and the crystallization of national life from native elements."

Such officially hostile attitudes started to wane considerably from the 1930s and 1940s onwards, especially as the leadership of the Church of Scotland learned of what was happening in eugenics-conscious Nazi Germany and of what the dangers of creating a "racially pure" national church looked like in actual practice; particularly, after German people who were of even partially Slavic, Roma, or Jewish ancestry or who were adherents of the traditionalist Protestant Confessing Church ceased being considered "true" members of the Volksgemeinschaft.

The era's level of sectarian violence was not to be seen again until the Glasgow pub bombings, a spillover from the Troubles in Northern Ireland, were carried out by the Ulster Volunteer Force against pubs frequented by Catholics on 17 February 1979. The Glasgow-based UVF active service unit responsible for the bombings were arrested, convicted and incarcerated. Experts now believe that only the Provisional Irish Republican Army leadership's veto on bombing operations in Scotland, which were considered counterproductive to many other useful covert operations there, prevented the Troubles from continuing to spill over and further escalating.

=== Social change and communal divisions ===
In 1986, the General Assembly of the Church of Scotland expressly repudiated the sections of the Westminster Confession directly attacking the Catholic Church. In 1990, both the Church of Scotland and the Catholic Church were founding members of the ecumenical bodies Churches Together in Britain and Ireland and Action of Churches Together in Scotland; relations between denominational leaders are now very cordial. Unlike the relationship between the hierarchies of the different churches, however, some communal tensions remain.

The association between football and displays of sectarian behaviour by some fans has been a source of embarrassment and concern to the management of certain clubs. The bitter rivalry between Celtic and Rangers in Glasgow, known as the Old Firm, is known worldwide for its sectarian dimension. Celtic was founded by Irish Catholic immigrants and Rangers has traditionally been supported by Unionists and Protestants. Sectarian tensions can still be very real, though perhaps diminished compared with past decades. Perhaps the greatest psychological breakthrough was when Rangers signed Mo Johnston (a Catholic) in 1989. Celtic, on the other hand, have never had a policy of not signing players due to their religion, and some of the club's greatest figures have been Protestants.

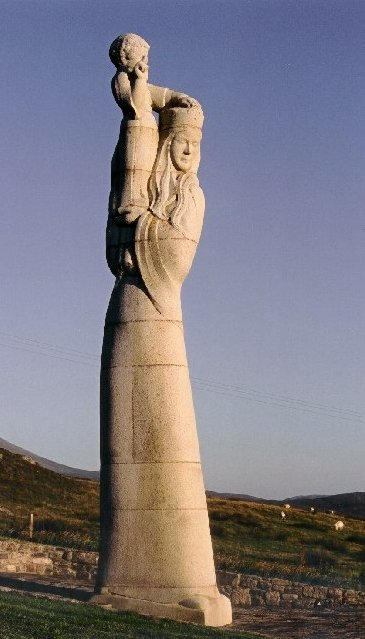
The 1958 statue of Our Lady of the Isles, upon South Uist, in the Outer Hebrides.

From the 1980s the UK government passed several acts that had provisions concerning sectarian violence. These included the Public Order Act 1986, which introduced offences relating to the incitement of racial hatred, and the Crime and Disorder Act 1998, which introduced offences of pursuing a racially aggravated course of conduct that amounts to harassment of a person. The 1998 Act also required courts to take into account where offences are racially motivated, when determining sentence. In the twenty-first century the Scottish Parliament legislated against sectarianism. This included provision for religiously aggravated offences in the Criminal Justice (Scotland) Act 2003. The Criminal Justice and Licensing (Scotland) Act 2010 strengthened statutory aggravations for both racially and religiously motivated hate crimes. The Offensive Behaviour at Football and Threatening Communications (Scotland) Act 2012, criminalised behaviour which is threatening, hateful, or otherwise offensive at a regulated football match including offensive singing or chanting. It also criminalised the communication of threats of serious violence and threats intended to incite religious hatred.

57% of the Catholic community belong to the manual working-class. Though structural disadvantage had largely eroded by the 1980s, Scottish Catholics are more likely to experience poverty and deprivation than their Protestant counterparts. Many more Catholics can now be found in what were called the professions, with some occupying posts in the judiciary or in national politics. In 1999, the Rt Hon John Reid MP became the first Catholic to hold the office of Secretary of State for Scotland. His succession by the Rt Hon Helen Liddell MP in 2001 attracted considerably more media comment that she was the first woman to hold the post than that she was the second Catholic. Also notable was the appointment of Louise Richardson to the University of St. Andrews as its principal and vice-chancellor. St Andrews is the third oldest university in the Anglosphere. Richardson, a Catholic, was born in Ireland and is a naturalised United States citizen. She is the first woman to hold that office and first Catholic to hold it since the Scottish Reformation.

The Catholic Church recognises the separate identities of Scotland and England and Wales. The church in Scotland is governed by its own hierarchy and bishops' conference, not under the control of English bishops. In more recent years, for example, there have been times when it was especially the Scottish bishops who took the floor in the United Kingdom to argue for Catholic social and moral teaching. The presidents of the bishops' conferences of England and Wales, Scotland, and Ireland meet formally to discuss "mutual concerns", though they are separate national entities. "Closer cooperation between the presidents can only help the Church's work", a spokesman noted.

Scottish Catholics strongly supported the Labour Party in the past, and Labour politicians openly courted Catholic voters and accused their opponents such as the Scottish National Party of opposing the existence of Catholic schools. Although ancestrally indigenous Catholics remained deeply committed to the Scottish nation within the British state, the broader population of Scottish Catholics increasingly started identifying with Scottish nationalism in the 1970s and 1980s, and switched to the SNP as their preferred party. Scottish Catholics from Irish backgrounds emerged as a staunchly pro-independence group – according to a 2020 poll, 70% of Scots from Irish Catholic backgrounds supported Scottish independence. In 2013, Scottish sociologist Michael Rosie noted that "Catholics were actually the religious sub-group most likely to support an independent Scotland in 1999. This remains true in 2012." Scottish Catholics are also more likely to be in favour of Scottish independence and to support SNP than non-religious voters.

== Organisation ==
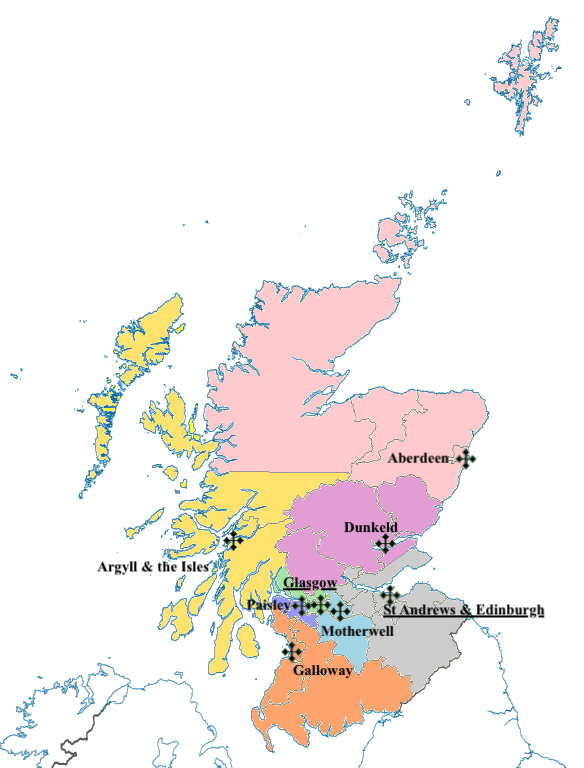
Map of Catholic dioceses in Scotland

There are four entities that encompass Scotland, England, and Wales.

- The Bishopric of the Forces serves all members of the British Armed Forces throughout the world, including those stationed on bases in Scotland.
- The Personal Ordinariate of Our Lady of Walsingham is a jurisdiction equivalent to a diocese for former Anglicans received into full communion with the Catholic Church. It has faculty to celebrate a distinct variant of the Roman Rite based on both the Tridentine Mass and the Sarum Rite, but with a dialect of Elizabethan English, based on the Book of Common Prayer, being used as their liturgical language.
- The Ukrainian Catholic Eparchy of the Holy Family of London serves members of the Ukrainian Catholic Church, a sui juris ritual church of Byzantine Rite that is part of the larger Catholic Church.
- The Syro-Malabar Catholic Eparchy of Great Britain serves members of the Syro-Malabar Church.

There are two Catholic archdioceses and six dioceses in Scotland; 841,000 people stated they were Catholic:

Diocese	Province	Approximate Territory	Cathedral	Creation	Membership
Archdiocese of Saint Andrews and Edinburgh; Archbishop Leo Cushley	Saint Andrews and Edinburgh	Saint Andrews, most of Fife, Kinross-shire, Clackmannanshire, Stirlingshire, West Lothian, Edinburgh, Midlothian, East Lothian, Scottish Borders	Metropolitan Cathedral of Our Lady of the Assumption	1878	123,500 (2022)
Diocese of Aberdeen; Bishop Hugh Gilbert	Saint Andrews and Edinburgh	Aberdeen, Moray, Highland (except southern Inverness-shire, Skye and the islands), The Orkney Islands, The Shetland Islands	Cathedral Church of St Mary of the Assumption	1878	51,000 (2022)
Diocese of Argyll and the Isles; Bishop Brian McGee	Saint Andrews and Edinburgh	Argyll and Bute, southern Inverness-shire, Arran, The Hebrides Islands	Cathedral Church of St Columba	1878	10,000 (2022)
Diocese of Dunkeld; Bishop Andrew McKenzie	Saint Andrews and Edinburgh	Dundee, Forfarshire, Perthshire and northern Fife	Cathedral Church of St Andrew	1878	63,260 (2021)
Diocese of Galloway; Bishop Francis Dougan	Saint Andrews and Edinburgh	Ayrshire (except Arran), Dumfries and Galloway	Cathedral Church of St Margaret	1878	41,350 (2021)
Archdiocese of Glasgow; Archbishop William Nolan	Glasgow	Glasgow and Dunbartonshire	Metropolitan Cathedral Church of St Andrew	1878	218,170 (2021)
Diocese of Motherwell; Bishop Joseph Toal	Glasgow	Lanarkshire	Cathedral Church of Our Lady of Good Aid	1947 (from Archdiocese of Glasgow and Diocese of Galloway)	163,000 (2021)
Diocese of Paisley; Bishop John Keenan	Glasgow	Renfrewshire	Cathedral Church of Saint Mirin	1947 (from Archdiocese of Glasgow)	87,940 (2021)
Eparchy of the Holy Family of London; Bishop Kenneth Nowakowski	Kiev–Galicia	Great Britain	Cathedral Church of the Holy Family in Exile	1968 (elevated to Eparchy 2013)	13,000 (2021)
Bishopric of the Forces; Bishop Paul Mason	Holy See	HM Forces both in Britain and abroad	Cathedral Church of St Michael and St George	1986	
Personal Ordinariate of Our Lady of Walsingham; Bishop David Waller	Holy See	Former Anglican clergy, religious and laity resident in England, Wales and Scotland.	Principal Church of Our Lady of the Assumption and St Gregory	2011	1,950 (2021)
Syro-Malabar Catholic Eparchy of Great Britain; Bishop Joseph Srampickal	Syro-Malabar Catholic Major Archeparchy of Ernakulam–Angamaly	The Syro-Malabar Church in England, Wales and Scotland.	Syro-Malabar Cathedral of St Alphonsa, Preston	2016	41,000 (2021)

The Bishopric of the Forces and the Personal Ordinariate of Our Lady of Walsingham are directly subject to the Holy See. The Ukrainian Catholic Eparchy of the Holy Family of London and the Syro-Malabar Catholic Eparchy of Great Britain was subject to their own metropolitans, major archbishops, and major archiepiscopal synods.

== 21st century ==
Percentage claiming to be Catholic in the 2011 UK Census in Scotland

Between 1982 and 2010, the proportion of Scottish Catholics dropped 18%, baptisms dropped 39%, and Catholic church marriages dropped 63%. The number of priests also dropped. Between the 2001 UK Census and the 2011 UK Census, the proportion of Catholics remained steady while that of other Christian denominations, notably the Church of Scotland, dropped.

In 2001, Catholics were a minority in each of Scotland's 32 council areas but in a few parts of the country their numbers were close to those of the official Church of Scotland. The most Catholic part of the country is composed of the western Central Belt council areas near Glasgow. In Inverclyde, 38.3% of persons responding to the 2001 UK Census reported themselves to be Catholic compared to 40.9% as adherents of the Church of Scotland. North Lanarkshire also already had a large Catholic minority at 36.8% compared to 40.0% in the Church of Scotland. Following in order were West Dunbartonshire (35.8%), Glasgow City (31.7%), Renfrewshire (24.6%), East Dunbartonshire (23.6%), South Lanarkshire (23.6%) and East Renfrewshire (21.7%).

In 2011, Catholics outnumbered adherents of the Church of Scotland in several council areas, including North Lanarkshire, Inverclyde, West Dunbartonshire, and the most populous one: Glasgow City.

Between the two censuses, numbers in Glasgow with no religion rose significantly while those noting their affiliation to the Church of Scotland dropped significantly so that the latter fell below those that identified with an affiliation to the Catholic Church.

At a smaller geographic scale, one finds that the two most Catholic parts of Scotland are: (1) the southernmost islands of the Western Isles, especially Barra and South Uist, populated by Gaelic-speaking Scots of long-standing; and (2) the eastern suburbs of Glasgow, especially around Coatbridge, populated mostly by the descendants of Irish Catholic immigrants.

According to the 2011 UK Census, Catholics comprise 16% of the overall population, making it the second-largest church after the Church of Scotland (32%).

Along ethnic or racial lines, Scottish Catholicism was in the past, and has remained at present, predominantly White or light-skinned in membership, as have always been other branches of Christianity in Scotland. Among respondents in the 2011 UK Census who identified as Catholic, 81% are White Scots, 17% are Other White (mostly other British or Irish), 1% is either Asian, Asian Scottish or Asian British, and an additional 1% is either mixed-race or from multiple ethnicities; African; Caribbean or black; or from other ethnic groups.

In recent years the Catholic Church in Scotland has experienced negative publicity in the mainstream media due to statements made by bishops in defence of traditional Christian morality and in criticism of secular and liberal ideology. Joseph Devine, Bishop of Motherwell, came under fire after alleging that the "gay lobby" were mounting "a giant conspiracy" to completely destroy Christianity. Criticism was also levelled at perceived intransigence on joint faith schools and threats to withdraw acquiescence unless guarantees of separate genders having different staff rooms, toilets, gyms, visitor, and pupil entrances were not met.

In 2003, a Catholic church spokesman branded sex education as "pornography" and now disgraced Cardinal Keith O'Brien claimed plans to teach sex education in pre-schools amounted to "state-sponsored sexual abuse of minors."

There has also been even worse publicity related to the sexual abuse of minors. In 2016, a headteacher and teacher of the St Ninian's Orphanage, Falkland, Fife were sentenced for abuse at the orphanage from 1979 to 1983 when it was run by the Congregation of Christian Brothers. Fr John Farrell the last headteacher there was sentenced to five years imprisonment. Paul Kelly, a teacher, was sentenced to ten years. More than 100 charges involving 35 boys were made regarding the orphanage, which had been closed down in 1983. In 2019, it emerged that the Superior General of the Christian Brothers, approved the placement of Farrell at St Ninian's despite previous reports of interfering with boys at a South African boarding school where it was recommended by the African provincial that Farrell should never be placed in a boarding school in the future.

Roughly half of Catholic parishes in the West of Scotland were closed or merged because of a priest shortage and over half have closed in the Archdiocese of St Andrews and Edinburgh.

In 2013, Scotland's most senior cleric, Cardinal Keith O'Brien, resigned after allegations of sexual misconduct were made against him and partially admitted. Subsequently, allegations were made that several other cases of alleged sexual misconduct took place involving other priests.

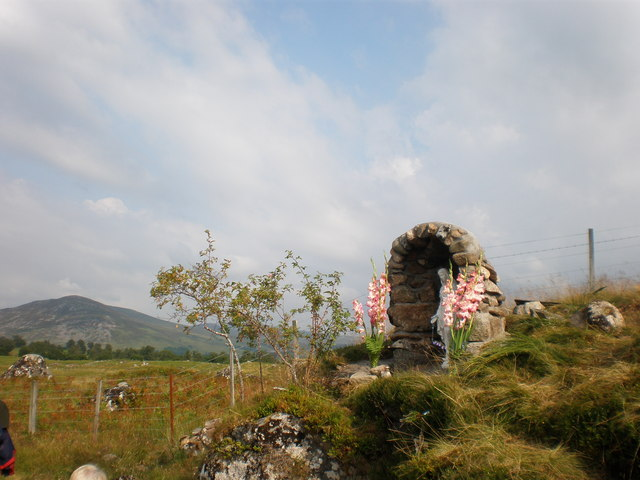
Marian grotto and Christian pilgrimage shrine dedicated to Our Lady of the Highlands on the grounds of Immaculate Conception Church at Stratherrick, near Whitebridge, Inverness-shire.

At the Christian pilgrimage shrine to 'Our Lady of the Highlands', within the grounds of Immaculate Conception Roman Catholic Church near the village of Whitebridge (Scottish Gaelic: An Drochaid Bhàn) and to Loch Ness, a new outdoor Mass stone was consecrated by Bishop Hugh Gilbert of the Roman Catholic Diocese of Aberdeen in March 2017.

In a 2021 article published in The Lamp, University of Glasgow student and essayist Jamie McGowan credited "The Outlander Effect", rooted in the enormous popularity of Diana Gabaldon's series of romance novels and the television adaptation of them, with making Roman Catholicism, not only socially acceptable, but even into a fashionable element of Scottish national identity and cultural nationalism. This is ironic, as the television series' historically inaccurate and allegedly negative depiction of 18th-century Catholic "heather priests" and Protestant ministers had previously drawn accusations of anti-Christianity.

In addition to their efforts to promote Fr. Alexander Cameron for Canonization, the Knights of St Columba's Council No. 1 has also been involved in spreading the Legion of Mary and the St Vincent de Paul Society to fellow Millennial students at the University of Glasgow, and has launched the annual Brecbannoch Pilgrimage; bearing the relics of St Andrew, St Columba, and St Margaret of Scotland, which are on loan from Carfin Grotto, on foot inside a replica of the Brecbannoch of St Columba to Iona Abbey.

2024 Police Scotland data revealed that 33% of all anti-religious hate crimes in Scotland are directed towards Catholics, with Catholics making up just 13% of the population.

In 2020, the Scottish Bishops accused the SNP of "open and vicious hostility" towards Christians within their own ranks, like Lisa Cameron, who dissent from the Party leadership's desired platform on legalized abortion. In 2023, the Scottish Catholic Bishops joined with the Church of Scotland and the Scottish Association of Mosques to express concern about the SNP's recent attacks against the religious beliefs of Kate Forbes, the Party's MSP for Skye, Lochaber, and Badenoch. Forbes, who is a Free Church of Scotland member, was receiving significant attacks for expressing her belief in Christian morality regarding abortion, gay marriage, premarital sex, and other issues. A spokesman for the Scottish bishops said that the attacks against Forbes risked, "permanently damaging the ability of religious believers to enter politics", and further illustrate, "the decline of tolerance for religious views."

In 2025, Lady Elish Angiolini became the first practising Roman Catholic to be appointed Lord High Commissioner to the General Assembly of the Church of Scotland, the British Monarch's representative to the Assembly.

== See also ==
=== General ===
- Catholicism in the Western Isles
- Hierarchy of the Catholic Church
- List of Catholic churches in Scotland
- List of monastic houses in Scotland

=== Catholic letters in Scotland ===
- Aberdeen Breviary
- Innes Review
- Scottish Catholic Observer
- The Geddes Burns
- The World, the Flesh, and Father Smith, a 1944 novel by Bruce Marshall about the life of a Scottish Catholic priest assigned to parish in an urban slum
- Y Gododdin

=== Scottish Catholic Martyrs ===
- John Black (martyr)
- St Blathmac
- St Donnán of Eigg
- George Douglas (martyr)
- William Gibson (martyr)
- John Ingram (martyr)
- St Máel Ruba
- Martyrs of Iona
- Saint John Ogilvie
- Patrick Primrose

=== Pilgrimage shrines ===
- Carfin Grotto
- Clachan Comar, Glen Cannich
- Glasgow Cross
- Iona Abbey
- Immaculate Conception Parish Church, Stratherrick
- Isle Maree
