= List of acts of the Parliament of Scotland from 1560 =

This is a list of acts of the Parliament of Scotland for the year 1560.

It lists acts of Parliament of the old Parliament of Scotland, that was merged with the old Parliament of England to form the Parliament of Great Britain, by the Union with England Act 1707 (c. 7).

For other years, see list of acts of the Parliament of Scotland. For the period after 1707, see list of acts of the Parliament of Great Britain.

== 1560 ==
Continuing the 8th parliament of Mary.

| Short title, or popular name | Citation | Royal assent |
Long title
| Confession of Faith Ratification Act 1560 still in force | 1560 c. 1 (Note: This is the citation in the Record Edition.) — (Note: This act is not listed in the Duodecimal Edition.) | 24 August 1560 |
The Confessioun of fayth professed and beleued be the protestantis within the Realme of scotland publischeit be thame in parliament and be the estaitis thairof ratifeit and apprevit as hailsome and sound doctrine groundit vpoune the infallibill trewth of godis word. The Confession of Faith professed and believed by the protestants within the realm of Scotland, published by them in parliament, and by the estates thereof ratified and approved as wholesome and sound doctrine, ground upon the infallible truth of God's word.
| Papal Jurisdiction Act 1560 still in force | 1560 c. 2 — | 24 August 1560 |
Concerning the jurisdictioun and autoritie of the bischope of Rome callit the Paip. Concerning the jurisdiction and authority of the bishop of Rome called the Pope.
| Abolition of Idolatry Act 1560 (repealed) | 1560 c. 3 — | 24 August 1560 |
Anent the abolitioun of Idolatrie and of all actis contrair to the confessioun of fayth publist in this Parliament. About the abolition of idolatry, and of all acts contrary to the confession of faith published in this Parliament. (Repealed by Statute Law Revision (Scotland) Act 1906 (6 Edw. 7. c. 38))
| Abolition of Mass Act 1560 (repealed) | 1560 c. 4 — | 24 August 1560 |
Anent the abolitioun of the messe. About the abolition of the Mass. (Repealed by Statute Law Revision (Scotland) Act 1906 (6 Edw. 7. c. 38))

=== Sources ===
- Alexander, William (1841). "Acta Parliamentorum Mariæ Reginæ". An Abridgement of the Acts of the Parliaments of Scotland. Edinburgh: Adam and Charles Black. pp. A19 – A20 – via Google Books.
- Alexander, William (1841). "Acta Parliamentorum Mariæ Reginæ". An Abridgement of the Acts of the Parliaments of Scotland. Edinburgh: Adam and Charles Black. pp. A19 – A20 – via Google Books.
- Chronological Table of the Statutes. London: Her Majesty's Stationery Office. 1972. p. 1333 – via Google Books.
- "Acts of the Old Scottish Parliament: 1560". legislation.gov.uk. The National Archives.
- "Index of Statutes: Mary I (1542-1567)". Records of the Parliaments of Scotland to 1707. University of St Andrews.

== See also ==
- List of legislation in the United Kingdom
- Records of the Parliaments of Scotland
