= Mass rock =

Rock used as Roman Catholic altar

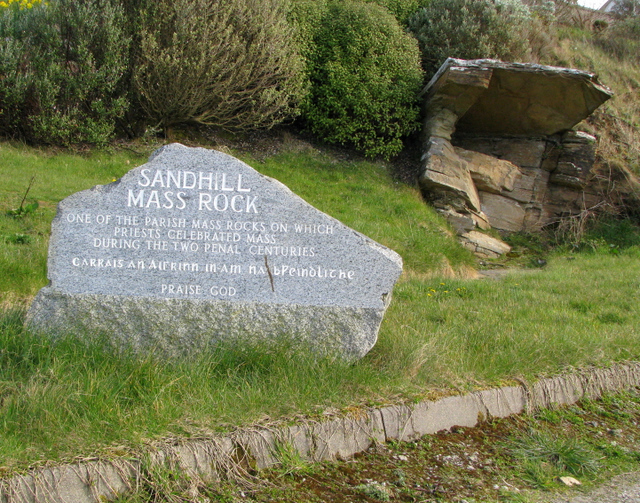
Sandhill Mass Rock site near Dunfanaghy, County Donegal

A Mass rock (Irish: Carraig an Aifrinn) was a rock used as an altar by the Catholic Church in Ireland, during the 17th and 18th centuries, as a location for secret and illegal gatherings of faithful attending the Mass offered by outlawed priests. Similar altars, known as Mass stones (Scottish Gaelic: Clachan Ìobairt), were used by the Catholic Church in Scotland, membership in which was similarly criminalised by the Scottish Reformation Parliament in 1560.

During the religious persecution of the Catholic Church in Ireland, isolated locations were sought to hold religious ceremonies, as observing the Catholic Mass was a matter of difficulty and danger at the time as a result of the Reformation in Ireland, Cromwell's campaign against the Irish, and the Penal Laws of 1695. Bishops were banished and priests had to register to preach under the Registration Act 1704. Priest hunters were also sometimes employed to arrest Catholic priests and nonjuring vicars of the Scottish Episcopal Church.

In modern Ireland, a number of Mass rocks remain places of pilgrimage by local Catholic parishioners, with open air Masses offered at some sites. In response to restrictions on indoor gatherings during the COVID-19 pandemic in Ireland, services were offered at several Mass rocks during 2020.

== Scotland ==
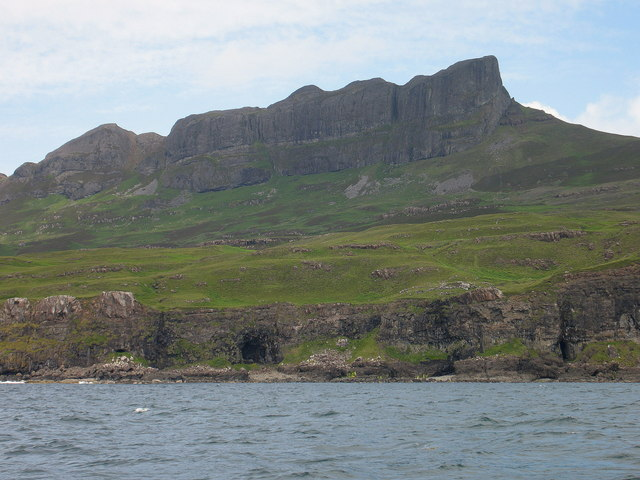
The entrance to Cathedral Cave upon the isle of Eigg, with An Sgùrr in the background

In Scotland, Mass stones were used by the Catholic Church in Scotland, membership in which had been criminalised by the Scottish Reformation Parliament in 1560 and which remained unlawful until Catholic Emancipation in 1829.

On the isle of Eigg, in the Inner Hebrides of Scotland, which was described in 1698 as almost entirely Roman Catholic, the laity secretly and illegally attended Mass at a Mass stone inside a large high-roofed coastal cave, which could only be accessed during low tide and which is still known as the "cave of worship" (Scottish Gaelic: Uamh Chràbhaichd; in English Cathedral Cave).

The island in Loch Morar known as Eilean Bàn was briefly the location first of a Mass stone and then of an illegal and clandestine Catholic minor seminary founded by Bishop James Gordon, until the Jacobite rising of 1715 forced its closure and eventual reopening at Scalan in Glenlivet. Even long afterwards, Eilean Bàn remained a secret chapel and library for Bishop Gordon's successors.

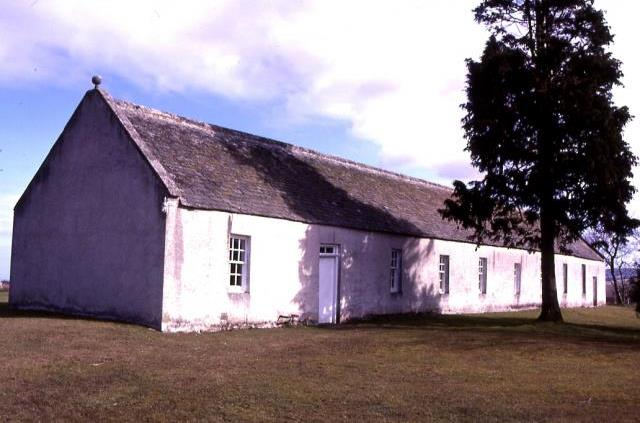
St. Ninian's Church was built in 1755 as a strictly illegal "Mass house" at Enzie, Moray.

=== Legacy ===
After Culloden much of the remaining Highland population converted to Presbyterianism. According to Marcus Tanner, "[the] Highlands, outside tiny Catholic enclaves like in South Uist and Barra, took on the contours they have since preserved - a region marked by a strong tradition of sabbatarianism".

The oral tradition preserved the former locations of Mass stones and Mass houses in at least some regions. According to the autobiography dictated to John Lorne Campbell by South Uist seanchaidh and crofter Angus Beag MacLellan (1869–1966), while working as a hired hand on Robert Menzies' farm near Aberfeldy, Perthshire in the 1880s, Menzies told him that a Mass stone had stood in the farm field. A nearby high cross, marked the site of an important college of learning dating from the days of the Celtic Church. Though the local population had long since switched to Presbyterianism, former Catholic religious sites were still locally viewed with superstitious awe and were never tampered with. Menzies explained that the term for Mass stones, in the Perthshire dialect, was Clachan Ìobairt, lit. "offering stones".

The 1467 ruins of St. Mahew's Chapel in Cardross, which stand on the site of a 6th-century Celtic Church monastery, are also the former location of a Mass stone. Before St Patrick's Church was formally organized in 1830, the growing population of Irish and Highland Scots Catholics living in nearby Dumbarton would meet at the chapel ruins for prayers and Masses offered by a visiting priest from Greenock. For this and other reasons, ownership of the chapel ruins were acquired by the Archdiocese of Glasgow, who restored them in 1955 into a Catholic church which remains in use.

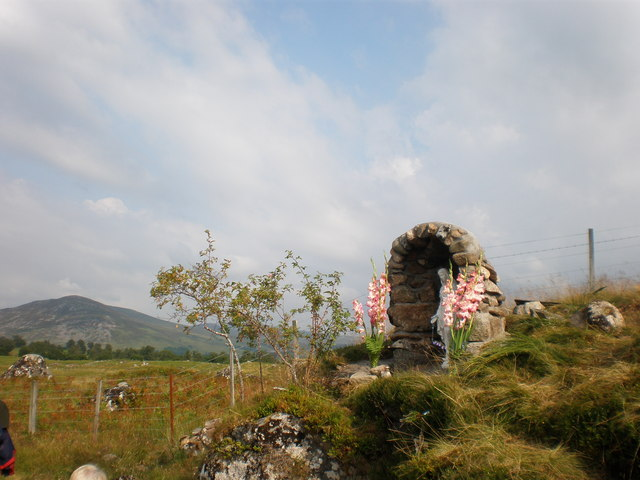
Marian grotto and Christian pilgrimage shrine dedicated to Our Lady of the Highlands on the grounds of Immaculate Conception Church at Stratherrick, near Whitebridge, Inverness-shire

At the Christian pilgrimage shrine to 'Our Lady of the Highlands', within the grounds of Immaculate Conception Roman Catholic Church near Loch Ness, a new outdoor Mass stone was consecrated by Bishop Hugh Gilbert of the Roman Catholic Diocese of Aberdeen in March 2017.

== Wales ==
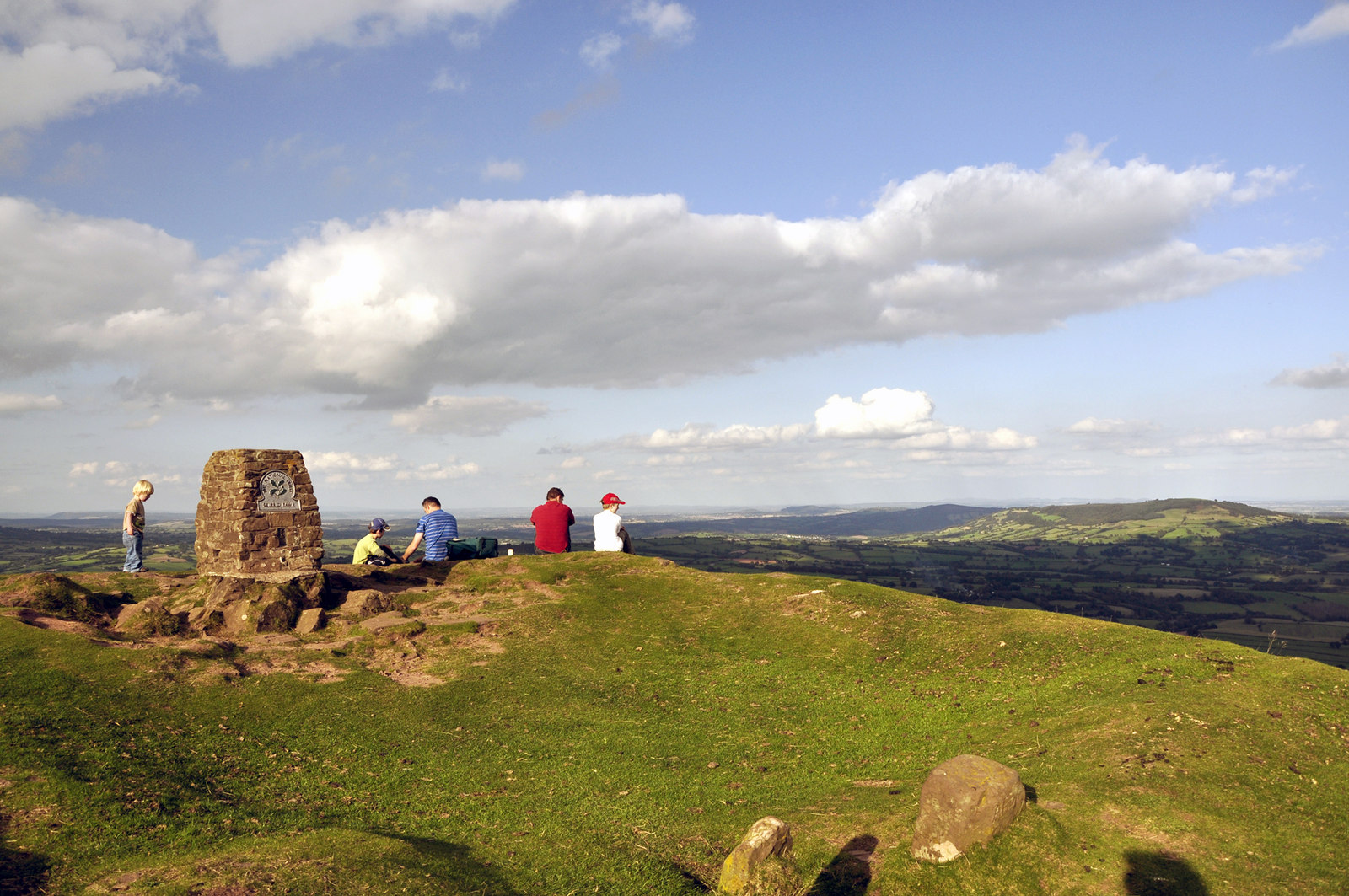
Site of St Michael's chapel, atop Ysgyryd Fawr

The ruins of an Iron Age hill fort and a mediæval chapel, dedicated to St. Michael, lie at the summit of Ysgyryd Fawr in the Black Mountains. During the religious persecution of the Catholic Church in Wales, the mountaintop remained a regular site of Christian pilgrimage. Furthermore, the illegal and underground Jesuit mission based at Cwm and led by future Catholic martyr St. David Lewis, regularly visited the ruined chapel atop Ysgyryd Fawr, which was the site of a Mass rock. In 1676, Pope Clement X promised a plenary indulgence to those who went up the mountain upon Michaelmas. In 1678, local magistrate and priest hunter John Arnold alleged in the House of Commons that, "he hath seen a hundred Papists meet at the top of Skyrrid for Mass."

== Ireland ==
=== Use and records ===
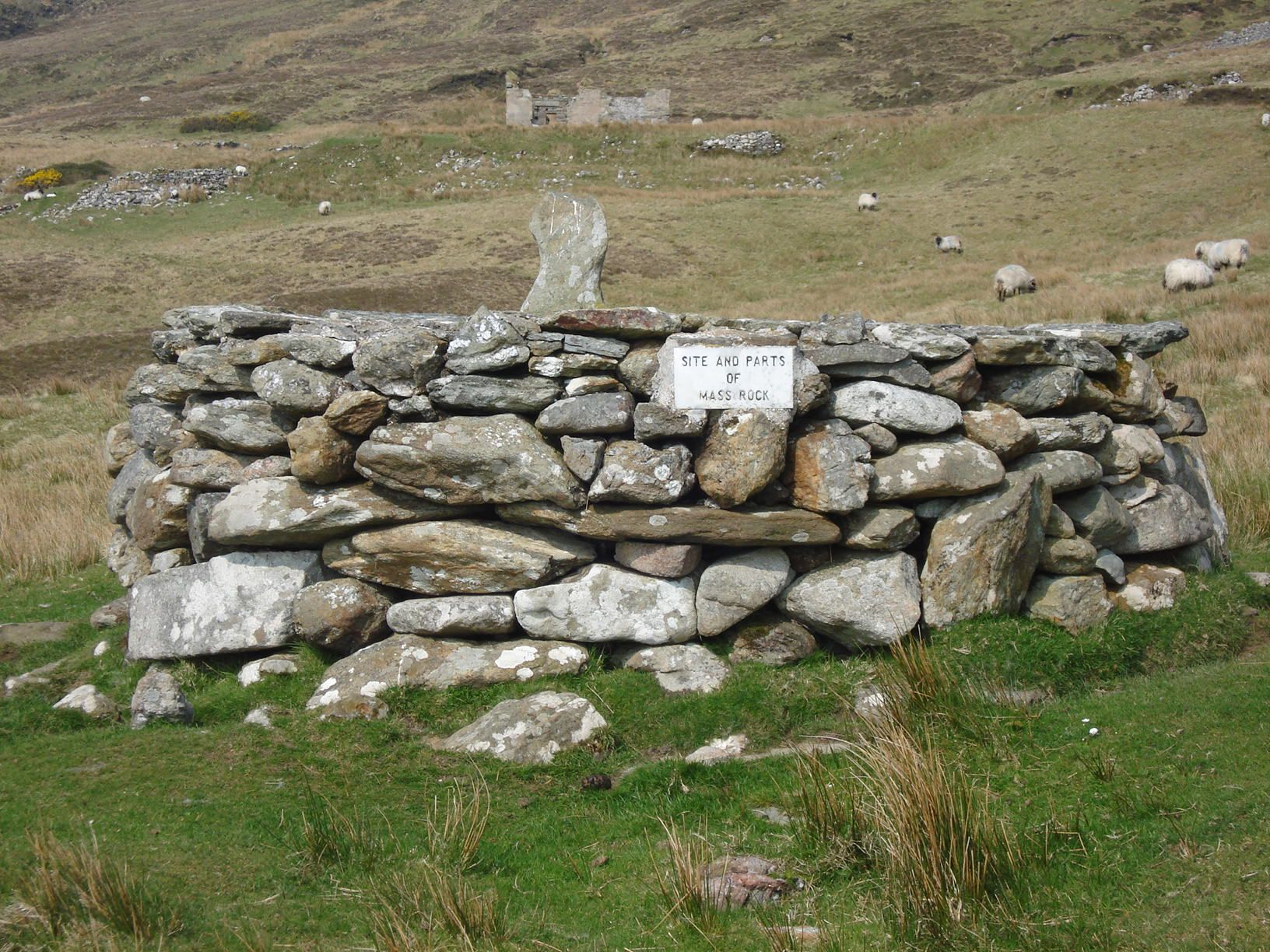
Mass rock on Achill Island, County Mayo

In Ireland, Mass rocks were in use from at least the mid-17th century. Tony Nugent, in a book about the history and folklore of Mass rocks, traces their use even earlier, to the 1536 Act of Supremacy and the 1540 Suppression of the Monasteries by Henry VIII. Particularly following the latter, stones were taken from the ruins of Pre-Reformation churches or monasteries, and relocated to more isolated areas, often with a simple cross carved on their tops, to continue being used for religious purposes. In addition, "megalithic tombs, ring-forts, stone circles, druidic altars, and wells - these monuments to a once proud race - were to be recycled by a persecuted people in order that they could practice their religion in secret".

Nugent also states that "until the passing of the Catholic Emancipation Act in 1829", the observation of Catholic ceremonies at Mass rocks was illegal and services were not regularly scheduled. Parishioners would therefore spread word of services at Mass rocks covertly. According to some sources, which were believed by Irish traditional musicians Seamus Ennis and Seosamh Ó hÉanaí, such communication could occur through two coded sets of Irish language lyrics to the Sean Nós song An raibh tú ag an gCarraig. Other sources question this association.

For example, the Mass rock near Kinvara, County Galway, is known in Connaught Irish as Poll na gCeann ("chasm of the heads") and is said to have been the location of a massacre by the New Model Army during the Cromwellian conquest of Ireland. Historian Tony Nugent states that, "According to local tradition, there was a college nearby and some of the student monks were killed there by Cromwellian soldiers while attending Mass and their heads were thrown into a nearby chasm".

During the Stuart Restoration, Catholic worship generally moved to thatched "Mass houses" (Irish: Cábán an Aifrinn, lit. ‘Mass Cabin’). Writing in 1668, Janvin de Rochefort commented, "Even in Dublin more than twenty houses where Mass is secretly said, and in about a thousand places, subterranean vaults and retired spots in the woods". Catholic worship, however, was soon to return to the Mass rocks due to the Exclusion Crisis and the anti-Catholic show trials masterminded by Lord Shaftesbury and Titus Oates.

According to a book on the history and folklore of Mass rocks by Tony Nugent, a Catholic priest named Fr. Mac Aidghalle was murdered c. 1681 while saying Mass at a mass rock still known in Ulster Irish as Cloch na hAltorach that stands atop Slieve Gullion, County Armagh. The perpetrators were a company of soldiers under the command of a priest hunter named Turner. Redmond O'Hanlon, the outlawed but de facto Chief of the Name of Clan O'Hanlon and leading local rapparee, is said in local oral tradition to have avenged the murdered priest and in so doing to have "sealed his own fate". The persecution and use of the Mass rocks escalated further following the 1688 overthrow of the House of Stuart, and the passing of the Penal Laws.

Priest hunters were used to track down Catholic priests, including those who held services on mass rocks. Thomas Burgos wrote in the Hibernia Dominica (1762): "Eager for blood money, with some Orange magistrate or landlord whose creed was hatred of papists as their master, accompanied by bands of soldiers, the priest-hounds hunted God's ministers night and day. A race of men whose love of money and hatred of Christianity peculiarly fitted them for the work, were employed to chase priests out of their hiding places, and drag them from their lurking holes. These agents of persecution assumed the garb of priests and went through the ceremonies of the Catholic religion. They thus wormed themselves into the confidence of the unwary, from whom they learned the names and haunts of concealed priests. Thus the clergy were tracked to their most secret retreats, and dragged sometimes from the very altar, robed in their sacred vestments, before tribunals, which sentenced them to perpetual banishment."

While being interviewed by Tadhg Ó Murchú of the Irish Folklore Commission, Peig Minihane-O'Driscoll of Ardgroom, of the Beara Peninsula in County Cork said that the local Mass rock, known in Munster Irish as Clochán a' tSagairt was located at a cairn to the south. Minihane-O'Driscoll also stated that her husband had been born before Catholic Emancipation and that her in-laws had twice carried their baby son up into the Slieve Miskish Mountains, seeking to secretly make contact and request the baptism of their son from one of the two outlawed priest known to be in hiding locally, one near Ballycrovane Wood and another near Castletownbere.

=== Later use ===
After the successful 1780-1829 fight for Catholic Emancipation and, for example, the 1851 Synod of Thurles, the use of Mass rocks in Ireland declined. They continued to be used as places of worship in some regions, however, where "poverty and bigotry, rather than persecution, dictated their use".

Partial data on Mass rock sites is maintained by the Archaeological Survey of Ireland (for pre-1700 sites), and, to a lesser extent, the National Inventory of Architectural Heritage (for post-1700 sites). Some of the Mass rock places may also have been used for patterns.

In 2020, because of the restrictions on indoor gatherings during the COVID-19 pandemic in Ireland, there were proposals to hold services at some Mass rocks.

=== Folklore ===
"February 3, 1828

...There is a lonely path near Uisce Dun and Móinteán na Cisi which is called the Mass Boreen. The name comes from the time when the Catholic Church was persecuted in Ireland, and Mass had to be said in woods and on moors, on wattled places in bogs, and in caves. But as the proverb says, It is better to look forward with one eye than to look backwards with two..."

— Cín Lae Amhlaoibh by Amhlaoibh Ó Súilleabháin (1780 – 1838). Translated by Tomás de Bhaldraithe.

According to a book of history and folklore associated with Mass rocks by Tony Nugent, "There is a common story associated with quite a few which relates how the priest was shot or killed at the moment of Transubstantiation. There is a common belief that at this point in the Mass the priest cannot stop for any reason. There are various stories of Protestant neighbours hiding or helping priests. There are stories of miracles, the story of the widow's hunger, happening at these sites, stories of cures and indeed a whole fabric of folklore which if lost would be a cultural tragedy".

Though the name of Fr. John O'Neill does not appear on the 1992 list of Catholic priests known to have served locally, a local oral tradition alleges that he was the last Catholic priest killed at a Mass rock, at Inse an tSagairt, near Bonane, County Kerry, c.1829. The local "folk belief" suggests that a criminal gang, based in Glengarriff and consisting of a woman and five men, conspired to kill the priest and split a £45 bounty among themselves. According to the story, after capturing Fr. O'Neill, beheading him, and bringing his severed head to Cork city, the six conspirators learned that Catholic Emancipation had just been signed into law and that no reward would be given. The perpetrators then allegedly threw O'Neill's severed head into the River Lee in frustration. Other versions of the story hold that O'Neill's clerk was also taken prisoner and brought to Dromore Castle, but later managed to escape by being carried to safety by the "two mastiff bloodhounds" that were sent to pursue him. The site at Inse an tSagairt was also associated with the reputed miraculous cure of the mother of Fr. Eugene Daly. Both Fr. O'Neill's martyrdom and the cure of Mrs. Daly have been commemorated in locally composed poetry. A hiking path was later built to the site in 1981, by Coillte, at the insistence of Fr. Daly (who died in 2001). Inse an tSagairt is still sometimes used for open air commemorative Masses and there is a plaque next to the altar which names Fr. John O'Neill. Other Mass rock locations in the same area were an Alhóir, near the summit of Mount Esker, An Seana-Shéipeil at Garrymore, and Faill-a Shéipéil at Gearha.

== Parallels in other faiths ==
During the same era in mainland Britain, Puritans, Presbyterians, Quakers, Anabaptists, and other non-Conformists held similarly outlawed conventicles in defiance of the Royal Supremacy and then of the Protectorate of England under Oliver Cromwell.

For the Lutheran minority during the Counter-Reformation in the Austrian Empire, a similar stone in Paternion was dubbed the hundskirche.

== See also ==
- Irish Catholic Martyrs
- Mass path
- Mass rocks in Clontibret
- Mass rock (Portglenone)
