= Mass rock (Portglenone) =

The Mass Rock which is located on Hamillstown Lane, Largy, Portglenone

The Mass rock of Portglenone (also called the 'Old Altar') is one of several hundred Mass rocks in Ireland. Located at Portglenone in County Antrim, the rock was used during the mid-seventeenth century in an isolated location for Catholic Mass. These times were a period dominated by the Penal Laws and known as the Penal Times.

== History ==
=== Ahoghill and Portglenone Parishes ===
Portglenone Parish was formerly part of Ahoghill Parish, with this Mass rock at one end of the area. Some of the parish priests who would have said Mass here included:

- Fr. Henry O'Duffin (ordained by St. Oliver Plunkett in 1678) was appointed in 1704 after being registered as a parish priest with seventeen others in County Antrim.
- Fr. Shield (a Franciscan from Cranfield) succeeded him until he was appointed Bishop in 1725.
- Fr. Stephen Grant was here from 1725 to 1771.
- Fr. John Cassidy (from Ballymacpeake) served from 1771 to 1819. During this time the church at Aughnahoy was built as the main church in the extended parish.
- Fr. Peter McNally (1819–1825).
- Fr. Patrick O'Neill (1825–1832).
- Fr. John Lynch (from Portglenone, 1832–1847) helped to erect the present church in Ahoghill which opened in 1837.
- Fr. John McCourt (1847–1886) presided over the building of the church in Cullybackey

In 1866, Portglenone became a separate parish with Fr. McConnell as the first parish priest. He died in 1876 having helped erect the present church and school. The church was opened and dedicated the "Church of the Blessed Virgin, Mary Immaculate" on 10 September 1871.

=== Modern day ===
In the 20th century, Mass was celebrated at the rock on at least three occasions:

- 1920: Following a mission held in the parish, The Irish News reported on 2 June 1920; "The close of the Mission brought a rather unique celebration on Monday morning when Mass was celebrated at the Old Altar in the Largy. This rude and secluded old structure hidden away remotely from the human eye proved a beacon light of the ancient faith of our forefathers in the valley of the Bann for almost two centuries".
- 1971: After the ordination of Fr Tom McDonnell, Mass was celebrated here before he travelled to Kenya in Africa to begin his missionary work.
- 1996: The Silver Jubilee of Father McDonnell's ordination was marked with a parish Mass at the Old Altar.

As of the 21st century, two Masses have been said so far at the rock:

- 2000: The new millennium was welcomed and celebrated with a Mass on 17 September 2000
- 2011: The 40th anniversary of Fr Tom McDonnell's ordination was celebrated on Sunday 12 June 2011.
