= Immaculate Conception Parish Church, Stratherrick =

Immaculate Conception Church, Stratherrick
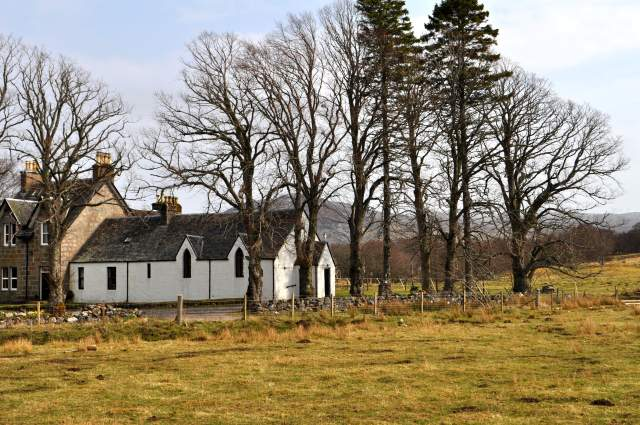
- Immaculate Conception Church, Stratherrick
- 57°13′09″N 4°29′39″W
- Location: Whitebridge, Inverness-shire
- Country: Scotland
- Denomination: Roman Catholic
- Website: lochnessparishes.dioceseofaberdeen.org

History
- Status: Parish church

Architecture
- Functional status: Active
- Architect(s): Ross & Joass of Dingwall
- Architectural type: Church
- Completed: 1859

Administration
- Diocese: Aberdeen
- Deanery: Highlands
- Parish: Loch Ness Catholic Parishes

Clergy
- Priest: Fr Andrzej Harden SJ

Immaculate Conception Church, Stratherrick is in the Dalcrag area of Whitebridge (Scottish Gaelic: An Drochaid Bhàn), Inverness-shire, in the Highlands of Scotland and is a served by the Roman Catholic Diocese of Aberdeen. It is an active parish church served from St Mary's Church, Inverness. It forms part of the grouping "Loch Ness Catholic Parishes". It is also the location of the Christian pilgrimage shrine to 'Our Lady of the Highlands' within its grounds. A new outdoor Mass stone at this shrine, or Marian grotto, was consecrated by Bishop Hugh Gilbert in March 2017.

== History ==
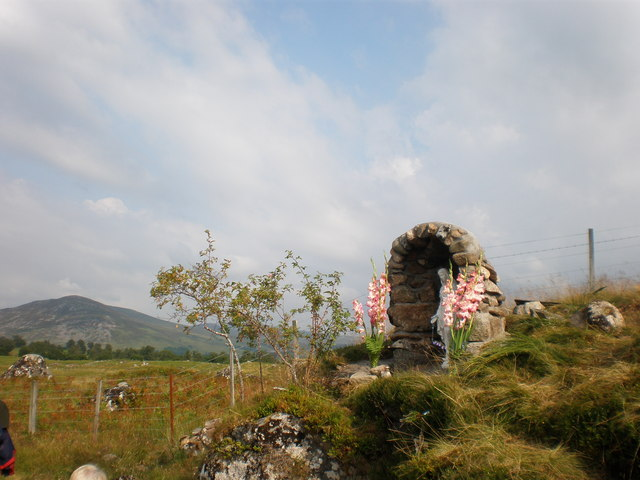
Grotto in the church grounds

The church was built following Catholic Emancipation in 1859 by Ross and Joass. The original wooden altar was later replaced by one in marble which was removed from St Mary's, Nairn. Prior to the church being built, the Tridentine Mass was offered in a house in Dalcrag by a priest based in Glenmoriston, who rowed across Loch Ness to say Mass.

St. Mary MacKillop visited this church on 12–13 December 1873, during a visit from Australia and remarked upon the clean and simple quarters of the Parish Priest, Fr. Bissett.
