= Religion in the Outer Hebrides =

The Outer Hebrides are a unique religious area in contemporary Scotland. The northern island (Lewis and Harris) is dominated by Calvinist "free churches", and has been described as "the last bastion of Sabbath observance in the UK". It is also home to a unique form of Gaelic psalm singing known as precenting. The southern islands of South Uist and Barra are the last remnants of native pre-Reformation Scottish Catholicism. Barra was once dubbed "the island the Reformation did not reach".

The Outer Hebrides are also home to some of Britain's most important pre-Christian religious sites. The most significant is the Callanish Stones on the isle of Lewis, which are notable megalithic sites dating back some 5000 years.

== Catholicism in the Outer Hebrides ==
=== Current status ===
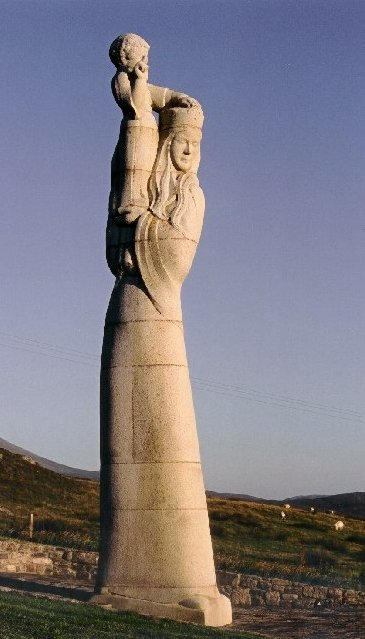
Our Lady of the Isles, on South Uist

The 2011 Scottish Census found that unlike those in the Northern islands, the people of the southern islands were predominantly Catholic. South Uist, the second most populated of the Outer Hebrides, was 90% Catholic, while Barra was 81.5% Catholic. The small islands of Eriskay (94%) and Vatersay (90%) were also heavily Catholic, while Benbecula, further north, was more evenly divided between Catholics (55%) and Protestants (45%), making the southernmost of the Outer Hebrides are the most Catholic parts of all of Scotland. The two most Catholic civil parishes in the entire country are in the Outer Hebrides:

Civil Parish	Council Area	% Catholic
South Uist	Na h-Eileanan Siar	90
Barra	Na h-Eileanan Siar	81.5
Port Glasgow	Inverclyde	49.8
Old Monkland	City of Glasgow	46.3
Greenock	Inverclyde	41.0

=== History ===
==== From the earliest period to the Reformation ====
Little is known of the history of Christianity in the Outer Hebrides prior to the 11th century. Christianity came to the region via the Irish. The Church had been established in Ireland no later than 400. Irish chieftains established the Kingdom of Dál Riata in what is today Argyll and the Inner Hebrides around the year 500. Moreover, according to tradition the Irish monk St. Columba established an abbey on the small island of Iona off the coast of Mull in 563. These are the foundations of the spread of Christianity to the Western Isles.

Supposedly St. Barr (or St. Finbarr), Bishop of Cork, visited the island of Barra and gave it his name in the late 500s. The ruins of a 12th-century church, Kilbar Church (Cille Bharra), can be seen today in the village of Eoligarry on Barra. There is speculation that this church was built atop an older chapel dating back to the seventh century. Numerous monasteries and churches were established throughout the Hebrides in this period under the leadership of Iona. Seven existed in the Western Isles, including three in Lewis, one on Bernera, one at Kilcholmkill on North Uist, one at Kilcholambkille on Benbecula, and one at Howmore on South Uist.

Norsemen began raiding the Hebrides in the 790s, with the most famous being the sacking of Iona Abbey and the murder of 68 monks there in 806. Due to repeated attacks, the abbey was abandoned by 825 and all the Hebrides gradually fell under the control of pagan Vikings. For roughly two centuries Celtic Christians were forced to live under pagan rule. It seems that the Church throughout the Hebrides turned again to Ireland as Viking control had cut the region off from the rest of Scotland. The Norse converted, at least nominally, to Christianity in the eleventh century and the southernmost of the Western Isles were placed under the newly created Diocese of Sodor and Man (later the Diocese of the Isles).

The thirteenth century saw both the Church and the state in the Outer Hebrides begin shifting from Norse to Scottish rule. The first bishops from outside the Kingdom of the Isles sat in the bishop's chair of the Diocese of the Isles in the mid-13th century. Following the Treaty of Perth in 1266, all the Western Isles came under the formal rule of the King of Scotland, although real authority was exercised by the chief of the MacDonalds as Lord of the Isles.

The Church in the Hebrides remained part of the Diocese of the Isles until the Reformation. A 16th century description says this diocese was "the most scattered, and also one of the poorest, in the pre-Reformation Church [in] Scotland". Few priests were present to serve the Church here, and those who did serve in the region secured their positions by clan ties rather than by piety, and were more interested in church income than in spreading the faith. On the eve of the Reformation, the Bishop of the Isles sent his relative Fr. Donald Munro to make an inventory of all the prominent parishes of the diocese. This document, Description of the Western Isles of Scotland, was written in 1549, and is the oldest known description of the Outer Hebrides. At the time there was one parish church on Barra and five on the islands of North Uist, Benbecula, and South Uist combined. Vatersay had a chapel.

== Religion in Lewis ==
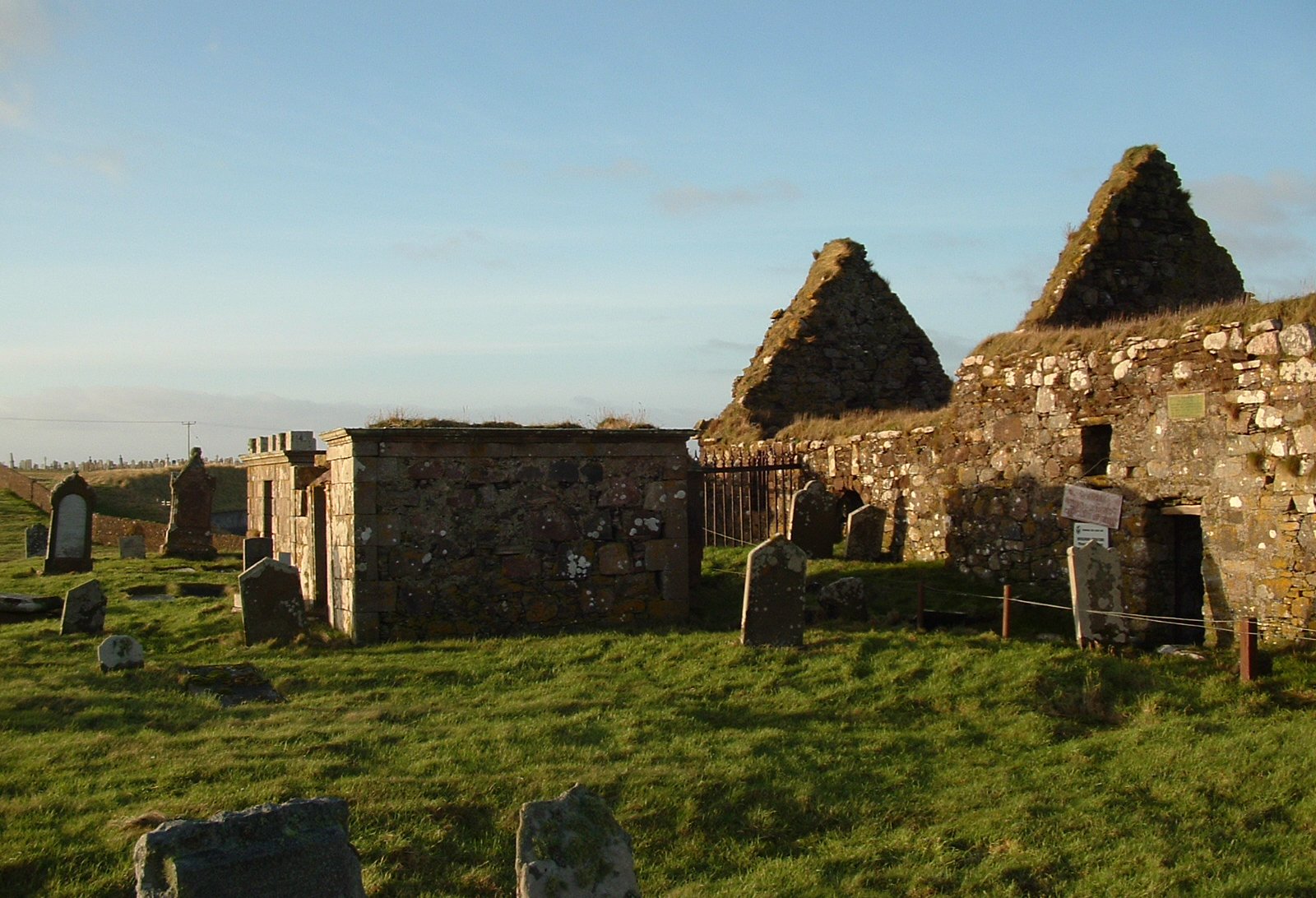
St Columba's Church, Aignish, Isle of Lewis

Religion is important in Lewis, with much of the population belonging to one of six Presbyterian churches represented on the Island: the Free Church (13 congregations) the Church of Scotland (11 congregations), the Free Presbyterian Church (four congregations), the Free Church (Continuing) (three congregations), and a congregation of each of the Associated Presbyterian Churches, and the Reformed Presbyterian Church of Scotland. While Presbyterianism dominates Lewis, other Christian denominations have a presence with a Scottish Episcopal (Anglican) church, a Roman Catholic church, a corps of The Salvation Army, a New Wine Church, Stornoway Baptist Church and Failte Church. Furthermore, there is LDS Church and a Jehovah's Witness Kingdom Hall in Stornoway. A small Asian community beginning in the 1930s and reaching 300 at its peak introduced Islam to the islands. This community had fallen to eight families on Lewis (and one family on Harris) by 2010. By August 2017, plans were officially approved to build the first mosque in the area. Bahá'í Faith has been on Isle of Lewis since 1953.

The Christian Sabbath is generally observed but some shops and licensed premises are open on Sunday. Since 2002, there is a scheduled air service to mainland Scotland and since July 2009 a limited ferry service on Sunday.

=== Stornoway Sabbath ===
Stornoway, like the northern (Protestant) Hebrides as a whole, has a tradition of adherence to the Christian Sabbath (Sundays). As Stornoway has most of the island's services, shops and businesses, it undergoes the most visible change on a Sunday and is often seen as a focal point for the issue.

In recent years more transport services have begun operating on a Sunday. The first Sunday air service began in October 2002 and was met by protests from church groups under the banner of the Lord's Day Observance Society. The Sunday air services have expanded – there are now two return flights to Inverness and one to Glasgow – as well as becoming generally more accepted.

Ferry travel on Sundays from Lewis and Harris started when Caledonian MacBrayne (Calmac) introduced a Sunday service for the Sound of Harris ferry. The introduction of this service was not directly met with protests, but an opposing petition was signed by a significant majority of the local (South Harris) population.

It was announced on 14 July 2009 that Calmac would begin regular Sunday sailings from 19 July 2009. Before this, they would operate additional sailings on Sundays if several previous sailings had been cancelled, to clear the backlog of traffic. Calmac said that they took legal advice that not implementing Sunday sailings would be against human rights law. Objections on religious grounds were raised to Calmac's decision to start Sunday ferries.

There are still marked differences between Sundays on Lewis and Harris and those elsewhere in Britain and this particular example of Sunday observance survives only here, with the Sabbath continuing to be considered a day of rest. Opposition to a more cosmopolitan Sunday is not exclusively for religious reasons, though the strong Presbyterian (mainly Free Church) makeup of the island undoubtedly is a major force behind campaigns to retain Sunday's peaceful nature.

Hotels and restaurants are generally open along with most bars (some with shorter opening periods). A single Stornoway petrol station, Engebret, and its associated shop, is open from 11 am to 4 pm. Another shop is open at Great Bernera. Sunday newspapers are not available, as distributors will not work on Sundays.

==== Polls ====
A poll conducted in 2000 showed slightly more than 60% of islanders in favour of having ferry and air travel available on Sundays, though a still larger majority wanted a referendum on such matters – something that has not taken place. The same poll showed a clear majority against the opening of shops on Sunday.

== Religion in Harris ==
Harris has a largely Presbyterian population that still practises sabbatarianism. Most retail outlets are shut on Sunday. Those that conduct business on Sundays are known to be regularly visited by locals attempting to convince shop owners to shut down, the exception being the local pubs. This area has been described as the last bastion of conservative Calvinism in Britain, and there was controversy in 2006 when Calmac started a Sunday ferry service between Berneray and Harris and in 2010 between Stornoway and the mainland.

In Harris, there are seven congregations of the Catholic Church, five congregations of the Church of Scotland, five of the Free Church of Scotland, three congregations of the Free Church Continuing, and three Free Presbyterian Church of Scotland congregations.
