= Irish Scottish people =

Scottish ethnic group with Irish Ancestry

Irish-Scots
Regions with significant populations
- Coatbridge, Edinburgh, Glasgow, Dumbarton, Dundee, Inverclyde

Languages
- English (Irish/Scottish), Irish, Scottish Gaelic, Scots

Religion
- Predominantly Roman Catholic, some Protestant

Related ethnic groups
- Scottish, Irish, English, Welsh, Manx, Cornish, Bretons, Scots-Irish, Ulster Scots

Irish-Scots (Scottish Gaelic: Albannaich ri sinnsireachd Èireannach) are people in Scotland who have Irish ancestry.

Although Gaelic peoples, including Scots, originated in Ireland to begin with, having likely settled from what is now Scotland at the beginning of human history on the Irish island, ethnic Irish migration to Scotland increased in the nineteenth century, and was highest following the Great Famine. This played a major role, even before Catholic Emancipation in 1829, in rebuilding and re-establishing the formerly illegal Catholic Church in Scotland following centuries of religious persecution. In this period, the Irish typically settled in urban slum neighborhoods and around industrial areas. Irish ancestry is by far the most common foreign ancestry in Scotland.

Famous Irish-Scots include Irish republican and socialist revolutionary James Connolly, author Sir Arthur Conan Doyle, left-wing politician George Galloway, actors Sean Connery, Brian Cox, Peter Capaldi and Gerard Butler, musicians Gerry Rafferty, Maggie Reilly, Jimme O'Neill, Clare Grogan and Fran Healy and stand-up comedians Sir Billy Connolly, Fern Brady, and Frankie Boyle.

The term Irish-Scots is different from Ulster-Scots (sometimes known as Scots-Irish), a term used to denote those in the Irish province of Ulster who are descended from Lowland Scots and Northern English Protestants who settled there in large numbers during the Plantation of Ulster and subsequently.

== Background ==
Attitudes to the waves of immigration from Ireland to Scotland were mixed, as evidenced by the following quotations:

In our opinion, the Irish have as much right to come to this country to better their lives as the Scots and English have to go to Ireland or any other part of Britain for the same reason. Let us hear no more complaints about the influx of Irish having a bad effect on Scotland unless it is to do something about tackling the problems which caused the emigration.

— The Glasgow Courier, 1830

The immigration of such a number of people from the lowest class and with no education will have a bad effect on the population. So far, living among the Scots does not seem to have improved the Irish, but the native Scots who live in among the Irish have got worse. It is difficult to imagine the effect the Irish immigrants will have upon the morals and habits of the Scottish people.

— Report from the Scottish Census of 1871

Difficulties also arose due to differences between the largely Catholic Irish immigrants and the predominantly Protestant native Scots population. Towards the end of the eighteenth century, before the Irish began arriving in large numbers it was reported that, in Glasgow, there were only thirty-nine Catholics, but forty-three anti-Catholic clubs (see ).

In the UK census of 2001, the new category "Irish" was added to the list of white ethnic background. In Scotland, results showed that 49,428 (0.98%), fewer than 1% of the population, self-described as being of Irish background.

The Irish-Scots were instrumental in the formation of Hibernian F.C. in Edinburgh in 1875. There followed in 1887 in Glasgow, Celtic Football Club, founded with the purpose of alleviating poverty in the immigrant Irish population in the East End of Glasgow and later Dundee United F.C. (originally known as Dundee Hibernian), as well as numerous smaller teams. These football teams were originally formed to provide recreational facilities for the Irish immigrants.

== Scots and Irish ==
The terms Scots and Irish, while they have a settled meaning today, are not always readily distinguished. Sellar & Yeatman's spoof history 1066 and All That highlighted the confusion that these words can cause when used to refer to the past :

The Scots (originally Irish, but by now Scots) were at this time inhabiting Ireland, having driven the Irish (Picts) out of Scotland; while the Picts (originally Scots) were now Irish (living in brackets) and vice versa. It is essential to keep these distinctions clearly in mind (and verce visa).

== See also ==
- The Irish Scots and the Scotch-Irish – John C. Linehan (ISBN 0-7884-0788-0)
