= Papal Jurisdiction Act 1560 =

Act of the parliament of Scotland restricting Papal authority

- Act of Parliament
- Parliament of Scotland
- Long title: Concerning the jurisdictioun and autoritie of the bischope of Rome callit the Paip.
- Citation: 1560 c. 2
- Territorial extent: Kingdom of Scotland

Dates
- Royal assent: 24 August 1560

Status: Current legislation

Text of the Papal Jurisdiction Act 1560 as in force today (including any amendments) within the United Kingdom, from legislation.gov.uk.

The Papal Jurisdiction Act 1560 (c. 2) is an Act of the Parliament of Scotland which is still in force. It declares that the Pope has no jurisdiction in Scotland and prohibits any person from seeking any title or right to be exercised in Scotland granted under the authority of the Pope, on pain of proscription, banishment and disqualification from holding any public office or honour.

== Extract ==
The thre estaitis then being present vnderstanding that the Jurisdictioune and autoritie of the bischope of Rome callit the paip vsit within this realme in tymes bipast hes bene verray hurtful and preiudiciall to our soueranis autoritie and commone weill of this realme Thairfoir hes statute and ordanit that the bischope of Rome haif na Jurisdictioun nor autoritie within this realme in tymes cuming And that nane of our saidis soueranis subiectis of this realme sute or desire in ony tyme heireftir title or rycht be the said bischope of Rome or his sait to ony thing within this realme vnder the panis of barratrye That is to say proscriptioune banischement and neuir to bruke honour office nor dignitie within this realme... And that na bischop nor vther prelat of this realme vse ony Jurisdictioun in tymes to cum be the said bischop of Romeis autoritie vnder the pane foirsaid

== Usage ==
The Scottish Catholic hierarchy was restored by Pope Leo XIII in 1878 without legal reaction and remains in place today.

== See also ==
- Judiciary of Scotland
- Scots law
- Temporal jurisdiction (papacy)
