= Whitebridge, Scotland =

Village on Loch Ness in northern Scotland

Coordinates: 57°12′15″N 4°30′8″W

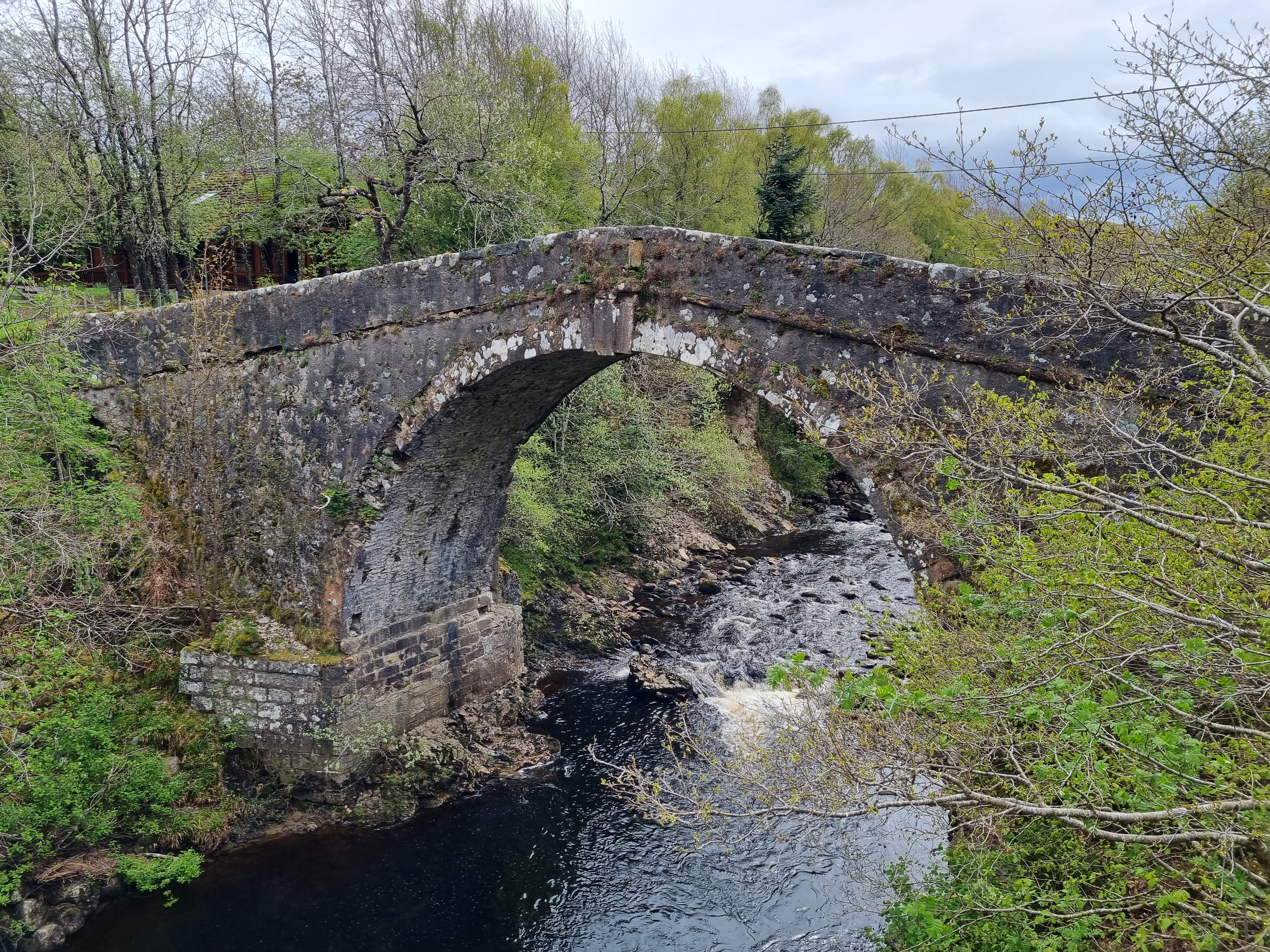
The old Bridge, constructed in 1732 from which Whitebridge derives its name.

Whitebridge (Scottish Gaelic: An Drochaid Bhàn) is a small village on the southwest side of Loch Ness in northern Scotland.

== Geography ==
It is roughly 25 miles (40 kilometres) from Inverness and eight miles (thirteen kilometres) from Fort Augustus. Whitebridge is home to fewer than 100 people spread over roughly five miles (eight kilometres). Loch Killin is situated approximately five miles (eight kilometres) southeast of the village and the neighbouring village of Gorthleck lies to the north-east of Whitebridge. Beinn Sgurrach is the highest hill in the area at 470 m and lies on the northeastern edge of the village.

== History ==
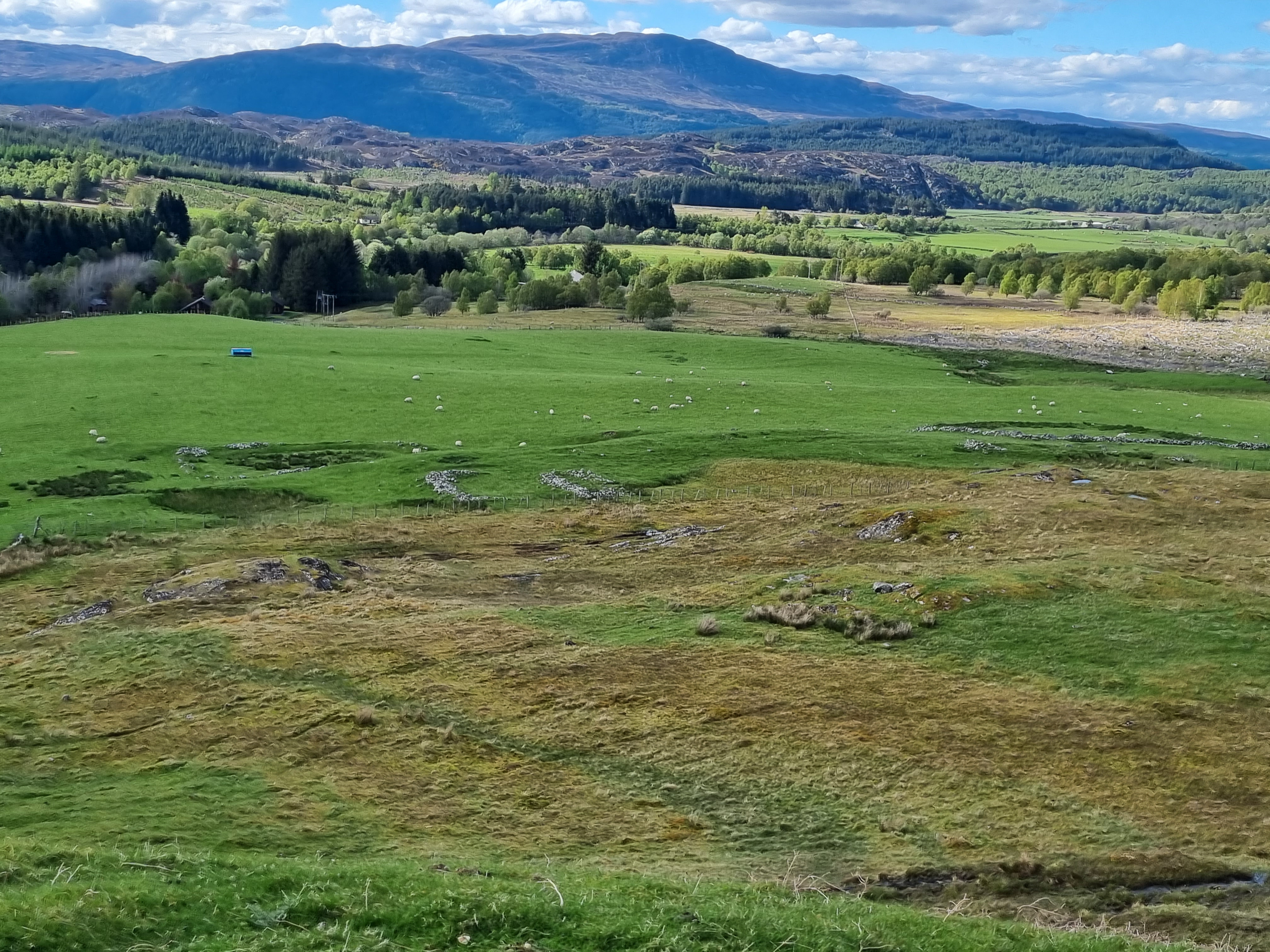
The abandoned settlement of Duntirhal which lies west of Beinn Sgurrach in Whitebridge.

The village's name comes from the old bridge over the River Fechlin which flows past the village. The old bridge, known as the Whitebridge due to the colouring of its stonework, was constructed in 1732 under the overall supervision of General Wade as part of a wider scheme to construct a military road through the area, in an attempt to suppress further Jacobite uprisings. The bridge construction was likely supervised locally under William Caulfield, a subordinate of Wades. The road is now the B862 and is the primary road through the village. A new rubble faced concrete road bridge was added in the 1930s alongside the old bridge. The old bridge is still accessible to pedestrians.

Duntirhal is a former ruined historic settlement located on the edge of Whitebridge in a sheep field towards Beinn Sgurrach. At one point in time, the settlement consisted of up to 24 rectangular buildings and 5 enclosures, as well as corn-drying kilns, although only a few partial foundations remain visible. Another abandoned township, also part of the Highland Clearances lies to the west of Whitebridge at Easter Drummond.

Whitebridge hotel and inn is a prominent structure in the village and is believed to have originated as a coaching inn (or Kingshouse) on the site of the military camp used by the builders of the military road. The current building functions as inn and was built in 1899.

== Economy ==
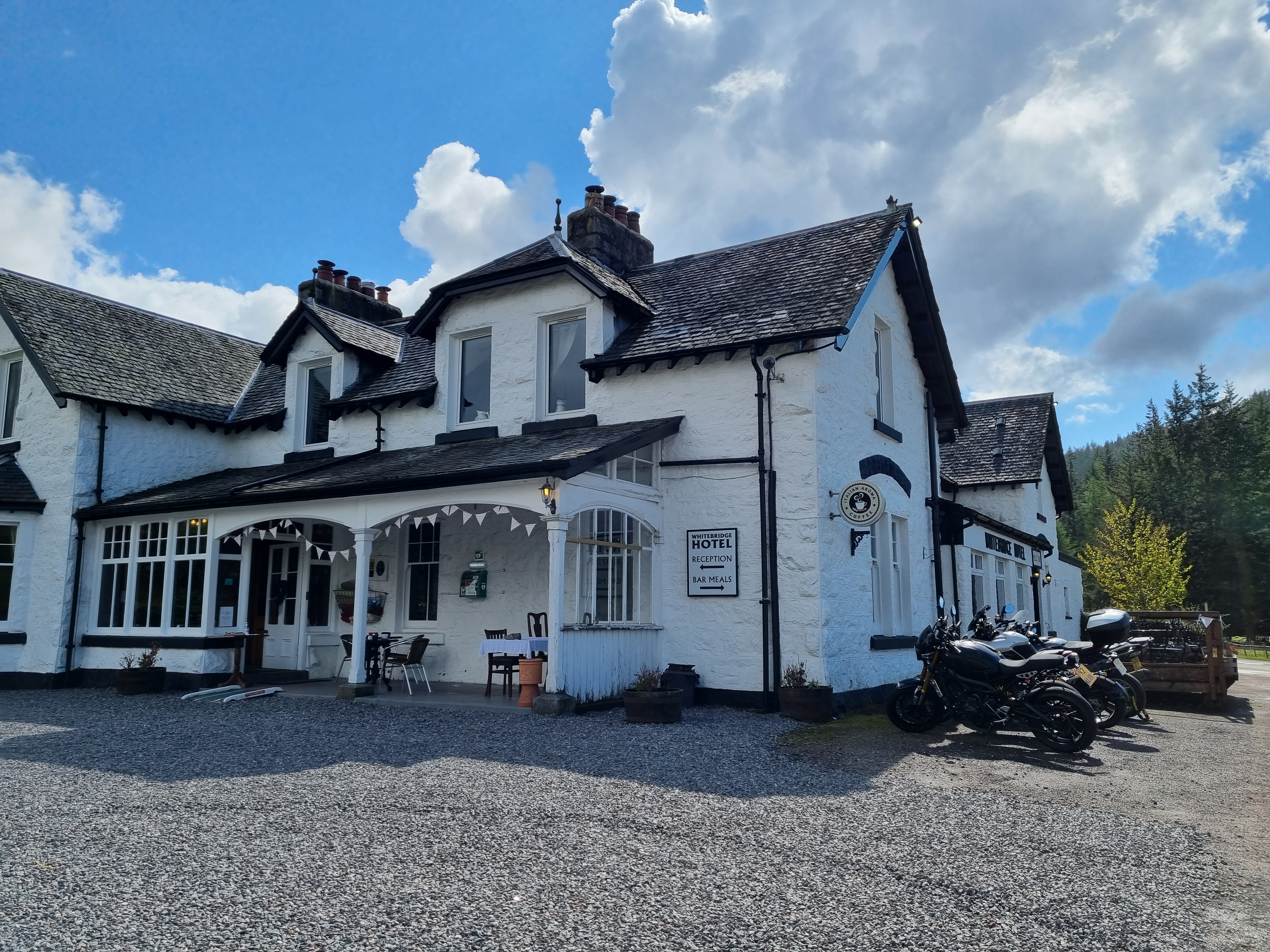
Whitebridge Hotel in the centre of the village on the B862 road.

The economy of the area is focused around agriculture, tourism and forestry activities. Many of the permanent residents are farmers or gamekeepers, or commute to work elsewhere in Inverness-shire. Along with the Whitebridge hotel, there is a small holiday park in the village which contains highland style lodges.

Most children attend Stratherrick Primary School in the neighbouring village of Gorthleck. The annual Loch Ness Marathon starts near Whitebridge.

== Famous residents ==
The village was home to award-winning Scottish poet Ian Abbot (1947–1989) during his later life. He wrote the collection Avoiding the Gods. Abbot died during a car accident in the village.
