= Robert Logan of Restalrig =

Scottish knight (1555–1606)

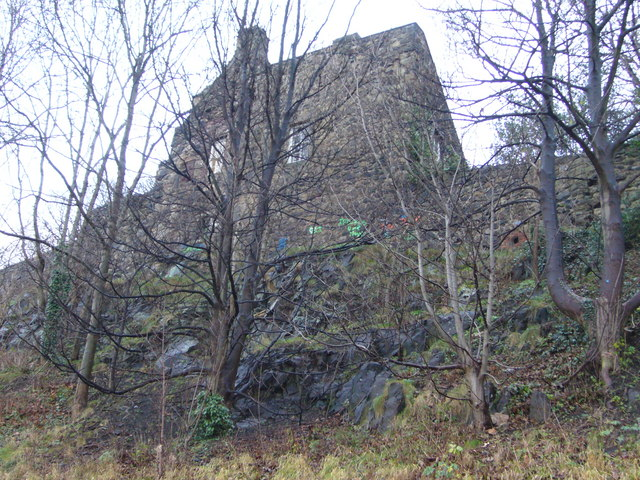
Robert Logan's home, Lochend Castle, at Restalrig

Sir Robert Logan of Restalrig (c.1555-July 1606) was a Scottish knight who was allegedly involved in the Gowrie House affair of 1600.

== Family background ==
Robert Logan's father and grandfather were also called "Robert Logan of Restalrig".

In 1547, his father, Robert Logan of Restalrig, was first married to Margaret Seton, daughter of George Seton, 6th Lord Seton. His second wife was Agnes Gray, daughter of Patrick Gray, 4th Lord Gray.

During the crisis of the Scottish Reformation in 1559, Robert Logan Senior took his Leith followers to face the French troops of Henri Cleutin at Cupar Muir. Later, he advised against resistance at Leith by the Protestant Lords of the Congregation against the French troops of Mary of Guise, which led to a short-lived truce by the terms of the Articles of Leith.

After Robert Logan Senior died, his widow Agnes Gray married Alexander Home, 5th Lord Home. Her son, Robert Logan of Restalrig (d. 1606), married Elizabeth Makgill, daughter of David Makgill of Cranston-Riddell; then Jonet Ker; and finally Marion Ker. Robert's first wife, Elizabeth Makgill, after their divorce married Sir Thomas Kennedy of Culzean, Tutor of Cassilis.

A daughter was christened at Fast Castle in May 1590, which was attended by the Earl of Bothwell and Lord Home.

=== Logan properties ===
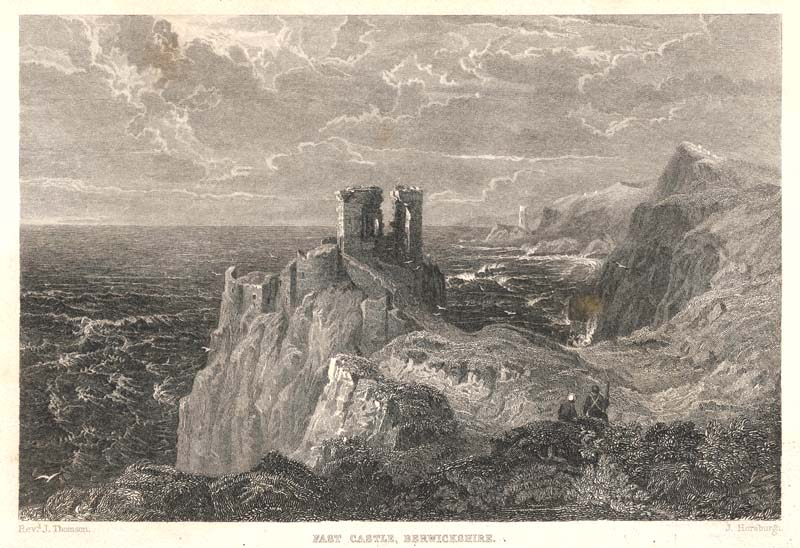
19th-century engraving of Fast Castle, which was involved in Robert's alleged plot to adbduct James VI of Scotland

The Logan family lived at Lochend Castle, near Restalrig, and others of the name had been Provost of Leith. In 1430, an ancestor, also called Sir Robert Logan (d. 1439), and his wife Dame Katherine founded the monastery of St Anthony which was near South Leith Parish Church with an outlying chapel at Arthur's Seat in Holyrood Park, which survives as a ruin.

Robert inherited Fast Castle and other lands near the border with England, as "nephew" and heir of Elizabeth Martene, Lady Fastcastle, widow of Cuthbert Home who had fallen at Flodden Field. In the 1570s, Robert was lord of half of the lands of Fastcastle, and Sir George Ogilvie of Dunlugus was lord of the other half.

In 1597, he surrendered a number of lands and rights connected to Fast Castle (but not the castle itself), which he had inherited from George Ogilvy of Dunlugus, to the Hume of Wedderburn family. The rights included the keeping of Berwick Castle, which had not been in Scottish hands since 1482. Fast Castle had been a possession of Coldingham Priory, but after 1598, the lands of the priory were annexed to the crown and so Logan now held Fastcastle and Flemington directly from the crown. On 5 April 1603, James VI of Scotland raised the status of the Restalrig estate into a free barony, which gave Robert extra jurisdictions over his tenants.

== Loyalties and exiled Queen ==
During the Marian Civil War in 1573, Logan supported Mary, Queen of Scots, by joining William Kirkcaldy of Grange in defending Edinburgh Castle in the Queen's name. On 29 July 1586, he wrote from Restalrig to Archibald Douglas in London to offer his service to Francis Walsingham. Logan conveyed letters secretly from England for the Master of Gray.

James VI had hoped that Archibald Douglas, a Scotsman resident in London but not an accredited ambassador, might be able to intervene to save his mother from execution after the revelation of the Babington Plot in 1586. The Master of Gray and Logan corresponded with Douglas on the unofficial diplomacy. The Master of Gray's letters show that he was reluctant to become involved in a project with such doubtful outcomes, but he sent Logan to Douglas in December 1586. After he returned to Fast Castle, Logan wrote back to Douglas on 25 February 1587. Mary had now been executed, and James VI was angry with Gray's actions, and Logan told Douglas not to write to Gray anymore:

"he wryt to me, desirenge me to wryt to your Lordship that ye shuld wryt no moir to hem, for your letters doithe hem very muche harme, and he was no thenge the wisar of your intelligens. It is indeid of treuthe that the Kinge is in greit anger at you and altogither be Williame Keithe and James Hetson's informatioune, and thinks ye have done hem wronge... His Majesty taks the daithe of his mother very hevely, and hes, for that cause, retirit hemself to Dalkethe for the space of 10 days in quyet".

Modernised: "he wrote to me, desiring me to write to your lordship that you should write no more to him, for your letters do him very much harm, and he was nothing the wiser from your intelligence. It is indeed of truth that the King is in great anger at you, and altogether by William Keith and James Hudson's information, and thinks you have done him wrong.... His Majesty takes the death of his mother very heavily, and has for that cause, retired himself to Dalkeith Palace for the space of 10 days in quiet".

In May 1590, one of his daughters was baptised at Fast Castle, and the Earl of Bothwell and Lord Home attended.

Logan died before May 1608, the last of his line, with adult and minor children, but none was allowed to inherit his lands. His minor children were later allowed to own land but not that of their father.

== Gowrie House affair ==
Logan was implicated in an alleged attempt to abduct James VI of Scotland by John Ruthven, 3rd Earl of Gowrie in Perth on 4 August 1600 by the confession of George Sprot of Eyemouth. In 1608, after Logan's death, Sprot confessed to having seen letters from Gowrie to Logan at Fast Castle and Gunnisgreen. Sprot understood from Logan's servant that if the king was successfully abducted, Logan would be rewarded with the gift of Dirleton Castle.

Sprot described a letter, signed "Restalrig", which he claimed was written by Robert Logan to Gowrie and to have had obtained from Logan's illiterate servant, James Bour of Auchencrow. Logan offered Gowrie and his brother the use of Fast Castle to settle their plot. He recommended for "the matter" to be settled soon at the King's buck hunting. In the letter, Robert said the matter in hand was like a strange tale of a gentleman of Padua.

George Sprot was hanged at the Market Cross of Edinburgh for foreknowledge of the conspiracy on 12 August 1608. The story was doubted at the time, Sprot having first withdrawn his confession. John Spottiswoode who was present at Sprot's hanging thought the tale "a meer invention of the man's own brain." Spottiswoode did not think that it was likely that Gowrie would have plotted with Logan.

Sprot had been connected with Logan, if only because the lawyer had signed as a witness to some of Logan's property transactions.

In 1609, the lands and the properties of the Logan family were forfeited by the Parliament of Scotland, including Logan of Restalrig's eldest son, also called Robert. The records of Parliament include the text of five alleged letters from Robert Logan to the Earl of Gowrie. In 1609 the King's advocate Thomas Hamilton wrote that credible witnesses including kirk ministers and others recognised Logan's handwriting in the "treasonable missives". Alexander Watson, minister of Coldingham testified that the spelling and the hand of the letters was that of Logan. Watson made detailed comment on the habits of Logan's orthography.
