= Corbeyran de Cardaillac-Sarlabous =

16th-century French soldier

Corbeyran de Cardaillac de Sarlabous was a 16th-century French soldier who served in Scotland as Captain of Dunbar Castle and was Governor of Le Havre for twenty years. He was usually called Captain Sarlabous in the letters of his time, written in both Scottish and English. A contemporary French writer calls him "sieur de Sarlaboz." Sarlabous is a place in the Hautes-Pyrénées where Corbeyran held lands.

Born around 1515 in Gascony, his father was Odet de Cardaillac, seigneur de Sarlabous, and his mother was Jeanne de Binos, heiress of Bize or Vize.

== In Scotland ==
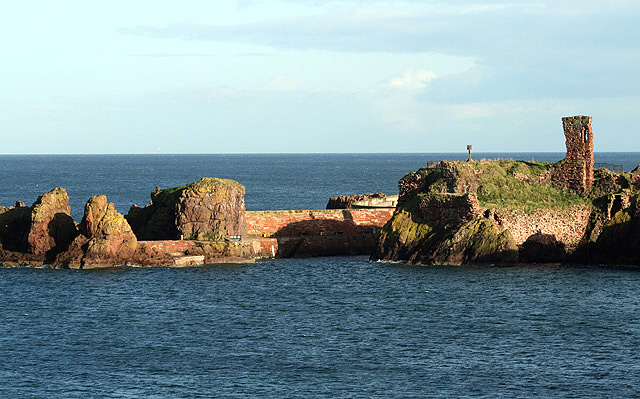
The French garrison of Dunbar Castle guarded a strategic port

Captain Sarlabous arrived in Scotland in 1549 under Paul de Thermes to resist the English in the war of the Rough Wooing. He was posted first at Dumbarton Castle, then made Captain of Dunbar in 1553. Henri Cleutin wrote to Mary of Guise, stating that he did not know Sarlabous personally, but the appointment was made at the recommendation of the Duke of Guise. In August 1554, Sarlabous joined the Earl of Argyll at Dunstaffnage Castle in an unsuccessful expedition to Mull against James McConill, McClane, and their whole "folkis".

On his return to France in 1558, he served the Duke of Guise at the siege of Thionville. He returned to Scotland to resist the Scottish Reformation. John Knox and the Protestant Lords of the Congregation sent letters from Perth to "Serra La Burse" and other French soldiers on 22 May 1559, asking them to desist from attacking "us natural Scottishmen." Sarlabous and Henri Cleutin were confronted by a Protestant force of 3,000 at Cupar Muir in June, and on Christmas Day 1559, they took part in the recapture of Stirling Castle from the Lords of the Congregation.

After Cleutin moved to Linlithgow, a spy for England reported that Sarlabous had 1,200 troops at Stirling under 5 'ensigns.' They marched into Fife and met with 400 more troops on 7 January 1560, who had sailed from Leith. According to Cleutin, they were attacked by 1,500 Protestants. A French cavalry charge won the day, and between 400 and 500 were killed. The young Earl of Arran reported this battle at Kinghorn differently as a skirmish, although the Earl of Sutherland was shot in the arm. John Knox adds that the French landing was at Pettycur Bay, and the Protestants were surprised by the arrival of the second French force from Stirling. Knox wrote that there were few casualties as Lord Ruthven arrived with cavalry. A Protestant Dutchman and a French boy were captured and hanged from Kinghorn steeple.

Sarlabous and his soldiers were attacked again on 30 January. Sarlabous was once again Captain of Dunbar, but joined in the defence of Leith. His soldiers included an English exile, Hector Wentworth. Mary of Guise sent him money for two weeks' wages for workmen at Dunar Castle in April 1560. A Captain "Charlebois the younger" was killed at the siege of Leith in April. On 8 May, Corbeyran got a messenger from the Lords of the Congregation to carry a message in code from Leith back to a lady-in-waiting of Mary of Guise. At Dunbar on 5 June, he welcomed back Captain Vigneau, who had brought letters from France.

As part of the peace settlement of the Treaty of Edinburgh, Sarlabous was appointed to remain at Dunbar with a reduced garrison of 60 men, while new additions to the fortifications there were to be dismantled or slighted. The townspeople of Dunbar reported to the Scottish council that Sarlabous hindered the work and had refurbished a cave used for storage within the area scheduled for demolition. Sarlabous was also seen at night on 17 August 1560 with four companions close to Berwick upon Tweed, a fortress town on the border held by the English. The commander Francis Leek heard that he had obtained a plan of the town.

Sarlebous offered a refuge to the fugitive Lord Semple within the castle, who had declared himself a servant of France and as such not a rebel to Scotland. Meanwhile, Castle Semple was besieged by the Earl of Arran. Sarlabous told the Scottish Captain Forbes, who came for Semple, that he doubted Elizabeth I would marry Arran. The Scottish Reformation Parliament had supported this marriage plan. He thought she would marry the King of Sweden, and Arran would be allowed to marry Lady Catherine, daughter of the Duchess of Suffolk. Sarlabous laid a bet with Forbes of a horse worth 100 crowns that this rumour was true. The diplomat Thomas Randolph thought the story most unlikely, but he decided not to repeat it in Scotland and got Forbes to promise to hold his tongue.

Mary, Queen of Scots, made Robert Anstruther captain of Dunbar in July 1561. When she arrived in Scotland, she found the "sieur de Sarlaboz" out of pocket for the expenses of the garrison, and on 11 September 1561 she wrote to Charles IX of France asking for him to be paid. Some of the money was still outstanding in 1567. He returned to France at the end of September 1561.

== Le Havre ==
Already a gentleman of the King's chamber and a knight of the royal order, Sarlabous was made Governor of the Port of Le Havre. There, he fought the Huguenots in the French Wars of Religion, who were aided by a force sent by Elizabeth I of England in 1563, commanded by the Earl of Warwick.

After the death of Henry Stewart, Lord Darnley, in February 1567, the Scottish spy Ninian Cockburn noted that Sarlabous was receiving more frequent communications from Scottish Catholics.

Although some historians have suggested that Sarlabous was directly involved in the assassination of Gaspard de Coligny, Edward Forestié points out that he was in Le Havre in August 1572. He remained Governor of Le Havre until 1584. He died in 1585, and his heart was buried in the Convent of the Minimes in Tournai, which his ancestor had founded.

== Family ==
Sarlabous had a son with Elizabeth Anderson, Jean, who was born in 1561 and declared legitimate by the King of France when he was sixteen years old. The biographer Edward Forestié suggested that Elizabeth Anderson was a lady in waiting to Mary of Guise. He thought her surname may have been 'Henderson,' and she may have been a connection of the herald William Henderson, Dingwall Pursuivant. Equally, Elizabeth could have been a relative of the gunner and carpenter Henry Anderson, both of whom would have frequently been at the castle.
