= John Willock =

Scottish church leader (1515–1585)

Personal details
- Born: 1515
- Died: 4 December 1585 (aged 69–70) rectory of Loughborough
- Denomination: Christian
- Education: University of Glasgow

John Willock (or Willocks or Willox) (c. 1515 – 4 December 1585) was a Scottish reformer. He appears to have been a friar of the Franciscan House at Ayr. Having joined the party of reform before 1541, he fled for his life to England. There he became noted as a zealous and taking preacher. This led to his arrest for heresy under an Act of Henry VIII., "for abolishing diversity of opinion" in matters of religion. He was found guilty of preaching against purgatory, holy water, priestly confession, and prayer to the saints, and of holding that priests might lawfully be married, he was for some time confined in the Fleet prison. After the accession of Edward VI he was chaplain to Henry, Duke of Suffolk, who had married King Henry's niece, and is best known as the father of Lady Jane Grey. He preached for a time in London, in St Katherine's Church, when both he and John Knox, his fast friend, were granted general license to preach anywhere in England. Henry, Earl of Huntingdon, presented him to the rectory of Loughborough in Leicestershire, a living which he continued to hold during King Edward's reign, and again during that of Queen Elizabeth for the rest of his life. Thus in his later years he was in the unique position of being at the same time a parish minister in both England and Scotland. When Mary Tudor came to the English throne in 1553, Willock fled to Embden, in the Protestant Duchy of Friesland. There he practised as a physician with much success, and rose to some eminence. In 1555, and again in 1556, the Duchess Anne of Friesland sent him to Scotland as her Commissioner on matters of trade. In 1558 he returned home, and preached for some time in Dundee, with much acceptance among the friends of reform. In 1559, when John Knox had to leave Edinburgh in peril of his life, Willook took his place as the evangelist of the Reformation. It was then that he conducted in St Giles what is believed to have been the earliest public celebration of the Holy Communion in Scotland after the reformed ritual. In 1560, when Queen Mary of Guise lay dying, the Earls of Argyll and Moray, and other Lords of the Congregation advised her to "send for a godly, learned man of whom she might receive instruction"; and Willock was chosen to minister to her, which he faithfully did. That same year he was made Superintendent of Glasgow and the West. He was also one of the six Johns entrusted with the drawing up of the First Book of Discipline, the others being John Knox, John Winram, John Spottiswood, John Douglas, and John Row. Sometime in that year he went to England, and brought home his wife, Katherine Picknavell, an English lady. He was chosen Moderator of the General Assembly in 1563, 1564, 1565, and 1568. In 1565 Queen Mary endeavoured to put a stop to his activity by having him imprisoned in Dumbarton Castle; but the Reformers were now too strong for her, and she had to depart from her purpose.

After that, Willock went back to his English rectory at Loughborough. In 1567 the General Assembly sent him a strong letter of appeal, begging him to come again to aid the good cause. This led to his return, and he was Moderator of Assembly in 1568. He went again to Loughborough, and was there in 1570 when the Regent Moray was assassinated. Knox then wished much to have the aid of his old friend in the perplexities of the time, but Willock could not come. His letter to Knox tells of his sorrow at the loss of the good regent, and of his great admiration for that departed statesman.

== Early life ==
He was a native of Ayrshire, but nothing is known of his parentage. He was educated at the University of Glasgow.

For some time he was a friar in Ayr, according to Archbishop Spottiswoode of the Franciscan, but according to Bishop Lesley of the Dominican Order. He then embraced the reformed religion and went to London, where, about 1542, he became preacher at St. Catherine's Church and chaplain to Henry Grey, afterwards Duke of Suffolk, the father of Lady Jane Grey.

== East Frisia ==
On the accession of Mary to the English throne in 1553 he went to Emden in East Frisia, where he practised as a physician. In 1555, and again in 1556, he was sent to Scotland on a commission to Mary of Guise, the Queen Regent, from Anna of Oldenburg, the Countess and Regent of East Frisia; but according to Knox his principal purpose in visiting Scotland was "to assaye what God wald wirk to him in his native country. While there he was present at the supper in the house of John Erskine of Dun, when a final resolution was come to by the leading reformers against attendance at the mass. He returned to East Frisia in 1557

== During the Scots Reformation ==
He finally settled in Scotland in 1558, when, although "he contracted a dangerous sickness," he held meetings with several of the nobility, barons, and gentlemen, "teaching and exhorting from his bed"; and, according to Knox, it was the encouragement and exhortations of Willock in Dundee and Edinburgh that made "the brethren" begin "to deliberate on some public reformation," and resolve to send to the queen regent an "oration and petition" on the subject.

Afterwards Willock went to Ayr, where, under the protection of the Earl of Glencairn, he preached regularly in St. John's Church. On 2 February 1559 he was indicted for heresy before the queen regent and her council, and for failing to appear and continuing to preach at Ayr he was outlawed on 10 May following. In March 1559 a disputation was proposed between him and Quintin Kennedy, abbot of Crossraguel Abbey, at Ayr, but as they failed to agree on the method of interpreting scripture it did not take place (see correspondence between them in, and in. The sentence of outlawry of him and others was passed, notwithstanding the assembly of a large body of armed reformers at Perth, to whom a promise had been made that Willock and his friends would not be further molested; but the outlawry could not be rendered effective. Willock had come to Perth in company with the Earl of Glencairn, and while there he and Knox had an interview with the Earl of Argyll and Lord James Stewart (afterwards Earl of Moray), from whom they received an assurance that should the queen regent depart from her agreement they would "with their whole powers" assist and concur "with their brethren in all time to come". After the destruction of the monasteries at Perth, which followed the breach of agreement by the queen regent, Willock and Knox towards the close of June 1559 entered Edinburgh along with the Lords of the Congregation. Shortly afterwards Knox was elected minister of St Giles' Cathedral, Edinburgh; but after a truce had been completed with the queen regent it was deemed advisable that Knox should for a while retire from Edinburgh, Willock acting as his substitute in St. Giles. During Knox's absence strenuous efforts were made by the queen regent to have the old form of worship re-established, but Willock firmly resisted her attempts; and in August he administered the Lord's supper for the first time in Edinburgh after the reformed manner.

After the queen regent had broken the treaty and begun to fortify Leith a convention of the nobility, barons, and burghers was on 21 October held in the Tolbooth to take into consideration her conduct, and Willock, on being asked his judgment, gave it as his opinion that she "might justly be deprived of the government," in which, with certain provisos, he was seconded by Knox. The result was that her authority was suspended, and a council appointed to manage the affairs of the kingdom until a meeting of parliament, Willock being one of the four ministers chosen to assist in the deliberations of the council.

== After the Scots Reformation ==
Not long afterwards Willock left for England and a meeting with John Craig in London has been suggested as Craig escaped from the continent to avoid the reaches of Pius IV. Willock returned to Scotland in 1560, and, at the request of the reformed nobility, attended Mary of Guise the queen regent on her deathbed in June following, when, according to Knox, he did plainly show her as well the virtue and strength of the death of Jesus Christ as the vanity and abomination of that idol the mass. By the committee of parliament he was in July 1560 named Superintendent of the West, to which he was admitted at Glasgow in July 1561. He was also in July 1560 named one of a commission appointed by the Lords of the Congregation to draw up the First Book of Discipline.

== Life in England ==
As a Scottish reformer Willock stands next to Knox in initiative and in influence; but it is possible that the rigid severity of Knox became distasteful to him, and, apparently deeming the religious atmosphere of England more congenial, he about 1562—in which year he was, however, in June and December Moderator of the General Assembly—became rector of All Saints Church, Loughborough in Leicestershire, to which he was presented by Henry Hastings, 3rd Earl of Huntingdon. Nevertheless, by continuing for several years to hold the office of Superintendent of the West, he retained his connection with the Scottish church, and he was elected Moderator of the General Assembly on 25 June 1564, 25 June 1565, and 1 July 1568.

While he was in Scotland in 1565 the queen made endeavours to have him sent to the castle of Dumbarton, but he made his escape. In January 1568 the General Assembly of the Kirk sent him through Knox a letter praying him to return to his old charge in Scotland; but although he did visit Scotland and officiated as Moderator of the Assembly, he again returned to his charge in England. According to Sir James Melville, the Earl of Morton made use of Willock to reveal to Elizabeth, through the Earls of Huntingdon and Leicester, the dealings of the Duke of Norfolk with the Regent Moray, for an arrangement by which the Duke would marry the Queen of Scots.

He travelled to Scotland in May 1568, and wrote that people of the north of England, who were "mere ignorant of religion and altogether untaught" were pleased at the news that Mary, Queen of Scots had escaped from Lochleven Castle.

== Death and namesake ==
Willock died in his rectory at Loughborough on 4 December 1585, and was buried the next day, being Sunday; his wife Catherine survived him fourteen years, and was buried at Loughborough on 10 Oct 1599 (Fletcher, Parish Registers of Loughborough). Though Thomas Dempster ascribed to him Impia quædam, it does not appear that he left any works. George Chalmers, in his "Life of Ruddiman,' seeks to identify Willock with one "John Willokis, descended of Scottish progenitors," who on 27 April 1590 is referred to in a state paper as being in prison in Leicester, after having been convicted by a jury of robbery. The supposition of Chalmers, sufficiently improbable in itself, is of course disposed of by the entry of the rector's death in the parish register, but there is just a possibility that the robber may have been the rector's son.

== Family ==
Willock's wife survived until 1599. His last will makes provision for his son Edmund, and Edmund's wife Grizel, also for their children John, Katherine, Mary, Bridget, Dorothy, and George.
