= Articles of Leith =

1559 truce between Scotland and the Protestant Lords of the Congregation

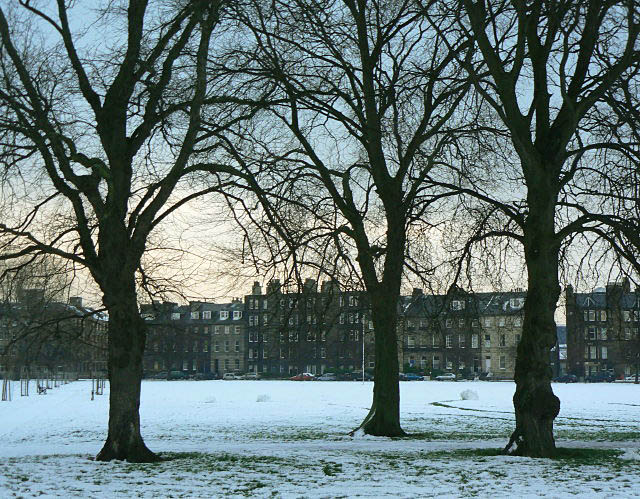
Leith Links, where the Lords of the Congregation debated a treaty on 24 July 1559

The Articles of Leith were the terms of truce drawn up between the Protestant Lords of the Congregation and Mary of Guise, Regent of Scotland and signed on 25 July 1559. This negotiation was a step in the conflict that led to the Scottish Reformation. Although its immediate effect was the withdrawal of Protestant forces from Edinburgh, subsequent disputes over the content and observance of the treaty fuelled the crisis in Scotland.

== The Reformation crisis ==
Following religious riots which began at Perth, the Protestant Lords had taken up arms against Mary of Guise and the French troops that supported her rule in Scotland. The Lords occupied Edinburgh in June 1559, taking Holyroodhouse and seizing the coining equipment from the Scottish Mint. News came that Henry II of France had died, which cheered John Knox who supposed this might halt further French intervention. However, a Catholic army approached from Dunbar, and the Captain of Edinburgh Castle, Lord Erskine, declared for the Queen Regent. The French troops moved into Leith, which surrendered without resistance, in part due to the persuasion of Robert Logan of Restalrig. The Lords of the Congregation marshalled themselves at Craigengalt. Under these circumstances, they were compelled to seek terms and withdraw from Edinburgh, rather than fight a battle they could not win. The resultant articles of truce were drafted at Leith Links on 24 July 1559.

The next day the Earls of Argyll and Glencairn, Lord James and other Lords of the Congregation met Guise's supporters, the Duke of Châtellerault and Earl of Huntly at the 'Quarrel Holes' between Edinburgh and Leith, and they promised to withdraw their support for Guise if she broke any point of the articles. The articles were subscribed by the Lords on 25 July 1559 and included important concessions to their religion. Henri Cleutin, the Earl of Huntly and the Duke of Châtellerault signed on behalf of Mary of Guise. William Kirkcaldy of Grange sent news of the agreement to James Croft at Berwick-upon-Tweed.

== Articles of the appointment ==
A copy of the articles written in French as agreed with Mary of Guise on 23 July 1559 survived. She promised a review of the religious settlement and church property in the Parliament of Scotland on 10 January 1560. In summary:

1. The Lords will depart from Edinburgh as the Queen Regent pleases.
2. The Lords will return the coining-irons seized from the mint (to Master Robert Richardson), and render Holyrood Palace to its 'concierge,' (Master James Balfour), leaving Lord Ruthven and John Wishart of Pitarrow as hostages.
3. The Lords will give all due obedience to Mary, Queen of Scots, Francis II of France and the Queen Regent, and the law, as before, except in the matter of religion.
4. The Lords will not molest churchmen, or their property and appointments.
5. The Lords will use no force against churches or monasteries.
6. Edinburgh shall choose and use its own form of religion, the inhabitants shall follow their conscience till 10 January.
7. The Queen Regent shall not molest Protestant preachers or their possessions. Each should live in private according to his conscience.

== Aftermath ==
Although the Lords of the Congregation withdrew from Edinburgh to Stirling after the conclusion of the 'Leith Agreement,' it did not lead to six months of relative tranquillity until a parliament in January 1560. Instead, numbers of French troops arrived in support of the Regent. The Lords claimed that this was in contravention of an article of the Leith agreement that proscribed garrisons of soldiers in Edinburgh. However, French copies of the articles lack this specific item. As early as 28 August 1559, Guise made a public proclamation that she had not violated the truce and rumours that she had breached the appointment were the work of the Congregation. In respect of the sixth article of the agreement, the Duke, Huntly, and the Provost of Edinburgh, Lord Seton, could not persuade the town to allow the Catholic Mass in St Giles.

The congregation continued to gain support; Châtellerault changed sides after his son, the Earl of Arran was smuggled home from France by English agents. Sir James Croft had told Scottish agents when the Leith agreement was made that Elizabeth I of England could not deal with a 'confused multitude' and Arran's presence was required to lay a foundation. With the former Regent as its figurehead the Congregation was able to broker English military support by the Treaty of Berwick. After the death of Mary of Guise, and the conclusion of the Siege of Leith, Scotland became a Protestant country with a Catholic monarch.
