= Cupar Muir =

Coordinates: 56°18′26.64″N 3°2′8.19″W

- Hamlet
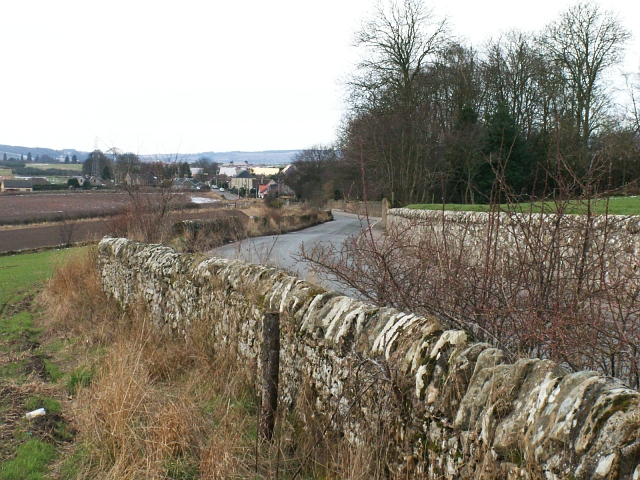
- Cupar Muir seen from Cupar

- Location within Fife
- Population: 229
- OS grid reference: NO36021326
- Civil parish: Cupar
- Council area: Fife
- Lieutenancy area: Fife
- Country: Scotland
- Sovereign state: United Kingdom
- Post town: CUPAR
- Postcode district: KY15
- Dialling code: 01334
- Police: Scotland
- Fire: Scottish
- Ambulance: Scottish
- UK Parliament: North East Fife
- Scottish Parliament: North East Fife

Cupar Muir or Cuparmuir is a hamlet or small village situated just outside the town of Cupar, Fife. Lying around 25.5 miles (41 km) north of Edinburgh, it had a population of around 229 in 2011.

The settlement was primarily developed around quarrying of stone, but is better known for a 1559 confrontation between the French troops of Mary of Guise and the Protestant forces of the Lords of the Congregation.

== History ==
On some early maps, Cupar Muir can be found labelled as Brighton after the Brighton Brick and Tile works which were once a prominent feature found to the south of the hamlet. These were opened in 1837 by Archibald Mitchell, so named after John Bright with whom Mitchell shared his politics, and he was joined soon after by his business partner Henry Duncan. The works were at one point considered extensive, and employed around 30 people in the mid-1850s. By 1909, the works had been closed for "some time," and in 1936 the associated Fife Brick and Tile Company was dissolved. On the site of the Brighton Brick and Tile works, occasionally referred to as the Trafford Bank Brickworks, now stands a small industrial estate.

=== Scottish Reformation ===
John Knox and Robert Lindsay of Pitscottie described a confrontation during the Scottish Reformation at Cupar Muir on 13 June 1559. The Protestant Lords of the Congregation opposed the French troops of Mary of Guise commanded by Henri Cleutin and a Scottish force led by James Hamilton, Duke of Châtellerault. Following the Reformation riots at Perth, the French troops were marching towards St. Andrews from Falkland. On 13 June a Protestant force of 3,000 assembled at Cupar Muir to prevent the French reaching Cupar.

The Protestants were led by the half-brother of Mary, Queen of Scots, Lord James, Lord Ruthven, the Earl of Rothes, the Lothian lairds of Ormiston, Calder, Haltoun, Restalrig, and Colstoun, with men from Dundee, St. Andrews and Cupar. Knox wrote it seemed as if "men had rained from the clouds." Master James Halyburton, Provost of Dundee, chose their position on the Muir to give the best advantage with their guns.

The French advanced within a mile, keeping the River Eden between them and the Protestant force. Cleutin and the Duke rode to Hill of Tarvit. John, Lord Lindsay, (or Patrick, Master of Lindsay), and Patrick Hepburn of Wauchton came from the Duke or the Regent to treat with the Protestants. A truce of eight days was made and signed by Lord James and Cleutin at "Garlabank", now Garlie Bank, on the flank of the hill by the river. Robert Lindsay supplies dialogue for the negotiation, giving Lord Lindsay a lengthy and persuasive speech to the French commanders Cleutin, De la Chapel, and Sarlabous that brokered the peace;

"Ye are strangers, lose not the hearts of Scottish-men, neither procure the nobility of Scotland to turn enemies to the King of France, who are now his friends, ... Likewise it is an old Scottish proverb; I will suffer my friend to need, but I cannot see him bleed."

The negotiation of a truce at Cupar Muir is regarded as a major turning point in the crisis of the Scottish Reformation.
