= Scottish Reformation =

Movement that established the Church of Scotland

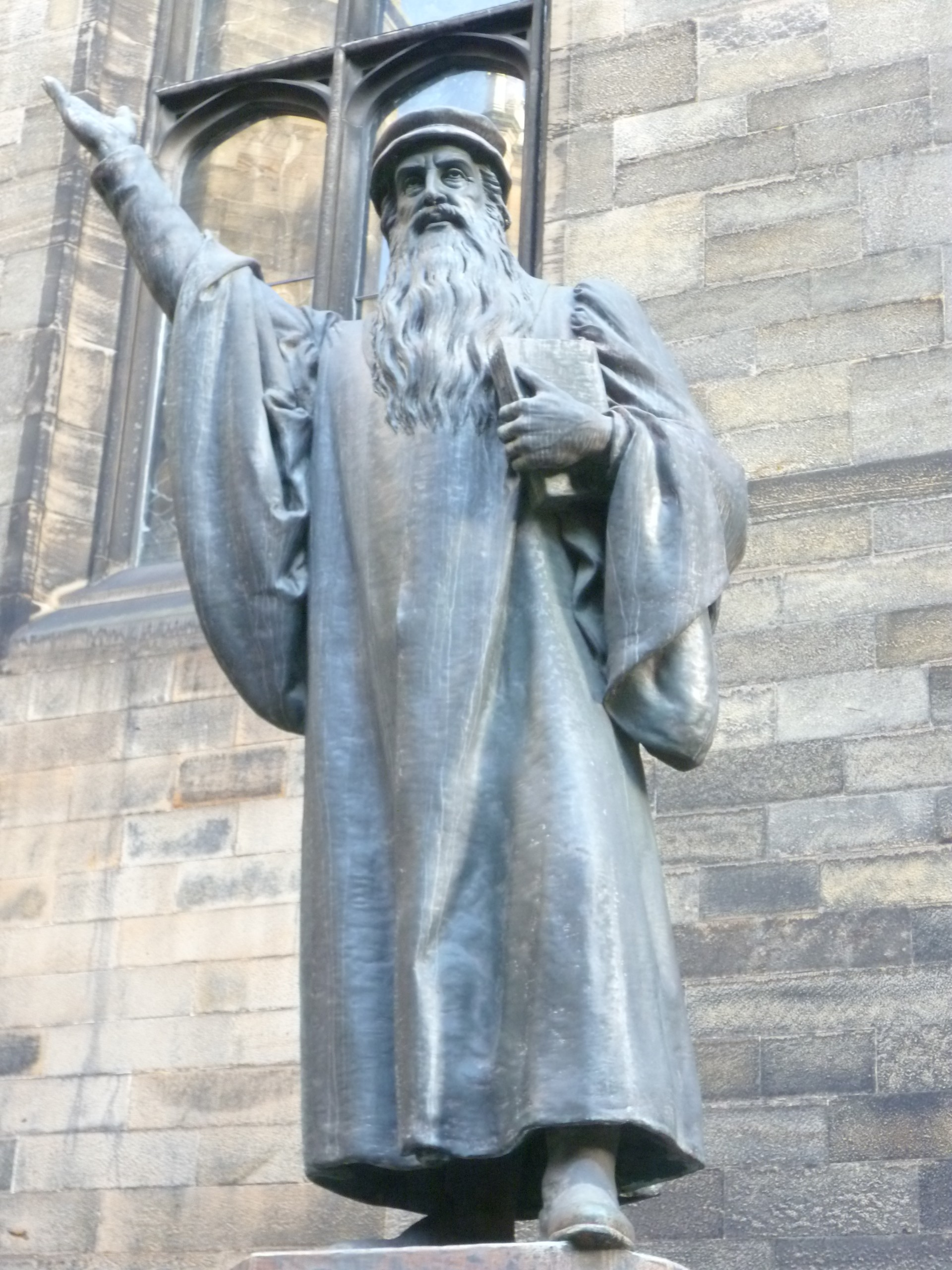
Statue of John Knox, a leading figure of the Scottish Reformation.

The Scottish Reformation was the process whereby Scotland broke away from the Catholic Church, and established the Protestant Church of Scotland. (Note: Popularly known as 'the Kirk') It forms part of the wider European 16th-century Protestant Reformation.

From the first half of the 16th century, Scottish scholars and religious leaders were influenced by the teachings of the Protestant reformer, Martin Luther. In 1560, a group of Scottish nobles known as the Lords of the Congregation gained control of government. Under their guidance, the Scottish Reformation Parliament passed legislation that established a Protestant creed, and rejected Papal supremacy, although these were only formally ratified by James VI in 1567. The kirk itself became the subject of national pride, and many Scots saw their country as a new Israel.

Directed by John Knox, the new Church of Scotland adopted a Presbyterian structure and largely Calvinist doctrine. The Reformation resulted in major changes in Scottish education, art and religious practice.

== Pre-Reformation Scotland ==
=== Pre-Reformation church ===
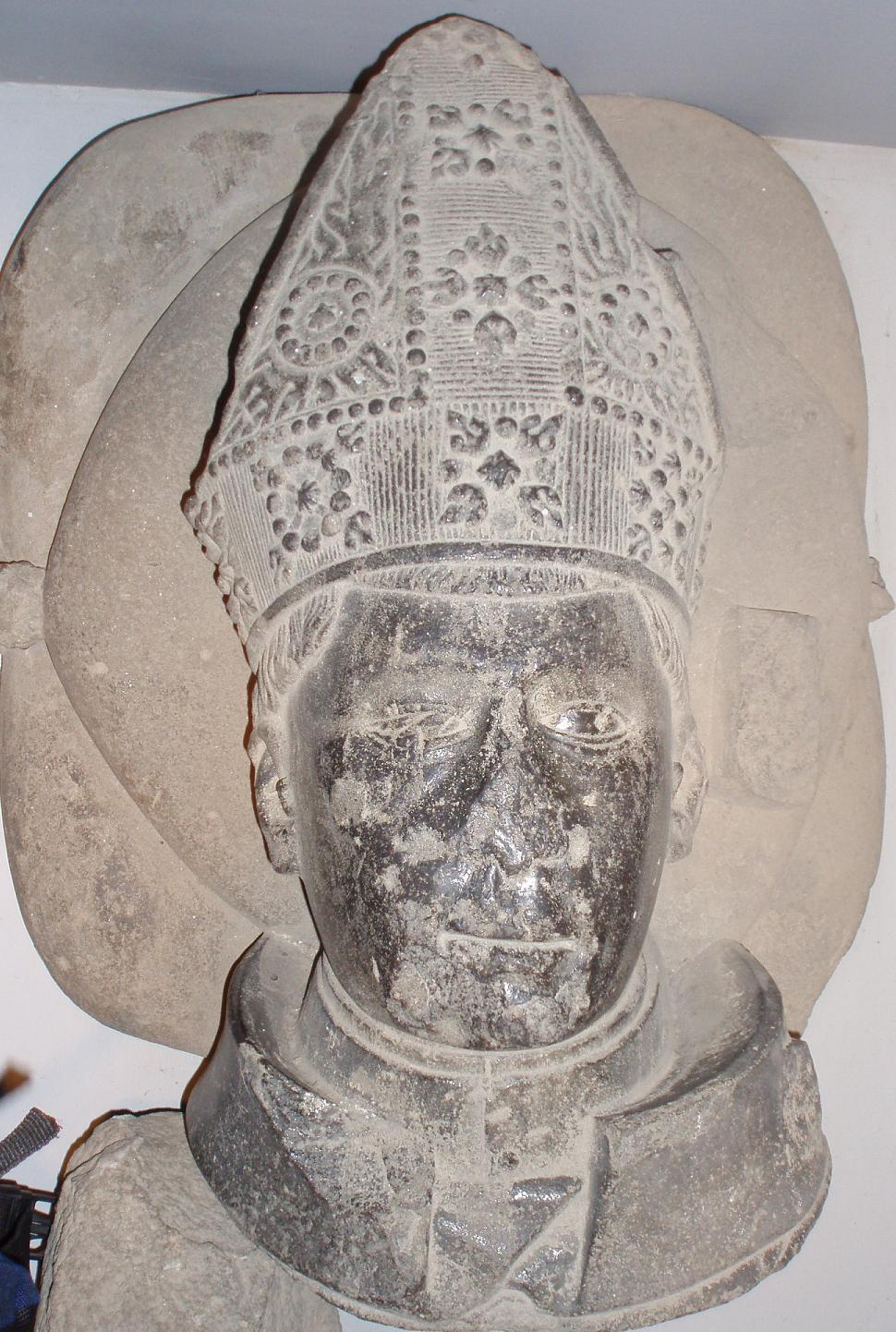
Henry Wardlaw (died 1440), Bishop of St Andrews, royal tutor and adviser, founder of The University of St Andrews and key figure in fighting Lollardy

==== Structure ====
Christianity spread in Scotland from the 6th century, with evangelisation by Irish-Scots missionaries and, to a lesser extent, those from Rome and England. The church in Scotland attained clear independence from England after the Papal Bull of Celestine III (Cum universi, 1192), by which all Scottish bishoprics except Galloway became formally independent of York and Canterbury. The whole Ecclesia Scoticana, with individual Scottish bishoprics (except Whithorn/Galloway), became the "special daughter of the see of Rome". It was run by special councils made up of all the Scottish bishops, with the bishop of St Andrews emerging as the most important figure. The administration of parishes was often given to local monastic institutions in a process known as appropriation. By the time of the Reformation in the mid-16th century 80% of Scottish parishes were appropriated, leaving few resources for the parish clergy.

In 1472 St Andrews became the first archbishopric in the Scottish church, to be followed by Glasgow in 1492. The collapse of papal authority in the Papal Schism (1378–1418) allowed the Scottish Crown to gain effective control of major ecclesiastical appointments within the kingdom. This de facto authority over appointments was formally recognised by the Papacy in 1487. The Crown placed clients and relatives of the king in key positions, including James IV's (r. 1488–1513) illegitimate son Alexander Stewart, who was nominated as Archbishop of St. Andrews at the age of 11. This practice strengthened royal influence but it also made the Church vulnerable to criticisms of venality and nepotism. Relationships between the Scottish Crown and the Papacy were generally good, with James IV receiving tokens of papal favour.

==== Medieval popular religion ====
Traditional Protestant historiography tended to stress the corruption and unpopularity of the late Medieval Scottish church. Since the late 20th century, research has indicated the ways in which it met the spiritual needs of different social groups. Historians have discerned a decline of monastic life in this period, with many religious houses maintaining smaller numbers of monks. Those remaining often abandoned communal living for a more individual and secular lifestyle. The rate of new monastic endowments from the nobility also declined in the 15th century. In contrast, the burghs saw the flourishing of mendicant orders of friars in the later 15th century, who, unlike the older monastic orders, placed an emphasis on preaching and ministering to the population. The order of Observant Friars were organised as a Scottish province from 1467, and the older Franciscans and the Dominicans were recognised as separate provinces in the 1480s.

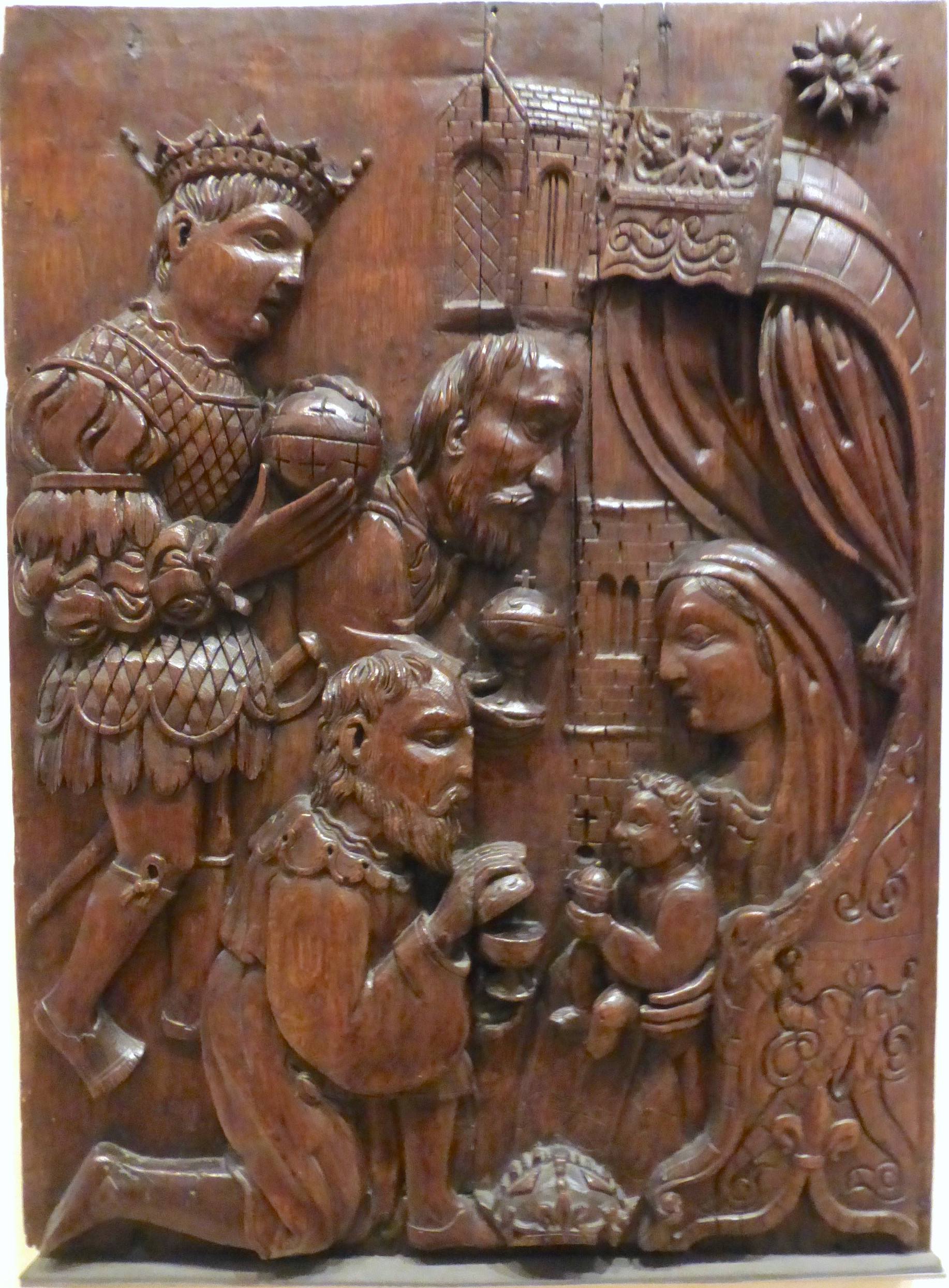
A mid-16th-century oak panel carving from a house in Dundee

In most Scottish burghs there was usually only one parish church, in contrast to English towns where churches and parishes tended to proliferate. As the doctrine of Purgatory gained importance in the late Middle Ages, the number of chapelries, priests, and masses for the dead prayed within them, designed to speed the passage of souls to Heaven, grew rapidly. The number of altars dedicated to saints, who could intercede in this process, also increased dramatically. St. Mary's in Dundee had perhaps 48 such altars and St Giles' in Edinburgh more than 50. The number of saints celebrated in Scotland also proliferated, with about 90 being added to the missal used in St Nicholas church in Aberdeen. New cults of devotion related to Jesus and the Virgin Mary began to reach Scotland in the 15th century, including the Five Wounds, the Holy Blood, and the Holy Name of Jesus. New religious feasts arose, including celebrations of the Presentation, the Visitation, and Mary of the Snows.

In the early 14th century, the Papacy managed to minimise the problem of clerical pluralism, by which clerics held two or more livings, which elsewhere resulted in parish churches being without priests, or served by poorly trained and paid vicars and clerks. The number of poor clerical livings and a general shortage of clergy in Scotland, particularly after the Black Death, meant that in the 15th century the problem intensified. As a result, parish clergy were largely drawn from the lower ranks of the profession, leading to frequent complaints about their standards of education or abilities. Although there is little clear evidence that standards were declining, this was expressed as one of the major grievances of the Reformation. Heresy, in the form of Lollardry, began to reach Scotland from England and Bohemia in the early 15th century. Lollards were followers of John Wycliffe (c. 1330 –84) and later Jan Hus (c. 1369 –1415), who called for reform of the Church and rejected its doctrine on the Eucharist. Despite evidence of the burning of heretics and some popular support for its anti-sacramental elements, it probably remained a small movement.

== Pressure to reform ==
=== Humanism ===
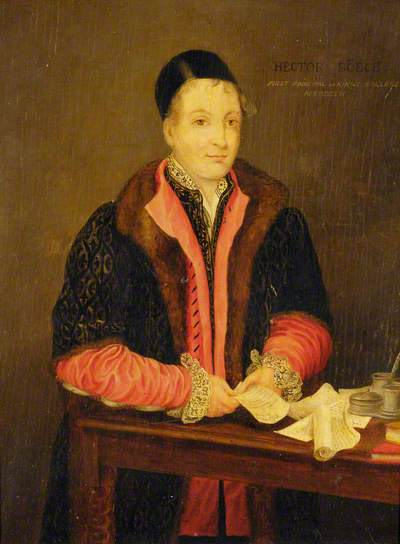
Portrait of Hector Boece (1465–1536), a major figure in European humanism, who returned to be the first principal of the University of Aberdeen

From the 15th century, Renaissance humanism encouraged critical theological reflection and calls for ecclesiastical renewal in Scotland. As early as 1495 some Scots were in contact with Desiderius Erasmus (1466–1536), the Netherlands-born leading figure in the northern humanist movement. They were also in contact with Jacques Lefèvre d'Étaples (c. 1455 – 1536), a French humanist and scholar who like Erasmus argued strongly for reform of the Catholic Church by the elimination of corruption and abuses. Scottish scholars often studied on the Continent and at English universities. Humanist scholars trained on the Continent were recruited to the new Scottish universities founded at St Andrews, Glasgow, and Aberdeen. These international contacts helped integrate Scotland into a wider European scholarly world and were one of the most important ways in which the new ideas of humanism entered Scottish intellectual life. By 1497 the humanist and historian Hector Boece, who was born in Dundee and studied at Paris, returned to become the first principal at the new university of Aberdeen.

The continued movement of scholars to other universities resulted in a school of Scottish nominalists at Paris by the early 16th century, the most important of whom was John Mair, generally described as a scholastic. His Latin History of Greater Britain (1521) was sympathetic to the humanist social agenda. In 1518 he returned to become Principal of the University of Glasgow. Another major figure was Archibald Whitelaw, who taught at St. Andrews and Cologne, becoming a tutor to the young James III and royal secretary in 1462–1493. Robert Reid, Abbot of Kinloss and later Bishop of Orkney, was responsible in the 1520s and 1530s for bringing the Italian humanist Giovanni Ferrario to teach at Kinloss Abbey. Ferrario established an impressive library and wrote works of Scottish history and biography. Reid was to leave sufficient endowment in his will, for the foundation of Edinburgh University. James McGoldrick suggests that there was a circle of "Erasmian-type scholar-reformers" at the royal court in the first decade of the sixteenth century.

=== Lutheranism ===
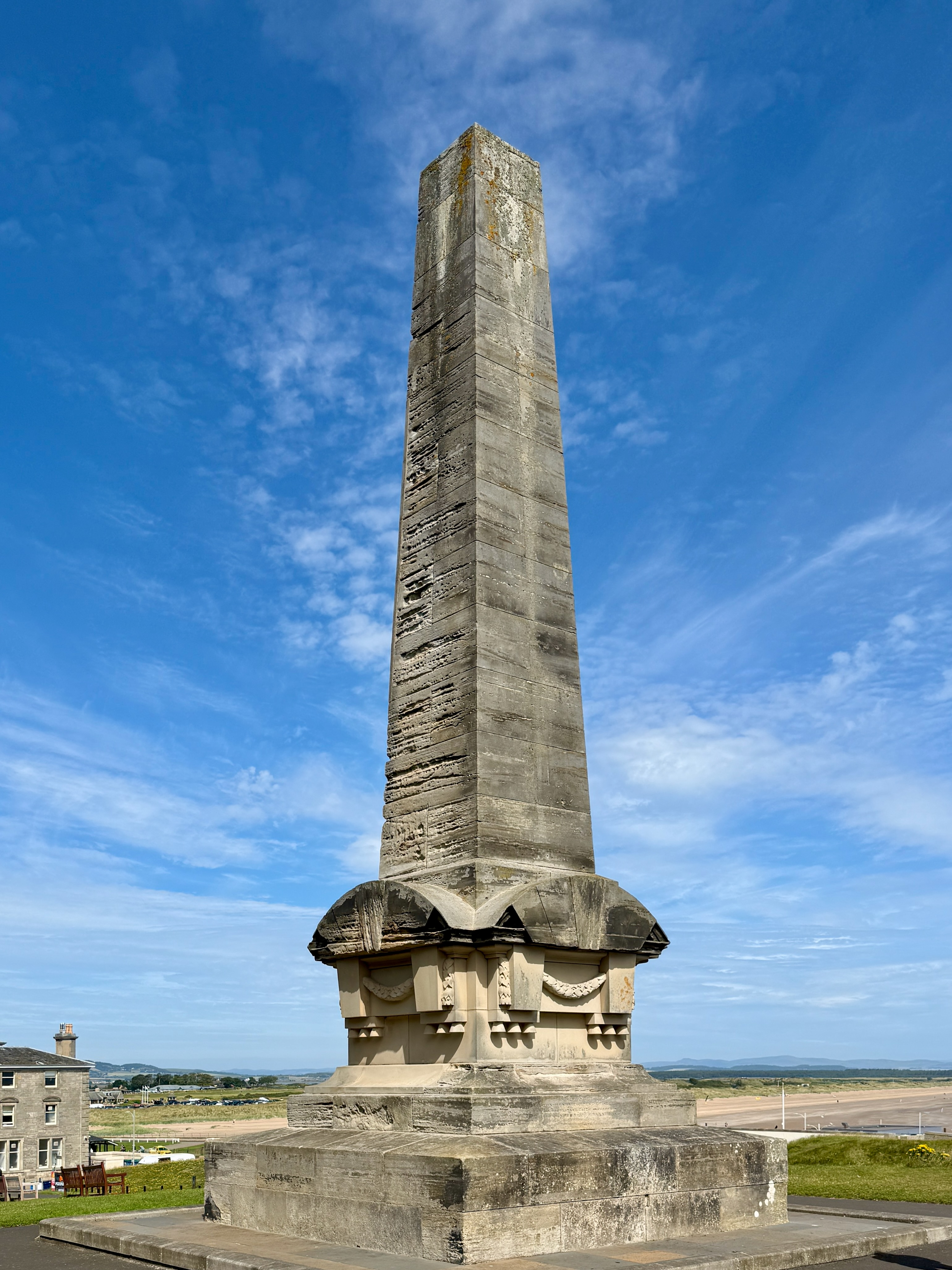
The Martyrs' Monument at Saint Andrews commemorates Protestants executed before the Reformation: Patrick Hamilton, Walter Milne, Henry Forrest and George Wishart.

From the 1520s the ideas of Martin Luther began to have influence in Scotland, with Lutheran literature circulating in the east-coast burghs. In 1525 Parliament banned their importation. In 1527, the English ambassador at Antwerp noted that Scottish merchants were taking William Tyndale's New Testament to Edinburgh and St. Andrews. In 1528 the nobleman Patrick Hamilton, who had been influenced by Lutheran theology while at the universities of Wittenberg and Marburg, became the first Protestant martyr in Scotland. He was burned at the stake for heresy outside St Salvator's College at Saint Andrews. Hamilton's execution inspired more interest in the new ideas. The Archbishop of St Andrews was warned against any further such public executions as "the reek [smoke] of Maister Patrik Hammyltoun has infected as many as it blew upon".

== Political background (1528–1559) ==
=== James V ===
After entering his personal reign in 1528, James V avoided pursuing the major structural and theological changes to the church undertaken by his contemporary Henry VIII in England. In exchange for his loyalty to Rome, he was able to appoint some of his illegitimate children and favourites to office in the Church, particularly his son James Stewart, 1st Earl of Moray who became a Prior in 1538 at the age of seven. James increased crown revenues by heavily taxing the church, taking £72,000 in four years. The results of such appointments and taxation undermined both the status and finances of the Church. The Church was also divided by jurisdictional disputes between Gavin Dunbar, Archbishop of Glasgow and James Beaton, Archbishop of St. Andrews until his death in 1539. As a result, in 1536 the first provincial church council called since 1470 failed to achieve major reforms or a united front against heresy. After the execution of Patrick Hamilton, the Crown prosecuted some men and a small number of executions followed in the 1530s and 1540s, but there was no systematic persecution, as the king was not interested in wide-scale bloodletting. An increasing number of lairds and nobles began to favour reform, particularly in Angus, the Mearns, Fife and within the University of St Andrews. Leading figures included Alexander Cunningham, 5th Earl of Glencairn and John Erskine of Dun. In 1541 Parliament passed legislation to protect the honour of the Mass, prayer to the Virgin Mary, images of the saints, and the authority of the pope.

=== Rough Wooing ===
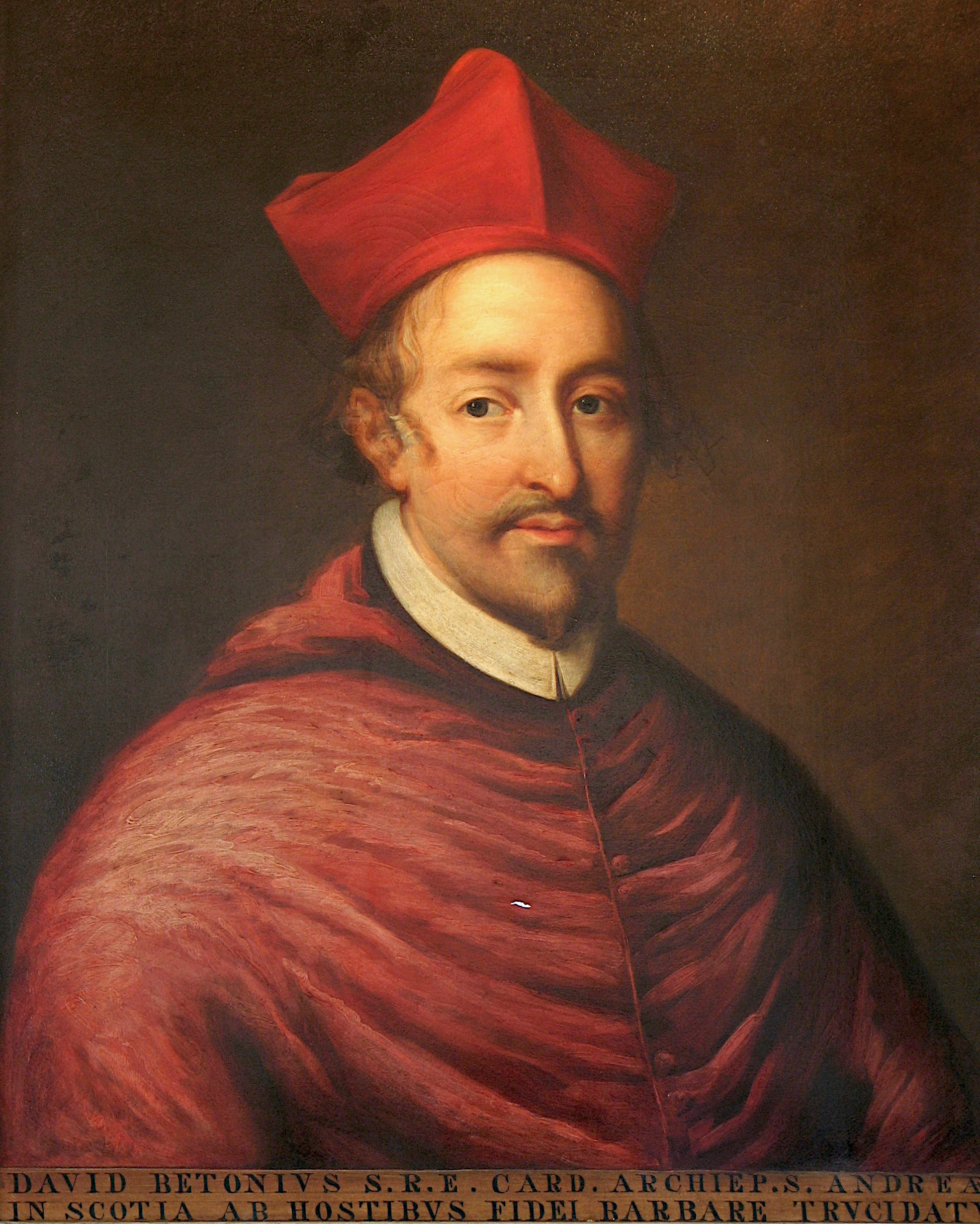
Cardinal Beaton, defender of the old faith, and leader of the pro-French faction.

James V died in 1542, leaving the infant Mary, Queen of Scots as his heir, with the prospect of a long minority. At the beginning of Mary's reign, the Scottish political nation was divided between a pro-French faction, led by Cardinal Beaton and by the Queen's mother, Mary of Guise, and a pro-English faction, headed by Mary's prospective heir James Hamilton, Earl of Arran. Initially Arran became Regent, backed by the small "evangelical party" at court, who favoured religious reform. The act of Parliament of 1543 removed the prohibition against reading the Bible in the vernacular. A planned marriage between Mary and Edward, the son of Henry VIII of England, which had been agreed under the Treaty of Greenwich (1543), led to a backlash in Scotland and a coup led by Cardinal Beaton. He repudiated the reforming policies, and all consideration of an English marriage for the Queen, angering the English. They invaded to enforce the match, an action later known as the "rough wooing", which devastated south-east Scotland.

In 1546, George Wishart, a preacher who had come under the influence of Swiss reformer Huldrych Zwingli, was arrested and burnt at the stake in St. Andrews on the orders of Cardinal Beaton. Wishart's supporters, who included a number of Fife lairds, assassinated Beaton soon after and seized St. Andrews Castle, which they held for a year while under siege, before they were defeated with the help of French forces. The survivors, including chaplain John Knox, were condemned to be galley slaves, helping to create resentment of the French and martyrs for the Protestant cause.

In 1547, the English under Edward Seymour, 1st Duke of Somerset renewed their invasion and defeated the Scots at Pinkie, occupied south-east Scotland with forts at Lauder, Haddington and an outpost at Dundee. This occupation (1547–1549) encouraged the reforming cause. The English supplied books and distributed Bibles and Protestant literature in the Lowlands. Several earls pledged themselves 'to cause the word of God to be taught and preached'. To counter the English, the Scots secured French help, the price of which was the betrothal of the infant Queen to the French dauphin, the future Francis II. She departed for France in 1548, where she was to be raised and educated. At this point, "the policy of Henry VIII had failed completely". French ascendancy was made absolute over the next decade. In 1554, Arran was given the title Duke du Châtellerault and removed from the regency in favour of Mary of Guise (the Queen Mother).

=== Regency of Mary of Guise ===
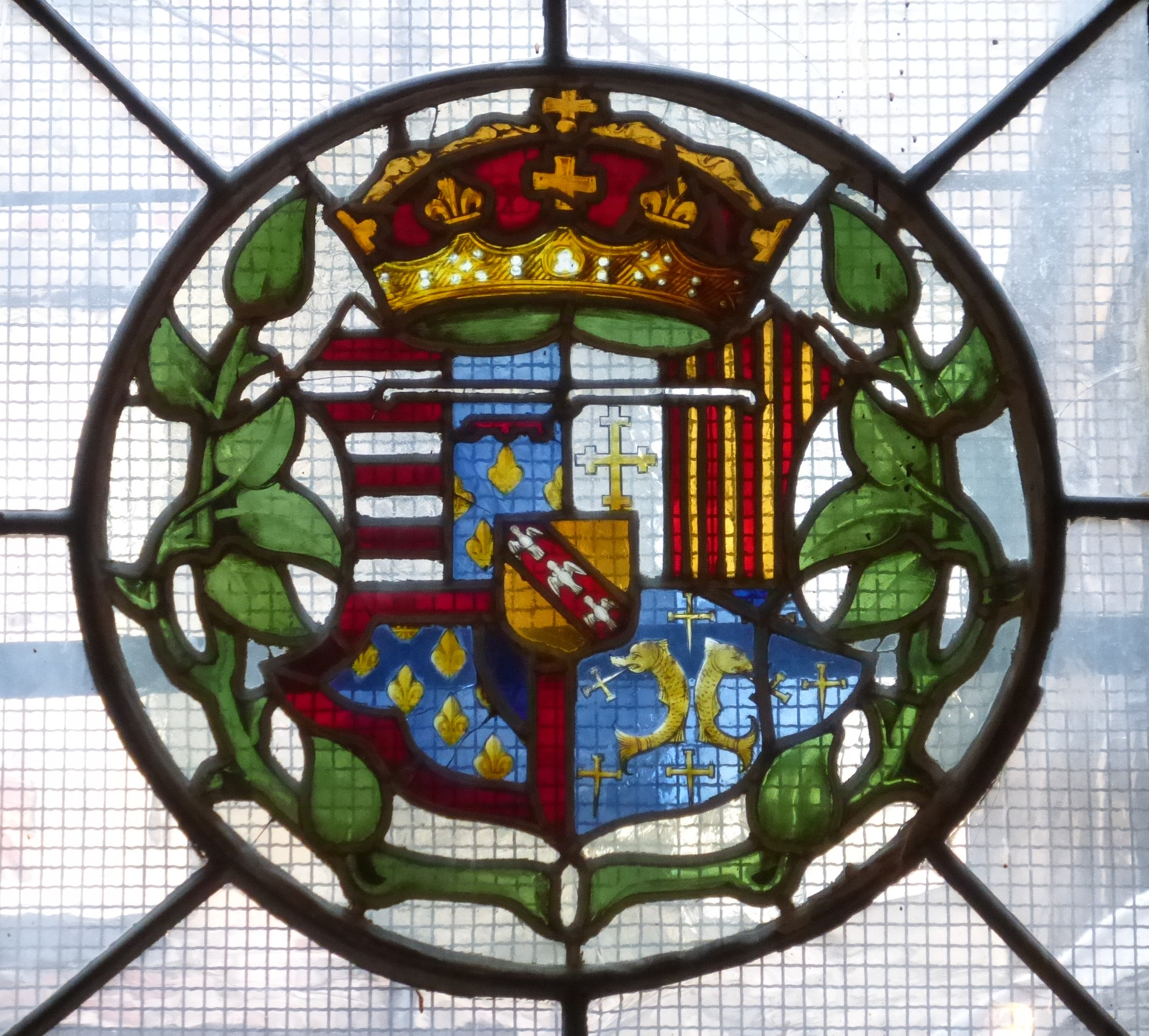
Arms of Mary of Guise in the Magdalen Chapel, Edinburgh

During her regency (1554–1560), the Queen's mother ensured the predominance of France in Scottish affairs. She put Frenchmen in charge of the treasury and the Great Seal, and the French ambassador Henri Cleutin sometimes attended the Privy Council. At first Mary of Guise cultivated a policy of limited toleration of Protestants, hoping to gain their support for her pro-French policies and against England, which from 1553 was under the rule of the Catholic Mary Tudor, who married the future Philip II of Spain in 1554. Hopes for reform of the existing church helped keep the political nation unified. But the marriage of Mary Queen of Scots to the dauphin in 1558 heightened fears that Scotland would become a French province. Reformers were given hope by the accession, in England, of the Protestant Queen Elizabeth in 1558, which created a confessional frontier in Great Britain.

=== Reforming Councils ===
The Church responded to some of the criticisms being made against it. John Hamilton, Archbishop of St Andrews, instigated a series of provincial councils (in 1549, 1552, probably in 1556 and in 1559), modelled on the contemporaneous Council of Trent. These blamed the advance of the Protestant heresies on "the corruption of morals and the profane lewdness of life in churchmen of all ranks, together with crass ignorance of literature and of the liberal arts". In 1548, attempts were made to eliminate concubinage, clerical pluralism, clerical trading, and non-residence, and to prohibit unqualified people from holding church offices. Further, the clergy were enjoined to scriptural reflection, and bishops and parsons instructed to preach at least four times a year. Monks were to be sent to university, and theologians appointed for each monastery, college, and cathedral. But in 1552, it was acknowledged that little had been accomplished. Attendance at Mass was still sparse and "the inferior clergy of this realm and the prelates have not, for the most part, attained such proficiency in the knowledge of the Holy Scriptures as to be able by their own efforts rightly to instruct the people in the Catholic faith and other things necessary to salvation or to convert the erring."

=== Expansion of Protestantism ===
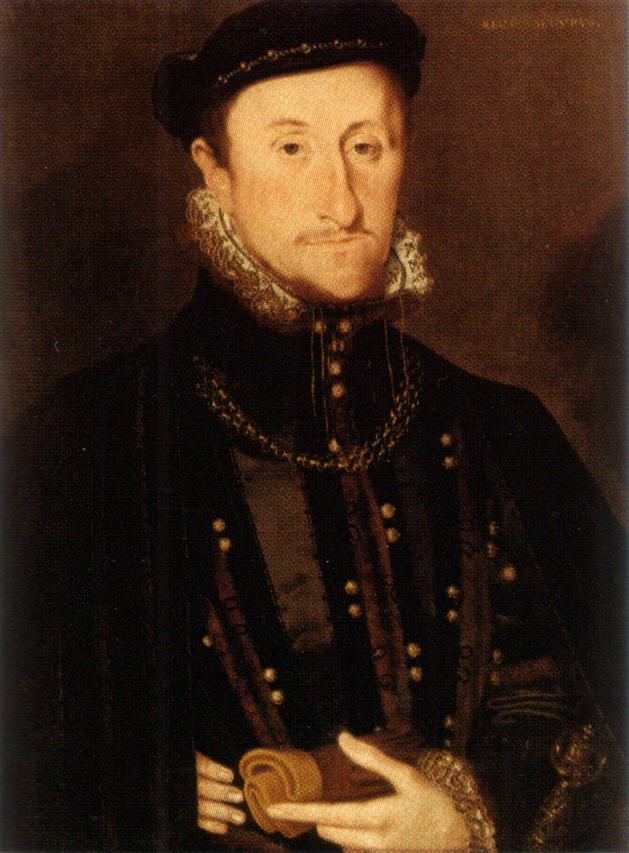
Lord James Stewart, later the 1st Earl of Moray, one of the nobles whose change of sides in 1559 helped precipitate the Reformation crisis

Protestantism continued to expand in this period and became more distinct from those who wanted reform within the existing church. Originally organised as conventicles that consisted of members of a laird's family, or kin group and social networks, who continued to attend the Catholic Church, Protestants began to develop a series of privy kirks (secret churches), whose members increasingly turned away from existing church structures. Their organisation was sufficient in 1555 for Knox to return to Scotland. He administered a Protestant communion and carried out a preaching tour of the privy kirks. He urged the members to reject Nicodemism, by which they held Protestant convictions, but attended Catholic services. Despite being offered protection by the Earl of Argyll, he returned to Geneva in 1556. In the absence of a leading clerical figure, the leadership of the movement was taken by the few nobles who had embraced Protestantism and a new generation that included Argyll's son Lord Lorne, the illegitimate son of the late King James V, Lord James Stewart (later the Earl of Moray), and Lord John Erskine. In 1557 a "first bond" was signed by Argyll, Glencairn, Morton, Lorne, and Erskine, for mutual support against "Sathan and all wicked power that does intend tyranny and truble against the foresaid congregation." This group, which eventually became known as 'the Lords of the Congregation', was a direct challenge to the existing regime.

== Reformation crisis (1559–1560) ==
On 1 January 1559 the anonymous Beggars' Summons was posted on the doors of friaries, threatening friars with eviction on the grounds that their property belonged to the genuine poor. This was calculated to appeal to the passions of the populace of towns who appeared to have particular complaints against friars. Knox returned to Scotland and preached at the church of St. John the Baptist's at Perth on 11 May on Christ cleansing the temple. The congregation responded by stripping the shrines, images and altars of the church and then sacked the local friaries and Carthusian house. The regent responded by sending troops to restore order and Glencairn led a force to defend the town's new Protestant status. A royal delegation, including Argyll and James Stuart persuaded the burgh to open its gates, but the heavy handed treatment by the regent's forces led to a breakdown in negotiations. Argyll and Stuart changed sides and the Lords of the Congregation now began raising their followers for an armed conflict.

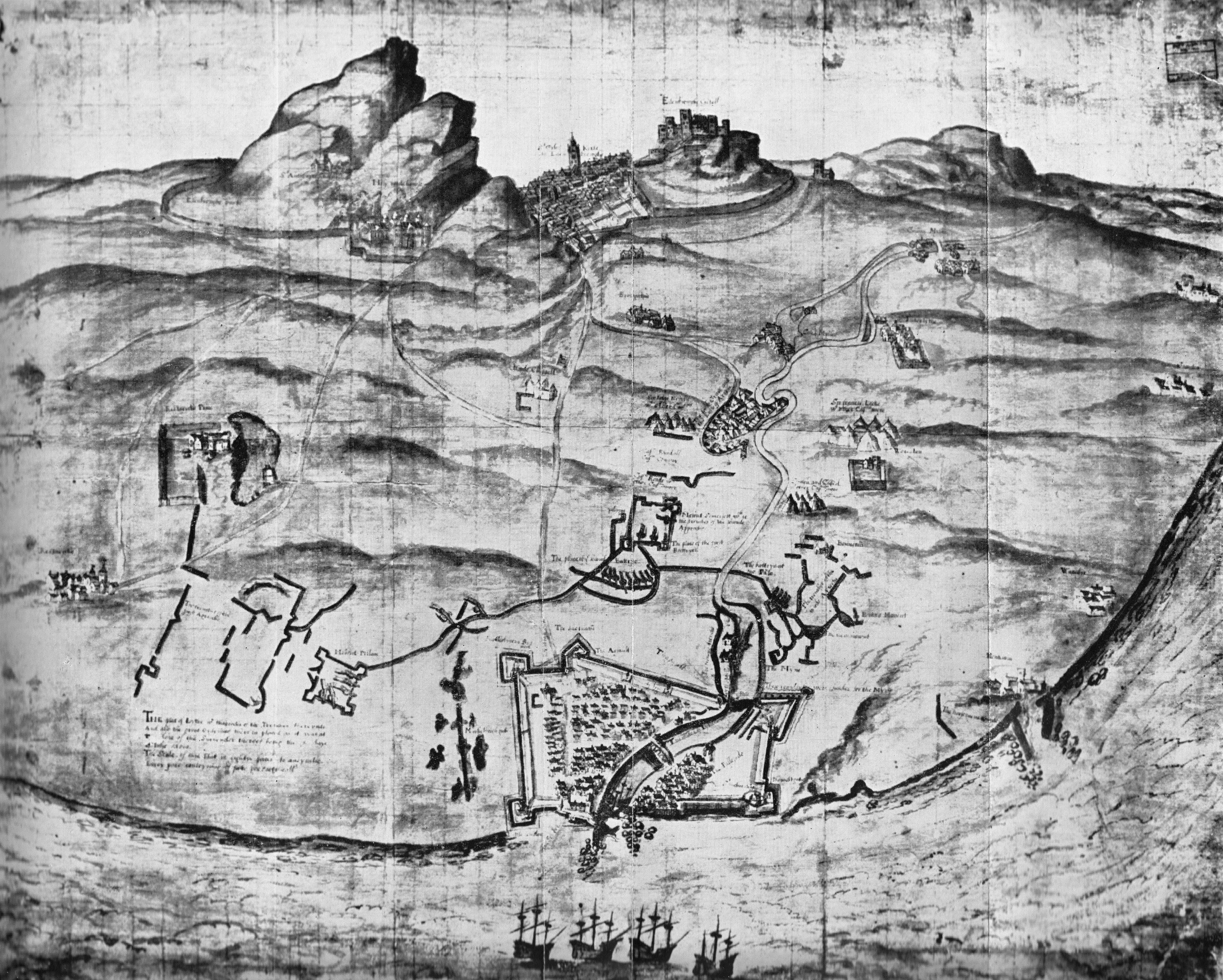
Map of the Siege of Leith dated 7 May 1560 from Petworth House

A series of local reformations followed, with Protestant minorities gaining control of various regions and burghs, often with the support of local lairds and using intimidation, while avoiding the creation of Catholic martyrs, to carry out a "cleansing" of friaries and churches, followed by the appointment of Protestant preachers. Such reformations occurred in conservative Aberdeen and the ecclesiastical capital of St. Andrews together with other eastern ports. In June, Mary of Guise responded by dispatching a French army to St. Andrews to restore control, but it was halted by superior numbers at Cupar Muir and forced to retreat. Edinburgh fell to the Lords in July, and Mary moved her base to Dunbar. The arrival of French reinforcements of 1,800 men forced the Lords onto the defensive and they abandoned the capital.

The Lords appealed for help from England and Mary from France. English agents managed the safe return of Earl of Arran, the eldest son and heir of Chatelherault, allowing him to accept the leadership of the Lords. In October the regent was declared "suspended" and replaced by a "great council of the realm". Mary of Guise's forces continued to advance, once again threatening St. Andrews. The situation was transformed by the arrival of the English fleet in the Firth of Forth in January 1560, and the French retreated to the stronghold of Leith near Edinburgh. The English and the Lords agreed further support by the Treaty of Berwick in February 1560 and an English army crossed the border to lay siege to the French in Leith. Mary of Guise fell ill and died in June. With no sign of reinforcements, the French opened negotiations. Under the Treaty of Edinburgh (5 July 1560) both the French and English removed their troops from Scotland, leaving the Protestant Lords in control of the country. The Lords accepted Mary Queen of Scots and her husband, now Francis II of France, as monarchs and were given permission to hold a parliament, although it was not to touch the issue of religion.

== Reformation Parliament ==
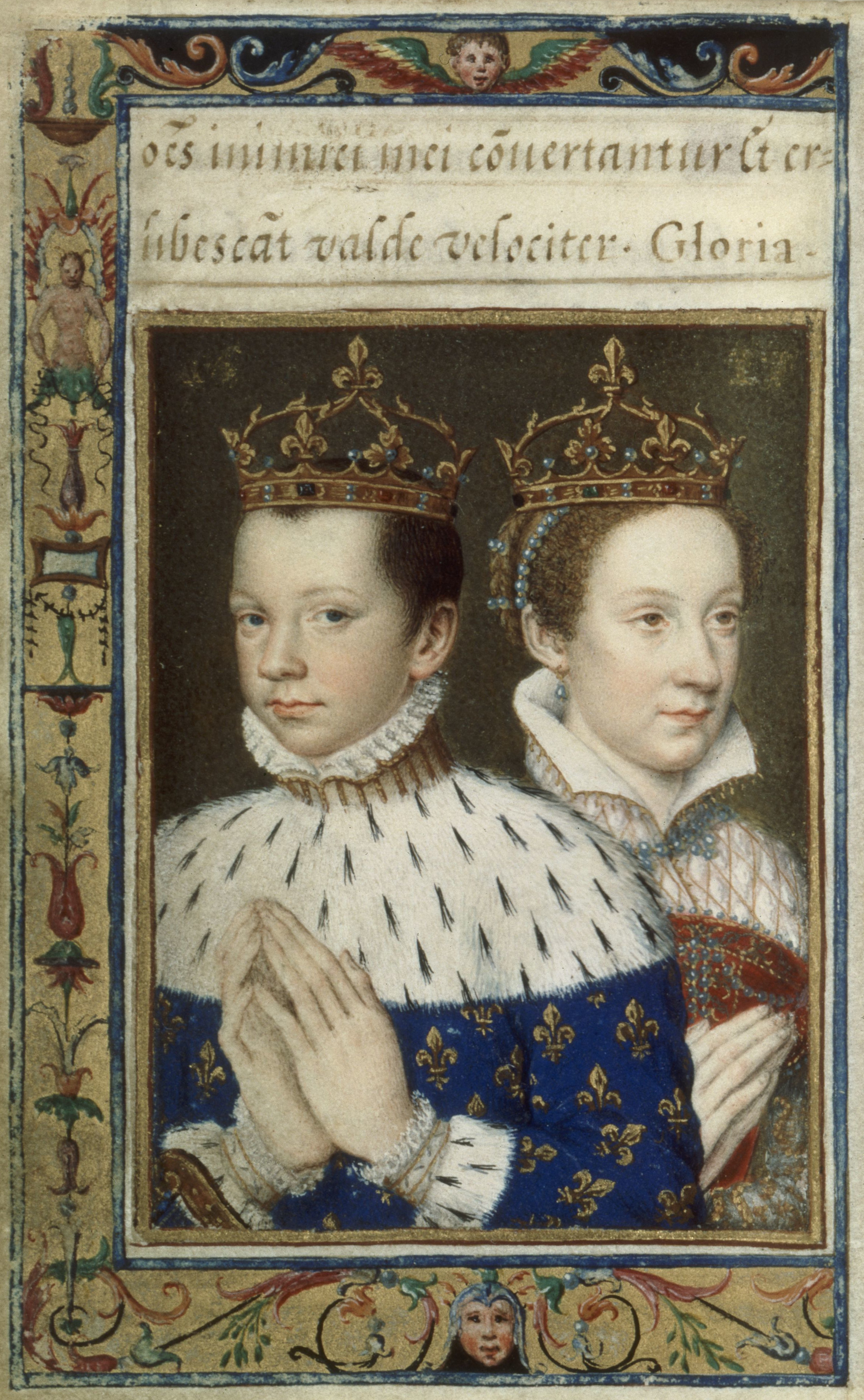
Mary Queen of Scots and her teenage husband Francis II of France in 1559, in whose names the Scottish Reformation Parliament was called

The Parliament of Scotland met in Edinburgh 1 August 1560. Fourteen earls, six bishops, nineteen lords, twenty-one abbots, twenty-two burgh commissioners and over a hundred lairds, claimed the right to sit. Ignoring the provisions of the Treaty of Edinburgh, on 17 August, Parliament approved a Reformed Confession of Faith (the Scots Confession), and on 24 August it passed three Acts that abolished the old faith in Scotland. Under these, all previous acts not in conformity with the Reformed Confession were annulled. The sacraments were reduced to two (Baptism and Communion) to be performed by reformed preachers alone. The celebration of the Mass was made punishable by a series of penalties (ultimately death) and Papal jurisdiction in Scotland was repudiated. The Queen declined to endorse the acts that Parliament had passed and the new kirk existed in a state of legal uncertainty.

== First Book of Discipline ==
The Lords had intended Parliament to consider a Book of Reformation, which they had commissioned and was largely the work of Knox. They were unhappy with the document and established a committee of "six Johns", including Knox, John Winram, John Spottiswood, John Willock, John Douglas, and John Row, to produce a revised version. The result of the delay was that the document, known as the First Book of Discipline, was considered not by the full Parliament, but only by a thinly attended convention of nobles and about 30 lairds in January 1561 and then only approved individually and not collectively. The Book proposed a programme of parish-based reformation that would use the resources of the old Church to pay for a network of ministers, a parish-based school system, university education and poor relief. This proposal for the use of church wealth was rejected. Instead, an Act of Council kept two-thirds of the Church's assets in the hands of its existing holders, while the remaining third was divided between the Crown and the reformist measures. The educational programme was abandoned, ministers remained poorly paid, and the Church was underfunded.

== Post-Reformation church ==
=== Confession of faith ===
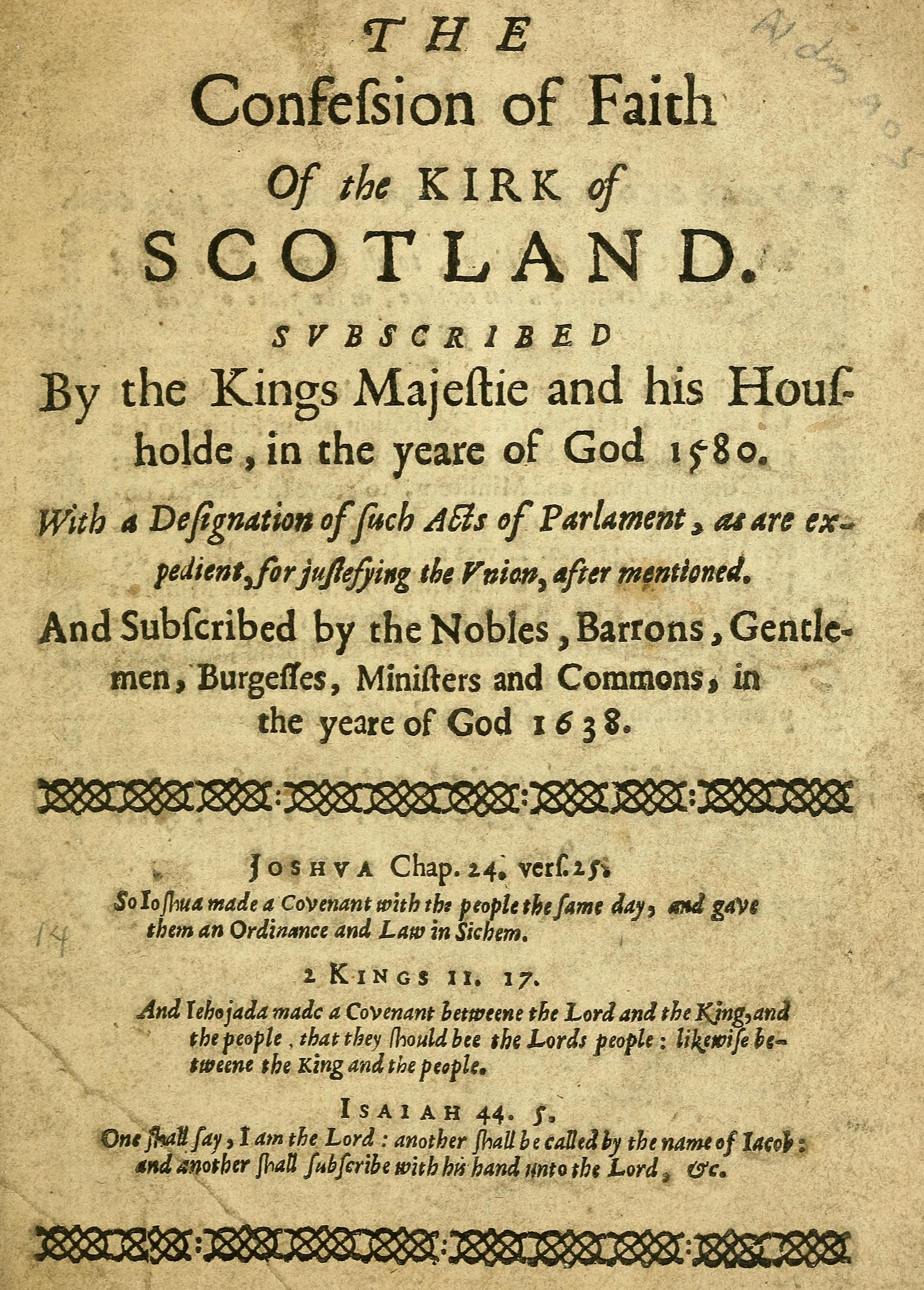
A later edition of the Scots Confession

The Scots Confession was produced by Knox and five colleagues in four days. Its structure parallels that of the Apostles' Creed, with 25 chapters based around themes of the Father, Son, Church and Consummation. It remained the standard of the Kirk until it was replaced by the Westminster Confession, negotiated with English Parliamentary allies during the English Civil War and adopted by the Kirk in 1647. The Confession was strongly Calvinist in tone. It emphasised the "inscrutable providence" of God, who had determined all things. It stressed the extreme depravity of mankind, who deserved eternal damnation and the mercy of God in selecting a portion of humanity for salvation through grace alone. It denied transubstantiation, but retained the real presence in the Eucharist. It largely avoided negative emotive condemnations of Catholicism, focusing on setting out the new faith in simple language. It saw the Kirk as a "catholik" community of, "the elect of all nations, realms, nations, tongues, Jews and Gentiles". In 1581, as part of a reaction to the perceived threat of Catholicism, the court signed a King's, or Negative Confession, probably commissioned by James VI, that much more harshly denounced Catholicism.

=== Liturgy and worship ===
The Reformation saw a complete transformation of religious observance. In the place of the many holy days and festivals of the Catholic Church and the occasional observance of the Mass, the single surviving holy day was Sunday and regular attendance and participation was required of the laity. Latin was abandoned in favour of the vernacular. Congregational psalm singing replaced the elaborate polyphony of trained choirs. An emphasis was put on the Bible and the sermon, which was often longer than an hour, although many parishes, which had no minister, would have had only a "readers service", of psalms, prayers and Bible readings. The Geneva Bible was widely adopted. Protestant preachers fleeing Marian persecutions in England had brought with them Edward VI's second Book of Common Prayer (of 1552), which was commended by the Lords of the Congregation. Knox initially supported it, but before leaving Geneva, and with the encouragement of Calvin, he had written his own Book of Common Order and it was this that was printed and approved by the General Assembly of 1562. Enlarged, it was reprinted with the Confession and the Psalms in metre in 1564, and it remained the standard until replaced with the Westminster Directory in 1643. A Gaelic translation of the Book of Common Order was produced in 1563, the first book printed in Gaelic, but there would be no Gaelic Bible until the 18th century.

=== Church polity ===
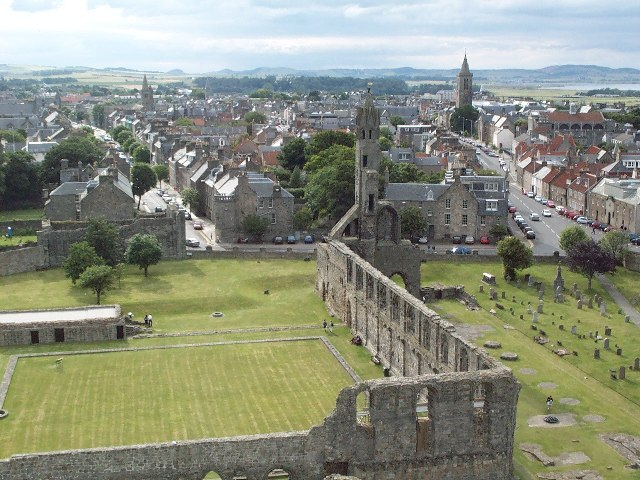
The ruins of St Andrews Cathedral; the stone was taken and reused in many of the surrounding houses

The First Book of Discipline envisaged the establishment of reformed ministers in each of approximately 1,080 parishes. By the end of 1561, 240 of these places had been filled. By 1567 there were about 850 clergy and by 1574 there were just over 1,000. These were mainly concentrated in the south and east. In the Highlands there were shortages and very few spoke the Gaelic of the local population. The universities were unable to supply sufficient trained ministers over a generation and many (over three-quarters in 1574) held the junior post of readers, rather than qualified ministers. The bulk of these were former Catholic clergy. The untidy system of thirteen medieval dioceses was to be replaced by ten more rational districts, each to be overseen by a superintendent. This plan was complicated by the conversion of three bishops to Protestantism, who were allowed to remain in their posts. Few superintendents were appointed and temporary commissioners were nominated to fill the gaps. In 1576, when the General Assembly considered the structure of the Kirk, it recognised five offices: archbishops, bishops, superintendents, commissioners, and visitors.

Beside these posts was a system of church courts of kirk sessions and presbyteries, which dealt with discipline and administration. Some local sessions had existed before 1560, moderators emerged in 1563, but the presbytery not until 1580. By the 1590s Scotland was organized into about 50 presbyteries with about 20 ministers in each. Above them stood a dozen or so synods and at the apex the general assembly. The system of kirk sessions gave considerable power within the new kirk to local lairds, who were able to take on the dignity and authority of an elder.

=== Continued reformation ===
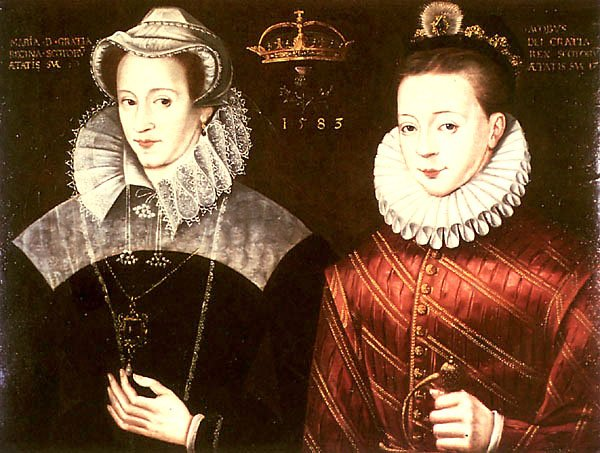
Mary Queen of Scots depicted with her son, James VI and I; in reality, Mary saw her son for the last time when he was ten months old

In the 1560s the majority of the population was probably still Catholic in persuasion, and the Kirk would find it difficult to penetrate the Highlands and Islands, but began a gradual process of conversion and consolidation that, compared with reformations elsewhere, was conducted with little persecution. The monasteries were not dissolved but allowed to die out with their monks, and before 1573 no holders of benefices were turned out, even for refusing to conform. The focus on the parish church as the centre of worship meant the abandonment of much of the complex religious provision of chapelries, monasteries and cathedrals, many of which were allowed to decay or, like the Cathedral at St Andrews, were mined for dressed stone to be used in local houses.

== Second Reformation crisis (1567) ==
When her husband Francis II died in 1560, Mary, now 19, elected to return to Scotland to take up the government. She gained an agreement that she would be the only person to partake legally in Catholic services and did not attempt to re-impose Catholicism on her subjects, thus angering the chief Catholic nobles. Her six-year personal reign was marred by a series of crises, largely caused by the intrigues and rivalries of the leading nobles. The murder of her secretary, David Riccio, was followed by that of her unpopular second husband Lord Darnley, father of her infant son, and her abduction by, and marriage to, the Earl of Bothwell, who was implicated in Darnley's murder. Opposition to Bothwell led to the formation of a coalition of nobles, who styled themselves as the Confederate Lords. Michael Lynch describes the events of 1567 as "second Reformation crisis". Mary and Bothwell confronted the Lords at Carberry Hill on 15 June 1567, but their forces melted away. He fled and she was imprisoned in Lochleven Castle. Ten days after the confrontation at Carberry Hill, the General Assembly met in Edinburgh with the aim of rooting out "superstition and idolatry". The Reformation settlement of 1567 was much more firmly Calvinist than that of 1560. The Assembly set out a programme of reform that included the ratification of the legislation of 1560, better provision of the ministry, new resources and manpower for the parishes, a purge of the teachers in the universities and schools, and a closer relationship with parliament. A parliament was called in December, which allowed the acts passed by the Reformation Parliament to be ratified. The subsequent religious settlement would be worked out over the 1570s against a background of civil war and unstable regencies.

== Reign of James VI (1567–1625) ==
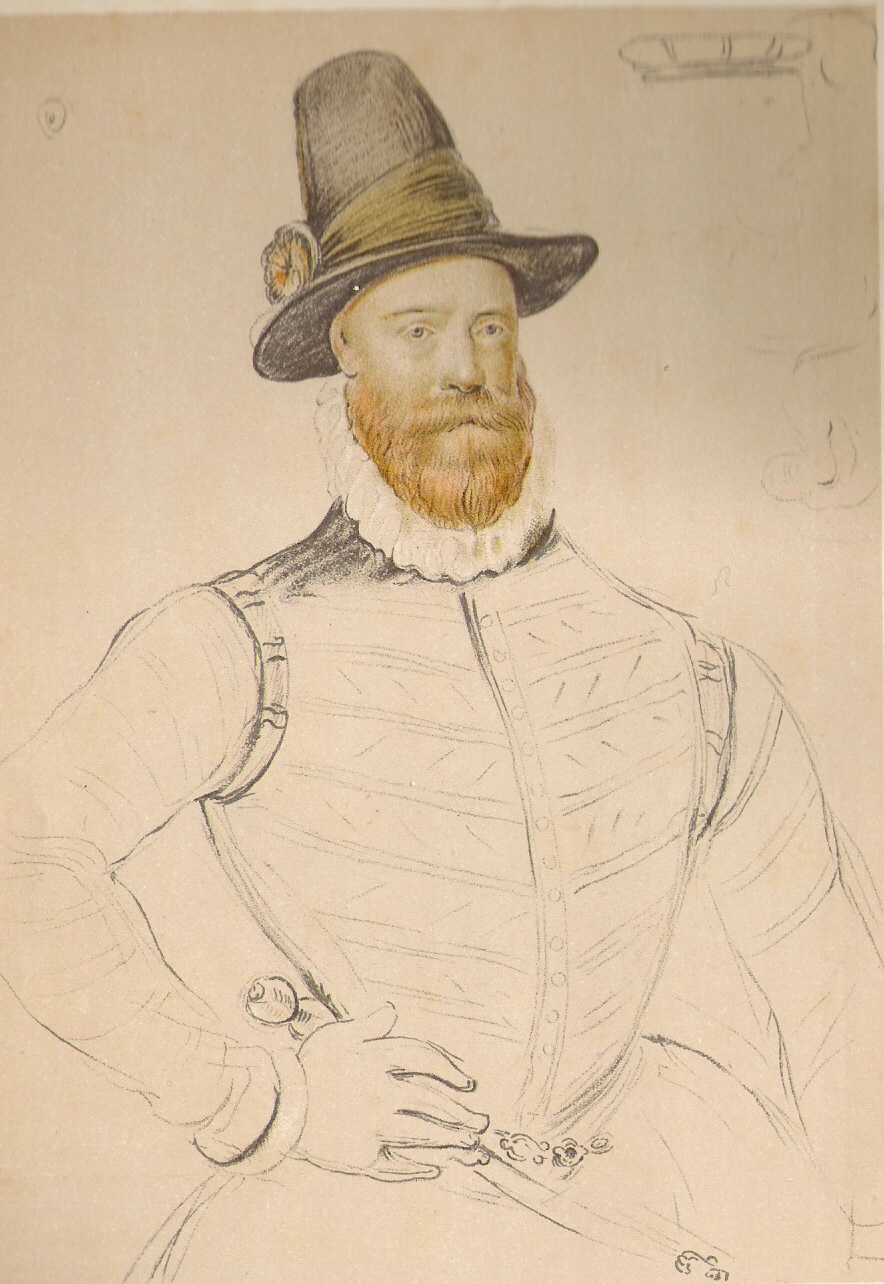
The 4th Earl of Morton, who became the last regent of James VI's reign

In July 1567, Mary was forced to abdicate in favour of her 13-month-old son James VI. James was to be brought up a Protestant and the government was to be run by a series of regents, beginning with Moray, until James began to assert his independence in 1581. Mary eventually escaped and attempted to regain the throne by force. After her defeat at the Battle of Langside in May 1568, by forces loyal to the King's Party, led by Moray, she took refuge in England, leaving her son in their hands. In Scotland, the King's Party fought a civil war on behalf of the regency against Mary's supporters. This ended, after English intervention, with the surrender of Edinburgh Castle in May 1573. In 1578, a Second Book of Discipline was adopted, which was much more clearly Presbyterian in outlook.

In England, Mary became a focal point for Catholic conspirators and was eventually executed for treason in 1587 on the orders of her kinswoman Elizabeth I. James was Calvinist in doctrine, but strongly supported episcopacy and resisted the independence, or even right to interfere in government, of the Kirk, which became associated with the followers of Andrew Melville, known as the Melvillians. He used his powers to call the General Assembly where he wished, limiting the ability of more radical clergy to attend. He paid for moderate clergy to be present, negotiated with members, and manipulated its business in order to limit the independence of the Kirk. By 1600 he had appointed three parliamentary bishops. By the end of his reign there were 11 bishops and diocesan episcopacy had been restored, although there was still strong support for Presbyterianism within the Kirk.

== Catholic survival ==
Although officially illegal, Roman Catholicism survived in parts of Scotland. The hierarchy of the Church played a relatively small role and the initiative was left to lay leaders. Where nobles or local lairds offered protection it continued to thrive, as with Clanranald on South Uist, or in the north-east where the Earl of Huntly was the most important figure. In these areas Catholic sacraments and practices were maintained with relative openness. Members of the nobility were probably reluctant to pursue each other over matters of religion, because of strong personal and social ties. An English report in 1600 suggested that a third of nobles and gentry were still Catholic in inclination. In most of Scotland, except for the Outer Hebrides, Catholicism became an underground faith in private households, connected by ties of kinship. This reliance on the household meant that women often became important as the upholders and transmitters of the faith, such as in the case of Lady Fernihurst in the Borders. They transformed their households into centres of religious activity and offered places of safety for priests.

Because the Reformation took over the existing structures and assets of the Church, any attempted recovery by the Catholic hierarchy was extremely difficult. After the collapse of Mary's cause in the civil wars in the 1570s, and any hope of a national restoration of the old faith, the hierarchy began to treat Scotland as a mission area. The leading order of the Counter-Reformation, the newly founded Jesuits, initially took relatively little interest in Scotland as a target of missionary work. Their effectiveness was limited by rivalries between different orders at Rome. The initiative was taken by a small group of Scots connected with the Crichton family, who had supplied the bishops of Dunkeld. They joined the Jesuit order and returned to attempt conversions. Their focus was mainly on the court, which led them into involvement in a series of complex political plots and entanglements. The majority of surviving Scottish lay followers were largely ignored.

== Impact ==
=== Education ===
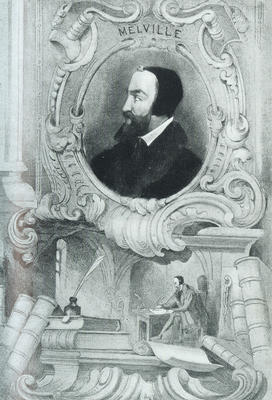
Andrew Melville, credited with major reforms in Scottish universities in the 16th century

The humanist concern with widening education was shared by the Protestant reformers, with a desire for a godly people replacing the aim of having educated citizens. The First Book of Discipline set out a plan for a school in every parish, but this proved financially impossible. In the burghs the old schools were maintained, with the song schools and a number of new foundations becoming reformed grammar schools or ordinary parish schools. Schools were supported by a combination of kirk funds, contributions from local heritors or burgh councils and parents that could pay. They were inspected by kirk sessions, who checked for the quality of teaching and doctrinal purity. There were also large number of unregulated "adventure schools", which sometimes fulfilled a local need and sometimes took pupils away from the official schools. Outside of the established burgh schools, masters often combined their positions with other employment, particularly minor posts within the Kirk, such as clerk. At their best, the curriculum included catechism, Latin, French, Classical literature and sports.

Scotland's universities underwent a series of reforms associated with Andrew Melville, who returned from Geneva to become principal of the University of Glasgow in 1574. A distinguished linguist, philosopher and poet, he had trained in Paris and studied law at Poitiers, before moving to Geneva and developing an interest in Protestant theology. Influenced by the anti-Aristotelian Petrus Ramus, he placed an emphasis on simplified logic and elevated languages and sciences to the same status as philosophy, allowing accepted ideas in all areas to be challenged. He introduced new specialist teaching staff, replacing the system of "regenting", where one tutor took the students through the entire arts curriculum. Metaphysics were abandoned and Greek became compulsory in the first year, followed by Aramaic, Syriac and Hebrew, launching a new fashion for ancient and biblical languages. Glasgow had probably been declining as a university before his arrival, but students now began to arrive in large numbers. He assisted in the reconstruction of Marischal College, Aberdeen, and to do for St Andrews what he had done for Glasgow, he was appointed Principal of St Mary's College, St Andrews, in 1580. The University of Edinburgh developed out of public lectures that were established in the town in the 1540s on law, Greek, Latin and philosophy, under the patronage of Mary of Guise. The "Tounis College" become the University of Edinburgh in 1582. The results of these changes were a revitalisation of all Scottish universities, which were now producing a quality of education the equal of that offered anywhere in Europe.

=== Literature ===
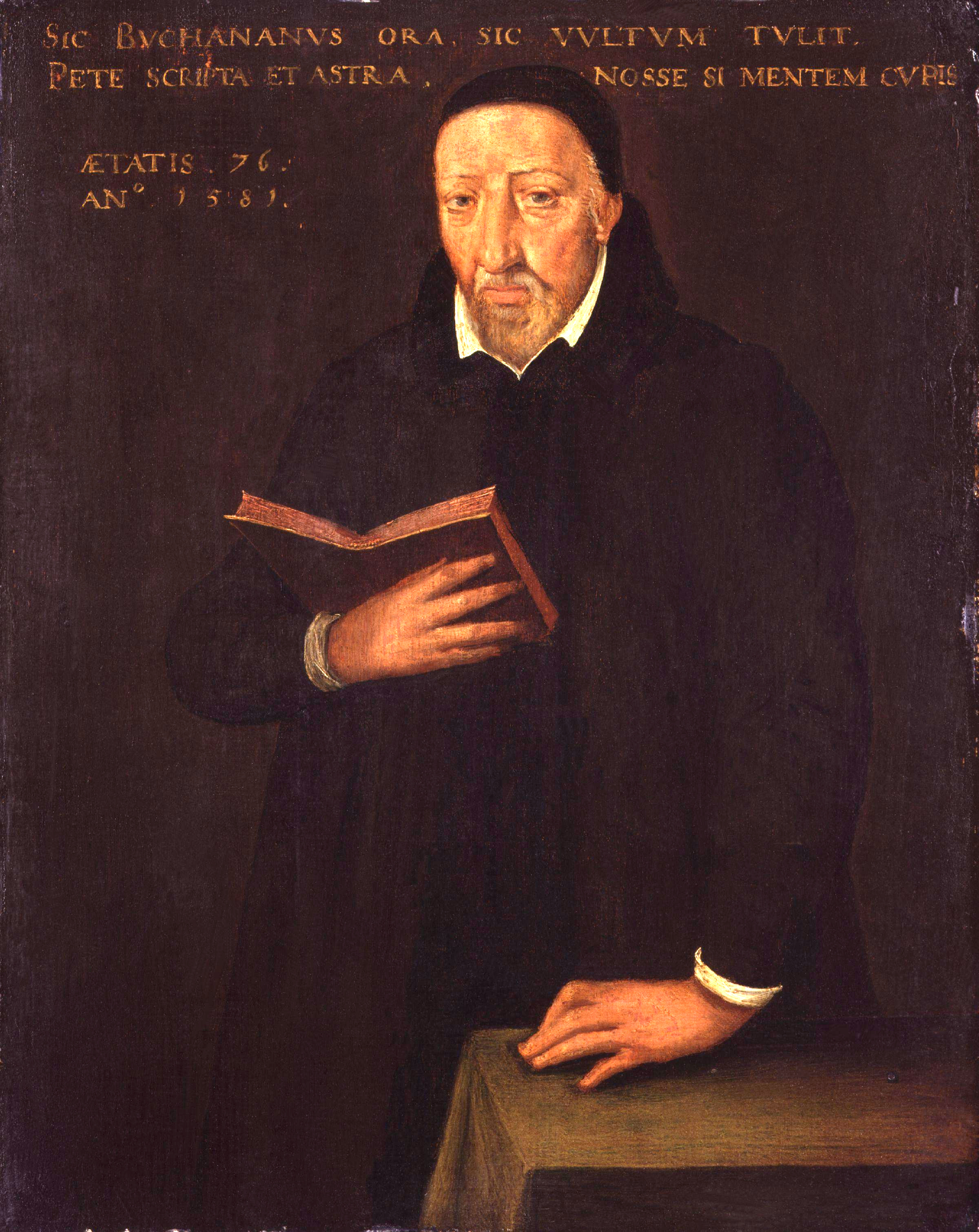
George Buchanan, playwright, poet and political theorist, by Arnold Bronckorst

Medieval Scotland probably had its own Mystery plays, often performed by craft guilds, like one described as ludi de ly haliblude and staged at Aberdeen in 1440 and 1445 and which was probably connected with the feast of Corpus Christi, but no texts are extant. Legislation was enacted against folk plays in 1555, and against liturgical plays ("clerk-plays or comedies based on the canonical scriptures") in 1575 by the General Assembly of the Church of Scotland. Attempts to ban folk plays were more leniently applied and less successful than once assumed. They continued into the 17th century, with parishioners in Aberdeen reproved for parading and dancing in the street with bells at weddings and Yule in 1605, Robin Hood and May plays at Kelso in 1611 and Yuletide guising at Perth in 1634. The Kirk also allowed some plays, particularly in schools, when they served their own ends for education, as in the comedy about the Prodigal Son permitted at St. Andrews in 1574.

More formal plays included those of James Wedderburn, who wrote anti-Catholic tragedies and comedies in Scots around 1540, before he was forced to flee into exile. These included the Beheading of Johne the Baptist and the Historie of Dyonisius the Tyraonne, which were performed at Dundee. David Lyndsay (c. 1486 –1555), diplomat and the head of the Lyon Court, was a prolific poet and dramatist. He produced an interlude at Linlithgow Palace for the king and queen thought to be a version of his play The Thrie Estaitis in 1540, which satirised the corruption of church and state, and which is the only complete play to survive from before the Reformation. George Buchanan (1506–1582) was major influence on Continental theatre with plays such as Jepheths and Baptistes, which influenced Pierre Corneille and Jean Racine and through them the neo-classical tradition in French drama, but his impact in Scotland was limited by his choice of Latin as a medium. The anonymous The Maner of the Cyring of ane Play (before 1568) and Philotus (published in London in 1603), are isolated examples of surviving plays. The later is a vernacular Scots comedy of errors, probably designed for court performance for Mary, Queen of Scots or James VI. The same system of professional companies of players and theatres that developed in England in this period was absent in Scotland, but James VI signalled his interest in drama by arranging for a company of English players to erect a playhouse and perform in 1599.

The Kirk also discouraged poetry that was not devotional in nature. Nevertheless, poets from this period included Richard Maitland of Lethington (1496–1586), who produced meditative and satirical verses; John Rolland (fl. 1530–1575), who wrote allegorical satires and courtier and minister Alexander Hume (c. 1556 –1609), whose corpus of work includes nature poetry and epistolary verse. Alexander Scott's (?1520–82/3) use of short verse designed to be sung to music, opened the way for the Castalian poets of James VI's adult reign.

=== Art ===
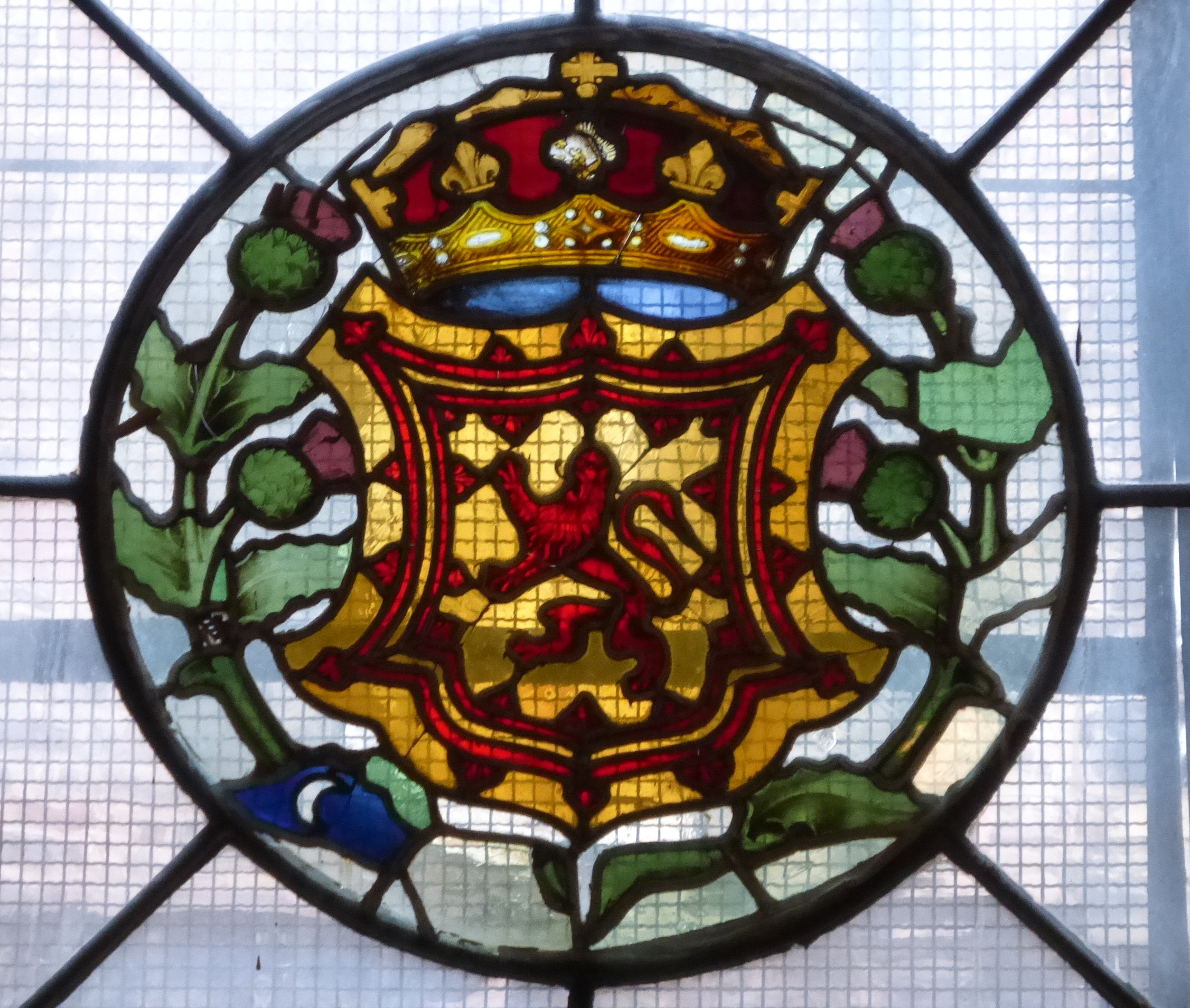
A rare example of stained glass that survived the Reformation, in the Magdalen Chapel, Edinburgh

Scotland's ecclesiastical art paid a heavy toll as a result of Reformation iconoclasm, with the almost total loss of medieval stained glass and religious sculpture and paintings. The only significant surviving pre-Reformation stained glass in Scotland is a window of four roundels in the Magdalen Chapel of Cowgate, Edinburgh, completed in 1544. Wood carving can be seen at King's College, Aberdeen and Dunblane Cathedral. In the West Highlands, where there had been a hereditary caste of monumental sculptors, the uncertainty and loss of patronage caused by the rejection of monuments in the Reformation meant that they moved into other branches of the Gaelic learned orders or took up other occupations. The lack of transfer of carving skills is noticeable in the decline in quality when gravestones were next commissioned from the start of the 17th century.

According to N. Prior, the nature of the Scottish Reformation may have had wider effects, limiting the creation of a culture of public display and meaning that art was channelled into more austere forms of expression with an emphasis on private and domestic restraint. The loss of ecclesiastical patronage that resulted from the Reformation, meant that native craftsmen and artists turned to secular patrons. One result of this was the flourishing of Scottish Renaissance painted ceilings and walls, with large numbers of private houses of burgesses, lairds and lords gaining often highly detailed and coloured patterns and scenes, of which over 100 examples survive. These were undertaken by unnamed Scottish artists using continental pattern books that often led to the incorporation of humanist moral and philosophical symbolism, with elements that call on heraldry, piety, classical myths and allegory. The earliest surviving example is at the Hamilton palace of Kinneil, West Lothian, decorated in the 1550s for the then regent the James Hamilton, Earl of Arran. Other examples include the ceiling at Prestongrange House, undertaken in 1581 for Mark Kerr, Commendator of Newbattle, and the long gallery at Pinkie House, painted for Alexander Seaton, Earl of Dunfermline in 1621.

=== Architecture ===
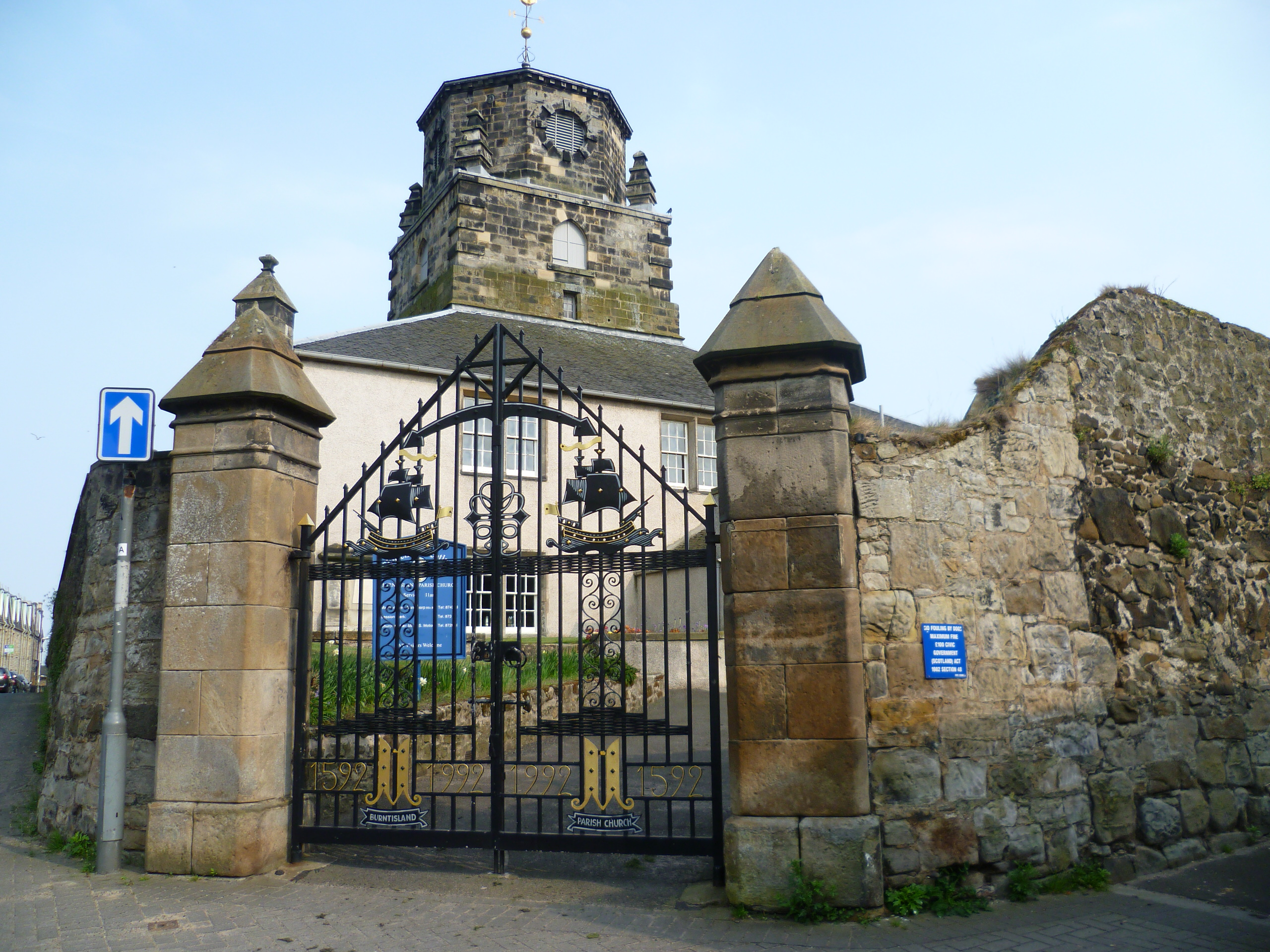
Burntisland Parish Kirk, its original wooden steeple now replaced by one of stone

The Reformation revolutionised church architecture in Scotland. Calvinists rejected ornamentation in places of worship, seeing no need for elaborate buildings divided up for the purpose of ritual. This resulted in the widespread destruction of Medieval church furnishings, ornaments and decoration. New churches were built and existing churches adapted for reformed services, particularly by placing the pulpit centrally in the church, as preaching was at the centre of worship. Many of the earliest buildings were simple gabled rectangles, a style that continued into the 17th century, as at Dunnottar Castle in the 1580s, Greenock's Old West Kirk (1591) and Durness (1619). These churches often have windows on the south wall (and none on the north), which became a characteristic of Reformation kirks. There were continuities with pre-Reformation materials, with some churches using rubble for walls, as at Kemback in Fife (1582). Others employed dressed stone and a few added wooden steeples, as at Burntisland (1592). The church of Greyfriars, Edinburgh, built between 1602 and 1620, used a rectangular layout with a largely Gothic form, but that at Dirleton (1612), had a more sophisticated classical style. A variation of the rectangular church developed in post-Reformation Scotland, and often used when adapting existing churches, was the T-shaped plan, which allowed the maximum number of parishioners to be near the pulpit. Examples can be seen at Kemback and Prestonpans after 1595. This plan continued to be used into the 17th century as at Weem (1600), Anstruther Easter, Fife (1634–1644) and New Cumnock, Ayreshire (1657). In the 17th century a Greek cross plan was used for churches such as Cawdor (1619) and Fenwick (1643). In most of these cases one arm of the cross would have been closed off as a laird's aisle, meaning that they were in effect T-plan churches.

=== Music ===
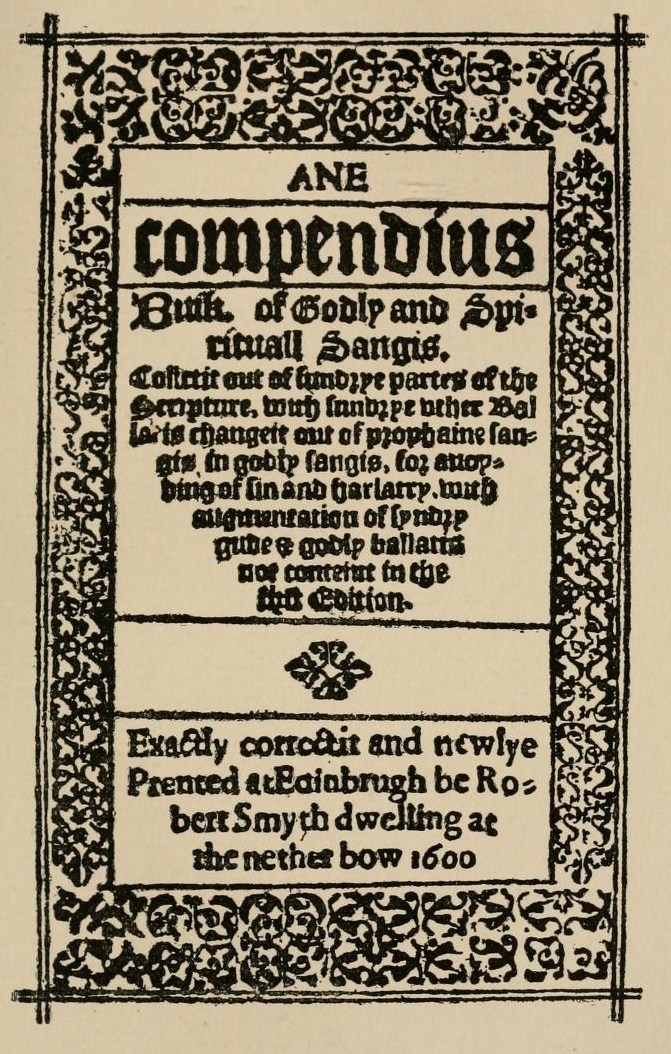
A reprint of the 1600 cover of The Gude and Godlie Ballatis

The Reformation had a severe impact on church music. The song schools of the abbeys, cathedrals and collegiate churches were closed down, choirs disbanded, music books and manuscripts destroyed and organs removed from churches. The Lutheranism that influenced the early Scottish Reformation attempted to accommodate Catholic musical traditions into worship, drawing on Latin hymns and vernacular songs. The most important product of this tradition in Scotland was The Gude and Godlie Ballatis (1567), which were spiritual satires on popular ballads that have been commonly attributed to brothers James, John and Robert Wedderburn. Never adopted by the Kirk, they nevertheless remained popular and were reprinted from the 1540s to the 1620s.

Later the Calvinism that came to dominate the Scottish Reformation was much more hostile to Catholic musical tradition and popular music, placing an emphasis on what was biblical, which meant the Psalms. The Scottish Psalter of 1564 was commissioned by the Assembly of the Church. It drew on the work of French musician Clément Marot, Calvin's contributions to the Strasbourg Psalter of 1539 and English writers, particularly the 1561 edition of the Psalter produced by William Whittingham for the English congregation in Geneva. The intention was to produce individual tunes for each psalm, but of 150 psalms, 105 had proper tunes and in the 17th century, common tunes, which could be used for psalms with the same metre, became more frequent. Because entire congregations would now sing these psalms, unlike the trained choirs who had sung the many parts of polyphonic hymns, there was a need for simplicity and most church compositions were confined to homophonic settings.

During his personal reign, James VI attempted to revive the song schools, with an act of parliament passed in 1579, demanding that councils of the largest burghs set up "ane sang scuill with ane maister sufficient and able for insturctioun of the yowth in the said science of musik". Five new schools were opened within four years of the act coming into force, and by 1633 there were at least 25. Most of those burghs without song schools made provision within their grammar schools. Polyphony was incorporated into editions of the Psalter from 1625, but in the few locations where these settings were used, the congregation sang the melody and trained singers the contra-tenor, treble and bass parts. The triumph of the Presbyterians in the National Covenant of 1638 led to an end of polyphony, and a new psalter in common metre, without tunes, was published in 1650. In 1666 The Twelve Tunes for the Church of Scotland, composed in Four Parts (which actually contained 14 tunes), designed for use with the 1650 Psalter, was first published in Aberdeen. It would go through five editions by 1720. By the late seventeenth century these two works had become the basic corpus of the psalmody sung in the Kirk.

=== Women ===
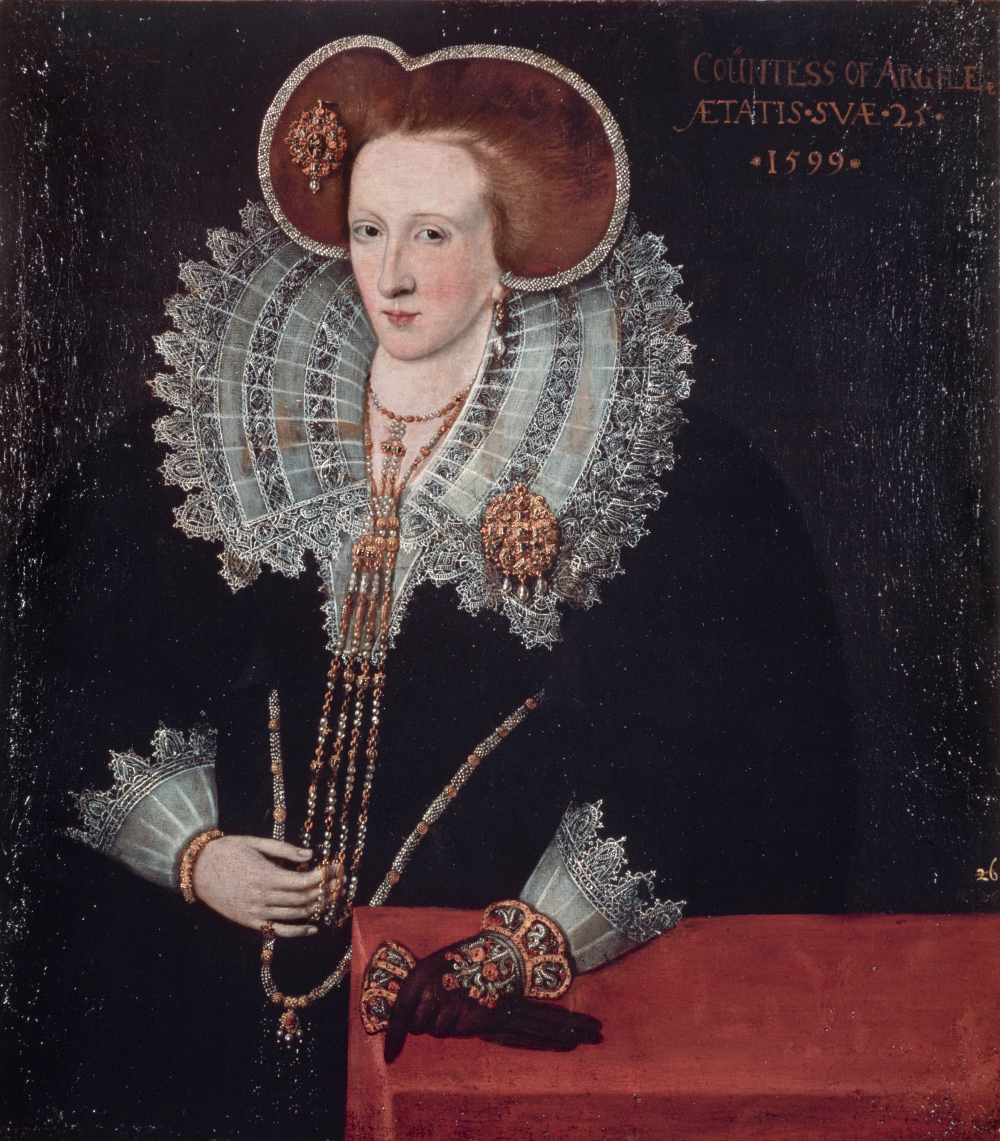
Agnes Douglas, Countess of Argyll (1574–1607), attributed to Adrian Vanson

Early modern Scotland was a patriarchal society, in which men had total authority over women. From the 1560s the post-Reformation marriage service underlined this by stating that a wife "is in subjection and under governance of her husband, so long as they both continue alive". In politics the theory of patriarchy was complicated by regencies led by Margaret Tudor and Mary of Guise and by the advent of a regnant queen in Mary, Queen of Scots from 1561. Concerns over this threat to male authority were exemplified by John Knox's The First Blast of the Trumpet Against the Monstruous Regiment of Women (1558), which advocated the deposition of all reigning queens. Most of the political nation took a pragmatic view of the situation, accepting Mary as queen, but the strains that this paradox created may have played a part in the later difficulties of the reign.

Before the Reformation, the extensive marriage bars for kinship meant that most noble marriages necessitated a papal dispensation, which could later be used as grounds for annulment if the marriage proved politically or personally inconvenient, although there was no divorce as such. Separation from bed and board was allowed in exceptional circumstances, usually adultery. Under the reformed Kirk, divorce was allowed on grounds of adultery or desertion. Scotland was one of the first countries to allow desertion as legal grounds for divorce and, unlike England, divorce cases were initiated relatively far down the social scale.

After the Reformation the contest between the widespread belief in the limited intellectual and moral capacity of women and the desire for women to take personal moral responsibility, particularly as wives and mothers, intensified. In Protestantism this necessitated an ability to learn and understand the catechism and even to be able to independently read the Bible. Most commentators, even those that tended to encourage the education of girls, thought they should not receive the same academic education as boys. In the lower ranks of society, women benefited from the expansion of the parish schools system that took place after the Reformation, but were usually outnumbered by boys, often taught separately, for a shorter time and to a lower level. They were frequently taught reading, sewing and knitting but not writing. Female illiteracy rates based on signatures among female servants were around 90% from the late 17th to the early 18th centuries, and perhaps 85% for women of all ranks by 1750, compared with 35% for men. Among the nobility there were many educated and cultured women, of which Queen Mary is the most obvious example.

Church attendance played an important part in the lives of many women. Women were largely excluded from the administration of the Kirk, but when heads of households voted on the appointment of a new minister, some parishes allowed women in that position to participate. In the post-Reformation period there was a criminalisation of women. Women were disciplined in kirk sessions and civil courts for stereotypical offences including scolding and prostitution, which were seen as deviant, rather than criminal. These changing attitudes may partly explain the witch hunts that occurred after the Reformation and in which women were the largest group of victims.

=== Popular religion ===
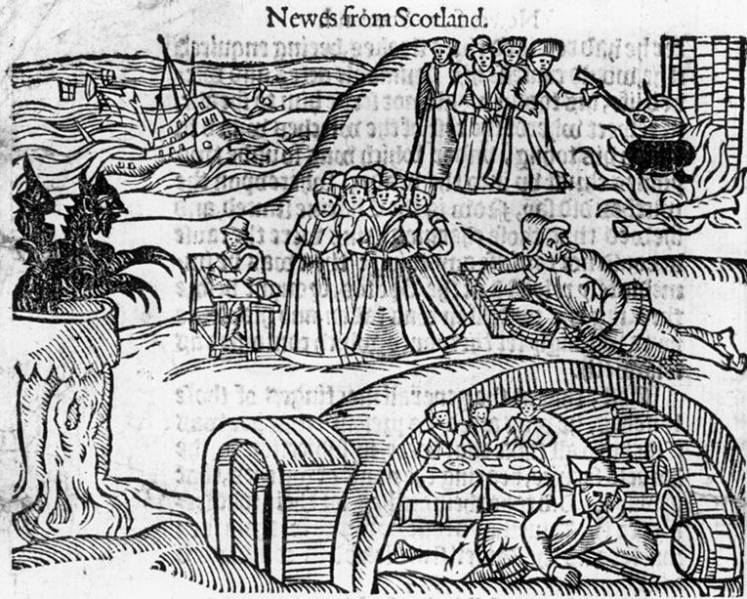
The North Berwick Witches meet the Devil in the local kirkyard, from a contemporary pamphlet, Newes from Scotland

Scottish Protestantism was focused on the Bible, which was seen as infallible and the major source of moral authority. Many Bibles were large, illustrated and highly valuable objects. The Genevan translation was commonly used until in 1611 the Kirk adopted the Authorised King James Version and the first Scots version was printed in Scotland in 1633, but the Geneva Bible continued to be employed into the 17th century. Bibles often became the subject of superstitions, being used in divination. Kirk discipline was fundamental to Reformed Protestantism and it probably reached a high-water mark in the 17th century. Kirk sessions were able to apply religious sanctions, such as excommunication and denial of baptism, to enforce godly behaviour and obedience. In more difficult cases of immoral behaviour they could work with the local magistrate, in a system modelled on that employed in Geneva. Public occasions were treated with mistrust and from the later 17th century there were efforts by kirk sessions to stamp out activities such as well-dressing, bonfires, guising, penny weddings, and dancing.

In the late Middle Ages there were a handful of prosecutions for harm done through witchcraft, but the passing of the Witchcraft Act 1563 made witchcraft, or consulting with witches, capital crimes. The first major series of trials under the new act were the North Berwick witch trials, beginning in 1589, in which James VI played a major part as "victim" and investigator. He became interested in witchcraft and published a defence of witch-hunting in the Daemonologie in 1597, but he appears to have become increasingly sceptical and eventually took steps to limit prosecutions. An estimated 4,000 to 6,000 people, mostly from the Scottish Lowlands, were tried for witchcraft in this period, a much higher rate than for neighbouring England. There were major series of trials in 1590–1591, 1597, 1628–1631, 1649–1650 and 1661–1662. Seventy-five per cent of the accused were women and modern estimates indicate that over 1,500 people were executed.

=== National identity ===
The Kirk that developed after 1560 came to represent all of Scotland. It became the subject of national pride, and was often compared with the less clearly reformed church in neighbouring England. Jane Dawson suggests that the loss of national standing in the contest for dominance of Britain between England and France suffered by the Scots, may have led them to stress their religious achievements. A theology developed that saw the kingdom as in a covenant relationship with God. Many Scots saw their country as a new Israel and themselves as a holy people engaged in a struggle between the forces of Christ and Antichrist, the latter being identified with the resurgent papacy and the Roman Catholic Church. This view was reinforced by events elsewhere that demonstrated that Reformed religion was under threat, such as the 1572 Massacre of St Bartholomew in France and the Spanish Armada in 1588. These views were popularised through the first Protestant histories, such as Knox's History of the Reformation and George Buchanan's Rerum Scoticarum Historia. This period also saw a growth of a patriotic literature facilitated by the rise of popular printing. Published editions of medieval poetry by John Barbour and Robert Henryson and the plays of David Lyndsay all gained a new audience.

== See also ==
- English Reformation
- History of Christianity in Scotland
- History of Scotland
