= Lords of the Congregation =

16th-century Scottish nobles in support of the Protestant Reformation

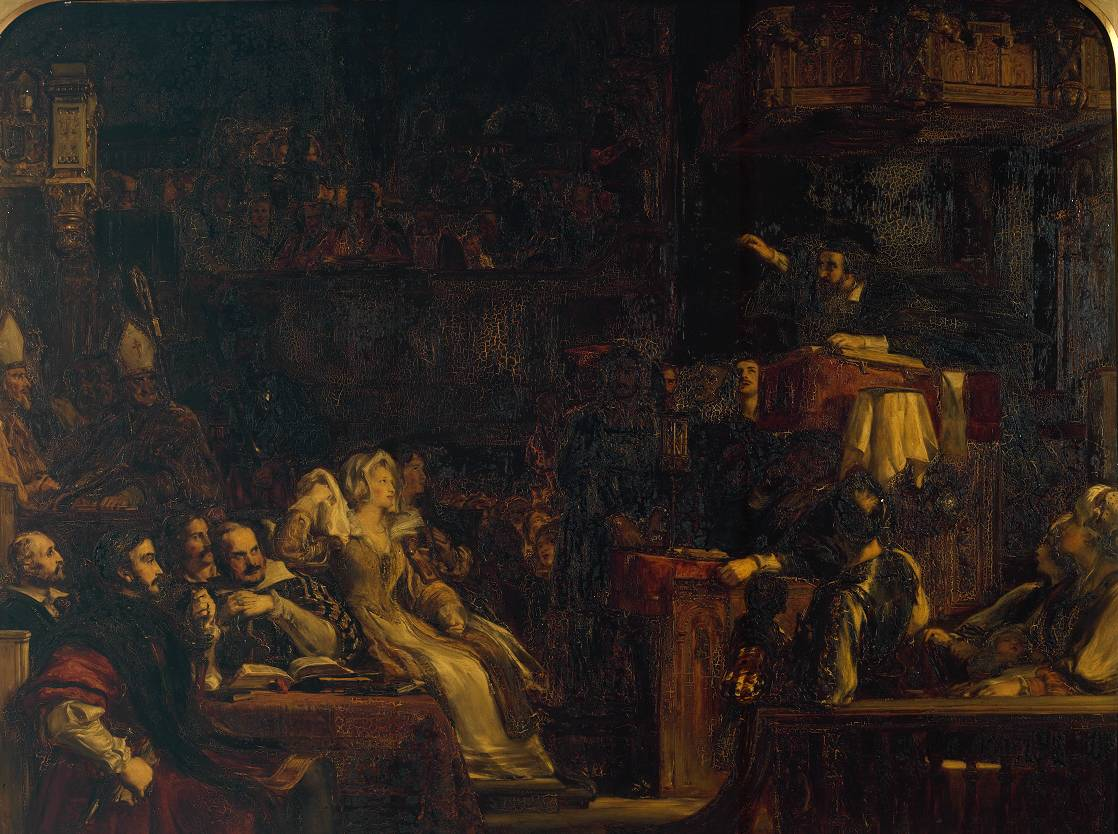
The Preaching of John Knox before the Lords of the Congregation, 10th June 1559 (David Wilkie, 1832)

The Lords of the Congregation (Scots: Lairds o the Congregatioun), originally styling themselves the Faithful, were a group of Protestant Scottish nobles who in the mid-16th century favoured a reformation of the Catholic church according to Protestant principles and a Scottish-English alliance. The Confederate Lords were nobles who opposed Queen Mary I, after she married the Earl of Bothwell.

== Historical events ==
In December 1557 a group of Scottish lords opposed the marriage of Mary, Queen of Scots to the Dauphin of France (who became King Francis II of France from 1559 to 1560). The group signed the "First Band" or Covenant to work to make Scotland Protestant. The initial members were the Earl of Argyll, his brother Colin Campbell, the Earl of Glencairn, the Earl of Morton, and John Erskine of Dun, though others, such as William Douglas of Whittinghame quickly followed.

Following religious riots in Perth, the Lords gained support and provided military help to John Knox in opposing the troops of Mary of Guise, who was the Regent of Scotland. They wrote letters to the French commanders, Henri Cleutin, and to Mary of Guise outlining their case on 22 May. The letter for Mary of Guise was placed on the cushion of her seat in the Chapel Royal of Stirling Castle. She found it and tucked it discreetly into the pocket of her gown.

In June, at Cupar Muir, in Fife, the Lords fielded enough military strength to face off a French and Scottish army jointly led by the Duke of Châtelherault (who as Regent had supported the French match) and by Henri Cleutin, the French king's lieutenant. By July 1559 the Lords of the Congregation had taken Edinburgh. As Edinburgh Castle held out against them, the Lords withdrew under the terms of the truce of the Articles of Leith (25 July 1559).

In September, Châtelherault, now joined by his son, the Earl of Arran, changed sides and became leader of the Congregation Lords. On 21 October 1559, the Lords issued a proclamation that Guise was no longer regent and should issue no more coins.

Mary of Guise, who had earlier offered a degree of religious tolerance, maintained that their motives were secular in part. Queen Mary and King Francis wrote to her in November 1559, declaring that the lords were acting maliciously under the name and cloak of religion. French re-inforcements pushed the Lords and their Protestant army back to Stirling and Fife.

By the Treaty of Berwick in February 1560 the Lords brought in an English army to resist the French troops. The armed conflict now centred on the Siege of Leith. After the death of the Queen Regent in June and the conclusion of hostilities at Leith by the Treaty of Edinburgh in July, the Scottish Reformation took effect in the Parliament of Scotland in August 1560.

=== Personnel ===
William Kirkcaldy of Grange and John Knox gave a list of members of the Congregation who expelled the troops of Mary of Guise from Perth in June 1559 and moved on Edinburgh, including:

- Archibald Campbell, 5th Earl of Argyll
- James Stewart, Prior of St Andrews, later to become Regent Moray
- Andrew Leslie, 5th Earl of Rothes
- John Graham, 4th Earl of Menteith
- Patrick Ruthven, 3rd Lord Ruthven
- James Ogilvy, 5th Lord Ogilvy of Airlie
- David, 2nd Lord Drummond
- Patrick Lindsay, Master of Lindsay
- William Douglas, Laird of Lochleven
- John Wishart, Laird of Pitarro
- William Murray, Laird of Tullibardine
- Colin Campbell, Laird of Glenorchy.

These were joined in Edinburgh in July 1559 by: Alexander Cunningham, Earl of Glencairn; the Earl of Morton; Lord Erskine; Robert, Lord Boyd; Lord Ochiltree; Hugh Campbell, Sheriff of Ayr; and the Laird of Calder.

Knox and Kirkcaldy gave the names of another six lords who had not yet declared their alliance in July 1559; William Keith, 4th Earl Marischal; the Earl of Athol; Lord Forbes; and James Douglas, Laird of Drumlanrig; the Laird of Lochinvar; and the Laird of Garlies.

A list of the council for policy of the Lords of October 1559 includes; the former Regent Arran; his son the 3rd Earl of Arran; the Earl of Argyll; the Prior of St Andrews; the Earl of Glencairn; Lord Ruthven; Robert, 4th Lord Boyd; Lord Maxwell; Erskine of Dun; Wishart of Pitarrow; Henry Balnaves of Halhill; Kirkcaldy of Grange; and James Halyburton Provost of Dundee.

The congregation received guidance in religious matters from:

- Alexander Gordon, Bishop of Galloway
- John Knox
- Master Christopher Goodman of England
- John Willock.

== Manifesto and rhetoric ==
Several letters and bonds signed by the Lords set out and justify their aims. A letter sent to enlist the help of George Hay, Earl of Erroll, Hereditary Constable of Scotland, written 24 January 1560 focused on their secular goal to expel the French garrisons and justifies their request for English military support. The letter fell into French hands and would have been used against them;

We wrote ... how we were handled and suppressed by strangers and already invaded by fire and sword for the debating of the true ministry of God's word and liberty of this realm, which as we may see is now taken effect in the most cruel and ungodly manner by the fortifying of the principal port of this realm (Leith) and the intended fortification of St Andrews
And they have in their progress used such cruelty on those that gave them most credit and were assured by them that all others may take example, And yet they intend no less than to bring us, if God will permit them, to most wild slavery and bondage and to make plain conquest under a coloured authority to the utter extermination of us and our posterity
And because we saw them continue in their unjust persecution and our force is so small to resist their tyranny we thought good to seek support of our neighbours of England, which they have granted to us as may now be manifestly seen by the army already come by sea, and by the land host that will march on the day appointed.

This letter was signed by James Hamilton the former Regent, Argyll, Glencairn, Rothes, Ruthven, Menteith and Boyd.

== Confederate Lords and Mary, Queen of Scots ==
The Scottish lords who opposed Mary, Queen of Scots, in 1567 when she was abducted by the Earl of Bothwell and then married him are known as the Confederate Lords. She had been to Stirling Castle and was taken to Dunbar Castle by Bothwell. On 1 May 1567, a "Bond for the Queen's Safety" was signed at Stirling by the Earls of Atholl, Argyll, Mar, Morton, Sir John Graham, and William Murray of Tullibardine. Some of these had previously signed the Ainslie Tavern Bond in support of Bothwell of marrying the queen. The wedding was held at Holyrood Palace on 15 May. Another band made after the wedding attracted more supporters to this group, and made an offer to Bothwell's ally James Balfour to surrender Edinburgh Castle to them.

The Earl of Morton, Lord Home, and the Earl of Mar met at Liberton Kirk on 10 June 1567. The next day the Lords entered Edinburgh and laid siege to Borthwick Castle south of the city. Mary and Bothell were defeated by the Confederate Lords at the battle of Carberry Hill. After Mary escaped from Lochleven Castle, she was again defeated by the Confederate Lords at the battle of Langside. The personnel of Mary's following, the Congregation, and the Confederate Lords were explored by Gordon Donaldson in his All the Queen's men: Power and Politics in Mary Stewart's Scotland (1983).

The Confederate Lords issued three key proclamations responding to the crises of June 1567, which were printed in Edinburgh by Robert Lekprevik as single sided broadsides or broadsheets suitable for public display. The first, declaring martial law, was printed on 11 June when the Lords entered Edinburgh and laid siege to Borthwick Castle. The second, on 12 June, condemned the Earl of Bothwell. The third, published on 26 June, called for the capture of Bothwell after the battle of Carberry Hill. The texts of these proclamations was also copied into the register of the Privy Council of Scotland.
