= Fairyland =

Mythical land of fairies in British folklore

In folklore, Fairyland or Faerie (Note: Faerie is an archaic spelling of fairy, often used in the sense "fays collectively" or "realm of fays". This was the original meaning of the word fairy, which derives from fay and the suffix -ery (compare nunnery, rookery, Jewry, etc.). It later came to be used to denote an individual fay, and has now largely replaced the latter word in English.) is a fabulous land inhabited by fays or fairies. It may be ruled by a Fairy Queen. In Scottish contexts, it is also known as Elfame.

== In Scots texts ==
Records of the Scottish witch trials reveal that many initiates claimed to have had congress with the "Queen of Elfame" and her retinue. On November 8, 1576, midwife Bessie Dunlop, a resident of Dalry, Scotland, was accused of sorcery and witchcraft. She admitted to her accusers that she had received tuition from Thomas Reid, a former barony officer who had died at the Battle of Pinkie 30 years earlier, and from the queen of the "Court of Elfame" that lay nearby. She was ultimately convicted and burned at the stake.

Allison Peirson, of Byre Hills, Fife, was burned as a witch in 1588 for conversing with the Queen of Elfame and for prescribing magic charms and potions. The same woman is featured in a 1583 ballad by Robert Sempill, in which she is said to have been in a fairy-ride. Sempill's piece mentions "Elphyne", glossed as "Elfland" or "Fairyland".

In Thomas the Rhymer, a medieval verse romance and ballad, the title character is spirited away by a female supernatural being. Although identified by commentators as the Queen of Fairies, the texts refrain from specifically naming her or her domain except in ballad version A, in which she is referred to as the Queen of Elfland. Poet and novelist Robert Graves published an alteration of the ballad, naming her as the "Queen of Elphame":

I'm not the Queen of Heaven, Thomas,
That name does not belong to me;
I am but the Queen of fair Elphame
Come out to hunt in my follie.

Elfhame or Elfland is portrayed in various ways in these ballads and stories, most commonly as mystical and benevolent but sometimes as sinister and wicked. The mysteriousness of the land and its otherworldly powers are a source of skepticism and distrust in many tales. Additional journeys to the realm include the fairy tale "Childe Rowland", which presents a particularly negative view of the land.

== See also ==
- Otherworld
- Seelie
- Tír na nÓg
- Paristan
- Feywild (Dungeons & Dragons)

== Bibliography ==
- Henderson, Lizanne; Cowan, Edward J. (2001). Scottish Fairy Belief: A History. Dundrun. ISBN 9781862321908.
- Pitcairn, Robert, ed. (1833a). Ancient Criminal Trials in Scotland. Vol. 1, part 1. Bannatyne Club.
- Pitcairn, Robert, ed. (1833b). Ancient Criminal Trials in Scotland. Vol. 1, part 3.
- Sempill, Robert (1891). "Poem 45, v.372". In Cranstoun, James (ed.). Satirical Poems of the Time of the Reformation. Vol. 1. William Blackwell and Sons for the Scottish Text Society.
