= Queen of Elphame =

Folkloric being

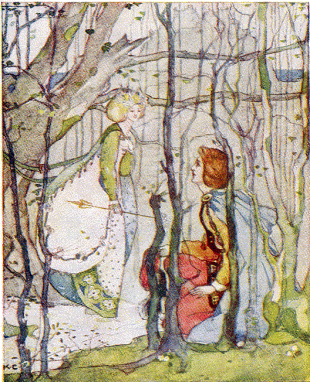
From Thomas the Rhymer, "Under the Eildon tree Thomas met the lady," illustrated by Katharine Cameron

Queen of Elphame or "Elf-hame" (-hame stem only occurs in conjectural reconstructed orthography), in the folklore belief of Lowland Scotland and Northern England, designates the elfin queen of Faerie, mentioned in Scottish witch trials. In ballads and contemporary texts, she is referred to as Queen of Elphane, Elphen, or the Fairies. She is equivalent to the Queen of Fairy who rules Faërie or Fairyland. The character as described in witch trials has many parallels with the legends of Thomas the Rhymer and Tam Lin.

== History of usage ==
The actual text spelling is "Quene of Elfame" and other variants in the witch trial transcripts. The supposition of a -hame stem, leading to the etymological meaning "Elf-home" in the Scots language, is speculative on the part of Robert Pitcairn, the modern editor. (Note: Note that Pitcairn he appends a question mark in one footnote (I, 162) but none in the other (I, 53).) The Dictionary of the Older Scottish Tongue lists only the Elfame and elphyne spellings, both defined as "Fairyland". Other spellings include: "Quene of Elphane" and "Court of Elfane" (accused witch Alison Pearson), "Court of Elfame" (Bessie Dunlop), "Queen of Elphen" (Andro Man).

The "Queen of Elphame" designation was only used in isolated instances in the 19th century. (Note: In Pitcairn's index, cross-referencing to I, 52, 56 (Bessie Dunlop case) and I, 162 (Alison Pearson); and later in regards to Andro Man by Chambers's Journal) Serious scholarship on Thomas the Rhymer, for instance, generally do not employ this spelling. But it was embraced by Robert Graves who used "Queen of Elphame" in his works. Usage has since spread in various popular publications.

The theory that the queen whom Thomas Rhymer met at Erceldoune was the Saxon goddess Ercel, i.e. Hörsel or Ursel (cf. St. Ursula) according to a German origin explanation noted in passing by Fiske (Note: Fiske explained Erceldoune was ("Hörsel-Hill"), alluding to the Hörsel or Ursel, a goddess who Baring-Gould proposed was the archetype of St. Ursula.) though it has received scarce notice aside from Barbara G. Walker, who cites Graves's The White Goddess for this insight.

== Witch trials ==
The Queen of Elphame was invoked, under various names, in Scottish witch trials. The forms "Queen of Elfame" (sic.) ("Elphane", also "Court of Elfane") occur in documents from the trial of Alison Pearson (Alesoun Peirsoun) in 1588, and emendation to "elf-hame" was suggested by the editor, Robert Pitcairn. Alison was carried off to Elfame on a number of occasions over the years, where she made good acquaintance with the Queen. But rather than the Queen herself, it was mostly with her elfin minions that Alice engaged in specific interactions, with William Simpson, Alison's cousin or uncle being a particularly close-knitted mentor, teaching her medicinal herbs and the art of healing, which she then profited from by peddling her remedies to her patients, which included the Bishop of St. Andrews. The elfin folk from this world would arrive unexpectedly, allowing her to join in their herb-picking before sunrise, and brewing their salves (sawis) before her eyes. But they were often abusive, striking her in a manner that left her bereft of all her powers ("poistee" or "poustie") on her sides, rendering her bedridden for twenty weeks at a time.

The form "Queen of Elphen" occurs in the 1598 witchcraft trial indictment (ditty) and confession of Andro Man (Andrew Man) of Aberdeen. Andro Man confessed that as a boy he saw "the Devil" his master "in the likeness and shape of a woman, whom [he] callest the Queen of Elphen," and as an adult, during the span of some thirty-two years he had carnal relations with the "Quene of Elphen" on whom he begat many bairns. Further down however, the Devil whom he calls "Christsonday" is the goodman (husband), though "the Quene has grip of all the craft".

Andro Man further confessed that on the Holy Rood Day (Ruidday in harvest) the Queen of Elphen and her company rode white horses (quhyt haiknayes) alongside the Devil (Christsondy) who appeared out of snow in the form of a stag. She and her companions had human shapes, "yet were as shadows", and that they were "playing and dancing whenever they pleased."

Bessie Dunlop in 1576 confessed that the dead man's spirit she had congress with (Thom Reid) was one of "the good neighbours or brownies, who dwelt at the Court of Faery (Elf-hame)" ("gude wychtis that wynnitin the Court of Elfame.."), and they had come to take her away, but she refused to comply thereby angering Thom. When interrogated, Bessie denied having carnal relations with Thom, though he once took her by the apron and "wald haif had hir gangand with him to Elfame." Bessie was informed that the queen had secretly visited her before, and according to Thom, when Bessie lay in bed in child-birth, it was the "Quene of Elfame" who in the guise of a stout woman had offered her a drink and prophesied her child's death and her husband's cure. And indeed, it was at the behest of this Queen who was his master that Thom had come to Bessie at all.

The Queen's shape-shifting magic extends to her own person. Andro Man's confession also noted that "she can be old or young as she pleases".

Marion Grant, of the same coven as Andro Man, witnessed the queen as a "fine woman, clad in a white walicot." (Note: A walicot is a woman's undershirt or petticoat.) Similarly, Isobel Gowdie's confession described the "Qwein of Fearrie" as handsomely ("brawlie") clothed in white linen and in white and brown clothes, and that providing more food than Isobel could eat.

Robert Sempill in a ballad (1583) on the bishop Patrick Adamson refers to Alison Pearson participating in the fairy ride. The Dictionary of the Older Scottish Tongue also, in giving the entry Elphyne "Fairy-land," and gives Sempill's ballad as an example in usage. (Note: The DOST (Dictionary of the Older Scottish Tongue) cites year 1583 for "Sempill Sat. P. xlv. 372", i.e., Robert Sempill (1891). Cranstoun, James (ed.). Satirical Poems of the Time of the Reformation. Vol. 1. William Blackwell and Sons for the Scottish Text Society. p. 365. (Poem 45, v. 372).)

For oght the kirk culd him fobid, He sped him sone, and gat the thrid; Ane carling of the Quene of Phareis, That ewill win geir to elphyne careis; Through all Braid Abane scho hes bene, On horsbak on Hallow ewin; And ay in seiking cetayne nyghtis, As scho sayis with sur [our] sillie wychtis. — R.S., 'Legend of the Bischop of St. Androis Lyfe, callit Mr Patrick Adamsone alias Cousteane", Poems 16th Cent. in: Scottish Poems of the XVIth Century, pp. 320–321 (Note: Text given is as quoted by Jamieson)

Robert Jamieson also noted the ballad under the etymological explanation of seelie meaning "happy." The ballad thus mention the Queen of Fairies, elphyne meaning Elfland (Fairyland), and seelie witches in a single passage.

In 1801, John Leyden identified the Scottish queen of the fairies with Nicneven, the "gyre-carlin," or Hecate. This was accepted by authors such as Sir Walter Scott, but has baffled later scholars; Nicneven is, properly, a witch in the 16th-century poetry of Alexander Montgomerie. She is a worshipper of Hecate and a separate person from the "Elfe Queene," who also appears in the poem.

== Ballads ==
A similar queen appears in the legend of Thomas the Rhymer, where she spirits Thomas away. In the older prose romance she is the queen of some unnamed supernatural realm; in a later ballad (version A), she identifies herself as "Queen of Elfland." In both the ballad and romance versions, she is initially mistaken for the Queen of Heaven (i.e. the Virgin Mary). Even in versions where her realm is not directly named, scholars such as J. A. H. Murray identify it as Elfland or Fairyland. In a 1957 edition, Robert Graves rendered the name as Queen of Elphame.

There are parallels from this ballad to the witchcraft trial of Andro Man. Man's accusers charged that he had learned the art of healing from the "Quene of Elphen" and worked in exchange for "meit or deit", just like Thomas the Rhymer. They also made him confess that he had known dead men like Thomas the Rhymer.

Furthermore, the "fee" or "teind" to hell in the romance version of the Legend of Thomas the Rhymer is also mentioned in the ballad of Tam Lin and in the historical witchcraft trial of Alison Pearson in 1586. (Note: Commonality between the Rhymer's romance and "Tam Lin".) (Note: Greenwood variant; referred to as "E" version by later scholars such as Emily B. Lyle.)

True Thomas lay oer yond grassy bank,
And he beheld a ladie gay,
A ladie that was brisk and bold,
Come riding oer the fernie brae.
...

True Thomas he took off his hat,
And bowed him low down till his knee:
“All hail, thou mighty Queen of Heaven!
For your peer on earth I never did see.”

“O no, O no, True Thomas,” she says,
“That name does not belong to me;
I am but the queen of fair Elfland,
And I’m come here for to visit thee.
—"Thomas Rymer", Child's Ballad #37A

Thomas lay on Huntlie bank,
A-spying ferlies with his ee,
And he did espy a lady bold
Come riding down from the eldern tree
...

Thomas took off both cloak and cap,
And bowed him low down till his knee,
'O save you, save you, Queen of Heaven,
For your peer on earth I ne'er did see!'

'I'm not the Queen of Heaven, Thomas,
That name does not belong to me;
I am but the Queen of fair Elphame
Come out to hunt in my follie.
—Robert Graves's version, "Thomas the Rymer"

The "Queen o' Fairies" appears in Tam Lin as a more sinister figure who captures mortal men and entertains them in her subterranean home, but then uses them to pay a "teind to Hell":

'And ance it fell upon a day,
A cauld day and a snell,
When we were frae the hunting come,
That frae my horse I fell,
The Queen o' Fairies she caught me,
In yon green hill do dwell.

"And pleasant is the fairy land,
But, an eerie tale to tell,
Ay at the end of seven years,
We pay a tiend to hell,
I am sae fair and fu o flesh,
I'm feard it be myself.
—;"Tam Lin", Child's Ballad #39A, str.23–24

== See also ==
- Álfheimr – Homeland of elves in Norse mythology
- Border ballads
- Elf
- Fairy Queen
- Fairy
- Otherworld
- Classifications of fairies
