= Janet Boyman =

Scottish woman executed for witchcraft in 1572

Janet Boyman (died 1572), also known as Jonet Boyman or Janet Bowman, (Note: Ronald Hutton and others, such as the Survey of Scottish Witchcraft Database, list her as Janet Boyman; Henderson refers to her as Jonet Boyman, which is the form used in the criminal records, but Janet Bowman is a further variation.) was a Scottish woman accused of witchcraft; she was tried and executed in 1572 although the case against her was started in 1570. Her indictment has been described by modern-day scholars, such as Lizanne Henderson, as the earliest and most comprehensive record of witchcraft and fairy belief in Scotland.

== Accusations of witchcraft ==
Janet Boyman lived in the Cowgate of Edinburgh, and was said to have been from Ayrshire. She was married to William Steill. In early modern Scotland married women did not change their surnames.

Boyman was identified as "Dame Steill" in the trial of accused witch and conspirator William Stewart of Luthrie. She was alleged to have predicted the escape of Mary, Queen of Scots from Lochleven Castle in 1568 and the death of Regent Moray who was assassinated in January 1570, and her accusation was the first to be made in connection with a political conspiracy.

She told her interrogators that she made contact with the supernatural world at a well on the south side of Arthur's Seat, a hill close to Edinburgh. There she conjured spirits who would help her heal others. Sometimes she worked cures by washing the patients's shirt at the well at St Leonards.

She was condemned as:

ane wyss woman that culd mend diverss seikness and bairnis that are tane away with fairyie men and wemen
a wise woman that could heal diverse illnesses and children taken away by fairy men and women.

Jonet Boyman was executed on 29 December 1572.

== Personal life ==
There is little information available concerning Boyman's personal life; however the trial record shows her as living in Cowgate, a street in Edinburgh. No indication is given of her age but she was married to William Steill.
