= Andrew Man =

Healer burnt as a witch

Andrew Man (sometimes spelt Andro Man) was a cunning man and healer in Aberdeen who was tried as a witch in 1597, when an old man, and burnt in 1598. He said that his powers came from the Queen of Elphame – a fairy queen with whom he had regularly consorted. His story is notable as an example of a male witch who was believed to have had a sexual relationship with a supernatural entity - in the case of female witches, they were typically believed to have consorted with the Devil, whereas Man claimed to have sexual relations with a local folkloric fairy queen.

== Trial and testimony ==
Man claimed to have first met the fairy queen as a boy, when in return for his kindness to her, she bestowed him with healing powers. After meeting her again as an adult, Man claimed that the two became lovers. Man did develop a reputation of being a healer among his neighbours.

At his trial, Man described scenes reminiscent of the contemporary conception of a Witches' Sabbath, feasting and dancing with half-man, half-stag beings.

Scottish belief in fairies and other folkloric supernatural beings was interpreted by the Inquisitors as evidence of consort with demons. Little distinction was made by the Church between different types of magics. Court trials in the late 16th century Scotland record testimony by the accused declaring their powers to be fairy-derived and others claimed to have long-term relationships. According to Andrew Man he had fathered children with the Fairy Queen in his 1598 confessional.
