= Fairy Queen =

Figure from Irish and British folklore, believed to rule the fairies

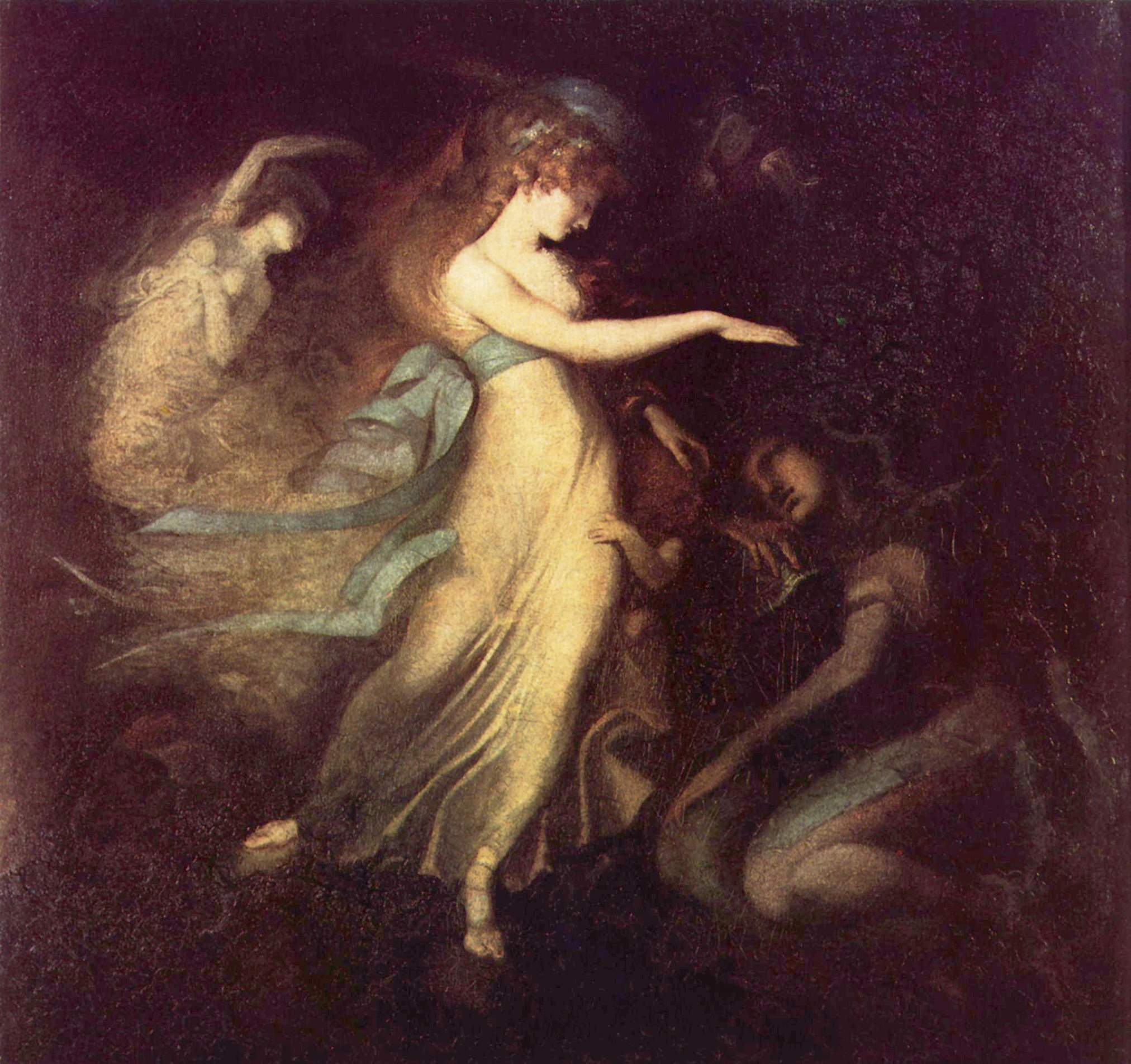
Prince Arthur and the Fairy Queen by Johann Heinrich Füssli, c. 1788

In folklore and literature, the Fairy Queen or Queen of the Fairies is a female ruler of the fairies, sometimes but not always paired with a king. Depending on the work, she may be named or unnamed; Titania and Mab are two frequently used names. Numerous characters, goddesses or folkloric spirits worldwide have been labeled as Fairy Queens.

== Folklore ==
The Tuatha Dé Danann and the Daoine Sidhe of Irish mythology had numerous local kings and queens. Oonagh, Una or Nuala was the wife of Finvarra or Fionnbharr, the fairy king of western Ireland, although he frequently took other lovers. She was usually described living with Finvarra in his hill Cnoc Meadha but was sometimes said to have a separate residence in Cnoc Sidh Una (Knockshegouna). In one story following the model of the Fairies' Midwife (Aarne-Thompson type 476), "Fionnbharr's wife" (unnamed) is thoughtlessly cursed by a human girl who must then serve as her midwife. Fionnbharr's wife attempts revenge by giving the girl a belt that will cut her in two when she puts it on, but a fairy servant warns the girl in time. Other Irish fairy queens included Clíodhna of Munster, Aibhell and Ainé.

The Arthurian character of Morgan le Fey (or Morgan of the Fairies) ruled the supernatural island of Avalon and was sometimes depicted as a fairy queen. In the Vita Merlini, she is Morgen, the chief of nine magical sister queens.

Fairy queens appear in some of the Child Ballads. A kind and helpful fairy queen features in Alison Gross (Child 35), and a terrible and deadly fairy queen is the antagonist of Tam Lin (Child 39). Tam Lin's Fairy Queen pays a tithe to Hell every seven years, and Tam Lin fears that he will be forced to serve as a human sacrifice:

At the end of seven years
She pays a tithe to Hell
I so fair and full of flesh
I fear it be myself

An unnamed fairy queen appears in Thomas the Rhymer (Child 37), where she takes the titular character as her lover and leaves him with prophetic abilities. Although the romances and ballads associated with Thomas the Rhymer have parallels to Tam Lin, including the tithe to Hell, this fairy queen is a more benevolent figure.

In Thomas Cheyne's rebellion in January 1450, "the King of Fairies" (Regem de ffeyre) and "The Queen of Fairies" (Reginam de ffeyre) were among the aliases used by the (male) leaders.

Goodwin Wharton, a 17th-century English politician and mystic, believed that he had married a fairy queen, named Penelope La Gard.

There were numerous local beliefs of fairy queens, some of whom had proper names. A charm from the Isle of Man names the fairy rulers as King Philip and Queen Bahee. One Welsh folk informant stated that the queen of the Tylwyth Teg was Gwenhidw, wife of Gwydion ab Don, and small, fleecy clouds were her sheep.

Some of these local beliefs influenced literature. "Old Moss the fairy queen" appears in Shantooe Jest, a 19th-century poem by Thomas Shaw inspired by Yorkshire and Lancashire folklore. She flees the sound of the church bells to live with a giant named Todmore and they eventually settle in the location of Todmorden. Janet or Gennet, a legendary spirit associated with a waterfall called Janet's Foss in the Yorkshire Dales, was romanticized as a fairy queen by non-local writers and poets. Joan the Wad was a Cornish queen of the piskeys, made famous in a marketing campaign in the early 1900s. According to John Leyden in 1801, the Scottish fairy queen was called Nicneven, the Gyre-Carling, or Hecate. Later scholarship has disputed this; Nicneven's earliest known appearance was in Alexander Montgomerie's Flyting (c. 1580) as a witch and worshiper of Hecate, and a separate character from the Elf Queen.

Equivalents appear across the world. In modern Greek folklore, Lamia is queen of the Nereids and Artemis is queen of the mountains and land-nymphs. A Romani legend describes Ana, queen of the Keshali nymphs, who was abducted by a demon.

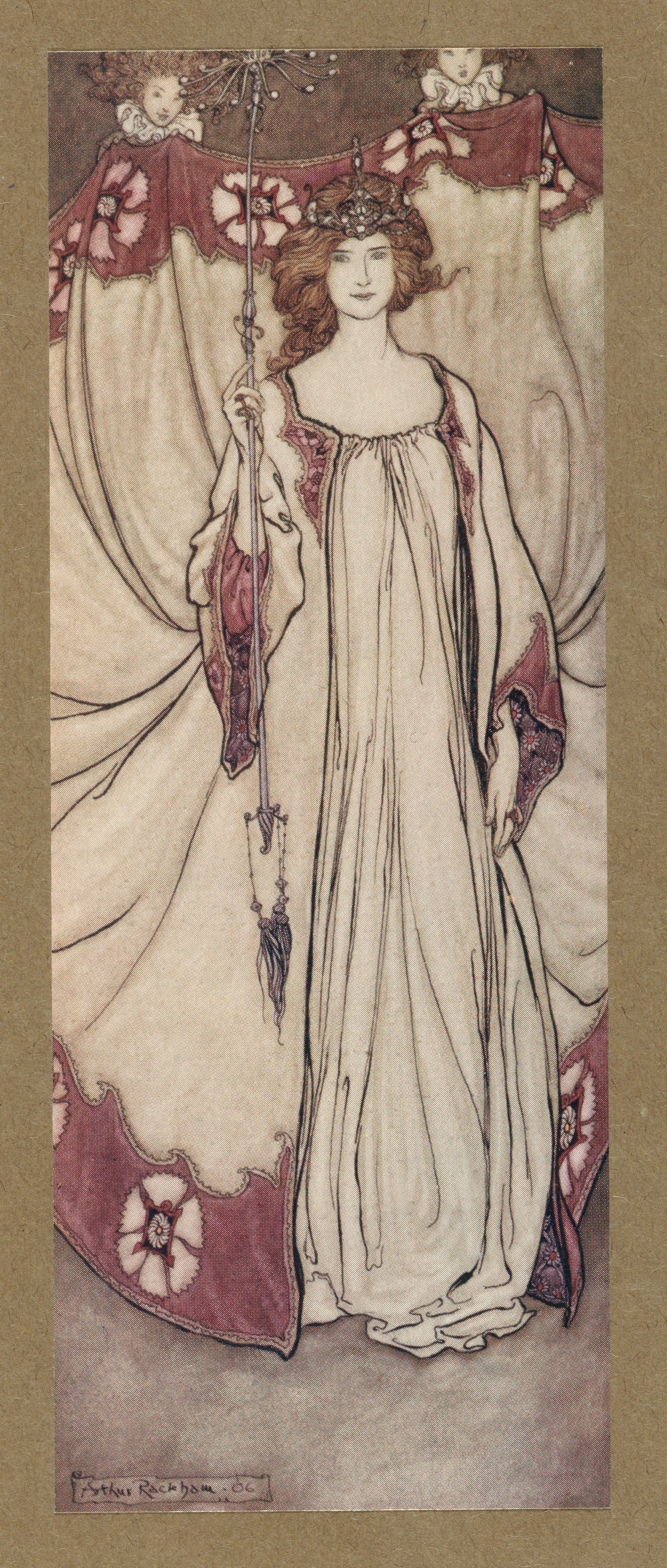
Arthur Rackham - Queen Mab

== Literature and media ==
In "The Merchant's Tale", by Geoffrey Chaucer, Pluto and Proserpine are described as the king and queen of the fairies. This depiction is thought to have influenced William Shakespeare's fairy rulers in A Midsummer Night's Dream.

The fairy queen Gloriana, daughter of King Oberon, is the titular character of the allegorical epic poem The Faerie Queene by Edmund Spenser. She is also called Tanaquill, derived from the name of the wife of Tarquinius Priscus. She is a virtuous ruler written as an allegorical depiction of Queen Elizabeth I.

William Shakespeare referred multiple times to the figure of a fairy queen. The Merry Wives of Windsor makes reference to the concept. In A Midsummer Night's Dream, Titania is the queen of the fairies and wife of King Oberon. Her name is derived from Ovid as an epithet of the Roman goddess Diana. In Romeo and Juliet, the character of Queen Mab does not appear but is described; she is the fairies' midwife, who rides in a tiny chariot and brings dreams to humans.

Later, authors such as Ben Jonson and Michael Drayton also named the fairy queen as Mab. Drayton named Mab, not Titania, as Oberon's wife. Aside from Titania and Mab, Oberon was sometimes depicted with wives of other names: Aureola in a 1591 entertainment given for Queen Elizabeth at Elvetham in Hampshire, and Chloris in William Percy's The Faery Pastorall around 1600.

Fairies and their society often played a major role in the French contes de fées. The fairies are ruled by a queen in Gabrielle-Suzanne Barbot de Villeneuve's Beauty and the Beast, and in several of Madame D'Aulnoy's tales, such as The Princess Mayblossom. In Charlotte-Rose de Caumont de La Force's Fairer-than-a-Fairy, the villain is a wicked fairy queen named Nabote who replaced the previous, good queen. D'Aulnoy, who popularized the genre and the term "fairy tale", was nicknamed "la reine de la féerie".

=== Modern literature ===
In The Little White Bird, the predecessor to Peter Pan, author J. M. Barrie identifies Queen Mab as the name of the benign and helpful fairy queen. In Disney's series of films based on Tinker Bell, branching out from their adaptation of Peter Pan, the fairy ruler is Queen Clarion.

In L. Frank Baum's Oz books, Queen Lurline is an otherworldly fairy queen who played a role in the creation of the Land of Oz. An unnamed Queen of the Fairies also features in Baum's book The Life and Adventures of Santa Claus, and is named Lulea in Baum's Queen Zixi of Ix.

In Brandon Mull's Fablehaven series, the Fairy Queen is an essential part of the plot. Although she rules over the fairies, she is actually a unicorn capable of taking humanoid form.

The character Erza Scarlet from Hiro Mashima's Fairy Tail earned the alias "Titania" due to her power.

In Foxglove Summer, part of the Rivers of London series, the protagonist Peter Grant is captured by the Fairy Queen and taken off to her Kingdom (an alternative reality or Otherworld where Britain is still covered with a massive unbroken primeval forest, with no sign of the familiar towns and villages).

In Julie Kagawa's Iron Fey series, Titania and Mab are rival queens of the Summer and Winter Courts. Oberon's half-human daughter, Meghan Chase, eventually becomes queen of the Iron Court.

Diana Wynne Jones's Fire and Hemlock is a modern reimagining of the ballads of Tam Lin and Thomas the Rhymer, in which the Fairy Queen is known as Mrs Laurel Perry Lynn.

== Witchcraft and neopaganism ==
The goddess Diana was regularly portrayed as the ruler of the fairy kingdom in demonological literature, such as King James VI of Scotland's Daemonologie, which says that she belongs to "the fourth kind of spirits, which by the Gentiles [non-Jews] was called Diana and her wandering court, and amongst us is called Fairy (as I told you) or our good neighbours".

Medieval Christian authorities condemned cult beliefs of nocturnal, female spirit leaders who might accept offerings or take practitioners on a nighttime journey. The Sicilian doñas de fuera of Italy were one example. In Scotland in the 1530s, William Hay described Scottish witches meeting with "seely wights" or "Diana queen of the fairies". Julian Goodare clarifies, "There is no reason to believe that there was a Scottish cult of Diana". Rather, the name was contemporary authorities' way of classifying such beliefs. Some of the names used for that figure were Herodias, Abundia, Bensozia, Richella, and Satia. like Doamna Zînelor in Romania (translated by Mircea Eliade as "Queen of the Fairies") or Wanne Thekla in the Netherlands.

A queen of the fairies or spirits, referred to as the "Quene of Elfame", including spelling variants, was mentioned in several Scottish witch trials. In the 16th century, Andro Man claimed to have had children by the "Quene of Elphen". The scholar Robert Pitcairn reconstructed the word as "Elphame" or "Elf-hame".

The concept of a Dianic queen of spirits influenced the neopagan cultures that developed from Charles Godfrey Leland's concept of Aradia "Queen of the Witches". The Faerie faith developed from the same source as the McFarland Dianic tradition.
