= Jack-o'-lantern =

Carved pumpkin or root vegetable lantern

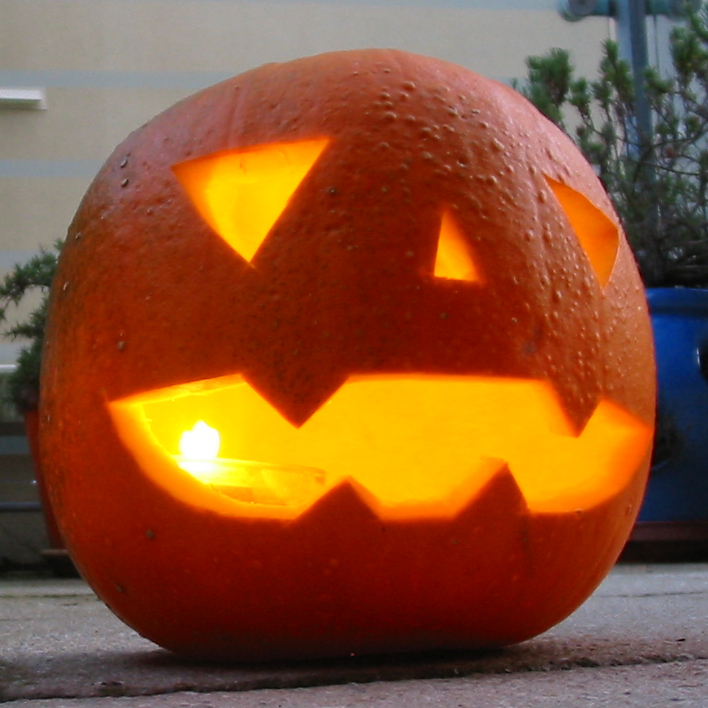
A traditional American jack-o'-lantern, made from a pumpkin, lit from within by a candle

A jack-o'-lantern (or jack o'lantern) is a carved lantern, most commonly made from a pumpkin, or formerly a root vegetable such as a mangelwurzel, rutabaga or turnip. Jack-o'-lanterns are associated with the Halloween holiday. Its name comes from the phenomenon of strange lights flickering over peat bogs, called jack-o'-lanterns (also known as will-o'-the-wisps). It is suggested that the name also has ties to the Irish legend of Stingy Jack, a drunkard who, after deceiving people throughout his life and even Satan, is doomed to roam the Earth with only a hollowed turnip to light his way.

Jack-o'-lanterns carved from pumpkins are a yearly Halloween tradition that developed in the United States when Celtic influenced immigrants brought their root vegetable carving traditions with them. It is common to see jack-o'-lanterns used as external and interior decorations prior to and on Halloween.

To make a jack-o'-lantern, the top of a pumpkin is cut off to form a lid, the inside flesh is scooped out, and an image—usually a "scary" or "funny" face—is carved out of the rind exposing the hollow interior. A light source, traditionally a candle flame or tealight, is placed within before the lid is closed. Artificial jack-o'-lanterns with electric lights are also marketed.

== Etymology ==
The term jack-o'-lantern was originally used to describe the visual phenomenon ignis fatuus (lit., "foolish fire") known as a will-o'-the-wisp in English folklore. Used especially in East England, its earliest known use dates to the 1660s. The Oxford English Dictionary (OED) records use of the term in Britain from 1658 in reference to ignis fatuus, and from 1663 to 1704 in reference to a man with a lantern or to a night watchman. The OED gives 1837 as the earliest date for when the term was used to refer to a lantern carved from a turnip or pumpkin.

== History ==
=== Origin ===
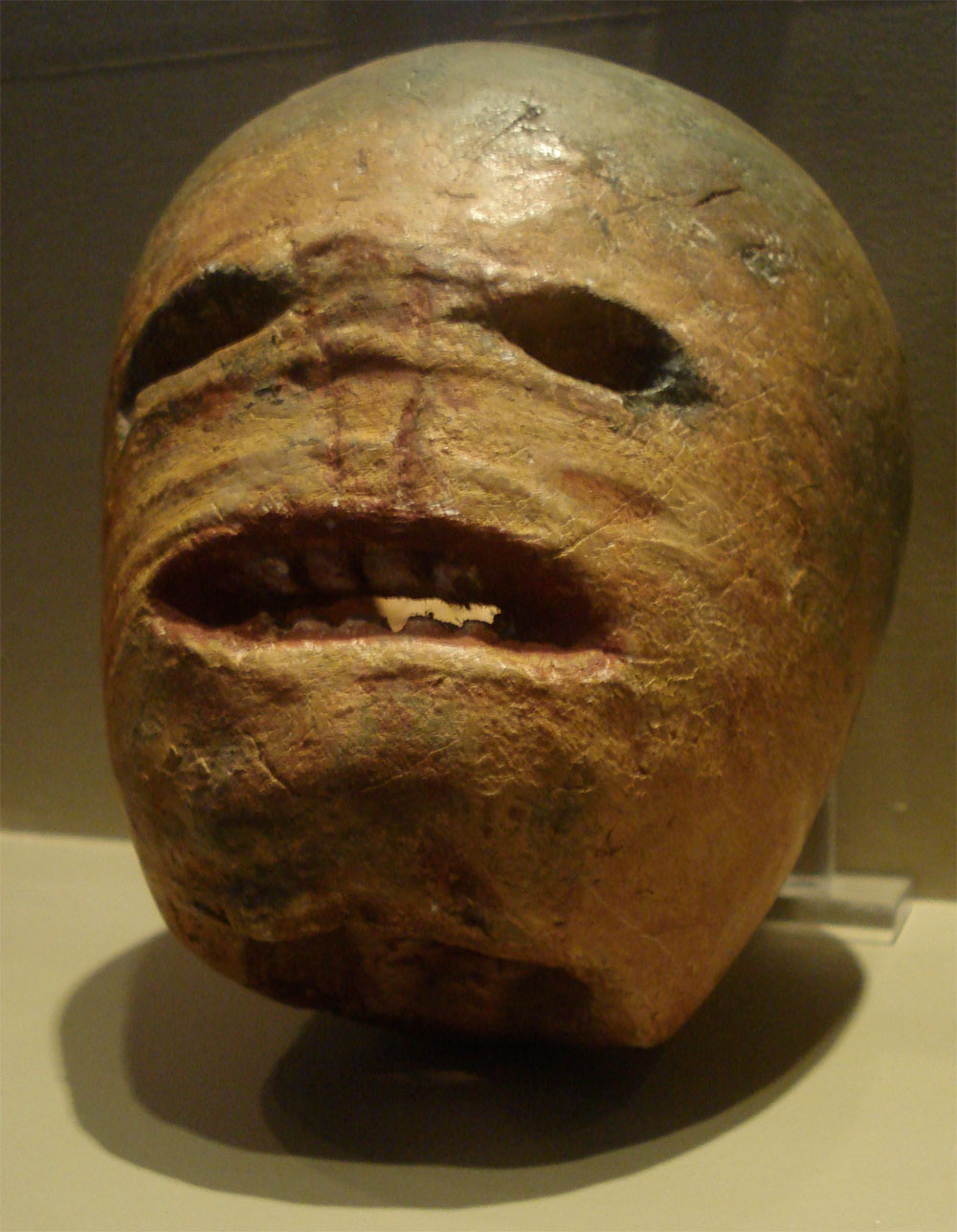
A plaster cast of a traditional Irish jack-o'-lantern in the Museum of Country Life, Ireland. Rutabaga or turnip were often used.

The carving of vegetables has been a common practice in many parts of the world. It is believed that the custom of making jack-o'-lanterns at Halloween time began in Ireland and Britain. The tradition may have originated with ancient Celtic head veneration practices, where warriors would take the heads of defeated foes. These heads could be displayed for spiritual protection and were said to speak warnings. In the Táin Bó Cúailnge, a story from the Ulster Cycle, the severed head of Súaltam warns Cú Chulainn of the approaching Connacht army at the story's climax.

In the 19th century, "turnips or mangel wurzels, hollowed out to act as lanterns and often carved with grotesque faces," were used on Halloween in parts of England, Ireland, Wales and Scotland. In Gaelic-speaking regions, Halloween was also the festival of Samhain and was seen as a time when supernatural beings (the Aos Sí) walked the earth. In Wales such nights were known as Ysbrydnosau (spirit nights), with Calan Gaeaf being the one which occurred on the night of 31 October. Jack-o'-lanterns were also made at Halloween time in Somerset, England (see Punkie Night) during the 19th century.

By those who made them, the lanterns were said to represent either spirits or supernatural beings, or were used to ward off evil spirits. For example, sometimes they were used by Halloween participants to frighten people, and sometimes they were set on windowsills to keep harmful spirits out of one's home. It has also been suggested that the jack-o'-lanterns originally represented Christian souls in purgatory, as Halloween is the eve of All Saints' Day (1 November)/All Souls' Day (2 November).

On January 16, 1836, the Dublin Penny Journal published a long story on the legend of "Jack-o'-the-Lantern", although this does not mention the lantern being carved from a vegetable. In 1837, the Limerick Chronicle refers to a local pub holding a carved gourd competition and presenting a prize to "the best crown of Jack McLantern". The term "McLantern" also appears in an 1841 publication of the same paper.

There is also evidence that turnips were used to carve what was called a "Hoberdy's Lantern" in Worcestershire, England, at the end of the 18th century. The folklorist Jabez Allies outlines other derivations of the name, "Hobany's", which is most likely derived from "Hob and his", with other variations including "Hob-o'-Lantern", "Hobbedy's Lantern" and "Hobbady-lantern".

=== In North America ===
The application of the term to carved pumpkins in American English is first seen in 1837.

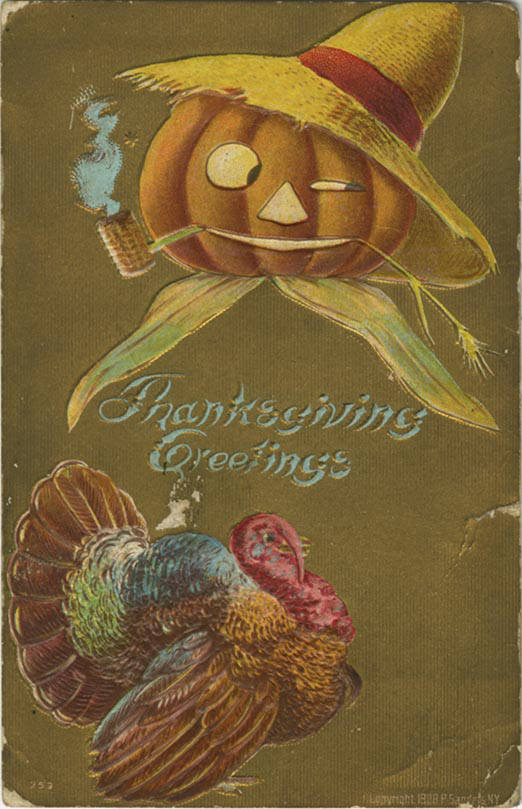
American Thanksgiving Day postcard sent in 1909 with images of a jack-o'-lantern and a turkey

In the United States and Canada, the carved pumpkin was first associated with the harvest season in general before it became a symbol of Halloween. In 1895, an article on Thanksgiving entertaining recommended giving a lit jack-o'-lantern as a child's prize in Thanksgiving games. The poet John Greenleaf Whittier, who was born in Massachusetts in 1807, wrote the poem "The Pumpkin" (1850), which mentions Thanksgiving but not Halloween:

Oh!—fruit loved of boyhood!—the old days recalling,

When wood-grapes were purpling and brown nuts were falling! When wild, ugly faces we carved in its skin,

Glaring out through the dark with a candle within!

The carved pumpkin lantern's association with Halloween is recorded in the 1 November 1866 edition of the Daily News (Kingston, Ontario):

The old time custom of keeping up Hallowe'en was not forgotten last night by the youngsters of the city. They had their maskings and their merry-makings, and perambulated the streets after dark in a way which was no doubt amusing to themselves. There was a great sacrifice of pumpkins from which to make transparent heads and face, lighted up by the unfailing two inches of tallow candle.

In 1879's Funny Nursery Rhymes, a poem admonishes children to avoid being similar to untrustworthy "Master Jack o' Lantern," described as a "wicked, deceiving boy" similar to a will-o'-the-wisp who "dances, and jumps, and gambols." He is humorously illustrated as a personification of a lantern.

An 1885 article "Halloween Sports and Customs" contrasts the American jack-o'-lantern custom with the British bonfire custom:

It is an ancient British custom to light great bonfires (Bone-fire to clear before Winter froze the ground) on Hallowe'en, and carry blazing fagots about on long poles; but in place of this, American boys delight in the funny grinning jack-o'-lanterns made of huge yellow pumpkins with a candle inside.

Adaptations of Washington Irving's short story "The Legend of Sleepy Hollow" (1820) often show the Headless Horseman with a jack-o'-lantern in place of his severed head. In the original story, a shattered pumpkin is discovered next to the missing Ichabod Crane's abandoned hat on the morning after Crane's supposed encounter with the Horseman. The Horseman chased Crane and possibly threw his severed head at him, but the story does not reference jack-o'-lanterns or Halloween.

=== Folklore ===
The story of the jack-o'-lantern comes in many forms and is similar to the story of Will-o'-the-wisp retold in different forms across Western Europe, including, Italy, Norway, Spain and Sweden. In Switzerland, children will leave bowls of milk or cream out for mythical house spirits called Jack o' the bowl. An old Irish folk tale from the mid-18th century tells of Stingy Jack, a lazy yet shrewd blacksmith who uses a cross to trap Satan. One story says that Jack tricked Satan into climbing an apple tree, and once he was up there, Jack quickly placed crosses around the trunk or carved a cross into the bark, so that Satan could not get down.

Another version of the story says that Jack was getting chased by some villagers from whom he had stolen. He then met Satan, who claimed it was time for him to die. However, the thief stalled his death by tempting Satan with a chance to bedevil the church-going villagers chasing him. Jack told Satan to turn into a coin with which he would pay for the stolen goods (Satan could take on any shape he wanted); later, when the coin (Satan) disappeared, the Christian villagers would fight over who had stolen it. The Devil agreed to this plan. He turned himself into a silver coin and jumped into Jack's wallet, only to find himself next to a cross Jack had also picked up in the village. Jack closed the wallet tight, and the cross stripped the Devil of his powers; and so he was trapped.

In both folktales, Jack lets Satan go only after he agrees to never take his soul. Many years later, the thief died, as all living things do. Of course, Jack's life had been too sinful for him to go to Heaven; however, Satan had promised not to take his soul, and so he was barred from Hell as well. Jack now had nowhere to go. He asked how he would see where to go, as he had no light, and Satan mockingly tossed him a burning coal, to light his way. Jack carved out one of his turnips (which were his favorite food), put the coal inside it, and began endlessly wandering the Earth for a resting place. He became known as "Jack of the Lantern", or jack o'lantern.

Cornish folklorist Dr. Thomas Quiller Couch (d. 1884) recorded the use of the term in a rhyme used in Polperro, Cornwall, in conjunction with Joan the Wad, the Cornish version of Will-o'-the-wisp. The people of Polperro regarded them both as pixies. The rhyme goes:

Jack o' the lantern! Joan the wad,
Who tickled the maid and made her mad
Light me home, the weather's bad.

Jack-o-lanterns were also a way of protecting one's home against the undead. Superstitious people used them specifically to ward off vampires. They thought this because it was said that the jack-o-lantern's light was a way of identifying vampires who, once their identity was known, would give up their hunt for you.

== Pumpkin craft ==
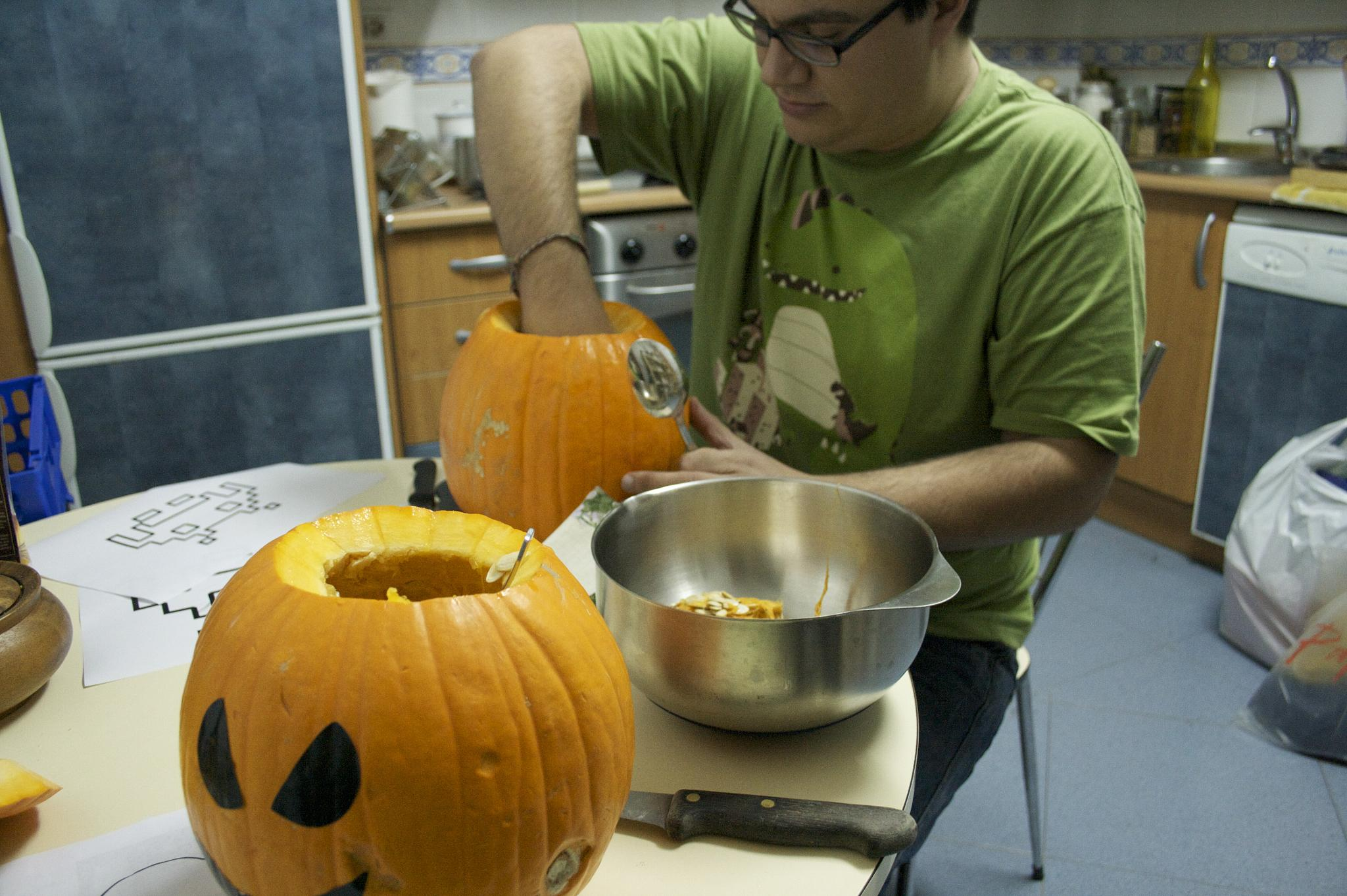
Jack-o'-lanterns in the process of creation

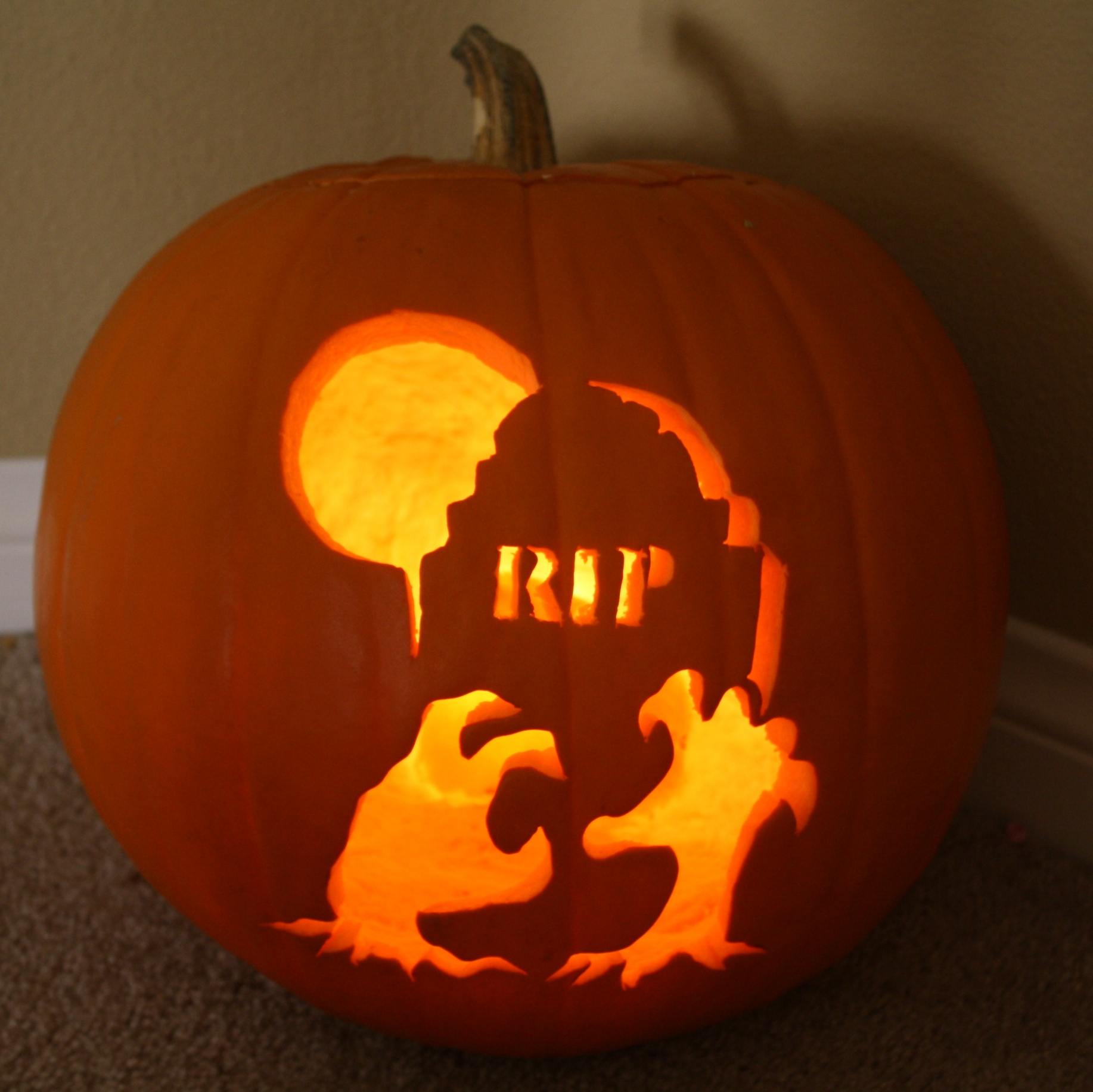
A picture carved onto a jack-o'-lantern for Halloween

Sections of the pumpkin or turnip are cut out to make holes, often depicting a face, which may be either cheerful, scary, or comical. Jack-o'-lanterns are typically made from Connecticut field pumpkins, which are described as "the original commercial jack-o'-lantern pumpkin".

== World records ==
For a long time, Keene, New Hampshire, held the world record for most jack-o'-lanterns carved and lit in one place. The Life is Good Company teamed up with Camp Sunshine, a camp for children with life-threatening illnesses and their families, to break the record. A record was set on October 21, 2006, when 30,128 jack-o'-lanterns were simultaneously lit on Boston Common in downtown Boston, Massachusetts. Highwood, Illinois, tried to set the record on October 31, 2011, with an unofficial count of 30,919 but did not follow the Guinness regulations, so the achievement did not count.

On October 19, 2013, Keene broke the Boston record and reclaimed the world record for most lit jack-o'-lanterns on display (30,581). The town has broken the record eight times since the original attempt.

Raising Cane's founder Todd Graves set the world record for the heaviest jack-o'-lantern in October 2026, weighing in at 3,156 pounds. This broke the previous record of 2,749 pounds set in 2023 by Travis Gienger.

== See also ==
- Apotropaic magic
- Apple doll
- Cuco
- Pumpkin Weeks
- The Great Pumpkin
