= Lochleven Castle =

Castle in Perth and Kinross, Scotland

- Castle Island, Loch Leven, near Kinross, Scotland; UK grid reference NO137017
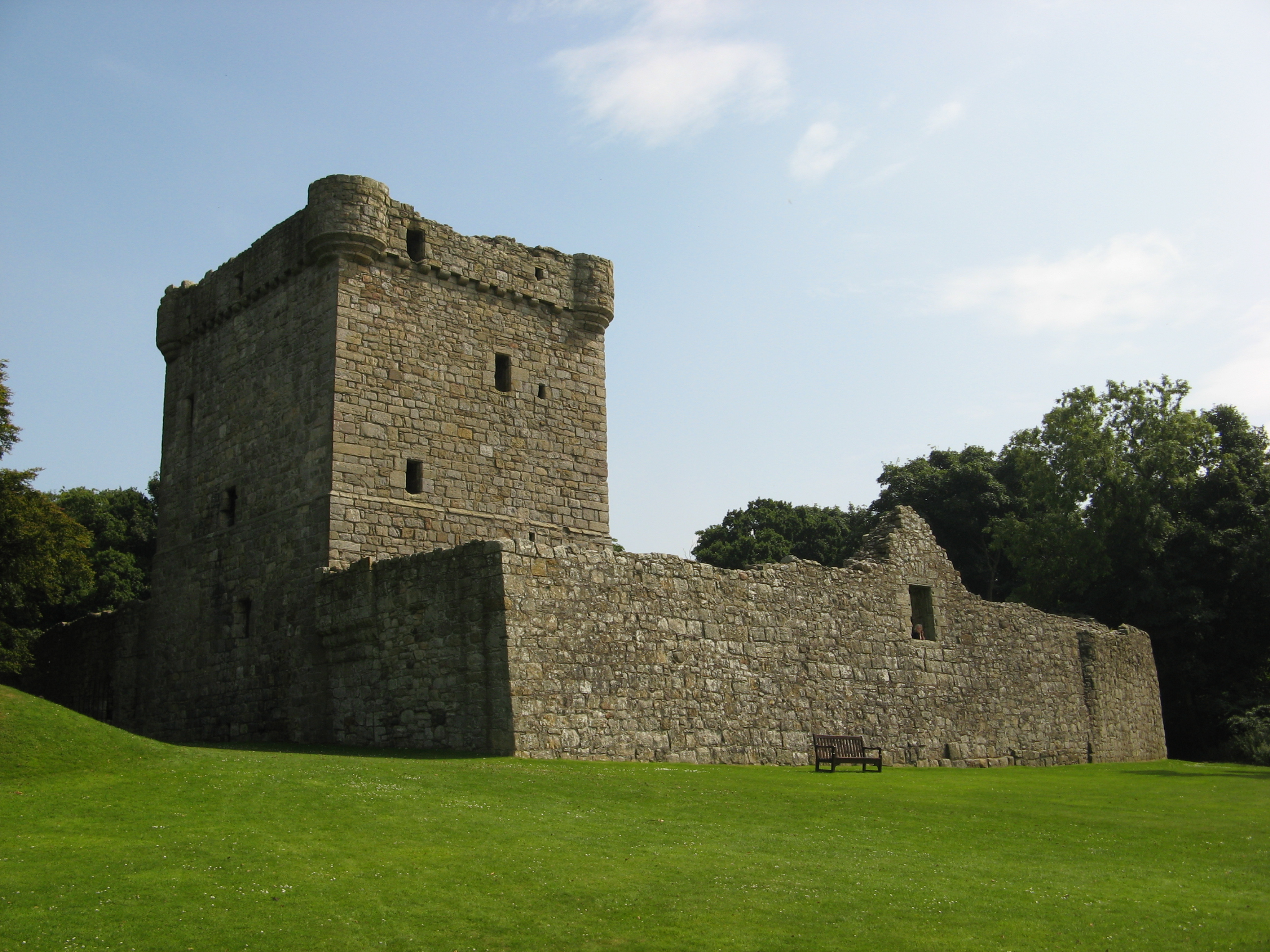
- Keep and west wall of the castle

Site information
- Type: Tower house and courtyard
- Owner: Historic Scotland
- Controlled by: Douglas of Lochleven
- Open to the public: Yes
- Condition: Ruined

Location
- Coordinates: 56.20083°N 3.39200°W

Site history
- Built: 1300 AD
- In use: Until 17th century
- Materials: Stone

Designations

Scheduled monument
- Official name: Lochleven Castle
- Designated: 30 April 1920
- Reference no.: SM90204

Lochleven Castle is a ruined castle on an island in Loch Leven, in the Perth and Kinross local authority area of Scotland. Possibly built around 1300, the castle was the site of military action during the Wars of Scottish Independence (1296–1357). In the latter part of the 14th century, the castle was granted to William Douglas, 1st Earl of Douglas, by his uncle. It remained in the Douglases' hands for the next 300 years. Mary, Queen of Scots, was imprisoned there in 1567–68, and forced to abdicate as queen, before escaping with the help of her gaoler's family. In 1588, the queen's gaoler inherited the title of Earl of Morton, and moved away from the castle. In 1675, Sir William Bruce, an architect, bought the castle and used it as a focal point for his garden; it was never again used as a residence.

The remains of the castle are protected as a scheduled monument in the care of Historic Environment Scotland. Lochleven Castle is open to the public in summer, and access is available by ferry.

== History ==
=== Early history ===
A castle may have been built on Castle Island as early as 1257, when King Alexander III of Scotland, then 16 years old, was forcibly brought there by his regents. During the First War of Scottish Independence (1296–1328), the invading English army held the castle, then named Lochleven Castle; it lies at a strategically important position between the towns of Edinburgh, Stirling and Perth. Part of the present fortification, the curtain wall, may date from this time period and may have been built by the occupying English. The castle was captured by the Scots before the end of the 13th century, possibly by the forces of William Wallace.

English forces laid siege to Lochleven in 1301, but the garrison was relieved in the same year when the siege was broken by Sir John Comyn. King Robert the Bruce (reigned 1306–1329) is known to have visited the castle in 1313 and again in 1323. Following Bruce's death, the English invaded again, and in 1335 laid siege to Lochleven Castle in support of the pretender Edward Balliol (d. 1364). According to the 14th-century chronicle of John of Fordun, the English attempted to flood the castle by building a dam across the outflow of the loch; the water level rose, but after a month the captain of the English force, Sir John de Stirling, left the area to attend the festival of Saint Margaret of Scotland, and the defenders, under Alan de Vipont, took advantage of his absence to come out of the castle under cover of night, and damage the dam, causing it to collapse and flood the English camp. However, this account has been doubted by later historians.

Loch Leven Castle was fortified in the 14th or early-15th century by the addition of a five-storey tower house or keep. According to Historic Scotland, it was built in the 14th century, making it one of the oldest tower houses in Scotland that still substantially survives. In 1390, King Robert II (reigned 1371–1390) granted the castle to Sir Henry Douglas, the husband of his niece Marjory. Beginning in the 14th century, the castle served as a state prison. Several notable men were imprisoned there, including Robert II in 1369 (before he became king), Archibald Douglas, 5th Earl of Douglas (d. 1439), early in the 15th century, and Patrick Graham, the Archbishop of St Andrews, in 1478 (who died in captivity there).

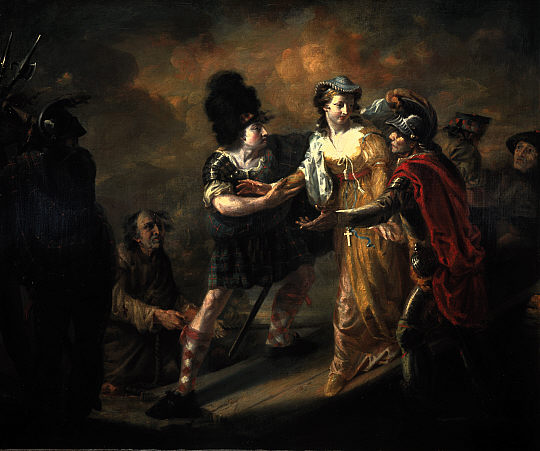
Mary, Queen of Scots, Escaping from Lochleven Castle (1805) by William Craig Shirreff.

=== 16th century ===
Mary, Queen of Scots (reigned 1542–1567), stayed at Lochleven for a week in May 1562 to recover after she fell from her horse while riding out from Falkland Palace, In April 1563, she had an interview there with the Calvinist preacher John Knox.

In June 1565, Mary stayed at Perth, at Ruthven Castle, and Innerpeffray Castle. It was said the Earl of Moray and the Earl of Argyll plotted to capture her and Lord Darnley as they returned to Edinburgh riding by Loch Leven. Mary would have been imprisoned in Lochleven Castle and Darnley taken to Castle Campbell to prevent their marriage. The alleged attempt to kidnap the couple and imprison them was known the "Raid of Beath".

In September 1565, Mary visited Loch Leven again as the guest of William Douglas of Lochleven (d. 1606). Two years later, Mary returned to Lochleven as a prisoner. She was held there from 17 June 1567 until her escape on 2 May 1568. She had been imprisoned there after the Battle of Carberry Hill on 15 June, when she surrendered to her noblemen, who opposed her marriage to the Earl of Bothwell. She was taken to Lochleven and given into the custody of William Douglas of Lochleven. For most of her captivity she lived in Glassin Tower (built in the early 16th century), at the south-east corner of the castle. Some of William Douglas's daughters slept in her bedchamber for extra security.

Mary fell ill on her arrival, which was suspected to be the result of a deliberate poisoning, and sometime before 24 July she miscarried twins that she had conceived with Bothwell; they were hastily buried in the grounds. She was probably nursed back to health by Agnes Leslie. Only a few days later she was forced to abdicate as Queen of Scots in favour of her infant son James.

The household included Sir William Douglas's mother Lady Margaret Douglas (mother of Mary's half-brother the Earl of Moray), his brother George Douglas, and Willie Douglas (a young orphaned relative). There were five or six ladies, four or five gentlewomen, and two chamberers, one Scottish and one French. Mary asked for an apothecary, a valet for her chamber, and an embroiderer who could draw patterns for her needlework. Mary wrote that her household at Lochleven was reduced to just two serving women, a cook, and a surgeon or doctor, when her keepers were persuading her to resign the throne. She signed the demission on 24 July 1567.

William Maitland of Lethington and Mary Fleming sent her a gold jewel depicting the lion and mouse of Aesop's fable. This was a token alluding to the possibility of escape, and his continuing support for her, the mouse could free the lion by nibbling away the knots of the net. Mary wore the jewel at the castle and Marie Courcelles, one of her women and sometimes described as her French chamberer, provided a description. For a time, Mary was moved into the main tower, considered easier to guard at night than her first lodging.

Mary recovered during the autumn and winter of 1567, and gradually won George Douglas over to her own cause. A contemporary wrote that George was "in fantasy of love wythe hir." Mary asked her servant Servais de Condé to send her materials for textile projects and embroidery. She also made multiple attempts to escape. Once, she pretended to be the laundress, Margaret Aitkin, while one of her ladies took her place inside the castle. However, as she was leaving, the boatman who was taking her across the loch recognized her, and took her back to the castle. Another time, she planned to escape by scaling the 7-foot (2.1 m) wall outside the castle, but one of her ladies-in-waiting, Jane Kennedy, injured herself while they were practising the escape. On the night she finally successfully escaped, she dressed as a servant, Willie Douglas stole the keys, and Marie Courcelles let her walk out of the castle. She was then rowed across the loch to where George Douglas was waiting for her, along with 200 horsemen, and they fled to Niddry Castle in Lothian. Three days after, her French cook Estienne Hauet and his wife Elles Boug packed her silk and velvet gowns and other items in a chest to send to Mary wherever she might be.

Old keys found when the level of the loch was lowered in the 19th-century are said to be those taken by Willie Douglas. The castle is one of many in Scotland said to be haunted by Mary's spirit because she is waiting for her twins to return to her so they would know their loss of life was not her fault; the sadness she felt about their loss kept her trapped within the castle walls after her death. Janet Boyman, Marion Nicnevin, and William Stewart of Luthrie were subsequently accused of witchcraft and charged with making predictions about Mary's escape.

The English Earl of Northumberland was also held here, after offending Elizabeth I of England. He was confined at Loch Leven for two years before being sent back to England to be executed. Regent Morton retired to the castle in 1578 and spent his time "making the alleys of the garden even". James VI made plans to visit Lochleven on 7 July 1580 as part of his first progress in Scotland. In 1588, when Sir William Douglas of Lochleven succeeded to the earldom of Morton as the 6th earl, he inherited other properties along with the title, including Aberdour Castle in Fife, and as a result Loch Leven Castle became less frequently used.

=== Sir William Bruce ===
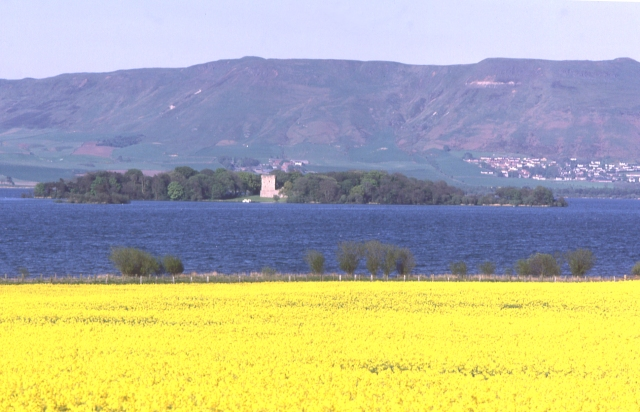
Looking across fields of oilseed rape to Loch Leven Castle

From around 1546, Margaret Erskine and her son William Douglas built a house on the shore of the Loch which was known as "Newhouse" The "Newhouse" replaced the island castle as the legal centre of the estate in 1619. On 12 May 1589, William Douglas, now 6th Earl of Morton, entertained the Danish Admiral Peder Munk at the Newhouse. He had been to Falkland Palace taking possession of the property as part of the king's "morning gift" to his bride Anne of Denmark.

In 1675, the Loch Leven estate was bought from the Douglases by Sir William Bruce (c.1630–1710), royal architect in Scotland. Bruce built nearby Kinross House on the loch shore from 1686, aligning the principal axis of house and garden on the distant castle. The "Newhouse", which was finally demolished in 1723, was just to the north of Bruce's site. Kinross was one of the first buildings in the classical style erected in Scotland. Thereafter Lochleven Castle was no longer used as a dwelling, but it was preserved by Bruce as a picturesque focus for his gardens.

=== Recent years ===
Lochleven Castle had fallen into ruin by the 18th century, but the ruins were conserved and rubbish removed in 1840. The estate passed from the Bruces to the Graham family in the 18th century and then, in the 19th century, to the Montgomerys, who no longer occupy Kinross House.

Lochleven Castle was given in to state care in 1939, and is now managed by Historic Environment Scotland. Today, the castle can be reached by a 12-person ferry operated from Kinross during the summer months. The remains of the castle are protected as a Scheduled Ancient Monument.

== Description ==
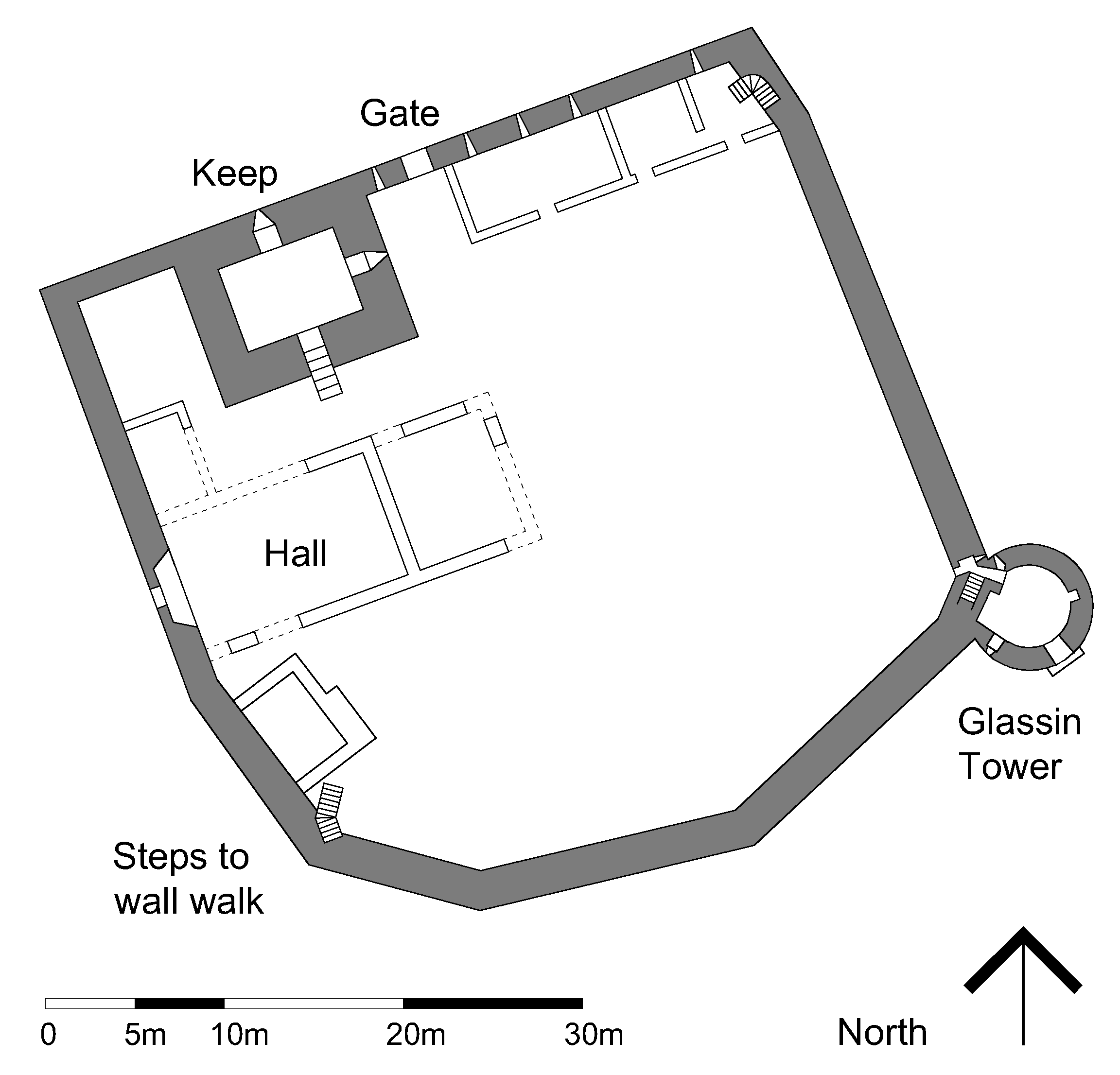
Ground floor plan of Loch Leven Castle

The castle, and an outer enclosure of which little trace remains, originally took up almost the entire area of Castle Island. The present wooded, and considerably larger, island was formed in the early 19th century when the canalising of the outflow of the River Leven, which enters the Firth of Forth at the town of Leven, led to a substantial lowering of the water level.

The castle comprises a rectangular courtyard surrounded by a curtain wall, with a tower house, or keep, at one corner, and the round Glassin Tower projecting from the opposite corner. The foundations of demolished ranges of buildings remain around two sides of the courtyard. Of the outer court, only an earth bank shows the position of the walls, with fragmentary remains of a bakehouse the only visible structures.

=== Tower house ===
The tower house, or keep, at the west corner of the enclosure, measures 36.5 feet (11.1 m) by 31.5 feet (9.6 m) and originally had five storeys, although the roof and timber floors are now gone. The lowest level is a vaulted basement, with a vaulted kitchen above. The hall was on the next floor, with chambers above, all linked by a spiral stair.

=== Glassin Tower ===
The Glassin Tower is a round tower that was built into the south-east corner of the ancient curtain wall, probably around 1550. The derivation of 'Glassin' is unknown. The purpose of the tower was to provide additional accommodation and to give the castle a more imposing appearance. Gunholes that allowed fire to be directed along the external face of the curtain wall improved defence. The tower has a vaulted basement for storing water, accessed separately from the courtyard. The basement has separate channels to allow water to be collected from the loch and waste water to be drained through a slop-drain. The lower chamber has an oriel window which would have given views over the loch. The upper chamber served as a bedchamber. At the very top a small room, accessible only from the wall walk, was possibly a study or library.

=== Archaeological findings ===
A minor excavation in 1995 found the footings and two steps of a stone stairway that provided access to the Great Hall of the tower. 16th-century pottery and animal bones were found in 0.75 metres (2.5 ft) of debris near the forestair.
