= Kate McNiven =

Scottish nurse, executed as a witch

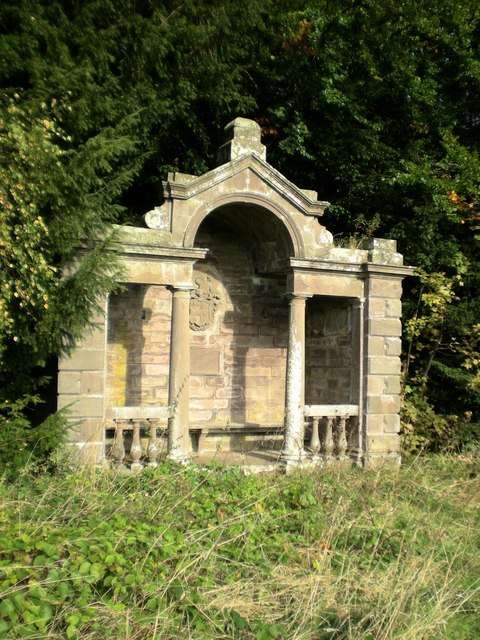
The Inchbrakie House Monument. The Graeme of Inchbrakie Coat of Arms is embedded on the main wall

Kate McNiven, also called Kate Nike Neiving or Catharine Niven, was a nurse and accused witch who served the House of Inchbrakie in the Parish of Monzie, near Crieff in Scotland. The date of her death is disputed, ranging from the 16th to 18th century. Louisa G. Graeme, a descendant of the Inchbrakie family, noted in 1903 that no authentic record of McNiven's death existed, and the story has "caused endless discussion and argument".

== Legend ==
According to local legend, Kate McNiven was a reputed witch who lived in a cave and had served as nursemaid to the Laird of Inchbrakie when he was young. She was a healer and, in one version, was rumored to sometimes take the form of a bee. Found guilty of witchcraft, she was sentenced to die by strangling and burning on the Knock of Crieff, near her cave. The Laird attempted to stop the execution but failed. As she died, Kate cursed the local town of Monzie and its officials, who were involved in her murder, so that they would never grow or prosper. However, she spat out a small blue stone – in some versions, this was pulled from a necklace she was wearing – and gave it to the Laird of Inchbrakie. She promised him that as long as he and his descendants kept it on their land, they would always have heirs to hold the property. Graeme describes the stone as a "moonstone sapphire" and claims that generations later it was removed from the house by mistake, and as a result the property was gradually sold away. Graeme mentions multiple locations around Monzie named for McNiven, such as "Kate McNiven's Yett," "Kate McNiven's Craig," and "Kate McNiven's Well."

== History ==
The first known mention in print is from 1818. This uses the name "Catharine Niven," gives no date, and does not include the curse on Monzie.

McNiven's date of death is often set in 1715 during the Witch Hunts, twenty years before the Witchcraft Act 1735 (9 Geo. 2. c. 5) abolished these executions. This would make her the last witch burnt in Perthshire. However, this date was probably an invention by the Rev. George Blair for The Holocaust, his 1845 poetic adaptation of McNiven's story. Blair gathered as much information as possible, but fictionalized the details due to the lack of sources.

A Calendar of Cases of Witchcraft in Scotland 1510–1727 dates McNiven's death around 1615, stating that "Her date is uncertain." John L. Wilson also dated the execution to 1615 and noted its similarities to the case of John Brughe.

Alexander Porteous rendered her name as Kate Nike Neiving and placed her death in 1563. He may have been influenced by reading about Brughe's case.

John Brughe of Fossoway, on trial in November 1643, was said to have learned witchcraft from a widow, Neane VcClerith or Nikclerica. She was the niece of "Nikneveing that notorious and infamous witche in Monzie.” At this time, it was said "Nikneveing" or "Nik Neiving" had been burnt at the stake eighty years before, placing her death in the 1560s.

This has also been compared to a case from May 1569, in St. Andrews, where "a notabill sorceres" named Nic Neville or Nicniven was burnt to death. This case was referenced in the letters of Sir John Mure, who mentioned the trial of "Niknevin" (ongoing at the time) and said that some thought she would be executed while others did not, and she was considered dangerous. She refused to admit any kind of guilt, stating that she had been accused by apothecaries who were jealous of her skill in healing. Mure added that she was a hundred years old and defended herself cleverly.

Alexander Montgomerie's satirical Flyting (c. 1585) describes a witch named Nicneven who rides at the head of a wild procession of witches. Oddly, in some copies of the manuscript she sends an infant foundling to "Kait of Creif," which some readers have connected to Kate and the location of Crieff. Scholars such as Alison Hanham and Jennifer Simpson have debated whether Montgomerie's Nicneven was inspired by a real woman burnt for witchcraft around the 1560s. Alternately, C. K. Sharpe proposes that Catharine Niven, due to her reputation as a witch, was given the name Niven after "the Fairy Queen".

== Bibliography ==
- Blair, Revd. George. The Holocaust, or The Witch of Monzie. London, 1835.
- Hunter, Revd. John. Chronicles of Strathearn. David Philips, Crieff, 1896. Illustrated by W.B. MacDougall.
- Sharpe, Charles Kirkpatrick. Historical Account of the Belief in Witchcraft in Scotland. Hamilton, Adams & Co, 1884. Reprinted Kessinger Publishing Co, 2003.
