= Jack O'The Lantern =

Mythical character often associated with Halloween

The legend of Jack O'The Lantern
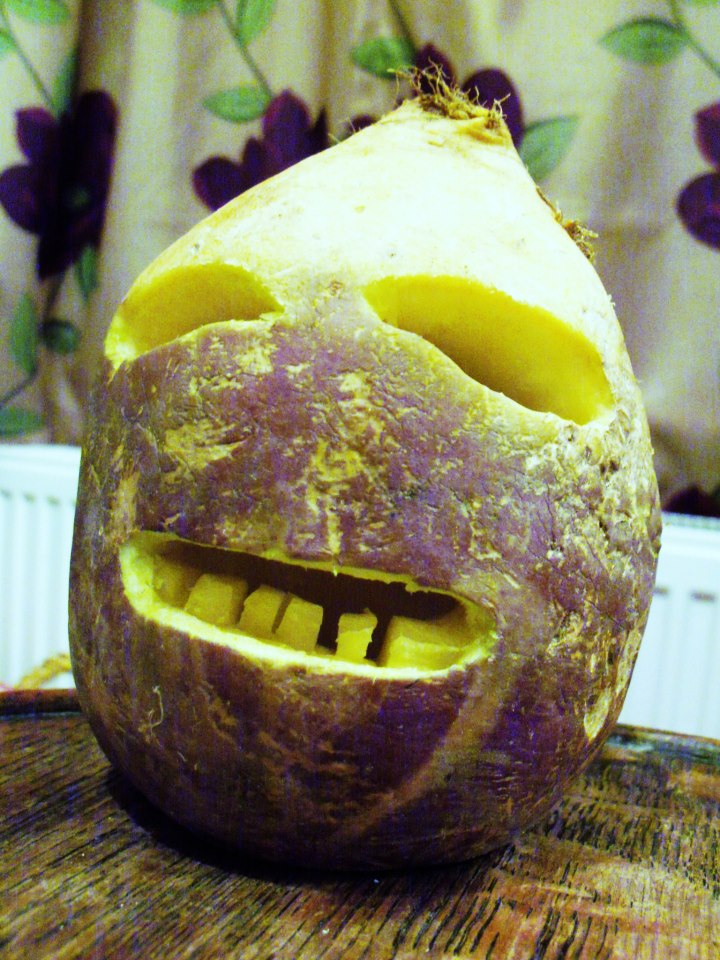
- Old "turnip lantern", the original Jack-o'-lantern, derived from the tale

Folk tale
- Name: The legend of Jack O'The Lantern
- Also known as: Jack-o'-Lantern; Jack the Smith; Drunk Jack; Flaky Jack; Jack of the Lantern
- Country: Ireland

The legend of Jack O'The Lantern (Jack O'Lantern), also variously known as Stingy Jack, Jack the Smith, Drunk Jack, Flaky Jack, Pumpkin Jack, etc, is a folktale and legend from Ireland, which is told around All Hallows' Eve to explain the origin of Jack-o'-lanterns. The symbolic magnitude of the story and the lanterns has made the titular character into a form of mascot for the holiday in the areas where tradition is the strongest.

== Story ==
This 1851 poem by Hercules Ellis dramatizes the story of Stingy Jack.

Being a folktale, the story below is told through immersion to reflect use in practice. Also note, that many versions exist, of which none is canonized. It is still very much a wandering folktale, and will differ between retellings.

Several centuries ago in Ireland, there lived a drunkard known as Stingy Jack. He was known throughout the land as a deceiver or manipulator, frequently tricking and cheating people to get his way his entire life. On a fateful night, Satan overheard the tale of Jack's evil deeds and silver tongue. Unconvinced and envious of the rumours, the devil went to find out for himself whether or not Jack lived up to his vile reputation.

Typical of Jack, he was drunk and wandering through the countryside at night when he came upon a body on his cobblestone path. The body, with an eerie grimace on its face, turned out to be the devil himself. Jack realized that this was his end; Satan had finally come to collect his malevolent soul. So Jack made a last request: he asked the devil to let him drink ale before he departed to Hell. Finding no reason not to acquiesce the request, Satan took Jack to the local pub and supplied him with many alcoholic beverages. Upon quenching his thirst, Jack asked Satan to pay the tab for the ale, much to his surprise because he didn't carry any money. Jack convinced him to turn himself into a silver coin with which to pay the bartender and change back when he's not looking. Satan did so, impressed upon by Jack's unyielding nefarious tactics. Shrewdly, Jack stuck the now transmogrified Satan (coin) into his pocket, which also contained a crucifix. The crucifix's presence kept the devil from escaping his form. This coerced Satan to agree to Jack's demand: in exchange for his freedom, he had to spare Jack's soul for ten years.

Ten years after the date Jack originally struck his deal, he naturally found himself once again in the devil's presence. Jack happened upon Satan in the same setting as before and he seemingly accepted it was his time to go to Hell for good. As Satan prepared to take him to Hell, Jack asked if he could have one apple to feed his starving belly. Foolishly, Satan once again agreed to this request. As he climbed up the branches of a nearby apple tree, Jack surrounded its base with crucifixes. Satan, frustrated at the fact that he had been entrapped again, demanded his release. As Jack did before, he made a second demand: that he will never take his soul to Hell. Having no choice, the devil agreed and was set free.

Eventually the drinking took its toll on Jack, and he died. Jack's soul prepared to enter heaven through the gates of St. Peter, but he was stopped. Jack was told by God that because of his sinful lifestyle of deceitfulness and drinking, he was not allowed into Heaven. Jack then went down to the Gates of Hell and begged for admission into the underworld. Satan, fulfilling his obligation to Jack, could not take his soul. He gave Jack an ember to light his way. Jack is doomed to roam the world between the planes of good and evil, with only an ember inside a hollowed turnip ("turnip" in this context referring to a large rutabaga) to light his way.

== See also ==
- Faust
- Great Pumpkin
- Pan Twardowski
