= Nicnevin =

Figure in Scottish folklore

Nicneven, Nicnevin or Nicnevan is a witch or fairy queen from Scottish folklore. She is often said to be the same figure as the Gyre-Carling or Hecate, but some scholars disagree with this. It is debated whether the name originally referred to a real woman or a mythical goddess.

== Etymology ==
The name may derive from a Scottish Gaelic surname Neachneohain, meaning "daughter(s) of the divine", and/or "daughter(s) of Scathach", or NicNaoimhein, meaning "daughter of the little saint". Other theories propose that the name derives from the Irish war goddess Neamhain, or is connected to water-spirits such as the Nixie, Nokke or even Neptune.

== Legend ==
The first known mention of Nicneven was by Alexander Montgomerie around 1580. Montgomerie and Patrick Hume of Polwarth were two court poets under King James VI of Scotland. In a "flyting" or exchange of comical insults in verse, Montgomerie described the birth of Patrick Hume (referred to as Polwart throughout the poem). In his story, Polwart is the hideous offspring of an elf and an ape, conceived during the Halloween procession of the King and Queen of the Fairies. The infant Polwart is found by the Weird Sisters and then passed on to Nicneven and her group of nymphs or witches, who dedicate him to Hecatus (Hecate) and Pluto in an unholy ritual.

Nicnevin with her nymphes, in number anew
With charms from Caitness and Chanrie of Ross
Whose cunning consists in casting a clew.

After Montgomerie's poem, the next known mentions of Nicneven date from the early 1800s. In 1801, John Leyden wrote that Nicneven was one of the "popular appellations" of "the gyre-carlin, the Queen of Fairies, the great hag, Hecate, or mother-witch of the peasants". Robert Cromek gave a more colorful description:

"We will close our history of witchcraft with the only notice we could collect, of a celebrated personage, called the Gyre Carline; who is reckoned the mother of glamour, and near a-kin to Satan himself. She is believed to preside over the 'Hallowmass Rades' and mothers frequently frighten their children by threatening to give them to McNeven, or the Gyre Carline. She is described as wearing a long gray mantle, and carrying a wand, which, like the miraculous rod of Moses, could convert water into rocks and sea into solid land."

Writers such as Sir Walter Scott conflated Nicneven not only with Hecate but with other queens of fairies and witches like Diana and Herodias.

== Gyre-Carling ==
The Gyre-Carling is a witch- or ogress-like figure, with variants such as Gyre-Carlin, Gy-Carling, and Gay-Carlin. Gyre is possibly a cognate of the Norse word geri and thus has the meaning "greedy", or it may be from the Norse gýgr meaning "ogress"; carling or carline is a Scots and Northern English word meaning "old woman" which is from, or related to, the Norse word kerling (of the same meaning).

One satirical depiction from the 16th-century Bannatyne Manuscript described "an grit Gyre-Carling", who "levit vpoun Christiane menis flesche." After a love-quarrel with her neighbour, she left Scotland to become wife of "Mahomyte" and queen of the "Jowis". In Fife, the Gyre-Carling was associated with spinning and knitting, like Habetrot. There it was believed to be unlucky to leave a piece of knitting unfinished at the New Year, lest the Gyre-Carling steal it.

It was also frequently a generic term for witches. In his response to Montgomerie, Polwart wrote "Leave boggles, brownies, gyr-carlings and gaists." Similarly in 1793, Robert Heron wrote that fairies and "Gyar-Carlins" roamed on Halloween and other nights to stop those they were displeased with, and could be heard curling on the ice on winter nights.

== Nicneven as a historical figure ==
One possibility raised by scholars is that Nicneven was inspired by a real woman condemned to death for witchcraft. Another theory, as seen in Sir Walter Scott and C. K. Sharpe, is that multiple women were nicknamed in honor of the legendary figure.

In May 1569, an accused witch known as Marion Nicneven or Nikniving was condemned to death and burnt at the stake at St. Andrews. She told her interrogators that the apothecaries had caused her arrest because of her superior healing powers. John Mure of Caldwell described the progress of her trial in a letter to the Earl of Eglinton. She was mentioned in the trial of William Stewart of Luthrie, a herald accused of witchcraft and conspiracy against Regent Moray, and was said to have discussed "things to come" including the escape of Mary, Queen of Scots, from Lochleven Castle. This woman may have been the same as Nikneveing of Monzie, mentioned in the 1643 witchcraft trial of John Brughe of Fossoway. Brughe's teacher, Neane NcClerith, was Nikneveing's niece.

Several legends surround a nurse, Catherine Niven or Kate McNiven of Monzie, who was also burned to death for witchcraft. Sources give widely varying dates including 1563, 1615, or 1715.

== Analysis ==
Some scholars such as Alison Hanham have expressed skepticism that Nicneven is the same as the Gyre-Carlin or that she was meant to be understood as a queen of the fairies. Hanham refers to Montgomery's Flyting as "Nicneven's earliest, and indeed only authentic, literary appearance", dismissing the views of Scott, Cromek, and others who call Nicneven "the Scottish Hecate." In the Flyting, Nicneven is a worshipper of Hecate. Jacqueline Simpson pointed out that the term "gyr-carlings" does appear in Polwart's response to Montgomerie and could possibly refer to Nicneven and her witches, but also noted the extreme gap of "over two hundred years" between Montgomerie's poem and the much later sources describing Nicneven as a fairy queen or goddess.

== See also ==
- Elf
- Fairy
- Queen of Elphame
- Wild Hunt
