= Patrick Adamson =

16th-century Scottish archbishop

The Most Reverend Patrick Adamson
- Archbishop of St Andrews
- Church: Church of Scotland
- Archdiocese: St Andrews
- In office: 1575–1592
- Predecessor: John Douglas
- Successor: George Gledstanes
- Other post: Primate of Scotland

Orders
- Consecration: 1576

Personal details
- Born: March 1537 Royal Burgh of Perth, Scotland
- Died: 10 February 1592 (aged 54) St Andrews, Scotland
- Denomination: Presbyterian
- Spouse: Elizabeth Arthur
- Children: 2 sons and 1 daughter
- Education: University of St Andrews (MA)
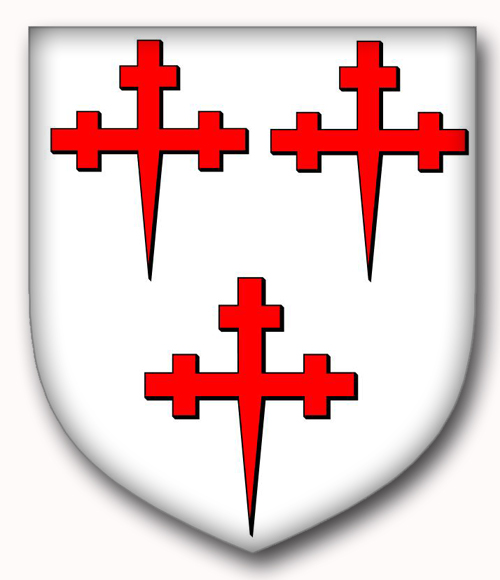
- Coat of arms: Patrick Adamson's coat of arms

Patrick Adamson (March 1537 – 10 February 1592) was a Scottish divine, and Archbishop of St Andrews from 1575.

== Life ==
Adamson was born at Perth where his father, Patrick Adamson, a burgess became Dean of Merchant Guildry.

Adamson studied philosophy at the University of St Andrews where he graduated with a MA, later receiving a doctorate.

== Residence in France ==
After serving as Minister of Ceres, Fife for three years, in 1565, Adamson travelled to Paris as tutor to the eldest son of Sir James MacGill, the Lord Clerk Register (or Clericus Rotulorum of Scotland), serving there initially as a Knights Hospitaller chaplain.

In June 1566, Adamson wrote a Latin poem on the birth of Prince James for Mary, Queen of Scots and her King consort, Lord Darnley. He described the young James as serenissimus princeps "of France and England" which offended Elizabeth I who complained to Queen Mary about his "small trifling book". Adamson was detained for over a year in France. He was released only through the intercession of Queen Mary and other senior Scots nobility, thereafter relocating with his pupil to read law at the University of Bourges.

At the time of the 1572 St. Bartholomew's Day Massacre in Paris, Adamson had been living under cover at a tavern in Bourges for seven months; its aged landlord was later reportedly thrown from the roof for offering charity to such a "heretic". Adamson's time at this "sepulchre" was spent composing a Latin poetical version of the Book of Job and a tragedy of Herod the Great, also written in the Latin language.

== Return to Scotland ==
In 1572, Adamson returned to Scotland becoming Minister of Paisley. In 1575, he was appointed by the General Assembly as one of the commissioners to settle the jurisdiction and policy of the church. As Moderator in the following year, he together with his successor, David Lyndsay, presented the Church Assembly proceedings to Lord Morton, Regent of Scotland.

In 1576, Adamson's consecration as Archbishop of St Andrews gave rise to a protracted conflict among the Presbyterian faction in the Assembly. Adamson had already published a catechism of Latin verse dedicated to James VI, which work was highly acclaimed even by his opponents, as well as a Latin translation of the Scots Confession of Faith.

In 1578, Adamson submitted himself before the General Assembly, procuring a brief respite but the following year fresh accusations were brought against him. During these turbulent political times, he took refuge in St Andrews Castle, where a so-called "wise woman", Alison Pearson, who was later burned for witchcraft, cured his apparent "serious illness".

== Excommunication ==
In 1583, Adamson returned to public service by being posted as Scottish ambassador to the Court of St James's of Elizabeth I of England; whilst in London rumours were spread about his bad behaviour. On his return he implemented strong measures in parliament against Presbyterians, and consequently accusations of heresy followed with excommunication at a provincial synod held at St Andrews in April 1586; however, at the next General Assembly this verdict was rescinded as being ultra vires.

In 1587 and 1588, however, fresh accusations were brought against Adamson, and again he was excommunicated, though afterwards on the inducement of a former adversary, Andrew Melville, his sentence was remitted. Meanwhile, Adamson had produced the Book of Lamentations, and the Book of Revelation in Latin verse which he dedicated to the king but complained of his harsh treatment. King James was unmoved by Adamson's representations and transferred the episcopal revenues to his new favourite, Ludovic, 2nd Duke of Lennox.

After falling from grace, Adamson spent the remaining three years of his life supported by charity.

== Legacy ==
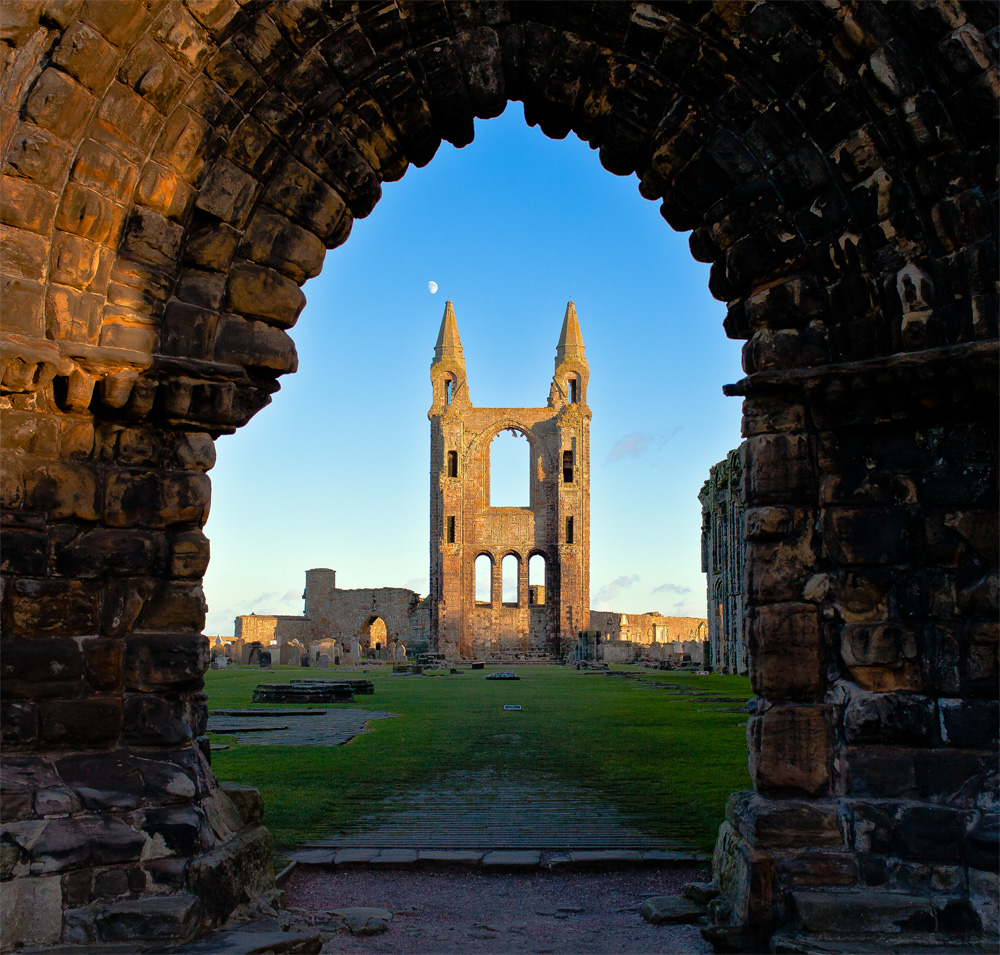
Cathedral of St Andrews, Fife

Adamson possessed many gifts, being learned and eloquent, but also had grave defects of character; however, the "Recantation of Episcopacy (1590)" attributed to him is probably spurious. His collected works, prefaced by a favourable panegyric, in the course of which it is said that "he was a miracle of nature, and rather seemed to be the immediate production of God Almighty than born of a woman", were published by his son-in-law, Thomas Wilson, in 1619.

An heraldic memorial to Adamson survives at the ancient cathedral of St Andrews.

By his wife Elizabeth née Arthur, Adamson had two sons, James and Patrick, and a daughter, Mariota, who married Sir Michael Balfour. His elder brothers, James and Henry, both served as Provost of Perth, and they were fathers of Henry and John Adamson respectively.

Religious titles
Preceded by John Douglas	Archbishop of St Andrews; 1576–1592	Succeeded by George Gledstanes (in 1604)
Academic offices
Preceded by John Douglas; Archbishop of St Andrews	Chancellor of the University of St Andrews; 1576–1592	Succeeded by Lord Maitland of Thirlestane
