= Alison Pearson (accused witch) =

Scottish woman executed for witchcraft (1533–1588)

Alison Pearson (or Pierson) (or Alesoun Pierson) (born c. 1533, died Edinburgh 1588) was executed for witchcraft. On being tried in 1588, she confessed to visions of a fairy court.

== Background ==
Alison Pearson was born c. 1533. She lived in Boarhills (Byrehill), Fife, near St Andrews, Fife. She worked as a healer around the St Andrews area with a ghost of her uncle, William Simpson, as a spirit guide. Simpson's ghost associated with fairies and a vision of him had cured Pearson of illness when she was a child.

== Witchcraft ==
She was investigated for witchcraft in 1583 by Patrick Adamson, Archbishop of St Andrews; however, when he was ill and others could not cure him, treatment by Pearson led to his full recovery. Adamson's enemies claimed this was witchcraft and Pearson was imprisoned in St Andrews Castle, from where Adamson helped her to escape. Scottish Ballad-writer, Robert Sempill, wrote about Pearson and Adamson.

== Investigation, confession and conviction ==
In 1588 she was again investigated and tried for witchcraft, which led to her conviction and execution by burning. One of the charges against her was that "she had concocted for the archbishop a beverage of ewe's milk, claret, herbs, &c., making ‘ane quart att anis, quhilk he drank att twa drachtis, twa sindrie dyetis’ (Pitcairn's Criminal Trials, i. 165)." Her confession included details of being taken by "ane lusty mane, with mony mene and wemen" to the fairy court. She said she had met the Queen of Elves, had been carried by a whirlwind, and might wake up somewhere unexpected. Yeoman notes that Pearson described losing the power in her left side and that such loss of bodily faculties was often described in witch confessions of the period as well as in the religious trance descriptions of late 17th century visionaries like Barbara Peebles.

== Bibliography ==
- Bullen, Arthur Henry. "Adamson, Patrick" . In Stephen, Leslie (ed.). Dictionary of National Biography. Vol. 01. London: Smith, Elder & Co. pp. 111–115.
- Goodare, Julian (2002), The Scottish Witch-Hunt in Context, Manchester University Press, ISBN 9780719060243
- Goodare, Julian (2018), "Pearson, Alison (Pierson)" in Ewan, Elizabeth; Pipes, Rose; Rendall, Jane; Reynolds, Siân (eds), The New Biographical Dictionary of Scottish Women, Edinburgh University Press, ISBN 978-1-4744-3628-1
- Goodare, Julian; Martin, Lauren; Miller, Joyce (eds) (2008), Witchcraft and Belief in Early Modern Scotland, Palgrave Macmillan, ISBN 978-0-230-50788-3
