= Joan the Wad =

Figure in Cornish folklore

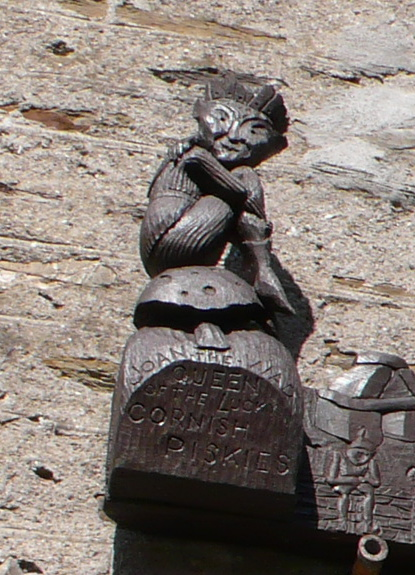
Figure of Joan the Wad above the "Joan the Wad and Piskey Shop" in Polperro, Cornwall

Joan the Wad is a mythological character in Cornish folklore. She is the Queen of the Pixies, which are tiny mythical creatures usually associated with the counties of Cornwall and Devon in England.

Wad is an Eastern Cornwall colloquial term for torch or bundle of straw.

== Folklore ==
Joan the Wad has been associated with Jack o' the Lantern, the King of the Pixies. The two may also be considered will-o'-the-wisp type characters who lead travellers astray on lonely moors, hence the rhyme:

Jack-the-lantern, Joan-the-wad,
That tickled the maid and made her mad,
Light me home, the weather's bad.

However, Joan is also thought to use her Wad (Torch) to light the way to safety and good luck, as another rhyme says, "Good fortune will nod, if you carry upon you Joan the Wad".

== Iconography ==
Joan the Wad is often depicted naked and associated with fire and water elements. In the last century, there was a thriving cottage industry in Joan the Wad lucky charms. People carried small figures of Joan the Wad for good luck: a small collection of such antique figures is housed at the Museum of Witchcraft in Boscastle. Her image also appears on door knockers to serve as a protective spirit.
