= William Stewart of Luthrie =

William Stewart of Luthrie (died 1569) was a Scottish herald and messenger. He was accused of plotting against Regent Moray using witchcraft and was executed.

== Career ==
William Stewart may have been a son of Alexander Stewart of Dalswinton. He was paid a £10 fee as a herald at the court of Mary, Queen of Scots, from Michaelmas term 1563 with a yearly stipend of £100 Scots, and was made Ross Herald in 1565 or 1566.

According to the chronicle known as the Diurnal of Occurrents, Stewart proclaimed the restoration of Matthew Stewart, 2nd Earl of Lennox, at Edinburgh's Mercat Cross on 22 September 1564. This paved the way for the Earl and his son Henry Stuart, Lord Darnley to come to Scotland. Another account of the proclamation says that five heralds and two macers officiated.

Stewart wrote a sonnet on the subject of the Church of Scotland, printed by Robert Lekprevik in the The Forme of Prayers (Edinburgh, 1565), and was paid for organising the translation of Protestant works for Scottish readers.

He was knighted as Sir William Stewart of Luthrie by James Stewart, 1st Earl of Moray, Regent Moray, on February 1568, and made Lyon King of Arms. Moray sent him twice as an envoy to Denmark. Stewart sought the rendition of James Hepburn, 4th Earl of Bothwell.

Stewart became involved in plots to free Mary, Queen of Scots, from Lochleven Castle and seems to have thought she would marry him. His co-conspirators included Gilbert Balfour and Patrick Bellenden of Stenness or Stenhouse. Stewart made a prophecies of Moray's death in Edinburgh in 1567. An English commander at Berwick-upon-Tweed, William Drury, wrote about rumours of a conspiracy and the role of "Wile Stewart, Kyng of heraulde" on 20 July 1568.

In 1568, Stewart fled to Dumbarton Castle (held by Mary's allies) but was captured in the town. He was then imprisoned in Edinburgh Castle. He wrote letters to Regent Moray in August 1568 and August 1569 declaring his innocence.

Stewart was put on trial in St Andrews and "being convicted for witcherie, wes burnt" on 15 September 1569. Around the same time, "French Paris", and a woman accused of witchcraft called "Nicnevin" were executed.
