= Robert Sempill the elder =

Robert Sempill (the elder) (c. 1530–1595), probably a cadet of illegitimate birth of the noble house of Sempill or Semple, was a Scottish ballad-writer and satirist.

Very little is known of Sempill's life. He was probably a soldier, and must have held some office at the Scottish court, as his name appears in the Lord Treasurer's books in February 1567 – 1568, and his writings show him to have had an intimate knowledge of court affairs. As a Protestant, he was a bitter opponent of Queen Mary and of the Catholic Church, authoring ballads supporting action against the queen. Sempill was present at the siege of Leith (1559-1560) and at the siege of Edinburgh Castle (1571), serving with the army of James Douglas, Earl of Morton. He was in Paris in 1572, but fled the country after the massacre of St Bartholomew. Three of his poems appear in the Bannatyne Manuscript.

== Ballads ==
His chief works are:

- The Ballat maid vpoun Margret Fleming callit the Flemyng bark
- The defence of Crissell Sande-landis
- The Claith Merchant or Ballat of Jonet Reid, ane Violet and Ane Quhyt, all three in the Bannatyne manuscript

They are characterized by extreme coarseness, and are probably among his earlier works. His chief political poems are:

- The Regentis Tragedie, a broadside of 1570
- The Sege of the Castel of Edinburgh (1573), interesting from an historical point of view
- Ane Complaint vpon fortoun ... (1581)
- The Legend of the Bischop of St Androis Lyfe callit Mr Patrik Adamsone (1583)

Some of his poems and ballads were intended to advance the cause of James VI during the Marian civil war. He was a mid-ranking Kings Party supporter, prominently known despite being outside of party leadership. He assuredly authored twelve poems out of a collection of twenty-five broadsides arguing against Queen Mary as a part of the Kings Party's political campaign, which collectively are known as the "Sempill ballads". Anonymous printed ballads such as The tressoun of Dumbertane, Robert Lekprevik, Edinburgh (1570), have been attributed to Sempill. The Tressoun describes Lord Fleming's failed ambush of the English commander William Drury at Dumbarton Castle.

See Chronicle of Scottish Poetry (ed. James Sibbald, Edinburgh, 1802); and Essays on the Poets of Renfrewshire by William Motherwell, in The Harp of Renfrewshire (Paisley, 1819; reprinted 1872).

Modern editions of Sempill are: Sege of the Castel of Edinburgh, a facsimile reprint with introduction by David Constable (1813); The Sempill Ballates (T. G. Stevenson, Edinburgh, 1872) containing all the poems; Satirical poems of the Reformation (ed. James Cranstoun, Scottish Text Soc., 2 vols, 1889-1893) with a memoir of Sempill and a bibliography of his poems.

== Drama ==
Sempill is known to have written two now lost dramas, a play performed before Regent Moray in 1568 and an entertainment for James VI at Dumbarton in 1581. Jamie Reid-Baxter has suggested that he may also have been the author, in 1566-7, of the Scots comedy Philotus.
