= Sacred Heart, Edinburgh =

Catholic church in Edinburgh Scotland

Coordinates: 55.945166°N 3.201296°W

Sacred Heart Church
- Catholic Church of the Sacred Heart of Jesus, Edinburgh
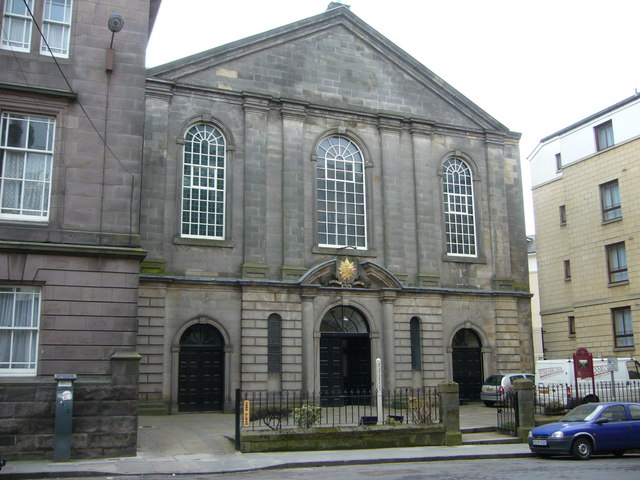
- Entrance of the church on Lauriston Street

- Edinburgh City Centre
- OS grid reference: NT 24981 73105
- Location: Edinburgh
- Country: Scotland
- Denomination: Roman Catholic
- Website: https://edinburghjesuit.org.uk/

History
- Status: Active
- Founded: 31 July 1859
- Founder: Bishop James Gillis
- Dedication: Sacred Heart of Jesus
- Dedicated: 1990
- Consecrated: 8 July 1860

Architecture
- Functional status: Parish church
- Heritage designation: Category A
- Designated: 14 December 1970
- Architect: Richard Vaughan SJ
- Style: Neo-classical
- Groundbreaking: 1859

Administration
- Province: St Andrews and Edinburgh
- Archdiocese: St Andrews and Edinburgh
- Deanery: City of Edinburgh

Clergy
- Archbishop: Leo Cushley
- Priest: Fr. Adrian Porter SJ

Sacred Heart, Edinburgh, formally known as the Catholic Church of the Sacred Heart of Jesus, is a Roman Catholic church run by the Society of Jesus, close to the city centre of Edinburgh, Scotland, United Kingdom. It is situated in Lauriston, midway between the Grassmarket and Tollcross, on the edge of Edinburgh’s historic Old Town. The church building was opened in 1860 and is a category A listed building.

== History ==
=== Founding ===
The church had its beginnings when Bishop James Gillis, Vicar Apostolic of the Eastern District, invited the Society of Jesus to come to Edinburgh and set up a parish close to the city centre. The architect of the church was a Jesuit priest, Fr. Richard Vaughan SJ, who was also uncle of Bernard Vaughan, a notable Jesuit preacher and writer.

Initially, while the church was being built, Mass was celebrated in a temporary chapel on Hunter's Close in the Grassmarket part of the city. The first Mass was on 31 July 1859 by Albany James Christie SJ. The first Mass in the newly constructed Sacred Heart Church was celebrated on 8 July 1860: Bishop Gillis preached at the Mass and the celebrant was the then Jesuit provincial, a Fr. Thomas Seed SJ.

=== Twentieth century ===
Over the years, the church was restored and renovated on numerous occasions. In 1907, the organ was installed and was modified in 1963 and 1974. In 1957, a mural was painted in the church above the altar. It was designed by Derek Clarke, a lecturer at the Edinburgh School of Art. From 1963 to 1990 there alterations made to make the church more compatible with the requirements of the post-Vatican II era, and the mural was covered over with wallpaper. There were renovations made with the structural trusses being reinforced in 1996 and north facing wall restored in 1998.

== Parish ==
The Jesuits are resident next door to the church and are involved with the chaplaincy to Edinburgh Royal Infirmary. The parish celebrates Mass every day of the week as well hosts saying the Rosary every weekday lunch time. In addition, the parish worked with the nearby Little Sisters of the Poor care home in Gilmore Place until it closed in 2018.

From 2017 the parishes in Edinburgh were organised into clusters to better coordinate their resources. Sacred Heart is one of four parishes in Cluster 4 along with St Columba's, St Peter's and St Mark's.

== Edinburgh Jesuit Centre ==
Next door to the church is the Edinburgh Jesuit Centre. It was originally called the Lauriston Centre. It was designed to be a place for the Edinburgh Jesuit Community to present issues of spirituality, social justice and adult faith formation to the city of Edinburgh and the surrounding area. It hosts talks on the spirituality of St. Ignatius of Loyola and modern day Jesuit writers and theologians. Speakers such as Michael L. Fitzgerald have been featured on topics such as Christian Muslim relations and the centre has been awarded for its efforts to advance the ecological agenda through a series of talks and events. On 30 November 2020, St Andrew's Day, during the COVID-19 pandemic, it was officially renamed the Edinburgh Jesuit Centre and began hosting series of talks concerning contemporary issues and the Catholic Church. Its first talk was by Sir Tom Devine on ‘The Social Emancipation of Scottish Catholics since 1945’. Subsequent series of talks during the Covid epidemic attracted record numbers of participants. These can be found on the EJC website.

== See also ==
- List of Jesuit sites in the United Kingdom
- List of Catholic churches in the United Kingdom
- Ignatian spirituality
