= James Gillis (bishop) =

The Right Reverend James Gillis
- Vicar Apostolic of the Eastern District
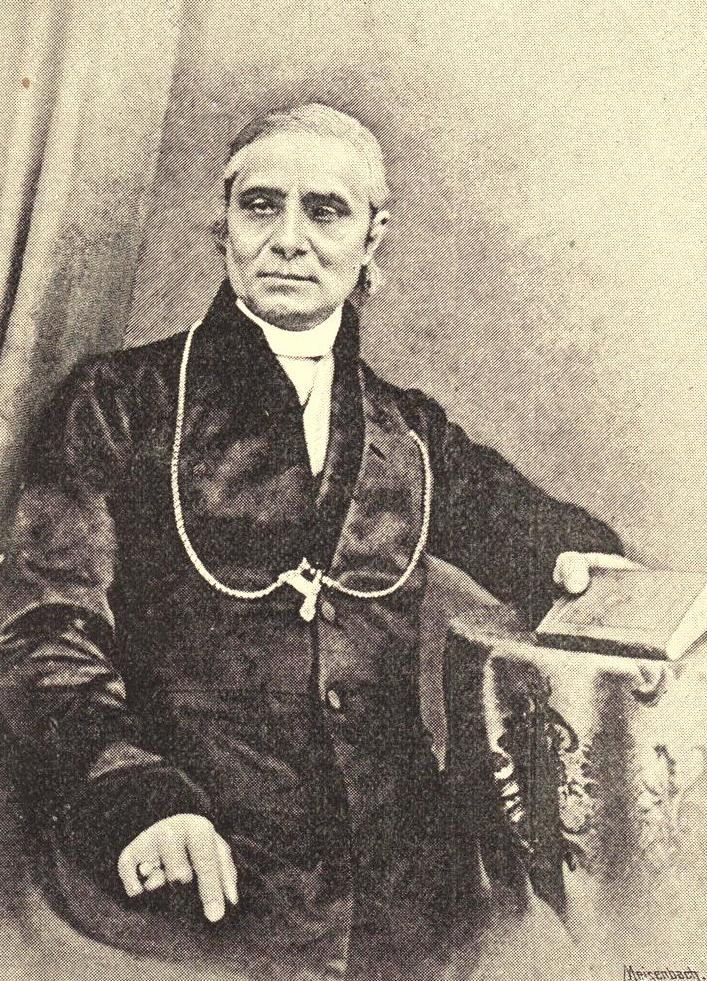
- Photograph from an 1897 publication
- Church: Roman Catholic
- In office: 1852–1864
- Predecessor: Andrew Carruthers
- Successor: John Strain
- Other posts: Titular bishop of Limyra (1837–64)
- Previous post: Coadjutor Vicar Apostolic of the Eastern District (1837–52)

Orders
- Ordination: 9 June 1827 by Alexander Paterson
- Consecration: 22 July 1838 by Augustine Baines

Personal details
- Born: 7 April 1802 Montreal, Upper Canada
- Died: 24 February 1864 (aged 61) Edinburgh, Scotland

James Gillis (7 April 1802 – 24 February 1864) was a Roman Catholic bishop who served as the Vicar Apostolic of the Eastern District of Scotland.

== Biography ==
Born in Montreal, Quebec, Canada on 7 April 1802, the son of a Scottish father and English mother, he came to Fochabers with his parents in 1816. The following year, he entered the Seminary of Aquhorties as an ecclesiastical student and a year later on 3 December 1818, on the instructions of Bishop Alexander Cameron, he and four companions set off from Aquhorties for Paris. Once there, he entered the Seminary of St Nicholas on 16 December 1818. He left St Nicholas in October 1823 and entered the Sulpician's Seminary of Issy, returning to Scotland in April 1826 after his health had given way. He was ordained a priest by Bishop Paterson at Aquhorties on 9 June 1827.

In 1831, John Menzies of Pitfodels, having, three years previously, bestowed on the Catholic Church in Scotland his extensive estate at Blairs, Aberdeenshire, where a seminary was built, came to reside permanently in Edinburgh and he persuaded Bishop Paterson to live with him at his home, 24 York Place. The Bishop took Gillis with him, as his secretary.

Gillis was appointed the Coadjutor Vicar Apostolic of the Eastern District and Titular Bishop of Limyra by the Holy See on 28 July 1837 and consecrated to the Episcopate on 22 July 1838. The principal consecrator was Bishop Peter Augustine Baines, and the principal co-consecrators were Bishop Andrew Scott and Bishop James Kyle.

Following the death of Bishop Andrew Carruthers on 24 May 1852, Gillis automatically succeeded as the Vicar Apostolic of the Eastern District of Scotland. Gillis died in office on 24 February 1864, aged 61.

=== St Margaret's Convent ===
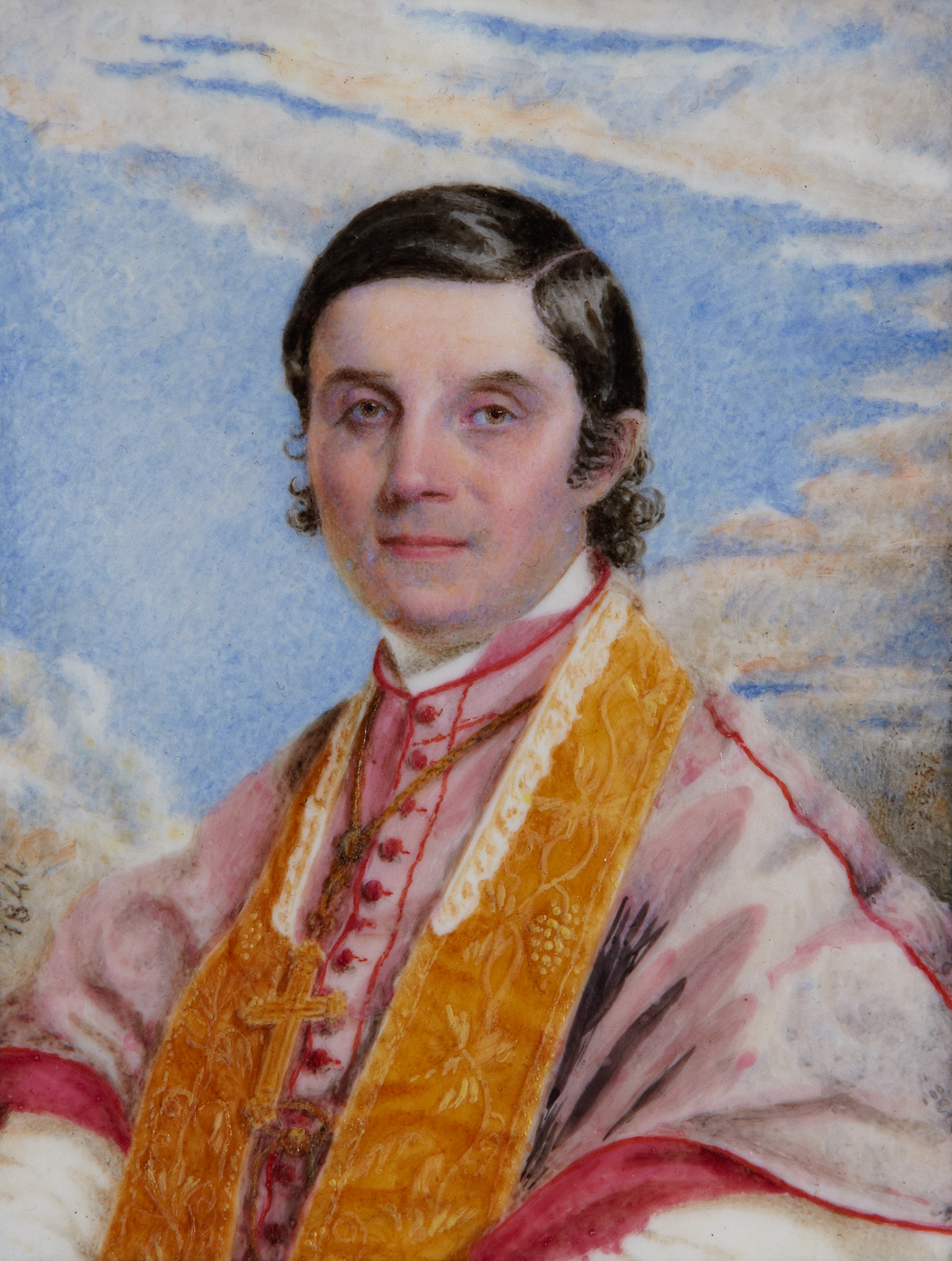
Bishop Gillis in 1841 by Sister Agnes Xavier

In the 1830s, the Roman Catholic Church in Scotland was not yet re-established. As a young priest, Gillis was sent by Bishop Paterson to the European continent to raise funds for a convent. On his journey via London, he was introduced to Ann Agnes Trail, the daughter of a minister of the Church of Scotland. Subsequently on his return to England, Miss Trail wrote to him offering herself as a member of his projected community. Miss Margaret Clapperton, who was to be one of the founding members of the community, came from Fochabers and had known James Gillis for much of her life. It was agreed that Miss Trail and Miss Clapperton should go together to Chavagnes, the Mother House of the Ursulines and they arrived there on 31 August 1833. In June 1834, Gillis bought Whitehouse, for his proposed convent with 2 acres of ground for £3,000 from Ann Oliphant.

The initial group of eleven Sisters comprising Miss Trail (now Sister Agnes Xavier), Miss Clapperton (now Sister Margaret Teresa), The Reverend Mother St Hilaire, Mother St Paula, Sister St Damian, Sister Alexis, Sister John Chrysostom, Sister Mary Emily, Sister Angelina and two lay Sisters (Sister Stephen and Sister Eustelle) then travelled to Scotland but had to live elsewhere for four months while the Convent was being made ready. On 26 December 1834, the community took possession of St Margaret's Convent, which was the first post-Reformation convent in Scotland.

At St Margaret's, arrangements had been made for the reception of young lady boarders, whose education was to be the principal work of the sisters. On 16 June 1835, the Feast of St Margaret, the new St Margaret's Chapel, which had been built alongside the Whitehouse Mansion House, was finished.

In 1863, this chapel went on to house a relic, given to them by Bishop Gillis, of St Margaret of Scotland.

For more than 150 years, until it closed in 1986, it was well known in Edinburgh as St Margaret's Convent and School under the ministry of the Ursulines.

Catholic Church titles
Preceded by Andrew Carruthers	Vicar Apostolic of the Eastern District; 1852–1864	Succeeded by John Menzies Strain
