= Gillis Centre =

Coordinates: 55.934924°N 3.200504°W

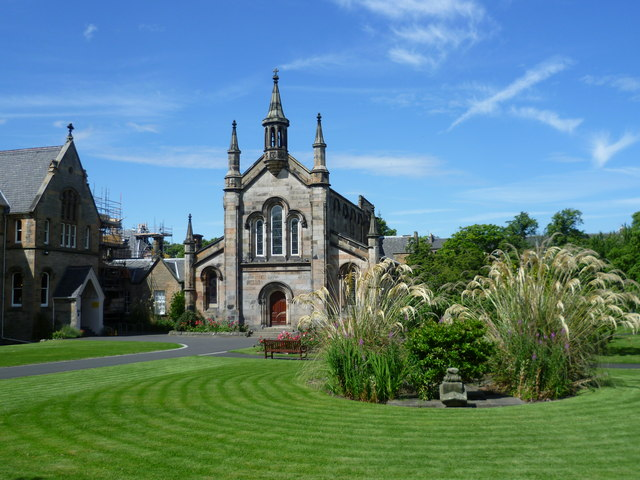
- Front of Gillis Centre showing St Margaret's Chapel

- Location of Gillis Centre within Edinburgh
- Location: Edinburgh
- Country: Scotland
- Denomination: Roman Catholic

History
- Former name(s): St Margaret's Convent, Gillis College
- Status: Conference and Accommodation Centre
- Founded: 1834
- Founder: Bishop Gillis
- Dedication: St Margaret of Scotland

Architecture
- Functional status: Active
- Heritage designation: Category A listed building
- Designated: 14 December 1970
- Architect(s): James Gillespie Graham and E. W. Pugin
- Style: Gothic Revival
- Completed: 1863

Administration
- Province: St Andrews and Edinburgh
- Archdiocese: Archdiocese of St Andrews and Edinburgh
- Deanery: St Giles' City of Edinburgh
- Parish: St Peter's, Morningside

Gillis Centre, formerly Gillis College and founded as St Margaret's Convent and School, is a complex of buildings situated close to the city centre of Edinburgh, Scotland. The history of the site can be traced back to the 15th century. The original building housed many literary figures of the 18th century, from 1834 it served as a convent and from 1986 to 1993 it was Gillis College, the seminary for the Roman Catholic Church in Scotland. It currently provides offices for the curia of the Archdiocese of St Andrews and Edinburgh.

The chapel is a Category A listed building, a building "of national or international importance". Other buildings are listed in lower categories.

The Archdiocese of St Andrews & Edinburgh announced on 24th April 2026 that The Gillis Centre complex is to be put on the market for sale.

== Early history ==
=== Whitehouse ===
The site of the present Gillis Centre was originally known as 'Whitehouse' and gave its name to the lane that runs alongside it, Whitehouse Loan. The house had many literary and academic occupants and must have had a connection with the University of Edinburgh, because it was there that some of the university's leading figures wrote various pieces of literature, such as Principal Robertson who wrote his The History and Reign of Charles V in 1769. In 1756 John Home wrote his tragedy Douglas there and in 1783 Hugh Blair wrote his Lectures.

=== St Margaret's Convent ===
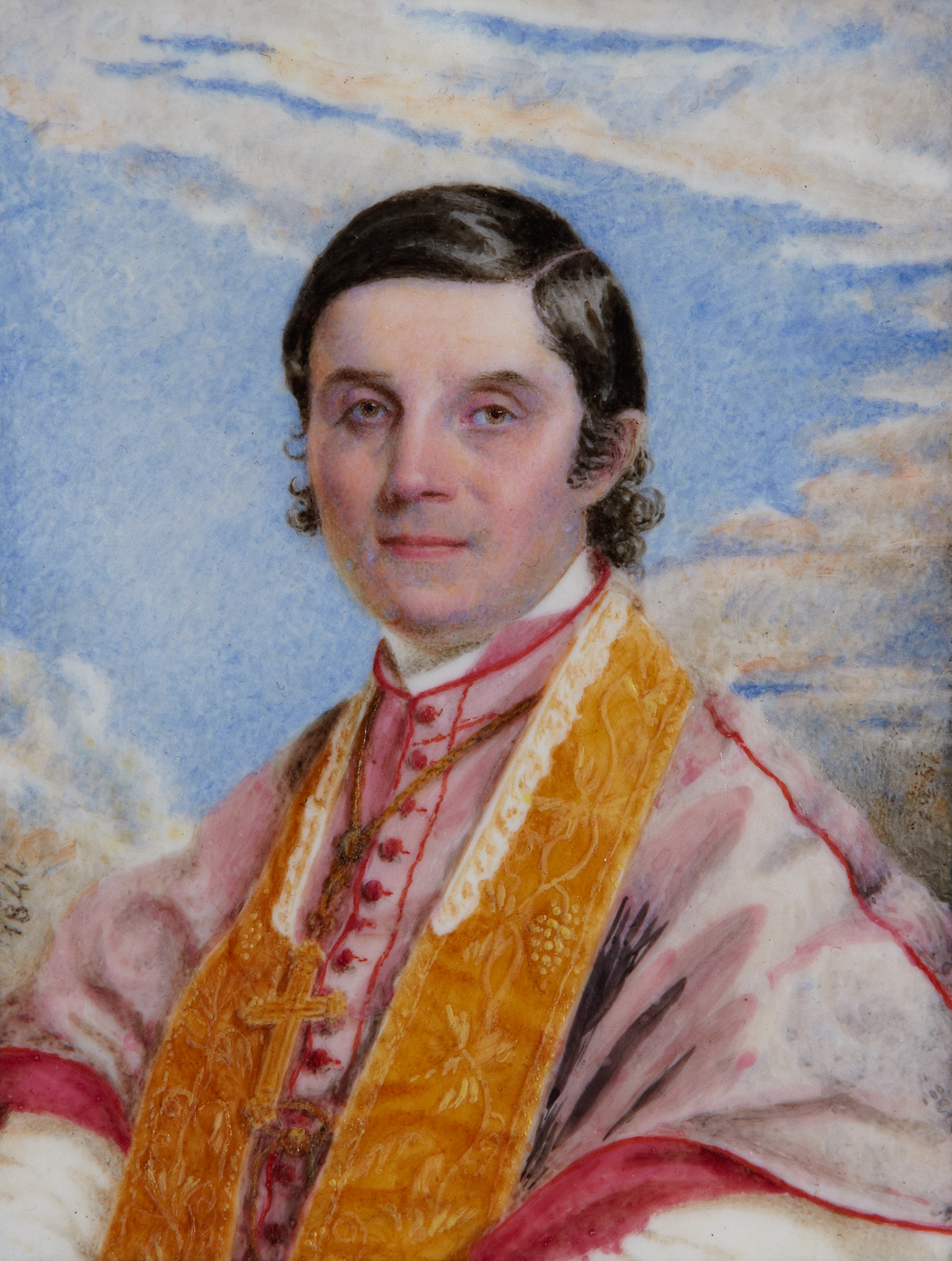
Bishop Gillis in 1841 by Agnes Xavier Trail

In the 1830s, the Roman Catholic Church in Scotland was not yet re-established. James Gillis, before he became a bishop, was sent by Bishop Paterson to the Continent to raise funds to establish a convent. On his journey via London, he was introduced to Ann Agnes Trail, the daughter of a minister of the established Church of Scotland. Subsequently on his return to England, Miss Trail wrote to him offering herself as a member of his projected community. Miss Margaret Clapperton, who was to be one of the founding members of the community, came from Fochabers and had known James Gillis for much of her life. It was agreed that Miss Trail and Miss Clapperton should go together to Chavagnes, the Mother House of the Ursulines and they arrived there on 31 August 1833. In June 1834, James Gillis bought a house, Whitehouse, for his proposed convent with 2 acres of ground for £3,000 from Ann Oliphant. The initial group of eleven Sisters comprising Miss Trail (now Sister Agnes Xavier), Miss Clapperton (now Sister Margaret Teresa), The Reverend Mother St Hilaire, Mother St Paula, Sister St Damian, Sister Alexis, Sister John Chrysostom, Sister Mary Emily, Sister Angelina and two lay Sisters, Sister Stephen and Sister Eustelle then travelled to Scotland but had to live elsewhere for four months while the Convent was being made ready. On 26 December 1834, the community took possession of St Margaret's Convent, which was the first post-Reformation convent in Scotland. At St Margaret's, arrangements had been made for the reception of young lady boarders, whose education was to be the principal work of the sisters. On 16 June 1835, the Feast of St Margaret, the new St Margaret's Chapel was opened. It was built alongside the Whitehouse Mansion House. In 1863, Bishop Gillis gave a relic of St Margaret of Scotland to the chapel. For over 150 years, until it was closed in 1986, it was known in Edinburgh as St Margaret's Convent and School and it was under the ministry of the Ursulines.

=== Chapel ===
The chapel dedicated to St Margaret of Scotland was designed by James Gillespie Graham (probably under significant influence from A. W. N. Pugin) and opened in 1835. Additions are by Archibald Macpherson, 1893-5. It is an aisled neo-Norman chapel with a later apsidal gothic east end.

From the same period, the gatehouse and convent building were also by James Gillespie Graham, and E. W. Pugin (son of A. W. N. Pugin) designed the school building which was completed in 1863.

== Gillis College ==
In 1986, St Margaret's Convent School was closed. The Ursulines moved to St Margaret's Tower, 88 Strathern Road, which was adjoining the school site, where they remained until the property was sold in 2010. St Margaret's Convent was still owned in part by the Trustees of the Bishop Gillis Trust and in part by the Trustees of St Margaret's Convent. In 1986, the seminary at St Andrew's College, Drygrange was moved to St Margaret's and it became Gillis College, after Bishop James Gillis. On 29 January 1988, the two remaining trustees of the Bishop Gillis Trust, the Archbishop of St Andrews and Edinburgh Keith O'Brien, and Edward Provost Mohan, the Provost of the Chapter of the Archdiocese of St Andrews and Edinburgh transferred without any payment the lands and buildings to the Trustees of the Archdiocese of St Andrews and Edinburgh. Gillis College was the senior seminary of the archdiocese for the training of students for the priesthood and accepted seminarians from the dioceses of the Province of St Andrews and Edinburgh. In 1993, the theological college closed and the remaining students were sent to Bearsden, Glasgow, where the Scottish bishops had decided to have a National Seminary of Scotland, called Scotus College.

== Gillis Centre ==
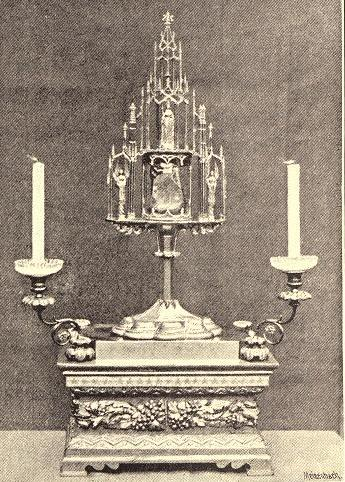
1897 picture of the St Margaret reliquary

After the college closed the complex became the Gillis Centre, the Archdiocesan offices and agencies moved into the buildings and work began on developing a conference centre with residential accommodation. The Gillis Centre offered bed and breakfast accommodation until it was closed by the Trustees of the Archdiocese of St Andrews and Edinburgh on 30 November 2017.

The Gillis Centre provides office accommodation for various diocesan commissions, bodies and organisations. In addition, it houses the theological library from the former Gillis College. The Diocesan Pastoral Office was closed by Archbishop Leo Cushley on 30 November 2017, with most of its functions being transferred to five priests who were given appointments as episcopal vicars.

On 16 November 2008, the relic of St Margaret of Scotland that was given to the chapel was returned to St Margaret's Memorial Church in Dunfermline, Fife.

== Gallery ==
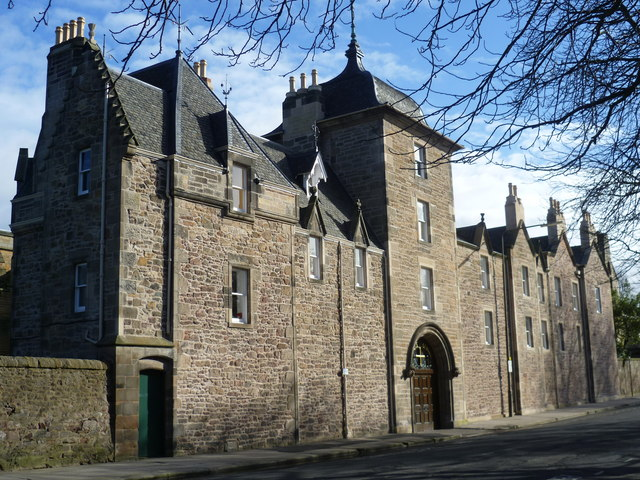
View from Whitehouse Loan

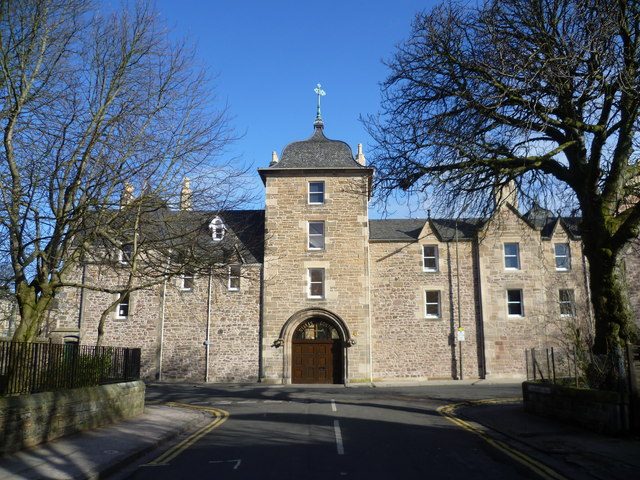
View from St Margaret's Road
