= James Gordon (vicar apostolic) =

The Right Reverend James Gordon
- Vicar Apostolic of the Lowland District
- Church: Roman Catholic Church
- Appointed: 23 July 1727
- Term ended: 1 March 1746
- Predecessor: office established
- Successor: Alexander Smith
- Other post: Titular bishop of Nicopolis (1705–1746)
- Previous posts: Vicar Apostolic of Scotland (1718–1727); Coadjutor Vicar Apostolic of Scotland (1705–1718)

Orders
- Ordination: 1692
- Consecration: 11 April 1706 by Marcantonio Barbarigo

Personal details
- Born: 31 January 1665 Glastirum, Enzie, Banffshire, Kingdom of Scotland
- Died: 18 February 1746 (aged 81) Thornhill, Perthshire, Scotland
- Buried: Innerpeffray

James Gordon (31 January 1665 – 18 February 1746) was a Roman Catholic bishop who served as the Vicar Apostolic for the whole of Scotland from 1718 to 1727, then the Vicar Apostolic of the Lowland District from 1727 to 1746.

== Life ==
Born in Glastirum, Enzie, Banffshire on 31 January 1665, he was ordained a priest in 1692. In 1702 Gordon was the Roman agent for the Scottish clergy and in 1703 was proctor for the English Vicars Apostolic as well as the Scottish Vicar Apostolic.

He was appointed the Coadjutor Vicar Apostolic of Scotland and Titular Bishop of Nicopolis ad Iaterum by the Holy See on 21 August 1705. Owing to the severity of the persecution of Scottish Catholics at the time, great pains were taken to keep Gordon's appointment and consecration secret. He was consecrated to the Episcopate in Montefiascone by order of Pope Clement XI, northwest of Rome, on 11 April 1706. The principal consecrator was Cardinal Marcantonio Barbarigo, and the principal co-consecrators were Giuseppe Cianti and Onofrio Elisei. Following the death of Bishop Nicolson on 12 October 1718, he automatically succeeded as the Vicar Apostolic of Scotland. In 1720 Gordon wrote to the Propaganda recommending John Wallace be appointed coadjutor to which the Pope assented.

Upon the insistence of Gordon and Wallace, Scotland was divided into the Lowland and Highland Districts on 23 July 1727. James Gordon was appointed the Vicar Apostolic of Lowland District with John Wallace being the coadjutor therein.

He died in office on 18 February 1746, aged 81. He was buried at Innerpeffray and bequeathed books and funds to the Scalan seminary.

Catholic Church titles
Preceded by Thomas Joseph Nicolson	Vicar Apostolic of Scotland; 1718–1727	Title name changed
New title	Vicar Apostolic of the Lowland District; 1727–1746	Succeeded by Alexander Smith
