= Andrew Carruthers =

Scottish bishop (1770–1852)

The Right Reverend Andrew Carruthers
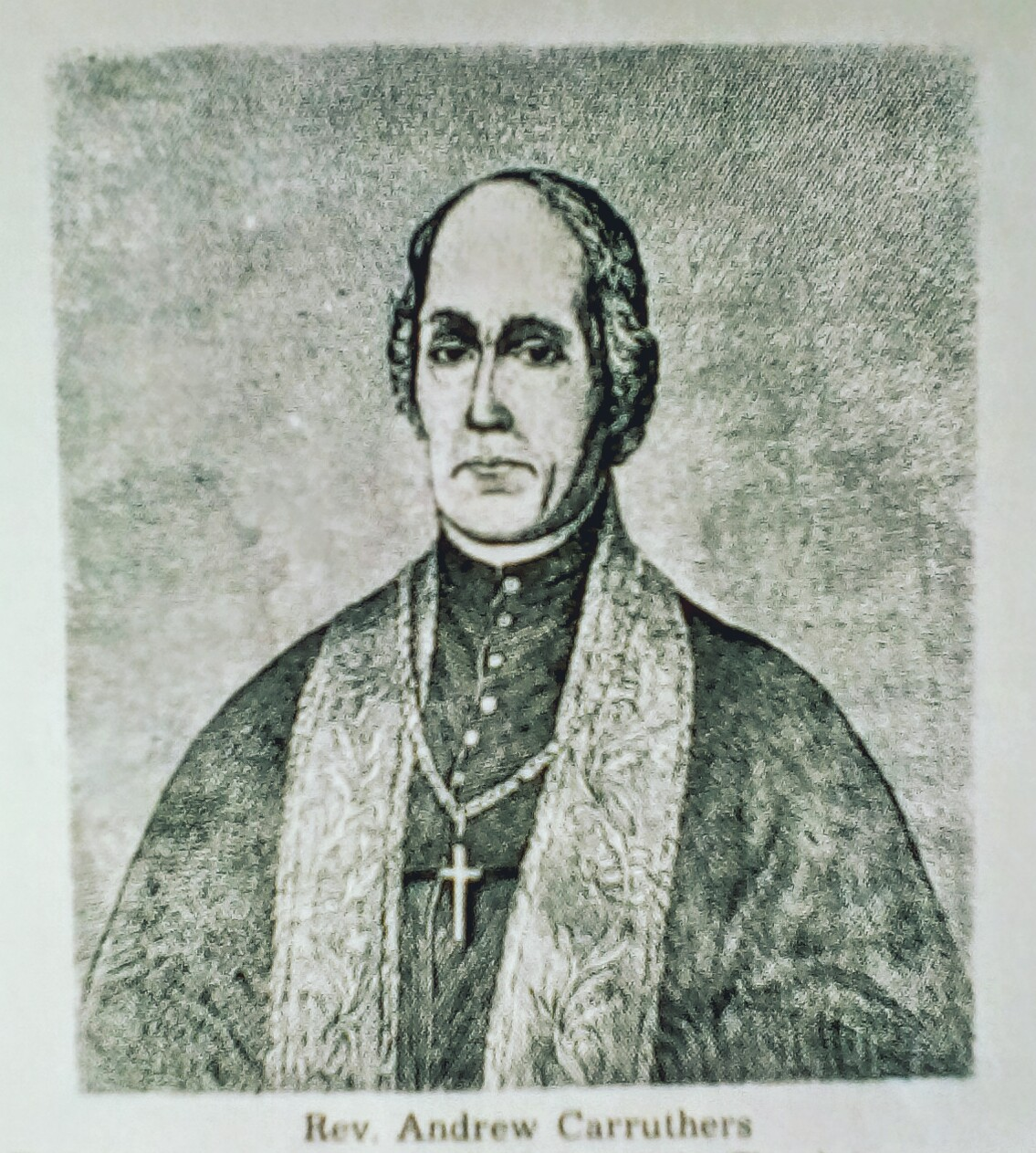
- Church: Roman Catholic
- Appointed: 28 September 1832
- Term ended: 24 May 1852
- Predecessor: Alexander Paterson
- Successor: James Gillis
- Other post: Titular Bishop of Ceramus (1832–52)

Orders
- Ordination: 25 March 1795 by George Hay
- Consecration: 13 January 1833 by Thomas Penswick

Personal details
- Born: 7 February 1770 Drumillan Miln, New Abbey, Kirkcudbrightshire, Scotland
- Died: 24 May 1852 (aged 82) Dundee, Scotland
- Buried: St Mary's Cathedral, Edinburgh
- Education: Scots College, Douai

Andrew Carruthers (7 February 1770 – 24 May 1852) was a Roman Catholic bishop who served as the Vicar Apostolic of the Eastern District of Scotland.

== Biography ==
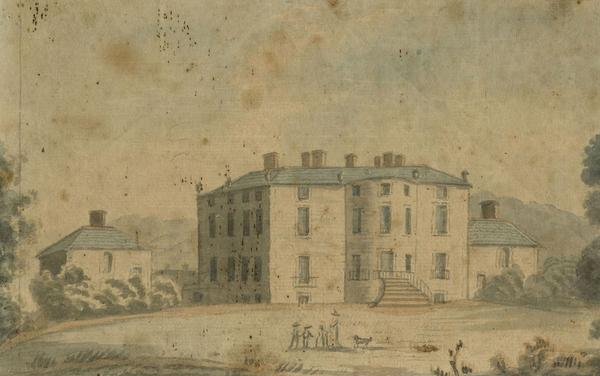
Munches House, Dalbeattie, Kirkcudbrightshire in 1797

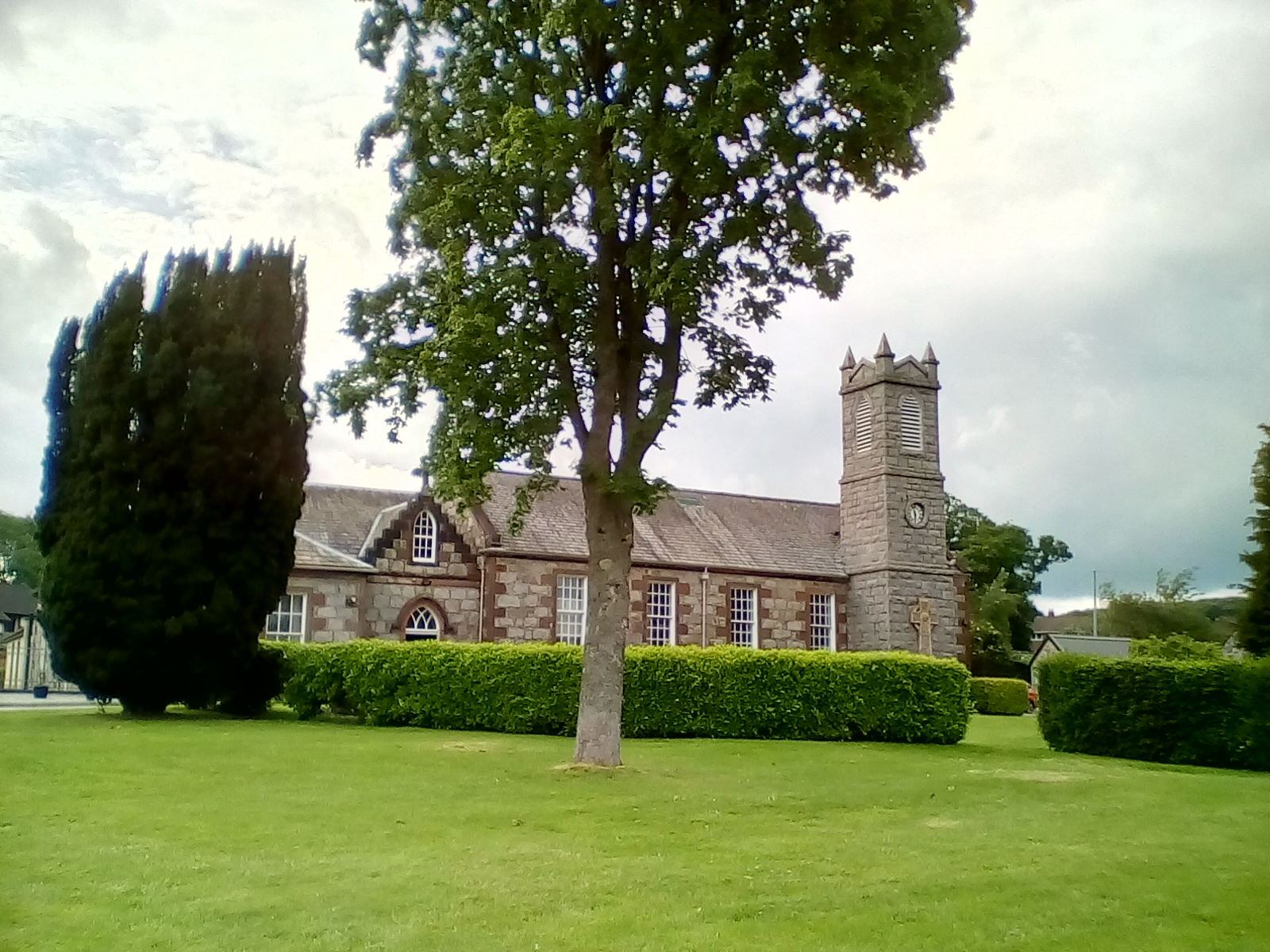
St Peter's Catholic Church, Dalbeattie, Kirkcudbrightshire

Born in Drumillan Miln near New Abbey in Kirkcudbrightshire on 7 February 1770, he was the son of Catholic parents, Andrew Carruthers and his wife Lucy Rigg. The priest and historian James Carruthers was his brother.

Carruthers was ordained a priest on 25 March 1795. He was stationed first to the missionary station at Balloch on the Drummond Castle estate, in Perthshire, then in 1797 appointed as the chaplain to the Earl of Traquair at the Stuart family seat Traquair in Peeblesshire, and 1800 he moved to the mission at Munches, seat of the Maxwells at Dalbeattie in his native Kirkcudbrightshire.

Using a bequest from the late Agnes Maxwell, who died in 1809, the last of the Catholic Maxwells of Munches he built St Peter's Church in Dalbeattie which opened in 1814. On 29 June 2014 it celebrated its 200th anniversary.

He was appointed the Vicar Apostolic of the Eastern District and Titular Bishop of Ceramus by the Holy See on 28 September 1832. He was consecrated to the Episcopate on 13 January 1833. The principal consecrator was Bishop Thomas Penswick, Vicar Apostolic of the Northern District of England, and the principal co-consecrators were Bishop Andrew Scott and Bishop James Kyle. He died in office on 24 May 1852, aged 82. He was buried in St Mary's, now the cathedral in Edinburgh.

Catholic Church titles
Preceded by Alexander Paterson	Vicar Apostolic of the Eastern District; 1832–1852	Succeeded by James Gillis
