= Mascaron =

Mascaron may refer to:

- Mascaron (architecture), a decorative element in the form of a sculpted face or head of a human being or an animal
- Jules Mascaron, French preacher
