= Restoration of the Catholic hierarchy =

Restoration of the Catholic hierarchy may refer to:

- Restoration of the English hierarchy
- Restoration of the Scottish hierarchy
