= John Strain (bishop) =

Scottish Roman Catholic clergyman (1810-1883)

The Most Reverend John Menzies Strain
- Archbishop of St Andrews and Edinburgh
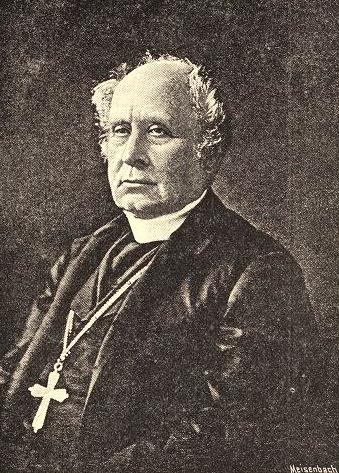
- in 1897 publication
- Church: Roman Catholic
- Archdiocese: St. Andrews and Edinburgh
- Installed: 1878
- Term ended: 1883
- Successor: William Smith
- Previous posts: Vicar Apostolic of the Eastern District and Titular Bishop of Abila Lysaniae (1864–1878)

Orders
- Ordination: 9 June 1833 (Priest)
- Consecration: 25 September 1864 (Bishop) by Pope Pius IX

Personal details
- Born: 8 December 1810 Edinburgh, Scotland
- Died: 2 July 1883 (aged 72) Edinburgh, Scotland
- Parents: Hugh Strain and Cecilia Strain (née McKenzie)
- Education: Pontifical Scots College
- Motto: Nisi Dominus frustra

John Menzies Strain (8 December 1810 – 2 July 1883) was a Roman Catholic clergyman who served as the first Archbishop of the Metropolitan see of St. Andrews and Edinburgh, Scotland.

== Early life ==
Born in Edinburgh on 8 December 1810, he was the son of Hugh Strain and Cecilia Strain (née McKenzie). He was educated at Edinburgh High School, the Seminary in Aquhorties, Aberdeenshire, and the Scots College in Rome.

== Priestly career ==
He was ordained to the priesthood on 9 June 1833. He left Rome on 3 August 1833, returning to Scotland, where he served at St Mary's, Edinburgh for two months, then appointed an assistant at Dumfries. He was appointed to take charge of the mission at St Peter's Church in Dalbeattie on 17 March 1835, which included the greater part of Kirkcudbrightshire. He returned to Dumfries in 1857 to take charge of the mission there. In 1859, he became the President of St Mary's College, Blairs, Aberdeen.

== Episcopal career ==
He was appointed the Vicar Apostolic of the Eastern District and Titular Bishop of Abila Lysaniae by the Holy See on 2 September 1864 and consecrated to the Episcopate at the Vatican on 25 September 1864. The principal consecrator was Pope Pius IX, and the principal co-consecrators were Cardinal Giuseppe Berardi and Archbishop François Marinelli. He participated in the First Vatican Council.

He laboured long and strenuously for the restoration of the Scottish hierarchy; and it was greatly due to his effects that the restoration took place, under Pope Leo XIII, on 15 March 1878. The Eastern District was elevated to the Archdiocese of St Andrews and Edinburgh, with John Menzies Strain appointed as its first archbishop. A few years later, he held the first diocesan synod in 1881.

During his nineteen years' episcopate he saw the number of clergy and missions increase during his tenure; many new schools were opened, and several religious communities, both of men and women, introduced.

He died in Edinburgh on 2 July 1883, aged 72.

== Sources ==
- Catholic Directory for Scotland (1884), 169-80;
- The Tablet, LXI (7 July 1883), 26.

Catholic Church titles
Preceded by James Gillis	Vicar Apostolic of the Eastern District; 1864–1878	Title elevated
New creation	Archbishop of St Andrews and Edinburgh; 1878–1883	Succeeded by William Smith
