= James Grant (Scottish bishop) =

Scottish priest, bishop and missionary (1706-1778)

The Right Reverend James Grant
- Vicar Apostolic of the Lowland District
- Church: Roman Catholic Church
- In office: 1767–1778
- Predecessor: Alexander Smith
- Successor: George Hay
- Other posts: Titular Bishop of Sinitis (1755–1778)

Orders
- Ordination: 4 April 1733 by Giovanni Antonio Guadagni
- Consecration: 13 November 1755 by Alexander Smith

Personal details
- Born: July 1706 Wester Boggs, Enzie, Banffshire, Scotland
- Died: 3 December 1778 (aged 72) Aberdeen, Scotland
- Buried: Snow Kirk, Aberdeen
- Education: Pontifical Scots College

James Grant (July 1706 – 3 December 1778) was a Scottish priest and bishop who served as a missionary for the illegal and underground Catholic Church in Scotland upon the Isle of Barra and later as the vicar apostolic of the Lowland District.

== Life ==
Born in Wester Boggs, Enzie, Banffshire in July 1706, he entered the Scots College Rome on 16 January 1726 and took the mission oath on 25 July 1725. He was ordained a priest in Rome on 4 April 1733.

During the Jacobite Uprising of 1745, Grant was operating as the underground missionary priest of Barra, in the Outer Hebrides.

According to Bishop John Geddes, "Early in the spring of 1746, some ships of war came to the coast of the isle of Barra and landed some men, who threatened they would lay desolate the whole island if the priest was not delivered up to them. Father James Grant, who was missionary then, and afterwards Bishop, being informed of the threats in a safe retreat in which he was in a little island, surrendered himself, and was carried prisoner to Mingarry Castle on the Western coast (i.e. Ardnamurchan) where he was detained for some weeks. He was then conveyed to Inverness, and thrown into the common prison, where there were about forty prisoners in the same room with him. Here he was for several weeks chained by the leg to Mr. MacMahon, an Irish officer in the service of Spain, who had come over to be of use to the Prince. In this situation they could not in the night time turn from one side to the other without the one passing the other. The people of the town, out of humanity, furnished them with some little conveniences, and among other things gave to each a bottle, which they hung out of the window in the morning and got filled with water. But one morning the sentinels accused the prisoners to the visiting officer of having entered into a conspiracy to knock them on the head with bottles, which they had procured for that purpose. Father Grant and the others pleaded the improbability of this ridiculous accusation, but they were not heard, and the bottles were taken away."

Accord to Father Charles MacDonald, "Five other priests were shut up in the same prison at about the same time. Three of them belonged to the West coast, viz., Father Alexander Cameron, who was connected with the Lochiel family; Father Alexander Forrester, priest of South Uist; and Father Alan MacDonald. From Inverness they were taken away on board a man-of-war to London; but... Father Cameron, whose health had been completely shattered during his captivity, died... After a long confinement in London, the survivors were brought before the Duke of Newcastle, who informed them that the Government was disposed to deal leniently in their case, and therefore would sentence them to perpetual banishment from the country, provided they could give bail of £1,000 that they would never return. As this was an absurd proposal, these poor priests having neither friends nor money, the Duke compromised the matter by asking them to go bail for each other. They got over to Holland, but most of them came back again."

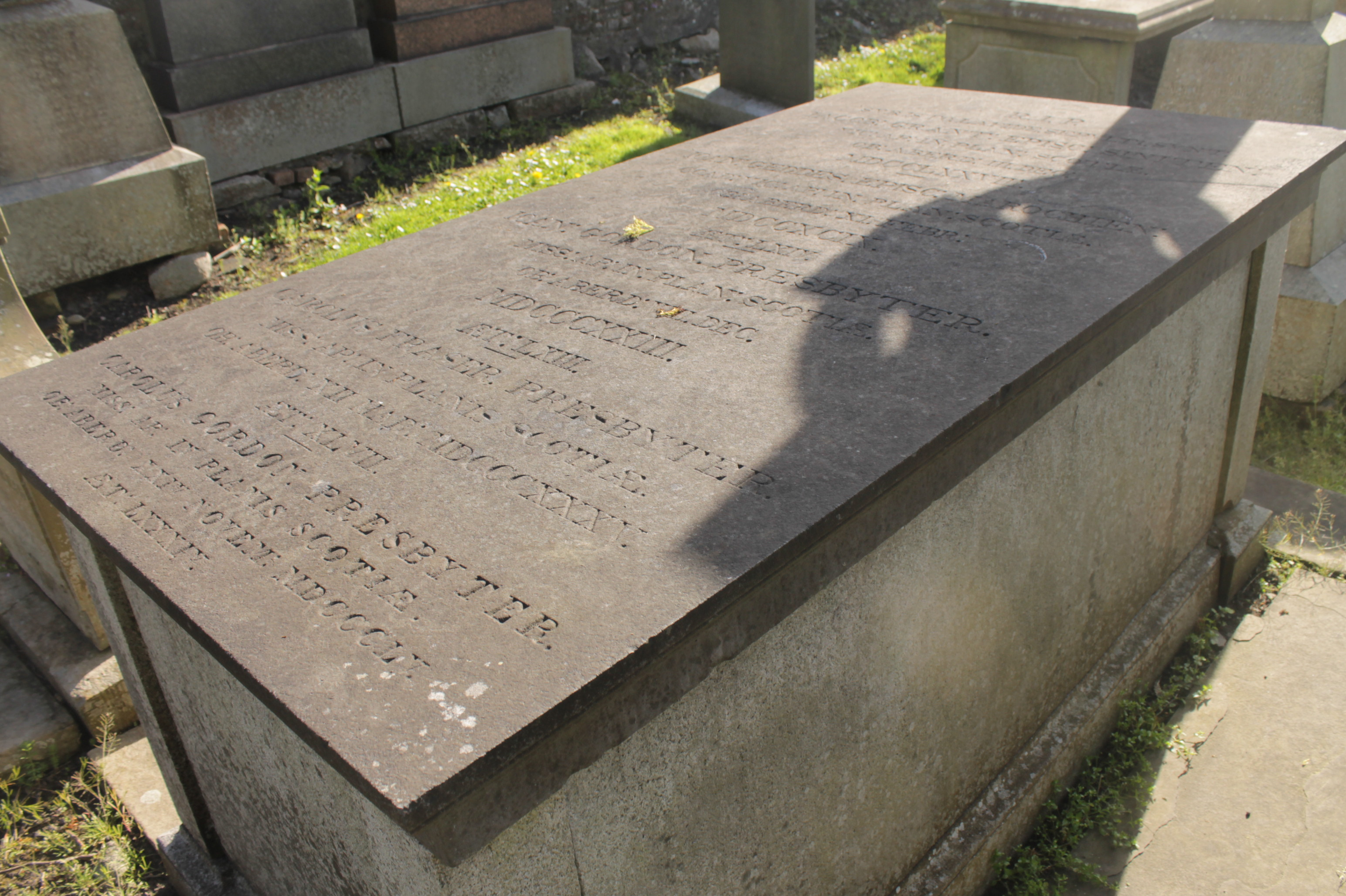
The grave of Bishops James Grant and John Geddes, Snow Kirk, Old Aberdeen.

On 21 February 1755, Grant was appointed by the Holy See as the coadjutor vicar apostolic of the Lowland District and Titular Bishop of Sinitis. He was consecrated to the episcopate at Edinburgh on 13 November 1755. The principal consecrator was Bishop Alexander Smith and the principal co-consecrator was Bishop Hugh MacDonald. On the death of Bishop Smith on 21 August 1767, Grant automatically succeeded him as the vicar apostolic of the Lowland District. He died in office on 3 December 1778, aged 72. He is buried with Bishop John Geddes in the ruins of the Snow Kirk in Old Aberdeen.

Catholic Church titles
Preceded by Alexander Smith	Vicar Apostolic of the Lowland District; 1767–1778	Succeeded by George Hay
