= Sir George Nicolson, Lord Kemnay =

Scottish judge

Sir George Nicolson, Lord Kemnay (1637–1711) was a Scottish judge and Senator of the College of Justice.

== Life ==
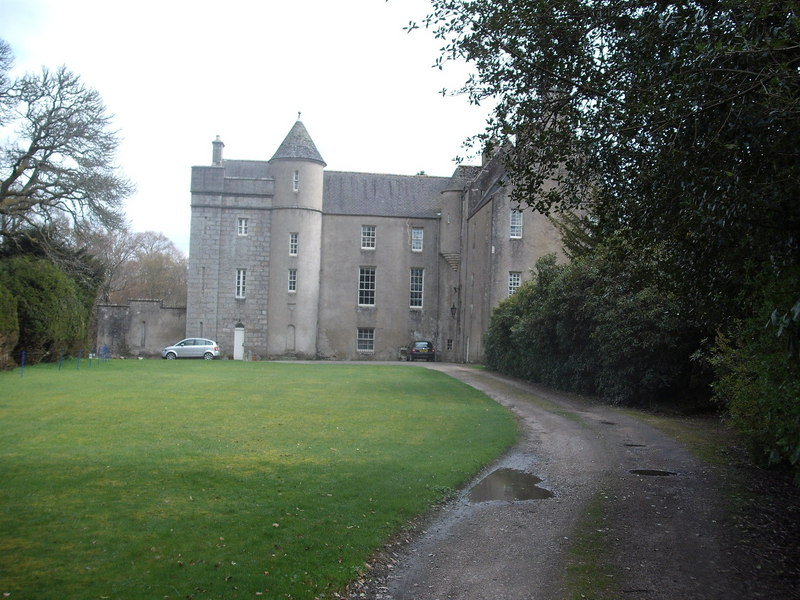
Kemnay House

He was born in Aberdeen the son of Thomas Nicolsone, merchant, and his wife, Elizabeth Abercrombie of Birkenbog. He was baptised in the Kirk of St Nicholas, Aberdeen on 28 February 1637. His younger brother was Thomas Nicolson.

He studied Law at King's College, Aberdeen and acted as "Civilist" to the university for several years. He qualified as an advocate in 1661 and was then known as George Nicolson of Cluny.

In 1682 he purchased Kemnay House and estate from Alexander Strachan of Glenkindie.

On 5 July 1682 he was created a Senator of the College of Justice and adopted the title Lord Kemnay.

In 1688 he sold the Kemnay estate to Thomas Burnett, however he did not change his title. In 1689 he bought the Balcaskie estate. Thomas Burnett died after only one year at Kemnay but the house remained with his family for many centuries. His son Thomas was created a Nova Scotia Baronet in April 1700.

George died in Edinburgh on 8 February 1711.

== Family ==
In 1663 he married Margaret Halyburton in Edinburgh, and their children included:

- Sir Thomas Nicolson of Kemnay and Glenbervie (d.1728)
- Sir William Nicolson of Glenbervie (1673-1766)
