= Thomas Nicolson (bishop) =

Roman Catholic bishop in Scotland

The Right Reverend Thomas Nicolson
- Vicar Apostolic of Scotland
- Church: Roman Catholic Church
- Appointed: 7 September 1694
- Term ended: 12 October 1718
- Predecessor: office established
- Successor: James Gordon
- Other post: Titular Bishop of Peristasis

Orders
- Ordination: 9 March 1686
- Consecration: 27 February 1695 by Jules Mascaron

Personal details
- Born: c. 1645 Birkenbog, Banffshire, Scotland
- Died: 12 October 1718 (aged c. 73) Preshome, Scotland
- Education: University of Aberdeen

Thomas Joseph Nicolson (c. 1645 – 12 October 1718) was a Roman Catholic bishop who served as the Vicar Apostolic of Scotland.

== Life ==
=== Early life ===
Born in Birkenbog, Banffshire in 1645, he was the son of Thomas Nicolsone, merchant, and his wife, Elizabeth Abercrombie of Birkenbog. His older brother was Sir George Nicolson, Lord Kemnay. He was raised an Episcopalian and studied at the University of Aberdeen matriculating in 1660. He became a regent (i.e. professor) of the University of Glasgow. He would not comply with the Test Act passed by the Scottish Parliament in 1681, and was removed from his position at the University of Glasgow. He converted to the Roman Catholic Church in 1682.

=== Priesthood ===
Nicolson was appointed to the staff at the episcopal seminary of Padua, and later decided to become a priest himself. He was prefect of studies there from 1685 to 1687, and was ordained a priest on 9 March 1686. He then returned to the Glasgow on mission, and was imprisoned in Stirling Castle at the time of the Glorious Revolution. He was exiled to France, where he became chaplain to English Benedictine nuns at Dunkirk.

=== Bishop ===
There was a need for a superior in Scotland with the authority over the secular and regular clergy, and following the Glorious Revolution the Church was left in further chaos. In response, Pope Innocent XII established an Apostoltic Vicariate for Scotland, and appointed Nicolson the vicar apostolic of Scotland and Titular Bishop of Peristasis on 7 September 1694. He was consecrated to the Episcopate in secret at Paris on 27 February 1695. The principal consecrator was Bishop Jules Mascaron of Agen, and the principal co-consecrators were Bishop Henri de Barillon of Luçon and Bishop Martin de Ratabon of Ypres. Unable to travel to Scotland immediately, he secured the submission of the Abbots of the Scottish monasteries at Würzburg and Ratisbon. He set up residence at Preshome and divided the Scottish mission into administrative districts. He received the submission of the Scottish Jesuits at Aberdeen in 1701. On 11 March 1704 he ordained Peter Fraser, the first priestly ordination in Scotland since the reformation.

He was imprisoned after the Jacobite rising of 1715, but was later released. He died in office on 12 October 1718, aged 73.

Catholic Church titles
Preceded by Alexander Dunbar Winchester (prefect apostolic)	Vicar Apostolic of Scotland; 1694–1718	Succeeded by James Gordon
