= George Hay (bishop) =

Catholic bishop in Scotland

The Right Reverend George Hay
- Vicar Apostolic of the Lowland District
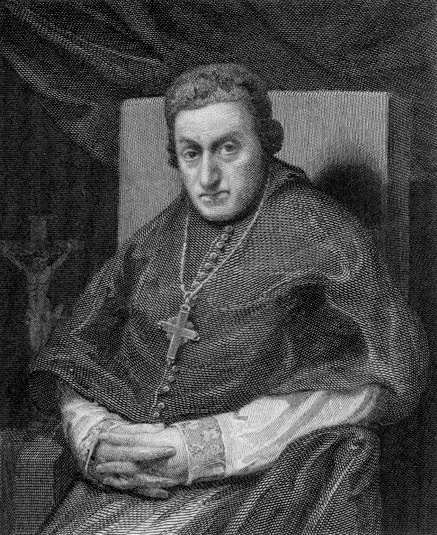
- Church: Catholic Church
- Appointed: 3 December 1778
- Term ended: 24 August 1805
- Predecessor: James Grant
- Successor: Alexander Cameron
- Other post: Titular Bishop of Daulia
- Previous post: Coadjutor Vicar Apostolic of Lowland District (1768–1778)

Orders
- Ordination: 2 April 1758 by Giuseppe Spinelli
- Consecration: 21 May 1769 by James Grant

Personal details
- Born: 24 August 1729 Edinburgh
- Died: 15 October 1811 (aged 82) Aquhorthies
- Denomination: Catholic
- Education: University of Edinburgh

George Hay (24 August 1729 – 15 October 1811) was a Scottish Catholic prelate and writer who served as Vicar Apostolic of the Lowland District from 1778 to 1805.

== Biography ==
=== Early life ===
Hay was born in Edinburgh on 24 August 1729. His parents, James Hay and Mary Morrison, were Jacobites and members of the Scottish Episcopal Church; James Hay had been involved in the Jacobite rising of 1715. George Hay began his studies at the University of Edinburgh, intending to pursue a medical career.

During the Jacobite rising of 1745, when he was sixteen, Hay was summoned to attend wounded soldiers after the battle of Prestonpans. He afterwards followed the victorious Jacobite army of Charles Edward Stuart for some months; but before the decisive fight at Culloden, illness compelled him to return to Edinburgh.

=== Conversion to Catholicism ===
Hay was later arrested for having participated in the rising, and after three months of imprisonment in Edinburgh Castle, he was taken to London, where he was kept in custody for another twelve months. There he met a bookseller, Thomas Meighan, who first introduced Hay to Catholicism. On his return to Scotland, Hay retreated to East Kilbride to avoid the authorities, where he studied John Gother's work, The Papist Represented and Misrepresented. An introduction to John Seaton, a Jesuit missionary at Edinburgh, was followed by a prolonged course of instruction, and Hay was received into the Catholic Church, making his First Communion on 21 December 1749, at the age of 20.

As a Catholic, Hay was now debarred by the penal laws from graduating or receiving his medical diploma. He joined the Royal Medical Society and spent some time running an apothecary's shop in Edinburgh, before accepting an appointment as surgeon on a trading vessel bound for the Mediterranean. While in London, on his way to join his ship, he became acquainted with Richard Challoner, Vicar Apostolic of the London District. The result of their intercourse was that Hay determined to enter the priesthood, and on the arrival of his vessel at Marseille, Hay journeyed to Rome. There, in 1751, he enrolled in the Scots College, where he studied for nearly eight years. Among his fellow-students was the future Cardinal Erskine.

On 2 April 1758, Hay was ordained a priest by Cardinal Giuseppe Spinelli, and on his return to Scotland was appointed to assist Bishop James Grant in the district of the Enzie, in Banffshire. In 1766, Bishop Grant succeeded Bishop Alexander Smith as the Vicar Apostolic of the Lowland District, and soon afterwards procured the appointment of Hay as his coadjutor. Hays was consecrated on Trinity Sunday, 21 May 1769 to the titular see of Daulia.

=== Vicar Apostolic ===
Hay succeeded Grant in 1778 as Vicar Apostolic, and nominated his friend John Geddes as his coadjutor. Hay ran the diocese strictly, antagonizing many of his subordinates. Among these was Alexander Geddes, whose Bible translation Hay rejected as latitudinarian.

Hay was highly politically active in his position, befriending politicians including Edmund Burke. He violated the penal laws by distributing 10,000 catechisms and, during the Highland Clearances assisted persecuted Catholics in emigrating to Canada. In February 1779, the chapel and house Hay had recently built in Edinburgh were burned in retaliation for his political activism intended towards achieving Catholic Emancipation and for the Papists Act 1778. The outbreak of the Gordon Riots in England, in 1780, further delayed relief, but Hay was able to negotiate compensation from Parliament and the city of Edinburgh.

Since about 1770, Hay had been distancing himself from his youthful Jacobite allegiances, and in the annual clergy meeting of 1779 he proposed and passed a bill recognizing the sovereignty of George III. On the other hand, a 1772 letter from Hay to Charles Edward Stuart privately expressed his support for the Jacobite cause, leaving his actual sympathies unclear.

Hay made efforts to place the college at Rome under the control of Scottish superiors. His efforts on behalf of the institute in Paris were interrupted by the French Revolution, in which it was swept away. Hay's last public work was the foundation of a new seminary at Aquhorthies College, in Aberdeenshire, and here, after transferring, with the sanction of Pius VII, the government of the Lowland District to his coadjutor, Bishop Cameron, he died at the age of eighty-two.

== Works ==
George Hay published the first English Catholic Bible printed in Scotland; but the work which secured his own reputation as a religious writer was his cycle of Catholic doctrine entitled The Sincere Christian, The Devout Christian, and The Pious Christian, published 1781–86.

Catholic Church titles
Preceded by James Grant	Vicar Apostolic of the Lowland District; 1778–1805	Succeeded by Alexander Cameron
