= John Wallace (bishop) =

Roman Catholic bishop (1654–1733)

Styles of John Wallace
- Reference style: The Right Reverend
- Spoken style: My Lord or Bishop

John Wallace (8 April 1654 – 11 July 1733) was a Roman Catholic bishop who served as the Coadjutor Vicar Apostolic of the Vicariate Apostolic of Scotland and then of Lowland District, Scotland.

== Life ==
Born in Arbroath, Forfarshire in 1654 and converted to the Catholic Church in 1690, he was ordained a priest on 3 April 1708. He was appointed the Coadjutor Vicariate Apostolic of Scotland and Titular Bishop of Cyrrhus by the Holy See on 30 April 1720. He was consecrated to the Episcopate on 21 September 1720. The principal consecrator was Bishop James Gordon. When on 23 July 1727 the Vicariate Apostolic of Scotland was split in two Vicariates Apostolic, Bishop Wallace continued to serve as the Coadjutor Viacar Apostolic of the Lowland District until his death on 11 July 1733.

== See also ==
- Catholic Church in Scotland
