= Aquahorthies College =

Catholic seminary in Aberdeenshire, Scotland

Coordinates: 57.269881°N 2.451384°W

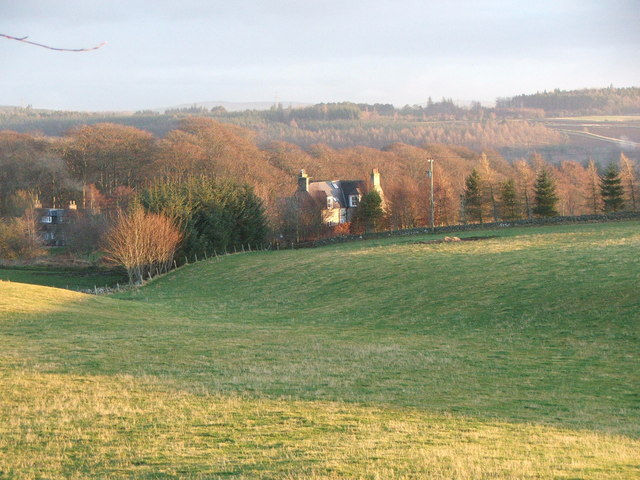
Photograph of Aquahorthies College or the House of Aquahorthies which was a Catholic seminary from 1799 to 1829. It is now a private residence.

Aquahorthies College or the House of Aquahorthies (alternatively spelt Aquhorthies or Aquhorties); was a Catholic seminary in Scotland from 1799 to 1829. At the time it was the only Catholic seminary in the east of Scotland. The house still stands today, located between Blairdaff and Inverurie in Aberdeenshire, as a private residence. It is a Category A listed building and is very close to the Easter Aquhorthies stone circle.

== History ==
Originally, priests for the east part of Scotland, or the Vicariate Apostolic of the Lowland District were trained at Scalan college from 1717 to 1799. The house was very small and could accommodate just over six students, with one priest in charge. As numbers rose, a larger and less remote site was sought.

The house was originally owned by the Leslies of Balquhain, who also owned Balquhain Castle. In the early 17th century, the land was leased by John Seton, the chamberlain to Earl of Dunfermline at Fyvie Castle.

In 1799, Bishop George Hay moved the college from Scalan to Aquhorthies. In fact, he died at the college on 15 October 1811. The college continued until 1829, when it was merged with the Catholic seminary in Lismore, and they were both closed and the students were transferred to the larger Blairs College which continued as a seminary until 1986. The records of Aquhorthies were transferred to the University of Aberdeen in 1956.

== See also ==
- Catholicism in Scotland
- List of Category A listed buildings in Aberdeenshire
