= Snow Kirk =

Scottish church and graveyard

Coordinates: 57°09′46″N 2°06′09″W

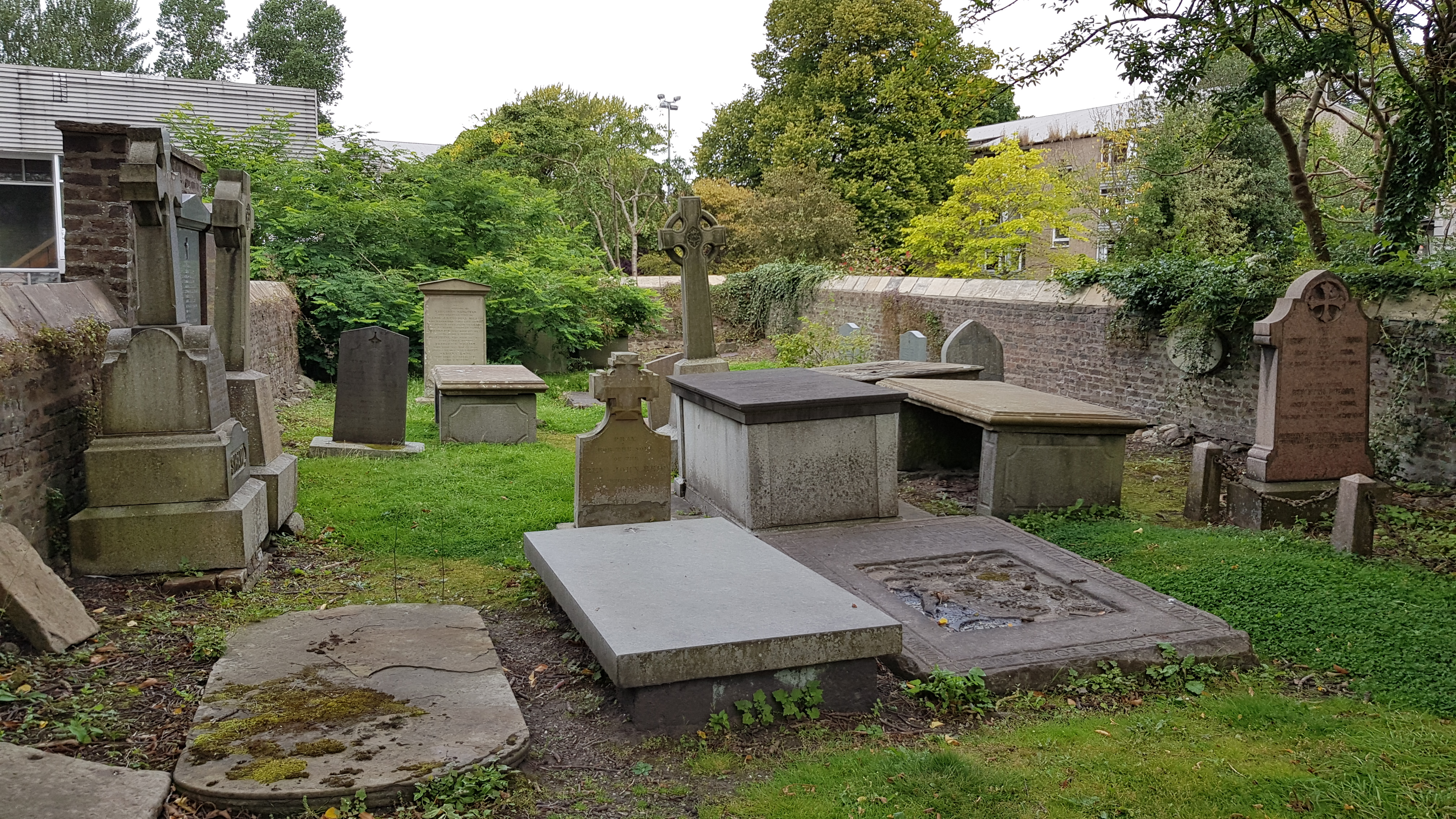
Snow Kirk, Aberdeen

The Snow Kirk (or Snow Church) in Old Aberdeen was a small but important church in Scottish history. It is now ruinous but its site remains as a small graveyard within the bounds of Aberdeen University.

== History ==
This tiny church was named after Santa Maria Maggiore de Nives (St Mary of the Snows) in Rome and was under the control of a local Carmelite friary. Modern folklore attributes the name to various snow-events in Aberdeen. It is thought to have been founded (or at least named) by Bishop Elphinstone which would place it in the mid 15th century. The church was funded by King James IV of Scotland. From 1495 it served a second role as chapel to King's College, Aberdeen and its Rector had a primary role as University Grammarian.

Originally a parish church, it was merged in 1499 with St Machar's Cathedral and lost its parochial status. At the point of the Reformation in Scotland of 1560–1561, it still stood but had minimal function, only holding around 30 persons at most. It was "re-closed" around 1580 due to continuing unauthorised use, but when illustrated in 1688 it was still substantial (though ruinous). From around 1700 it was demolished down to a two-metre (6 ft 7 in) wall soon after the Reformation but remained in use for burials.

In the 18th century, it was misleadingly titled the Papist Burial Ground, which confuses the idea that all burials pre-Reformation were "papist" and that some continuing Catholic burials took place thereafter. Whilst Catholic sympathies survived in the Scottish aristocracy, Catholicism was illegal until the start of the 19th century. Evidence of Catholic affiliation is limited to two bishops (this grave is very prominent) but the majority of burials are clearly Protestant.

The use as a burial ground was terminated in 1934 by the Medical Officer of Health but may still be used for interment of ashes. Only the burial zone within the former church walls survive but the burials originally extended beyond the walls, especially to the south side.

== Notable interments ==
- Bishop John Geddes
- Bishop James Grant
- Morley Hutchinson (memorial only)
- Gilbert Menzies, Lord Provost of Aberdeen
- Prof William Witte (memorial only)
