= Alexander Cameron (bishop) =

Scottish bishop (1747–1828)

The Right Reverend Alexander Cameron
- Vicar Apostolic of the Lowland District
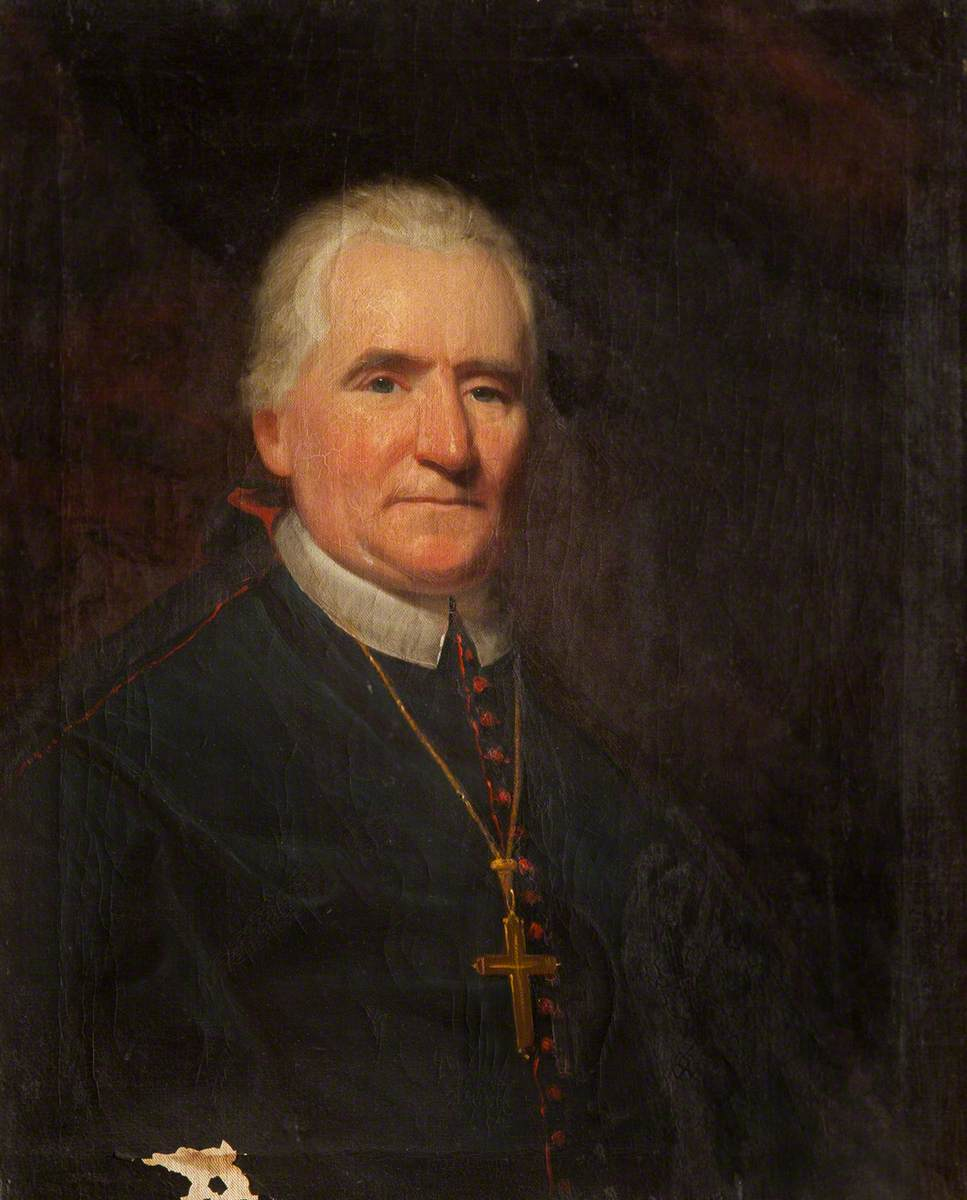
- Church: Roman Catholic
- In office: 1805–1825
- Predecessor: George Hay
- Successor: Alexander Paterson
- Other post: Titular Bishop of Maximianopolis in Palaestina (1797–1828)
- Previous posts: Coadjutor Vicar Apostolic of the Lowland District (1797–1805); Rector of the Royal Scots College, Valladolid (1780–1798)

Orders
- Ordination: 2 February 1772 by Francesco Maria Piccolomini
- Consecration: 28 October 1798 by Antonio Tavira Almazán

Personal details
- Born: 28 July 1747 O.S. Auchindryne, Braemar, Scotland
- Died: 7 February 1828 (aged 80) Edinburgh, Scotland
- Buried: St Mary's Cathedral, Edinburgh
- Education: Pontifical Scots College; Seminary of Scalan

Alexander Cameron (28 July 1747 – 7 February 1828) was a Scottish Catholic prelate who served as the Vicar Apostolic of the Lowland District, Scotland.

== Life ==
Born in Braemar, Aberdeenshire on 28 July 1747, he was the son of James Cameron and Margery Macktinosh. He spent four years at Scalan before entering the Scots College in Rome on 22 December 1764, and took the oath there on 1 June 1765. Seven years later, he received Holy Orders as a subdeacon on 19 January 1772, a deacon on 26 January 1772, and a priest on 2 February 1772, all from Francesco Maria Piccolomini, Bishop of Pienza, in the chapel of the Scots College. He returned to Scotland and was placed in charge of the mission at Strathavon in Banffshire. The young Cameron was then appointed Rector of the Royal Scots College, Valladolid and travelled to Spain in the summer of 1780.

He was appointed the Coadjutor Vicar Apostolic of the Lowland District and Titular Bishop of Maximianopolis in Palaestina by the Holy See on 19 September 1797. He was consecrated to the Episcopate in Madrid by Antonio Tavira Almazán, Bishop of Salamanca on 28 October 1798. Following the retirement of Bishop George Hay on 24 August 1805, he automatically succeeded as the Vicar Apostolic of Lowland District.

In the early 19th century he is listed as living at 6 James Place in Edinburgh.

Twenty years later, he retired on 20 August 1825, and died on 7 February 1828, aged 80.

Catholic Church titles
Preceded by George Hay	Vicar Apostolic of the Lowland District; 1805–1825	Succeeded by Alexander Paterson
