= John Geddes (bishop) =

Scottish Catholic bishop

The Right Reverend John Geddes
- Coadjutor Vicar Apostolic Emeritus of the Lowland District
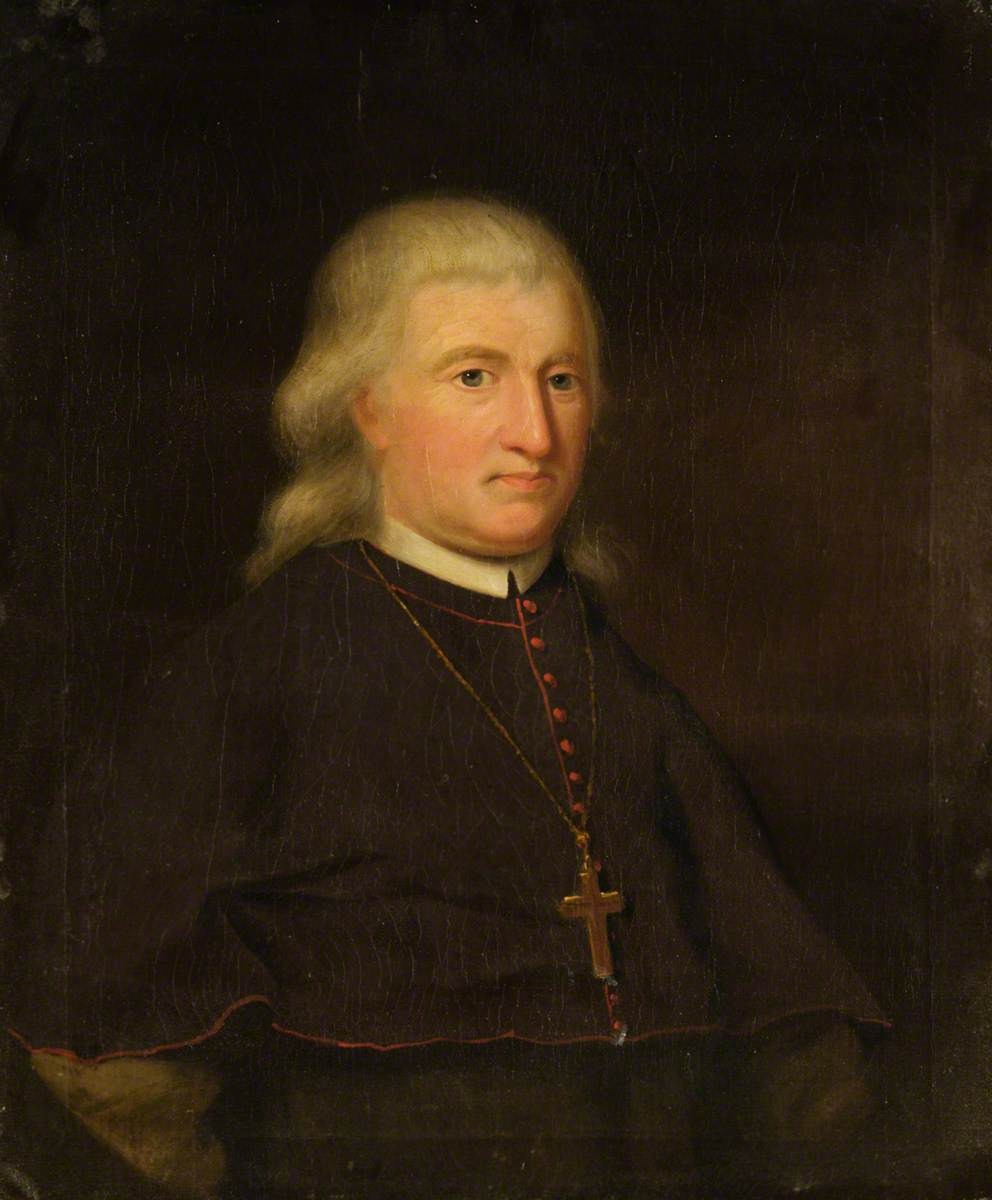
- Church: Catholic
- Appointed: 30 September 1779
- Term ended: 26 October 1797
- Other post: Titular Bishop of Morocco o Marruecos
- Previous posts: Rector of the Royal Scots College (1770–1780); Master of the Seminary of Scalan (1762–1767; 1793)

Orders
- Ordination: 18 March 1759 by Giuseppe Spinelli
- Consecration: 30 November 1780 by Francisco Antonio de Lorenzana

Personal details
- Born: 9 September 1735 Mains of Corridoun, Enzie, Banffshire, Scotland
- Died: 11 February 1799 (aged 63) Aberdeen, Scotland
- Buried: Snow Kirk, Aberdeen
- Education: Pontifical Scots College
- Motto: Ambula coram Deo et esto perfectus
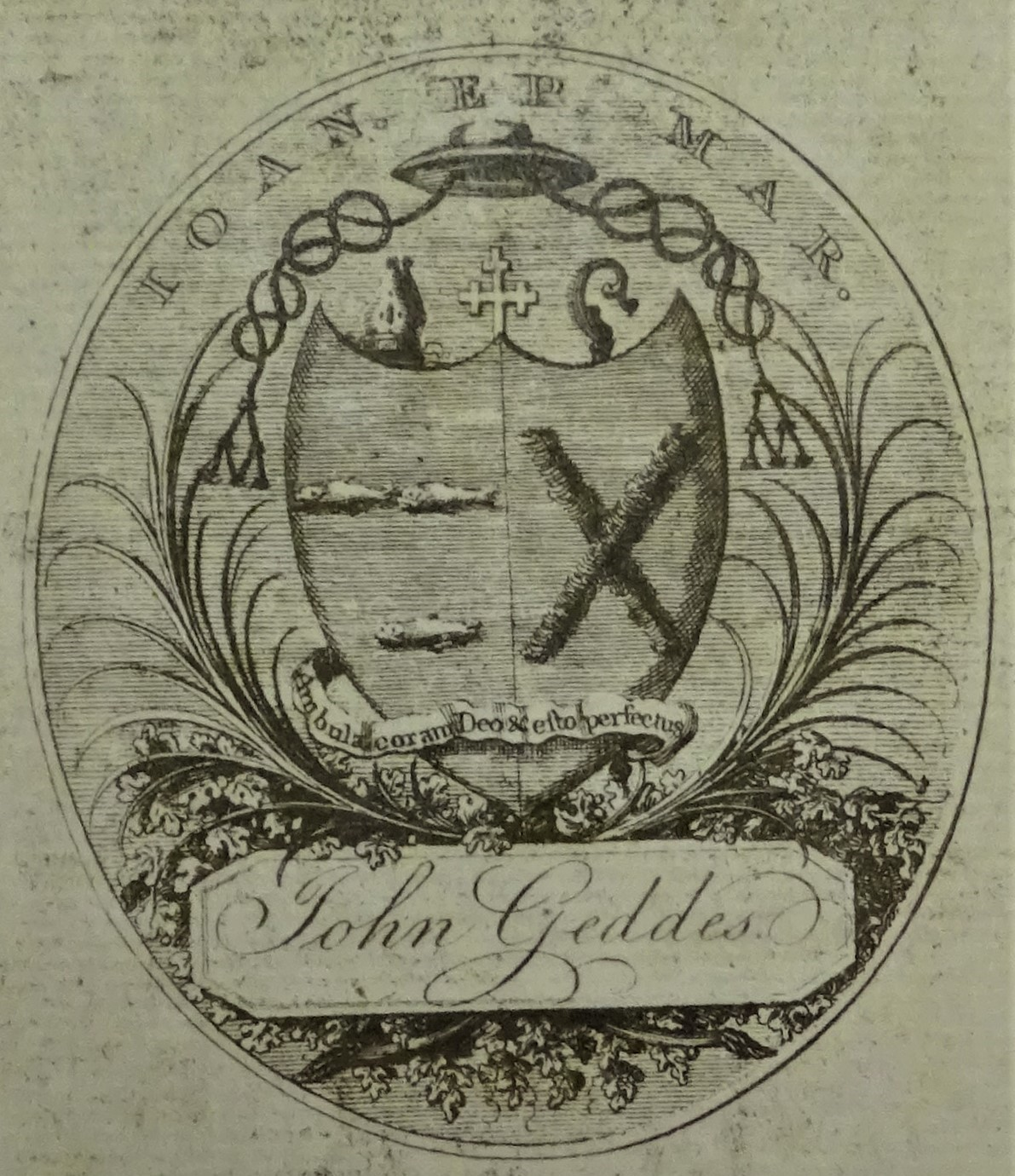
- Coat of arms

John Geddes (9 September 1735 – 11 February 1799) was a Scottish Catholic prelate who served as coadjutor Vicar Apostolic of the Lowland District from 1779 to 1797. He was also rector of the Royal Scots College, Valladolid, from 1771 to 1780. In addition to his published writings about the history of the Catholic Church in Scotland and efforts to achieve Catholic emancipation, Geddes is particularly important for his partially extant diary of Edinburgh intellectual life during the Scottish Enlightenment and for his friendship with Scottish national poet Robert Burns, from whom he received the now priceless volume known as The Geddes Burns.

== Early life ==
Born at Mains of Corridoun, Enzie, Banffshire on 9 September 1735, he entered the Scots College, Rome on 6 February 1750, and took the oath on 31 July 1750. He received the tonsure on 27 March 1754 and the four minor orders from Cardinal Giuseppe Spinelli on 31 March 1754. He was ordained a subdeacon on 4 March 1759, a deacon on 10 March 1759, and a priest by Spinelli on 18 March 1759. He left Rome for a mission in Scotland on 19 April 1759, and served as rector of the underground minor seminary at Scalan in Glenlivet from 1762 to 1767.

Following the 1769 Suppression of the Jesuits, which was motivated by both Caesaropapism and certain other anti-religious currents behind the Bourbon Reforms and the Enlightenment in Spain, Geddes engaged in secret and delicate negotiations at the Spanish court with Don Pedro Rodriguez de Campomanes. Geddes sought permission for the reopening and revival of the former Royal Scots College at Madrid, which had been confiscated from the Society of Jesus and closed down since 1734, as a major seminary for training Scottish secular clergy.

In 1771, Geddes and fifteen seminarians, including seven native speakers of the Scottish Gaelic language from Lochaber and South Uist, revived the college on the outskirts of Valladolid, in Northern Spain. The future bishop later became the college's first post-1734 rector and has since been credited with being solely responsible for the Royal Scots College's continued survival.

In response to the rioting and arson that filled many Scottish cities as an outraged response to the relaxation of the laws criminalising Catholicism by the Catholic Relief Act 1778, Geddes in 1781 wrote from Valladolid, saying that the violence had made Scotland appear, "the most barbarous country in Europe". Geddes also forwarded to Scotland a letter from Campomanes, praising George Hay, the Vicar Apostolic of the Lowland District, for his humane actions, even during the arson that burned down his chapel and residence in Edinburgh.

== Bishop ==
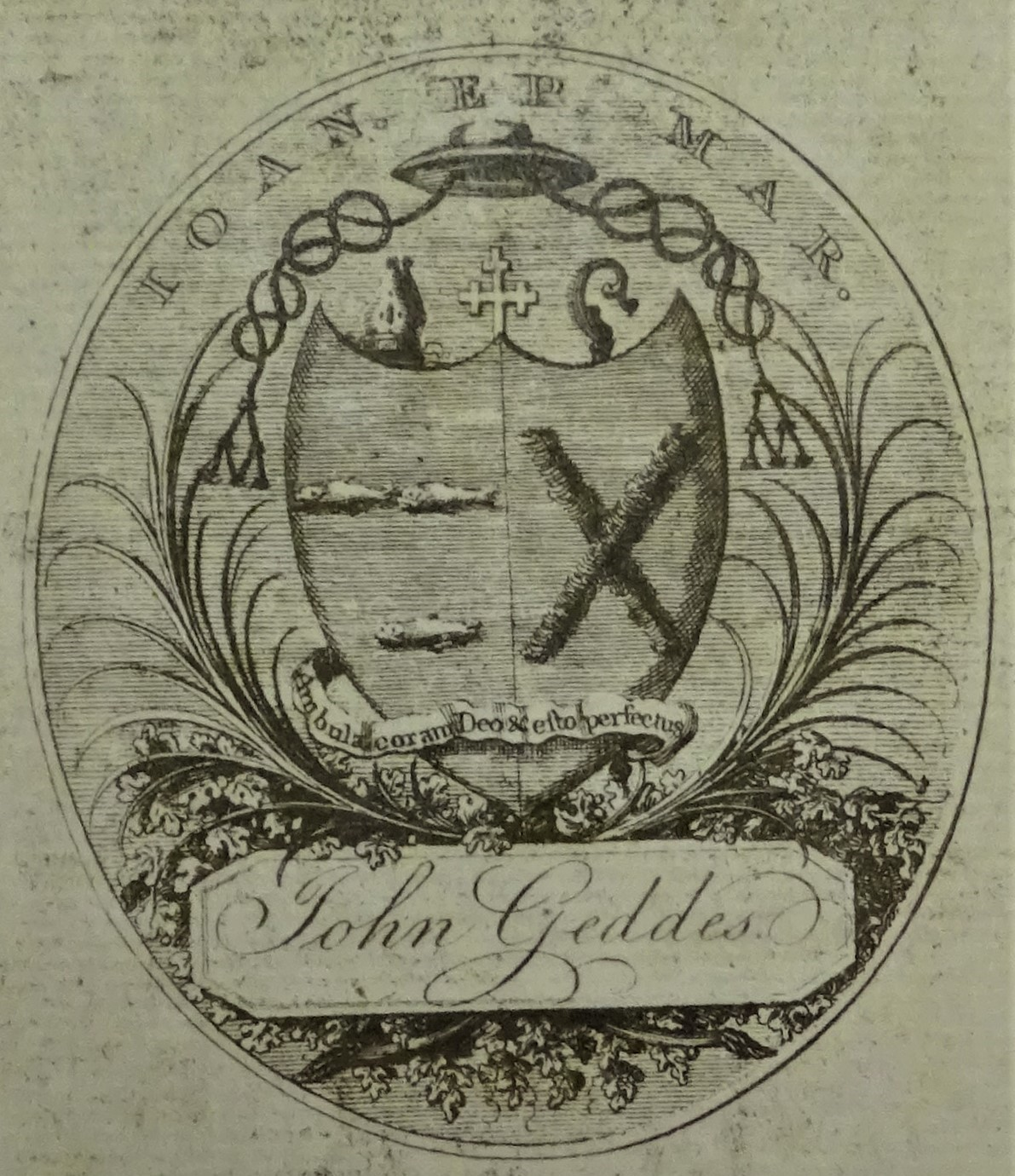
Bishop John Geddes' bookplate and coat of arms from The Geddes Burns.

He was elected the coadjutor and assistant to Bishop Hay by the Sacred Congregation for the Propagation of the Faith on 13 September 1779, which was approved by Pope Pius VI on 19 September 1779, and expedited on 29 September 1779. His papal brief to the titular see of Marocco o Marruecos was dated 30 September 1779 and was consecrated at Madrid on 30 November 1779 (St. Andrew's Day) by Francisco Antonio de Lorenzana y Butrón, Archbishop of Toledo, assisted by Francisco Mateo Aguiriano Gómez and Felipe Pérez Santa María, auxiliary bishops of Toledo.

Following his consecration, Geddes returned to Scotland, where he assisted Hay. Although they had been friends at the Scots College in Rome, Hay and Geddes had very different personalities and their opinions on certain matters were sometimes at variance. Hay viewed the Highland Clearances as a positive development as they moved the Gaelic-speaking laity to the Scottish Lowlands, a position with which Geddes strongly disagreed.

Geddes had a reputation for gentleness and was credited by the district's priests with softening Hay's otherwise autocratic tendencies. It was later written by one such priest, "Men revered the bishop, but they loved the coadjutor."

Geddes became a very well-known figure in Edinburgh, where he was left in charge of the mission after Hay was reassigned to Scalan in Glenlivet. In the process, Geddes befriended many of the most prominent statesmen and intellectuals of the Scottish Enlightenment, including Edmund Burke, Joseph Black, William Creech, Henry Mackenzie, John Home, and many influential members of the Scottish nobility in his quest to both defend his persecuted flock and achieve the repeal of the Popery Act 1698 and the other remaining anti-Catholic penal laws.

Scottish national poet Robert Burns befriended Geddes during the winter of 1786–1787, after they were introduced at the Edinburgh home of Lord Monboddo. According to surviving documents, Geddes thought Burns, "A Man of Uncommon Genius", while Burns always began his letters to Geddes with the words, "Venerable Father." The poet even gave the bishop the personalized first edition of Poems, Chiefly in the Scottish Dialect now known as The Geddes Burns. In a subtle allusion to his poems Holy Willie's Prayer, Address to the Devil, and other similar ones, Burns wrote to another correspondent, "I have outraged that gloomy, fiery Presbyterianism enough already, though I don't spit in her lugubrious face by telling her that the first [that is, finest] cleric character I ever saw was a Roman Catholick – a Popish bishop, Geddes."

According to historian Mark Goldie, it is documented by Geddes' still extant diary for the year 1790 that he reported "his sociable doings to Hay", who, "was somewhat disapproving of so much fraternizing with heretics. Geddes justified himself by stressing it would 'secure us from future storms'."

In December 1790, Geddes wrote to Hay, who felt an intense hatred for the anti-religious laws of the French First Republic, that Burke's Reflections of the Revolution in France was selling very well in Edinburgh and predicted the same book, "will do much good in the present crisis". In April 1791, after reading the same book for himself, Geddes wrote to Hay that he thought Burke's writing, "too declamatory", but in substance, "very just."

== Death and legacy ==
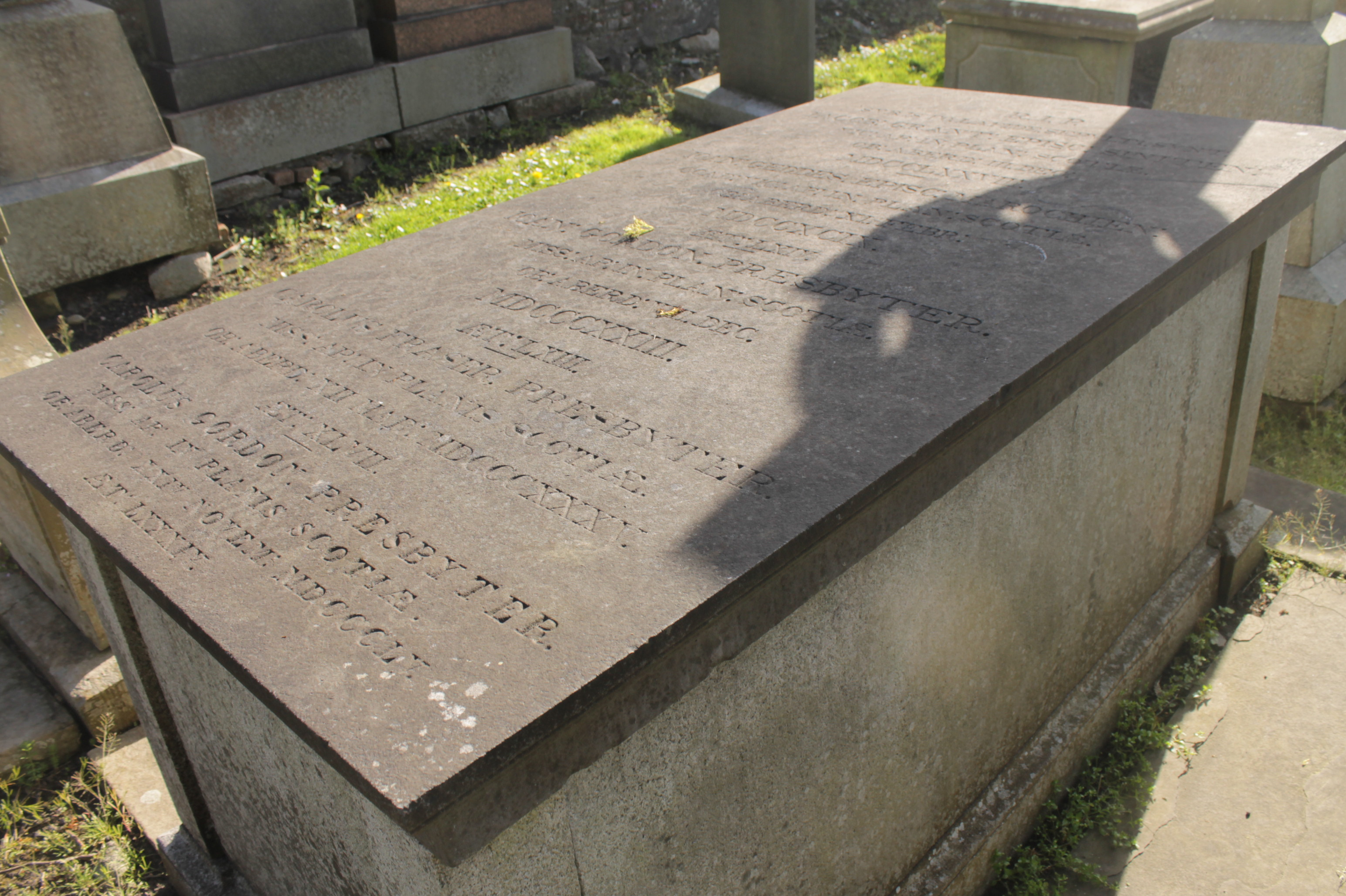
The grave of Bishop Grant and Bishop John Geddes, Snow Kirk.

Although he lived to see his efforts bear fruit in the Roman Catholic Relief Act 1791 and the Roman Catholic Relief Act 1793, declining in health and unable to offer the Mass, Geddes resigned the coadjutorship of the Lowland District on 26 October 1797. He died at Aberdeen on 11 February 1799, aged 63, and lies buried in the same grave with Bishop James Grant in the ruins of the Snow Kirk in Old Aberdeen.

John Geddes' original volume, now known as The Geddes Burns, complete with a letter in the poets own hand and other handwritten work of Robert Burns, now resides at the Henry E. Huntington Library, Art Museum, and Botanical Gardens in San Marino, California.

== Writings ==
- An Apology for the Catholics of Scotland
- Reflections on Duelling, and on the Most Effectual Means of Preventing It, (published by William Creech, 1790)
- An Account of the Province of Biscay in Spain, (written c. 1781, published by the Society of Antiquaries of Scotland, 1792)
- The Life of Saint Margaret, Queen of Scotland with Some Account of Her Husband, Malcom III surnamed Kean More, and of Their Children (1794)
- Some Account of the Catholic Religion in Scotland during the Years 1745–1747, with continuation until 1793 by John Thompson and Abbé Macpherson, (posthumously published based on the original manuscript in the Archbishop's House, Edinburgh, 1909)
