= Alexander Dunbar Winchester =

17th century priest

- Prefect of Scotland
- Church: Catholic Church
- See: Apostolic Prefecture of Scotland
- In office: 12 June 1662 – 1668; 1672 – July 1693
- Predecessor: William Ballantine
- Successor: Thomas Nicolson

Orders
- Ordination: 21 May 1656

Personal details
- Born: 1625 Garmouth, Kingdom of Scotland
- Died: 14 January 1708 (aged 82–83) Banff, Banffshire, Kingdom of Great Britain

Alexander Dunbar Winchester (also known as Alexander Winster; c. 1625 – 14 January 1708) was a Roman Catholic clergyman who served as the Prefect of Scotland.

== Life ==
Born in Garmouth, Moray, in 1625, the names of his parents are unknown. He studied at Rheims for four years and then for four further years with the Jesuits at Dijon. He took the oath in the Scots College in Rome on 21 May 1651, and for the next seven years studied philosophy and theology. He was ordained a priest in the Scots College on 21 May 1656.

He was appointed the Prefect of Scotland by the Holy See on 12 June 1662. He resigned in 1668, but was reappointed again in 1672, only to resign again in July 1693. He was named Dean of the Chapel Royal at Holyrood (the ancient church of Holyrood Abbey) in 1687, but fled north to Gordon Castle during the Glorious Revolution of 1688. He died at Banff on 14 January 1708, aged 83.

Catholic Church titles
Preceded by William Ballantine	Prefect of Scotland; 1662–1668 and 1672–1693	Succeeded by Thomas Nicolson as vicar apostolic
