= Alexander Paterson (bishop) =

Scottish bishop (1766–1831)

The Right Reverend Alexander Paterson
- Vicar Apostolic of the Lowland District
- Church: Roman Catholic
- In office: 1827–1831
- Predecessor: Alexander Cameron
- Successor: Andrew Carruthers
- Other post: Titular Bishop of Cybistra (1816–31)
- Previous posts: Vicar Apostolic of the Lowland District (1825–27); Coadjutor Vicar Apostolic of the Lowland District (1816–25)

Orders
- Ordination: c. 1791
- Consecration: 18 August 1816 by Alexander Cameron

Personal details
- Born: March 1766 Pathead, Enzie, Banffshire, Scotland
- Died: 30 October 1831 (aged 65) Dundee, Scotland
- Education: Scots College, Douai

Alexander Paterson (March 1766 – 30 October 1831) was a Roman Catholic bishop who served as the Vicar Apostolic of the Lowland District from 1825 to 1827, then, following a change in the district's name, Vicar Apostolic of the Eastern District from 1827 to 1831.

== Biography ==
Born in Pathhead, near Enzie in Banffshire, Scotland in March 1766, he entered Scalan and then the Scots College Douai and was ordained a priest in about 1791. He remained at Douai as the sub-principal until the closure of the college in 1793. He was stationed in Glenlivet until 1812 when he was sent to Paisley.

He was appointed the Coadjutor Vicar Apostolic of the Lowland District and Titular Bishop of Cybistra by the Holy See on 14 May 1816. He was consecrated to the Episcopate on 18 August 1816. The principal consecrator was Bishop Alexander Cameron, and the principal co-consecrator was Bishop Aeneas Chisholm. He traveled to Paris in late 1821 attempting to recover the property of the Scots Colleges at Paris and Douai.

On the retirement of Bishop Alexander Cameron on 20 August 1825, he automatically succeeded as the Vicar Apostolic of the Lowland District. On 13 February 1827, the Lowland District was renamed the Eastern District, with Bishop Paterson as the vicar apostolic.

He died suddenly on 30 October 1831, aged 65. He had collapsed in the vestry after celebrating Mass and delivering a sermon. Cardinal de Latil of Reims attended the funeral in choir.

== See also ==
- Cybistra

Catholic Church titles
Preceded by Alexander Cameron	Vicar Apostolic of the Lowland District; 1825–1827	Title name changed
New title	Vicar Apostolic of the Eastern District; 1827–1831	Succeeded by Andrew Carruthers
