= William Witte =

German scholar (1907–1992)

William Witte FRSE (18 February 1907 – 22 September 1992) was a 20th-century scholar of the German language and German literature, working in Britain.

In 1959, Wittw postulated that Schiller's "Ode to Joy" was specifically rewritten in 1803 following influence on Schiller by the works of Robert Burns.

== Life ==
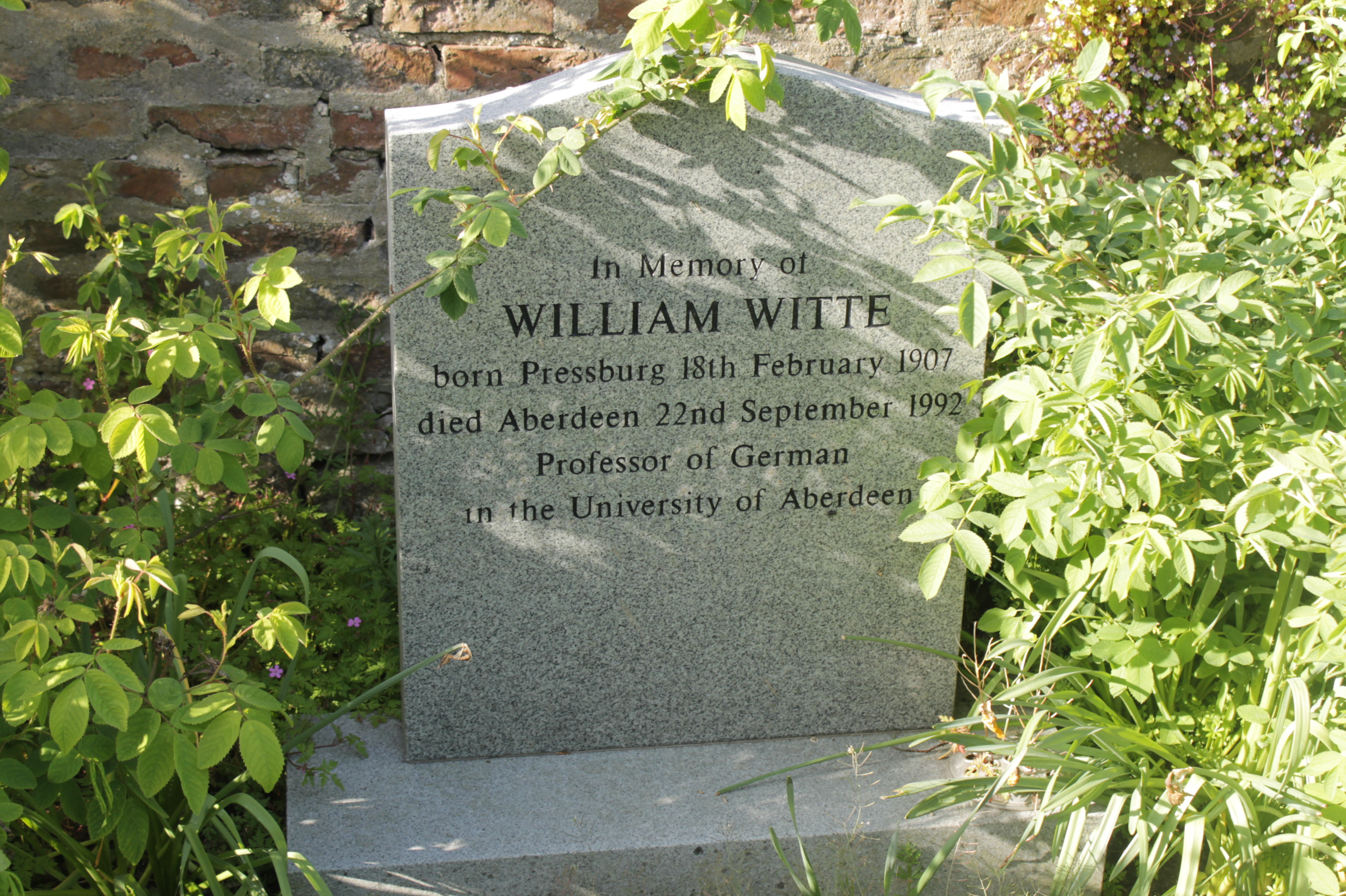
Memorial to William Witte, Snow Kirk, Old Aberdeen

Witte was born in Bratislava in Slovakia (then known as Pressburg) on 18 February 1907, the son of William G. J. Witte. His family travelled widely, and he was educated in Poland and Austria and then attended the Ludwig-Maximilians-Universität München in Germany. After a year at the Friedrich Wilhelm University of Berlin, he ended in the University of Breslau (then in Germany, now Wrocław in Poland) where he gained a doctorate in economics in 1930.

In 1931, he left mainland Europe to go to Aberdeen University in Scotland as an assistant lecturer in German. In 1936, he transferred to Edinburgh University in the same role for one year before returning to Aberdeen, with a PhD from Edinburgh. As a non-German German-speaker he survived the rigours of the Second World War and began to climb in position. He was appointed Professor of German in 1951. Most of his years in Aberdeen, he lived on Don Street close to the university.

The University of London awarded him an honorary doctorate (DLitt) in 1966. In 1978, he was elected a Fellow of the Royal Society of Edinburgh. His proposers were Thomas Malcolm Knox, Fraser Noble, Robert Cross and Anthony Elliot Ritchie.

He died on 22 September 1992. He is memorialised in the Snow Kirk in Old Aberdeen.

== Publications ==
- Modern German Prose Usage (1937)
- Schiller (1949)
- Schiller and Burns (1959)
- German Romance and German Romanticism (1963, republished 1975)
- German Life and Letters (1977)

== Other awards and positions ==
- Gold Medal from the Goethe Institute of Munich in 1971
- Cross of an Officer of Merit (First Class) from the Federal Republic of Germany in 1974
- Queen's Jubilee Medal in 1977
- Chairman of the National Conference of University Teachers of German in Great Britain in Ireland in both 1970 and 1971
- Vice Chairman of the Society of British German Studies from 1982

== Family ==
In 1937 he married Edith Mary Stenhouse Melvin, a linguist, and eldest daughter of the headmaster of Turriff Secondary School.
