= James Carruthers =

Scottish Roman Catholic priest and historian

James Carruthers (1759–1832) was a Scottish Roman Catholic priest and historian.

== Life ==
He was the son of Catholic parents, Andrew Carruthers and his wife Lucy Rigg; Bishop Andrew Carruthers was his brother. He was born in New Abbey in the Stewartry of Kirkcudbright.

Fr. Carruthers was educated in the Scottish College, Douai, and on his return to Scotland was ordained priest and appointed to the charge of Glenlivet. Afterwards he was successively at Buchan, in Aberdeenshire, at Preshome in the Enzie, at Dumfries, and at St Mary's, New Abbey, where he died on 14 February 1832. He was buried in the graveyard of Sweetheart Abbey.

== Works ==
Carruthers wrote:

- The History of Scotland from the earliest period of the Scottish Monarchy to the Accession of the Stewart Family, interspersed with Synoptical Reviews of Politics, Literature, and Religion throughout the World, 2 vols., Edinburgh, 1826.
- The History of Scotland during the reign of Queen Mary until the accession of her son James to the crown of England, Edinburgh, 1831.

== See also ==
- Catholic Church in Scotland

== Notes ==
Attribution

This article incorporates text from a publication now in the public domain: Stephen, Leslie, ed. (1887). "Carruthers, James". Dictionary of National Biography. Vol. 9. London: Smith, Elder & Co.
