= Alexander Smith (bishop, born 1684) =

Roman Catholic bishop in Scotland (c. 1684–1766)

The Right Reverend Alexander Smith
- Vicar Apostolic of the Lowland District
- Church: Roman Catholic Church
- In office: 1746–1766
- Predecessor: James Gordon
- Successor: James Grant
- Other posts: Titular Bishop of Mosynopolis (1735-1766)
- Previous posts: Coadjutor Vicar Apostolic of the Lowland District (1735–1746)

Orders
- Ordination: 19 April 1712 by James Gordon
- Consecration: 13 November 1735 by James Gordon

Personal details
- Born: c. 1684 Fochabers, Scotland
- Died: 21 August 1766 (aged about 82) Edinburgh, Midlothian, Scotland

Alexander Smith (c. 1684 – 21 August 1766) was a Roman Catholic bishop who served as the Vicar Apostolic of the Lowland District, Scotland.

== Life ==
Born in Fochabers, Moray in 1684, he was ordained a priest on 19 April 1712. He was appointed the Coadjutor Vicar Apostolic of the Lowland District and Titular Bishop of Mosynopolis by the Holy See on 19 September 1735. He was consecrated to the Episcopate in Edinburgh on 2 November 1735. The principal consecrator was Bishop James Gordon, and the principal co-consecrator was Bishop Hugh MacDonald. On the death of James Gordon on 18 February 1746, he automatically succeeded as the Vicar Apostolic of the Lowland District. He died in office on 21 August 1766, aged 73.

Catholic Church titles
Preceded by James Gordon	Vicar Apostolic of the Lowland District; 1746–1766	Succeeded by James Grant
