= Alexander Geddes =

Scottish theologian and translator 1737–1802

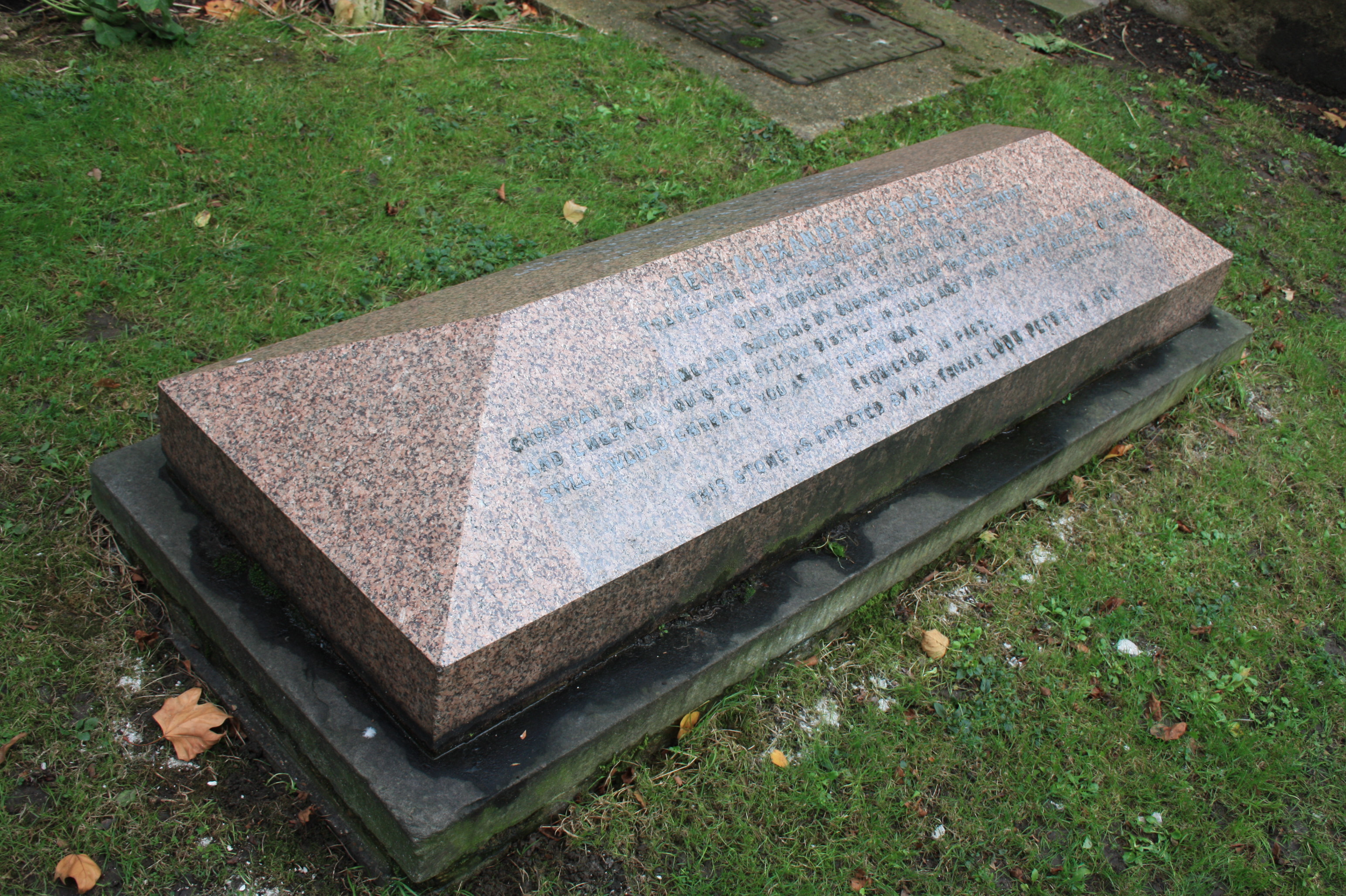
The grave of Rev Alexander Geddes, St Marys Paddington

Alexander Geddes (14 September 1737 – 26 February 1802) was a Scottish Catholic theologian and scholar. He translated a major part of the Old Testament of the Catholic Bible into English.

== Translations and commentaries ==
Geddes was born at Rathven, Banffshire, of Catholic parentage, and educated for the priesthood at the local seminary of Scalan, and at Paris; he became a priest in his native county.

His translation of the Satires of Horace made him known as a scholar, but his liberalism led to his suspension. He then went to London, where he became known to Baron Petre, who enabled him to proceed with a new translation of the Bible for English Catholics, which he carried on as far as the Book of Second Chronicles and the Prayer of Manasseh which was published in 2 volumes (1792–1797). A translation of Psalms was published in 1807. Geddes was also a poet, and wrote Linton: a Tweedside Pastoral, Carmen Seculare pro Gallica Gente (1790), in praise of the French Revolution.

He released his Critical Remarks on the Hebrew Scriptures in 1800, wherein he largely anticipated the German school of higher criticism. The result of this publication was Geddes's suspension from all ecclesiastical functions. Arguing for the mythic character of the Pentateuch, he cast doubt not on those books' veracity but their historicity, seeing in the Fall for example "the mythic account of the painful condition of human life," rather than a historical chronicle.

He died without recanting his works of higher criticism, but received absolution at the hands of a French priest, though public Mass for his soul was forbidden by the ecclesiastical powers. He is buried next to the south-east corner of St. Mary's Church in Paddington, London.

== Publications ==
- The Holy Bible, or the Books accounted sacred by Jews and Christians, otherwise called the books of the Old and New Covenant; faithfully translated from corrected texts of the originals. With various readings, explanatory notes, and critical remarks. By Alexander Geddes. (J. Davis, London. 1797).
- English translations of Homer
