= Archbishop of St Andrews and Edinburgh =

Roman Catholic archiepiscopal position in Scotland

- Archbishopric

catholic
- Incumbent: Leo Cushley

Information
- Diocese: Archdiocese of St Andrews and Edinburgh
- Cathedral: St Mary's Cathedral, Edinburgh

The Archbishop of St Andrews and Edinburgh is the ordinary of the Archdiocese of St Andrews and Edinburgh. The archdiocese covers an area of 5,504 km^{2}. The metropolitan see is in the City of Edinburgh where the archbishop's seat (cathedra) is located at the Cathedral Church of Saint Mary. The eighth and current archbishop is Leo Cushley.

== History ==
After the Scottish Reformation, the Catholic Church abandoned the hierarchy and for nearly a century Catholics in Scotland were under the jurisdiction of the English prefects and vicars apostolic. In 1653, the Prefecture Apostolic of Scotland was established, which was elevated to the Vicariate Apostolic in 1694. On 23 July 1727, Scotland was divided into the Vicariates Apostolic of the Lowland District and the Highland District, each headed by a vicar apostolic. On 13 February 1827, Scotland was divided again into three vicariates apostolic; the Eastern District (formerly the Lowland District), the Northern District (formerly the Highland District), and the Western District (created from parts of the other two districts). On the restoration of the Scottish hierarchy by Pope Leo XIII on 15 March 1878, part of the Eastern District was elevated to the status of a metropolitan archdiocese with the title St Andrews and Edinburgh.

== List of ordinaries ==
Prefects of Scotland
From	Until	Incumbent	Notes
1653	1661	William Ballantine	Ordained to the priesthood on 3 December 1645 and appointed Prefect of Scotland on 13 October 1653; died in office on 2 September 1661.
1662	1693	Alexander Dunbar Winchester	Ordained to the priesthood on 21 May 1656 and appointed Prefect of Scotland on 12 June 1662; resigned in 1668; reappointed in 1672; resigned again in July 1693; died on 14 January 1708; also known as Alexander Winster.
Vicars Apostolic of Scotland
From	Until	Incumbent	Notes
1694	1718	Thomas Joseph Nicolson	Appointed Vicar Apostolic of Scotland and Titular Bishop of Peristasis on 7 September 1694; ordained bishop on 27 February 1695; died in office on 12 October 1718.
1718	1727	James Gordon	Appointed Coadjutor Vicar Apostolic of Scotland and Titular Bishop of Nicopolis ad Iaterum on 21 August 1705; ordained bishop on 11 April 1706; succeeded Vicar Apostolic of Scotland on 12 October 1718; appointed Vicar Apostolic of the Lowland District on 23 July 1727.
Vicar Apostolic of the Lowland District
From	Until	Incumbent	Notes
1727	1746	James Gordon	Hitherto Vicar Apostolic of Scotland; appointed Vicar Apostolic of the Lowland District on 23 July 1727; died in office on 18 February 1746
1746	1767	Alexander Smith	Appointed Coadjutor Vicar Apostolic of the Lowland District and Titular Bishop of Mosynopolis on 19 September 1735; ordained bishop on 2 November 1735; succeeded Vicar Apostolic of the Lowland District on 18 February 1746; died in office on 21 August 1767.
1767	1778	James Grant	Appointed Coadjutor Vicar Apostolic of the Lowland District and Titular Bishop of Sinitis on 21 February 1755; ordained bishop on 13 November 1755; succeeded Vicar Apostolic of the Lowland District on 21 August 1767; died in office on 3 December 1778.
1778	1805	George Hay	Appointed Coadjutor Vicar Apostolic of the Lowland District and Titular Bishop of Daulia on 5 October 1768; ordained bishop on 21 May 1769; succeeded Vicar Apostolic of the Lowland District on 3 December 1778; retired on 24 August 1805; died on 15 October 1811.
1805	1825	Alexander Cameron	Appointed Coadjutor Vicar Apostolic of the Lowland District and Titular Bishop of Maximianopolis in Palaestina on 19 September 1797; ordained bishop on 28 October 1798; succeeded Vicar Apostolic of the Lowland District on 24 August 1805; retired on 20 August 1825; died on 7 February 1828.
1825	1827	Alexander Paterson	Appointed Coadjutor Vicar Apostolic of the Lowland District and Titular Bishop of Cybistra on 14 May 1816; ordained bishop on 18 August 1816; succeeded Vicar Apostolic of the Lowland District on 20 August 1825; became Vicar Apostolic of the Eastern District on 13 February 1827.
Vicars Apostolic of the Eastern District
From	Until	Incumbent	Notes
1827	1831	Alexander Paterson	Hitherto Vicar Apostolic of the Lowland District; appointed Vicar Apostolic of the Eastern District on 13 February 1827; died in office on 30 October 1831
1832	1852	Andrew Carruthers	Appointed Vicar Apostolic of the Eastern District and Titular Bishop of Ceramus on 28 September 1832; ordained bishop on 13 January 1833; died in office on 24 May 1852.
1852	1864	James Gillis	Appointed Coadjutor Vicar Apostolic of the Eastern District and Titular Bishop of Limyra on 28 July 1837; ordained bishop on 22 July 1838; succeeded Vicar Apostolic of the Eastern District on 24 May 1852; died in office on 24 February 1864.
1864	1878	John Menzies Strain	Appointed Vicar Apostolic of the Eastern District and Titular Bishop of Abila Lysaniae on 2 September 1864; ordained bishop on 25 September 1864; appointed Archbishop of St Andrews and Edinburgh on 15 March 1878.
Archbishops of St Andrews and Edinburgh
From	Until	Incumbent	Notes
1878	1883	John Menzies Strain	Hitherto Vicar Apostolic of the Eastern District and Titular Bishop of Abila Lysaniae; enthroned as Archbishop of St Andrews and Edinburgh on 15 March 1878; died in office on 2 July 1883
1885	1892	William Smith	Appointed Archbishop of St Andrews and Edinburgh on 2 October 1885; enthroned on 28 October 1885; died in office on 16 March 1892.
1892	1900	Angus MacDonald	Translated from Argyll and the Isles; appointed Archbishop of St Andrews and Edinburgh on 15 July 1892; died in office on 29 April 1900.
1900	1928	James August Smith	Translated from Dunkeld; appointed Archbishop of St Andrews and Edinburgh on 30 August 1900; died in office on 25 November 1928.
1929	1950	Andrew Thomas McDonald, O.S.B.	Appointed Archbishop of St Andrews and Edinburgh on 19 July 1929; enthroned on 24 September 1929; died in office on 22 May 1950.
1951	1985	(Cardinal) Gordon Joseph Gray	Appointed Archbishop of St Andrews and Edinburgh on 20 June 1951; enthroned on 21 September 1951; created Cardinal-Priest of S. Chiara a Vigna Clara on 28 April 1969; retired on 30 May 1985; died on 19 July 1993.
1985	2013	(Cardinal) Keith Michael Patrick O’Brien	Appointed Archbishop of St Andrews and Edinburgh on 30 May 1985; enthroned on 5 August 1985; also Apostolic Administrator of Argyll and the Isles from June 1996 to October 1999; created Cardinal-Priest of Ss. Gioacchino ed Anna ad Tusculanum on 21 October 2003. Resignation accepted nunc pro tunc 13 November 2012 and definitively accepted by Pope Benedict XVI on 25 February 2013.
2013	present	Leo Cushley	Appointed Archbishop of St Andrews and Edinburgh on 24 July 2013; enthroned on 21 September 2013.

== See also ==
- Archbishop of St Andrews

== Bibliography ==
- Brady, W. Maziere (1876). The Episcopal Succession in England, Scotland and Ireland, A.D. 1400 to 1875. Vol. 3. Rome: Tipografia Della Pace.
- Gordon, J. F. S. (1867). Journal and Appendix to Scotichronicon and Monasticon. Vol. 1. Glasgow: John Tweed.
