= Scalan =

Ruined 18th century Catholic seminary in Moray, Scotland

Coordinates: 57°15′36″N 3°15′05″W

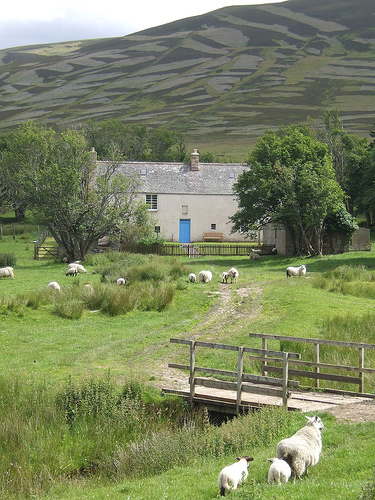
The college at Scalan in July 2007.

The Scalan was a Scottish Catholic seminary and one of the few places in Scotland where the Catholic faith was kept alive during the anti-Catholic persecutions of the 18th century.

== History ==
For much of the 18th century, the college at Scalan in the Braes of Glenlivet was the only place in Scotland where young men were trained to be Catholic priests, the so-called "heather priests". From 1717 to 1799, over a hundred were trained despite numerous attacks by Hanoverian soldiers. Scalan was burned to the ground by them on several occasions but was always rebuilt.

The college played a vital role in keeping the traditional Catholic faith alive in northern Scotland. It was named after the Gaelic word given to turf-roofed sheilings (Scottish Gaelic: sgàlan) found in the Braes during that period. In 1799, the college was moved to a less remote site, Aquhorthies College, which had larger premises and more accommodation.

Alexander Geddes, Scottish theologian and scholar, and his brother, Bishop John Geddes, was among the famous figures who studied or taught at the college. George James Gordon, known as the "heather priest" was educated and then taught here as a non-Jesuit for many years.

The last permanent resident of the Scalan was Sandy Matheson, who died in late 2005.

== Today ==
The college is largely invisible until one is very close, a factor invaluable in evading detection by the Hanoverian soldiers.

The Scalan is now a museum and is open all year for visitors.

The Scalan Association seeks to promote the preservation of the college of Scalan and its history.

== Masters ==
- George Innes 1716 (?); 1718–22
- Alexander Smith, 1716–18
- J. Alexander Grant, 1722–24; 1725–26
- John Tyrie, 1724–25
- George Innes, 1726–27
- George J. Gordon, 1727–38
- Alexander Gordon 1738–41
- William Duthie, 1741–58
- George Duncan, 1758–59
- William Gray, 1759–62
- John Geddes, 1762–67; 1793
- John Thomson, 1767–70
- John Paterson, 1770–83
- John Farquharson, 1783–84
- Alexander Farquharson, 1784–87
- Andrew Dason, 1787–88
- George Hay, 1788–93
  - John Ingram, 1791–92 (acting)
  - Andrew Carruthers, 1793 (acting)
- James Sharp, 1793–99

== Gallery ==
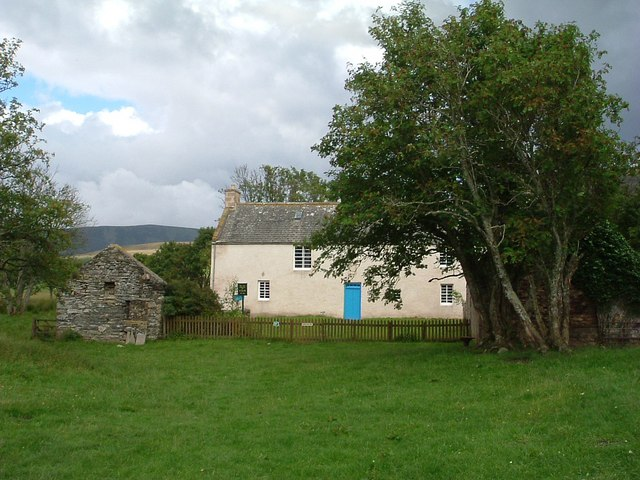
Buildings

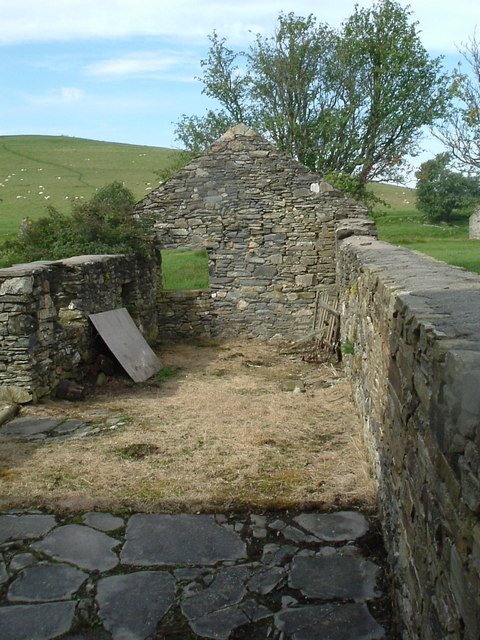
Outbuilding

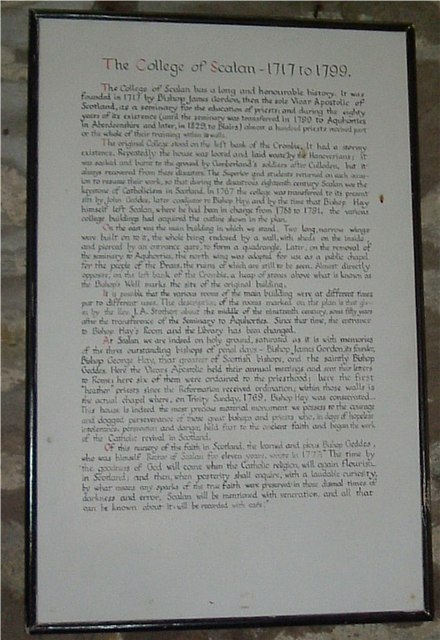
History displayed in vicinity
