= Jules Mascaron =

French preacher (1634–1703)

Jules Mascaron C.O.I.
- Bishop of Agen
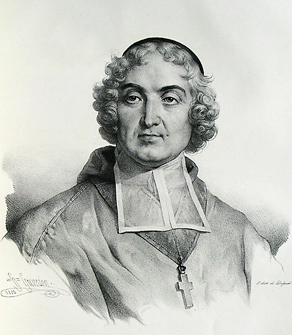
- Church: Catholic Church
- Diocese: Diocese of Agen
- In office: 8 January 1680 – 16 November 1703
- Predecessor: Claude Joli
- Successor: François Hébert

Orders
- Ordination: 15 June 1658
- Consecration: 8 May 1672 by François de Harlay de Champvallon

Personal details
- Born: 14 March 1634 Marseille, Provence, Kingdom of France
- Died: 16 November 1703 (aged 69)

Jules Mascaron (1634–1703) was a popular French preacher. He was born in Marseille as the son of a barrister at Aix-en-Provence. He entered the Oratory of Jesus early and became reputed as a preacher. Paris confirmed the judgment of the provinces; in 1666 he was asked to preach before the court and became a favourite of Louis XIV, who said that his eloquence was one of the few things that never grew old.

In 1671, he was appointed the bishop of Tulle; eight years later he was transferred to the larger diocese of Agen. He still continued to preach regularly at court, especially for funeral orations. A panegyric on Turenne, delivered in 1675, is considered to be his masterpiece. His style is strongly tinged with préciosité and his chief surviving interest is as a glaring example of the evils from which Jacques-Bénigne Bossuet delivered the French pulpit.

During his later years, he devoted himself entirely to his pastoral duties at Agen where he died in 1703.

Six of his most famous sermons were edited, with a biographical sketch of their author, by the Oratorian Borde in 1704. One his most famous books, which went into several editions, was La Mort et les Dernieres Paroles de Seneque Lyon, 1653. A critical quote concerning Girolamo Cardano's book praising Nero can be found in Nero: An Exemplary Life by Inkstone, 2012.
