= Restoration of the Scottish Catholic hierarchy =

1878 act by Pope Leo XIII

The re-establishment of the hierarchy of the Catholic Church in Scotland took effect on 15 March 1878. This followed the restoration of the English hierarchy in 1850.

The restoration was carried out on the instructions of Pope Leo XIII and was one of the first acts of his papacy.

The "old" hierarchy had ended in 1603 when Archbishop Beaton of the Archdiocese of Glasgow died in Paris. In the intervening period from the Scottish Reformation until the restoration of the hierarchy, Scottish Catholics were ministered to by an underground network of priests (such as Saint John Ogilvie, Martyr) who were governed by Prefects Apostolic and then Vicars Apostolic as the oppression of Catholics became less severe.

The bishops of the restored hierarchy were drawn from the then existing Vicars Apostolic and the territories of the new dioceses and archdioceses were based on the ancient (pre-reformation) ones.

There were two archbishops and four bishops in the new hierarchy:

- Archbishop of Saint Andrews and Edinburgh
  - Bishop of Aberdeen
  - Bishop of Argyll and the Isles
  - Bishop of Dunkeld
  - Bishop of Galloway
- Archbishop of Glasgow

The Archdiocese of St Andrews and Edinburgh was to be the Metropolitan See for Scotland with the Archdiocese of Glasgow to be under control of the Holy See.

It was nearly another 100 years before Scotland had its first post-Reformation cardinal appointed. In 1969 Archbishop Gray of St Andrews and Edinburgh was elevated to the rank of Cardinal, as were in the years following Cardinal Winning of Glasgow, and Cardinal O'Brien of St Andrews and Edinburgh.

== See also ==
- Catholic Church in Scotland
- Vicariate Apostolic of Scotland
