= Archdiocese of St Andrews and Edinburgh =

Latin Catholic archdiocese in Scotland

Archdiocese of St Andrews and Edinburgh Archidioecesis Sancti Andreae et Edimburgensis

Catholic
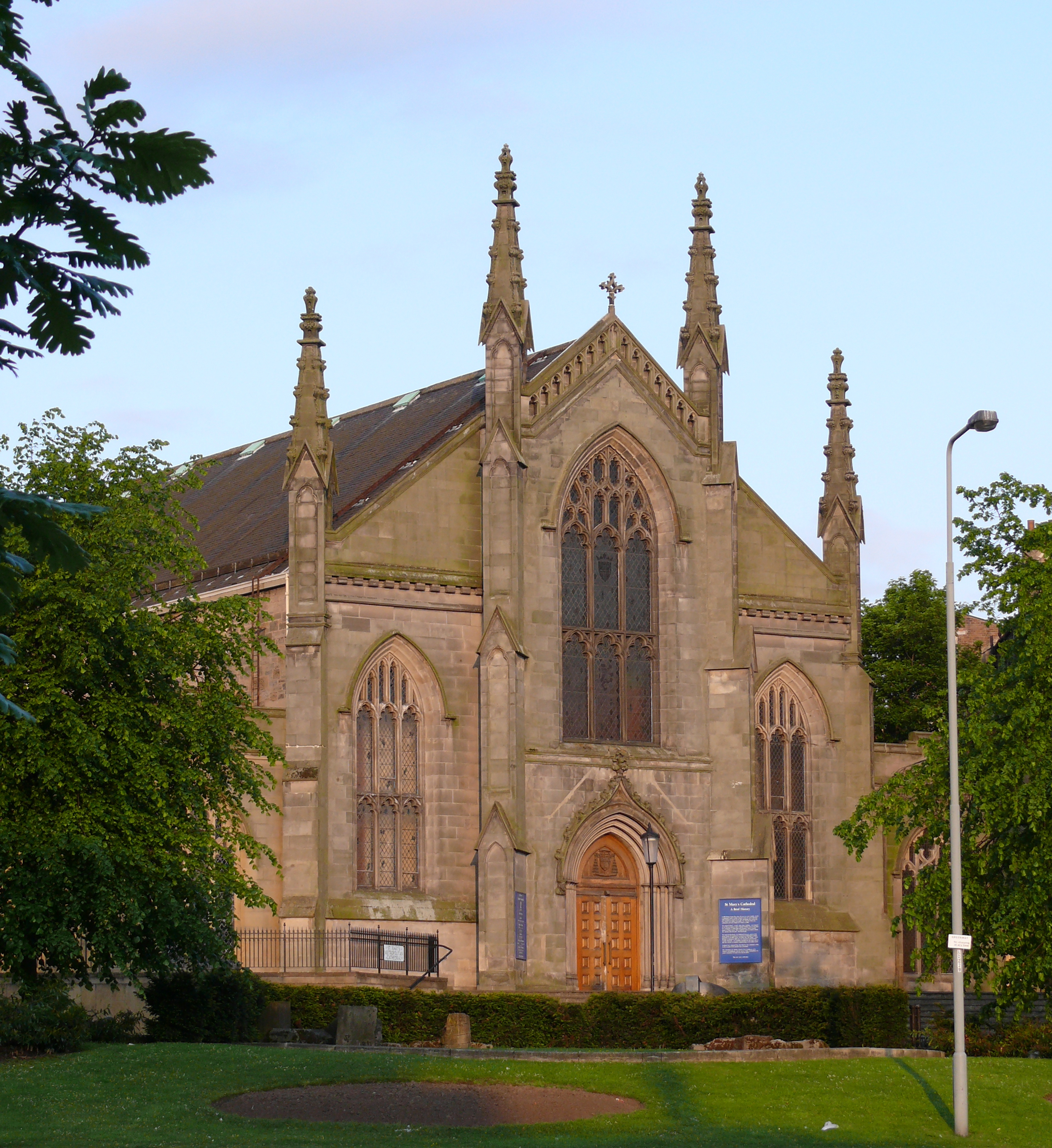
- St Mary's Metropolitan Cathedral, Edinburgh

- Coat of arms

Location
- Country: Scotland
- Territory: City of Edinburgh and the council areas of Clackmannanshire, part of Fife, Falkirk, West, Mid and East Lothian, and the Scottish Borders
- Ecclesiastical province: St Andrews and Edinburgh
- Coordinates: 56.189°N 3.631°W

Statistics
- Area: 5,504 km^{2} (2,125 sq mi)
- Population: Total; Catholics: (as of 2020); 1,595,000; 122,280 (7.7%)
- Parishes: 109

Information
- Denomination: Catholic
- Sui iuris church: Latin Church
- Rite: Roman Rite
- Established: 4 March 1878
- Cathedral: St Mary's Metropolitan Cathedral, Edinburgh
- Secular priests: 76

Current leadership
- Pope: Leo XIV
- Archbishop: Leo Cushley
- Vicar General: Patrick Burke; Allan Chambers

Map
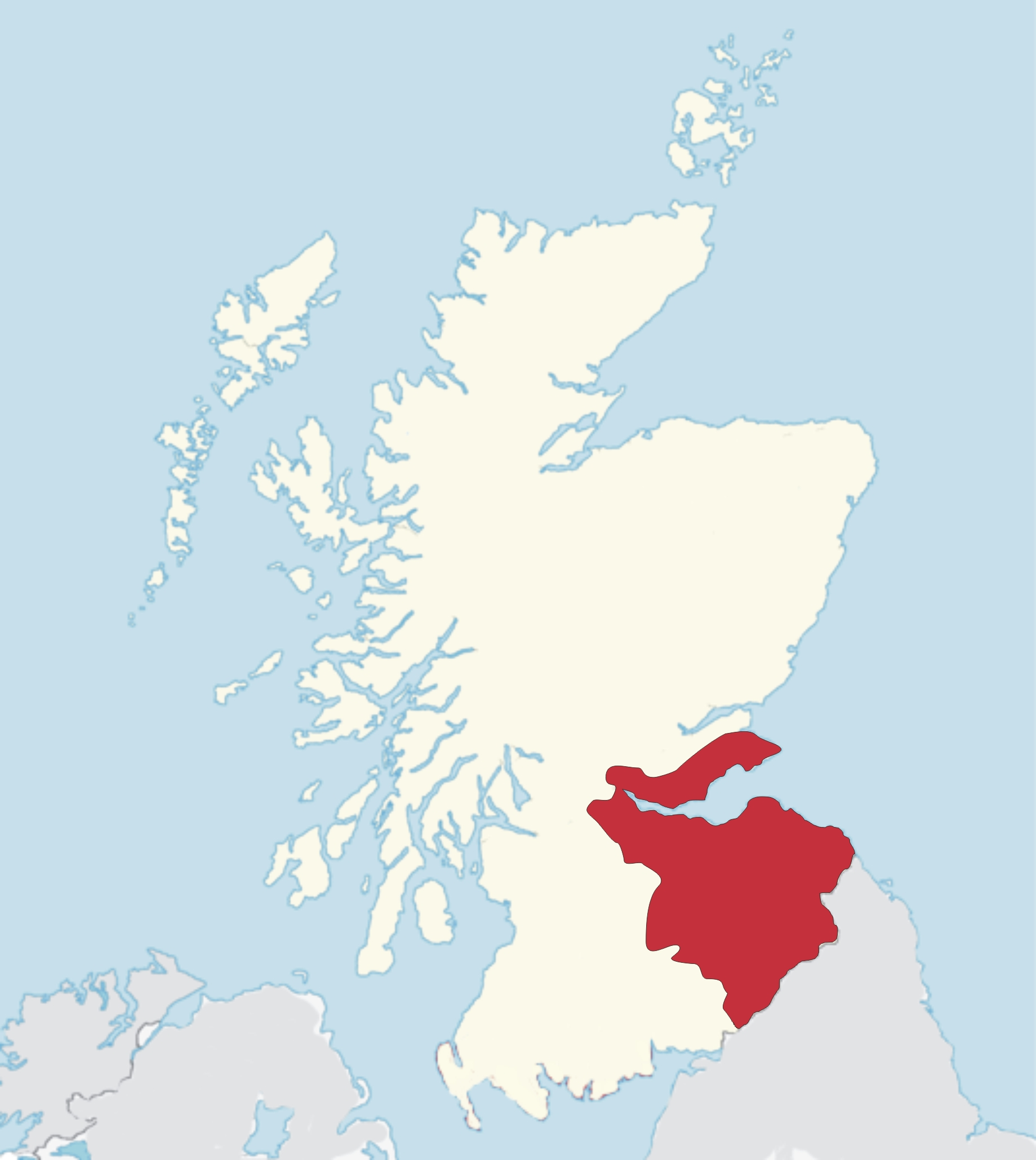

Website
- Official website

The Archdiocese of Saint Andrews and Edinburgh (Latin: Archidioecesis Sancti Andreae et Edimburgensis) is an archdiocese of the Latin Church of the Catholic Church in Scotland. It is the metropolitan see of the province of Saint Andrews and Edinburgh, consisting of the additional suffragan sees of Aberdeen, Argyll and the Isles, Dunkeld, and Galloway. The archdiocese is led by Archbishop Leo Cushley, and its cathedral is St Mary's Cathedral, Edinburgh.

== History ==
After the Scottish Reformation, the Catholic Church abandoned the ancient dioceses and hierarchy. In 1653, the whole of Scotland became under the authority the Prefecture Apostolic of Scotland, which in 1694 was elevated to the Vicariate Apostolic of Scotland.

On 23 July 1727, Scotland was divided into two Vicariates Apostolic, the Lowland District and Highland District. The Lowland District comprised roughly the Scottish Lowlands.

On 13 February 1827, Scotland was divided again into three Vicariate Apostolics, the Eastern District (formerly the Lowland District), the Northern District (formerly the Highland District), and the Western District (created from territory of the other two districts).

The Eastern District comprised the sixteen eastern historic counties of Perthshire, Angus, Kincardineshire, Stirlingshire, Clackmannanshire, Kinross, Fife, West Lothian, Mid Lothian, East Lothian, Peeblesshire, Selkirkshire, Kirkcudbrightshire, Dumfriesshire, Roxburghshire, and Berwickshire.

Following the restoration of the Scottish hierarchy by Pope Leo XIII on 15 March 1878, part of the Eastern District was elevated to the status of an archdiocese with the title St Andrews & Edinburgh.

In Lent 2015, Archbishop Cushley outlined his vision for the future of the archdiocese in a pastoral letter entitled "We Have Found the Messiah". The document stated aim was to "respond to the mission entrusted to him [Archbishop Cushley] by Pope Francis: to bring the joy of the Gospel to contemporary society."

Following the publication of the letter, Archbishop Cushley embarked upon 32 public meetings across the Archdiocese to discuss his vision which includes the possibility of creating larger parish units through either mergers or closures.

The archdiocese controls the Mount Vernon Cemetery. In 2017 the former superintendent of the cemetery was convicted of mis-selling burial plots for 9 years, for example by re-selling used plots, defrauding the archdiocese and families.

== Office holders ==
Prefecture Apostolic of Scotland.

- William Ballantine (appointed on 13 October 1653 – died on 2 September 1661)
- Alexander Dunbar Winchester (appointed on 12 June 1662, resigned 1668, reappointed 1672, resigned again in July 1693)

Vicariate Apostolic of Scotland.

- Thomas Joseph Nicolson (appointed on 7 September 1694 – died on 12 October 1718)
- James Gordon (succeeded on 12 October 1718 – appointed Vicar Apostolic of the Lowland District on 23 July 1727)

Vicariate Apostolic of the Lowland District.

- James Gordon (appointed on 23 July 1727 – died on 18 February 1746)
- Alexander Smith (succeeded on 18 February 1746 – died on 21 August 1767)
- James Grant (succeeded on 21 August 1767 – died on 3 December 1778)
- George Hay (succeeded on 3 December 1778 – retired on 24 August 1805)
- Alexander Cameron (succeeded on 24 August 1805 – retired on 20 August 1825)
- Alexander Paterson (appointed on 20 August 1825 – appointed Vicar Apostolic of the Eastern District 13 February 1827)

Vicariate Apostolic of the Eastern District.

- Alexander Paterson (appointed on 13 February 1827 – died on 30 October 1831)
- Andrew Carruthers (appointed on 28 September 1832 – died on 24 May 1852)
- James Gillis (succeeded on 24 May 1852 – died on 24 February 1864)
- John Menzies Strain (appointed on 2 September 1864 – appointed Archbishop of St Andrews and Edinburgh on 15 March 1878)

Archdiocese of St Andrews and Edinburgh.

- John Menzies Strain (appointed on 15 March 1878 – died on 2 July 1883)
- William Smith (appointed on 2 October and consecrated 28 October 1885 - died on 16 March 1892)
- Angus MacDonald (translated from Argyll and The Isles on 15 July 1892 – died 29 April 1900)
- James August Smith (translated from Dunkeld on 30 August 1900 – died on 25 November 1928)
- Andrew Thomas McDonald, O.S.B. (appointed on 19 July and consecrated on 24 September 1929 – died on 22 May 1950)
- (Cardinal) Gordon Gray (appointed on 20 June and consecrated on 21 September 1951 – retired on 30 May 1985) Died 19 July 1993
- (Cardinal) Keith O'Brien (appointed on 30 May and consecrated on 5 August 1985 – resigned on 25 February 2013). Died 19 March 2018
- Leo Cushley (appointed on 24 July and consecrated on 21 September 2013 – present)

=== Coadjutor Vicars Apostolic ===
- Alexander Cameron (1797–1805)
- John Geddes (1779–1797), did not succeed to see
- James Gillis (1837–1852)
- James Gordon (1705–1718)
- James Grant (1755–1767)
- George Hay (1768–1778)
- Thomas Joseph Nicholson (1694–1718)
- Alexander Patterson (1816–1825)
- Alexander Smith (1735–1746)
- John Wallace (1720–1733), died without succeeding to see

=== Auxiliary bishops ===
- Henry Grey Graham (1917–1930)
- James Monaghan (1970–1989)
- Kevin Lawrence Rafferty (1990–1996)
- Stephen Robson (2012–2013), appointed Bishop of Dunkeld

=== Other priests of this diocese who became bishops ===
- George Henry Bennett, appointed Bishop of Aberdeen in 1918
- Vincent Paul Logan, appointed Bishop of Dunkeld in 1981
- Hugh MacDonald, appointed Vicar Apostolic of Highland District in 1731
- James Maguire, appointed Coadjutor Bishop of Dunkeld in 1939
- William Henry Mellon, appointed Coadjutor Bishop of Galloway in 1935
- Ian Murray, appointed Bishop of Argyll and The Isles in 1999
- George Rigg, appointed Bishop of Dunkeld in 1878
- James Augustine Smith, appointed Bishop of Dunkeld in 1890; later returned here as Archbishop
- Francis Alexander Spalding Warden Thomson, appointed Bishop of Motherwell in 1964
- William Turner, appointed Bishop of Galloway in 1893
