= Armorial of the Catholic Church in Great Britain =

UK coat of arms of the Catholic Church

The Armorial of the Catholic Church in Great Britain are the coats of arms, or elements of heraldry, used by the Catholic dioceses in Great Britain that are registered, referred or explained. The coats of arms are used as visual references as a primary means of identification and also convey something of the heritage and mission of the diocese.

The Catholic Church in Scotland is divided into two provinces while the Catholic Church in England and Wales is divided into five.

== Bishop Conferences ==
Image	Details
	Bishops' Conference of Scotland Blazon: "Azure on a saltire Argent two bishops's croziers in saltire Gules a harrier Or all within a tressure Gules." Granted by the Lyon Court, 3 September 2025.
	Catholic Bishops' Conference of England and Wales

== Province of Birmingham ==
Image	Details
	Birmingham, Blazon: "Per pale Or and Gules a pall Proper, at honour point a cross potent quadrate per pale Gules and Or," representing the cross of St Chad, and a pallium.
	Clifton, Blazon: Azure two bars wavy argent in chief two keys linked one or the other of the second in saltaire with a sword pointing upwards of the second the pommel and hilt of the third in base a fleur-de-lys. "It symbolises the waters significant to the diocese."
	Shrewsbury, Every Bishop of Shrewsbury has had the same coat of arms: An inverted leopard's head with a fleur de lys from St Thomas Cantilupe, superimposed over the red cross of St Chad, mounted on a sword and shield. Green hat and tassels of a bishop. Motto: Nihil Sine Christo Nothing Without Christ

== Province of Cardiff-Menevia ==
Image	Details
	Cardiff-Menevia, Blazon not yet available. Explanation from the diocese: "The shield is in black and golden yellow, the traditional colours of St David, patron of Wales. The ship is an ancient image of the Church; there are two here representing the two local Churches of Cardiff and Menevia."
	Cardiff, Blazon not yet available.
	Wrexham, No arms known. Logo depicts the bishop's crozier, cross and keys of heaven.

== Province of Glasgow ==
Image	Details
	Glasgow, granted 2002 Escutcheon: Vert two keys in saltire, the dexter Or the sinister Argent. Motto: Floreat Verbi Praeconio
	Motherwell, granted 25 April 1990 Escutcheon: Azure a fountain between three fleur-de-lys in pairle that in base reversed Argent. Motto: Sectamini Caritatem
	Paisley, granted 20 November 1989 Escutcheon: Or a saltire chequy Argent and Azure between in the flanks two escallops Gules and in base on a mount of three coupeaux a dove close and reguardant holding in its beak an olive branch slipped all Proper, overall a representation of St Mirren vested and habited as an abbot the dexter hand raised in blessing and the sinister holding a crozier likewise all Proper. Motto: For the good of souls

== Province of Liverpool ==
Image	Details
	Liverpool, Mitre and double cross of an archbishop. Crozier at the right. Blue shield for Saint Mary. Pallium. Red rose of Lancashire. Anchor of the port of Liverpool. Yellow and red tassels of the archbishop's mitre.
	Hallam, No arms known. Logo depicts Our Lady of Perpetual Help.
	Hexham and Newcastle, Blazon: Bleu celeste, a crosier Or between three castles of the second masoned Sable, two in fess and one in base, surmounted by a saltire Argent, fimbriated of the second overall. Motto: Worship Witness Service
	Lancaster, "In the gold band at the top are a red rose representing Lancashire and symbols of water representing Cumbria. Below, on a dark blue background, a castle represents Lancaster and two fleur de lys, traditional symbols of Our Lady."
	Leeds, "Silver fleur-de-lys on a blue for Our Lady of Perpetual Succour, Patroness of the Diocese of Leeds. A gold crozier for St Wilfrid, Patron of the Diocese. Small green shield with silver rose for the ‘County of Broad Acres’ and ‘Yorkshire White Rose’".
	Middlesbrough, No arms known. The diocese uses the personal coat of arms of its bishops.
	Salford, Coat of arms are impaled in the coat of arms of the bishops of Salford displayed in Salford Cathedral. The coat of arms depicts a shield with symbols of Manchester such as bees and the red rose of Lancaster.

== Province of Southwark ==
Image	Details
	Southwark, Instead of a coat of arms, the diocese designed a crest "based on heraldic principles", referring to the three patrons of the diocese: top of the shield is a silver Fleur de Lys on blue symbolising the Immaculate Conception of Mary, bottom right corner the cross of Saint Augustine, bottom left are the three Cornish Choughs of St Thomas of Canterbury.
	Arundel & Brighton, No arms known. The diocese uses the personal coat of arms of its bishops. Motto: Pax Et Gaudium In Domino
	Plymouth, From 1855 to 1985, and from 2026 to the present, the coat of arms of the diocese are impaled upon those of its bishops. Blazon: Barry wavy of eight argent and azure, on a saltire gules two keys in saltire wards in chief or; overall a pastoral staff in pale of the last.
	Portsmouth, "The pose of the hart alludes to the naval and seafaring character of the Diocese of Portsmouth. ... The open mouth of the hart points to the left, which in nautical terms is the port side, thus creating Ports-mouth. ... The star primarily represents Mary, conceived without original sin, the principle Patron of the Diocese.” Motto: In Corde Iesu, In the Heart of Jesus

== Province of St Andrews and Edinburgh ==
Image	Details
	St Andrews and Edinburgh, recorded at unknown date Escutcheon: Azure a saltire Argent charged on each of the upper limbs with a cross pattée fitchée Sable and at the centre a castle triple-towered and embattled of the last masoned of the second and topped with three fans Gules windows and portcullis shut of the last situate on a rock Proper. Motto: Crux Spes Unica
	Aberdeen, granted 16 May 1990 Escutcheon: Azure a fret of salmon Argent; Motto: Together In Christ
	Argyll and the Isles, granted 18 March 1990 Escutcheon: Gyronny of eight Argent and Azure a lymphad sails furled Gules. Motto: In Insulis Nomen Domini
	Dunkeld, granted 4 March 1990 Escutcheon: Purpure an open book Argent binding and fore-edges Or, charged with three passion nails Sable conjoined and piercing a heart Gules, and perching upon the book a dove, wings displayed Argent holding in its beak an olive branch. Motto: Semper Caritas
	Galloway, granted 26 February 2019 Escutcheon: Argent the Kirkmadrine cross Azure. Motto: Te Dominum Laudamus

== Province of Westminster ==
Image	Details
	Westminster, recorded at unknown date Eschutcheon: gules with a pallium argent charged with four crosses formee-fitchee sable edged and fringed or.
	Brentwood Escutcheon: Azure, a cross flory above three suns Or, each charged with an annulet azure.
	East Anglia Motto: Addictus Christi Ministerio
	Northampton "Three fleurs-de-lis in the ‘chief’ or top of the shield, with three choughs in the base. The fleurs-de-lis are to signify Our Lady and the three birds are taken from the arms borne by, or attributed to, St Thomas Becket, Archbishop of Canterbury from 1162 to 1170." Motto: Sub Tuum Praesidium
	Nottingham Every Bishop of Nottingham since has had the same coat of arms impaled on theirs since 1974: A rough, wooden cross in green, rising out of the base of a red shield from the Coat of Arms of the City of Nottingham, and a golden fleur de Lys.

== Other jurisdictions ==
Image	Details
	Bishopric of the Forces, Blazon not available.
	Ukrainian Catholic Eparchy of the Holy Family of London, Blazon not available.
	Personal Ordinariate of Our Lady of Walsingham, Blazon: Argent on a cross Azure five fleur-de-lys of the first impaling Or a fess dancetty between three hearts Gules. The fleur-de-lys refers to Our Lady of Walsingham and the three hearts refer to Saint John Henry Newman.
	Syro-Malabar Catholic Eparchy of Great Britain, No arms known.

== See also ==
- Ecclesiastical heraldry
