= Saint Mirin =

Irish monk and missionary

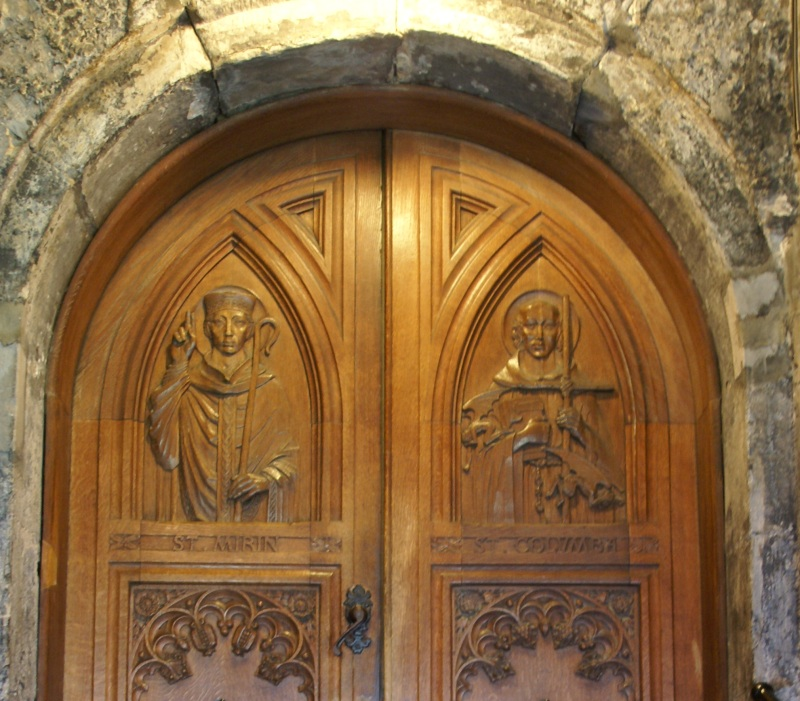
- Door with depiction of St Mirin and St Columba in Paisley Abbey, Renfrewshire, Scotland
- Born: c. 565
- Died: c. 620 (aged 54–55)
- Venerated in: Catholic Church, Orthodox Church
- Feast: 15 September
- Patronage: Patron saint of Paisley, Renfrewshire, Scotland

Saint Mirin (c. 565 – c. 620), also known as Mirren of Benchor (now called Bangor), Merinus, Merryn and Meadhrán, is the patron saint of Paisley, Renfrewshire in Scotland and of the Roman Catholic diocese of Paisley, he was the founder of a religious community which grew to become Paisley Abbey. The shrine of the saint in the abbey became a centre of pilgrimage.

A contemporary of the better known Columba of Iona and disciple of Comgall, he was prior of Bangor Abbey in County Down, Ireland before making his missionary voyage to Scotland.

== History and legend ==
Much of what is known about Mirin is difficult to separate from fable. However, it is believed that he was of noble birth. While still a young boy, his mother took him to the monastery of Bangor Abbey in County Down in the north east of Ireland, where he was placed under the care of Comgall. Mirin later took oversight of the monastery and thus became the prior of Bangor Abbey, where he accepted visitors and sojourners.

Later, Mirin travelled to the camp of the High King of Ireland with the purpose of spreading the Christian faith. Having heard of Mirin's arrival, the king refused to allow him to enter the camp. Mirin, thus slighted, was said to have prayed to God that the king might feel his wife's labour pangs, her time being near. The legend continues that, just as Mirin had prayed, the king fell ill and roared in pain for three days and nights. In desperation, the king sought out Mirin and granted him all he wished, including the right to go out and preach the Gospel to the men of his camp. In response to these concessions, Mirin prayed on his behalf and he was freed from his pain.

Around 580, he was appointed to the west of Scotland and, after a long and difficult journey, arrived where the town of Paisley now stands. The area was in the possession of a powerful local chieftain. This chief took a liking to Mirin and he was allotted a small field near the river in the southern part of town. This plot was called St Mirin's Croft. He founded the first church in Paisley, thought to be at Seedhill and, after his death, the shrine of Saint Mirin became a centre of pilgrimage.

In various charters and Papal Bulls, Mirin is referred to as The glorious confessor, Saint Mirin. His image was engraved on the seal of the Abbey, depicting him in the vestments of a bishop. Around the seal was inscribed the prayer O Mirin, pray for your servants. In King James IV's Charter of 1488 raising Paisley to the status of burgh of barony, one of the reasons cited was "the singular respect we have for the glorious confessor, Saint Mirin".

== Mirin in modern Scotland ==
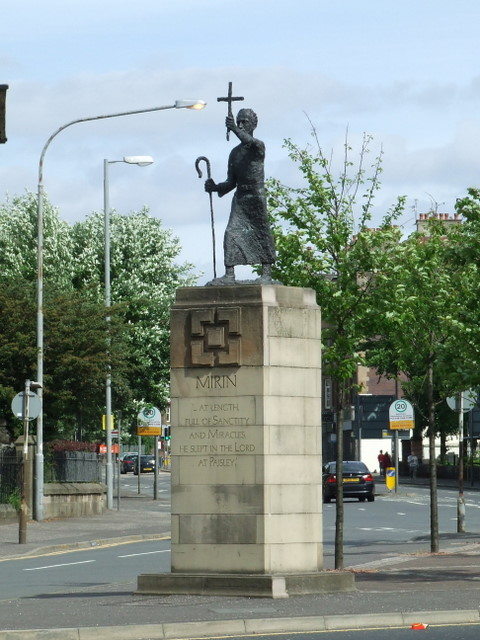
Statue of St Mirin in Paisley

There is a chapel within Paisley Abbey dedicated to Mirin containing a sculptured stone frieze depicting the life of the saint. The Roman Catholic St Mirin's Cathedral is also named in his honour. St Mirren F.C., a football club from Paisley, is named after him. The St Mirin Burn flows into the White Cart Water close to the town centre. He is also commemorated by St Mirren Street which links Paisley Cross to Causeyside Street.

Since the closure of St Mirin's and St Margaret's High School (formerly St Mirin's Academy) in 2001, there has been no school in the town dedicated to the saint. However, there is a St Mirin's Primary School in the Simshill area of the neighbouring city of Glasgow.

Elsewhere in Scotland, the island of Inchmurrin (i.e. Mirin's Island) in Loch Lomond and a farm called Knockmurran (i.e. Mirin's Hill) near Coylton in Ayrshire are named after him. St Mirin's Well can be found near Kilsyth in Stirlingshire.

== Statue ==
A pedestal of blond sandstone, designed by landscape architect Daniel McKendry, bearing the inscription taken from the Aberdeen Breviary At Length Full of Sanctity and Miracles, Mirin Slept in the Lord at Paisley was erected in 2003 opposite St Mirin's Cathedral at the junction of Incle Street, Gauze Street and Glasgow Road in Paisley.

A bronze statue of the saint sculpted by Norman Galbraith was mounted on the pedestal and was unveiled on the saint's day, 15 September 2007, by the Provost of Renfrewshire Councillor Celia Lawson in the presence of the Bishop of Paisley the Rt Rev Philip Tartaglia, the Minister of Paisley Abbey the Rt Rev Alan Birss, the Rt Hon Douglas Alexander MP, Jim Sheridan MP, Hugh Henry MSP, the Deputy Lord Lieutenant of Renfrewshire James Wardrop and the sculptor. The erection and unveiling of the statue were co-ordinated by Daniel McKendry on behalf of the Mirin Project.

== Sources ==
- Brown, Isaac. "Renfrewshire Characters and Scenery". 1824. p42-49.
- Proceedings of the Society; on St. Mirin's Chapel
- Statue of St. Mirin
- Catholic Online; St. Merinus
- History of Paisley;
- Lees, J. Cameron. "The Abbey of Paisley". 1878.
- Aberdeen Breviary. 1484.
- Black, C. Stewart. "The History of Paisley". 1948.
