= St Mirin's Academy =

Location
- Paisley; Renfrewshire; Scotland; 55.848°N 4.417°W

Information
- Type: Secondary school
- Motto: Fortis et Fidelis ("Brave and Faithful")
- Religious affiliation: Roman Catholic
- Patron saint: Saint Mirin
- Opened: 1922
- Closed: 1976
- Oversight: Diocese of Paisley

St Mirin's Academy was a Catholic senior secondary school for boys founded in 1922 in Paisley, Scotland, and which closed in 1976. The school was dedicated to St Mirin, the patron saint of the town and of the Diocese of Paisley. The Academy's Latin motto was Fortis et Fidelis ("Brave and Faithful").

The original buildings were in East Buchanan Street next to St Mirin's Church. In 1933 the school relocated to new buildings in Renfrew Road.

St Mirin's Academy ceased to exist in 1976 when it amalgamated with St Margaret's Senior Secondary (a girls' school) to become St Mirin's and St Margaret's High School, which moved into the buildings of the former John Neilson High School in 1990, and in turn was supplanted by St Andrews Academy in 2001; there has been no school in the town of Paisley named after St Mirin since then.

Neil MacKinnon, the school's longest serving rector (1948–1975), died on 7 May 2009, aged 99.

On 24 April 2010, the former St Mirin's Academy building, then part of the Reid Kerr College complex, was badly damaged by fire. Estimates of damages ran between £250,000 and £500,000. The building was demolished in October 2010.

== Notable alumni ==
- Gerry Rafferty - singer, musician and songwriter
- John Byrne - painter and playwright
- David Hay - footballer
- Joe Egan - singer, musician and songwriter
- Hugh Henry - Labour politician
- John Reid - music manager
- Willie Young - footballer
- James McMillan - author and historian
- Fergus Hall - artist
- Gerard Butler - actor
- James Goodfellow - inventor of the ATM
- John Duignan - writer and economist
