= Archdiocese of Glasgow (modern) =

Latin Catholic archdiocese in Scotland

Archdiocese of Glasgow Archidioecesis Glasguensis Sgìre-àrd-easbaig Ghlaschu

Catholic
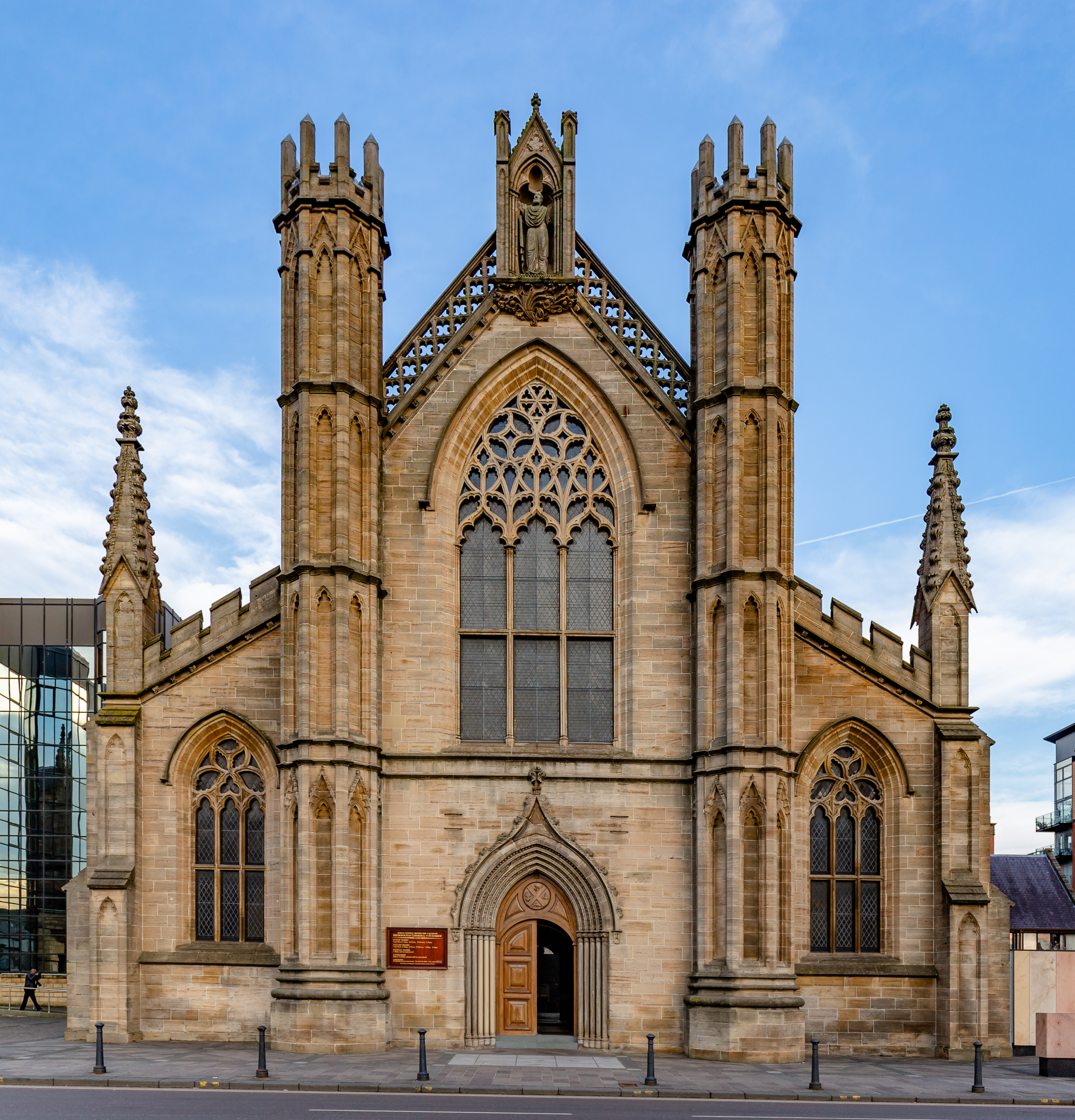
- Metropolitan Cathedral Church of Saint Andrew, Glasgow

- Coat of arms of the Archdiocese of Glasgow

Location
- Country: Scotland
- Territory: Most of the city of Glasgow and the council areas of East and West Dunbartonshire, plus small parts of the council areas of Argyll and Bute, Stirling, North and South Lanarkshire
- Ecclesiastical province: Glasgow
- Metropolitan: Glasgow
- Coordinates: 55.877°N 4.285°W

Statistics
- Area: 825 km^{2} (319 sq mi)
- Population: Total; Catholics: (as of 2021); 822,300; 218,170 (26.5%)
- Parishes: 89

Information
- Denomination: Catholic
- Sui iuris church: Latin Church
- Rite: Roman Rite
- Established: 4 March 1878
- Cathedral: St Andrew's Cathedral, Glasgow
- Secular priests: 186

Current leadership
- Pope: Leo XIV
- Bishop: William Nolan
- Vicar General: Mgr Hugh Canon Bradley

Map
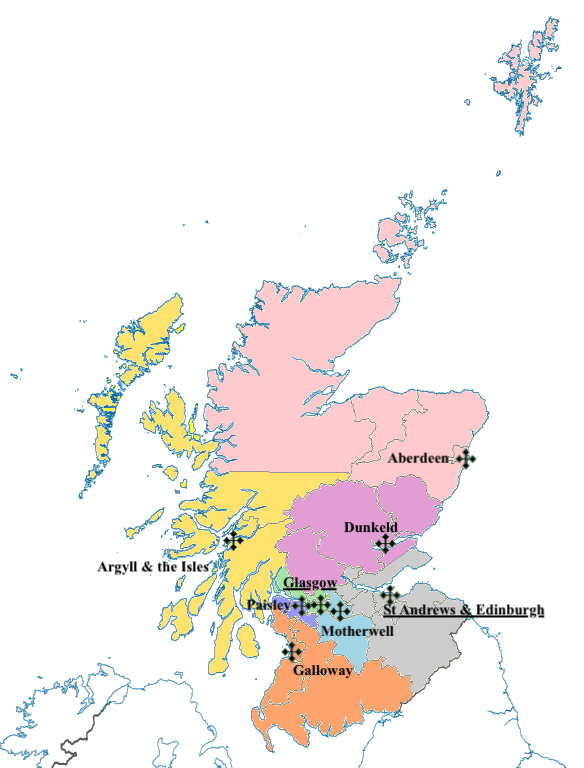
- Archdiocese of Glasgow Diocese of Motherwell Diocese of Paisley

Website
- rcag.org.uk

The Archdiocese of Glasgow (Latin: Archidioecesis Glasguensis) is the Latin Catholic metropolitan see of the Province of Glasgow in central Scotland. The episcopal seat of the developing diocese was established by Saint Kentigern in the 6th century AD. It is one of two catholic metropolitan archdioceses of the Catholic Church in Scotland: the only archdioceses in Scotland. (Note: The Catholic Church in Scotland has no non-metropolitan archdioceses i.e. all other dioceses are suffragans of a metropolitan bishop.) It is the elder of the two bishoprics. Innocent VIII first raised Glasgow a metropolitan archbishopric in 1492. (Note: Per the 1913 Catholic Encyclopedia, "On 9 January 1492, Innocent VIII raised the see to metropolitan rank…".) The Metropolis has the dioceses of Motherwell and Paisley as suffragans within the Ecclesiastical Province.

The modern archdiocese of Glasgow was re-established in 1878 and currently consists of 106 parishes served by 228 priests (2003 figures) covering an area of 1,165 square kilometres (450 sq mi) in the West of Scotland. It includes the city of Glasgow and extends to the town of Cumbernauld in the east, northwards to Bearsden, Bishopbriggs and Milngavie and westwards to Dumbarton, Balloch and Garelochhead. The Catholic population of the diocese is 224,344 (28.8%) out of a total population of 779,490 (2003 figures). Membership dropped to 215,000 (26,5 % out of the total population) by 2016.

Archbishop emeritus Mario Joseph Conti was appointed in 2002 by Pope John Paul II. Upon Conti's resignation in July 2012, having passed the required age of 75, Pope Benedict XVI appointed Philip Tartaglia, the Bishop of Paisley, to succeed him. Tartaglia was installed as archbishop in September 2012. He died in office on 13 January 2021: Saint Kentigern's feast day.

Not far from St. Enoch Square, and directly adjacent the St. Enoch Centre (the site of an early church of Glasgow's co-founding patron Saint Teneu on the River Clyde), the seat of the archbishop is St Andrew's Cathedral, Glasgow.

== History ==
Originally established by Saint Mungo, the diocese of Glasgow became important in the 12th century. It was organized by King David I of Scotland and John the Chaplain, Bishop of Glasgow. The bishopric became one of the largest and wealthiest in the Kingdom of Scotland, bringing wealth and status to the town. Somewhere between 1175 and 1178 this position was strengthened even further when Bishop Jocelin obtained for the episcopal settlement the status of burgh from King William I of Scotland, allowing the settlement to expand with the benefits of trading monopolies and other legal guarantees. Sometime between 1189 and 1195 this status was supplemented by an annual fair, which survives to this day as the Glasgow Fair.

Until 1560, when practice of the Catholic faith was suppressed by act of the Parliament of Scotland nearly all the bishops of Glasgow took an active share in the government of the country, whether as chancellors or treasurers of the kingdom or as members of regency during the minority of a sovereign. Robert Wishart (consecrated 1272, died 1316) was conspicuous for his patriotism during the Scottish War of Independence from England, and was the close friend of William Wallace and Robert Bruce. William Turnbull (consecrated 1447, died 1454) obtained in 1450 from Pope Nicholas V the charter of foundation for the University of Glasgow.

On 9 January 1492, Pope Innocent VIII raised the see to metropolitan rank, attaching to it the suffragan dioceses of Argyle, Dunblane, Dunkeld, and Galloway. James Beaton, nephew of the celebrated cardinal of the same surname, was the fourth and last archbishop of the old hierarchy.

In 1560, eight years after his nomination, he was forced to retire to France, where he acted as confidential agent of Mary, Queen of Scots, and later openly as ambassador for James VI, until his death in Paris, 25 April 1603. He carried away with him the diocesan records, "Registrum Vetus Ecclesiae Cathedralis Glasguensis", in handwriting of the 12th and 13th centuries, and "Liber Ruber Ecclesiae Glasguensis", with entries from about 1400 to 1476. These, along with other records, were in 1843 printed in a volume for the Maitland Club under the title: "Registrum Episcopatus Glasguensis: Munimenta Ecclesiae Metropolitanae Glasguensis a sede restauratâ saeculo ineunte XII ad reformatam religionem". A memorial of those times still remains in the old cathedral of St. Mungo, which was begun by Jocelin (consecrated 1175, died 1199) and received its last additions from Robert Blackadder (consecrated 1484, died 1508).

Glasgow did not again become a centre of Catholic life until about the beginning of the 19th century during the process of Catholic Emancipation. The progress of the Industrial Revolution also began to draw to the city and its neighbourhood Catholics from the Scottish Highlands and later, in far greater numbers, from Ireland. The arrival of the Irish necessitated Rev Andrew Scott, the sole Priest in Glasgow to begin the erection of the Catholic Cathedral in Clyde St in 1814 'for his vast Irish flock'.

Before 1795 the majority of the Catholics in Glasgow were from the Highlands. Mass had been celebrated from 1776 onwards by Bishop Hay and Bishop Geddes in a clandestine manner, first in High St, and later at the foot of the Saltmarket. In the 1780s a large colony of MacDonalds of Glengarry, on their way to America were forced to seek shelter from inclement weather, stayed on to work in the Glasgow Mills of the Monteith family. A priest from their native area joined them in 1792. In 1794 many of the MacDonalds left the city to join the regiment of Glengarry Fencibles. In 1795 the remainder of this group along with clan members from Glengarry sailed for America. They were accompanied by their pastor, Father Alexander MacDonald. Later, in the nineteenth century Irish Catholics arrived in greater numbers and had an effect on the city of Glasgow.

In 1827, the Holy See erected the Vicariate Apostolic of the Western District of Scotland. It was headed by a vicar apostolic, who was a consecrated bishop and who held a titular see. On the resignation of John Gray in 1869, archbishop Charles Petre Eyre was appointed the Apostolic Administrator of the Western District. On the Restoration of the Scottish hierarchy by Pope Leo XIII, 4 March 1878, the district was divided into the archdiocese of Glasgow, the Diocese of Argyll and the Isles and the Diocese of Galloway. archbishop Eyre was appointed the first Catholic archbishop of Glasgow since the Scottish Reformation.

By 1877, a year prior to the institution of the current Catholic archdiocese, Charles Eyre could record that in Glasgow city there were nineteen parishes, served by fifty-two priests, and in the county of Dunbarton, five parishes and seven priests.

Lanarkshire, which became Motherwell diocese in 1947–48, had seventeen parishes and twenty-two priests, while Renfrewshire, which became Paisley diocese in 1947–48, had eleven parishes and sixteen priests.

To train clergy, Eyre founded St Peter's College at Partickhill in 1874, and also encouraged the opening at Dowanhill in 1894 of Notre Dame teacher-training college. He was also committed to creating new parishes and breaking up over-large ones which he felt 'were almost dioceses in themselves'. A cathedral chapter was erected on 3 January 1884.

During the episcopate of his successor, John Aloysius Maguire, the Education (Scotland) Act 1918 was passed. Financial difficulties, including the triple burden of salaries, building costs, and rising educational expectations necessitated a settlement.

Maguire supported the War effort of 1914–18. In 1917, soldier-students, among them James Black, the future Bishop of Paisley, went to the front from St Peter's College, and two of the military chaplains from the archdiocese were killed. Although the seminary never closed during the First World War, at one point it housed only a single student and the rector.

Archbishop emeritus Mario Joseph Conti was appointed in 2002 by Pope John Paul II, and on Tuesday, 24 July 2012, Pope Benedict XVI accepted Conti's resignation and appointed Philip Tartaglia, the bishop of Paisley, to succeed Conti and be formally installed in September 2012. Following Tartaglia's death from Covid-19 in 2020, Pope Francis appointed William Nolan, bishop of Galloway, as his successor.

== Bishops ==
=== Past and present ordinaries ===
The following is a list of the modern archbishops of Glasgow and its precursor office:

Vicars Apostolic of the Western District

- Ranald MacDonald (appointed 13 February 1827 – died 20 September 1832)
- Andrew Scott (succeeded 20 September 1832 – resigned 15 October 1845)
- John Murdoch (succeeded 15 October 1845 – died 15 December 1865)
- John Gray (succeeded 15 December 1865 – resigned 4 March 1869)
- Charles Petre Eyre (appointed Apostolic Administrator 16 April 1869 – elevated archbishop of Glasgow 15 March 1878); see below

Archbishops of Glasgow

- Charles Petre Eyre (appointed 15 March 1878 – died 27 March 1902); see above
- John Aloysius Maguire (appointed 4 August 1902 – died 14 October 1920)
- (Sede vacante, 14 October 1920 – 24 February 1922)
- Donald Mackintosh (appointed 24 February 1922 – died 8 December 1943)
- Donald Alphonsus Campbell (appointed 6 January 1945 – died 22 July 1963)
- James Donald Scanlan (appointed 29 January 1964 – retired 23 April 1974)
- Thomas Winning (appointed 23 April 1974 – died 17 June 2001) (Cardinal in 1994)
- Mario Conti (installed 22 February 2002 – retired 24 July 2012)
- Philip Tartaglia (installed 8 September 2012 – died 13 January 2021)
- William Nolan (installed February 2022)

=== Coadjutor Vicars Apostolic ===
- John Gray (1862–1865)
- James Lynch, C.M. (1866–1869), did not succeed to see; appointed Coadjutor Bishop of Kildare and Leighlin, Ireland
- John Murdoch (1833–1846)
- Andrew Scott (1827–1832)
- Alexander Smith (1847–1861), died without succeeding to see

=== Coadjutor archbishop ===
- Donald Aloysius Mackintosh (1912–1919), died without succeeding to see

=== Auxiliary Bishops ===
- John Aloysius Maguire (1894–1902), appointed archbishop here
- James Ward (1960–1973)
- Joseph Devine (1977–1983), appointed Bishop of Motherwell
- Charles McDonald Renfrew (1977–1992)
- John Aloysius Mone (1984–1988), appointed Bishop of Paisley
- Thomas Joseph Winning (1971–1974), appointed archbishop here; future Cardinal

=== Other priests of this diocese who became bishops ===
- James Black, appointed Bishop of Paisley in 1948
- Edward Wilson Douglas, appointed Bishop of Motherwell in 1948
- Henry Grey Graham, appointed auxiliary bishop of Saint Andrews and Edinburgh in 1917
- Kenneth Grant, appointed Bishop of Argyll and The Isles in 1945
- John Keenan, appointed Bishop of Paisley in 2014
- Peter Antony Moran (priest here, 1959–1992), appointed Bishop of Aberdeen in 2003
- William Andrew Hart, appointed Bishop of Dunkeld in 1955
- Angus MacDonald, appointed Bishop of Argyll and The Isles in 1878
- Hugh MacDonald, C.SS.R. (priest here, 1867–1871), appointed Bishop of Aberdeen in 1890
- Angus MacFarlane, appointed Bishop of Dunkeld in 1901
- James William McCarthy, appointed Bishop of Galloway in 1914
- Stephen McGill, P.S.S. (priest here, 1936), appointed Bishop of Argyll and The Isles in 1960
- John McLachlan, appointed Bishop of Galloway in 1878
- George John Smith, appointed Bishop of Argyll and The Isles in 1892
- Philip Tartaglia, appointed Bishop of Paisley in 2005; later returned here as archbishop
- John Toner, appointed Bishop of Dunkeld in 1914
- Roderick Wright (priest here, 1964–1974), appointed Bishop of Argyll and The Isles in 1990

== Parishes ==
Parishes within Glasgow

- St Andrew's Cathedral, Glasgow
- St. Agnes' – Lambhill
- St. Albert's – Pollokshields
- St. Aloysius – Garnethill
- St. Aloysius – Springburn
- St. Alphonsus – Calton
- St. Anne's – Denniston
- St. Anthony's – Govan
- St. Augustine's – Milton
- St. Barnabas' – Shettleston
- St. Bartholomew's – Castlemilk
- St. Benedict's – Drumchapel
- St. Bernadette's – Carntyne
- St. Bernard's – South Nitshill
- St. Brendan's – Yoker
- St. Brigid's – Toryglen
- St. Catherine's – North Balornock
- St. Charles' – North Kelvinside
- Christ the King – Kings Park
- St. Columba's – Woodside
- St. Constantine's – Govan
- St. Conval's – Pollok
- Corpus Christi – Scotstounhill
- St. Gabriel's – Merrylee
- St. Gregory's – Wyndford
- St. Helen's – Langside
- Holy Cross – Crosshill
- Holy Name – Mansewood
- Immaculate Conception – Maryhill
- Immaculate Heart of Mary – Balornock
- St. James' – Crookston
- St. Joachim's – Carmyle
- Blessed John Duns Scotus – Gorbals
- St. Joseph's – Tollcross
- St. Jude's and St John Ogilvie – Barlanark
- St. Laurence's – Drumchapel
- St. Leo's – Dumbreck
- St. Louise's – Deaconsbank
- St. Margaret Mary's – Castlemilk
- St. Maria Goretti's – Cranhill
- St. Mary's – Calton
- St. Mary Immaculate – Pollokshaws
- St. Michael's – Parkhead
- St. Mungo's – Townhead
- St. Ninian's – Knightswood
- Our Lady of Good Counsel – Denniston
- Our Lady of Lourdes – Cardonald
- Our Lady of Perpetual Succour – Broomhill
- Our Lady & St. George's – Penilee
- St. Patrick's – Anderston
- St. Paul's – Shettleston
- St. Paul's – Whiteinch
- St Peter's – Partick
- St. Philomena's – Provanmill
- St. Robert's – Househilwood
- St. Roch's – Garngad
- Sacred Heart – Bridgeton
- St. Simon's – Partick
- St. Teresa of Lisieux – Possilpark
- St. Thomas Apostle – Riddrie
- St. Vincent de Paul – Thornliebank
- Glasgow University – Turnbull Hall
- Strathclyde University Chaplaincy

Parishes outwith the Glasgow area

- Our Lady & St. Mark's – Alexandria
- Ss Peter and Paul – Arrochar
- St. Kessog's – Balloch
- St. Andrew's – Bearsden
- St. Dominic's – Bishopbriggs
- St. Matthew's – Bishopbriggs
- St. Ronan's – Bonhill
- St. Mahew's – Cardross
- St. Eunan's – Clydebank
- St. Margaret's – Clydebank
- Our Holy Redeemer's – Clydebank
- Our Lady & St. Helen's – Condorrat
- Holy Cross – Croy
- St. Joseph's – Cumbernauld
- St. Lucy's – Cumbernauld
- Sacred Heart – Cumbernauld
- St. Stephen's – Dalmuir
- St. Michael's – Dumbarton
- St. Patrick's – Dumbarton
- St. Peter's – Dumbarton
- St. Mary's – Duntocher
- St. Joseph's – Faifley
- St. Joseph's – Helensburgh
- St. Flannan's – Kirkintilloch
- Holy Family and St. Ninian – Kirkintilloch
- St. Joseph's – Milngavie
- St. Patrick's – Old Kilpatrick
- St. Martin of Tours – Renton
- St. Gildas' – Rosneath
- St. John of the Cross – Twechar

Former Parishes

- All Saints – Barmulloch (1969, 1971; closed 2014)
- St Bonaventure – Oatlands (1952, 1953; closed 1993; demolished)
- St. Francis' – Gorbals (1868, 1881: community centre 1996)
- Good Shepherd – Dalbeth (1948, 1902; closed 1975; demolished 1996)
- St. John the Evangelist – Gorbals (1846, 1897; closed 1982; demolished)
- St. John Ogilvie – Easterhouse (1957, 1960; closed 2008; demolished)
- St. Joseph's – Woodside (1850; closed 1984; demolished)
- St. Luke's – Gorbals (1905; closed)
- St. Martin's – Castlemilk (1958, 1961; closed 2010)
- St. Monica's – Milton (1969, 1974; closed)
- St. Nicholas' – Bellgrove (1949, 1929; demolished 1979)
- Our Lady of the Assumption – Ruchill (1952, 1956; closed 2000s)
- Our Lady of Consolation – Govanhill (1966, 1971; closed 2004)
- Our Lady of Fatima – Dalmarnock (1950, 1953; closed 2004; demolished)
- Our Lady & St. Margaret's – Kinning Park (1874, 1883; damaged by fire; demolished)
- Our Lady Queen of Peace – Glasgow (1978; closed 1987)
- Our Lady Star of the Sea – Garelochhead (1964, 1968; closed 2005)
- St. Philip's – Ruchazie (1954, 1958; closed 2014)
- St. Pius X – Drumchapel (1954, 1957; closed)
- St. Stephen's - Sighthill (1968, 1972; demolished)
- St. Vincent's – Calton (1859: closed 1902; demolished)

== See also ==
- Presbytery of Glasgow (Church of Scotland)
- Diocese of Glasgow and Galloway (Scottish Episcopal Church)
