= James Ward (bishop) =

Auxiliary bishop of Glasgow from 1960 to 1973

The Right Reverend James Ward
- Auxiliary Bishop of Glasgow
- Church: Roman Catholic
- Appointed: 2 July 1960
- Term ended: 21 October 1973
- Other post: Titular bishop of Sita (1960–73)

Orders
- Ordination: 29 June 1929
- Consecration: 28 September 1960 by Donald Campbell

Personal details
- Born: 4 September 1905 Dumbarton, Dunbartonshire, Scotland
- Died: 21 October 1973 (aged 68) Crosshill, Glasgow, Scotland
- Buried: Dalbeth Cemetery, Glasgow
- Education: St Aloysius' College, Glasgow
- Alma mater: St Peter's College, Bearsden
- Motto: Pascere gregem

James Ward (4 September 1905 – 21 October 1973) was a Scottish Catholic clergyman who served as an Auxiliary bishop of Glasgow from 1960 until 1973.

== Life ==
James Ward was born in Dumbarton on 4 September 1905. He was educated at St Aloysius' College, which he entered in 1918. In 1923, he entered St Peter's College in Bearsden to train for the priesthood and was ordained on 29 June 1929 for the Archdiocese of Glasgow. He served at Immaculate Conception, Maryhill (1929) and St Charles, Glasgow (1929–48). He was Chaplain to Notre Dame Training College (1948–50). He was named chancellor of the Archdiocese in 1947, then Vicar general and treasurer in 1948.

He was appointed Auxiliary bishop of Glasgow and Titular bishop of Sita on 2 July 1960. He received Episcopal consecration on 28 September 1960 at St Andrew's Cathedral, Glasgow. The principal consecrator was Archbishop Donald Campbell of Glasgow. The principal co-consecrators were Bishop James Black of Paisley and Bishop William Hart of Dunkeld. He attended all four sessions of the Second Vatican Council of 1962–65. In March 1965, he was appointed parish priest of Holy Cross, Crosshill, and remained there until his death.

He died on 21 October 1973 aged 68.
