= Black bishop (disambiguation) =

Black Bishop may refer to:

- Black bishop, a chess piece
- Black bishop (Euplectes gierowii), a species of passerine bird native to Africa
- Black Bishop, the alias of the Marvel Comics character Harry Leland

== See also ==
- James Black (bishop), was the first Roman Catholic Bishop of Paisley, Scotland
