= Apostolic Vicariate of the Western District =

The Vicariate Apostolic of the Western District may refer to these Latin Catholic pre-diocesan jurisdictions in the UK:

- Apostolic Vicariate of the Western District (England and Wales), a precursor of the Roman Catholic Diocese of Clifton.
- Apostolic Vicariate of the Western District (Scotland), a precursor of the restored Roman Catholic Archdiocese of Glasgow.
