= James Francis McMillan =

Scottish historian and author

James Francis McMillan (10 April 1948 – 22 February 2010) was a Scottish historian and author, head of the History Department of the University of Strathclyde, a fellow of the Royal Society of Edinburgh and Professor of History at the University of Edinburgh.

== Early years ==
McMillan was born in Glasgow on 10 April 1948. He grew up in Paisley and attended St Mirin's Academy. He graduated in modern history from the University of Glasgow in 1969 and obtained his doctorate from Balliol College, Oxford.

== Academic career ==
McMillan was a specialist in the history of modern France. He was a lecturer at York University from 1972 to 1992 and a professor of European history at the University of Strathclyde in Glasgow, where he headed the Department of History. In 1996, McMillan was named a fellow of the Royal Society of Edinburgh. Three years later, in 1999, he was appointed to the Richard Pares chair of history at the University of Edinburgh

== Death and legacy ==
On 22 February 2010 McMillan died of cancer at his home in Airdrie. He was 61. His funeral mass took place at St Mirin's Cathedral in Paisley where the eulogy was given by Professor Tom Devine.

== Works ==
- Housewife or Harlot: The Place of Women in French Society, 1870–1940 (1981).
- Dreyfus to De Gaulle: Politics and Society in France 1898–1969 (1985).
- France and Women, 1789–1914 (2000).
