= Charles McDonald Renfrew =

Scottish Catholic bishop (1929–1992)

The Right Reverend Charles McDonald Renfrew
- Auxiliary Bishop of Glasgow
- Church: Roman Catholic
- Appointed: 5 May 1977
- Term ended: 27 February 1992
- Other post: Titular Bishop of Abula

Orders
- Ordination: 4 April 1953
- Consecration: 31 May 1977 by Thomas Winning

Personal details
- Born: 21 June 1929 Glasgow, Scotland
- Died: 27 February 1992 (aged 62) Glasgow, Scotland
- Education: St Aloysius' College, Glasgow; Scots College, Rome

Charles McDonald Renfrew (21 June 1929 – 7 February 1992) was a Scottish Catholic prelate who served as an auxiliary bishop of Glasgow.

== Biography ==
He was born in Glasgow on 21 June 1929. He studied for the priesthood at the Pontifical Scots College, Rome and was ordained on 4 April 1953. He was curate at the parish of the Immaculate Conception, Maryhill 1953–56, a professor at Blairs College 1956–57, procurator at Blairs 1957–61 and was rector of St Vincent's College, Langbank 1961–74. He was named Vicar general of Glasgow in 1974. He was chaplain to Bon Secours Hospital in Glasgow 1975–89.

He was appointed Auxiliary bishop of Glasgow and titular bishop of Abula, and was consecrated to the Episcopate on 31 May 1977 at St Francis Church, Gorbals. The principal consecrator was Archbishop Thomas Winning of Glasgow and the principal co-consecrators were Bishop Francis Thomson of Motherwell and Bishop Stephen McGill of Paisley.

He died on 27 February 1992 at the Western Infirmary aged 62.
