= St Anne's Church, Glasgow =

Coordinates: 55.855742°N 4.218421°W

St Anne's Church
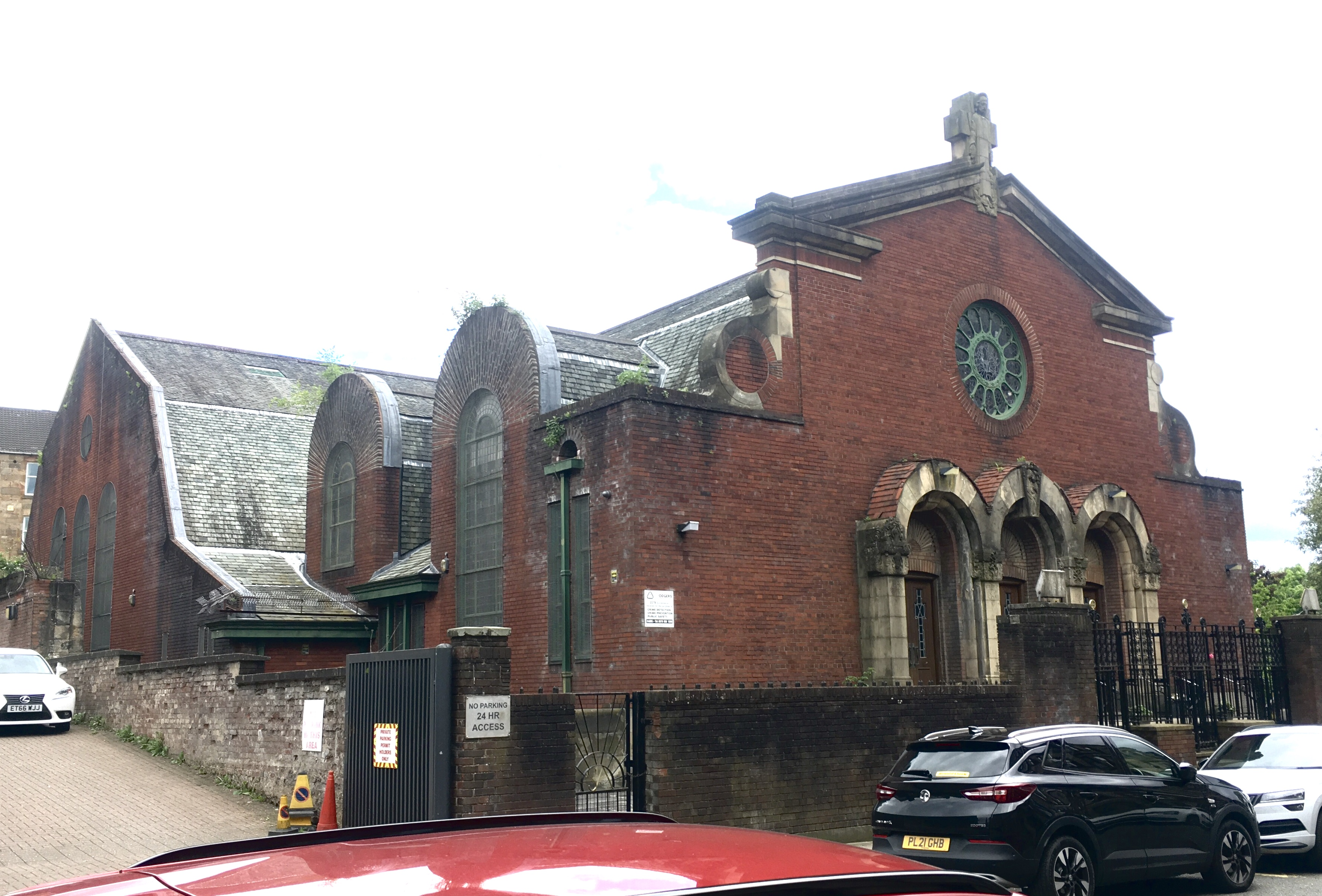

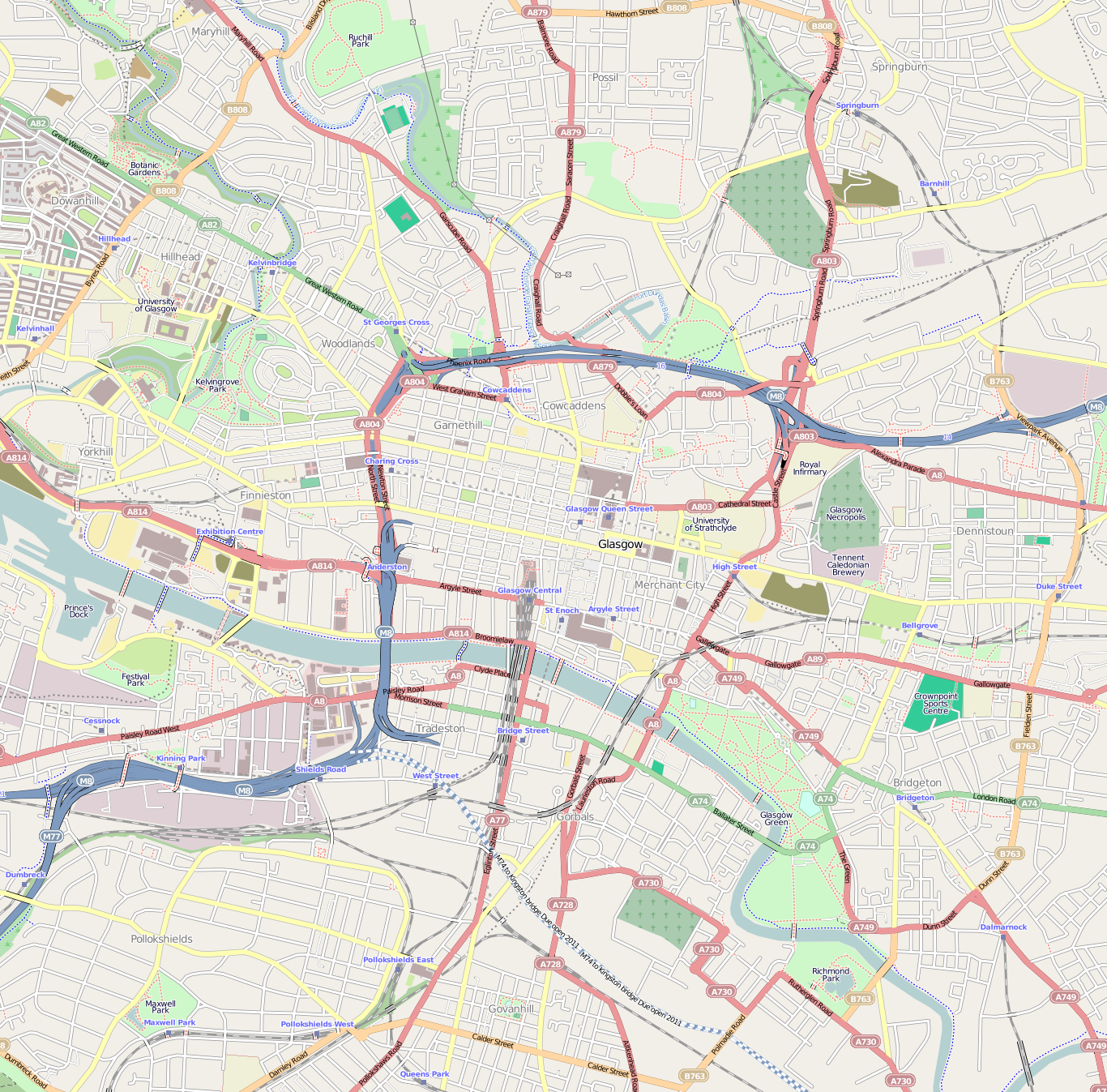
- Location in Glasgow
- Location: Dennistoun, Glasgow
- Country: Scotland
- Denomination: Roman Catholic
- Website: St Anne's, Glasgow

History
- Status: Parish church
- Dedication: Saint Anne

Architecture
- Functional status: Active
- Heritage designation: Category A listed
- Designated: 27 November 1979
- Architect: Jack Coia
- Style: Romanesque, Byzantine
- Groundbreaking: 1932
- Completed: 1933

Administration
- Province: Glasgow
- Archdiocese: Glasgow
- Deanery: City East

Clergy
- Archbishop: Most Reverend Philip Tartaglia PhB STD
- Priest: Rev Leszek Rygiewicz SChr

St Anne's Church is a parish of the Roman Catholic Church in Glasgow, Scotland, in the Archdiocese of Glasgow. The parish church, situated on Whitevale Street in the Dennistoun area, is a category A listed building.

== History ==
The parish was established in 1899 to serve Catholics in Glasgow's East End. The first church was built on David Street in the Gallowgate area, and a parochial school added. Eventually, the parish outgrew both church and school, and so on the advice of Archbishop Donald MacKintosh, the school was expanded into the church. The parish acquired land from the Daughters of Charity of Saint Vincent de Paul which they had used for a children's refuge and hostel, and the new church was constructed there in 1933.

The architect was Jack Coia, who designed the church in a mixture of Romanesque and Byzantine Revival styles. Coia would design around 30 buildings for the Catholic Church.

The church takes its cruciform shape from a series of semi-circular reinforced concrete portals converging on a central apex. Archbishop Mario Conti described St Anne's as the "Jewel of the Archdiocese".

== Parish ==
The church has four Sunday Masses, at 5:00pm on Saturday and at 10:00am, 11:30am and 6:00pm on Sunday. There are also weekday Masses at 10:00am.

== See also ==
- Catholic Church in Scotland
