= Charles Renfrew =

Charles Renfrew may refer to:

- Charles Byron Renfrew (1928–2017), United States district judge
- Charles McDonald Renfrew (1929–1992), Scottish Catholic prelate
