= SCMO =

SCMO may refer to:

- Scottish Catholic Media Office
- Subsidiary Communications Multiplex Operation, a subcarrier on a broadcasting station
- Supply Chain Management Outsource, an advisory firm specialized in logistics
