= Our Lady of Good Counsel Church, Glasgow =

Coordinates: 55.8626°N 4.2224°W

Our Lady of Good Counsel
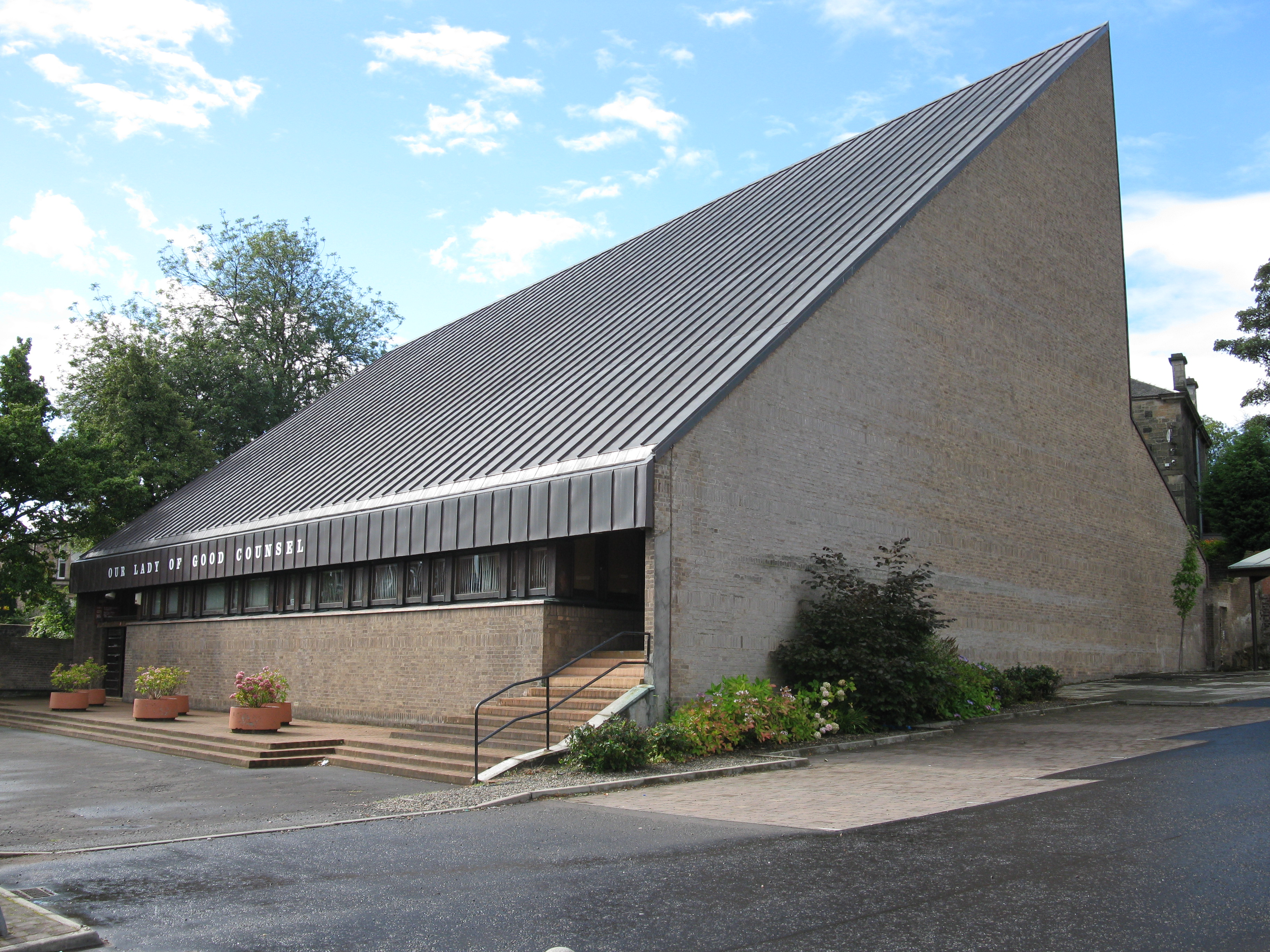

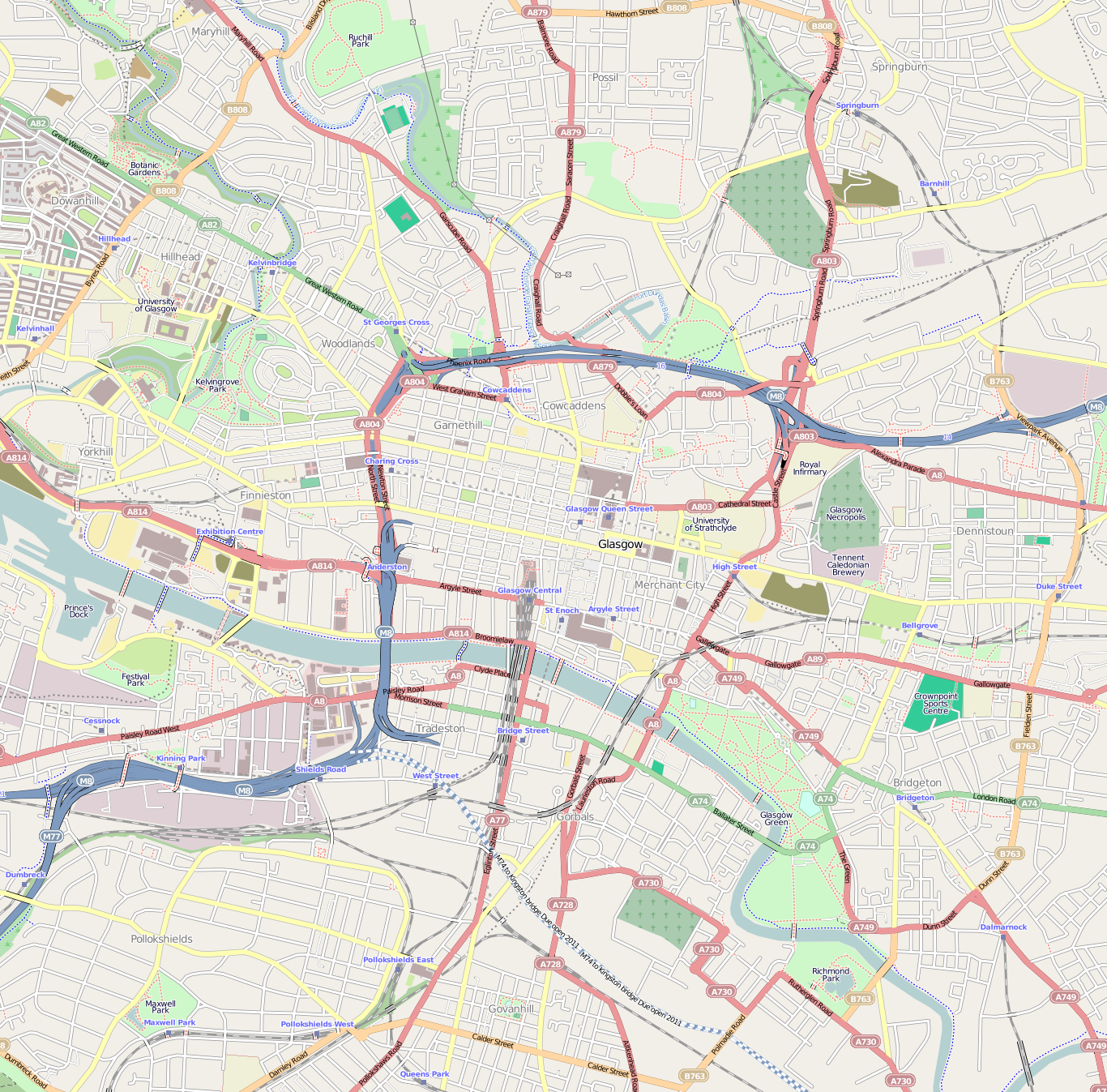
- Location in Glasgow
- Location: Dennistoun, Glasgow
- Country: Scotland
- Denomination: Roman Catholic
- Website: Our Lady of Good Counsel Parish, Glasgow

History
- Status: Parish church
- Dedication: Our Lady of Good Counsel

Architecture
- Functional status: Active
- Heritage designation: Category A listed
- Designated: 23 September 1994
- Architect: Gillespie, Kidd and Coia
- Groundbreaking: 1964
- Completed: 1965

Administration
- Province: Glasgow
- Archdiocese: Glasgow
- Deanery: City East

Clergy
- Archbishop: Most Reverend Philip Tartaglia PhB STD

Our Lady of Good Counsel Church is a Roman Catholic Parish Church in the Dennistoun area of Glasgow, Scotland. It is situated on Craigpark. It is a category A listed building.

== History ==
The church was constructed in 1964-65. The architects were Gillespie, Kidd and Coia. In 1966 they were awarded the bronze regional medal of the RIBA and the Civic Trust Award for this building.

== Parish ==
The church has three Sunday Masses they are at 5:30pm on Saturday, 11:00am and 5:30pm on Sunday. There are also weekday Masses at 10:00am.

== See also ==
- Catholic Church in Scotland
- Roman Catholic Archdiocese of Glasgow
