= Donald Mackintosh (bishop) =

Scottish clergyman (1876–1943)

The Most Reverend Donald Mackintosh
- Archbishop of Glasgow
- Church: Roman Catholic
- Archdiocese: Glasgow
- Appointed: 24 February 1922
- Term ended: 8 December 1943
- Predecessor: John Maguire
- Successor: Donald Campbell

Orders
- Ordination: 1 November 1900 by Pietro Respighi
- Consecration: 21 May 1922 by Gaetano de Lai
- Rank: Archbishop

Personal details
- Born: 10 October 1876 Inverness, Scotland
- Died: 8 December 1943 (aged 67) Bearsden, Scotland
- Buried: St Peter's Cemetery, Glasgow
- Education: Blairs College
- Alma mater: Scots College in Rome, Pontifical Gregorian University
- Motto: Ri guaillibh a chéile

Donald Mackintosh (10 October 1876 – 8 December 1943) was a Scottish clergyman who served as the Roman Catholic Archbishop of Glasgow from 1922 to 1943.

== Life ==
Donald Mackintosh was born on 10 October 1876 at Glasnacardoch, Inverness. Until he went to school his only language was Gaelic. He studied for the priesthood at Blairs College near Aberdeen and the Paris lower seminary, followed by Scots College in Rome and the Pontifical Gregorian University.

He was ordained priest on 1 November 1900. Soon afterwards he appointed Vice-Rector of the Scots College. In 1907, he was made a privy Chamberlain. Mackintosh became rector of the College in 1913, and was made a Domestic Prelate the following year.

Mackintosh was appointed Archbishop of the Metropolitan see of Glasgow on 24 February 1922 and consecrated to the Episcopate on 21 May 1922. His principal consecrator was Cardinal Gaetano de Lai, Secretary of the Sacred Consistorial Congregation, and the principal co-consecrators were Henry Gray Graham, Auxiliary Bishop of Saint Andrews and Edinburgh and Donald Martin, Bishop of Argyll and The Isles.

According to Thomas Gerard Gallagher, by 1940, "Archbishop Mackintosh was a chronic invalid who was unable to get around his archdiocese or properly supervise its activities." He died in office on 8 December 1943, aged 67. He had been a priest for 43 years and a bishop for 21 years. He was the principal consecrator of Andrew Thomas McDonald, Archbishop of Saint Andrews and Edinburgh.

Catholic Church titles
Preceded by John Aloysius Maguire	Archbishop of Glasgow; 1922–1943	Succeeded by Donald Alphonsus Campbell
