= John Keenan (bishop) =

British bishop (born 1964)

The Right Reverend John Keenan
- Bishop of Paisley
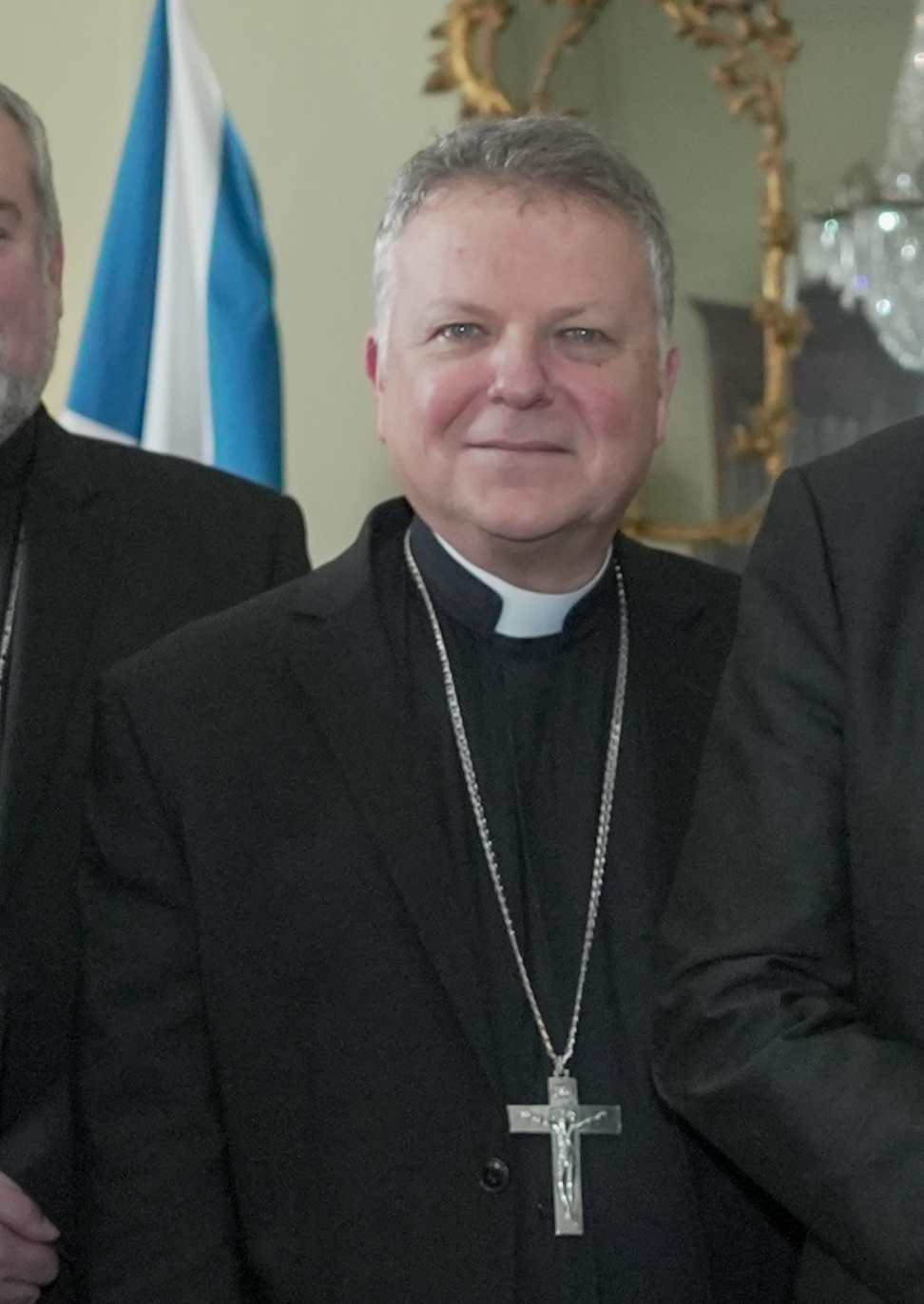
- Keenan in 2024
- Diocese: Paisley
- Appointed: 8 February 2014
- Installed: 19 March 2014
- Predecessor: Philip Tartaglia
- Other post: President of the Bishops' Conference of Scotland (2024–present)

Orders
- Ordination: 9 July 1995 by Thomas Winning
- Consecration: 19 March 2014 by Philip Tartaglia

Personal details
- Born: John Keenan; 19 December 1964 (age 61) Glasgow, Scotland
- Denomination: Roman Catholic
- Parents: Joseph & Philomena Keenan
- Education: University of Glasgow; (LLB 1988); Pontifical Scots College; Pontifical Gregorian University; (STB, PhL)
- Motto: Suscepit servum recordatus misericordiae; (He protects his servant remembering his mercy)
- Coat of arms: John Keenan's coat of arms

Styles of John Keenan
- Reference style: The Right Reverend
- Spoken style: My Lord
- Religious style: Bishop
- Posthumous style: not applicable

John Keenan (born 19 December 1964) is a Scottish Roman Catholic bishop, who has served as the bishop of the Diocese of Paisley since 2014. Before becoming a bishop he was a parish priest and school then university chaplain. Since 2024, he has also been president of the Bishops' Conference of Scotland.

== Early life and education ==
John Keenan, one of the five children of Joseph and Philomena Keenan, was born in Glasgow where he was baptised at St Joseph's Church, Cowcaddens. He was educated at St Gregory's Primary School in the Wyndford area of the city before going on to the Salesian Missionary College, Shrigley Hall near Macclesfield, Cheshire, England where he received his secondary education. In 1984 he matriculated at the University of Glasgow where he read law, graduating with a first class honours Bachelor of Laws (LLB) degree in 1988. From 1988 until 1995 he received his priestly formation at the Pontifical Scots College and the Pontifical Gregorian University in Rome, Italy, graduating with Baccalaureate in Sacred Theology (STB) and Licentiate in Philosophy (PhL) degrees.

== Priesthood ==
John Keenan was ordained to the priesthood by Cardinal Thomas Winning on 9 July 1995. Thereafter he was appointed to the parish of Christ the King in King's Park, Glasgow where he served until 2000. From 1997 until 2000 he was also chaplain to Holyrood Secondary School in Glasgow. Between 1995 and 2005 he lectured in philosophy at Scotus College, Bearsden. In 2000 he was appointed chaplain to the Catholic students and staff of the University of Glasgow, a post he held until his episcopal ordination. A few months prior to his Episcopal Ordination he was appointed by Archbishop Tartaglia to be parish priest of St Patrick's Church in the Anderston district of Glasgow and Vocations Director for the Archdiocese of Glasgow.

== Episcopate ==
On 8 February 2014, his appointment as the fifth Bishop of Paisley by Pope Francis was announced.

Keenan was consecrated bishop in St Mirin's Cathedral, Paisley on 19 March 2014, the Feast of Saint Joseph by Archbishop Philip Tartaglia of Glasgow. The principal co-consecrating bishops were Archbishop Leo Cushley of St Andrews and Edinburgh and Bishop John Mone emeritus Bishop of Paisley. Keenan has taken as his episcopal motto the words Suscepit servum recordatus misericordiae (He protects his servant remembering his mercy) inspired by the Magnificat. Having served as vice-president, he was elected president of the Catholic Bishops Conference of Scotland in 2024.

Bishop Keenan is an antiabortion activist who has gathered people to protest at the Queen Elizabeth University hospital in Glasgow, he also attended a protest at this hospital in 2025. In 2024, he spoke as an opponent to the then Abortion Services (Safe Access Zones) (Scotland) Bill at Holyrood's Health Committee, stating that the now enacted Bill would criminalise "peaceful vigils".

Bishop Keenan has been criticised for organising the first chapter of Courage International in the Paisley Diocese.

Catholic Church titles
Preceded by Philip Tartaglia	Bishop of Paisley; 2014 to present	Incumbent
