= Blessed John Duns Scotus Church, Glasgow =

Blessed John Duns Scotus Church
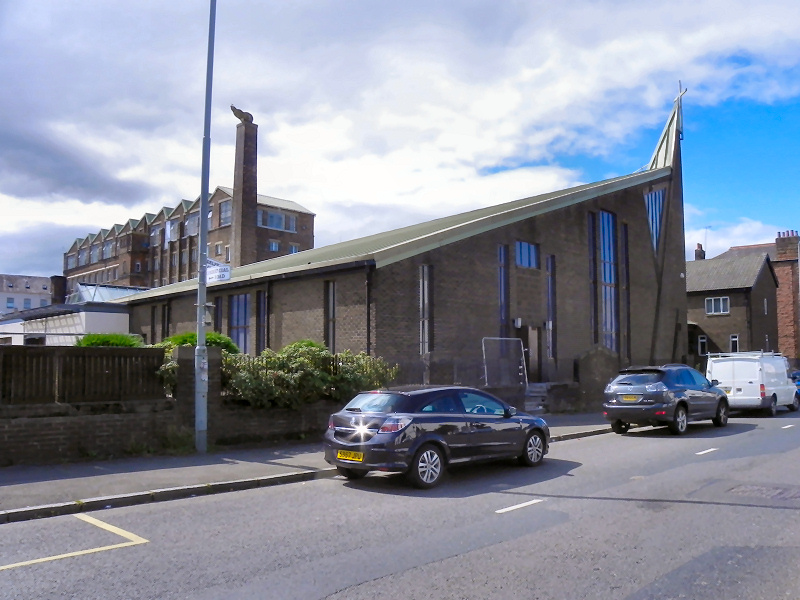
- Blessed John Duns Scotus Church
- 55.84941°N 4.24601°W
- Location: Gorbals, Glasgow
- Country: Scotland
- Denomination: Roman Catholic
- Religious institute: Order of Friars Minor
- Website: Blessed John Duns Scotus Parish, Glasgow

History
- Dedication: Blessed John Duns Scotus
- Events: Fire in 2005

Architecture
- Style: Modern
- Completed: 1975

Administration
- Archdiocese: Glasgow
- Deanery: South east
- Parish: Gorbals

Blessed John Duns Scotus Church is a Roman Catholic parish church in Gorbals, Glasgow. It was built in 1975 and is served by Franciscan priests from the Order of Friars Minor. It is located on Ballater Street, east of Laurieston Road. Since 1993, it has contained forearm of St Valentine.

== History ==
In 1868, the Franciscan Order of Friars Minor built St Francis' Church in 1868. The church was designed by Gilbert Blount and rebuilt by Pugin & Pugin, an architectural firm of the brothers Cuthbert Welby Pugin and Peter Paul Pugin from 1877 to 1878. It is a Gothic Revival church and a category A listed building. When the church was built it received a reliquary of the forearm of St Valentine from a French Catholic family.

In 1975, building work on Blessed John Duns Scotus Church was completed. It was built on the site of St Luke's Church. At the time, there were four Catholic churches in Gorbals. Eventually, after a massive construction project in the area, the other churches were closed and it became the only one remaining. In 1993, the remains of St Valentine were moved to Blessed John Duns Scotus Church. The remains were kept in a cardboard box on top of a wardrobe. In 1999, one year after the closure of St Francis' Church, the remains were rediscovered and put in the church in a box labelled "Corpus Valentini Martyris".

In 2005, there was a fire in Blessed John Duns Scotus Church. Repair work was done and on 9 September 2010, the church was reopened with a Mass celebrated by the Archbishop of Glasgow, Mario Conti.

== Parish ==
The parish is served by Franciscan friars from the Order of Friars Minor, it is the only Catholic Church in Scotland served by Franciscan priests.

The church has four Sunday Masses at 5:30pm on Saturday and at 10:00am, 12:00pm and 6:00pm on Sunday.

== See also ==
- Archdiocese of Glasgow
