= Jericho Benedictines =

The Jericho Benedictines are a Society of Apostolic Life which is one of the forms of religious congregation within the Latin branch of the Catholic Church.

== History ==
The Jericho Benedictines began in Paisley, Scotland, during the 1970s, when a group of men found themselves deeply moved by the plight of those who lived rough, and were marginalised by society because of their struggle with alcohol. Father James Ferguson, a priest of the Diocese of Paisley, gathered these men together and they chose the name 'Jericho Benedictines', a name which is highly significant. The Jericho Benedictine website states that its members have the ministry of... "welcoming, supporting, and caring for those being 'passed by on the other side' irrespective of colour, class, creed, sex, or sexual orientation".

== Life ==
Being a Society of Apostolic Life, the Jericho Benedictines are not a religious order and thus do not take the vows of poverty, chastity and obedience. However, they embrace these same charisms so that they may live simply, devote themselves totally to the ministry and be willing to go where they are most needed, even when this is inconvenient.

The Society accepts enquiries from single men between the ages of 20–50, with a minimum of two substantial visits (Monday–Friday) being required for the possibility of admission to postulancy, a period which lasts from six to nine months. After this there is a two-year novitiate in the Society's motherhouse (opened in 1990): the Monastery of Jesus at Kilbarchan, near the town of Johnstone in Renfrewshire. During this time, the member also solemnly renews his Baptismal promises. At the end of the novitiate the novice is received as an Oblate of Saint Benedict at Prinknash Abbey, Gloucestershire, with which the Jericho Benedictines have been granted an informal association. Thereafter, he returns to the motherhouse, making a temporary profession for three years, during which time both spiritual and secular development continue in order for the member to begin ministering at one of the Jericho inns. After the three-year period, he is received as a permanent member of the Community. The religious garb of the members is composed of a denim-coloured habit in the Benedictine style, with the letters JB (for Jericho Benedictines) emblazoned on the scapular.

=== Jericho Houses ===
The Society's houses are called 'Jericho Inns' in order to emphasise the element of hospitality. Since their foundation, the Jericho Benedictines have expanded their ministry beyond the care of those recovering from alcohol addiction.

To ensure that a professional presence is maintained at all times, a staff of some 60 people work alongside the Jericho Benedictines.

- Derby: (1996) Recovering drug users.
- Dundee: (1996) Recovering alcoholics in a purpose built facility with 12 flats.
- Edinburgh: (1988) Registered Residential Care Home, a half-way house, free food and clothing for the homeless.
- Girvan: (1993) Place where people who are cared for can experience a week's holiday.
- Greenock: (1980) Support for 18 men recovering from alcohol and/or drug abuse.
- Manchester: (2005) The Morning Star Hostel provides support for 15 homeless men.
- Port Glasgow: (1976) Provides supported housing for 18 men recovering from drug abuse.
- Tamil Nadu, India: (1990) This group of 25 family homes is supported by the Jericho Benedictines.
- Wolverhampton: (1985) There are two short- and long-term support units: one in Albert Road (1985) for nine women and their children, and one in Tetenhall Road (1992) for eleven women and their children in self-contained bedsits.

== Jericho Neighbours ==
Like the religious orders of the Middle Ages, the Jericho Benedictines are assisted by an army of volunteers. Apart from their regular prayers, these men and women raise money for the work of the Society as well as help out, whenever possible, at one of the Jericho Inns.
