= Charles Eyre (bishop) =

British Roman Catholic clergyman

The Most Reverend Charles Petre Eyre
- Archbishop of Glasgow
- Charles Petre Eyre, Archbishop of Glasgow
- Church: Roman Catholic Church
- Archdiocese: Glasgow
- In office: 1878–1902
- Successor: John Aloysius Maguire
- Previous posts: Vicar Apostolic of the Western District (1869–78); Titular Archbishop of Anazarbus (1868–78); Apostolic Delegate to Scotland (1868–69)

Orders
- Ordination: 19 March 1842 (Priest)
- Consecration: 3 December 1868 (Bishop) by Karl-August von Reisach

Personal details
- Born: Charles Petre Eyre; 7 November 1817 Askham Bryan, near York, England
- Died: 27 March 1902 (aged 84) Glasgow, Scotland
- Buried: (1) St Peter's Seminary, Bearsden; (2) St Andrew's Cathedral, Glasgow
- Denomination: Roman Catholic
- Parents: John Lewis Eyre and Sara Eyre (née Parker)
- Education: St Cuthbert's College, Ushaw; Venerable English College
- Motto: Neminem metue innocens
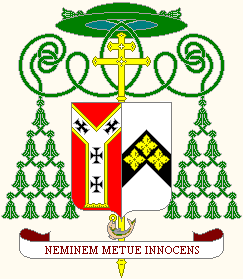
- Coat of arms

Charles Petre Eyre (1817–1902) was a Roman Catholic clergyman who was appointed the first Roman Catholic archbishop of Glasgow since the Scottish Reformation. He served as archbishop from 1878 to 1902.

== Family ==
Born at Askham Bryan Hall, Askham Bryan, near York, England, on 7 November 1817, he was the fifth of nine children of John Lewis Eyre (died 1880) and Sara Eyre, née Parker (died 1825). His father later became a director at the London and South Western Railway. His family was the recusant Eyre family of Derbyshire, a family which had retained their Roman Catholic beliefs since the English Reformation and suffered land loss as a result.

== Education and early ministry ==
On 28 March 1826, Charles was received into St Cuthbert's College, near Durham. He received the tonsure and the four minor orders (acolyte, exorcist, lector and porter) from Bishop Briggs on 17 December 1839 and he was ordained a subdeacon by the bishop on 25 May 1839. In December 1839, he entered the Venerable English College, Rome, and was ordained a priest there on 19 March 1842. He returned to England and was appointed an assistant priest at St Andrew's Catholic Church, Newcastle in 1843, before being transferred to St Mary's Church, Newcastle in 1844; becoming the senior priest there in 1847. Afterwards, he took positions at Wooler, Illness and Haggerstone between 1849 and 1856, before returning to Newcastle. He was for many years a canon of the Diocese of Hexham and Newcastle; and for some time was vicar-general of the diocese.

== Episcopal career ==
Although previously considered for other bishoprics, it was not until 29 November 1868 that he was officially nominated for a prelacy. He was appointed Titular Archbishop of Anazarbus and Apostolic Delegate for Scotland on 3 December 1868. He was consecrated at the church of Sant'Andrea della Valle, Rome on 31 January 1869. The principal consecrator was Cardinal Karl-August von Reisach, Archbishop Emeritus of Munich and Freising, and the principal co-consecrators were Henry Edward Manning, Archbishop of Westminster and Frédéric-François-Xavier Ghislain de Mérode, Titular Archbishop of Melitene.

Following the resignation of Bishop John Gray on 4 March 1869, Archbishop Eyre was appointed the Apostolic Administrator of the Western District of Scotland on 16 April 1869. He travelled to Glasgow in March 1869, charged with organising the re-establishment of Roman Catholic hierarchy in Scotland. After attending the First Vatican Council (1869–70), he returned to Scotland in a mission to build schools and to unite the Scottish catholic community, bitterly divided between Scottish and Irish Catholics. In 1874, he opened St Peter's Seminary at Bearsden (subsequently removed to Cardross under the same name).

Despite some resistance among Scottish Catholics, the Scottish hierarchy was restored by Pope Leo XIII on 15 March 1878. The Western District was divided into the Archdiocese of Glasgow, the Diocese of Argyll and the Isles and the Diocese of Galloway; with Charles Petre Eyre appointed as the first Roman Catholic archbishop of Glasgow since the Scottish Reformation.

Six years later he established a cathedral chapter. Archbishop Eyre was successful to a large extent in integrating the new establishment into Scottish society. The University of Glasgow awarded him an Honorary Doctor of Laws in 1892. He was one of the early patrons of Celtic FC, founded in 1888 with a name designed to inspire unity between Scottish and Irish Catholics in the Glasgow area.

In 1893 Eyre invited Mary Lescher and the Sisters of Notre Dame to come from Liverpool to establish a community in Glasgow. The Notre Dame Training College began teaching in January 1895. In 1897 Notre Dame High School in Glasgow was opened as a private secondary and Montessori school,

He died at his home at 6 Bowmant Gardens in Glasgow on 27 March 1902, aged 84. He was buried in his seminary at Bearsden; now the site of the new Bearsden Academy building. His body was later moved to St Andrew's Cathedral, Glasgow. Archbishop Eyre left a number of religious and historical works, including works on Scottish saints, the medieval church of Glasgow, and St Cuthbert.

== Notes ==
Catholic Church titles
| Preceded by Antoine-Pierre IX Hassun | Titular Archbishop of Anazarbus; 1868–1878 | Succeeded by Jean-Baptiste Salpointe |
| Preceded by John Gray as Vicar Apostolic of the Western District | Apostolic Administrator of the Western District; 1869–1878 | District divided into Glasgow; Argyll & The Isles, and Galloway |
| New creation | Archbishop of Glasgow; 1878–1902 | Succeeded by John Aloysius Maguire |
