= Bishops' Conference of Scotland =

Assembly of Catholic bishops

Bishops' Conference of Scotland (Catholic National Endowment Trust)
- Co-labhairt Easbaigean na h-Alba
- Abbreviation: BCOS
- Type: Religious body
- Legal status: Under charitable trust (SC016650)
- Purpose: To enable the Roman Catholic Bishops in Scotland to work together, undertaking nationwide initiatives through their Commissions and Agencies
- Headquarters: Airdrie, North Lanarkshire
- Location: Scotland
- Members: Incumbent and retired archbishops and bishops of the Catholic Church in Scotland
- President: Bishop John Keenan
- Main organ: The Episcopal Conference
- Affiliations: Council of European Bishops' Conferences, Commission of Bishops' Conferences of the European Union, Catholic Bishops' Bioethics Committee, Action of Churches Together in Scotland, Churches Together in Britain and Ireland
- Website: www.bcos.org.uk

The Bishops' Conference of Scotland (BCOS; Scottish Gaelic: Co-labhairt Easbaigean na h-Alba), under the trust of the Catholic National Endowment Trust, and based in Airdrie, North Lanarkshire, is an episcopal conference for archbishops and bishops of the Catholic Church in Scotland. The conference is primarily made up of the presiding bishops of Scotland's eight dioceses as well as bishops who have retired.

As of 2024, the president of the conference is Bishop John Keenan of the Diocese of Paisley.

== Agencies ==
The BCOS is organised into several agencies. These are: The Commission for Doctrine and Unity, The Communications and Press and Media Relations Office, The Commission for Catholic Education and Scottish Catholic Education Service, The Justice and Peace Commission, operating using the name Justice and Peace Scotland, The Heritage Commission as well as some other offices.

The Conference is also a member of several international organisations including the Council of European Bishops' Conferences and the Commission of the Bishops' Conferences of the European Community.

Before 1980, the organisation first registered with Office of the Scottish Charity Regulator and stated that its objective was to "promote, establish, develop, expand, contribute to, support and maintain facilities, projects, schemes and institutions of all kinds having a religious, educational or charitable purpose for the benefit of the community throughout Scotland; and in addition for the benefit of students for the priesthood at home and abroad including the maintenance of the following colleges, all now closed; (a) St. Mary's College, Blairs, Aberdeen, Aberdeenshire; (b) St. Peter's College, Cardross, Dumbarton; (c) St. Andrew's College, Drygrange, Melrose, Roxburghshire."

== Ecumenical relations ==
The Bishops' Conference of Scotland is a full member of Action of Churches Together in Scotland. The BCOS sends a representative to the Ecumenical Relations Committee of the Church of Scotland and is always invited to send a delegate to the General Assembly of the Church of Scotland.

== Member bishops ==
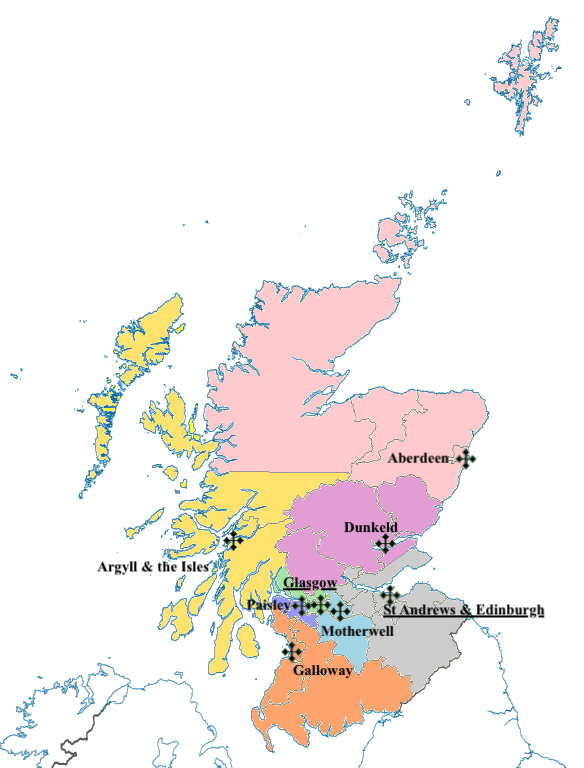
Map of dioceses in Scotland

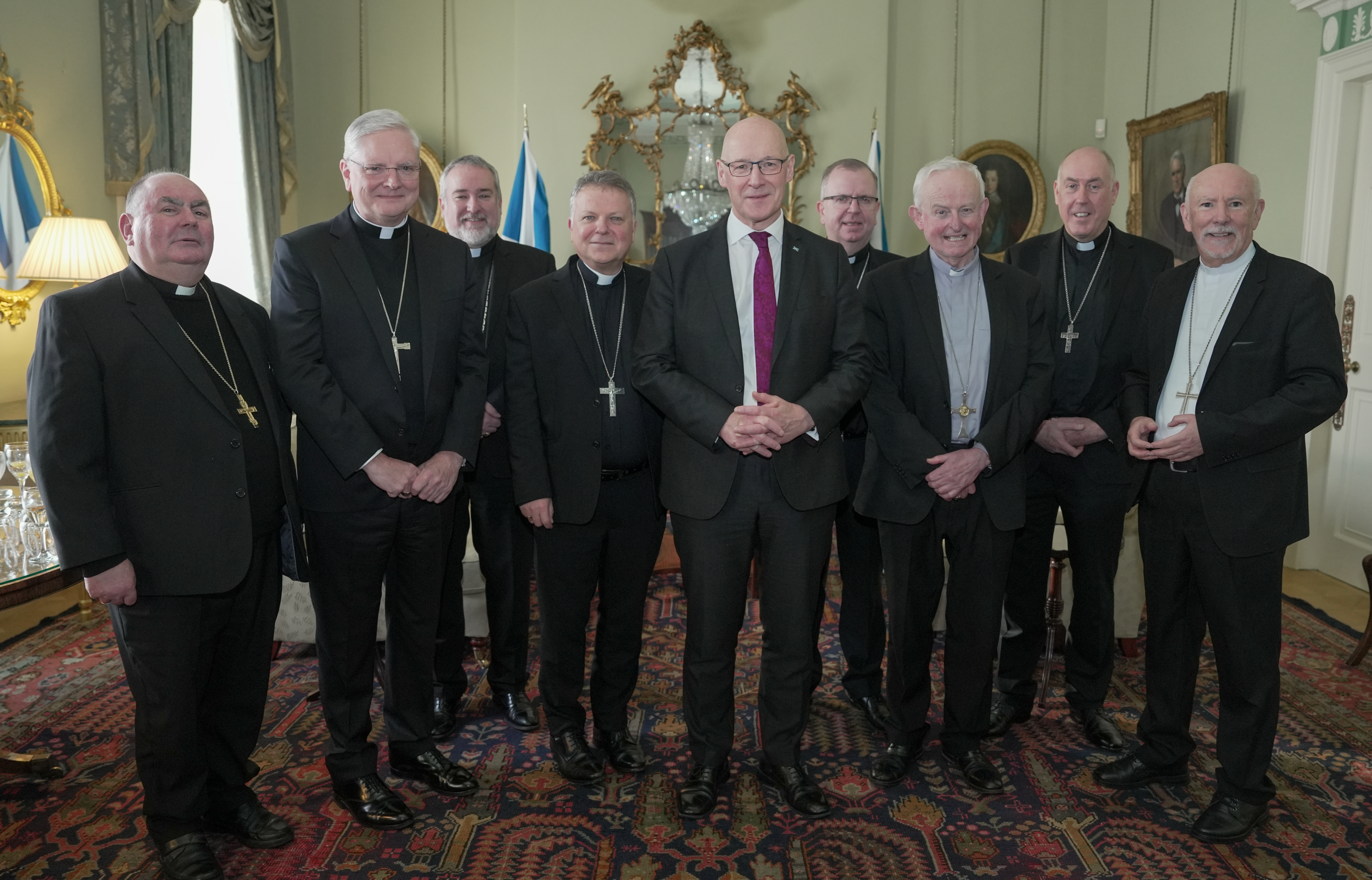
Bishops Conference meeting First Minister John Swinney in 2024

- Archdiocese of Saint Andrews and Edinburgh
  - Archbishop Leo Cushley
- Archdiocese of Glasgow
  - Archbishop William Nolan
- Diocese of Motherwell
  - Bishop Joseph Toal
- Diocese of Paisley
  - Bishop John Keenan
- Diocese of Galloway
  - Bishop Francis Dougan
- Diocese of Argyll and the Isles
  - Bishop Brian McGee
- Diocese of Aberdeen
  - Bishop Hugh Gilbert
- Diocese of Dunkeld
  - Bishop Andrew McKenzie
  - Bishop Emeritus Stephen Robson

== Leadership ==
=== Presidents ===
- Donald Campbell (1959–63)
- Gordon Gray (1963–85)
- Thomas Winning (1985–2001)
- Keith O'Brien (2002–12)
- Philip Tartaglia (2012–18)
- Hugh Gilbert (2018–24)
- John Keenan (2024–present)

== Arms ==
Coat of arms of Bishops' Conference of Scotland

Notes
Granted by the Lyon Court, 3 September 2025.
Escutcheon
Azure on a saltire Argent two bishops's croziers in saltire Gules a harrier Or all within a tressure Gules.
Supporters
Behind the shield is set a Celtic bishop's cross Or.

== See also ==
- Catholic Church in Scotland
- Religion in Scotland
- Catholic Bishops' Conference of England and Wales
- Scottish Catholic International Aid Fund
- Catholic Church Insurance Association
