= Catholic Church Insurance Association =

British Catholic insurance association

- Industry: Insurance
- Founded: 1975
- Headquarters: Aylesbury, Bucks. HP20 1BN
- Areas served: England, Scotland, Wales
- Website: www.ccia.org.uk

Catholic Church Insurance Association (CCIA) was established in 1975 by the Bishops’ Conferences of England and Wales, and Scotland, to provide insurance for Roman Catholic dioceses; religious orders; schools; care homes and other Catholic organisations. CCIA is accountable to the Bishops’ Conferences and endeavours to maintain business practices consistent with the ethos of the Church.

Through CCIA, Catholic organisations access Catholic National Mutual Ltd.(CNM), the Catholic Church's own insurance company and primary insurer within the CCIA scheme. CNM, based in Guernsey, is a mutual wholly owned by its clients with any profit used for the benefit of its members.

In 1996 CCIA and CNM received criticism from BBC Radio Scotland for their part in the Church's handling of abuse compensation claims.

Following the hearings into the Archdiocese of Birmingham at IICSA, the Independent Inquiry into Child Sexual Abuse, Stephen Parsons wrote on an influential blog

The Catholic Church uses a company based in Guernsey which apparently is so secretive that it does not have a web-site. This combination of secrecy, traditional Catholic reticence and the financial advantages of being based in a tax haven raises eye-brows. I can go no farther than that. All I can say is that if we want to know who may be calling the shots in the shabbily ineffective conduct of child protection among Catholics in Birmingham over the past fifty years, we might start, not with the Vatican or even the beleaguered successive Archbishops of Birmingham, but with a secretive insurance group based in Guernsey.
