= Henry Grey Graham =

Scottish Catholic clergyman and author

The Right Reverend Henry Grey Graham
- Auxiliary Bishop Emeritus of St Andrews and Edinburgh
- Appointed: 30 August 1917
- Term ended: 31 March 1930
- Other post: Titular Bishop of Tipasa in Numidia (1917–30)

Orders
- Ordination: 22 December 1906 by Pietro Respighi
- Consecration: 16 November 1917 by John Aloysius Maguire

Personal details
- Born: 8 March 1874 Maxton, Roxburghshire, Scotland
- Died: 5 December 1959 (aged 85) Crosshill, Glasgow, Scotland
- Buried: Dalbeth Cemetery, Glasgow
- Denomination: Roman Catholic (previously Church of Scotland)
- Profession: Clergyman and author
- Education: University of St Andrews; Pontifical Scots College, Rome
- Motto: Gustate et videte

Henry Grey Graham (8 March 1874 – 5 December 1959) was a Scottish Catholic clergyman and author.

== Biography ==
He was born at the manse in Maxton, Roxburghshire, his father being the local Church of Scotland minister. He attended the University of St Andrews where he graduated Master of Arts in 1893 and Bachelor of Divinity in 1896, and also lectured at the university in Hebrew and Oriental Studies (1896–97). He was licensed as a Minister in 1897 and elected parish minister of Avondale, Lanarkshire in 1901. He was received into the Catholic Church in 1903 at Fort Augustus Abbey, and entered the Scots College Rome to train for the priesthood. He was ordained priest on 22 December 1906 by Cardinal Respighi at the Lateran Basilica in Rome and returned to Scotland in July 1907. He served as an assistant firstly at Larkhall and then Motherwell, and then was given charge of St Mary's Longriggend.

He was appointed Auxiliary Bishop of St Andrews and Edinburgh and Titular Bishop of Tipasa in Numidia on 30 August 1917 to assist Archbishop James Smith. He was consecrated to the Episcopate on 16 November 1917 at St Mary's Cathedral, Edinburgh. The principal consecrator was Archbishop John Maguire of Glasgow and the principal co-consecrators were Bishop James McCarthy of Galloway and Bishop John Toner of Dunkeld. In 1930, he returned to Glasgow as parish priest of Holy Cross, Crosshill. He continued to undertake episcopal functions such as assisting with the administering of Holy orders and confirmation in the Archdiocese. He died on 5 December 1959.

== Writings ==
- Where We Got the Bible: Our Debt to the Catholic Church (1911)
- Saint Margaret Queen of Scotland (1911)
- What Faith Really Means (1914)
- Hindrances to Conversion
- From the Kirk to the Catholic Church
