= John Mone =

The Right Reverend John Aloysius Mone
- Bishop of Paisley
- Church: Roman Catholic
- Diocese: Paisley
- Appointed: 8 March 1988
- Term ended: 7 October 2004
- Predecessor: Stephen McGill
- Successor: Philip Tartaglia
- Previous posts: Auxiliary Bishop of Glasgow and Titular Bishop of Abercornia (1984–88)

Orders
- Ordination: 12 June 1952
- Consecration: 14 May 1984 by Thomas Winning

Personal details
- Born: 22 June 1929 Crosshill, Glasgow, Scotland
- Died: 14 October 2016 (aged 87) Greenock, Scotland
- Motto: To lead in love

John Aloysius Mone (22 June 1929 – 14 October 2016) was the third Roman Catholic Bishop of Paisley.

== Early life ==
John Mone was fourth of the six children of Arthur Mone and Elizabeth Dunn. Born in Glasgow, he was raised in the Crosshill district.

== Priesthood ==
After studies with the Sulpicians at Issy-les-Moulineaux, France and at the rue du Regard and the Institut Catholique in Paris he was ordained to the priesthood on 12 June 1952. Thereafter he served as curate for twenty two years at St Ninian's in Knightswood and for five years at Our Lady and St George in Penilee. In 1979 he was made parish priest of St Joseph's Tollcross.

== Episcopate ==
On 24 April 1984 he was created auxiliary bishop of Glasgow and titular Bishop of Abercornia by Pope John Paul II and was consecrated by Thomas Winning, Archbishop of Glasgow, at Holy Cross Church in Glasgow, the church where he had been baptised. He was translated to the see of Paisley on 8 March 1988 to succeed Stephen McGill and was installed as its bishop at St Mirin's Cathedral in Paisley on 14 May 1988. Mone served as ordinary of the diocese until his retirement on 7 October 2004.

During his episcopate and in retirement he frequently criticised the Dungavel Detention Centre, a holding unit for asylum seekers.

His motto was To Lead in Love.

Bishop Mone died at the Holy Rosary Home in Greenock on 14 October 2016.

Catholic Church titles
Preceded by Stephen McGill	Bishop of Paisley; 1988–2004	Succeeded by Philip Tartaglia
