= Stephen McGill =

Catholic bishop (1912–2005)

The Right Reverend Stephen McGill
- Bishop Emeritus of Paisley
- Church: Roman Catholic Church
- Diocese: Paisley
- Appointed: 25 July 1968
- Term ended: 8 March 1988
- Predecessor: James Black
- Successor: John Mone
- Previous post: Bishop of Argyll and the Isles (1960–68)

Orders
- Ordination: 29 June 1936 by Henry Grey Graham
- Consecration: 22 June 1960 by Gerald O'Hara

Personal details
- Born: 4 January 1912 Crosshill, Glasgow
- Died: 9 November 2005 (aged 93) Cardonald, Glasgow
- Motto: Per semitas tuas

The Right Reverend Stephen McGill PSS (4 January 1912 – 9 November 2005) was the sixth Bishop of Argyll and the Isles and second Bishop of Paisley.

== Early life ==
Stephen McGill was born on 4 January 1912 to Peter McGill and Charlotte Connolly in Glasgow, Scotland where he was educated at Holy Cross primary school and St Aloysius' College before entering the national junior seminary at St Mary's College, Blairs, Aberdeen.

== Priesthood ==
In October 1931 he entered Le Grand Séminaire at Coutances in France and was ordained priest of the Archdiocese of Glasgow at St Andrew's Cathedral, Glasgow by Bishop Henry Grey Graham on 29 June 1936. Following his ordination he returned to France where he entered the novitiate of the Sulpicians at Issy-les-Moulineaux, Paris and was incardinated priest of St Sulpice (PSS) in July of the following year. Further studies were undertaken at the Institut Catholique in Paris where he gained his licentiate in sacred theology (STL) in 1939.

Thereafter he was appointed to the staff of Le Grand Séminaire at Bordeaux in October 1939 and transferred to Le Grand Séminaire at Aix-en-Provence in January 1940. At this point the Second World War was under way in Europe so, following the fall of France to the Germans in June 1940, Father McGill, as a British citizen, had to make his escape via Marseille and Spain to avoid internment as an enemy alien.

On his return to Scotland he was appointed to the staff of St Mary's in Blairs where he remained as spiritual director until he was appointed rector in 1951. In 1952 he was made an honorary canon of the Glasgow cathedral chapter.

== Episcopate ==
When Bishop Kenneth Grant of Argyll and the Isles died suddenly in 1959 Canon McGill was appointed to succeed him by Pope John XXIII and was consecrated bishop in St Columba's Cathedral, Oban on 22 June 1960. During his time in Argyll and the Isles Bishop McGill attended sessions of the Second Vatican Council (1962 - 1965) and oversaw translation of the liturgy into Gaelic.

On the death of Bishop James Black in March 1968 Bishop McGill was translated by Pope Paul VI to the see of Paisley as his successor. There he remained until his retirement in March 1988.

== Final years ==
In retirement Stephen McGill maintained his interest in priestly formation and was a prolific letter writer. He died peacefully in his ninety fourth year on 9 November 2005 at Nazareth House, Cardonald, Glasgow. His motto was, in Latin, Per Tuas Semitas ("By Your Ways") taken from the hymn 'Panis angelicus' by St Thomas Aquinas.

== Sources ==
- The Catholic Directory for Scotland 2006 (Glasgow, 2006)

Catholic Church titles
Preceded by Kenneth Grant	Bishop of Argyll and the Isles; 1960–1968	Succeeded by Colin Aloysius MacPherson
Preceded by James Black	Bishop of Paisley; 1968–1988	Succeeded by John Aloysius Mone
