= James Black (bishop) =

Roman Catholic Bishop of Paisley in Scotland

The Right Reverend James Black
- Bishop of Paisley
- Church: Roman Catholic Church
- Diocese: Paisley
- Appointed: 28 February 1948
- Term ended: 29 March 1968
- Successor: Stephen McGill

Orders
- Ordination: 27 June 1920 by James McCarthy
- Consecration: 14 April 1948 by Donald Campbell

Personal details
- Born: 25 June 1894 Calton, Glasgow, Scotland
- Died: 29 March 1968 (aged 73) Kilmacolm, Renfrewshire, Scotland
- Motto: Prodesse magis quam praeesse (To follow is greater than to lead)

James Black (25 June 1894 – 29 March 1968) was the first Roman Catholic Bishop of Paisley in Scotland.

== Early life ==
Black spent the first years of his life in the Calton district of Glasgow before his family moved to Tollcross where he received his primary education at St Joseph's school. His secondary education was at St Aloysius' College, an establishment administered by the Jesuits at Garnethill in the city centre, where he won the Stewart Bursary in the 1912 University of Glasgow bursary competition and matriculated in the Faculty of Arts in October of that year. However, the following year he left university to study for the priesthood at St Peter's College, Bearsden.

== Military service ==
In April 1917, along with several of his fellow students, he left the seminary to enlist in the Royal Munster Fusiliers at Tralee in County Kerry, Ireland. In February 1918 he was deployed to France and saw action at the Second Battle of the Somme. On 31 March 1918, he was severely wounded by machine gun fire and it was feared that he might lose a leg. However he recovered sufficiently from his wounds and was discharged from the army on medical grounds in December 1918.

== Priesthood ==
In January 1919 he resumed his studies at St Peter's and was subsequently ordained to the priesthood at St Andrew's Cathedral, Glasgow by Bishop James McCarthy of Galloway on 27 June 1920. James Black's first appointment was to the church of St Patrick in Coatbridge, Lanarkshire where he remained until October 1931 when he was transferred to St Peter's in Partick.

In January 1939 he was made parish priest of Our Lady and St John's in Blackwood, Lanarkshire. Thereafter, in June 1941, he was removed to St Charles Borromeo parish in Paisley where his tenure was a brief six months before being appointed as chaplain to Notre Dame College for the training of teachers in Glasgow where, in addition to his pastoral duties, he also taught history and ethics. On 11 May 1947, following the death of Monsignor Daly, Father Black was made Vicar General of the Archdiocese of Glasgow.

== Episcopate ==
Upon the establishment of the new diocese of Paisley, Monsignor James Black was appointed as its first bishop by Pope Pius XII on 28 February 1948 and was consecrated by Archbishop Donald Campbell in St Mirin's Cathedral on 14 April of the same year.

During his twenty-year episcopate Bishop Black created eleven parishes and oversaw the building of nine new churches. In this same era three religious congregations came to the diocese and the National Junior Seminary was founded at St Vincent's in Langbank in 1961. He attended all the plenary sessions of the Second Vatican Council (1962–65) and began implementation of the conciliar and post-conciliar decrees. The last few years of Bishop Black's episcopate were dogged by ill health and, in March 1968, after some months of confinement, he died in office at age 73 in Kilmacolm.

Black's motto was in Latin Promesse Magis Quam Praeesse (To follow is greater than to lead).

== Sources ==
- "Bishop James Black". Catholic-Hierarchy.org. David M. Cheney.
- The Catholic Directory for Scotland 1969 (Glasgow, 1969)
- Darragh, James The Catholic Hierarchy of Scotland (Glasgow, 1986)

Catholic Church titles
New title	Bishop of Paisley; 1948–1968	Succeeded by Stephen McGill
