= Bohuntine =

Coordinates: 56.90°N 04.82°W

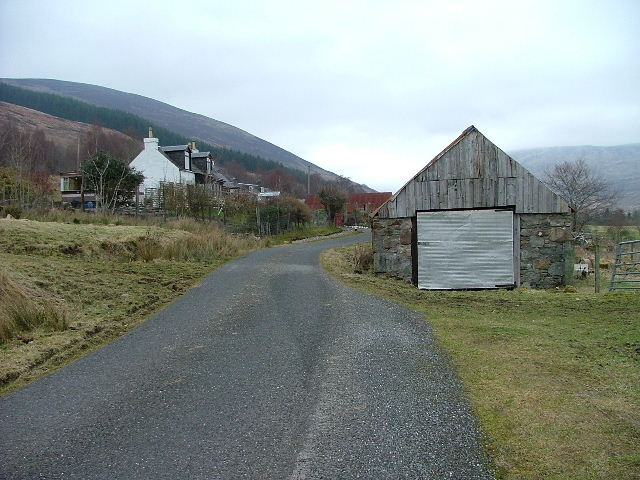

- Location within the Lochaber area
- OS grid reference: NN2883
- Council area: Highland
- Country: Scotland
- Sovereign state: United Kingdom
- Police: Scotland
- Fire: Scottish
- Ambulance: Scottish

Bohuntine (Scottish Gaelic: Both Fhionndain) is a settlement located close to Roybridge, in Lochaber, within the Scottish Highlands, and is in the Highland Council area.

== History ==
The first tacksman of Bohuntine, Iain Dubh MacDhòmhnaill, was born illegitimately during the early 16th-century to Ranald, the 7th Chief of Clan MacDonald of Keppoch, and a weaver woman from Clan Cameron whose name does not survive. Her father, however, was Lachuinn Mòr Mac a' Bhàird ("Big Lachuinn, son of the Poet").

For this reason, Iain Dubh's descendants were referred to as Sliochd an Taighe ("The Family of the Household") and as Sliochd na Ban-fhigich ("The Family of the Weaver-Woman").

After they fought for Prince Charles Edward Stuart during the Jacobite rising of 1745, the two sons of the Tacksman were sold into indentured servitude in the Carolinas as punishment for having taken part in the rebellion.

Through shared descent from the tacksmen of Bohuntine, Bards Fr. Allan MacDonald of Eriskay and Ailean a' Ridse MacDhòmhnaill of Nova Scotia, who are both very important figures in Scottish Gaelic literature, were very near relatives. In commenting upon their shared lineage, literary historian Effie Rankin has argued that Fr. Allan MacDonald and Ailean a' Ridse MacDhòmhnaill, "may rightfully be regarded as the foremost Keppoch bards of the nineteenth century."

== In literature ==
In his poem Sliochd an Taighe, which was composed in Canadian Gaelic upon the Ridge of Mabou, Ailean a' Ridse MacDhòmhnaill praised the warrior history of his Bohuntine ancestors. He related the courage and leadership shown upon the battlefield by Iain Dubh MacDhòmhnaill, by his descendants against Clan MacIntosh at the Battle of Mulroy, and as supporters of the House of Stuart during the English Civil War and the Jacobite risings. He ended by arguing that the House of Hanover was indebted to the Scottish Gaels for their subsequent victories in the Seven Years' War and the Napoleonic Wars, as it is always the manner of Keppoch to be accustomed to winning victory upon the battlefield.
