= Bishop of Paisley =

- Bishopric

catholic
- Incumbent: John Keenan

Location
- Ecclesiastical province: Province of Glasgow

Information
- First holder: James Black
- Established: 25 May 1947
- Diocese: Diocese of Paisley
- Cathedral: St Mirin's Cathedral, Paisley

The Bishop of Paisley is the Ordinary of the Diocese of Paisley in the Province of Glasgow, Scotland.

The diocese covers an area of 580 km^{2} (220 sq mi) and is the smallest by area in Scotland. The see is in the town of Paisley where the bishop's seat is located at St Mirin's Cathedral.

The diocese was erected on 25 May 1947 from the Archdiocese of Glasgow. The first bishop of the new diocese was James Black who, prior to his appointment by Pope Pius XII, had been Vicar General of the Glasgow archdiocese. Upon the death of Black in March 1968 Stephen McGill was translated by Pope Paul VI from the see of Argyll and the Isles and remained in Paisley until his retirement in March 1988 whereupon he was succeeded by John Mone an auxiliary bishop of Glasgow and an appointee of Pope John Paul II.

Following the retirement of Mone, Philip Tartaglia was appointed by Pope Benedict XVI to be the new bishop on 13 September 2005 and was consecrated at St Mirin's Cathedral on 20 November 2005. He was named Metropolitan Archbishop of Glasgow by Pope Benedict XVI on 24 July 2012.

On 8 February 2014 Pope Francis named John Keenan, the Catholic chaplain to the University of Glasgow, as fifth Bishop of Paisley. His episcopal ordination took place on Wednesday 19 March 2014, the Feast of Saint Joseph.

== List of bishops of Paisley ==
Bishops of Paisley
From	Until	Incumbent	Notes
1948	1968	James Black	Appointed bishop of Paisley on 28 February 1948 and consecrated on 14 April 1948. Died in office on 29 March 1968.
1968	1988	Stephen McGill PSS	Previously Bishop of Argyll and the Isles (1960–1968). Appointed bishop of Paisley on 25 July 1968. Retired on 8 March 1988 and died on 9 November 2005.
1988	2004	John Mone	Formerly an auxiliary bishop of Glasgow (1984–1988). Appointed bishop of Paisley on 8 March 1988. Retired on 7 October 2004 and died on 14 October 2016.
2005	2012	Philip Tartaglia	Appointed bishop of Paisley on 13 September 2005 and consecrated on 20 November 2005. Appointed Metropolitan Archbishop of Glasgow on 24 July 2012.
2014	Present	John Keenan	Appointed bishop of Paisley on 8 February 2014 and consecrated on 19 March 2014.

== See also ==
- Roman Catholicism in Scotland
