= Donald Campbell (bishop) =

Scottish prelate (1894–1963)

The Most Reverend Donald Alphonsus Campbell
- Archbishop of Glasgow
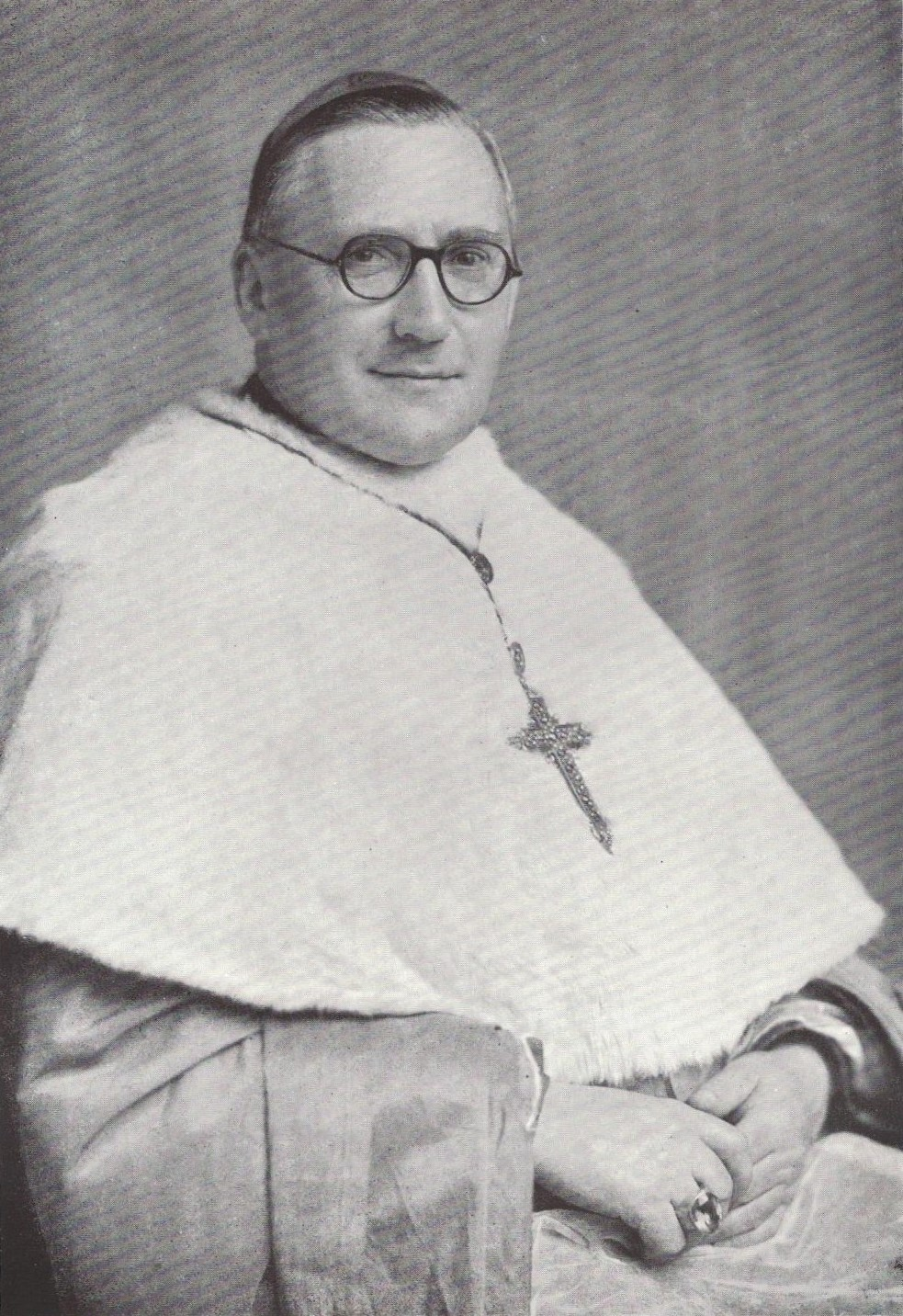
- Church: Roman Catholic
- Archdiocese: Glasgow
- Appointed: 6 January 1945
- Term ended: 22 July 1963
- Predecessor: Donald Mackintosh
- Successor: James Scanlan
- Previous post: Bishop of Argyll and The Isles (1939–1945)

Orders
- Ordination: 3 April 1920
- Consecration: 14 December 1939 by Andrew McDonald

Personal details
- Born: 8 December 1894 Bohuntine, Scotland
- Died: 22 July 1963 (aged 68) Lourdes, France
- Education: Blairs College; Pontifical Scots College
- Motto: In timore Deo deservire
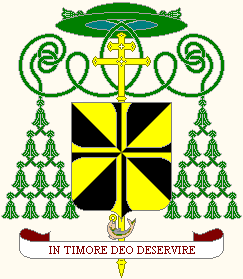
- Coat of arms: Donald Alphonsus Campbell's coat of arms

Donald Alphonsus Campbell (8 December 1894 – 22 July 1963) was a Scottish prelate who served as the Roman Catholic Archbishop of Glasgow from 1945 to 1963.

== Life ==
=== Early life ===
Born in Bohuntine, Glen Roy, Inverness-shire on 8 December 1894, he was educated at the local school and entered Blairs College in 1908 to train for the priesthood. He continued to the Scots College, Rome and was ordained to the priesthood on 3 April 1920.

=== Priesthood ===
Campbell's first assignment was at St Andrew's Cathedral, Glasgow. From there he went to St Mary's Cathedral, Aberdeen, and later to the Diocese of Argyll and the Isles, where he served as assistant at Rothesay and Roybridge before being appointed parish priest at Castlebay on Barra, and later at Daliburgh on South Uist.

=== Episcopate ===
Campbell was appointed Bishop of the Diocese of Argyll and the Isles by the Holy See on 5 October 1939, succeeding a kinsman, Bishop Donald Martin. He was consecrated to the episcopate on 14 December 1939. The principal consecrator was Archbishop Andrew Thomas McDonald of Saint Andrews and Edinburgh, and the principal co-consecrators were Bishop George Henry Bennett of Aberdeen and Bishop William Henry Mellon of Galloway.

Six years later, he was translated to the Metropolitan see of Glasgow as archbishop on 6 January 1945. St. Peter's College, the diocesan seminary burned down in 1946; Campbell later participated in the ground-breaking for its successor, St Peter's Seminary, Cardross. He also participated in laying the foundation stone for the new Scots College in Rome.

The suffragan sees of Motherwell and Paisley were created from Glasgow in 1948, thus making the archdiocese a metropolitan see.

In 1952, Archbishop Campbell described Marshal Tito as a "modern Nero".he was a member of the Central Preparatory Commission in anticipation of the Second Vatican Council. He attended the first session of the Council in 1962.

Campbell died at the age of 68 on 22 July 1963, at while leading the annual diocesan pilgrimage to Lourdes. His body was returned to Scotland, lying in state in St Andrew's Cathedral where an estimated 14,000 people filed past the coffin to pay their respects.

Catholic Church titles
Preceded by Donald Martin	Bishop of Argyll and the Isles; 1939–1945	Succeeded by Kenneth Grant
Preceded by Donald Mackintosh	Archbishop of Glasgow; 1945–1963	Succeeded by James Donald Scanlan
