= Kenneth Grant (bishop) =

Scottish Roman Catholic clergyman

The Right Reverend Kenneth Grant
- Bishop of Argyll and the Isles
- Church: Roman Catholic Church
- Diocese: Argyll and the Isles
- Appointed: 15 December 1945
- Term ended: 7 September 1959
- Predecessor: Donald Alphonsus Campbell
- Successor: Stephen McGill

Orders
- Ordination: 24 April 1927
- Consecration: 27 February 1946 by Donald Alphonsus Campbell

Personal details
- Born: 18 March 1900 Fort William, Inverness-shire, Scotland
- Died: 7 September 1959 (aged 59) Glasgow, Lanarkshire, Scotland
- Motto: Christi coronam cernite

Kenneth Grant (18 March 1900 – 7 September 1959) was a Scottish Roman Catholic clergyman who served as the Bishop of Argyll and the Isles from 1945 to 1959.

== Biography ==
Born in Fort William, Scotland on 18 March 1900, he was educated at and St Peter's College, Bearsden. He was ordained to the priesthood for the Archdiocese of Glasgow on 24 April 1927, however served as curate in Benbecula (1927–28). He returned to Glasgow and was curate of St Mary Immaculate, Pollokshaws (1928–39). He served as a forces chaplain (1939–45) and then curate of St Joseph's, Clarkston (1945–46).

He was appointed the Bishop of the Diocese of Argyll and the Isles by the Holy See on 15 December 1945, and consecrated to the Episcopate on 27 February 1946. The principal consecrator was Archbishop Donald Alphonsus Campbell of Glasgow, and the principal co-consecrators were Bishop George Henry Bennett of Aberdeen and Bishop William Henry Mellon of Galloway.

He died in office on 7 September 1959, aged 59.

Catholic Church titles
Preceded by Donald Alphonsus Campbell	Bishop of Argyll and the Isles; 1945–1959	Succeeded by Stephen McGill
