= St Mirin's Cathedral =

Coordinates: 55.848°N 4.417°W

- The Cathedral Church of Saint Mirin in Paisley
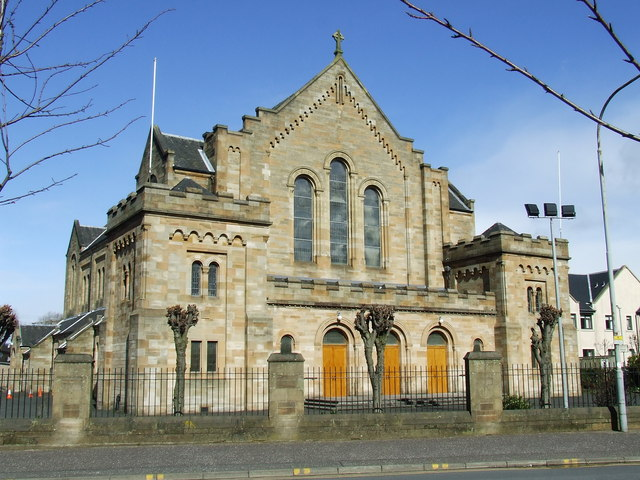

- Shown within Renfrewshire
- Location: Paisley, Renfrewshire
- Country: Scotland
- Denomination: Roman Catholic

Architecture
- Style: neo-Romanesque
- Years built: 1931

Administration
- Province: Glasgow
- Diocese: Paisley

Clergy
- Bishop: John Keenan
- Dean: Monsignor Joseph Burke

The Cathedral Church of Saint Mirin in Paisley, dedicated to Saint Mirin the patron saint of Paisley, is the mother church of the Catholic Diocese of Paisley and is the seat of the Bishop of Paisley.

== History ==
The former parish church of St Mirin, it is situated in Incle Street, Paisley, at the junction with Glasgow Road and was completed in 1931 close to the site of the original church of the same name which dated from 1808. The original building was the first stone-built Roman Catholic church in post-Reformation Scotland. It was formally opened at a solemn mass in 1932 which was attended by the archbishops of Glasgow and Edinburgh and the bishop of Galloway along with various members of local clergy and parishioners. Also in attendance were the provost of Paisley Councillor Gault, local magistrates and councillors who were joined by at least two thousand onlookers who lined the streets outside the newly opened church. Irish nationalist politician Joe Devlin MP also attended the solemn mass. The present building was raised to cathedral status in 1948 following the erection of the diocese in 1947.

== Fabric ==
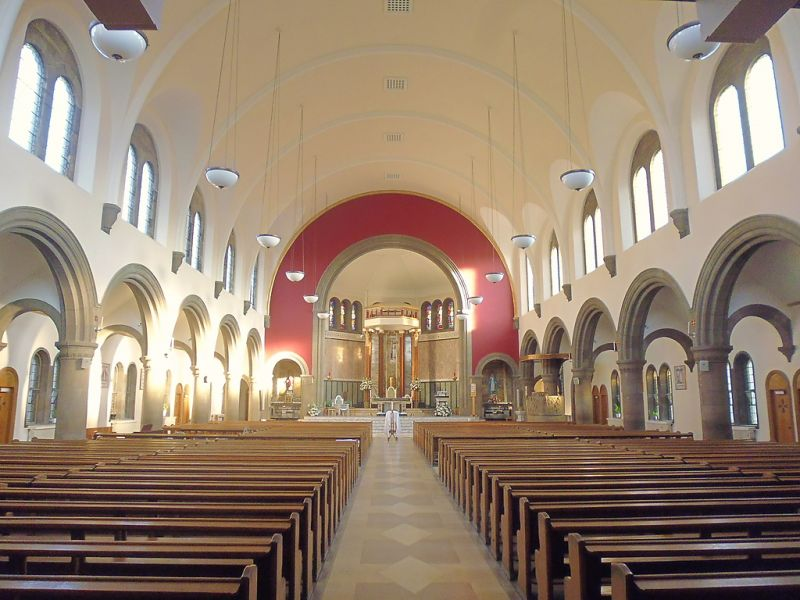
Interior

The building is neo-Romanesque in style with a plain sandstone exterior and an airy arched interior: its architect was Thomas Baird. The chancel is principally of Italian marble. Excluding the chancel, the cathedral is 109 feet (33 metres) in length and has a breadth of 48.5 feet (14.8 metres). The chancel itself is 29.5 feet (9.0 metres) in width by 23.25 feet (7.09 metres) in depth and is semi-octagonal in form.

Of particular interest is the pulpit by Gillespie, Kidd and Coia, with a representation of the Sermon on the Mount sculpted in relief from blond sandstone bearing the following inscriptions in Latin from the Letter of Saint James: In mansuetudine suscipite insitum verbum quod potest salvare animas vestras (Receive humbly the word that has been placed within you which can save your souls) and Estote autem factores verbi et non auditores (Be doers of the word and not hearers only).

Also of note are the Art Deco Stations of the Cross designed by Kenneth King of Dublin which are painted on ceramic tiles.

In the apse four colourful tripartite stained glass windows depict twelve angels each of whom bears a symbol drawn from the Bible. Below them is a Latin inscription alluding to the Eucharist: Panis Angelicus Fit Panis Hominum Dat Panis Coelicus Figuris Terminum.

In the former baptistry to the north side of the vestibule is a stained-glass window depicting Jesus with children by Charles Baillie, while a shrine to St John Ogilvie by Norman Galbraith can be found on the south side.

The church, which is the largest in the diocese, can accommodate around 1300 worshippers.

Opposite the cathedral, at the junction of Incle Street with Gauze Street and Glasgow Road, stands a bronze statue of St Mirin by Norman Galbraith which was completed in 2007. Modifications to the main entrance, porch and frontage of the cathedral were completed in 2010.

== Clergy ==
Customarily a cathedral, as the seat of the bishop, has him as its nominal parish priest. However, to oversee the running of the cathedral and its parish there is an administrator, currently Monsignor Joseph Burke.

== Diamond Jubilee ==
On 15 September 2008, the feast day of its patron saint, the Diocese of Paisley celebrated its Diamond Jubilee. To mark the occasion a mass concelebrated by the Apostolic Nuncio to the Court of St. James's Faustino Sainz Muñoz, the Archbishop of St Andrews and Edinburgh Cardinal Keith O'Brien, the Archbishop of Glasgow Mario Conti, the Bishop of Motherwell Joseph Devine, the Bishop of Aberdeen Peter Moran, the Bishop of Galloway John Cunningham, the Emeritus Bishop of Paisley John Mone, the Bishop of Paisley Philip Tartaglia and many priests of the diocese took place in the cathedral. Present at the Mass were a large number of civic dignitaries and representatives of other churches in Paisley. Representing Her Majesty Queen Elizabeth II were the Lord Lieutenant of Renfrewshire Guy Clark, and his deputy, James Wardrop.

== See also ==
- List of listed buildings in Paisley, Renfrewshire
