= Philip Tartaglia =

Catholic archbishop of Glasgow (1951–2021)

The Most Reverend Philip Tartaglia
- Archbishop of Glasgow
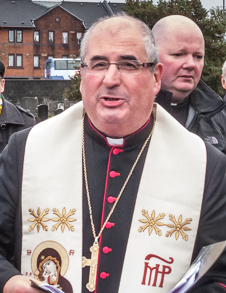
- Tartaglia in 2013
- Church: Catholic Church
- Diocese: Glasgow
- Appointed: 24 July 2012
- Installed: 8 September 2012
- Term ended: 13 January 2021
- Predecessor: Mario Conti
- Successor: William Nolan
- Previous posts: Rector of the Pontifical Scots College (2004–2005); Bishop of Paisley (2005–2012); President of the Bishops' Conference of Scotland (2012–2018)

Orders
- Ordination: 30 June 1975 by Thomas Winning
- Consecration: 20 November 2005 by Mario Conti

Personal details
- Born: Filippo Tartaglia; 11 January 1951 Glasgow, Scotland
- Died: 13 January 2021 (aged 70) Glasgow, Scotland
- Denomination: Catholic
- Parents: Guido and Annita Tartaglia
- Motto: Da robur, fer auxilium "Thine aid supply, thy strength bestow"

Styles of Philip Tartaglia
- Reference style: The Most Reverend
- Spoken style: Your Grace
- Religious style: Archbishop

Filippo "Philip" Tartaglia (11 January 1951 – 13 January 2021) was a Scottish prelate who served as a bishop of the Catholic Church. He served as Metropolitan Archbishop of Glasgow from 2012 until 2021. He previously served as Bishop of Paisley. Prior to his appointment as bishop, he was a professor at seminaries, as well as an assistant pastor and parish priest in the Archdiocese of Glasgow.

He was the eighth Archbishop of Glasgow since the re-establishment of the hierarchy in 1878 following the Reformation. He was described as a conservative in religious and moral issues.

== Early life ==
Tartaglia was born in Glasgow on 11 January 1951. He was the eldest son of Guido Tartaglia and Annita née Bertolacci, and had three brothers and five sisters. One of his brothers also served as a priest in Glasgow. He was of Italian descent. After completing his primary schooling at St Thomas', Riddrie, he began his secondary education at St. Mungo's Academy, Glasgow. He attended minor seminary at St Vincent's College, Langbank and, later, St Mary's College, Blairs, near Aberdeen. His ecclesiastical studies were completed at the Pontifical Scots College, and the Pontifical Gregorian University in Rome. On 30 June 1975, Tartaglia was ordained to the Catholic priesthood at the Church of Our Lady of Good Counsel in Dennistoun by Thomas Winning, the Archbishop of Glasgow at the time.

== Presbyteral ministry ==
Tartaglia subsequently returned to Rome where he completed his ordinary course of studies in 1976, before beginning research for his doctorate in Sacred Theology. He was appointed dean of studies at the Scots College in Rome in 1978, and was also acting vice-rector at that time. After obtaining his STD degree two years later, on the Council of Trent's teaching on the Eucharist, he received his first pastoral assignment as assistant priest at Our Lady of Lourdes, Cardonald. He concurrently held the position of extramural lecturer at St. Peter's College, Newlands, Glasgow.

A year later, Tartaglia was appointed lecturer at St. Peter's College, becoming director of studies in 1983. When Chesters College, Bearsden, opened in 1985 he was made vice-rector. In 1987 he was appointed rector.

Tartaglia served as rector until 1993 when he was sent to St. Patrick's, Dumbarton, as assistant priest before being appointed parish priest of St Mary's, Duntocher in 1995. In 2004 the Bishops' Conference of Scotland asked him to return to seminary as rector of the Pontifical Scots College, Rome.

== Episcopal ministry ==
Tartaglia was appointed the fourth Bishop of Paisley on 13 September 2005. The see had been vacant since October of the previous year, when John Mone retired after sixteen years. He was consecrated bishop on 20 November 2005, at St Mirin's Cathedral in Paisley. Mario Conti, the Archbishop of Glasgow, served as the principal consecrator, with Raymond Leo Burke and Mone being co-consecrators.

Tartaglia attacked UK law relating to the family in 2006. He outlined his opinion that the Family Law Act 1996 – which made divorce quicker and easier – civil partnership legislation giving homosexual relationships legal status, and the Gender Recognition Act – which allowed people to change their gender designation – would undermine the family in society. He stated, "Unfortunately, in our times, the minds of many have been so darkened by hubris and by the selfish pursuit of their own gratification that they have lost sight of the natural law which God has written into his creation...". He reiterated this stance in 2010, when he wrote to David Cameron to insist that "the Catholic Church will not register civil partnerships nor celebrate same-sex unions: not now, not in the future, not ever, no matter what legislation or regulations your government enacts or endorses." He also criticised the UK government's decision to upgrade its nuclear weapons capability.

As president of the National Communications Commission of the Bishops' Conference of Scotland, Tartaglia wrote to every parish in Scotland in May 2008, decrying the media for pushing a "secular and humanistic agenda". Arguing his belief that "over two-thirds" of Scots are actually Christians, and that the proportion of people who work in the media does not reflect this, he wrote that this led to a "fundamental disconnection between the provider and the consumer".

Tartaglia was mooted by some commentators in 2008 as a possible successor to the see of Westminster. Archbishop Vincent Nichols was appointed.

Tartaglia was appointed the Archbishop of Glasgow on 24 July 2012, succeeding Archbishop Mario Conti. He was installed at St Andrew's Cathedral on 8 September of that same year. He received the pallium from Pope Francis at a Mass in St. Peter's Basilica on 29 June 2013.

Pope Benedict XVI appointed Tartaglia as the apostolic administrator of the Archdiocese of Saint Andrews and Edinburgh on 27 February 2013, holding the post until Leo Cushley was enthroned on 21 September 2013 as Archbishop of Saint Andrews and Edinburgh.

Tartaglia died on 13 January 2021, two days after his 70th birthday. He had been self-isolating at his home in Glasgow after testing positive for COVID-19 in late December 2020 during the COVID-19 pandemic in the United Kingdom.

== Views ==
=== LGBT issues ===
In April 2012, at a conference on religious freedom and tolerance at Oxford University, Tartaglia spoke of the death of "a gay Catholic MP who died at the age of 44", a likely reference to David Cairns, whose death from pancreatitis he said was potentially due to his sexuality. He went on to imply that the connection was being avoided, saying "... nobody said anything ... and why his body should just shut down at that age, obviously he could have had a disease which would have killed anyone, but you seem to hear so many stories about this kind of thing, but society won't address it". Cairns's partner Dermot Kehoe criticised Tartaglia for making a claim which was contradicted by the medical evidence, and for adding to the grief suffered by the family of the deceased. He accused Tartaglia of prejudice, homophobia and ignorance and called for him to apologise.

=== Handling of clergy sex abuse ===
In August 2015, Tartaglia commented at a Mass:

The Catholic Bishops of Scotland are shamed and pained by what you have suffered. We say sorry. We ask forgiveness. We apologise to those who have found church reaction slow, unsympathetic or uncaring and we reach out to them as we take up the recommendations of the McLellan Commission.

== Coat of arms ==
Tartaglia's arms are an allusion to the miracle of the loaves and fishes as recounted in the Gospel of Saint John. The two apostles Philip and Andrew are singled out by name in this account. The two fish which are crossed in saltire in reference to the cross of St Andrew are surrounded by five barley loaves. One fish has a gold ring in its mouth. This refers to the legend of St Mungo and is featured in Glasgow's civic and ecclesiastical heraldry since the sixteenth century. This addition alludes to the fact that Philip Tartaglia is a Glaswegian by birth, that he is a former pupil of St Mungo's Academy and is an ordained priest of the Archdiocese of Glasgow.

Conforming to heraldic rules, the colours that feature in the arms – green, white and red – correspond to the Italian Tricolour, in reference to the bishop's family origins and to the years spent in Rome at the Pontifical Scots College, first as an undergraduate and post-graduate student, from 1969 to 1980, and ultimately as rector from May 2004 until November 2005, when he was ordained bishop.

Tartaglia's motto, taken from the Latin hymn O Salutaris Hostia by St Thomas Aquinas, is Da Robur, Fer Auxilium ("Thine aid supply, thy strength bestow").

Catholic Church titles
Preceded by John Mone	Bishop of Paisley; 2005–2012	Succeeded by John Keenan
Preceded by Mario Conti	Archbishop of Glasgow; 2012–2021	Succeeded by William Nolan
