= Diocese of Paisley =

Roman Catholic diocese in Scotland

Diocese of Paisley Dioecesis Pasletana

Catholic
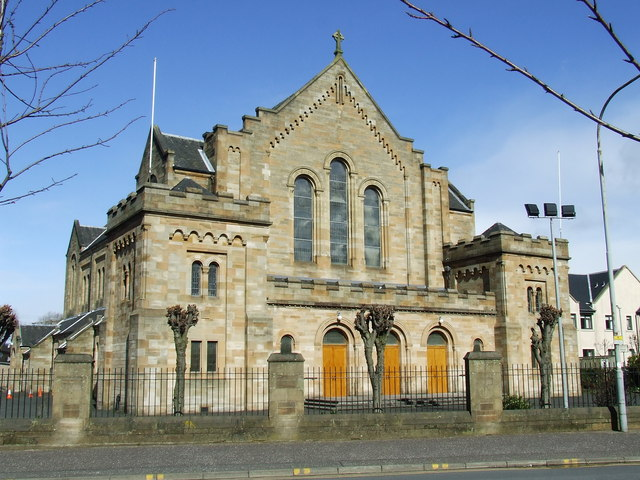
- St Mirin's Cathedral in Paisley

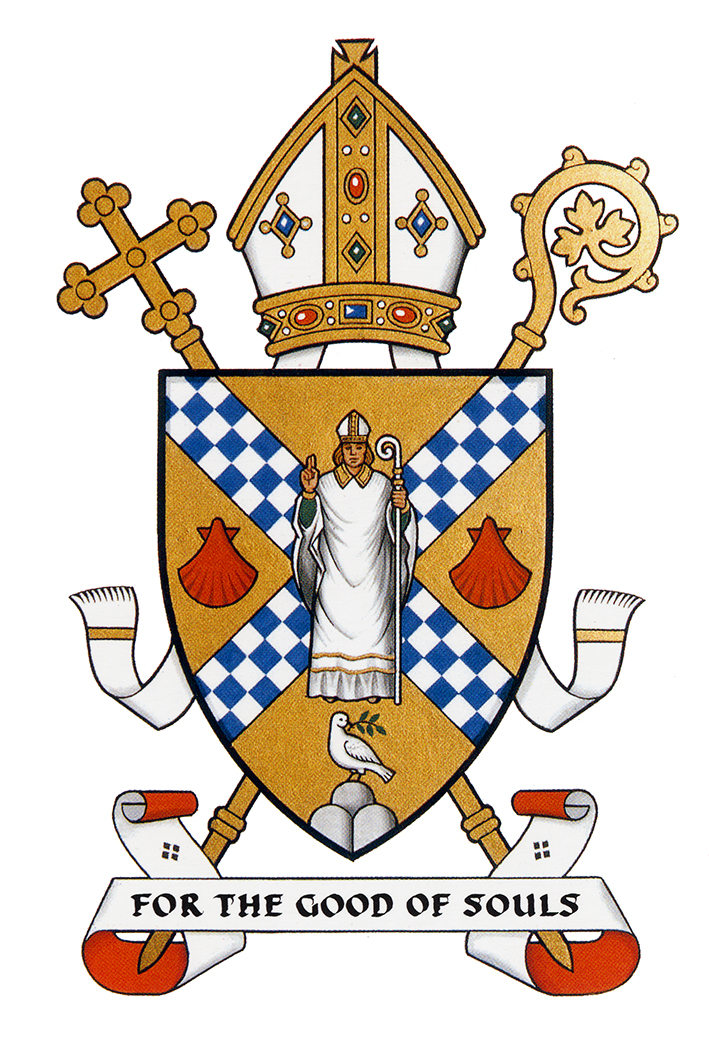
- Coat of arms

Location
- Country: Scotland
- Territory: Most of the council areas of Inverclyde, Renfrewshire and East Renfrewshire
- Ecclesiastical province: Glasgow
- Coordinates: 55.847°N 4.416°W

Statistics
- Area: 580 km^{2} (220 sq mi)
- Population: Total; Catholics: (as of 2021); 381,480; 87,940 (23.1%)
- Parishes: 33

Information
- Denomination: Catholic
- Sui iuris church: Latin Church
- Rite: Roman Rite
- Established: 25 May 1947
- Cathedral: St Mirin's Cathedral, Paisley
- Secular priests: 30

Current leadership
- Pope: Leo XIV
- Bishop: John Keenan
- Metropolitan Archbishop: William Nolan

Website
- rcdop.org.uk

The Diocese of Paisley (Latin: Dioecesis Pasletana) is an ecclesiastical territory or diocese of the Latin Church of the Catholic Church in Scotland. Erected on 25 May 1947 from the Archdiocese of Glasgow, the diocese covers the historic county of Renfrewshire (now the local government areas of Renfrewshire, East Renfrewshire and Inverclyde) and is 580 km^{2} (220 sq mi) in area making it the smallest diocese by area in Scotland.

In 2004 the Catholic population of the diocese was 79,400 out of a total population of 342,000 (23.2%). By 2016 membership increased to 88,600 (23,8%) out of a total population of 372,800.

The diocese comprises 33 parishes served by 30 priests (2021 figures). The diocese is divided into three deaneries namely St Mirin's Deanery (Renfrewshire), St Mary's Deanery (Inverclyde) and St John's Deanery (East Renfrewshire).

The mother house of the religious society the Jericho Benedictines is in the village of Kilbarchan, near the town of Johnstone within the diocese.

The Diocese is led by the Bishop of Paisley, currently the Right Reverend John Keenan, the fifth bishop of the diocese. The mother church of the diocese and seat of the bishop is St Mirin's Cathedral in the town of Paisley. The motto of the diocese is "For the Good of Souls".

== 60th Anniversary ==
On 15 September 2008, the feast day of its patron saint St Mirin, the Diocese of Paisley celebrated its Diamond Jubilee. To mark the occasion a Mass concelebrated by the Apostolic Nuncio to the Court of St. James Archbishop Faustino Sainz Muñoz, the Archbishop of St Andrews and Edinburgh Cardinal Keith O'Brien, the Archbishop of Glasgow Mario Conti, the Bishop of Motherwell Joseph Devine, the Bishop of Aberdeen Peter Moran, the Bishop of Galloway John Cunningham, the Emeritus Bishop of Paisley John Mone, the Bishop of Paisley Philip Tartaglia and many priests of the diocese took place in St Mirin's Cathedral. Present at the Mass were a large number of civic dignitaries and representatives of other churches in Paisley. Representing Queen Elizabeth II were the Lord Lieutenant of Renfrewshire Guy Clark and his deputy James Wardrop.

== Papal visit ==
On 16 September 2010 Pope Benedict XVI made a brief visit to the Diocese of Paisley when he departed from Glasgow Airport, which lies within the diocese to the north of the town of Paisley, for London Heathrow Airport after celebrating Mass at Bellahouston Park in Glasgow. There to wish him farewell from Scotland were the Provost of Renfrewshire Councillor Celia Lawson and the Bishop of Paisley Philip Tartaglia.

== Bishops ==
=== Past and present ordinaries ===
The following is a list of the Bishops of Paisley:

- James Black (appointed 28 February 1948 – died 29 March 1968)
- Stephen McGill, P.S.S. (appointed 25 July 1968 – retired 8 March 1988)
- John Aloysius Mone (appointed 8 March 1988 – retired 7 October 2004)
- Philip Tartaglia (appointed 13 September 2005 - translated to the Archdiocese of Glasgow 8 September 2012)
- John Keenan (appointed 8 February 2014)

=== Paisley Diocesan priests elevated to the episcopacy ===
- John Cunningham, appointed Bishop of Galloway in 2004
- Brian Thomas McGee, appointed Bishop of Argyll and The Isles in 2015

== Sex abuse allegations ==
In April 2026, Clarkston-based Diocese of Paisley priest Father Stephen Ballie was sentenced to 19 months in prison a month after being convicted of sexually assaulting a man at his church home. He immediately began serving his sentence.
