= William Mellon =

Scottish Roman Catholic clergyman

The Right Reverend William Henry Mellon
- Bishop of Galloway
- Church: Roman Catholic
- Diocese: Galloway
- Installed: 24 December 1943
- Term ended: 2 February 1952
- Predecessor: James McCarthy
- Successor: Joseph McGee
- Previous posts: Coadjutor Bishop of Galloway and Titular Bishop of Daulia (1935–43)

Orders
- Ordination: 29 March 1902
- Consecration: 28 October 1935 by Andrew McDonald

Personal details
- Born: 6 January 1877 Edinburgh, Scotland
- Died: 2 February 1952 (aged 75) Dumfries, Scotland
- Motto: Fides Petri in sede Petri

William Henry Mellon (6 January 1877 – 2 February 1952) was a Scottish Roman Catholic clergyman who served as the Bishop of Galloway from 1943 to 1952.

== Biography ==
Born in Edinburgh, Scotland on 6 January 1877, he was ordained to the priesthood on 29 March 1902 for the Archdiocese of St Andrews and Edinburgh. He was appointed Coadjutor Bishop of Galloway and Titular Bishop of Daulia by the Holy See on 21 August 1935. He was consecrated to the Episcopate on 28 October 1935. The principal consecrator was Archbishop Andrew Thomas McDonald of St Andrews and Edinburgh, and the principal co-consecrators were Bishop John Toner of Dunkeld and Bishop George Henry Bennett of Aberdeen.

On the death of Bishop James William McCarthy on 24 December 1943, he automatically succeeded as Bishop of the Diocese of Galloway.

He died in office on 2 February 1952, aged 75.

Catholic Church titles
Preceded by James William McCarthy	Bishop of Galloway; 1943–1952	Succeeded by Joseph Michael McGee
