= Aeneas Chisholm (bishop of Aberdeen) =

Scottish prelate

The Right Reverend Aeneas Chisholm
- Bishop of Aberdeen
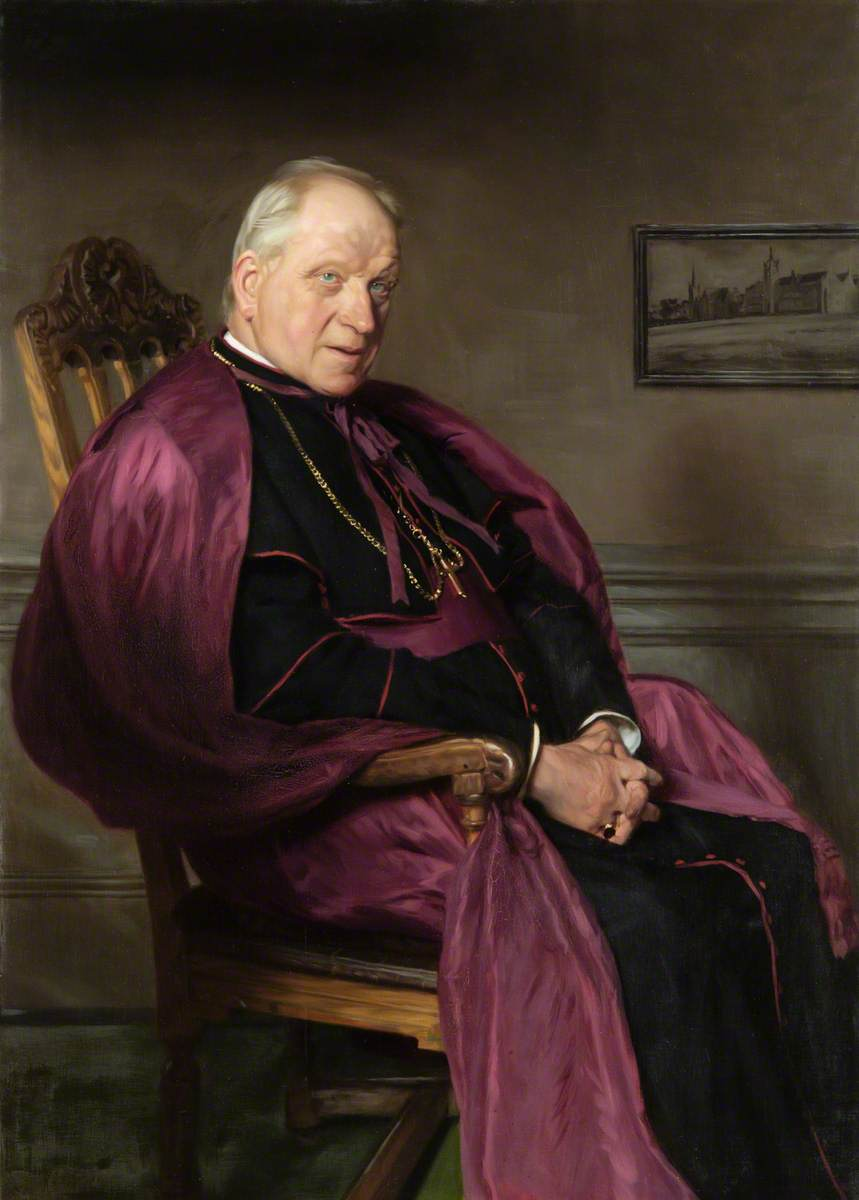
- Church: Roman Catholic
- Diocese: Aberdeen
- Appointed: 7 January 1899
- Term ended: 13 January 1918
- Predecessor: Hugh MacDonald
- Successor: George Bennett

Orders
- Ordination: 15 May 1859
- Consecration: 24 February 1899 by Angus MacDonald

Personal details
- Born: 26 June 1836 Inverness, Scotland
- Died: 13 January 1918 (aged 81)
- Motto: Vi aut virtute

Aeneas Chisholm (26 June 1836 – 13 January 1918) was a Scottish prelate who served as the Roman Catholic Bishop of Aberdeen from 1899 to 1918.

Born in Inverness on 26 June 1836, he was the fourth son of Colin Chisholm, solicitor. He was educated at Blairs College in Kincardineshire, then at the Scots College in Rome. He was ordained a deacon on 1 May 1859 and a priest on 15 May 1859, returning to Scotland in 1860. In 1890, he became the rector of Blairs College. He was awarded honorary degrees of Doctor of Divinity from Rome and Doctor of Laws from the University of Aberdeen. He was appointed the Bishop of the Roman Catholic Diocese of Aberdeen by the Holy See on 7 January 1899, and consecrated to the Episcopate on 24 February 1899. The principal consecrator was Bishop (later Archbishop) Angus MacDonald, and the principal co-consecrators were Bishop (later Archbishop) James August Smith and Bishop William Turner.

He died in office on 13 January 1918, aged 81.

== Arms ==
Gules a boar's head couped Or langued Azure within a bordure engrailed Vert charged with three mitres Argent.

Catholic Church titles
| Preceded by Hugh MacDonald | Bishop of Aberdeen; 1899–1918 | Succeeded by George Henry Bennett |
