= Michael Foylan =

Scottish clergyman

The Right Reverend Michael Foylan
- Bishop of Aberdeen
- Church: Roman Catholic Church
- Diocese: Aberdeen
- Appointed: 8 December 1964
- Term ended: 28 May 1976
- Predecessor: Francis Walsh
- Successor: Mario Conti

Orders
- Ordination: 5 July 1931
- Consecration: 25 March 1965 by Gordon Gray

Personal details
- Born: 29 June 1907; Shettleston, Lanarkshire, Scotland
- Died: 28 May 1976 (aged 68); Aberdeen, Aberdeenshire, Scotland
- Motto: Quis ut Deus

Michael Foylan (29 June 1907 – 28 May 1976) was a Scottish clergyman who served as the Roman Catholic Bishop of Aberdeen from 1964 to 1976.

== Biography ==
Born in Shettleston, Glasgow, Lanarkshire in June 1907, he was ordained a priest on 5 July 1931 for the Diocese of Dunkeld. He was curate of St Andrew's Cathedral, Dundee 1931–1937 and St Joseph's, Dundee 1937–1946. He was appointed parish priest of St Serf's, High Valleyfield in 1946 and returned to St Andrew's Cathedral as parish priest in 1949.

He was appointed the Bishop of the Diocese of Aberdeen by the Holy See on 8 December 1964, and consecrated to the Episcopate on 25 March 1965. The principal consecrator was Archbishop Gordon Joseph Gray, and the principal co-consecrators were Bishop Joseph Michael McGee and Bishop William Andrew Hart. He attended the fourth session of the Second Vatican Council in 1965.

He died in office on 28 May 1976 at the age of 68.

Catholic Church titles
Preceded by Francis Raymond Walsh	Bishop of Aberdeen; 1964–1976	Succeeded by Mario Joseph Conti
