= John Matheson (bishop) =

Scottish Roman Catholic clergyman

The Right Reverend John Matheson
- Bishop of Aberdeen
- Church: Roman Catholic Church
- Diocese: Aberdeen
- Appointed: 2 August 1947
- Term ended: 5 July 1950
- Predecessor: George Bennett
- Successor: Francis Walsh

Orders
- Ordination: 7 March 1925 by Basilio Pompili
- Consecration: 24 September 1947 by Andrew McDonald

Personal details
- Born: John Alexander Matheson; 28 April 1901 Tomintoul, Banffshire, Scotland
- Died: 5 July 1950 (aged 49) Aberdeen, Aberdeenshire, Scotland
- Education: Blairs College
- Alma mater: Pontifical Scots College
- Motto: Manus tua deducet me

John Alexander Matheson (28 April 1901 – 5 July 1950) was a Roman Catholic clergyman who served as the Bishop of Aberdeen from 1947 to 1950.

== Biography ==
Born in Tomintoul, Moray on 28 April 1901, he was educated at Blairs College and studied at the Scots College, Rome. He was ordained a priest on 7 March 1925 in Rome and was curate in St Mary's Cathedral, Aberdeen 1925–28. He was parish priest of Sacred Heart, Aberdeen 1928–30; St Nathalan's, Ballater 1930–43 and St Mary's, Dufftown 1943–47.

He was appointed the Bishop of the Roman Catholic Diocese of Aberdeen by the Holy See on 2 August 1947, and consecrated to the Episcopate on 24 September 1947. The principal consecrator was Archbishop Andrew Thomas McDonald, and the principal co-consecrators were Bishop Kenneth Grant and Bishop (later Archbishop) James Donald Scanlan.

He died in office on 5 July 1950, aged 49, and was succeeded as Bishop of Aberdeen by Francis Walsh, with whom he had attended Fordyce Academy in their youth.

Catholic Church titles
Preceded by George Henry Bennett	Bishop of Aberdeen; 1947–1950	Succeeded by Francis Raymond Walsh
