= William Turner (bishop of Galloway) =

British Roman Catholic clergyman

The Right Reverend William Turner
- Bishop of Galloway
- Church: Roman Catholic Church
- Diocese: Galloway
- Appointed: 16 June 1893
- Term ended: 19 January 1914
- Predecessor: John McLachlan
- Successor: James McCarthy

Orders
- Ordination: 26 April 1868 by Pietro de Villanova Castellacci
- Consecration: 25 July 1893 by Angus MacDonald

Personal details
- Born: 12 December 1844 Aberdeen, Aberdeenshire, Scotland
- Died: 19 January 1914 (aged 69) Dumfries, Dumfries-shire, Scotland
- Education: St Mary's College, Blairs
- Alma mater: Pontifical Scots College
- Motto: Fortitudo mea Dominus

William Turner (12 December 1844 – 19 January 1914) was a British Roman Catholic clergyman who served as the Bishop of Galloway from 1893 to 1914.

== Life ==
He was born in Aberdeen, United Kingdom on 12 December 1844. He entered Blairs College in 1858 and completed his studies at the Scots College, Rome. He was ordained to the priesthood on 26 April 1868.

He was appointed the Bishop of the Diocese of Galloway by the Holy See on 16 June 1893, and consecrated to the Episcopate on 25 July 1893. The principal consecrator was Archbishop Angus MacDonald of St Andrews and Edinburgh, and the principal co-consecrators were Bishop Hugh MacDonald of Aberdeen and Bishop James August Smith of Dunkeld (later Archbishop of St Andrews and Edinburgh).

He died in office on 19 January 1914, aged 69.

Catholic Church titles
Preceded by John McLachlan	Bishop of Galloway; 1893–1914	Succeeded by James William McCarthy
