= St Paul's Roman Catholic Academy =

St. Paul's R.C. Academy
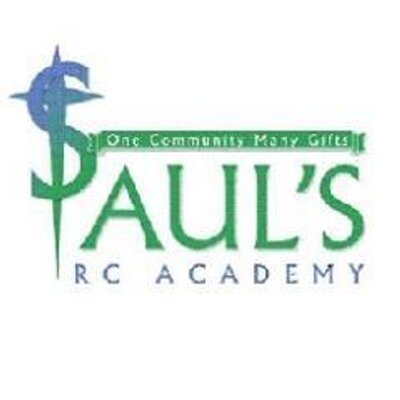

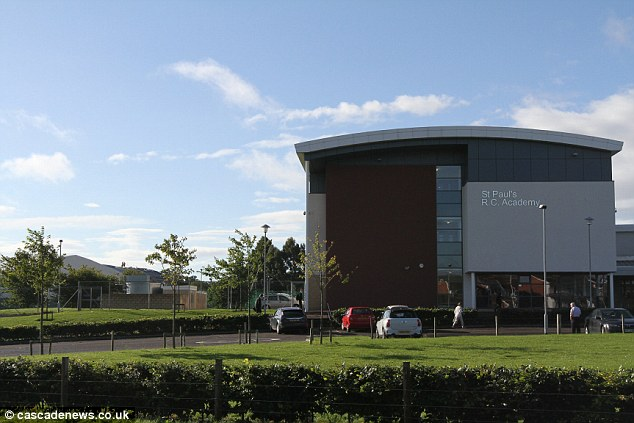

Location
- Gillburn Road; Dundee, DD3 OEH; Scotland; 56.48632°N 2.9787°W

Information
- Type: Secondary School
- Motto: One Community, Many Gifts
- Religious affiliation: Roman Catholic
- Established: 2009; 17 years ago
- Local authority: Dundee City Council
- Head teacher: Kirsty Small
- Staff: 74 (on an FTE basis)
- Gender: Co-educational
- Age: 12 to 18
- Enrolment: 1069
- Houses: St. Andrew's; St. Columba's; St. Margaret's; St. Ninian's; St. Patrick's
- Colours: Black, Green, Blue
- Website: www.st-pauls.ea.dundeecity.sch.uk

St. Paul's R.C. Academy is a Roman Catholic secondary school in Dundee, Scotland.

== History ==
The school was established in 2009 as a merger between Lawside Academy and St. Saviours High School. The combined school occupies a new site on Gillburn Road in the Kirkton area of Dundee, with the two previous sites left empty. As it is north of St. John's, the other Catholic secondary school in Dundee, St. Paul's Academy succeeds Lawside in holding the position as the northernmost state Catholic secondary school in Europe. The academy is named after Paul the Apostle, Paul being the middle name of the Right Reverend Vincent Logan, the ninth bishop of the Diocese of Dunkeld. The school has 6 houses named after saints: St. Andrew, St. Columba, St. Margaret, St. Ninian, St. Patrick and St. Katherine.

As of 2021 the school has an enrollment of 1069 students and although the school is Catholic, it welcomes all religious backgrounds.

== Academics ==
St Paul's offers a wide range of subjects in its curriculum, whilst following the CfE. At St Paul's, courses are available at a wide range of levels including the new National levels 3, 4 and 5 as well as Higher and Advanced Higher depending on the subject.
