= Lawside Academy =

Coordinates: 56.4859°N 3.0020°W

Location
- West School Road; Dundee; Scotland

Information
- Opened: 1907
- Founders: Sisters of Mercy
- Closed: June 2008

Lawside Academy was a Roman Catholic secondary school in Dundee, Scotland. It was the northernmost state Catholic school in Europe. Lawside closed in June 2008, 101 years after it opened. The school's successor is St Paul's Academy.

== History ==
Lawside was founded as an independent school for girls by the Sisters of Mercy in 1907, but soon began to admit boys. The school was operated on the same site as the convent, which was located on the lower slopes of the Dundee Law (the word means hill); hence the name of both convent and school.

With the Education (Scotland) Act 1918, the school chose to enter the state system as the act laid out certain guarantees for denominational schools which came under state control. Amongst the prerogatives that Lawside had were that the rector or vice-rector would come from the Sisters of Mercy if one was suitably qualified. A member of the Sisters held the position of vice-rector into the 1970s.

Whilst non-denominational schools tended to provide only a weekly period of religious education, Catholic schools were permitted a period each day, something which Lawside maintained until the 1990s, when this was reduced to three 40 min periods per week, then to two 50 min periods in 2005. A bonus particularly enjoyed by students until the late 1970s was that school began an hour later on days which were major religious feasts; this was to allow students to attend morning Mass in their respective parish churches.

Until 1962, Lawside was both a primary and secondary school with many of its pupils attending only Lawside for the whole of their education. However, the primary intake of 1955 was to be the last, and from 1962, the school catered only for secondary level students.

As the school enrollment grew, the need arose for physical expansion of the facilities. However, the convent grounds were unsuitable, and so the "Annex", a former primary school, was opened on Blackness Road. One bonus of being in the "Annex" was that it was much closer to the centre of town than the main school, and so afforded greater opportunity for lunch time wanderings.

Both wings of the school moved to a new campus just off Macalpine Road in the northern part of Dundee in 1966. As was then traditional, the school was split into houses: St. Peters, St. Pauls and St. Andrews, the patron saint of Scotland; each had a housemaster and housemistress.

Until the introduction of comprehensive education in the 1970s, Lawside served as the only Catholic academy for a long way, with students travelling from places such as Perth, Forfar, Arbroath and northern Fife.

== School badge ==
The school badge was of an unusual design, resembling a three leafed clover, which represented the Holy Trinity. It consisted of the crossed keys of Saint Peter surmounted by a papal tiara. The letters "L.A." for Lawside Academy were found in the two lower circles, whilst the school motto "Laborare et Orare" ("to work and to pray") from the Order of St Benedict curved around the edge.

== Closure ==
In 2002, Dundee City Council decided to merge Lawside with St Saviour's RC High School which served Catholic children from the eastern side of the city, and the appointed rector of the new school, Moria Leck, decided to call the new school St Paul's Academy. Paul is the middle name of the Right Reverend Vincent Paul Logan, the Catholic bishop of the Diocese of Dunkeld in which Dundee is located. The schools merged for the new academic year 2008-2009, one year after Lawside's centenary celebrations in 2007.

The site was demolished in 2009.
