= Francis Walsh (bishop) =

The Right Reverend Francis Walsh M. Afr.
- Bishop Emeritus of Aberdeen
- Church: Roman Catholic Church
- Diocese: Aberdeen
- Appointed: 20 June 1951
- Term ended: 22 July 1963
- Predecessor: John Matheson
- Successor: Michael Foylan
- Other post: Titular Bishop of Birtha (1963-1970)

Orders
- Ordination: 7 March 1925
- Consecration: 12 September 1951 by Donald Campbell

Personal details
- Born: 15 September 1901 Cirencester, Gloucestershire, England
- Died: 27 October 1974 (aged 73) Grantham, Lincolnshire, England
- Parents: James and Florence Walsh (née Silley)
- Motto: Ut sint unum (that they may be one)

Francis Raymond Walsh, M. Afr., (15 September 1901– 27 October 1974) was a Roman Catholic clergyman who served as the Bishop of Aberdeen from 1951 to 1963.

== Biography ==
Born in Cirencester, Gloucestershire, England on 15 September 1901, he was educated at Fordyce Academy, Banffshire, Blairs College, Aberdeen, and the Scots College in Rome.

Walsh was ordained a priest on 7 March 1925. He was professed a member of the Missionaries of Africa on 9 September 1931. He was appointed the Bishop of the Diocese of Aberdeen by the Holy See on 20 June 1951, and consecrated to the Episcopate on 12 September 1951. The principal consecrator was Archbishop Donald Alphonsus Campbell, and the principal co-consecrators were Bishop James Black and Bishop (later Archbishop) James Donald Scanlan. He attended the first session of the Second Vatican Council in 1962.

He resigned as Bishop of Aberdeen on 22 July 1963. He was appointed Titular Bishop of Birtha on 12 September 1963, but resigned the title on 7 December 1970. He died in Grantham on 27 October 1974, aged 73.

Catholic Church titles
Preceded by John Alexander Matheson	Bishop of Aberdeen; 1951–1963	Succeeded by Michael Foylan
