= William Smith (bishop) =

Scottish Catholic clergyman (1819-1892)

The Most Reverend William Smith
- Archbishop of St Andrews and Edinburgh
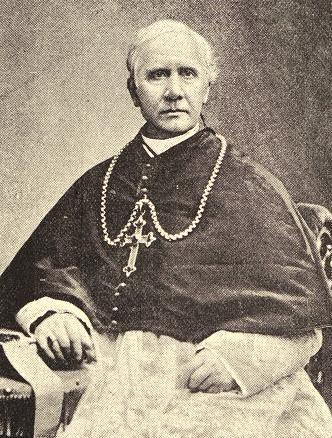
- 1897 picture
- Church: Roman Catholic
- Archdiocese: St Andrews and Edinburgh
- Appointed: 2 October 1885
- Term ended: 16 March 1892
- Predecessor: John Strain
- Successor: Angus MacDonald

Orders
- Ordination: 15 April 1843
- Consecration: 28 October 1885 by Charles Eyre
- Rank: Metropolitan Archbishop

Personal details
- Born: 3 July 1819 Edinburgh, Scotland
- Died: 16 March 1892 (aged 72) Edinburgh, Scotland
- Education: Blairs College
- Alma mater: Pontifical Scots College
- Motto: Marte et ingenio

William Smith (3 July 1819 – 16 March 1892) was a Catholic clergyman from Scotland. He served as the Archbishop of the Archdiocese of St Andrews and Edinburgh.

== Life ==
Born in Edinburgh on 3 July 1819, he entered Blairs College in July 1832 to begin studies for the priesthood. He continued his studies at the Scots College, Rome in August 1836 and was ordained a priest on 15 April 1843. He returned to Scotland and was appointed professor of Latin, Greek and Hebrew at Blairs. In 1852, he was tasked with the reorganization of the Scots Monastery, Regensburg. After a year and a half, he was recalled to Scotland to serve as rector of St Clement's Academy, Wellburn and as priest in charge of the Lochee mission. He later succeeded George Rigg as priest in charge of St Mary's, Edinburgh. Subsequently, he was appointed to Dalkeith, Oakley, Dunfermline and Perth. In 1869, the degree of Doctor of Divinity was bestowed upon him in recognition of his publication The Book of Moses. In 1878, he was once again given charge of St Mary's, Edinburgh and was appointed vicar general of the newly established Archdiocese of St Andrews and Edinburgh. He was also named a Domestic Prelate.

He was appointed the Archbishop of St. Andrews and Edinburgh on 2 October 1885 and consecrated on 28 October 1885. The principal consecrator was Archbishop Charles Petre Eyre, with Bishops John McLachlan and Angus MacDonald as co-consecrators. He erected a chapter with a provost and eleven canons for his cathedral. He also convened and presided over the First Plenary Council of Scotland which took place at Fort Augustus Abbey.

Smith died in office on 16 March 1892, aged 72.

== Works ==
The Book of Moses; or, The Pentateuch in its Authorship, Credibility, and Civilization

Catholic Church titles
Preceded by John Menzies Strain	Archbishop of St. Andrews and Edinburgh; 1885–1892	Succeeded by Angus MacDonald
