= Diocese of Dunkeld (disambiguation) =

The Diocese of Dunkeld may refer to:

- Diocese of Dunkeld, one of the 13 historical dioceses of the Scottish church
- Roman Catholic Diocese of Dunkeld, modern Roman Catholic diocese resurrected in the late 19th century upon the model of the old diocese, but based at Dundee
- Diocese of St Andrews, Dunkeld and Dunblane, Scottish episcopal created in the 18th century on the model of three earlier dioceses combined, and based at Perth
