= St Andrew's College, Drygrange =

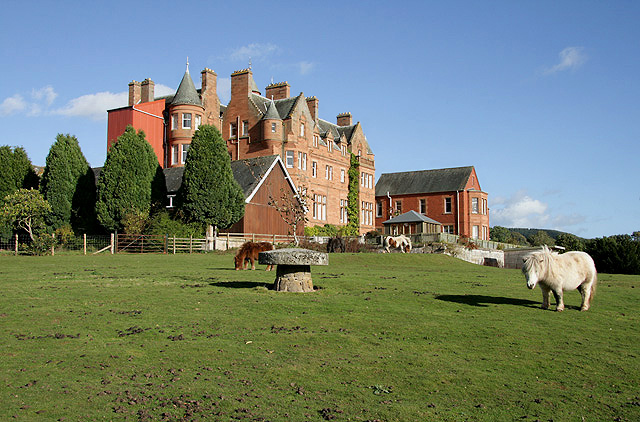

- Location of the college within Scottish Borders
- 55.610935°N 2.671984°W
- Location: Melrose
- Country: Scotland
- Denomination: Roman Catholic

History
- Former name: Drygrange House
- Founded: 1953; 73 years ago (as seminary)
- Founder: Archbishop Gordon Gray (later Cardinal)
- Dedication: Saint Andrew

Architecture
- Heritage designation: Category B-listed building
- Designated: 4 June 1991; 35 years ago
- Architect(s): John Peddie and Charles Kinnear
- Closed: 1986; 40 years ago (as seminary)

Administration
- Archdiocese: St Andrews and Edinburgh
- Deanery: St Cuthbert's Borders

St Andrew's College, Drygrange, located near Melrose, Scotland, was a Roman Catholic seminary founded in 1953 and closed in 1986.

== History ==
=== Foundation ===
Founded by Gordon Gray shortly after he became Archbishop of St Andrews and Edinburgh, the college was operated by the archdiocese in a large country house called Drygrange House. The house, standing north of the Leaderfoot Viaduct, included sizeable grounds bordered by the River Leader, a tributary of the River Tweed.

=== Closure ===
The archdiocese took the decision to close the college with effect from the autumn of 1986. The closure was blamed by then-Archbishop Keith O'Brien, himself a former student of the seminary, on the halving of the number of new Scottish entrants to the priesthood.

The remaining students were transferred to Gillis College, Edinburgh, the new seminary for the archdiocese, and some 2,300 items from the college's library were deposited in the National Library of Scotland.

On another analysis, the new Gillis College was the seminary of St Andrew's, transferred to a new site and renamed.

In 1987, the archdiocese sold the college's former buildings at Drygrange for £250,000 and they became a nursing home called St Andrews Nursing Home, after going into administration it was sold and in March 2001 the new owners changed it to Grange Hall Care Home which has become (Jan 2017) one of the most successful and highest graded care homes in the Scottish Borders.

In 1993, Gillis College also closed, and Chesters College, Bearsden, later renamed Scotus College, became the national seminary for Scotland.

== Notable alumni ==
- Paul Kamuza Bakyenga, Archbishop of Mbarara
- Dennis Canavan, Scottish politician
- Bishop Vincent Logan
- Cardinal Keith O'Brien
- Bishop Stephen Robson

== Gallery ==
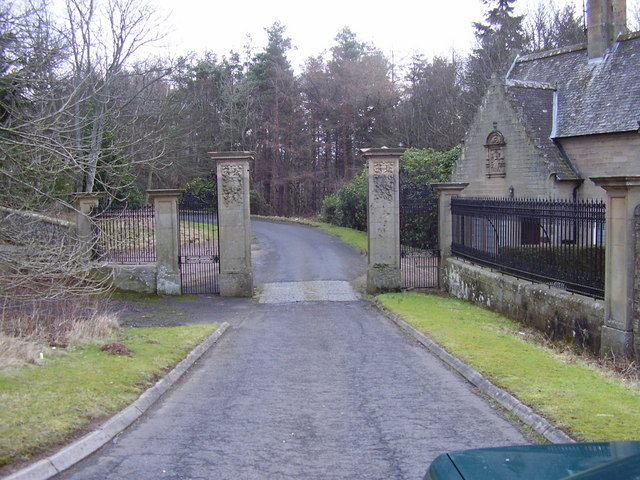
The entrance to the former Drygrange House, in the Scottish Borders (2008).

== See also ==
- List of listed buildings in Melrose, Scottish Borders
- List of Roman Catholic seminaries
- List of schools in Scotland
