= Hugh MacDonald (bishop of Aberdeen) =

Scottish Roman Catholic clergyman

The Right Reverend Hugh MacDonald, CSsR
- Bishop of Aberdeen
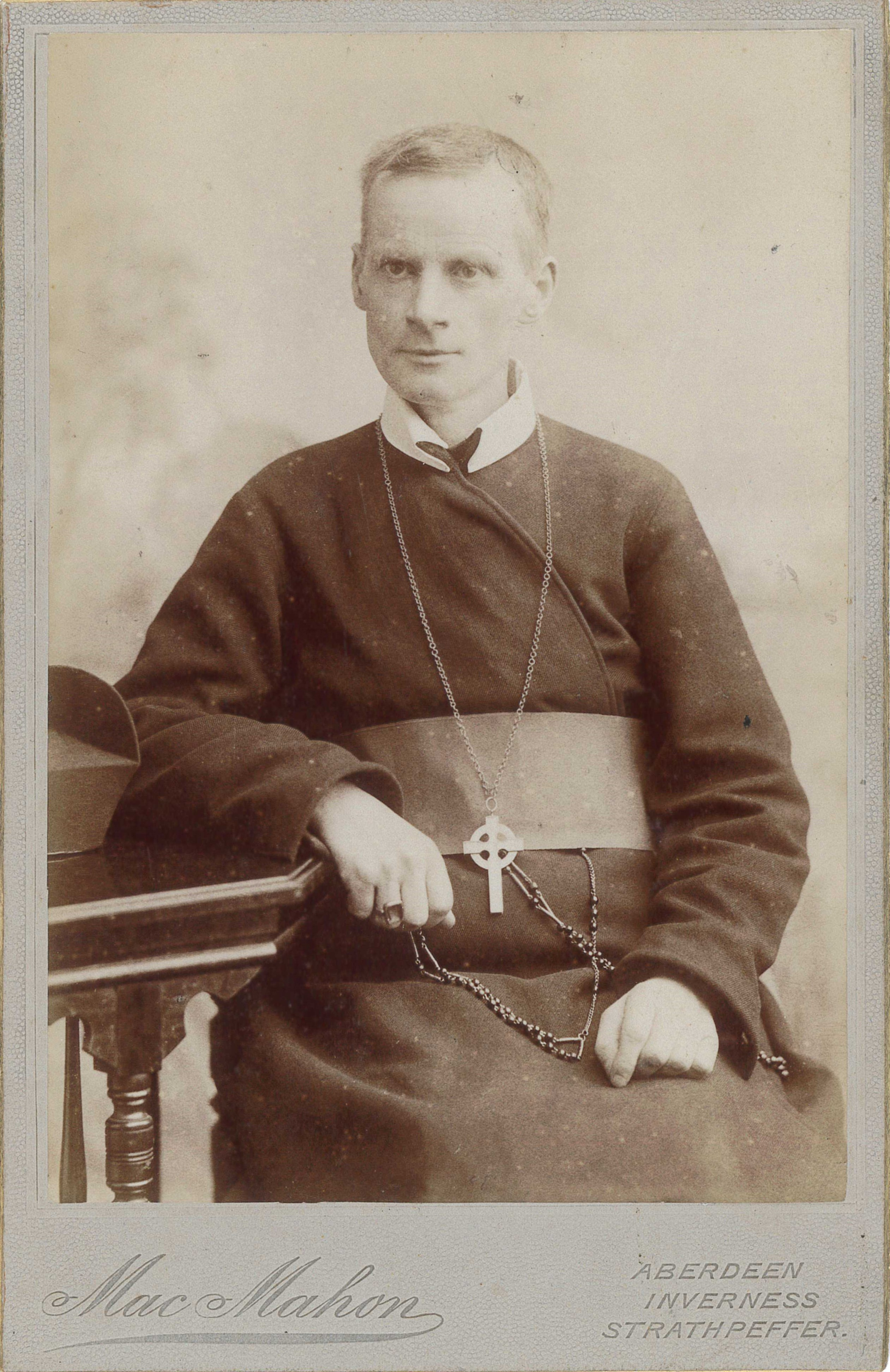
- Bishop Hugh MacDonald CSsR
- Province: St Andrews and Edinburgh
- Diocese: Aberdeen
- In office: 1890–1898
- Predecessor: Colin Grant
- Successor: Aeneas Chisholm
- Previous post: Provincial of the Congregation of the Redemptorists

Orders
- Ordination: 21 September 1867 (Priest)
- Consecration: 14 August 1890 (Bishop) by William Smith

Personal details
- Born: 7 November 1841 Borrodale, Isle of Skye, Scotland
- Died: 29 May 1898 (aged 56) Edinburgh, Scotland
- Denomination: Roman Catholic Church
- Parents: Angus MacDonald and Mary MacDonald (née Watson)
- Education: St Cuthbert's College, Ushaw

Hugh MacDonald CSsR (7 November 1841 – 29 May 1898) was a Roman Catholic clergyman who served as the Bishop of Aberdeen from 1890 to 1898.

== Early life ==
Born in Borrodale on the Isle of Skye on 7 November 1841, he was the second son of Angus MacDonald and Mary MacDonald (née Watson). His younger brother was Angus MacDonald, Archbishop of St. Andrews and Edinburgh. Hugh MacDonald was educated at St Cuthbert's College, Ushaw. On the completion of his studies, he taught there for a year as Professor of Humanities.

== Priestly career ==
Ordained to the priesthood on 21 September 1867, he acted for two or three years as a secular priest in Greenock. Subsequently, joining the Congregation of the Redemptorists, he conducted many missions, but was especially valued in the Highlands from his thorough acquaintance with the Gaelic language. For several years he acted as rector of the Redemptorist Monastery at Kinnoull, and was later appointed Provincial of the Order.

== Episcopal career ==
He was appointed the Bishop of the Diocese of Aberdeen by the Holy See on 14 August 1890, and consecrated to the Episcopate on 23 October 1890. The principal consecrator was Archbishop William Smith, and the principal co-consecrators were Bishop John McLachlan and Bishop (later Archbishop) Angus MacDonald.

He died at Greenhill Gardens, Edinburgh, the residence of his brother, Archbishop MacDonald, on 29 May 1898, aged 56.

Catholic Church titles
Preceded by Colin Grant	Bishop of Aberdeen; 1890–1898	Succeeded by Aeneas Chisholm
