= Angus MacFarlane =

Angus MacFarlane may refer to:

- Gus MacFarlane (1925–1991), Canadian Liberal MP for Hamilton Mountain, 1974–1979
- Angus Macfarlane, New Zealand academic and professor at the University of Canterbury
- Angus MacFarlane (bishop) (1843–1912), Scottish Roman Catholic Bishop of Dunkeld, 1901–1912
