= Martin Chambers (priest) =

Scottish Roman Catholic clergyman (1964–2024)

The Reverend Martin Chambers
- Bishop-Elect of Dunkeld
- Church: Roman Catholic
- Diocese: Dunkeld
- Appointed: 2 February 2024
- Term ended: 10 April 2024
- Predecessor: Stephen Robson
- Successor: Andrew McKenzie

Orders
- Ordination: 26 March 1988 (Deacon) by Thomas Winning; 25 August 1989 (Priest) by Maurice Taylor

Personal details
- Born: Martin James Chambers; 8 June 1964 Glasgow, Scotland
- Died: 10 April 2024 (aged 59) Troon, South Ayrshire, Scotland
- Denomination: Roman Catholicism
- Education: St Vincent's College, Langbank; Royal Scots College

Martin James Chambers (8 June 1964 – 10 April 2024) was a Scottish Roman Catholic clergyman and Bishop-Elect of Dunkeld.

== Biography ==
Chambers was born on 8 June 1964. He was educated at St.Vincent's College, Langbank and St Mary's College, Blairs. He studied philosophy and Catholic theology at the Pontifical University of Salamanca while training for the priesthood at the Royal Scots College.

Chambers was ordained a deacon on 26 March 1988 at the Church of the Royal Scots College by Thomas Winning, Archbishop of Glasgow, and was ordained to the priesthood on 25 August 1989 at the parish church of St Mary, Irvine, by the Bishop of Galloway, Maurice Taylor.

After ordination, Chambers initially worked as parochial vicar of St. John's Parish in Stevenston before becoming parish priest of St. Thomas the Apostle Parish in Muirkirk in 1993. He also served as deputy director of the Diocesan Office for Vocations Pastoral Care from 1993 to 1995 and from 1993 to 2000 he was also responsible for coordinating Catholic education in the Roman Catholic Diocese of Galloway. After briefly serving as vicar of St. Bride's parish in West Kilbride from 1996 to 1997, Chambers became vicar of St. John's parish in Stevenston. From 2004 to 2009 he served as a missionary for the Society of St. James the Apostle in the Archdiocese of Guayaquil in Guayaquil, Ecuador. In 2009 Chambers returned home and became parish priest of St. Matthew's parish in Kilmarnock. From 2015 he was also parish priest of Our Lady of Mount Carmel parish in Kilmarnock. He also served as parish administrator for the parishes of St. Paul in Hurlford (2003–2015) and St. Sophia in Galston (2013–2015). In addition, from 2018, Chambers also headed the diocesan office for vocations pastoral care and the diocesan office for the continuing education of permanent deacons.

On 2 February 2024, Pope Francis appointed him Bishop of Dunkeld. However, Chambers died in Troon on 10 April 2024, before his episcopal ordination, which was to take place on 27 April 2024. He was 59. His funeral took place on 29 April 2024 in Our Lady of the Assumption, Troon.

Catholic Church titles
Preceded by Stephen Robson	Bishop-Elect of Dunkeld; 2024	Succeeded by Andrew McKenzie
