= Andrew McDonald (bishop) =

Catholic archbishop

The Most Reverend Andrew Thomas McDonald O.S.B.
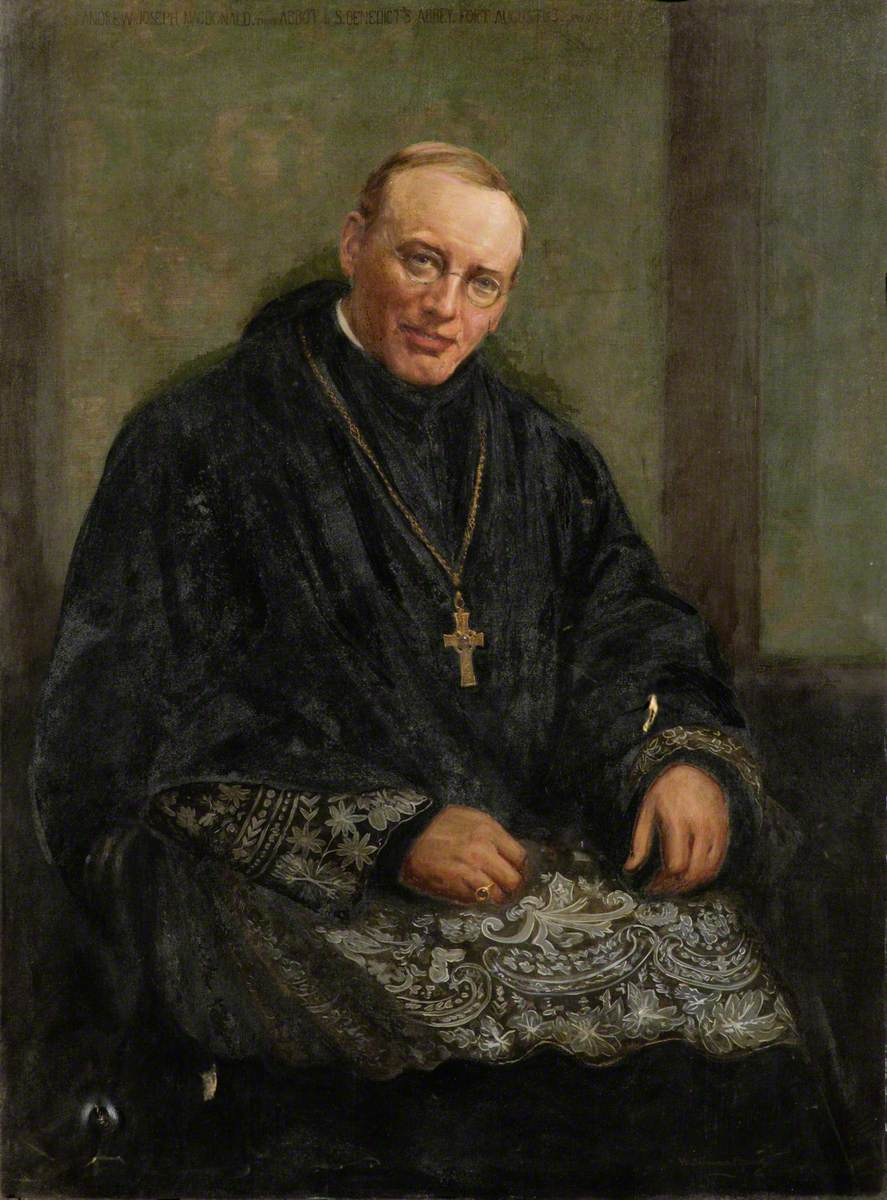
- Portrait by William Drummond Young, 1920
- Church: Roman Catholic
- Archdiocese: St Andrews and Edinburgh
- Appointed: 19 July 1929
- Term ended: 22 May 1950
- Predecessor: James Smith
- Successor: Gordon Gray
- Previous post: Abbot of Fort Augustus

Orders
- Ordination: 9 August 1896 by Hugh MacDonald
- Consecration: 24 September 1929 by Donald Mackintosh

Personal details
- Born: Joseph McDonald; 12 February 1871 Fort William, Scotland
- Died: 22 May 1950 (aged 79) Edinburgh, Scotland
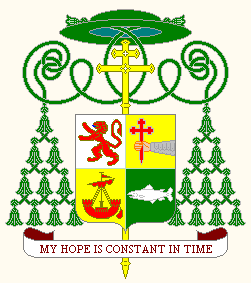
- Coat of arms

Andrew Thomas McDonald, O.S.B., (12 February 1871 – 22 May 1950) was a Roman Catholic clergyman who served as the Archbishop of the Archdiocese of St. Andrews and Edinburgh, United Kingdom.

== Life ==
Born in Fort William on 12 February 1871, he entered the college at Fort Augustus Abbey on 7 September 1882 and continued his studies at Bonn and Cologne. In 1888 he entered Fort Augustus and made his solemn profession on 10 February 1893. He was ordained a priest of Order of Saint Benedict on 9 August 1896. In 1898 he was named Sub-prior and cellarer. In 1908, he conducted missions in Glasgow, Clydebank, Musselburgh and Cambuslang. From 1911, he was attached to Ampleforth Abbey and served as curate at St Anne's, Edge Hill. He later became rector of the church and held office until he was elected Abbot of Fort Augustus on 27 August 1919.

He was appointed the Archbishop of St. Andrews and Edinburgh on 19 July 1929 and consecrated to the Episcopate on 24 September 1929. The principal consecrator was Archbishop Donald Mackintosh, and the principal co-consecrators were Bishop James William McCarthy and Bishop John Toner. During his tenure, the number of priests in the diocese increased from 115 to 219, and the number of churches and chapels from 85 to 122.

David Ogilvy described McDonald as, "a very sweet old man, the nearest thing to an angel I've ever known".

He died in office on 22 May 1950, aged 79.

Catholic Church titles
Preceded by James August Smith	Archbishop of St. Andrews and Edinburgh; 1929–1950	Succeeded by Gordon Joseph Gray
