= George Bennett (bishop) =

British Roman Catholic clergyman

The Right Reverend George Bennett
- Bishop of Aberdeen
- Church: Roman Catholic Church
- Diocese: Aberdeen
- Appointed: 18 June 1918
- Term ended: 25 December 1946
- Predecessor: Aeneas Chisholm
- Successor: John Matheson

Orders
- Ordination: 9 April 1898
- Consecration: 1 August 1918 by John Maguire

Personal details
- Born: 24 June 1875 St. John's, Antigua
- Died: 25 December 1946 (aged 71) Aberdeen, Scotland
- Motto: Benedictus qui tollis crucem

George Henry Bennett (24 June 1875 – 25 December 1946) was a Roman Catholic clergyman who served as the Bishop of Aberdeen from 1918 to 1946.

== Biography ==
Born in St. John's on the island of Antigua in the Caribbean Sea on 24 June 1875, he was ordained a priest on 9 April 1898. He was appointed the Bishop of the Diocese of Aberdeen by the Holy See on 18 June 1918, and consecrated to the Episcopate on 1 August 1918. The principal consecrator was Archbishop John Aloysius Maguire of Glasgow, and the principal co-consecrators were Bishop John Toner of Dunkeld and Bishop James William McCarthy of Galloway.

He died in office on 25 December 1946, aged 71.

Catholic Church titles
Preceded by Aeneas Chisholm	Bishop of Aberdeen; 1918–1946	Succeeded by John Alexander Matheson
