= Angus MacFarlane (bishop) =

Scottish Roman Catholic clergyman

The Right Reverend Angus MacFarlane
- Bishop of Dunkeld
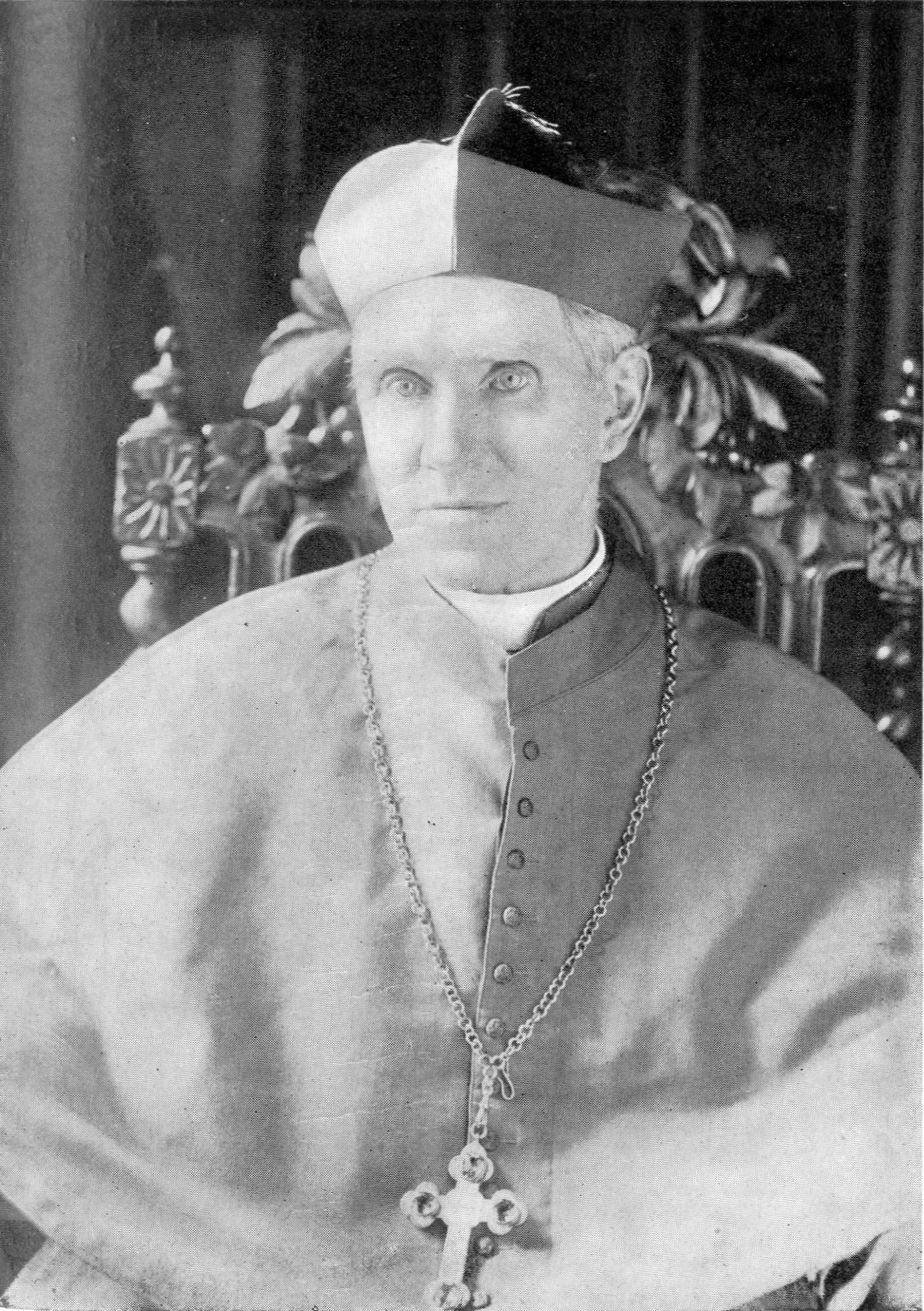
- Church: Roman Catholic
- Diocese: Dunkeld
- Appointed: 21 February 1901
- Term ended: 24 September 1912
- Predecessor: James Augustine Smith
- Successor: Robert Fraser

Orders
- Ordination: 26 April 1868
- Consecration: 1 May 1901 by James Augustine Smith

Personal details
- Born: 10 January 1843 Spean Bridge, Inverness-shire, Scotland
- Died: 24 September 1912 (aged 69) Dundee, Angus, Scotland
- Buried: Balgay Cemetery, Dundee
- Education: Blairs College
- Alma mater: Pontifical Scots College; Pontifical Gregorian University

Angus MacFarlane (10 January 1843 – 24 September 1912) was a Scottish Roman Catholic clergyman who served as the Bishop of Dunkeld from 1901 to 1912

== Biography ==
Angus MacFarlane was born in Spean Bridge, Lochaber, Scotland on 10 January 1843. He began preparation for the priesthood at Blairs College in 1858 and continued to the Scots College, Rome in 1862. He received the subdiaconate on 11 April 1868, followed by the diaconate on the 19 April, and was ordained to the priesthood on 26 April 1868. During the First Vatican Council, he acted as a stenographer. He returned to Scotland in 1870, and was made secretary to Archbishop Eyre and then was named Rector of St Peter's College, Partickhill (1878–80). Following his time as Rector, he was given charge of the mission at Houston and after a brief stay, was given charge of Johnstone in 1881. In 1884, he was named a canon of Glasgow Cathedral chapter and was a Vicar general of Glasgow (1894–1901). In 1899, he became parish priest of St Columbkille's, Rutherglen.

MacFarlane was appointed the Bishop of the Diocese of Dunkeld by the Holy See on 21 February 1901, and consecrated to the Episcopate on 1 May 1901. The principal consecrator was Archbishop James Smith of St Andrews and Edinburgh, and the principal co-consecrators were Bishop William Turner of Galloway and Archbishop John Aloysius Maguire of Glasgow.

He died in office on 24 September 1912, aged 69.

Catholic Church titles
Preceded by James August Smith	Bishop of Dunkeld; 1901–1912	Succeeded by Robert Fraser
