= Stephen Robson =

British RC bishop (born 1951)

The Right Reverend Stephen Robson
- Bishop Emeritus of Dunkeld
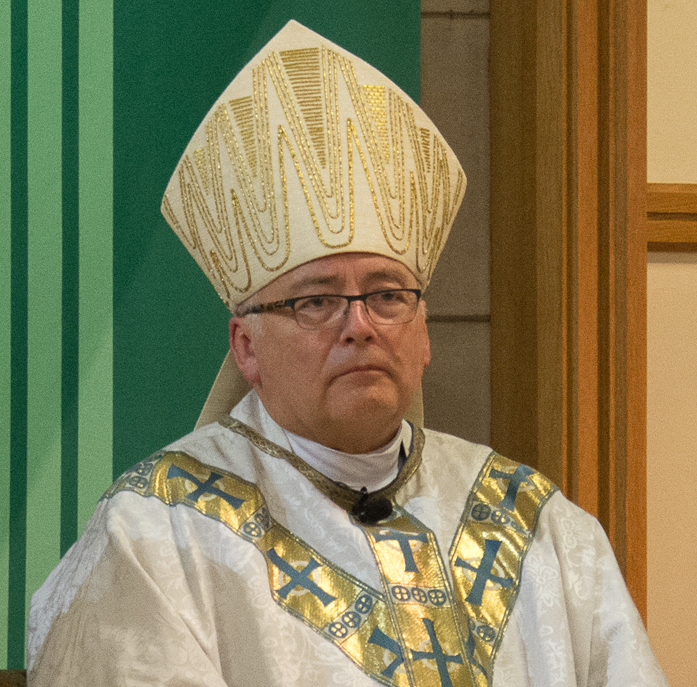
- Bishop Robson in 2015
- Diocese: Dunkeld
- Appointed: 11 December 2013
- Installed: 9 January 2014
- Term ended: 28 December 2022
- Predecessor: Vincent Paul Logan
- Successor: Martin Chambers

Orders
- Ordination: 17 March 1979 by Gordon Joseph Gray
- Consecration: 9 June 2012 by Keith Patrick O'Brien

Personal details
- Born: Stephen Robson; 1 April 1951 (age 75) Carlisle, Cumberland, England
- Denomination: Roman Catholic
- Parents: Leslie and Margery Robson
- Education: University of Edinburgh; (BSc 1974; MTh 1986); St Andrew's College, Drygrange; Pontifical Gregorian University; (STL 2000; STD 2003; JCL 2006)
- Motto: Peregrinator pro Christo; (Pilgrim for Christ)

Styles of Stephen Robson
- Reference style: The Right Reverend
- Spoken style: Your Lordship
- Religious style: Bishop

Stephen Robson (born 1 April 1951) is the retired bishop of the Roman Catholic Diocese of Dunkeld. From 2012 to 2014 he was auxiliary bishop of the Archdiocese of St Andrews and Edinburgh.

== Early life ==
Stephen Robson was born in Carlisle, in the Diocese of Lancaster, on 1 April 1951. Baptised in the Anglican tradition on 15 May 1951, he became a Roman Catholic while a teenager. After secondary school he attended the University of Edinburgh where he obtained a degree in biological sciences with a specialisation in medical technology at Napier College of Science in Edinburgh. He was heavily influenced by the local Jesuit community while studying in Edinburgh.

== Formation and further studies ==
Robson completed his studies for ordination at St Andrew's College, Drygrange. During his ministry at the Pontifical Scots College in Rome he gained a Licentiate and Doctorate in Spiritual Theology and a Licentiate in Canon Law at the Pontifical Gregorian University.

In 2004, his doctoral thesis, entitled "With the Spirit and Power of Elijah: The Prophetic-reforming Spirituality of Bernard of Clairvaux as Evidenced Particularly in His Letters", received the Gregorian University's Bellarmine Medal, awarded to recognise the best thesis submitted each year in theology. Cistercian P. Alkuin Schachenmayr wrote that "dozens of passages in Robson’s dissertation" seemed identical to passages published by other authors, yet without giving them proper attribution. An investigation by the Gregorian cleared Robson of these charges in 2020.

In 2021, philosopher M.V. Dougherty identified multiple further examples of plagiarism in Robson's monograph and raised concerns about the thoroughness and independence of the Gregorian's investigation.

== Priesthood ==
Robson was ordained deacon on 12 February 1978, and priest on 17 March 1979 for the Archdiocese of St Andrews and Edinburgh.

He subsequently held a number of pastoral assignments. Following his period at St Mary's College, Blairs, he spent over a year around 1986 living at Ampleforth Abbey while discerning a vocation to monastic life. He later served as Cardinal Keith O'Brien's private secretary; their friendship extended over 35 years (“He has been involved with me in pastoral work and school work, seminary apostolate and during his further studies," wrote the cardinal) and culminated in Robson's 2012 appointment as O'Brien's auxiliary bishop. Soon after, in 2013, O'Brien resigned following allegations of sexual misconduct with priests and seminarians.

From 1998 to 2006 Robson was the spiritual director of the Pontifical Scots College in Rome.

On returning to Scotland he became Chancellor of the Archdiocese of Saint Andrews and Edinburgh and pastor of the united parishes of Our Lady's in North Berwick and Dunbar. He also served as a judge of the Scottish National Catholic Tribunal.

== Episcopal ministry ==
=== Auxiliary bishop ===
Robson's appointment was announced on 8 May 2012 by Pope Benedict XVI and he received episcopal consecration on 9 June 2012, the Feast of St Columba, from Keith Patrick Cardinal O'Brien with Archbishops Antonio Mennini and Mario Conti serving as co-consecrators. He was assigned the titular see of Tunnuna in Tunisia.

Immediately following his episcopal consecration he served as the representative of the Bishops' Conference of Scotland at the 50th International Eucharistic Congress in Dublin from 10–17 June 2012. As auxiliary bishop, Robson became a member of the bishops' conference. Following his episcopal ordination, he continued chancellor of the archdiocese and served as parish priest at Ss John Cantius and Nicholas, Broxburn, beginning in September 2012.

When Cardinal O'Brien resigned in February 2013 after being accused of sexual misconduct by other priests, Robson was named apostolic administrator and entrusted with running the daily affairs of the archdiocese. Robson and O'Brien had been close for over 30 years; they met while colleagues on the staff of St Mary’s College, Blairs.

In March 2013 Robson was appointed to be one of the twelve members of the controversial McLellan Commission, which was to review how the Scottish Church deals with accusations of sexual abuse; Kevin McKenna of The Guardian called its August 2015 report a "whitewash".

=== Bishop of Dunkeld ===
On 11 December 2013, Robson was appointed Bishop of Dunkeld by Pope Francis. He was installed in St Andrew's Cathedral, Dundee, on 9 January 2014. He announced his resignation on 28 December 2022, citing ill health.

=== Apostleship of the Sea ===
In February 2015, Robson was appointed bishop promoter and a trustee of Catholic seafarers' charity Apostleship of the Sea.

Catholic Church titles
Preceded by Vincent Logan	Bishop of Dunkeld; 2014–2022	Succeeded by Martin Chambers
