= James Smith (archbishop of St Andrews and Edinburgh) =

Scottish Roman Catholic bishop (1841–1928)

The Most Reverend James Augustine Smith
- Archbishop of Saint Andrews and Edinburgh
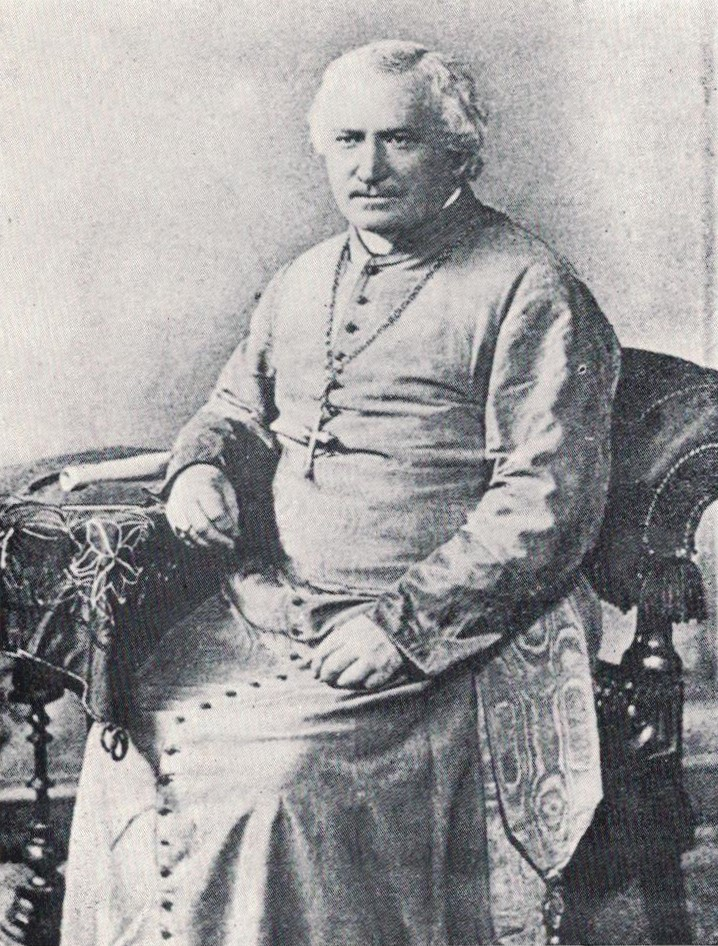
- Archdiocese: Saint Andrews and Edinburgh
- Appointed: 30 August 1900
- Term ended: 24 November 1928
- Predecessor: Angus MacDonald
- Successor: Andrew McDonald
- Previous post: Bishop of Dunkeld (1890–1900)

Orders
- Ordination: 31 May 1866 by Costantino Patrizi Naro
- Consecration: 28 October 1890 by William Smith

Personal details
- Born: 18 October 1841 Edinburgh, Scotland
- Died: 24 November 1928 (aged 87) Edinburgh, Scotland
- Education: Pontifical Scots College
- Motto: Suaviter et recta

James Augustine Smith (1841–1928) was a Roman Catholic bishop who served as the Archbishop of St. Andrews and Edinburgh in Scotland from 1900 to 1928.

== Life ==
Born in Edinburgh on 18 October 1841, he was educated at Blairs College and then the Scots College, Rome. He was ordained a priest on 31 March 1866 and returned to Scotland later that year. He was assistant in St Mary's, Dundee and then a professor at Blairs from 1867. From 1872 to 1890, he was the compiler of the Scottish Ordo and editor of the Scottish Catholic Directory. In 1885, Upon the erection of the Cathedral Chapter of St Andrews and Edinburgh, he was named Canon Theologian.

He was appointed the Bishop of Dunkeld by the Holy See on 14 August 1890, and consecrated to the Episcopate on 28 October 1890 at St Andrew's Cathedral, Dundee. The principal consecrator was Archbishop William Smith, and the principal co-consecrators were Bishop John McLachlan and Bishop (later Archbishop) Angus MacDonald. He was translated to the Archdiocese of St. Andrews and Edinburgh as archbishop on 30 August 1900. He died in office at Edinburgh on 25 November 1928, aged 87.

Catholic Church titles
Preceded by George Rigg	Bishop of Dunkeld; 1890–1900	Succeeded by Angus MacFarlane
Preceded by Angus MacDonald	Archbishop of St. Andrews and Edinburgh; 1900–1928	Succeeded by Andrew Thomas McDonald
