= Dundee Cathedral =

Dundee Cathedral may refer to the following cathedrals in Dundee, Scotland:

- St Andrew's Cathedral, Dundee, Catholic
- St Paul's Cathedral, Dundee, Episcopal
