= William Hart (bishop) =

Scottish Roman Catholic clergyman

The Right Reverend William Andrew Hart
- Bishop Emeritus of Dunkeld
- Church: Roman Catholic Church
- Diocese: Dunkeld
- Appointed: 27 May 1955
- Term ended: 26 January 1981
- Predecessor: James Scanlan
- Successor: Vincent Logan

Orders
- Ordination: 25 May 1929 by Remigio Gandásegui
- Consecration: 21 September 1955 by Donald Campbell

Personal details
- Born: 9 September 1904 Dumbarton, Dunbartonshire, Scotland
- Died: 18 October 1992 (aged 88) Dundee, Angus, Scotland
- Buried: Balgay Cemetery
- Parents: Daniel Hart and Margaret Hart (née Gallagher)
- Education: Royal Scots College

William Andrew Hart (9 September 1904 – 18 October 1992) was a Scottish Roman Catholic clergyman who served as the Bishop of Dunkeld from 1955 to 1981.

== Biography ==
Born in Dumbarton, Scotland on 9 September 1904, he was educated at St Mary's College, Blairs 1919-1922 and the Royal Scots College, Valladolid (1922–29). He was ordained to the priesthood on 25 May 1929 at Valladolid Cathedral for Glasgow Archdiocese. He was curate of St Mary's, Hamilton (1929–33) and St John's, Gorbals (1933–39). He served as a forces chaplain from 1939 to 1945 and was curate of St Michael's, Parkhead (1945–48). He was Vice-rector of the Royal Scots College, Valladolid (1948–49). He returned to Scotland in 1949 as parish priest of St Nicholas', Glasgow. He was parish priest of St Saviour's, Govan (1951–55).

He was appointed the Bishop of the Diocese of Dunkeld by the Holy See on 27 May 1955, and consecrated to the Episcopate on 21 September 1955. The principal consecrator was Archbishop Donald Alphonsus Campbell of Glasgow, and the principal co-consecrators were Bishop James Black of Paisley and Bishop Joseph Michael McGee of Galloway. He attended all four sessions of the Second Vatican Council (1962 –65).

He retired on 26 January 1981 and assumed the title Bishop Emeritus of Dunkeld. He died on 18 October 1992, aged 88.

Catholic Church titles
Preceded by James Donald Scanlan	Bishop of Dunkeld; 1955–1981	Succeeded by Vincent Paul Logan
