= Andrew McKenzie (bishop) =

The Right Reverend Andrew McKenzie
- Bishop of Dunkeld
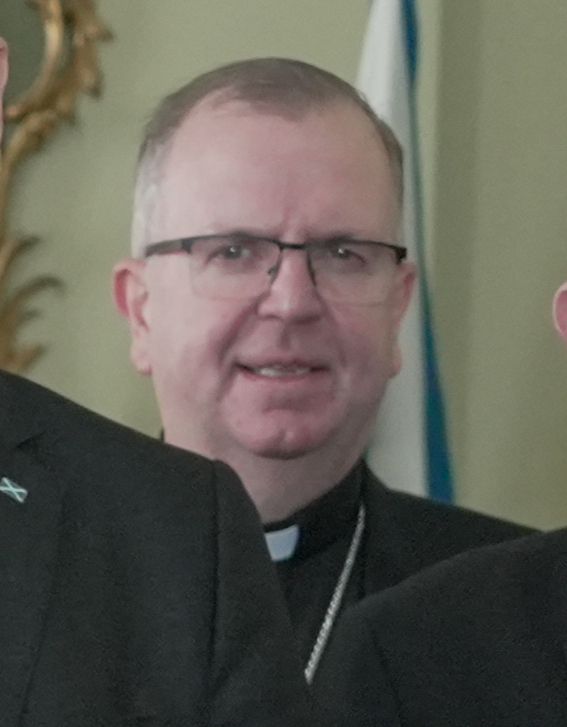
- McKenzie in 2024
- Church: Roman Catholic Church
- Diocese: Dunkeld
- Appointed: 27 May 2024
- Installed: 10 August 2024
- Predecessor: Martin Chambers

Orders
- Ordination: 31 October 1988 by Thomas Winning
- Consecration: 10 August 2024 by Leo Cushley

Personal details
- Born: 14 October 1964 (age 61) Glasgow, Scotland
- Denomination: Roman Catholicism
- Education: Saint John's University; Chesters College; St Peter's College, Newlands

Andrew McKenzie (born 14 October 1964) is a Scottish Roman Catholic bishop. He was appointed Bishop of Dunkeld on 27 May 2024 and was ordained a bishop on 10 August 2024.

== Biography ==
Born in Glasgow on 14 October 1964, he attended Our Lady of the Rosary Primary and Lourdes Secondary School. He commenced studies for the priesthood at St Peter's College, Newlands, and then at Chesters College, and was ordained on the 31 October 1988 for the Archdiocese of Glasgow.

He was assistant priest at St Michael's, Dumbarton and chaplain to Our Lady and St Patrick's High School (1988–94); and then assistant priest at Holy Cross, Croy, chaplain to St Ninian's High School, Kirkintilloch and St Maurice's High School, Cumbernauld. He then completed further studies in liturgy at Saint John's University, Collegeville (1996–98). He was assistant priest at St Andrew's Cathedral, Glasgow (1998–99) and was a on the staff of Scotus College (1999–2004). He continued as a visiting lecturer (2004–09), and was director of Priests for Scotland (2004–12). He was parish priest of St Joseph's, Tollcross, Glasgow (2012–22), and administrator of St Joachim's, Carmyle (2013–22). In 2017, he was named a Canon of Glasgow, and became administrator of St Andrew's Cathedral in 2022.

He was appointed as the Bishop of Dunkeld on 27 May 2024, in succession to the late Father Martin Chambers, and had died prior to his ordination as a bishop. His Lordship, Bishop McKenzie, was ordained bishop Saturday 10 August 2024.

Catholic Church titles
Preceded by Martin Chambers	Bishop of Dunkeld; 2024 to present	Incumbent
