= Robert Fraser (bishop) =

Scottish Roman Catholic bishop

The Right Reverend Robert Fraser
- Bishop of Dunkeld
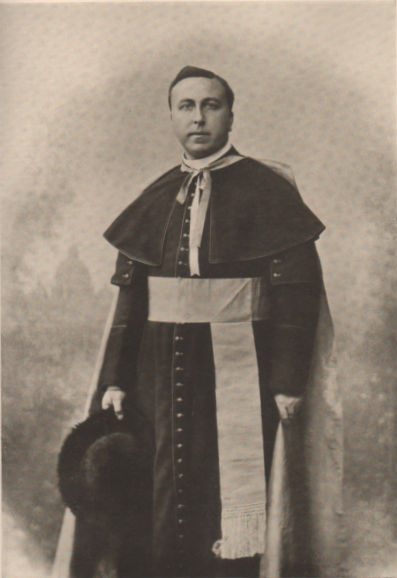
- Church: Roman Catholic Church
- Diocese: Dunkeld
- Appointed: 14 May 1913
- Term ended: 28 March 1914
- Predecessor: Angus MacFarlane
- Successor: John Toner

Orders
- Ordination: 13 August 1882
- Consecration: 25 May 1913 by Rafael Merry del Val

Personal details
- Born: 10 August 1858 Kennethmont, Aberdeenshire, Scotland
- Died: 28 March 1914 (aged 55) Dundee, Angus, Scotland
- Buried: Balgay Cemetery

Robert Fraser (10 August 1858 – 28 March 1914) was a Scottish Roman Catholic bishop who served as the Bishop of Dunkeld from 1913 to 1914.

== Life ==
Born in Kennethmont, Aberdeenshire, Scotland on 10 August 1858, he was educated at the junior seminary St Mary's College, Blairs, St. Edmund's in Douai, and the Scots College, Rome. He was ordained to the priesthood on 13 August 1882. He served as a professor at Blairs from 1883 to 1897, when he was appointed rector of the Scots College, a post he held until 1913. Fraser wrote the article on the "Scots College" for the Catholic Encyclopedia.

Fraser was made a domestic prelate in 1898, and a Protonotary apostolic in 1904. He was appointed the Bishop of the Diocese of Dunkeld by the Holy See on 14 May 1913, and consecrated to the Episcopate on 25 May 1913. The principal consecrator was Cardinal Rafael Merry del Val y Zulueta, and the principal co-consecrators were Archbishop Thomas Francis Kennedy, Rector of the Pontifical North American College and Donald Aloysius Mackintosh, Coadjutor Archbishop of Glasgow.

He died in office on 28 March 1914, aged 55.

Catholic Church titles
Preceded by Angus MacFarlane	Bishop of Dunkeld; 1913–1914	Succeeded by John Toner
