= Vincent Logan =

Scottish Catholic bishop (1941–2021)

The Right Reverend Vincent Logan
- Bishop of Dunkeld
- Church: Roman Catholic
- Appointed: 26 January 1981
- Term ended: 30 June 2012
- Predecessor: William Hart
- Successor: Stephen Robson

Orders
- Ordination: 14 March 1964 by Gordon Gray
- Consecration: 26 February 1981 by Gordon Gray

Personal details
- Born: Vincent Paul Logan; 30 June 1941 Bathgate, West Lothian, Scotland
- Died: 14 January 2021 (aged 79) Monifieth, Angus, Scotland
- Motto: Verbum Dei proclamare

Vincent Paul Logan (30 June 1941 – 14 January 2021) was the ninth bishop of the Roman Catholic Diocese of Dunkeld, which was restored (with boundaries differing from those of the pre-Reformation diocese) by Pope Leo XIII on 4 March 1878. Until his resignation Bishop Logan was one of eight serving Catholic bishops in Scotland.

== Biography ==
Vincent Logan was born in Bathgate, West Lothian on 30 June 1941, the second youngest of five brothers. As was common at the time, the young Vincent entered the junior seminary of St Mary's College at Blairs, near Aberdeen, where he completed his secondary education. His post-secondary education was at St Andrew's College, Drygrange, near Melrose in the Scottish Borders, before being ordained to the Catholic priesthood on 14 March 1964 to serve in the Archdiocese of St Andrews and Edinburgh.

Father Logan served in several parishes, eventually being appointed Vicar Episcopal for Religious Education in the Archdiocese. Father Logan was nominated as bishop by his mentor, Cardinal Gordon Gray. When, on 26 February 1981, he received episcopal consecration at Saint Andrew's Cathedral in Dundee, Bishop Logan was only 39 years of age and as such one of the youngest Catholic bishops in the world. The bishop announced in 2010 that he would be retiring at sixty nine years of age due to ill health and feeling unable to continue to with a fully active ministry. Pope Benedict XVI accepted his resignation as Bishop of Dunkeld on 6 July 2012.

He died on 14 January 2021, from COVID-19 in Monifieth during the COVID-19 pandemic in Scotland.

Catholic Church titles
| Preceded by William Andrew Hart | Bishop of Dunkeld; 1981–2012 | Succeeded by Stephen Robson |
