= John Toner (bishop) =

Scottish Roman Catholic clergyman

The Right Reverend John Toner
- Bishop of Dunkeld
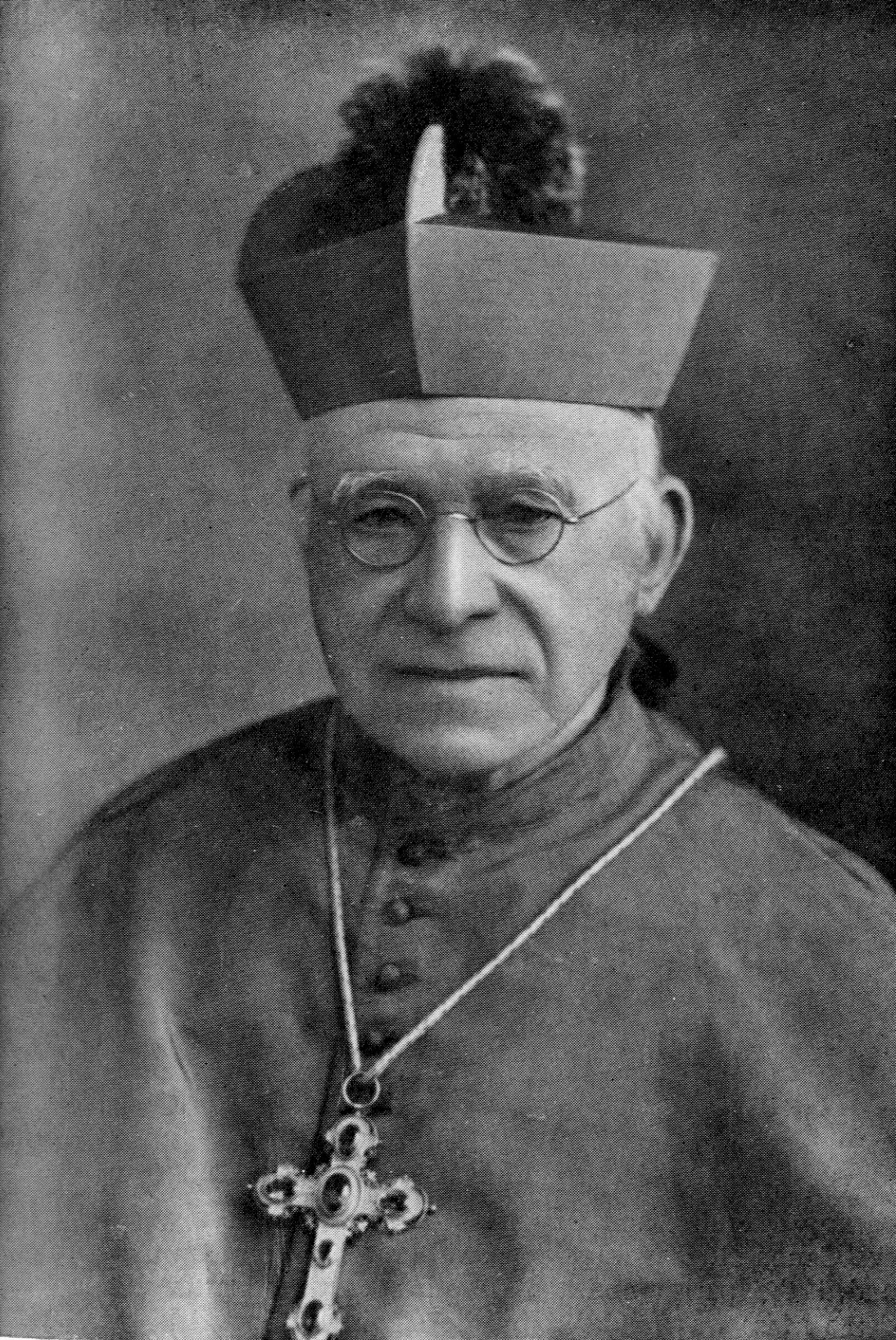
- Church: Roman Catholic
- Diocese: Dunkeld
- Appointed: 8 September 1914
- Term ended: 31 May 1949
- Predecessor: Robert Fraser
- Successor: James Donald Scanlan

Orders
- Ordination: 25 March 1882
- Consecration: 15 October 1914 by James August Smith

Personal details
- Born: 14 March 1857; Glasgow, Lanarkshire, Scotland
- Died: 31 May 1949 (aged 92); Dundee, Angus, Scotland
- Buried: Balgay Cemetery, Dundee
- Parents: William Toner; Elizabeth Toner (née Nixon)
- Motto: Solo Dios basta

John Toner (14 March 1857 – 31 May 1949) was a Scottish Roman Catholic clergyman who served as the Bishop of Dunkeld from 1914 to 1949.

== Biography ==
Born in Glasgow, Scotland on 14 March 1857, he was educated at Blairs College from 1871 to 1875 and the Royal Scots College, Valladolid from 1875 to 1882. He was ordained to the priesthood on 25 March 1882 in Palencia for the Archdiocese of Glasgow. He was curate of St Laurence, Greenock from 1882 to 1887 and returned to Blairs College as a professor from 1887 to 1890. He was parish priest of St Michael's, Parkhead from 1890 to 1897 and St Patrick's, Anderston from 1897 to 1901. From 1901 to 1914 he was parish priest of St Columbkille's, Rutherglen. He was named Canon of Glasgow in 1902.

Canon Toner was appointed Bishop of the Diocese of Dunkeld by the Holy See on 8 September 1914, and consecrated to the Episcopate on 15 October 1914. The principal consecrator was James August Smith, Archbishop of St Andrews and Edinburgh and the principal co-consecrators were Donald Aloysius Mackintosh, Coadjutor Archbishop of Glasgow and James William McCarthy, Bishop of Galloway.

He died in office on 31 May 1949, aged 92.

Catholic Church titles
Preceded by Robert Fraser	Bishop of Dunkeld; 1914–1949	Succeeded by James Donald Scanlan
