= St Saviour's Roman Catholic High School =

Defunct Catholic school in Dundee, Scotland

Coordinates: 56.4839°N 2.9179°W

St Saviour's RC High School was a state secondary school in Dundee, Scotland. It was a denominational school within the Catholic religious tradition, although it welcomed pupils from all religious backgrounds. The school closed in June 2008 and merged with Lawside Academy.

== History ==
St Saviour's was built in the 1970s at the east side of Dundee, opening at Christmas 1973. It remained a popular and thriving school for many years, producing such success stories as pop Band Danny Wilson 80s top ten hit Mary's Prayer fame, chess Grand Master Paul Motwani, Liz Lynch World and Olympic track athlete, Commonwealth Games Gold medal winner Gary Valentine, Gary Timmons, Christiaan van der Kuyl, all of whom who remained closely associated with the school until its closure.

On 27 June 2008, St Saviour's closed and merged with Lawside Academy to create a new school named St Pauls RC Academy. The building which once was St Saviour's was temporarily named as the Drumgeith Road Campus of St Paul's, as the new school building was still under construction until January 2009.

== Demolition ==
It was announced on 8 October 2009, that St Saviour's would be demolished after Dundee City Council pulled out of plans to use the building to house their IT Department.

== School Badge ==
The school badge consisted of a crucifix with a crown at the bottom. Underneath in Latin read "Per Crucem Ad Lucem" which translates into "Through the Cross to Enlightenment".

== Notable former pupils ==
- Liz McColgan MBE - Athlete
- Paul Motwani - Scotland's First Chess Grand Master
- Ray McKinnon, footballer. Played for Dundee United, Nottingham Forest, Aberdeen. Managed Raith Rovers and Dundee United.
