= St Mary, Our Lady of Victories Church, Dundee =

St Mary's Church
- St Mary, Our Lady of Victories Church
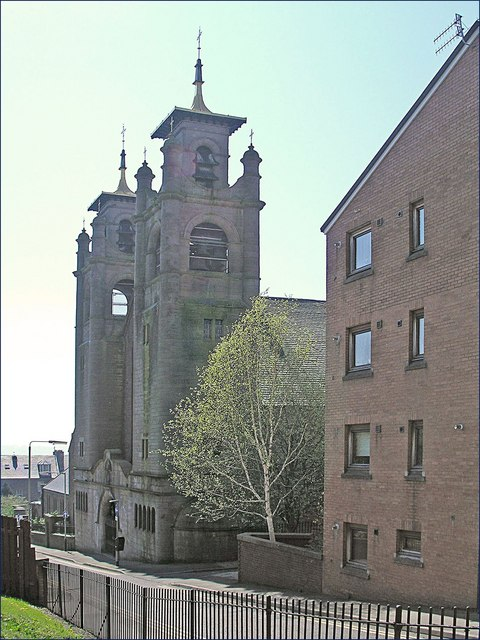
- Forebank Road
- St Mary's Church
- 56.4671°N 2.9707°W
- Location: Dundee
- Country: Scotland
- Denomination: Roman Catholic
- Website: SPSMblog.wordpress.com

History
- Status: Parish church
- Dedication: Our Lady of Victory
- Events: Towers added in 1901

Architecture
- Functional status: Active
- Heritage designation: Category B listed
- Designated: 4 February 1965
- Style: Romanesque Revival
- Groundbreaking: 1850
- Completed: 1851

Administration
- Province: St Andrews and Edinburgh
- Diocese: Dunkeld
- Deanery: St Mary, Dundee

St Mary, Our Lady of Victories Church is Roman Catholic Parish Church in Dundee, Scotland. It was built from 1850 and opened in 1851, twenty-seven years before the Restoration of the Scottish hierarchy. It is situated on Forebank Road, close to Ann Street. It is a Romanesque Revival church and a category B listed building.

== History ==
=== Construction ===
Building work started on the church in 1850. In 1851, it was opened. The architect for the church was George Mathewson. He designed it to be in the style of Byzantine-Romanesque architecture.

=== Developments ===
From 1900 to 1901, the two towers and a narthex were added to the front of the church. They were designed by Thomas Martin Cappon and built by William G. Lamond in the Art Nouveau style. In 1926, additions were made to the church, these were designed by Reginald Fairlie. These additions included multiple side chapels.

== Parish ==
The church also serves St Patrick's Church in the city. St Patrick's Church is situated on Arthurstone Terrace in the Stobswell area of the city, built from 1897 to 1899, was also designed by Thomas Martin Cappon and is a category B listed building. St Patrick's has one Sunday Mass at 9:30am.

St Mary's Church has one Sunday Mass at 11:15am.

== See also ==
- Roman Catholic Diocese of Dunkeld
