= Angus MacDonald (bishop) =

Scottish Roman Catholic priest (1844-1900)

The Most Reverend Angus MacDonald
- Archbishop of St Andrews and Edinburgh
- Church: Roman Catholic Church
- Archdiocese: St Andrews and Edinburgh
- Appointed: 15 July 1892
- Term ended: 29 April 1900
- Predecessor: William Smith
- Successor: James Smith
- Previous post: Bishop of Argyll and the Isles 1878–1892

Orders
- Ordination: 7 July 1872 (Priest)
- Consecration: 23 May 1878 (Bishop) by Charles Eyre

Personal details
- Born: 18 September 1844 Borrodale, Isle of Skye, Scotland
- Died: 29 April 1900 (aged 55) Edinburgh, Scotland
- Parents: Angus MacDonald and Mary MacDonald (née Watson)
- Education: University of London

Angus MacDonald (18 September 1844 – 29 April 1900) was a Scottish Roman Catholic priest, who later served as the first Bishop of Argyll and the Isles from 1878 to 1892 and as the third Archbishop of St. Andrews and Edinburgh from 1892 to 1900. In addition to his role in building new church buildings, parochial schools, and other institutions after almost three centuries of religious persecution of the Catholic Church in Scotland, Archbishop MacDonald is most notable for his leadership role in the Highland Land League agitation as Bishop of Argyll and the Isles. The Bishop embraced this role in order to end the absolute power of the Anglo-Scottish landlord class to profit through rackrenting and the Highland Clearances on their estates, and to improve the living standards of the laity during a time when he led "the most impoverished Diocese in Britain."

== Early life ==
Born in Borrodale on the Isle of Skye on 18 September 1844, he was the third son of Angus MacDonald and Mary MacDonald (née Watson). His elder brother was Hugh MacDonald, Bishop of Aberdeen. Angus MacDonald was educated at St Cuthbert's College, Ushaw. Afterwards, he graduated from the University of London with a Bachelor of Arts.

== Priestly career ==
After his ordination to the priesthood on 7 July 1872, he was first stationed at St Patrick's Church, Anderston, Glasgow, then sent to Arisaig, Inverness-shire to help the aged Father William Mackintosh, at whose death he took charge of that parish. There he laboured among the people he had known from childhood, his knowledge of Gaelic enabling him to instruct and help those and there were a great many of them who neither understood nor spoke English.

== Episcopal career ==
Just after the Scottish Hierarchy was restored on 15 March 1878, he was appointed the first bishop of the Diocese of Argyll and the Isles by the Holy See on 22 March 1878. He was consecrated to the episcopate by Archbishop Charles Petre Eyre of Glasgow on 23 May 1878, with Bishop James Chadwick of Hexham & Newcastle and Bishop John MacDonald of Aberdeen serving as co-consecrators. He took up his residence at St Columba's Cathedral in Oban, where he devoted himself to rebuilding the Catholic Church after centuries of religious persecution throughout his new and scattered diocese, which he regularly visited in all seasons and in all kinds of weather.

At the time, Oban was overwhelmingly Gaelic-speaking, but religiously Presbyterian and Episcopalian. Catholics were a tiny minority and anti-Catholicism was so intense that Bishop MacDonald is said to have needed an armed bodyguard to safely stroll around Oban during his first years there. The Diocesan See, however, had been placed in Oban anyway, because Oban was, according to the 1882 Ordnance Gazetteer of Scotland, "the capital of the West Highlands and the Charing Cross of the Hebrides."

He became a familiar sight on the Highland steamboats, often clad in oilskin and sou'wester. He built churches and schools, and, with his priests, worked incessantly for the glory of God and the increase of the religion to which he and his ancestors had always adhered. While rebuilding churches where excessive rents, religious discrimination, political bossism, and the Highland Clearances by the Anglo-Scottish landowning gentry had already made the See of Argyll and the Isles, "the most impoverished Diocese in Britain", Bishop MacDonald also cared very deeply, as he once wrote, about working, "to obtain redress for the people", during the same era as the Highland Land League agitation.

In May 1883, Bishop MacDonald wrote a letter to the Crofter's Commission from the Oban Rectory he shared with the famous Scottish Gaelic poet Fr. Allan MacDonald, "I refer to the way in which the Catholics (i.e. the great bulk of the population) of South Uist and Barra have been dealt with in educational matters, in being refused Catholic teachers in schools attended almost exclusively by Catholic children... I believe that a statement of this case will show the existence of a widespread evil, in the dependent and downgrading position in which such tenants are apt to be placed - with no security of tenure, no guarantee against removal at will, and with the fear constantly hanging over them, that if they assert their rights they may be made to suffer for it, without having power to obtain redress... In other Catholic districts on the mainland, Catholics had their feeling invariably respected by [school] boards composed mainly of non-Catholic members. Here [in the Islands], where they could have by their votes secured a majority of seats and then looked after their own interests, they were deterred by fear from exercising that right."

According to Roger Hutchinson, the Bishop's choice to assign Gaelic-speaking priests from the Scottish mainland to parishes in the Hebrides was accordingly no accident. About that time, when the Bishop and his priests, similarly to Irish priests during the Repeal Campaign, the Tithe War and the Land War, were the leaders of direct action, rent strikes, and other acts of resistance to the Anglo-Scottish landlords, Fr. Michael MacDonald has since commented, "I think that one of the things that may have influenced the boldness of the priests at that time was simply that they had no relations on the islands who could have been got at by the estate Factor or others."

Roger Hutchinson further writes that the hostility of Bishop MacDonald and his priests to the absolute power granted to the landlords under Scots property law at the time, which Hutchinson inaccurately labels as Liberation Theology rather than Distributism, was fueled by a deep sense of outrage over the decimation of the Catholic population of the Scottish Gaeldom by the Highland Clearances. A further influence was the knowledge that the roots of the Clearances lay in the Classical Liberalism preached in Adam Smith's The Wealth of Nations during the Scottish Enlightenment and in that ideology's hostility to, "bigotry and superstition"; which were, in 18th- and 19th-century Scotland, routinely used as shorthand for Roman Catholicism.

After 14 years as Bishop of Argyll and the Isles, he was translated to the Metropolitan see of St Andrews and Edinburgh on 15 July 1892. His replacement as Bishop of Argyle and the Isles was George Smith. John Lorne Campbell, however, has subtly criticized the Vatican's decision to appoint Bishop Smith to an overwhelmingly Gaelic-speaking Diocese. This is because Bishop Smith, a native of Banffshire, was "a successor who, although a man of holy personality, knew no Gaelic."

As Archbishop and Primate of Scotland, MacDonald continued with the same zeal, humility, gentleness, tact, and firm attention to everything in his new duties as he had had under his old charge.

He died in office on 29 April 1900, aged 55.

Catholic Church titles
New title	Bishop of Argyll and the Isles; 1878–1892	Succeeded by George John Smith
Preceded by William Smith	Archbishop of St. Andrews and Edinburgh; 1892–1900	Succeeded by James August Smith
