= James McCarthy (bishop) =

The Right Reverend James McCarthy
- Bishop of Galloway
- Church: Roman Catholic Church
- Diocese: Galloway
- Appointed: 25 May 1914
- Term ended: 24 December 1943
- Predecessor: William Turner
- Successor: William Mellon

Orders
- Ordination: 4 May 1879
- Consecration: 9 June 1914 by Donald Aloysius Mackintosh

Personal details
- Born: 30 January 1853; Newcastle upon Tyne, Northumberland, England
- Died: 24 December 1943 (aged 90); Dumfries, Dumfries-shire, Scotland
- Motto: Adveniat regnum tuum

James William McCarthy (30 January 1853 – 24 December 1943) was a Roman Catholic clergyman who served as Bishop of Galloway in Scotland from 1914 to 1943.

== Biography ==
Born in Newcastle upon Tyne, England, on 30 January 1853, he was educated at St Mary's College, Blairs 1869-1872; Royal Scots College, Valladolid (1872–76) and St Peter's Seminary (1876–79). He was ordained to the priesthood in Glasgow on 4 May 1879. He was curate at Our Lady and St Margaret's, Kinning Park (1879–84) and parish priest of St John's, Port Glasgow (1884–99). He was parish priest of St Mary Immaculate, Pollokshaws (1899–1900) and administrator of St Andrew's Cathedral, Glasgow (1900–14).

He was appointed as Bishop of the Diocese of Galloway by the Holy See on 25 May 1914, and consecrated to the Episcopate on 9 June 1914. The principal consecrator was Donald Aloysius Mackintosh, Coadjutor Archbishop of Glasgow, and the principal co-consecrators were James August Smith, Archbishop of St Andrews and Edinburgh and John Joseph Keily, Bishop of Plymouth.

He died in office on 24 December 1943, aged 90.

Catholic Church titles
Preceded by William Turner	Bishop of Galloway; 1914–1943	Succeeded by William Henry Mellon
