= George Rigg =

Scottish Roman Catholic bishop

The Right Reverend George Rigg
- Bishop of Dunkeld
- Church: Roman Catholic
- Diocese: Dunkeld
- Appointed: 22 March 1878
- Term ended: 18 January 1887
- Successor: James Smith

Orders
- Ordination: 25 July 1838
- Consecration: 26 May 1878 by Edward Henry Howard

Personal details
- Born: 19 July 1814 Croghmore, Irongray, Scotland
- Died: 18 January 1887 (aged 72) Perth, Scotland

George Rigg (19 July 1814 – 18 January 1887) was a Scottish Roman Catholic bishop who served as the Bishop of Dunkeld from 1878 to 1887.

== Life ==
Born in Groghmore, Scotland, he was ordained to the priesthood on 25 July 1838. He was appointed the Bishop of the Diocese of Dunkeld by the Holy See on 22 March 1878, and consecrated to the Episcopate on 26 May 1878. The principal consecrator was Cardinal Edward Henry Howard, and the principal co-consecrators were Archbishop Walter Steins and Bishop Giovanni Jacovacci.

He died in office, aged 72.

Catholic Church titles
New creation	Bishop of Dunkeld; 1878–1887	Succeeded by James August Smith
