= Scotus College =

Former seminary in Bearsden, Glasgow, Scotland

Coordinates: 55.918839°N 4.345740°W

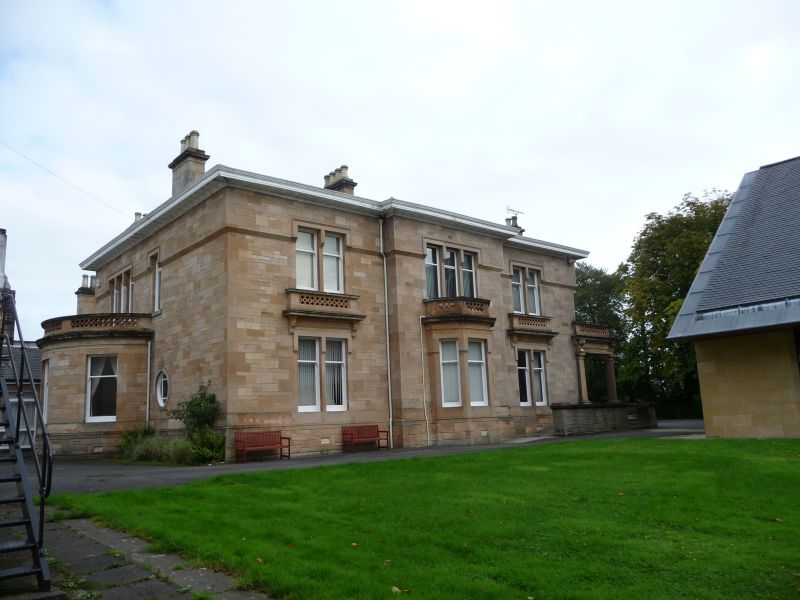
Exterior of the college with the chapel in the right of the picture.

Scotus College was a seminary in Bearsden, Glasgow. It was founded in 1985 under the name of Chesters College and in 1993 was reconstituted as Scotus College. It was then the only remaining Roman Catholic seminary in Scotland.

Its closure was announced in April 2009.

== History ==
=== St Peter's College, Newlands ===
In February 1980, the Archdiocese of Glasgow transferred its seminary from St Peter's Seminary, Cardross, because of maintenance difficulties, to the site of a former convent of the Franciscan Sisters of the Immaculate Conception in Newlands, Glasgow. It was also the site of the St Mungo centre, an ecumenical organisation. St Peter's College, Newlands remained there for four years, until November 1984 when it was closed and the students transferred to Bearsden. The old convent was renamed Merrylee House and later demolished to make space for a housing development. In 1997, further construction work was carried out on the site when additions and alterations were made to the chapel.

=== Chesters College ===
The building dates from 1955. The college site was purchased by the Roman Catholic Archdiocese of Glasgow in 1984 and opened in 1985 under the name of Chesters College. With the closure of Blairs College in 1986, it was to train men for the priesthood from all of the Scottish dioceses, except the Archdiocese of St Andrews and Edinburgh.

=== National Seminary ===
On 4 October 1993 it reopened as a seminary, or training college for the priesthood for all the dioceses, under the patronage of the Blessed John Duns Scotus, a philosopher-theologian of the High Middle Ages. In that role it replaced Gillis College, the seminary of the Archdiocese of St Andrews and Edinburgh, which closed as Scotus College was opening, making the college at Bearsden the National Seminary for Scotland. Thanks to its dedication, the college took the new name of "Scotus College". Scotus College was affiliated to Maynooth Pontifical University who accredited Diplomas and Degrees for Scotus College.

== Closure ==
In November 2002, a provisional decision was made to close the seminary by the Bishops' Conference of Scotland, but this was reversed shortly afterwards. In April 2009, it was announced that the college, the last Roman Catholic seminary in Scotland, would close because of a lack of students studying for the priesthood. The remaining nine students were transferred to The Pontifical Scots College in Rome.

== Present ==
The college site was put up for sale in 2009. In 2012, applications to demolish the buildings and build 28 homes on the site failed because it is in a conservation area. In August 2013, Westpoint Homes, a Glasgow building company, finished converting the site into housing. The chapel was demolished and replaced with apartments.
