= Borrodale =

Coordinates: 57.43°N 06.73°W

Borrodale: Scottish Gaelic: Borodail
- Location within the Isle of Skye
- OS grid reference: NG1648
- Council area: Highland
- Country: Scotland
- Sovereign state: United Kingdom
- Police: Scotland
- Fire: Scottish
- Ambulance: Scottish

Borrodale (Scottish Gaelic: Borodail) is small hamlet on the Isle of Skye, in the Inner Hebrides of Scotland.

Borrodale is part of Glendale and the Glendale Estate, in the parish of Duirinish. Borrodale is where the local primary school for Glendale was situated, until it closed in 2007 – it was the last of three local primaries that used to serve the area, although it had functioned as the only one since the 1950s. The other local schools were at Colbost and Borreraig.

This is not the area from where Charles Edward Stuart made his departure following the Battle of Culloden. This was at Borrodale Bay, on mainland Scotland, in the West Highlands near Arisaig.
