= Roman Catholic Diocese of Dunkeld =

Roman Catholic diocese in Scotland

Diocese of Dunkeld Dioecesis Dunkeldensis

Catholic
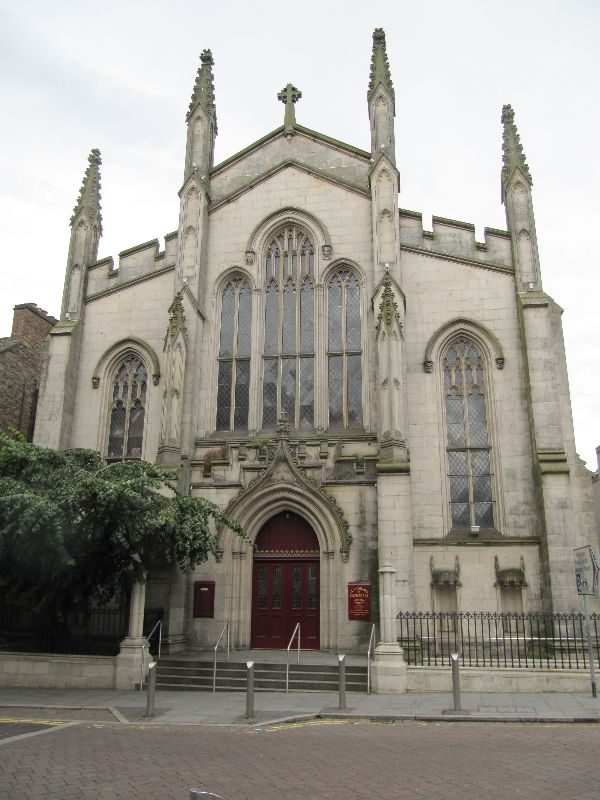
- St Andrew's Cathedral, Dundee

- Coat of arms

Location
- Country: Scotland
- Territory: City of Dundee and the council areas of Angus, most of Perth and Kinross, and parts of Stirling and Fife
- Ecclesiastical province: St Andrews and Edinburgh
- Metropolitan: St Andrews and Edinburgh
- Coordinates: 56.565°N 3.585°W

Statistics
- Area: 8,495 km^{2} (3,280 sq mi)
- Population: Total; Catholics: (as of 2021); 333,101; 63,260 (19%)
- Parishes: 44

Information
- Denomination: Roman Catholic
- Rite: Latin Rite
- Established: 5 March 1878
- Cathedral: St Andrew's Cathedral, Dundee
- Secular priests: 35

Current leadership
- Pope: Leo XIV
- Bishop: Andrew McKenzie
- Metropolitan Archbishop: Leo Cushley
- Vicar General: Kenneth J. McCaffrey
- Bishops emeritus: Stephen Robson

Map
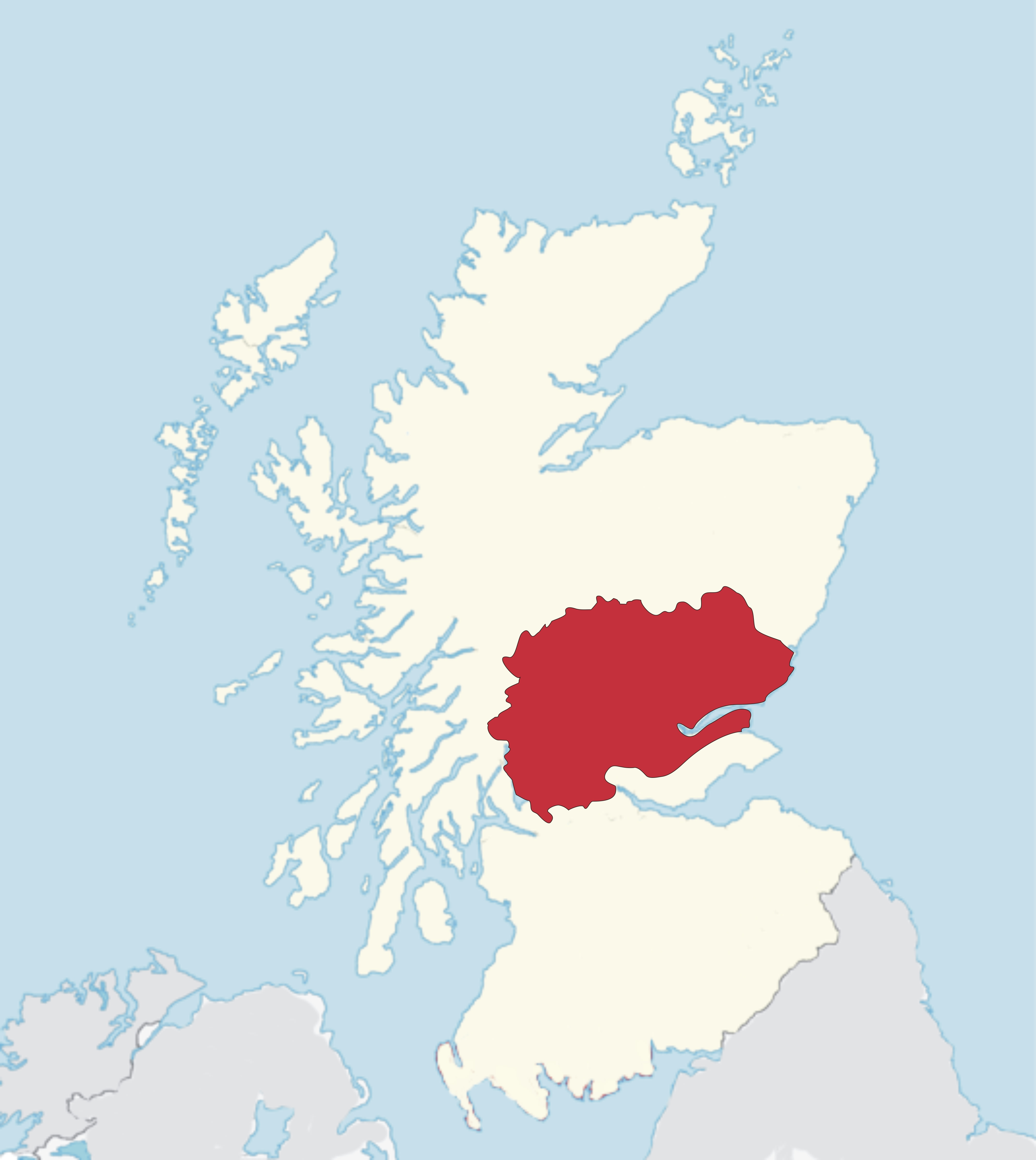

Website
- www.rcdod.org.uk

The Diocese of Dunkeld (Latin: Dioecesis Dunkeldensis) is a diocese of the Latin Church of the Catholic Church in southern Scotland. The current bishop of the diocese is Andrew McKenzie, having been appointed as the diocese's eleventh bishop on 27 May 2024.

== History ==
It is thought that the diocese was constituted as far back as the middle of the ninth century. The first occupant was styled Bishop of Fortriu, the name by which the kingdom of the northern Picts was then known. This bishop was also styled Abbot of Dunkeld, perhaps holding jurisdiction, formerly enjoyed by Iona, over the other Columban monasteries in Scotland.

In 1127 King Alexander, who had already founded the Diocese of Moray farther north, erected Dunkeld into a cathedral church and replaced the Columban monks by a chapter of secular canons. The new bishopric appears to have included a great part of what afterwards became the Diocese of Argyll, and retained its jurisdiction over various churches representing old Columban foundations. There were thirty-five bishops of Dunkeld from its foundation until the suppression of the Catholic hierarchy during the Protestant Reformation in the sixteenth century.

The Catholic Church restored the diocese on 4 March 1878, by decree of Pope Leo XIII. The cathedral chapter, erected in 1895, consisted of a provost and eight canons.

== Present day ==
Dunkeld is a suffragan see of the Archdioceese of St Andrews and Edinburgh, and includes the counties of Perth, Angus, Clackmannan, Kinross, and the northern part of Fife. In 2020 the diocese comprised 45 parishes of 43,000 Catholics from a total population of 400,000 (10.8%) served by 35 priests and 4 deacons. In area the diocese is 8,495 square kilometres (3,280 sq mi). The diocesan cathedral is dedicated to Saint Andrew and is located in Dundee rather than Dunkeld, Dundee being the residence of the majority of the Catholics of the diocese and the largest centre of population.

== Parishes ==
City of Dundee

- St Andrew's Cathedral, Nethergate, Dundee
- St Clements, Charleston
- St Columba's, Kirkton,
- Immaculate Conception, Lochee
- St Joseph's, Wilkie's Lane, Dundee
- Ss Leonard & Fergus, Ardler
- Our Lady of Victories, Hilltown, Forebank
- Our Lady of Good Counsel, Broughty Ferry
- Our Lady of Sorrows, Fintry
- St Ninian's, Menziehill
- St Patrick's, Stobswell, Dundee
- Ss Peter & Paul's, Coldside, Dundee
- St Pius X, Douglas, Dundee

Angus

- St Thomas of Canterbury, Arbroath
- St Ninian's, Brechin
- St Anne's, Carnoustie
- St Fergus’, Forfar
- St Anthony's, Kirriemuir
- St Bride's, Monifieth
- St Margaret's, Montrose

Clackmannanshire

- St Mungo's, Alloa
- St John Vianney's, Alva
- St Bernadette's, Tullibody

Fife

- St Matthew's, Auchtermuchty
- St Columba's, Cupar
- St Serf's, High Valleyfield
- St Fillan's, Newport-on-Tay
- Our Lady Star of the Sea, Tayport

Kinross-shire

St James’, Kinross

Perthshire and Stirlingshire

- Our Lady of Mercy, Aberfeldy
- St Luan's, Alyth
- Our Lady of Perpertual Succour, Auchterarder
- St Stephen's, Blairgowrie
- St Joseph the Worker, Callander
- St Margaret's, Comrie
- St Fillan's, Crieff
- St Mary's, Coupar Angus
- Ss Fillan's & Alphonsus, Doune, Stirling.
- The Holy Family, Dunblane, Stirling.
- St Columba's, Birnam
- Our Lady of Lourdes’, City of Perth
- St John the Baptist's, City of Perth
- St Mary's Monastery, Kinnoull
- St Mary Magdalene's, City of Perth
- St Bride's, Pitlochry

== Education ==
Due to the number of immigrants from Ireland during the 19th century, the see city of Dundee has always had a higher percentage of Catholics (between 18%-20%) than other cities and towns on the East Coast. As a result, since that time, there have been a good number of primary and secondary schools in the diocese. As of 2010, the Diocese website listed 21 primary schools and 4 secondary schools: two in Dundee (St. John's and St. Paul's), St John's Academy in Perth and Kilgraston School (an independent school) in Bridge of Earn some few miles south-east of Perth.

== Religious communities ==
There are 5 institutes of religious life for men: the Redemptorists who run a retreat centre at Kinnoull in Perth; the Pallotines at St. Joseph's, who serve the Polish community in Dundee; the Marian Franciscans, who offer Mass, in the Extraordinary Form, at the Lawside Covenant; the CST Fathers (Congregation of Saint Thérèse of Lisieux) (an Oriental rite foundation from India) in the parish of St. Clement of Rome; the SMA Fathers (Society of African Missions) in Dunblane and the Marist Brothers who teach. Within the diocese there are 7 institutes of religious life for women: the Columban Sisters, the Little Sisters of the Poor (left 2015), the Religious Sisters of Charity, the Servite Sisters, the Sisters of Mercy, the Society of the Sacred Heart and the Ursulines. These women are involved in a variety of ministries: teaching, administration, parish work and running a home for the elderly.

The Diocese also operates its own facility for elderly people: St. Mary's Home in Monifieth as well as a day care centre attached to the home.

In August 2015 the Little Sisters of the Poor, who had been resident at St. Joseph's, Wellburn for more than 150 years, announced that they could no longer continue to run their care home due to diminishing numbers of Sisters. The Diocese purchased the care home from the Sisters so that the care of the elderly mission at the home may continue. In 2015 a Care Home Manager was appointed to operate the facility on behalf of the Diocese, but given the age and condition of the premises, the home was closed in 2017.

== Bishops ==
=== Past and present ordinaries ===
(Modern Bishops are included in the above-mentioned main article, but are not the only part of post-Reformation bishops.)
The following is a list of the modern Bishops of Dunkeld:

- George Rigg (appointed 22 March 1878 – died 18 January 1887)
- James August Smith (appointed 14 August 1890 – translated to the Archdiocese of St Andrews and Edinburgh on 30 August 1900)
- Angus MacFarlane (appointed 21 February 1901 – died 24 September 1912)
- Robert Fraser (appointed 14 May 1913 – died 28 March 1914)
- John Toner (appointed 8 September 1914 – died 31 May 1949)
- James Donald Scanlan (succeeded 31 May 1949 – translated to the Diocese of Motherwell on 23 May 1955)
- William Andrew Hart (appointed 27 May 1955 – retired 26 January 1981)
- Vincent Paul Logan (appointed 26 January 1981 – resigned 30 June 2012)
- (Basil O'Sullivan apostolic administrator (appointed 6 July 2012 – resigned 11 December 2013))
- Stephen Robson (appointed 11 December 2013 – resigned 28 December 2022)
- Martin Chambers (appointed 2 February 2024 – died before installation, 10 April 2024)
- Andrew McKenzie (appointed 27 May 2024 – present)

=== Coadjutor Bishops ===
- James Maguire (1939–1944)
- James Donald Scanlan (1946–1949)

=== Other priests of this diocese who became bishops ===
- Joseph Michael McGee, appointed Bishop of Galloway in 1952
- Michael Foylan, appointed Bishop of Aberdeen in 1964

== See also ==
- Catholic Church in Scotland
- St Mary, Our Lady of Victories Church, Dundee
