= John McLachlan (bishop) =

Scottish Roman Catholic clergyman

The Right Reverend John McLachlan
- Bishop of Galloway
- Church: Roman Catholic Church
- Diocese: Galloway
- Appointed: 22 March 1878
- Term ended: 16 January 1893
- Successor: William Turner

Orders
- Ordination: 16 March 1850
- Consecration: 23 May 1878 by Charles Eyre

Personal details
- Born: 7 September 1826 Glasgow, Lanarkshire, Scotland
- Died: 16 January 1893 (aged 66) Dumfries, Dumfries-shire, Scotland
- Motto: Fortis et fidus

John McLachlan (7 September 1826 – 16 January 1893) was a Scottish Roman Catholic clergyman who served as the Bishop of Galloway from 1878 to 1893.

== Life ==
Born in Glasgow, Scotland on 7 September 1826, he was ordained to the priesthood in Rome on 16 March 1850. He was appointed the Bishop of the Diocese of Galloway by the Holy See on 22 March 1878, and consecrated to the Episcopate on 23 May 1878. The principal consecrator was Archbishop Charles Petre Eyre of Glasgow, and the principal co-consecrators were Bishop James Chadwick of Hexham and Newcastle and Bishop John MacDonald of Aberdeen.

He died in office on 16 January 1893, aged 66. His Pontifical Mass of Requiem was celebrated at St Andrew's Cathedral in Dumfries after which his coffin was borne to the vaults beneath the church.

Catholic Church titles
New creation	Bishop of Galloway; 1878–1893	Succeeded by William Turner
