= St Andrew's Cathedral, Dundee =

Coordinates: 56.4574°N 2.9748°W

St. Andrew's Cathedral
- St. Andrew's Cathedral, Dundee
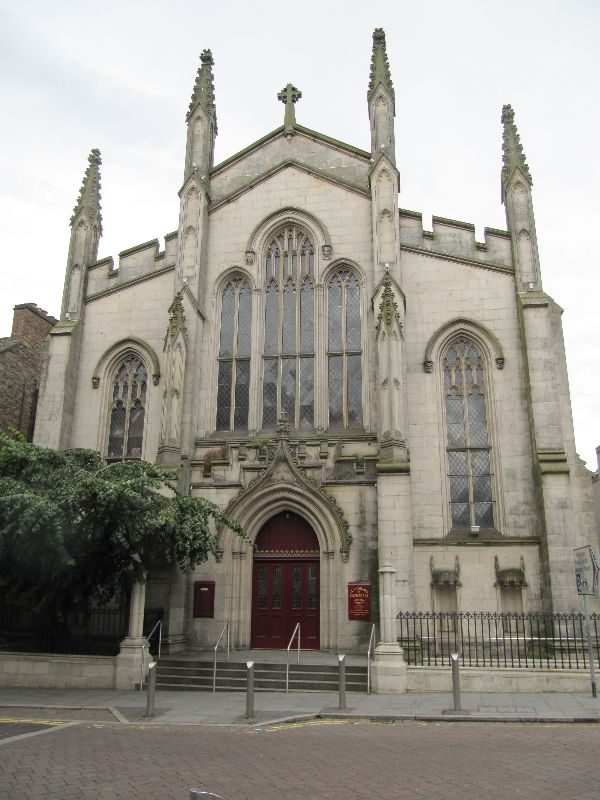
- Front entrance

- Shown within Dundee
- Location: Dundee
- Country: Scotland
- Denomination: Roman Catholic
- Website: standrewscathedral.com

Architecture
- Architect: George Mathewson
- Years built: 1836

Administration
- Province: St Andrews and Edinburgh
- Diocese: Dunkeld

Clergy
- Bishop: Andrew McKenzie
- Dean: Very Rev. Kevin Canon Golden

The Cathedral Church of St Andrew is a Catholic cathedral in the West End of the city of Dundee, Scotland. The cathedral is the seat of the Bishop of Dunkeld and mother church of the Diocese of Dunkeld within the Province of St Andrews and Edinburgh. The bishop, since may 2024, is Andrew McKenzie.

== History ==
The Cathedral sits at what was the western edge of the town's almshouse that survived until the sixteenth century.

The building, the facade of which is in the Victorian Gothic design, was designed by Dundee native architect George Mathewson. Opened on 7 August 1836, it is the oldest Catholic Church in Dundee, and has a seating capacity of about 1,000. The halls in the basement served for years as the only Catholic school in the city. The church was dedicated as a cathedral on 4 February 1923.

The sanctuary (presbyterium) area, which contains the high altar and stalls for the canons of the cathedral, was added later by knocking out the back wall and building on top of the clergy house. As a result, the altar area is significantly higher than the body of the cathedral. The cathedral is also unusual in that the floor slopes from the entrance to the entrance to the sanctuary.

== Interior ==
There are two side altars in the cathedral; one is dedicated to the Sacred Heart of Jesus and the other to Mary, the Mother of Jesus under her title of Our Lady of Perpetual Help. As in all Catholic churches, the cathedral has a set of the Stations of the Cross on the walls. In the vestibule there is a statue of the cathedral's patron saint, Saint Andrew. At the back of the cathedral is the baptistry next to which is a representation of the Pietà.

== Ministry ==
The usual Sunday Mass times at the cathedral are 11 am and 6 pm.
