= Blairs College =

Museum in Scotland

Coordinates: 57.098028°N 2.194735°W

Blairs Museum
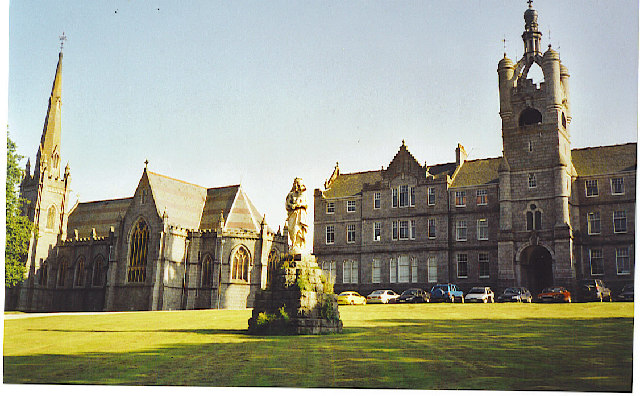
- Sunset at Blairs College in 2001
- Established: 1829
- Location: Blairs, Aberdeenshire, Scotland, United Kingdom
- Type: Catholic church
- Website: Official website

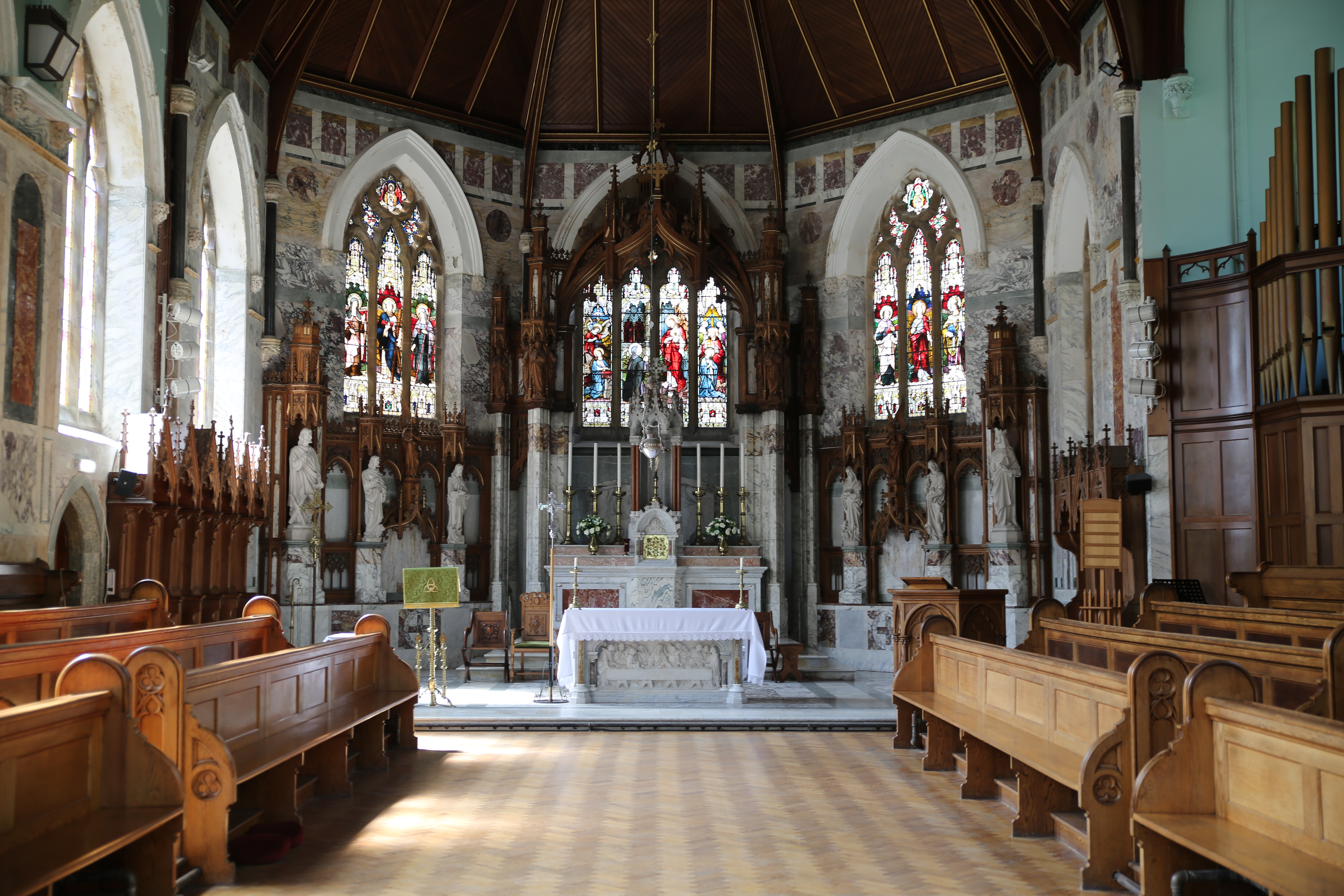
Inside St Mary's Chapel, Blairs. East facing

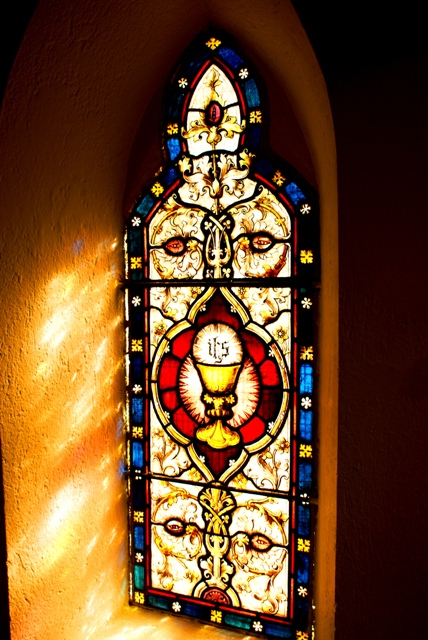
Stained-glass in Blairs College

St Mary's College, Blairs (commonly known as Blairs College), situated near Aberdeen in Scotland, was from 1829 to 1986 a junior seminary for boys and young men studying for the Roman Catholic priesthood. Part of the former college now houses Blairs Museum, the museum of Scotland's Catholic heritage. The New Chapel is a Category A listed building, with the other buildings listed as Category B.

== History ==
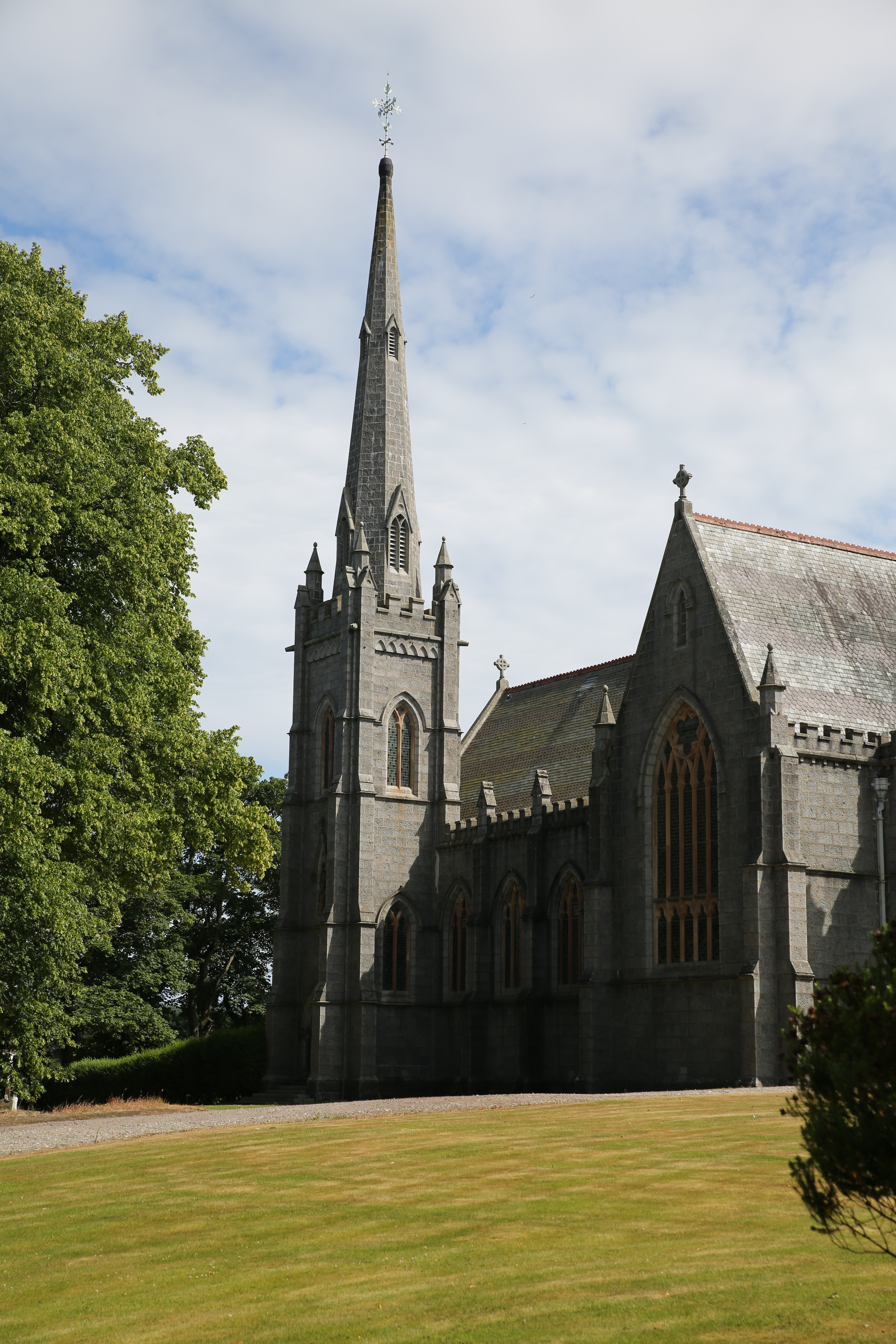
St Mary's Chapel, Blairs College

Lying on the south bank of the River Dee, between Kirkton of Maryculter and Aberdeen, the land on which the seminary was built was originally owned by the Knights Hospitallers of St John of Jerusalem, before passing to the Menzies family in 1542. In 1827 the land was donated by John Menzies of Pitfodfels (1756-1843) to the bishops of the Roman Catholic Church in Scotland, and the original building, Menzies House, converted into a seminary for 25 pupils. In 1829, Lismore Seminary and Aquhorthies College were merged, then closed and the students moved to Blairs College.

A major expansion was executed from 1897 to 1902 with a new chapel by Robert Curran of Warrington and new lectures rooms and accommodation by Robert Gordon Wilson of Aberdeen. The new buildings were formally opened by Bishop Chisholm on 23 September 1903.

The college's book collection is housed in Aberdeen University Library, and the archives at the Scottish Catholic Archives.

The college closed in 1986, but the chapel continued to be used as a place of worship. There was a Sunday Mass in the chapel every week at 9:30 a.m. In June 2022, it was announced that the chapel would close as a place of worship. A final decision was to be made by the end of September 2022.

- The college now homes Blairs Museum, a museum of Catholic History with significant collections of art relating to Mary, Queen of Scots, the Jacobites and the history of Catholicism in Scotland. The museum is open at weekends from April to September or by appointment.

== Notable former pupils ==
- Andrew Boyle (1919–1991), broadcaster, historian
- Robert Fraser (1858–1914) Bishop of the Roman Catholic Diocese of Dunkeld
- Sylvester McCoy, actor
- Fr. Allan MacDonald (1859–1904), priest, poet, and folklore collector in South Uist and Eriskay. A highly important figure in Scottish Gaelic literature.

== Notable Staff ==
- Edward Douglas, Bishop of Motherwell
- Peter Moran, Bishop of Aberdeen

Presidents

- Peter J. Grant, 1864–90
- Aeneas Chisholm, 1890–99

Rectors

- James McGregor, 1899–1928
- Francis Cronin, 1928–39
- Patrick McGonagle, 1939–47
- Gordon J. Gray, 1947–51
- Stephen McGill, 1951–60
- Francis S. W. Thomson, 1960–64
- Daniel P. Boyle PSS, 1965–67
- James Brennan, 1967–74
- Benjamin Donachie, 1974–80
- Keith P. O'Brien, 1980–85
- John McIntyre, 1985–86

== See also ==
- St. Peter's Seminary (Cardross)
