= Diocese of Aberdeen (disambiguation) =

The Diocese of Aberdeen is one of the thirteen (after 1633 fourteen) historical dioceses of the Scottish church.

Diocese of Aberdeen may also refer to:

- Roman Catholic Diocese of Aberdeen, modern Roman Catholic diocese resurrected in the late 19th century upon the model of the old diocese, and is based at Aberdeen
- Diocese of Aberdeen and Orkney, Scottish episcopal created in the 18th century on the model of two earlier dioceses combined, and based at Aberdeen
