= Aberdeen Cathedral =

Aberdeen Cathedral may refer to one of three cathedrals in Aberdeen, Scotland:

- St Andrew's Cathedral, Aberdeen, cathedral of Scottish Episcopal Diocese of Aberdeen and Orkney
- St Machar's Cathedral, original cathedral in Old Aberdeen, now a High Kirk of the Church of Scotland in the Presbytery of Aberdeen
- St Mary's Cathedral, Aberdeen, cathedral of the Roman Catholic Diocese of Aberdeen and see of the Bishop of Aberdeen
