= Aeneas Chisholm (vicar apostolic of the Highland District) =

British Roman Catholic bishop

The Right Reverend Aeneas Chisholm
- Vicar Apostolic of the Highland District
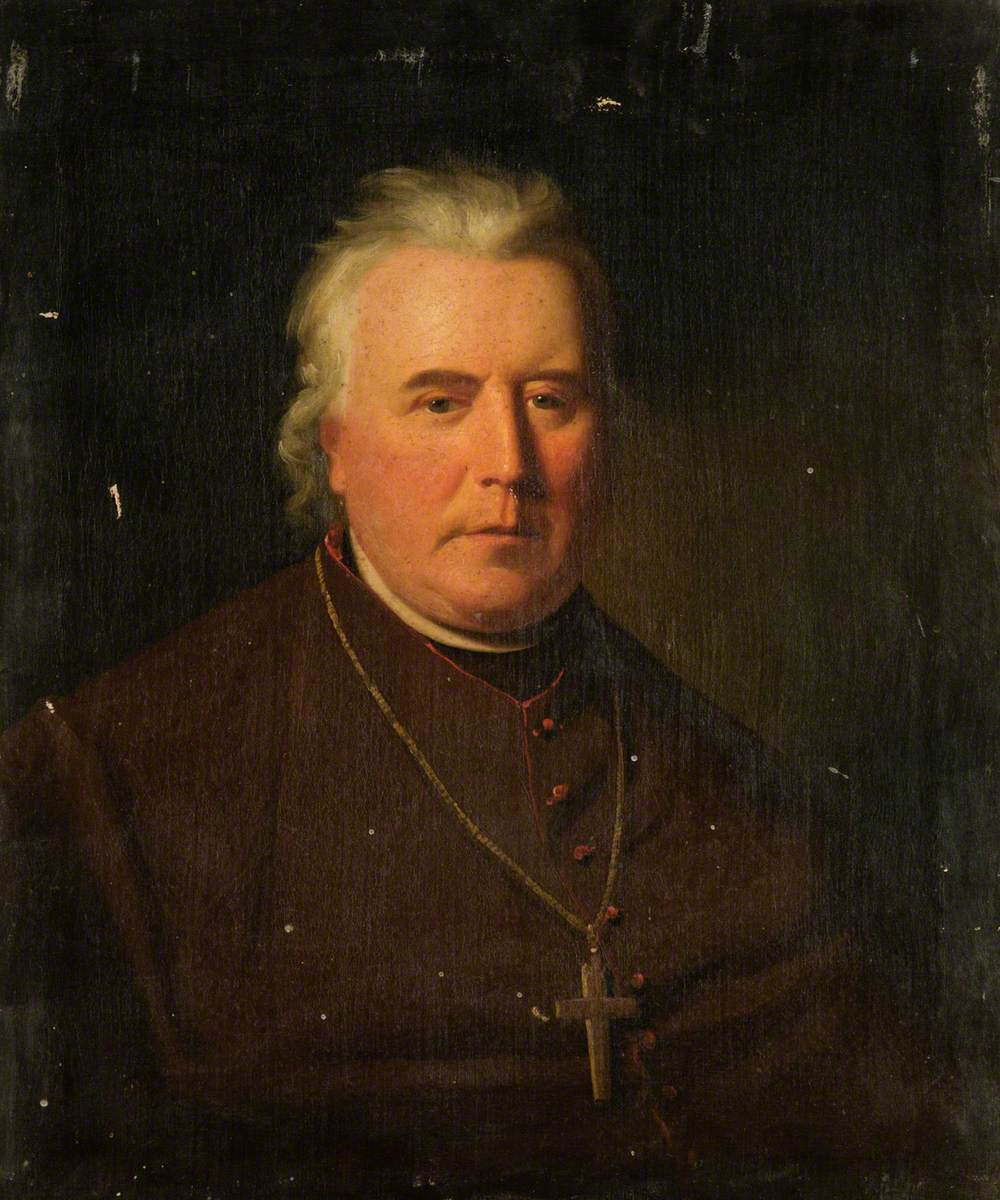
- Church: Roman Catholic
- In office: 1814–1818
- Predecessor: John Chisholm
- Successor: Ranald MacDonald
- Other post: Titular Bishop of Diocaesarea in Palaestina (1804–1818)
- Previous posts: Coadjutor Vicar Apostolic of the Highland District (1804–1814)

Orders
- Ordination: 1783
- Consecration: 15 September 1805 by Alexander Cameron

Personal details
- Born: 1759 Strathglass, Inverness-shire, Scotland
- Died: 31 July 1818 (aged 58–59) Lismore, Scotland

Aeneas Chisholm (1759–1818) was a Roman Catholic bishop who served as the Vicar Apostolic of the Highland District, Scotland.

== Life ==
Born in Strathglass, Inverness in 1759, he was ordained a priest in 1783. In 1786 he was nominated prefect of studies in the Scots College, Douai. There, he transcribed 119 royal letters. In 1789 he came home to the Catholic mission in Strathglass.

He was appointed the Coadjutor Vicar Apostolic of Highland District and Titular Bishop of Diocaesarea in Palaestina by the Holy See on 11 May 1804. He was consecrated to the Episcopate at the Lismore Seminary on 15 September 1805.

The principal consecrator was Bishop Alexander Cameron, Vicar Apostolic of the Lowland District. Following the death of his brother Bishop John Chisholm on 8 July 1814, Aeneas automatically succeeded as the Vicar Apostolic of Highland District.

He died at Lismore on 31 July 1818, aged 59 and is buried there.

Catholic Church titles
Preceded by John Chisholm	Vicar Apostolic of the Highland District; 1814–1818	Succeeded by Ranald MacDonald
