= Tiberiopolis =

Ancient city in Phrygia Pacatiana

- Location within Turkey
- 37°54′N 31°55′E

Tiberiopolis (Ancient Greek: Τιβεριούπολις; sometimes in sources, Tiberiapolis, and Pappa-Tiberiopolis; formerly Pappa) was a town in the Roman province of Phrygia Pacatiana, mentioned by Ptolemy, Socrates of Constantinople and Hierocles. At various times, it was considered as part of Phrygia, Isauria, and the late Roman province of Pisidia.

It struck its own coins at least from the time of Trajan.

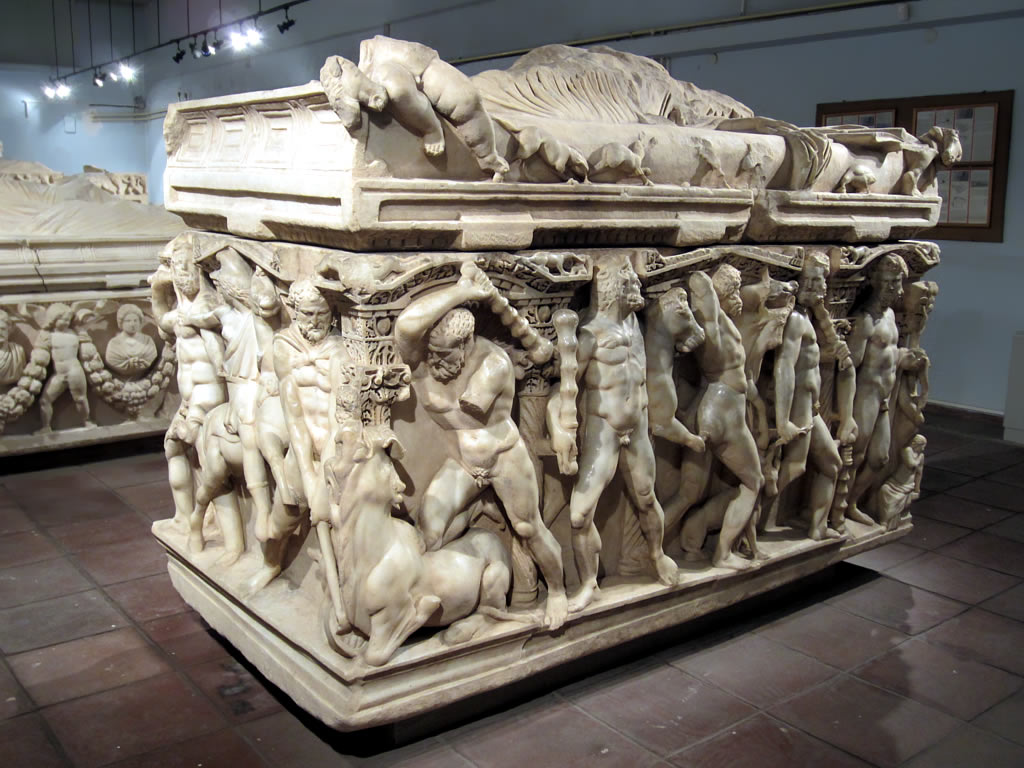
Roman Sarcophagus (2nd C AD)

It was situated at the modern village of Yunuslar, Beyşehir district, in Konya Province, Turkey. At Tiberiopolis the famous Roman sarcophagus showing the Twelve Labours of Hercules now displayed at the Konya Archaeological Museum was recovered.

It must have been Christianised at an early date. Nicephorus, a presbyter at Tiberiopolis was martyred in 361 or 362, and later canonized. His feast is celebrated on 28 November.

== Bishopric ==
=== Tiberiopolis ===
The bishopric of Tiberiopolis appears in the oldest Greek Notitiae episcopatuum among the suffragans of Laodicea in Phrygia, capital and metropolitan see of the late Roman province of Phrygia Pacatiana, but in the 8th century it was attached to Hierapolis in Phrygia, capital and metropolitan see of Phrygia Pacatiana Secunda, and as such appears in the Notitiae episcopatuum of the Ecumenical Patriarchate of Constantinople until the 13th century, when the area was overrun by the Seljuk Turks.

==== Bishops ====
Le Quien mentions five of its bishops known by their presence at councils:

- Eustathius at a synod in Constantinople (536);
- Silas at the Second Council of Constantinople (553);
- Anastasius at the Quinisext Council (692);
- Michael at the Second Council of Nicaea (787);
- Theoctistus at the Fourth Council of Constantinople (Eastern Orthodox) (879).

==== Roman Catholic titular see ====
Tiberiopolis remains a titular see in the Roman Catholic Church. Titular bishops have been:

- Thomas Williams (1725–1740), Vicar Apostolic of the Northern District
- John MacDonald (1761–1779), Vicar Apostolic of the Highland District
- Istvan Gosztonyi (1815–1817)
- Pablo García Abella (1827–1833), Bishop of Calahorra y La Calzada
- Gabriele Maria de Marchis (1834–1858)
- Michael Flannery (1858–1859), Bishop of Killaloe
- Pedro José Tordoya Montoya (1860–1875). Bishop of Cusco
- Eusebio Marie Semprini (1876–1893)
- Mariano Antonio Espinosa (1893–1898), Archbishop of Buenos Aires
- Antonio Scotti (1898–1919)
- Adalbero Joseph (Michael) Fleischer (1922–1963)
- Adolfo Rodríguez Herrera (1963–1964), Archbishop of Camagüey

=== Pappa ===
Under the name of Pappa, the town was also a bishopric of the province of Pisidia, and later a titular see of the Roman Catholic Church.
