= Lismore Seminary =

- Location on Lismore
- Location: Lismore, Argyll
- Country: Scotland
- Denomination: Roman Catholic

History
- Former name: Kilcheran House
- Status: Closed
- Founded: 1801
- Founder: Bishop John Chisholm

Architecture
- Functional status: Private House
- Heritage designation: Category B
- Designated: 20 July 1971
- Closed: 1829

Lismore Seminary was situated in Kilcheran House on the island of Lismore in the Inner Hebrides part of Argyll, Scotland. It served as a seminary for the Roman Catholic Church in Scotland in the 19th century. At the time it was the only seminary in the west of Scotland and for the Vicariate Apostolic of the Highland District. The house still stands and has a lime kiln from the time of the seminary within the grounds. Both the house and the kiln are category B listed sites.

== History ==
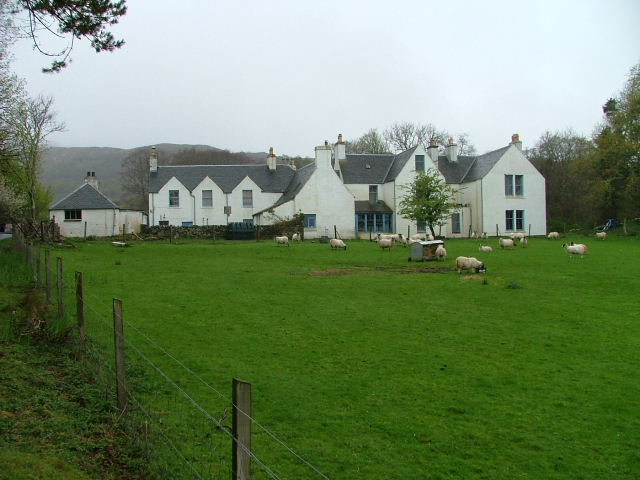
Samalaman House

Before the seminary moved to Lismore, Scottish seminarians were trained at Samalaman House near Loch Ailort. The house was previously owned by Bishop Alexander MacDonald. The seminary was there from 1783 to 1803. The number of students at the college was increasing but the site was quite a small place, cramped and uncomfortable, with leaking roofs and unsubstantial walls. So, from 1798, Bishop John Chisholm started to look for a larger and more suitable location.

In 1803, a property was found that cost £5,000 that had a large enough house and substantial gardens. Somehow the Vicariate was able to afford it. So, Bishop Chisholm founded the new seminary on the island of Lismore. The island was staunchly Presbyterian, and there must have been an unexpected feeling on the island when the inhabitants learned of a Catholic seminary being located in their vicinity.

Objections were also raised by Catholics in Scotland. Samalaman seminary was on the mainland and in an area occupied by Catholics, but the new seminary was on an island with no Catholic inhabitants. Bishop Chisholm dismissed these objections by saying that it was more "accessible here to the world than where I have formerly been at Moidart", and that "we never had more or so much liberty to apply ourselves to learning and spiritual matters in any other place".

In addition to founding the seminary, Bishop Chisholm also ordered the construction of a limestone kiln that was built so that the seminary could benefit from revenues made by a local quarry. The lime kiln made such a local impression that, 1814, when Sir Walter Scott visited the area, he wrote that:

We coasted the low, long and fertile island of Lismore where a Catholic bishop, Chisholm has established a seminary of young men intended for priests, and what is a better thing, a valuable lime work. Reports speak well of the lime, but indifferently of the progress of the students.

While Lismore seminary served the Vicariate Apostolic of the Highland District, Aquhorthies College in the east of Scotland served the Vicariate Apostolic of the Lowland District. In 1829, with the number of students increasing, it was decided to close both colleges and move the students to the larger St Mary's College, Blairs near Aberdeen.

== Preceding seminaries ==
The seminary at Samalaman was only the latest of a series of attempts made by the Vicariate Apostolic of the Highland District to have a permanent seminary for its students within Scotland. However, various bishops had to almost constantly move the seminaries. This was mainly because Catholic life in Scotland was so fraught and dangerous during the 18th century. Also, it was because of severe financial mismanagement of the funds allocated to the seminaries. This led to considerable stress amongst the Highland district priests and led to friction with their fellow Scottish Catholic Lowland district priests.

Seminary Name	Location	Opened	Closed	Co-ordinates
Eilean Ban	Loch Morar	1714	1716	56.963734°N 5.788277°W
Eilean Ban	Loch Morar	1732	1738	56.963734°N 5.788277°W
Guidal	Arisaig	1738	1746	56.893730°N 5.769517°W
Glenfinnan	Loch Shiel	1768	1770	56.870627°N 5.445362°W
Buorblach	Loch Morar	1770	1774	56.973784°N 5.831702°W
Buorblach	Loch Morar	1776	1779	56.973784°N 5.831702°W
Samalaman	Loch Ailort	1783	1803	56.831078°N 5.836303°W

=== Eilean Ban ===
This seminary opened on an island previously used as a secret chapel in the middle of Loch Morar, but students had to be sent home after the Jacobite rising of 1715. One of the students during that time became Bishop Hugh MacDonald.

The seminary was opened again after twenty-six years, but became too small for its needs, so the college was moved to Guidal.

=== Guidal ===
This was on the mainland, but the students and staff fled when government soldiers approached the college in the aftermath of the Jacobite rising of 1745 and burned it down.

=== Glenfinnan ===
The seminary was in two rooms of an inn that was built in 1754, in what is now the Glenfinnan Hotel. The rector, John Macdonald, visited the premises and subsequently wrote that it was not a suitable place because of the loudness of the inn.

=== Buorblach ===
When the seminary moved to Buorblach (sometimes spelt Bourblach) it had five students and the building needed to be repaired. The seminary closed soon after Bishop Hugh MacDonald died in 1773.

The seminary opened again in 1776, but it struggled on for another three years before being permanently closed and the students moved to Scalan College.

=== Samalaman ===
The seminary in Samalaman House was on the shore of Loch Ailort in Moidart until it moved to Lismore.

== See also ==
- Roman Catholicism in Scotland
