= Hugh Gilbert =

English-Scottish Catholic prelate (born 1952)

The Right Reverend Hugh Gilbert OSB
- Bishop of Aberdeen
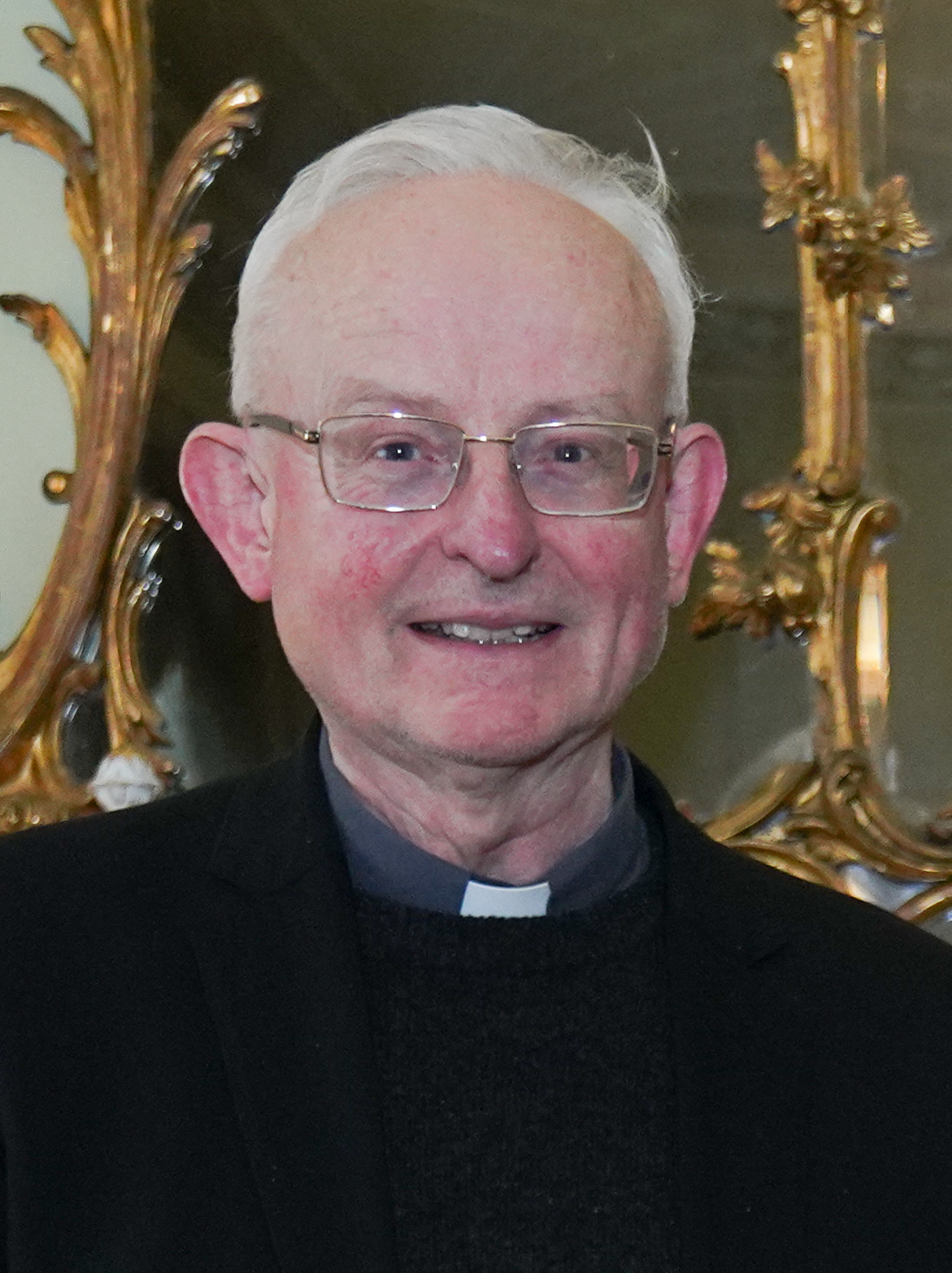
- Bishop Gilbert in 2023
- Church: Catholic
- Diocese: Aberdeen
- Appointed: 4 June 2011
- Installed: 15 August 2011
- Predecessor: Peter Moran
- Other post: President of the Bishops' Conference of Scotland (2018–2024)
- Previous post: Abbot of Pluscarden Abbey (1992–2011)

Orders
- Ordination: 29 June 1982 by Mario Conti
- Consecration: 15 August 2011 by Keith Cardinal O'Brien

Personal details
- Born: Edward Nicholas Gilbert; 15 March 1952 (age 74) Emsworth, Hampshire, England
- Denomination: Catholic
- Education: King's College London
- Motto: Omnia in Ipso constant (Latin for 'All things hold together in Him')

Hugh Gilbert OSB (born 15 March 1952) is an English Catholic Benedictine monk who currently serves as the Bishop of Aberdeen. He previously served as the Abbot of Pluscarden Abbey, of which he is a member, also in Scotland.

== Life ==
=== Early life ===
Edward Nicholas Gilbert was born on 15 March 1952 in Emsworth, Hampshire, to an Anglican family. He was educated at the private St Paul's School in London. At the age of 18, he was received into the Roman Catholic Church on Christmas Eve of 1970. He studied history at King's College London and graduated in 1974 with a first class honours degree in History.

=== Monastic life ===
Gilbert was received into the novitiate of Pluscarden Abbey in Moray, Scotland, in March 1975, at which time he was given the religious name Hugh. He made his temporary profession of monastic vows on 10 March of the following year and was then sent to the former Fort Augustus Abbey, located on the shores of Loch Ness, for studies and preparation for the priesthood. He made his solemn profession of vows on 10 March 1979 and was ordained a priest in 1982 on the Feast of Saints Peter and Paul (29 June) by Mario Conti, then the Bishop of Aberdeen.

Dom Alfred Spencer OSB, the first abbot in the history of the monastery, subsequently appointed Gilbert to various duties in the community: sub-prior in 1984, novice master in 1985, and prior in 1990. Gilbert was elected by the monastic community to succeed Spencer as abbot on 29 October 1992. He received the abbatial blessing from Conti on 8 December, at which time he formally took office. He was a member of the Council of the Union of Monastic Superiors from 1993 to 1997 and of the Abbot Visitor's Council since 1995. During his time as abbot, the community grew to 27 monks.

=== Bishop ===
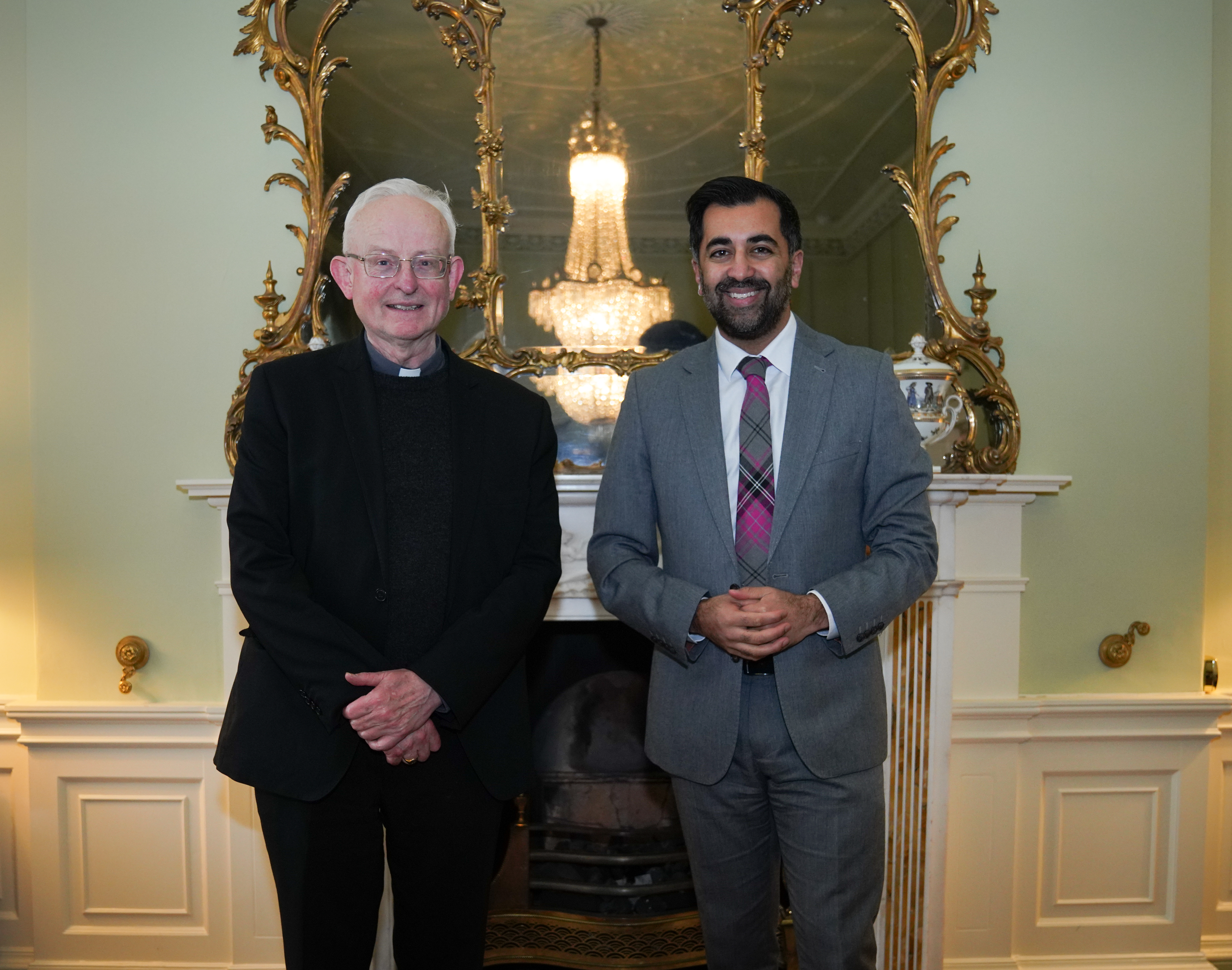
Gilbert meeting with First Minister Humza Yousaf in 2023

Gilbert was appointed the Bishop of Aberdeen by Pope Benedict XVI on 4 June 2011. He was consecrated for this office at the Cathedral Church of St Mary of the Assumption in Aberdeen by Keith Cardinal O'Brien, Archbishop of St Andrews and Edinburgh, on the Feast of the Assumption (15 August) 2011. He chose as his episcopal motto Omnia in Ipso constant (All things hold together in Him), which is a verse from the Letter to the Colossians (1:17).

In November 2018, it was announced that he had been elected the next president of the Bishops' Conference of Scotland. He served in the role from 2018 to 2024, when he was succeeded by John Keenan.

== Same-sex marriage ==
In August 2012, Gilbert argued in the Scottish same-sex marriage debate that if the Scottish Government truly believed in marriage equality, the State would also legalize incest and polygamy.

== Author ==
Gilbert has written a number of journal articles and books on spirituality. His books are:

- Unfolding the Mystery (Gracewing, 2007), a collection of homilies and conferences on the liturgical year ISBN 978 085244 093 3
- Living the Mystery (Gracewing, 2008), reflections on aspects of the Christian life ISBN 978 085244 692 8
- The Tale of Quisquis: Reading the Rule of St Benedict as Story (Gracewing, 2014), conferences on the rule of St Benedict ISBN 978 085244 754 3
- Words for the Advent and Christmas Season (CTS, 2014), homilies for Advent and Christmastide ISBN 978 178469 007 6
- Words for the Lent and Easter Saints (CTS, 2015), homilies ISBN 978 178469 026 7
- Words for Feasts and Saints Days (CTS, 2015), homilies ISBN 978 178469 061 8
- All Time Belongs to Him (Gracewing, 2024), homilies and catecheses ISBN 978 085244 992 9

Catholic Church titles
Preceded by Peter Moran	Bishop of Aberdeen; 2011–present	Incumbent
