= Alexander MacDonald (Scottish bishop) =

Scottish Roman Catholic bishop

The Right Reverend Alexander MacDonald
- Vicar Apostolic of the Highland District
- Church: Roman Catholic Church
- In office: 1779–1791
- Predecessor: John MacDonald
- Successor: John Chisholm
- Other post: Titular Bishop of Polemonium

Orders
- Ordination: 10 August 1764 by Domenico Giordani
- Consecration: 12 March 1780 by George Hay

Personal details
- Born: c. 1736 Bornish, South Uist, Scotland
- Died: 9 September 1791 (aged about 55) Samalaman, Scotland
- Education: Pontifical Scots College

Alexander MacDonald (c. 1736 – 9 September 1791) was a Roman Catholic bishop who served as the Vicar Apostolic of the Highland District, Scotland.

== Biography ==
Born in Bornish, South Uist in about 1736, he was ordained a priest on 10 August 1764. He was appointed the Vicar Apostolic of the Highland District and Titular Bishop of Polemonium by the Holy See on 30 September 1779. He was consecrated to the Episcopate on 12 March 1780. The principal consecrator was Bishop George Hay, and the principal co-consecrator was Bishop Alexander Cameron. In 1783, he moved the seminary for the Highland District to Samalaman House. He died in office on 9 September 1791, aged 55.

== See also ==
- Catholic Church in Scotland

Catholic Church titles
Preceded by John MacDonald	Vicar Apostolic of the Highland District; 1779–1791	Succeeded by John Chisholm
