= Scots College, Douai =

Defunct seminary in France

Scots College Douai
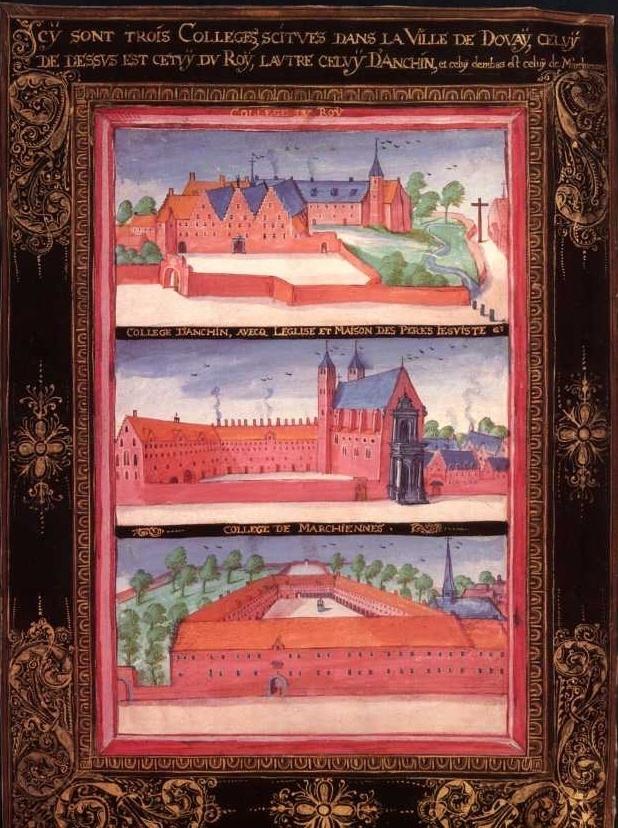
- Colleges at University of Douai
- Type: Seminary
- Active: 1576–1793
- Founder: James Cheyne
- Religious affiliation: Roman Catholic
- Academic affiliations: University of Douai
- Location: Tournai; Pont-à-Mousson; Douai (1593–95); Louvain (1595–1612); Douai (1612–1793)

The Scots College at Douai was a seminary founded in Douai, France, for the training of Scottish Roman Catholic exiles for the priesthood. It was modelled on the similar English College there, founded for the same purpose. It has an unfortunate notoriety in consequence of the long dispute between the Jesuits and the secular clergy which centred around it in later times.

== History ==
The Scots College was founded at Tournai by Dr James Cheyne, a Scottish secular priest, out of the revenues of his canonry there. It soon transferred to Pont-à-Mousson. In 1592, Pope Clement VIII directed it to be relocated to Douai; however three years later it again moved to Louvain (while under the administration of the Jesuit William Crichton), where it was located next to the Jesuit College. In 1606, however, it moved again, and it was not until after several further migrations that it settled finally at Douai in 1612. Prior to the establishment of the Irish College, Douai, from 1593, 25 places were allocated to Irish students in the Scots College, then in Pont-à-Mousson. The seminary was elevated to collegial status in 1632.

At the time of the English Civil War, the Scots Colleges tended to support the crown. Many of the students were from families of the nobility and gentry and loyal to the Stuarts. A number of students interrupted their studies to return home and take up arms for the King.

The college was devoid of resources, and it was due to the zealous efforts of Father Parsons in Rome and Madrid, and of Father Creighton in France and Flanders, that numerous benefactions were given, and it was placed on a permanent footing. For this reason, the Jesuits afterwards claimed the property as their own, although it was admitted that in its early years secular clergy had been educated there. Appeals and counter-appeals were made, but the question was still unsettled when the Jesuits were expelled from France in 1764. The French Government, however, recognized the claims of the Scottish secular clergy and allowed them to continue the work of the college under a rector chosen from their own body.

== Staff ==
Superiors

- William Crichton SJ, 1581–98
- George Christie SJ, 1598–1606
- John Libion, 1606–16
- Philip Dutrieu, 1616–20
- Charles Malapert, 1620–23
- Lambert Lobetius, 1623–28
- James Bonfrerius, 1628–31
- Bernard Robienoy, 1631–32

Rectors

- John Rob, 1631–33
- Hippolytus Curle SJ, 1633–34
- William Leslie, 1634–39
- John le Pipre, 1639
- John de la Rosche, 1639–40
- Thomas Rob, 1640–44; 1671–76; 1682–85
- Robert Gall, 1644–50
- William Christie SJ, 1650–1653; 1656–65
- James Anderson SJ, 1653–56
- Adam Laurence Gordon SJ, 1665–68
- James Brown, 1668–71
- Gilbert Ingles, 1676–80; 1685–91
- Thomas Paterson, 1680–82
- James Forbes, 1691–1700
- Kenneth Strachan SJ, 1700–02; 1731–36
- Stephen Maxwell, 1702–08
- David Fairful, 1708–09
- Robert Fordyce, 1709–14
- James Innes, 1714–18
- Thomas Fife SJ, 1718–21
- Alexander Grant SJ, 1721–31
- James Gordon SJ, 1739–43
- John Riddoch SJ, 1743–48; 1757–66
- Alexander Crookshanks, 1748–52
- Robert Innes, 1752–57
- John Pepper, 1766–72
- George Maxwell, 1772

Aeneas Chisholm was nominated prefect of studies in 1786.

== Alumni ==
As well as clerical students, a number of the exiled Scottish catholic nobility studied at the College.

- Patrick Bath, Irish Capuchin
- Archibald Bower, Historian, one time Jesuit and Anglican
- Andrew Carruthers, vicar apostolic of the Eastern District
- James Carruthers, priest and historian
- John Chisholm, vicar apostolic of the Highland District
- Thomas Dempster, historian and academic
- James Drummond, 3rd Duke of Perth
- John Drummond, 4th Duke of Perth
- Rev. Thomas Fife SJ, Rector of Scots Colleges Rome, Madrid and Douai
- Rev. Adam L. Gordon, Rector of Scots colleges in Rome, Madrid and Douai
- George Hay, 1st Earl of Kinnoull, studied in Douai under his uncle Rev. Edmund Hay
- William Hay, 6th Earl of Kinnoull
- Thomas Maxwell, Jacobite, educated at Douai before moving to Madrid
- Ranald MacDonald, vicar apostolic of the Western District
- Alexander Paterson, vicar apostolic of the Lowland District
- Andrew Scott, vicar apostolic of the Western District
- Francis Sempill, Jacobite 2nd Lord Sempill
- George Seton, 3rd Earl of Winton

== Other Scots colleges ==
- Scots College, Rome
- Scots College, Paris
- Royal Scots College

== See also ==
- English College, Douai
- Irish College, Douai
- University of Douai
- List of Jesuit sites

== Sources ==
- H. de Ridder-Symoens, "The Place of the University of Douai in the Peregrinatio Academica Britannica", in Lines of Contact (nr 117) 21–34.
