= John Chisholm (vicar apostolic of the Highland District) =

Catholic bishop

The Right Reverend John Chisholm
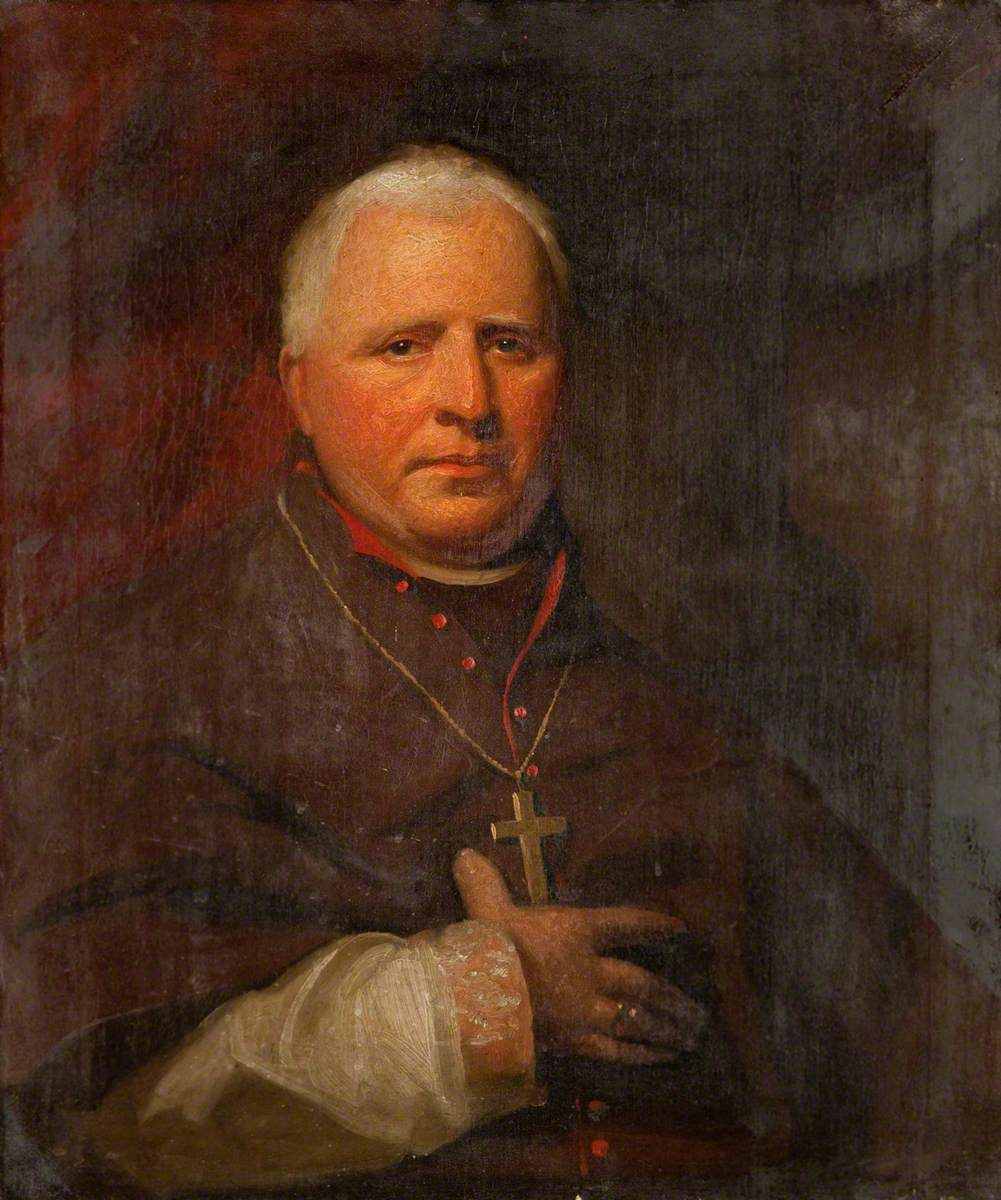
- Church: Roman Catholic
- In office: 1791–1814
- Predecessor: Alexander MacDonald
- Successor: Aeneas Chisholm
- Other post: Titular Bishop of Oreus

Orders
- Ordination: 17 April 1775
- Consecration: 12 February 1792 by George Hay

Personal details
- Born: 12 February 1752 Strathglass, Inverness-shire, Scotland
- Died: 8 July 1814 (aged 62) Lismore, Scotland
- Education: Scots College, Douai

John Chisholm (12 February 1752 – 8 July 1814) was a Scottish Catholic bishop who served as the Vicar Apostolic of the Highland District, Scotland.

== Life ==
Born in Strathglass, Inverness on 12 February 1752, he was sent to the Scots College, Douai, where he was ordained a priest on 17 April 1775. He was appointed the Vicar Apostolic of the Highland District and Titular Bishop of Oreus by the Holy See on 8 November 1791. He was consecrated to the Episcopate on 12 February 1792. The principal consecrator was Bishop George Hay, Vicar Apostolic of the Lowland District.

In 1801, he founded Lismore Seminary. He died in office on 8 July 1814, aged 62 and is buried at Lismore.

Catholic Church titles
Preceded by Alexander MacDonald	Vicar Apostolic of the Highland District; 1791–1814	Succeeded by Aeneas Chisholm
