= Hugh MacDonald (vicar apostolic of the Highland District) =

Scottish bishop (1699–1773)

The Right Reverend Hugh MacDonald
- Vicar Apostolic of the Highland District
- Church: Roman Catholic Church
- Appointed: 12 February 1731
- Term ended: 12 March 1773
- Predecessor: Alexander Grant
- Successor: John MacDonald
- Other post: Titular Bishop of Diana

Orders
- Ordination: 18 September 1725 by James Gordon
- Consecration: 18 October 1731 by James Gordon

Personal details
- Born: 2 February 1699 Morar, Inverness-shire, Scotland
- Died: 12 March 1773 (aged 74) Glen Garry, Scotland

Hugh MacDonald (2 February 1699 – 12 March 1773) was a Roman Catholic bishop who served as the Vicar Apostolic of the Highland District for the illegal Catholic Church in Scotland between 1731 and 1773.

== Early life ==
Hugh MacDonald was born in a wattle and daub house located where the River Meoble emptied into Loch Morar on 2 February 1699. Only the larger size of his birthplace differentiated it from the houses that surrounded it and showed his family to be of higher status. Although he is habitually referred to today as, "the son of the laird of Morar", he was in reality the son of Alexander MacDonald, tacksman of Glen Meoble for his elder brother Allan MacDonald, the Clanranald laird of Morar. Hugh's mother was Mary MacDonald, the daughter of Ranald MacDonald of Kinlochmoidart.

At the time many Catholics in the West Highlands and Islands were looked after by Ulster Irish-speaking missionary priests sent by the Catholic Church in Ireland. One such priest, Antony Mongan, baptized MacDonald. Another, the elderly and consumptive James Cahassy, was assigned during most of the MacDonald's childhood to the illegal chapel at Eilean Bàn in Loch Morar.

He was educated for the priesthood at the seminary founded by James Gordon at Eilean Bàn and continued his studies at a new location after the seminary was forced by the Jacobite rising of 1715 to move to Scalan in Glenlivet. He continued his studies afterwards at Paris.

After completing his studies, he returned to Scotland and was ordained a priest at Scalan by Gordon on 18 September 1725. He was appointed the Vicar Apostolic of the Highland District and Titular Bishop of Diana by the Holy See on 12 February 1731. He was consecrated to the Episcopate on 18 October 1731. The principal consecrator was Gordon, and the principal co-consecrator was John Wallace, assisted by Alexander Smith.

== The Forty-Five ==
(Scottish Gaelic: An bratach bhàn), the Jacobite Standard of the 1745 Uprising.

Upon learning that Prince Charles Edward Stuart had arrived from France and landed at Loch nan Uamh on 25 July 1745, Bishop MacDonald asked his kinsman, MacDonald of Morar, how many French Royal Army troops and military advisers had arrived with the prince and panicked when he was told merely the Seven Men of Moidart and almost no military supplies or money. As a result, Bishop MacDonald argued in vain against beginning the Jacobite Rising of 1745.

When it became clear that his pleading was in vain, the bishop reluctantly assigned several priests of his District, including Alexander Cameron and Colin Campbell of Lochnell, to the Jacobite Army as military chaplains, and blessed (Scottish Gaelic: an bratach bhàn), the Jacobite standard raised at Glenfinnan.

According to historian Maggie Craig, the 1745 rising was and often still is inaccurately, "presented as a Protestant-Catholic struggle" and it is just as often alleged that a Stuart restoration would have meant the forced conversion of all the British people to Roman Catholicism without distinction. In reality, according to his biographer, however, MacDonald was under strict orders from the Congregation for Propaganda at the Holy See, "not to become involved in domestic politics, and as such should not have been near Glenfinnan."

According to a later report by Bishop John Geddes, however, as a clergyman of an illegal church denomination, it is understandable why Hugh MacDonald would have felt very hopeful about the House of Stuart government in exile's promises of Catholic Emancipation, freedom of religion, and civil rights to everyone outside the Established Churches of the realm. It is equally understandable why the Scottish Catholic laity, who, "were discouraged and much exposed to oppression", would similarly, "wish for an event that was likely to release them, and put them again into the possession of the privileges of free-born citizens."

Also according to Watts, the majority of those attending the unfurling of the standard were Episcopalians and Presbyterian Jacobites who felt just as hopeful about Jacobitism as Catholic Jacobites and who, according to Maggie Craig, were similarly, "in their attitudes to women, personal liberty, and religious freedom ... were light years ahead of their adversaries." They also knew the consequences they would face if they failed, but were willing to risk those consequences to fight for what they saw as a better future for their families and their country. What Protestant Jacobites thought, however, of having a Catholic bishop bless the standard rather than a clergyman of their own denominations is not recorded. It is very possible, according to the bishop's biographer, that the sense of fighting for a common cause may have made Protestant Jacobites more accepting of a Catholic ceremony than would have been normal at the time.

== The Year of the Pillaging ==
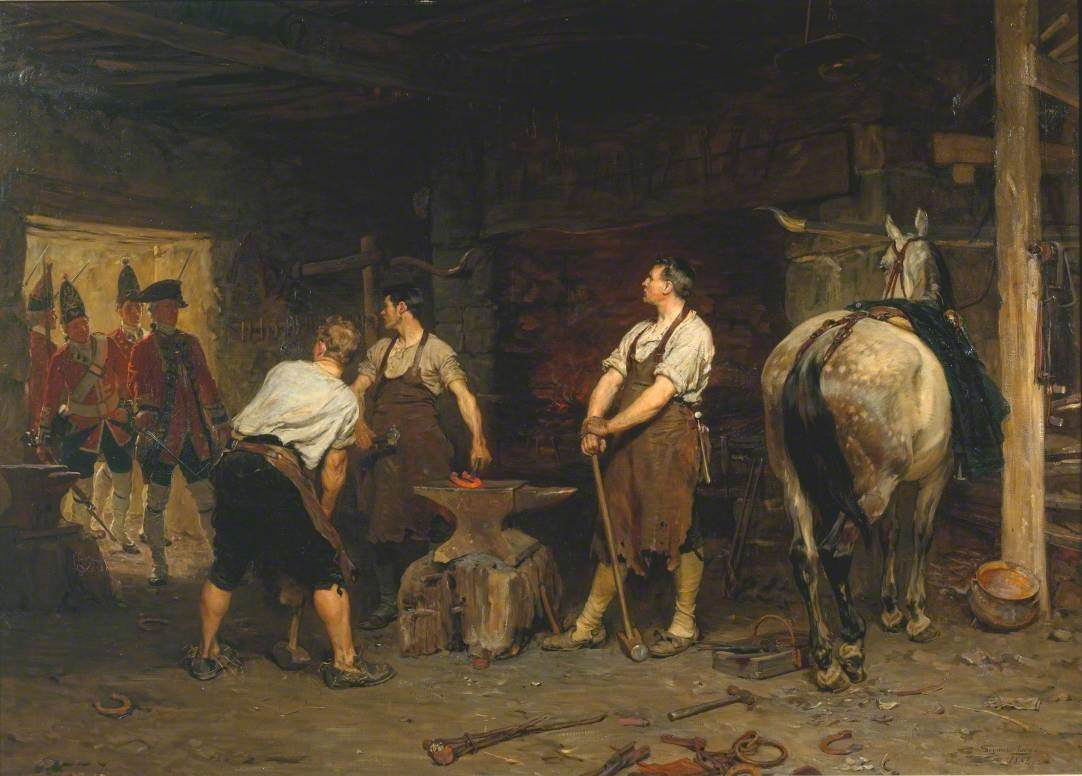
After Culloden, Rebel Hunting by John Seymour Lucas depicts the rigorous search for Jacobites during (Scottish Gaelic: Bliadhna nan Creach "The Year of the Pillaging").

According to John Geddes, "Immediately after the Battle of Culloden, orders were issued for the demolishing all the Catholic chapels and for apprehending the priests." Historian John Watts confirms that this policy was followed by government troops and that, "In doing so, they appear to have been acting on official orders."

After Culloden, MacDonald's movements as a fugitive are difficult to precisely document and he said in later years only that he, "lurked the best way he could." It is known that he was sometimes in hiding at the chapel, library, and former seminary upon Eilean Bàn in Loch Morar.

For this reason, Royal Navy crews under the command of Captain John Fergussone of HMS Furnace and Captain Duff of HMS Terror portaged over nine miles of rough, uncharted, and previously thought impassable terrain. They were seeking to capture the bishop and high-ranking Jacobite Army leader Lord Lovat, who were correctly suspected of meeting with each other upon Eilean Bàn on 8 June 1746. Although the bishop and the others on the island saw the sailors coming from afar off and managed to escape the island and flee the loch-side in the nick of time, the crew of HMS Furnace continued searching in caves surrounding the Loch and eventually succeeded in capturing Lord Lovat.

According to a later report by John Geddes, Lovat had gone to Eilean Bàn to make his Confession and be received back into the Catholic Church by MacDonald.

According to a report of the action for the Duke of Newcastle, upon the island, "They found the before-named Popish bishop's house and chapel; which the sailors quickly gutted and demolished, merrily adorning themselves with the spoils of the chapel. In the scramble, a great many books and papers were tossed about and destroyed."

According to historian John Watts, some of the chapel and seminary foundation stones may still be seen upon Eilean Bàn today. He has termed the 8 June 1746 book burning and the destruction of most of MacDonald personal papers, "an irreplaceable loss both for the eighteenth-century Church and the scholar of today."

The bishop remained in hiding in the neighbouring countryside until, on the sixth rescue attempt ordered by the Comte de Maurepas, the French Minister of Marine, he, the prince, Donald Cameron of Lochiel, and Dr Archibald Cameron of Lochiel were all successfully evacuated from the Prince's Cairn at Loch nan Uamh to France on 19 September 1746.

== Later life ==
While in France he obtained a pension under the name of Marolle. He returned to Scotland in 1749. In 1755 he was apprehended in Edinburgh for being a Catholic priest and for his share in the '45. The priest hunter responsible for his arrest was rewarded by the Royal Treasury.

He was tried at Edinburgh on 1 March 1756, "and in punishment for his refusal to purge himself of Popery, was sentenced to be banished from the kingdom, never to return under pain of death." The sentence, however, was never enforced, and, though the bishop was obliged to live outside his district, he contrived to visit his district occasionally to perform episcopal duties, such as the setting up of Buorblach Seminary.

He died in Glengarry, Lochaber, on 12 March 1773, aged 74.

== In popular culture ==
After moving from Inverie (Scottish Gaelic: Inbhir Aoidh) in Knoydart (Scottish Gaelic: Cnòideart), to Morar (Scottish Gaelic: Mòrar), Alasdair mac Mhaighstir Alasdair, a former Jacobite Army captain, near relative of the bishop composed a poem in praise of both the place and of Bishop MacDonald, the priests, and students at the illegal Buorblach seminary. Based on surviving archival documents and circumstantial evidence, his biographer John Watts believes that MacDonald played a central role in the bard's previous conversion from Presbyterianism to Roman Catholicism.

Catholic Church titles
Preceded by Alexander John Grant	Vicar Apostolic of the Highland District; 1731–1773	Succeeded by John MacDonald
