= Colin Grant (bishop) =

Scottish clergyman

Bishop Colin Cameron Grant (1832–1889) was a Scottish clergyman who briefly served as the Roman Catholic Bishop of Aberdeen in 1889.

== Life ==
Born at Glen Gairn near Ballater on 3 February 1832, he was ordained a priest on 22 December 1855 at Blairs College near Aberdeen.

He was appointed the Bishop of the Diocese of Aberdeen by the Holy See on 16 July 1889, and consecrated to the Episcopate on 13 August 1889. The principal consecrator was Archbishop William Smith, and the principal co-consecrators were Bishop John McLachlan and Bishop (later Archbishop) Angus MacDonald. His main charge as Bishop was St Mary's Cathedral, Aberdeen.

He died at the Bishop's House in Aberdeen on 26 September 1889, aged 57. He is buried in St Mary's Cathedral, Aberdeen.

Catholic Church titles
Preceded by John MacDonald	Bishop of Aberdeen; 1889	Succeeded by Hugh MacDonald
