= Patrick Bath =

Irish Capuchin

Patrick Bath, Irish Capuchin, fl. 1592–1607.

A native of Drogheda, where his father was a wealthy merchant (p. 13), Bath was originally to join the Jesuits. Due to the influence of Francis Nugent, he "made a last-minute decision and joined the Capuchins at Brussels in October 1592." (p. 11)

Bath had studied with Nugent at the Scots-Irish college at pont-a mousson.

F.X. Martin wrote of him – "Though Bath died at Cahors in 1607, before the Irish Mission became a reality, he brought prestige to the Irish Capuchins by his appointment as guardian of the friary at Namur. His prominence among the Capuchins was due to the fact [sic] that a bare nine months after profession he was appointed lector of philosophy in the Capuchin study house newly opened at Louvain." (p. 9).

His appointment at Louvain was a result of the extreme lack of competent professors among the early Capuchins in the Netherlands. Against this is the fact that he depart the Netherlands for Paris where he became lector of philosophy and theology at the friary at rue Saint-Honore. His importance was underlined in 1598 when an English spy listed him ("At Paris – Father Patrick, a Capuchine, a gret scholer.") among the prominent English-speaking Catholics on the continent.

== See also ==
- Aodh Rua Ó Domhnaill
- Patrick Fleming (Franciscan)
