= Cranachan, Lochaber =

Coordinates: 56.919389°N 4.79712°W

Cranachan: Scottish Gaelic: Creannachan
- Location within the Lochaber area
- OS grid reference: NN 298843
- Council area: Highland
- Country: Scotland
- Sovereign state: United Kingdom
- Postcode district: PH31 4
- Police: Scotland
- Fire: Scottish
- Ambulance: Scottish

Cranachan (Scottish Gaelic: Creannachan) is a farmstead about 2.5 miles north-east of Roybridge in Lochaber, in the Highlands, Scotland. Cranachan is in the Highland Council area and stands on the north bank of the confluence of the River Roy and the River Allt Glas Dhoire.

The land at Cranachan was occupied by the MacDonalds of Cranachan, a cadet branch of Clan MacDonald of Keppoch.

Descendants of the MacDonalds of Cranachan include the Australian Saint Mary MacKillop, whose mother Flora MacDonald was of the Cranachan family; Ranald MacDonald, Catholic Bishop and Vicar Apostolic of the Highland District, whose mother was from the Cranachan family; 'Long John' MacDonald who founded the Ben Nevis Distillery and from whom the 'Long John' brand of whisky takes its name.

On the opposite bank of the River Roy, accessed by a path from Cranachan, is a mass stone, with a carved chalice on one side. It is said that open air mass was performed, using the stone as an altar, during times when the practice of Catholicism was persecuted.
