= Peter Moran (bishop) =

Scottish Roman Catholic bishop (1935–2026)

The Right Reverend Peter Moran
- Bishop of Aberdeen
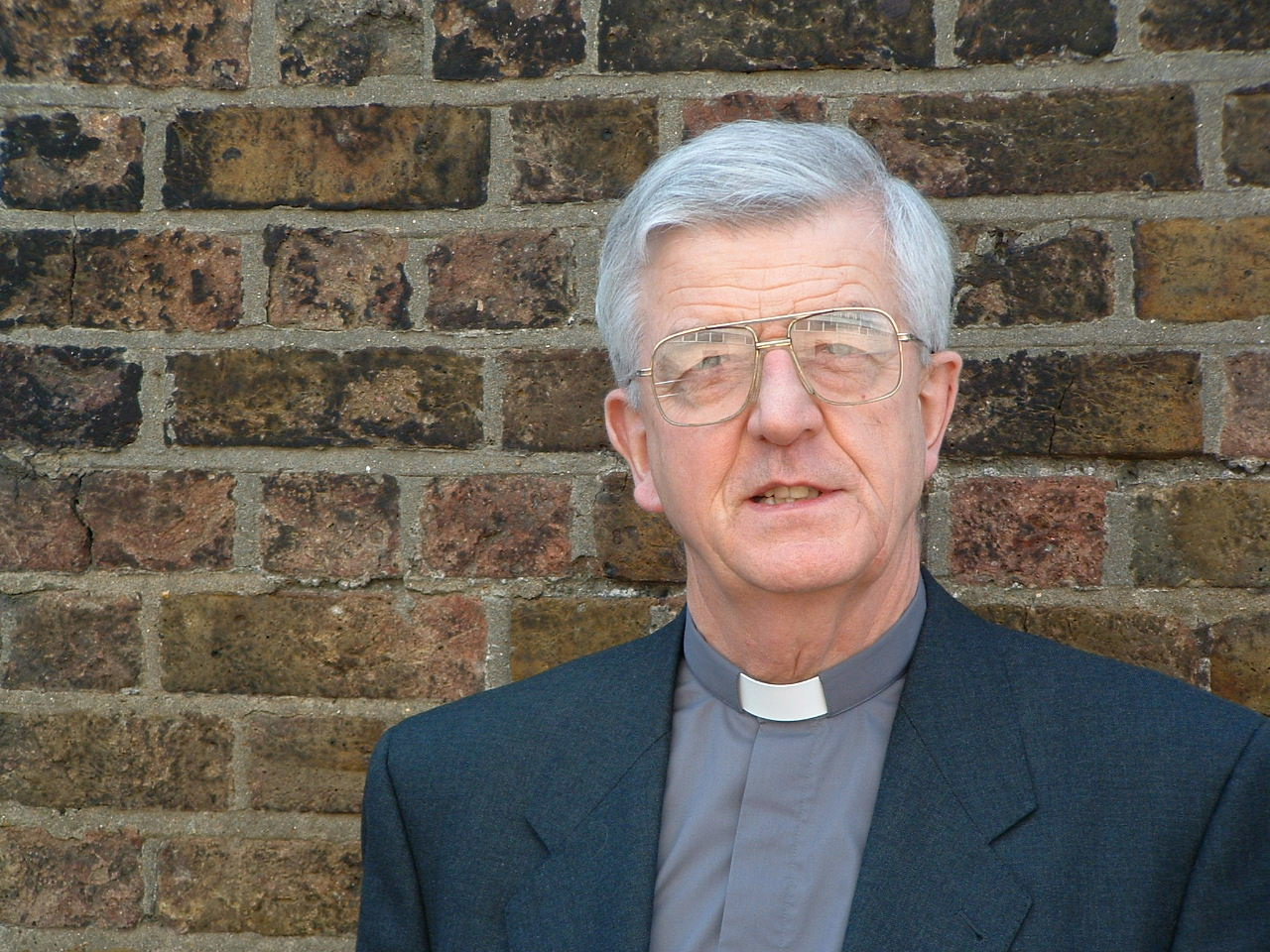
- Moran in 2002
- Church: Roman Catholic Church
- Province: St Andrews and Edinburgh
- Diocese: Aberdeen
- Appointed: 13 October 2003
- Installed: 1 December 2003
- Term ended: 4 June 2011
- Predecessor: Mario Conti
- Successor: Hugh Gilbert

Orders
- Ordination: 19 March 1959 by Manuel Fernández-Conde
- Consecration: 1 December 2003 by Mario Conti, Michael George Bowen, Joseph Devine

Personal details
- Born: Peter Antony Moran; 13 April 1935 Glasgow, Scotland
- Died: 13 November 2026 (aged 91) Aberdeen, Scotland
- Denomination: Roman Catholic

Peter Antony Moran (13 April 1935 – 13 November 2026) was a Scottish Roman Catholic prelate who was the bishop of the Diocese of Aberdeen. A graduate of the Pontifical Scots College and the Pontifical Gregorian University, he was ordained priest in 1959 by Bishop Manuel Fernández-Conde. He was appointed as a bishop by Pope John Paul II in 2003 and was a member of the Educational Institute of Scotland.

== Early life ==
Moran was born in Glasgow on 13 April 1935. After early schooling in Lanarkshire and East Dunbartonshire, he spent nine years in further primary and then secondary education at St Aloysius' College, Glasgow, a Jesuit day school.

== Priesthood ==
Moran's formal education for the Catholic priesthood began with seven years at the Pontifical Scots College in Rome (1952–1959), where he was ordained priest in 1959 at the chapel of the Spanish College by Bishop Manuel Fernández-Conde of Córdoba.

He held the degrees of PhL and STL from the Pontifical Gregorian University in Rome. He was also a graduate of the University of Aberdeen, where he received an MEd degree, as well as the University of Glasgow where he earned an MA (Hons) degree in classics.

At the request of his bishop he attended the University of Glasgow to prepare for a teaching post in Blairs College, then the national minor seminary for Scotland. After graduating in 1963 he trained at Jordanhill College of Education and joined the Blairs College staff in 1964, where he remained until 1986.

Moran also served in a variety of pastoral appointments before becoming bishop: priest in charge of St Mary’s Parish, Blairs; parish priest of Inverurie and also as chaplain to various schools.

For several years, he served as the Roman Catholic "corresponding member" of the Gordon Presbytery of the Church of Scotland. He served from 1986 to 2002 on the education committees of now defunct Grampian Region and later of Aberdeenshire.

He was a life member of the Educational Institute of Scotland (EIS) and chaplain to the French-speaking Catholic community of (mainly oil-related) expatriates in Aberdeen.

== Bishop of Aberdeen ==
When Bishop Mario Conti became Archbishop of Glasgow on 22 February 2002, Moran was elected to the caretaker post of Diocesan Administrator of Aberdeen before being appointed bishop by Pope John Paul II on 13 October 2003. He was consecrated as Bishop of Aberdeen on 1 December 2003 by Archbishop Mario Conti at the Cathedral of St Mary of the Assumption, Aberdeen.

During his time as bishop, Moran was involved with the Scottish Catholic International Aid Fund and was the Bishop Promoter for the Apostleship of the Sea. He retired in 2011.

== Death ==
Peter Moran died on 13 November 2026, aged 91.

== See also ==
Catholic Church titles
Preceded by Mario Joseph Conti	Bishop of Aberdeen; 2003–2011	Succeeded by Hugh Gilbert
