= Ranald MacDonald (bishop) =

Scottish bishop (1756–1832)

The Right Reverend Ranald MacDonald
- Vicar Apostolic of the Western District
- Church: Roman Catholic Church
- Appointed: 13 February 1827
- Term ended: 20 September 1832
- Successor: Andrew Scott
- Other post: Titular Bishop of Arindela
- Previous post: Vicar Apostolic of the Highland District

Orders
- Ordination: 1782
- Consecration: 25 February 1820 by Alexander Paterson

Personal details
- Born: 1756 Edinburgh, Scotland
- Died: 20 September 1832 (aged 76) Fort William, Scotland
- Buried: Fort William, Scotland
- Denomination: Roman Catholic
- Parents: Ranald MacDonald and Margaret (née MacDonald) MacDonald
- Education: Scots College, Douay

Ranald MacDonald (1756–1832) was a Roman Catholic bishop who served as the Vicar Apostolic of the Highland District from 1819 to 1827, then the Vicar Apostolic of the Western District from 1827 to 1832.

== Life ==
Born in Edinburgh in 1756, he was the eldest child of Ranald MacDonald, 7th tacksman of Fersit for Clan MacDonald of Keppoch. His mother Margaret MacDonald, daughter of Donald MacDonald, 2nd of Cranachan. He was educated at the Scots College, Douay, France. He was ordained a priest in 1782, and returned to his native country in that same year. He was first stationed at Glengairn, Aberdeenshire, from which he was transferred to Glengarry, and thence to Uist.

He was appointed the Vicar Apostolic of the Highland District and Titular Bishop of Arindela by the Holy See on 27 August 1819, with his residence at Lismore. He was consecrated at Edinburgh by Bishop Alexander Paterson on 25 February 1820.

In 1827, the Roman Catholic Church in Scotland was reorganised into three vicariate apostolics, the Eastern District (formerly the Lowland District), the Northern District (formerly the Highland District), and the Western District (created from territory of the other two districts). As a result of those changes, Bishop MacDonald became the Vicar Apostolic of the newly formed Western District on 13 February 1827.

MacDonald's scholarly attainments were of a high order. He was a man of polished manners and liberality of sentiment, and was beloved by persons of all persuasions. He did much by his work and conversation to soften down prejudices, and was ever ready to lend his aid in forwarding any scheme which had for its object the advancement of his fellow Highlanders.

He died in office at Fort William on 20 September 1832, aged 76, and was buried there.

During his time as bishop there came into his possession one of the Scotland's greatest ecclesiastical relics, the Last Chalice of Iona. Of fine beaten gold, upon which the marks of the hammer were quite distinct, its whole design indicated its great antiquity. It had passed from the possession of Sir Charles Lachlan Maclean, to that of Aeneas created by Charles II., Lord Macdonnell and Aros, and was gifted by Colonel Ranaldson Macdonell of Glengarry, to Bishop Ranald Macdonald, on whose death it came into the custody of his successor, Bishop Scott.

Catholic Church titles
Preceded by Aeneas Chisholm	Vicar Apostolic of the Highland District; 1819–1827	Succeeded by James Kyle (Vicar Apostolic of the Northern District)
New title	Vicar Apostolic of the Western District; 1827–1832	Succeeded by Andrew Scott
