= John MacDonald (bishop of Aberdeen) =

Scottish clergyman

The Right Reverend John MacDonald
- Bishop of Aberdeen
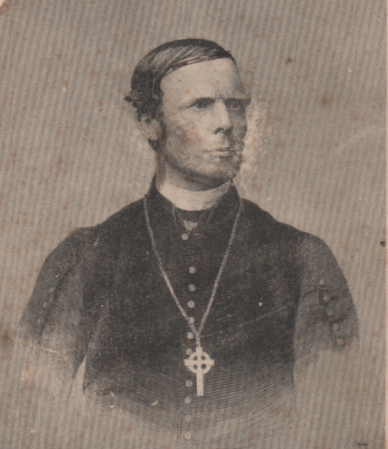
- Church: Roman Catholic
- Province: St Andrews and Edinburgh
- Diocese: Aberdeen
- Appointed: 15 March 1878
- Term ended: 4 February 1889
- Successor: Colin Grant
- Previous posts: Vicar Apostolic of the Northern District and Titular Bishop of Nicopolis ad Iaterum (1869–1878)

Orders
- Ordination: 4 November 1841 (Priest) by James Kyle
- Consecration: 24 February 1869 (Bishop) by James Chadwick

Personal details
- Born: 2 July 1818 Strathglass, Inverness, Scotland
- Died: 4 February 1889 (aged 70) Aberdeen, Scotland
- Parents: William MacDonald and Harriet MacDonald (née Fraser)
- Education: Pontifical Scots College
- Motto: Per mare per terras

John MacDonald (2 July 1818 – 4 February 1889) was a Scottish clergyman who served as the Roman Catholic Bishop of Aberdeen from 1878 to 1889.

== Early life ==
Born in Strathglass, Inverness on 2 July 1818, he was the son William MacDonald and Harriet MacDonald (née Fraser). His early education was at the local school, before being sent to the Scots Seminary in Ratisbon in 1830, where he remained there for the next seven years. On 6 June 1837, he entered the Scots College in Rome, and took the oath there on 22 April 1838.

== Priestly career ==
He was ordained a subdeacon in the chapel of the Congregation of the Nobles, at the Gesù, on 10 May 1840. He left the Scots College on 11 June 1840, and returned to Scotland, where he was ordained a deacon in 1841, and later in the same year, ordained a priest on 4 November 1841. Between 1841 and 1868, he served in a number of missions in Scotland. He was an assistant at Tombae, Banffshire (December 1842 to February 1842); Glenmoriston, Inverness-shire (February 1842 to May 1844) and Dornie Kintail, Ross-shire (1843 to May 1844); and Braemar, Aberdeenshire (May 1844 to May 1845). He was an assistant at Inverness (May 1845 to May 1846), then had sole charge of that mission (1846 to 1848). Finally, he was in charge of the missions at Fassnakyle in Upper Strathglass (summer 1848 to Whit Sunday 1856), and at Eskadale in Lower Strathglass (1856 to 1868).

== Episcopal career ==
He was appointed the Coadjutor Vicar Apostolic of the Northern District and Titular Bishop of Nicopolis ad Iaterum by the Holy See on 11 December 1868. On the death of Bishop James Kyle on 23 February 1869, MacDonald automatically succeeded as the Vicar Apostolic of the Northern District. He was consecrated to the Episcopate at the Church of St Mary of the Assumption (now Cathedral) in Aberdeen on 24 February 1869. The principal consecrator was Bishop James Chadwick, and the principal co-consecrators were Bishop John Gray and Archbishop John Menzies Strain. He participated in the First Vatican Council.

On 15 March 1878, the Scottish hierarchy was restored by Pope Leo XIII. The Northern District was elevated to the Diocese of Aberdeen, with MacDonald becoming its first Roman Catholic bishop since the Scottish Reformation.

He died in office on 4 February 1889, aged 70. He is buried in St Mary's Cathedral, Aberdeen.

== Sources ==
Cooper, Thompson (1893). "Macdonald, John (1818-1889)" . In Lee, Sidney (ed.). Dictionary of National Biography. Vol. 35. London: Smith, Elder & Co.

Catholic Church titles
Preceded by James Kyle	Vicar Apostolic of the Northern District; 1869–1878	Title elevated
New creation	Bishop of Aberdeen; 1878–1889	Succeeded by Colin Grant
