= Alexander Grant (bishop) =

Scottish bishop

Alexander John Grant
- Born: 1693; Scottish Highlands
- Died: 19 September 1727 (aged 33–34); Genoa, Republic of Genoa
- Education: Scots College, Rome
- Religion: Roman Catholic
- Offices held: Vicariate Apostolic of the Highland District

Alexander John Grant (1693 – 19 September 1727) was a Roman Catholic clergyman who briefly served as the vicar apostolic of the Highland District, Scotland.

Educated at the Scots College in Rome, he was appointed the first vicar apostolic of the Highland District and titular bishop of Sura by the Holy See on 16 September 1727. However, Father Grant died on 19 September 1727, without being consecrated a bishop.

Catholic Church titles
New title	Vicar Apostolic of the Highland District; 1727	Succeeded by Hugh MacDonald
