= Ogilvie Institute =

Coordinates: 57.1452°N 2.1063°W

The Ogilvie Institute is a college in the Catholic Diocese of Aberdeen, in Scotland, that specialises in part-time and distance-learning courses of religious education and formation, catechesis and theology for adults.

The institute has close working relationships with both the Open University and Maryvale Institute.
