= James Kyle (bishop) =

Catholic bishop (1788–1869)

The Right Reverend James Kyle
- Vicar Apostolic of the Northern District
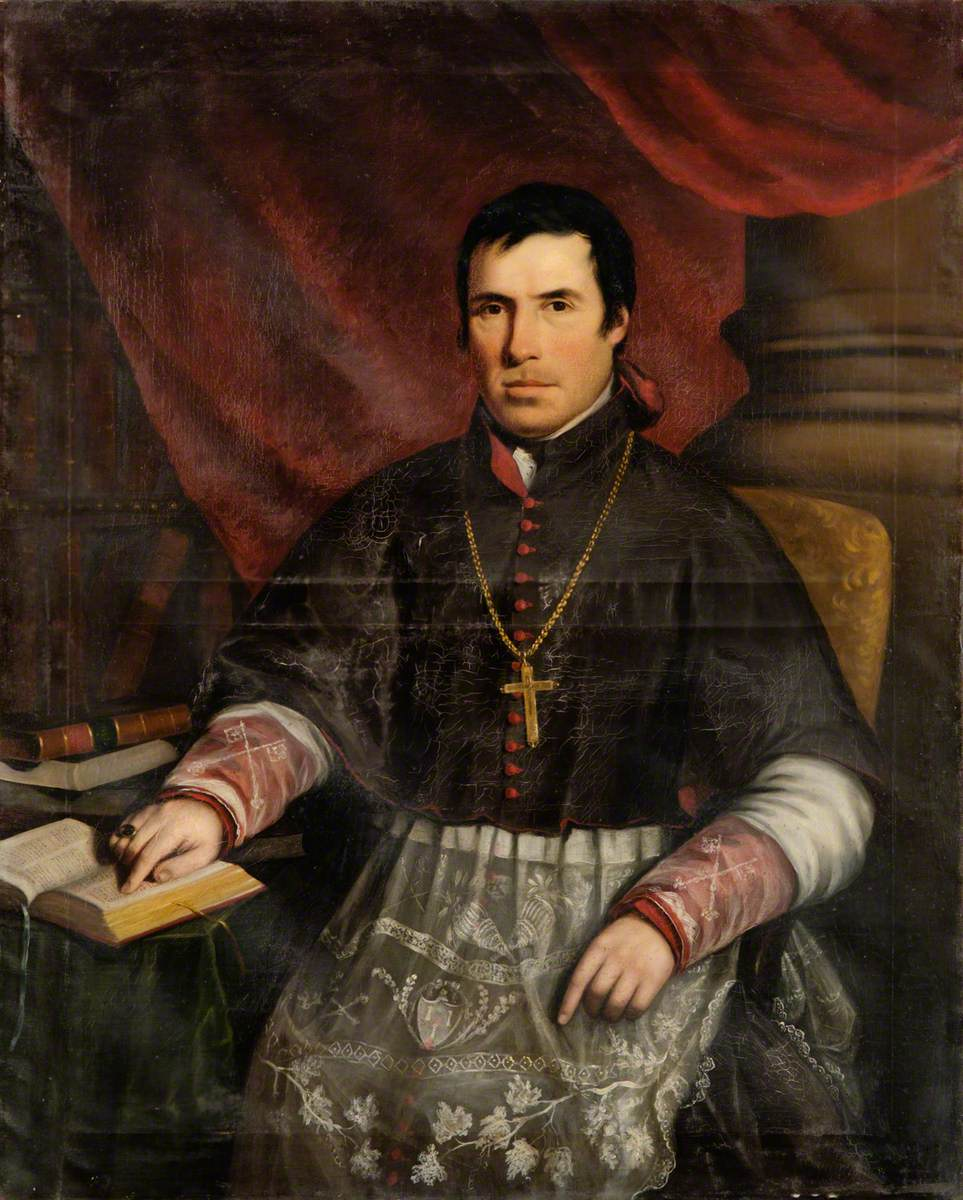
- Portrait by James Bisset, Blairs Museum
- Church: Roman Catholic
- In office: 1827–1869
- Successor: John MacDonald
- Other post: Titular Bishop of Germanicia

Orders
- Ordination: 21 March 1812 by Alexander Cameron
- Consecration: 28 September 1828 by Alexander Paterson

Personal details
- Born: 22 September 1788 Edinburgh, Scotland
- Died: 23 February 1869 (aged 80) Preshome, Scotland

James Francis Kyle (22 September 1788 – 23 February 1869) was a Scottish Roman Catholic bishop who served as the first Vicar Apostolic of the Northern District of Scotland.

== Life ==
Born in Edinburgh on 22 September 1788, he was ordained a priest on 21 March 1812. He was appointed the Vicar Apostolic of the Northern District (formerly known the Highland District) and Titular Bishop of Germanicia by the Holy See on 13 February 1827. He was consecrated to the Episcopate at Aberdeen on 28 September 1828. The principal consecrator was Bishop Alexander Paterson, and the principal co-consecrators were Bishop Ranald MacDonald and Bishop Thomas Penswick. With assistance from architects A & W Reid, he designed St Peter's Church in Buckie, build between 1851 and 1857, and worked on numerous other buildings in the diocese.

He died at the Bishop's House on 23 February 1869, aged 80.

Catholic Church titles
New title	Vicar Apostolic of the Northern District; 1827–1869	Succeeded by John MacDonald
