= John MacDonald (vicar apostolic of the Highland District) =

The Right Reverend John MacDonald
- Vicar Apostolic of the Highland District
- Church: Roman Catholic Church
- In office: 1773–1779
- Predecessor: Hugh MacDonald
- Successor: Alexander MacDonald
- Other posts: Titular Bishop of Tiberiopolis (1761–1779)

Orders
- Ordination: 1 April 1752 by Giovanni Antonio Guadagni
- Consecration: 27 September 1761 by Ferdinando Maria de Rossi

Personal details
- Born: c. 1727 Ardnamurchan, Scotland
- Died: 9 May 1779 (aged about 52) Knoydart, Scotland
- Education: Pontifical Scots College

John MacDonald (c. 1727 – 9 May 1779) was a Roman Catholic bishop who served as the Vicar Apostolic of the Highland District of Scotland.

== Life ==
Born in Ardnamurchan, Argyllshire in about 1727, he was ordained a priest on 1 April 1752. He was appointed the Coadjutor Vicar Apostolic of the Highland District and Titular Bishop of Tiberiopolis by the Holy See on 25 February 1761. He was consecrated to the Episcopate at Preshome on 27 September 1761. The principal consecrator was Bishop Hugh MacDonald, and the principal co-consecrators were Bishop Alexander Smith and Bishop James Grant. On the death of Bishop MacDonald on 12 March 1773, he automatically succeeded as the Vicar Apostolic of the Highland District. He died in office on 9 May 1779, aged 52.

Catholic Church titles
Preceded by Hugh MacDonald	Vicar Apostolic of the Highland District; 1773–1779	Succeeded by Alexander MacDonald
