= Mario Conti =

Catholic archbishop (1934–2022)

The Most Reverend Mario Conti
- Archbishop of Glasgow
- Church: Roman Catholic Church
- Archdiocese: Glasgow
- Appointed: 15 January 2002
- Installed: 22 February 2002
- Term ended: 24 July 2012
- Predecessor: Thomas Joseph Winning
- Successor: Philip Tartaglia
- Previous posts: Bishop of Aberdeen (1977–2002)

Orders
- Ordination: 26 October 1958 (Priest) by Luigi Traglia
- Consecration: 3 May 1977 (Bishop) by Gordon Joseph Gray

Personal details
- Born: Mario Giuseppe Conti; 20 March 1934 Elgin, Moray, Scotland
- Died: 8 November 2022 (aged 88) Glasgow, Scotland
- Buried: St Andrew's Cathedral, Glasgow
- Parents: Louis Joseph Conti and Josephine Quintilia Conti (née Panicali)
- Motto: Sincero corde servire

Mario Joseph Conti (born Mario Giuseppe Conti; 20 March 1934 – 8 November 2022) was a Scottish Catholic prelate who served as the Archbishop of the Metropolitan see of Glasgow, Scotland between 2002 and his retirement in 2012. Ordained to the priesthood in 1958, Conti spent most of his life in the service of the Church, being consecrated Bishop of Aberdeen in 1977 where he served until his appointment to Glasgow.

Conti died in November 2022 after what was reported as a ‘short illness’ in the Queen Elizabeth University Hospital in Glasgow.

== Background ==
Mario Giuseppe Conti was born on 20 March 1934, in Elgin, Moray, son of Louis Joseph Conti and Josephine Quintilia Conti (née Panicali). He studied for the priesthood at The Scots College, Rome and was ordained a priest of the Diocese of Aberdeen in the Church of San Marcello al Corso, by Archbishop Luigi Traglia on 26 October 1958.

After a period as Assistant Priest at St Mary's Cathedral in Aberdeen, Fr. Conti served as parish priest of the most northerly Roman Catholic parish in the British mainland, St Joachim's and St Anne's (Wick and Thurso respectively) in Caithness from 1962 to 1977. He was appointed bishop of Aberdeen on 28 February 1977, succeeding Michael Foylan. He was consecrated to that post by Cardinal Gordon Gray on 3 May 1977. He was awarded the degree of Doctor of Divinity honoris causa by the University of Aberdeen in 1989, being the first Catholic priest to be so honoured since the Reformation.

As bishop of Aberdeen he rejected claims that the Church sought to protect the interests of nuns and priests above those of children who said they had been abused. It followed the conviction of Sister Marie Docherty on four charges of cruelty towards girls at Nazareth House children's homes in Aberdeen and Midlothian in the 1960s and 1970s. The Liberal Democrats MP for Gordon, Malcolm Bruce, called on the church to apologise to Sister Marie's victims, but Conti resisted any public apology.

Bishop Conti was translated to the archdiocese of Glasgow on 15 January 2002, succeeding Thomas Winning. He took possession of the archdiocese on 22 February 2002. Pope John Paul II bestowed the Pallium on Archbishop Conti on 29 June 2004, the Feast of Saint Peter and Saint Paul. Archbishop Conti was a member of the Pontifical Council for Promoting Christian Unity.

Conti was succeeded as Metropolitan Archbishop of Glasgow in September 2012, with the installation of Archbishop Philip Tartaglia, who was previously the Bishop of Paisley.

Conti died from pneumonia at Queen Elizabeth University Hospital in Glasgow, on 8 November 2022, at the age of 88.

== Episcopate ==
=== Offices and awards ===
Archbishop Conti was President of the Commission for Christian Doctrine and Unity and also of the Heritage Commission of the Bishops’ Conference of Scotland. The Archbishop was a member of the Catholic Bishops’ Joint Committee for Bio-Ethics and also of the Central Council of ACTS (Action of Churches Together in Scotland) and was a President of CTBI (Churches Together in Britain and Ireland).

Conti held the following honours:

Commendatore nell’Ordine al Merito della Repubblica Italiana, 1981.

Honorary D.D. (University of Aberdeen), 1989.

Honorary D.D. (University of Glasgow), 2010

Knight Commander of the Equestrian Order of the Holy Sepulchre of Jerusalem and a Knight of the Order of St John of Jerusalem Rhodes and Malta, 1991;

Principal Chaplain to the British Association of the Order of Malta, 1995-2000.

Fellow of the Royal Society of Edinburgh

Honorary Professor of Theology at the University of Aberdeen, 2002

Grande Ufficiale della Stella della Solidarieta' Italiana

=== Restoration of St Andrew's Cathedral ===
Following a successful fund raising campaign Archbishop Conti oversaw the major renovation of St Andrew's Metropolitan Cathedral in Glasgow between 2009-2011. The £5m programme was described as the most significant renovation of a Catholic church in Scotland since the reformation. The dramatic transformation was widely acclaimed and the opening was attended by Scotland's First Minister and representatives of other Christian denominations. The Cathedral now boasts new flooring, new heating and sound systems, new seating, new altar and ambo (designed by the Archbishop himself) and an iconic painting of St John Ogilvie by acclaimed Scottish painter Peter Howson. To the east of the Cathedral, thanks to a fund raising campaign among the Scots Italian community an Italian Cloister Garden has been created with a dramatic modern monument to recall the Arandora Star disaster in 1940.

=== Accusations against the BBC ===
In 2004, he accused the BBC of "rudeness and prejudice" in its coverage of the Catholic Church and of "gross insensitivity" at the time of Pope John Paul II's silver jubilee. He said that the 25th anniversary of the pontificate of Pope John Paul II and the beatification of Mother Teresa had been marked with a documentary entitled Sex and the Holy City, which looked at the effectiveness of condoms in the fight against AIDS. He also questioned the plans to broadcast a cartoon called Popetown, which satirised the Pope as a childish pensioner and he accused Newsnight Scotland of conducting a "sneering and aggressive" interview on the church's position on shared campus schools. The National Secular Society described the claims as "grossly anti-democratic and dangerous". A spokesperson for the BBC said: "We are always keen to ensure that all faiths are reflected across our output and are reported accurately."

=== Human cloning ===
In 2003, Conti publicly accused the UK Government of paving the way for human cloning. He claimed the first step on the "nightmarish journey" had been the acceptance of test tube babies or in vitro fertilisation (IVF) in 1978.

=== Gay rights ===
Archbishop Conti was a vociferous opponent of extensions to gay rights. In 2000, he signed a public letter alongside Cardinal Winning which called for the retention of Section 28 of the Local Government Act despite efforts by the government to repeal. The letter argued that it was important to prevent the funding and promotion of educational material overtly promoting homosexual practice in schools.

In 2006 Conti publicly voiced his views on the case of nine Scottish firefighters who had been disciplined for refusing to take part in a gay pride event, saying it was wrong to expect them to participate. Not because homosexual people should not be given fire safety advice, but because the men felt uncomfortable about the 'kiss-a-fireman' campaign allegedly planned for the event.

Also in 2006, Conti called on MSPs to reject the Civil Partnerships (Scotland) Bill, which would provide unmarried couples in "committed" relationships with equality in areas like inheritance, pensions and bereavement saying, "It is not homophobia and we have no gripe against homosexuals per se but we believe that the homosexual relationship is subversive." He later criticised government proposals to permit the adoption of children by gay couples.

Later that same year he preached a sermon which put forward the view that the moral teaching of the Church was being undermined. In part of the sermon, he criticized the UK's civil partnerships legislation which had recently been introduced. He also mentioned the Catholic Church's traditional teaching, stating that homosexual acts cannot be considered equivalent to marital love between a man and a woman. After Patrick Harvie (a Green MSP and advocate of LGBT equality) heard about the Archbishop's sermon, he wrote to the Chief Constable of Strathclyde Police asking for the Force to give clarity regarding the criteria for using breach of the peace charges in relation to comments which might be seen to incite hatred on grounds of sexual orientation.

In October 2010, he sent a public letter to all Scottish parishes urging Catholic parishioners to oppose Government plans to give gay couples the right to marry. He warned that the move would create "larger divisions" in society. This prompted the Scottish Liberal Democrat leader Willie Rennie to suggest that the Catholic Church was trying to control opinion.

=== Lockerbie bomber ===
In 2009, Conti was vocal in supporting the release by the Scottish government of Abdelbaset Ali al-Megrahi, who had been imprisoned for his part in the Lockerbie bombing. Conti argued that, "I personally, and many others in the Catholic community, admired the decision to release Abdelbaset Ali al-Megrahi on grounds of compassion which is, after all, one of the principles inscribed on the mace of the Scottish Parliament by which Scotland's government should operate."

=== Sexual health ===
In 2004, Conti criticised Scottish Executive proposals to tackle sexual health problems among young people. He argued that the draft strategy placed too much emphasis on medical treatment and not enough on spiritual or social worries. Concern over homosexuality being perceived as equal to heterosexual relationships and the absence of references to marriage in the report were also highlighted by the archbishop.

=== Summorum Pontificum ===
In 2007 he issued directives on the application of the motu proprio Summorum Pontificum in his diocese. This clarified arrangements for priests who wished to freely celebrate in Glasgow the Mass according to the 1962 Roman Missal (the Tridentine Mass). Father John Zuhlsdorf said they were directly disobedient to Benedict XVI's motu proprio, which allowed complete freedom for celebrating this form of Mass without a congregation but demanded certain conditions for its celebration with a congregation.

=== Support for asylum seekers ===
In 2012 he launched an outspoken defence of asylum seekers facing destitution. The Archbishop wrote an article urging action to defend the asylum seekers at risk (Sunday Herald 10 June 2012) and backed a public demonstration to protest at the asylum seekers' eviction: "It seems utterly inconceivable that a country with such strong traditions of welfare provision, fairness and social cohesion could allow innocent persons to be evicted, banned from working, left without food and shelter, and effectively eliminated from society. But that is exactly what is likely to happen – unless something is done."

Catholic Church titles
Preceded by Michael Foylan	Bishop of Aberdeen; 1977–2002	Succeeded by Peter Antony Moran
Preceded by Thomas Joseph Winning	Archbishop of Glasgow; 2002–2012	Succeeded by Philip Tartaglia
