= St Mary's Cathedral, Aberdeen =

Cathedral in Aberdeen, Scotland

Coordinates: 57.1454°N 2.1064°W

St Mary's Cathedral
- Cathedral Church of St Mary of the Assumption, Aberdeen
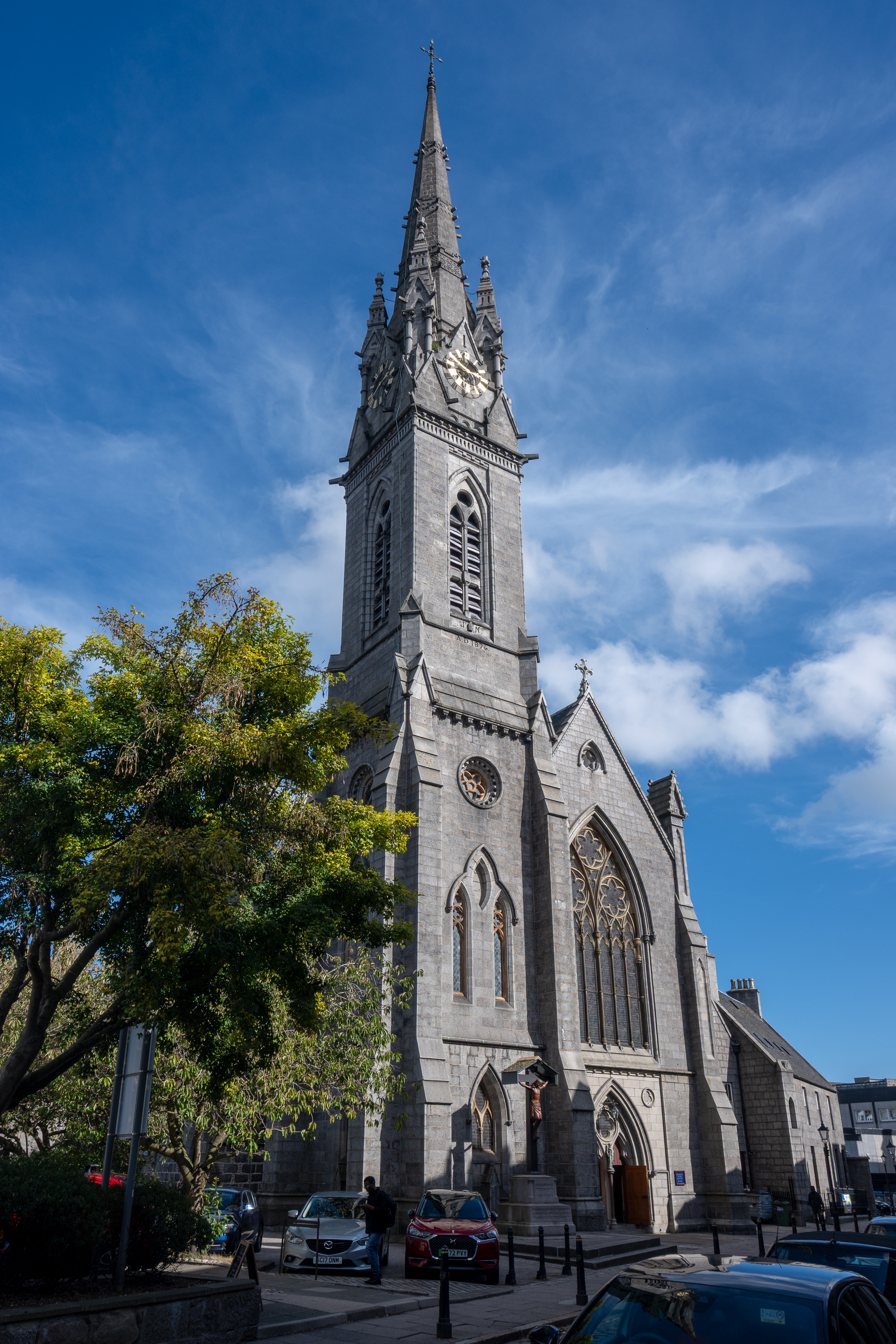

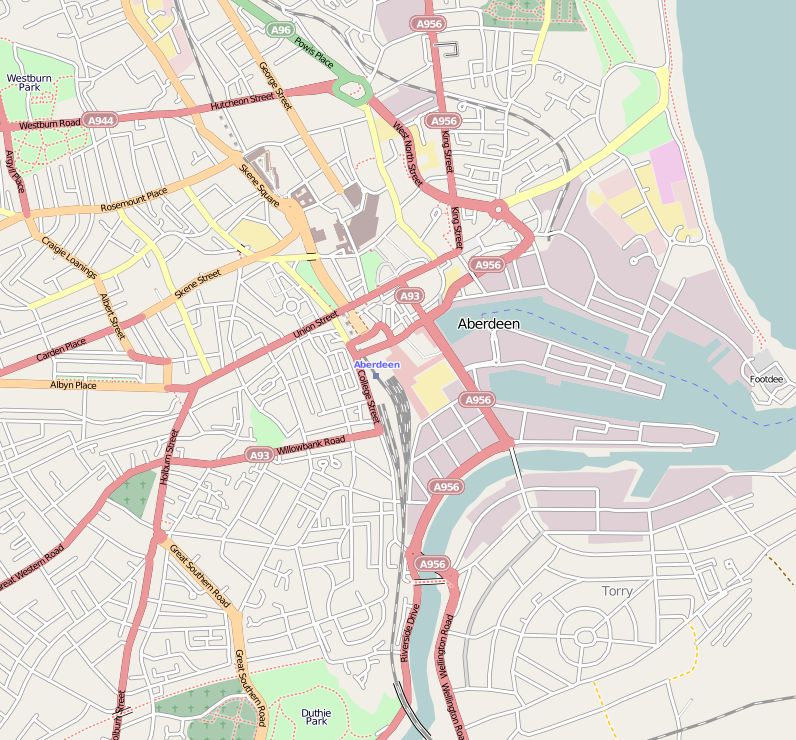
- Shown within Aberdeen
- Location: Aberdeen, Aberdeenshire
- Country: Scotland
- Denomination: Roman Catholic
- Website: stmaryscathedralaberdeen.org

Architecture
- Architect: Alexander Ellis
- Years built: 1860

Administration
- Province: St Andrews and Edinburgh
- Diocese: Aberdeen

Clergy
- Bishop: Rt Rev Hugh Gilbert
- Dean: Fr Keith Herrera

The Cathedral Church of St Mary of the Assumption, usually known as St Mary's Cathedral, is a cathedral of the Roman Catholic Church in the city of Aberdeen, Scotland. It is the home of the see of the Bishop of Aberdeen, who is the ordinary of the Roman Catholic Diocese of Aberdeen in the Province of St Andrews & Edinburgh. It stands at 20 Huntly Street in Aberdeen.

== Construction ==
The cathedral was designed by Alexander Ellis and opened in 1860. The spire and bells were added by Robert Gordon Wilson in 1876–77 to mark the church being raised to cathedral status.

The organ dates from 1887 and is by James Conacher of Huddersfield. The cathedral was rededicated in 1960 following simplification of the interior in alignment with the reforms of the Second Vatican Council.

== Stained glass ==
A window of 1978 is dedicated to St John Ogilvie by David Gulland.

== Monuments ==
The church contains monuments to four Scottish bishops: George Hay; James Kyle; John MacDonald; and Colin Grant. The latter two are also buried in the cathedral, as is William Monsignor Stopani.

== Services ==
Over and above the daily services there is a weekly Polish mass and monthly Spanish mass.

== See also ==
- List of cathedrals in the United Kingdom
- Roman Catholicism in Scotland
- St Machar's Cathedral — the original cathedral of Aberdeen, now a Church of Scotland High Kirk
- St Andrew's Cathedral — cathedral of the Scottish Episcopal Church
