= Roman Catholic Diocese of Aberdeen =

Roman Catholic diocese in Scotland

Diocese of Aberdeen Dioecesis Aberdonensis

Catholic
- Coat of Arms of the Diocese of Aberdeen

Location
- Country: Scotland
- Territory: City of Aberdeen and the council areas of Aberdeenshire, Moray, central and northern part of Highland, and the islands of Orkney and Shetland
- Ecclesiastical province: St Andrews and Edinburgh
- Metropolitan: Archdiocese of St Andrews and Edinburgh
- Coordinates: 57.138°N 2.143°W

Statistics
- Area: 29,068 km^{2} (11,223 sq mi)
- Population: Total; Catholics: (as of 2012); 728,000; 18,500 (2.5%)
- Parishes: 43

Information
- Denomination: Catholic
- Rite: Roman Rite
- Established: 4 March 1878
- Cathedral: St Mary's Cathedral, Aberdeen
- Secular priests: 31

Current leadership
- Pope: Leo XIV
- Bishop: Hugh Gilbert
- Metropolitan Archbishop: Leo Cushley
- Vicar General: Domenico Zanre

Map
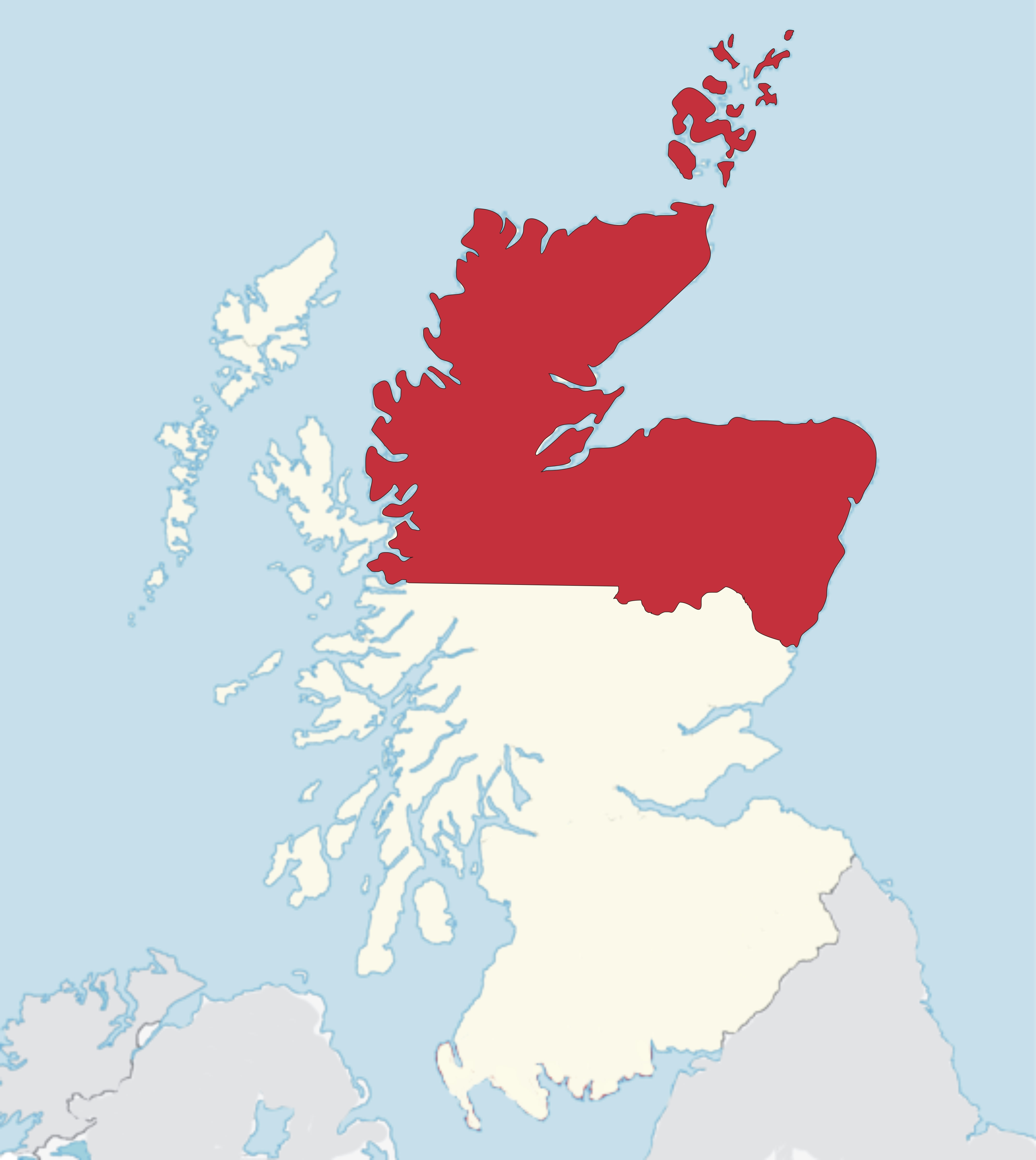

The Diocese of Aberdeen (Latin: Dioecesis Aberdonensis) is a diocese of the Latin Church of the Catholic Church in Scotland.

== Foundation ==
The see is the successor of that founded in 1012 at Mortlach by Beyn, which was moved to Aberdeen, by Bishop Nechtan of Aberdeen in April 1132, during the reign of King David I of Scotland. The earliest mention of the see as that of Aberdeen is in the charter of the foundation, by the Earl of Buchan, of the Church of Deer (c. 1152), which is witnessed by Nectan, Bishop of Aberdeen. The first ecclesiastical record of the see is in a papal bull of Pope Adrian IV (1157), confirming to Bishop Edward the churches of Aberdeen and Saint Machar, with the town of Old Aberdeen and other lands.

The granite cathedral was built between 1272 and 1277. Bishop Thomas Spence founded a Franciscan house in 1480, and King's College was founded at Old Aberdeen by Bishop Elphinstone, for eight prebendaries, chapter, sacristan, organist, and six choristers, in 1505. The see was transferred to Old Aberdeen about 1125, and continued there until 1577, having had in that time a list of twenty-nine bishops.

== Restoration of the Diocese ==
The Scottish Church officially broke allegiance with the Roman church in 1560, but continued intermittently having bishops until 1689. On 4 March 1878, Pope Leo XIII restored the hierarchy of Scotland by the Bull Ex supremo Apostolatus apice and Vicar-Apostolic John MacDonald was translated to the restored See of Aberdeen as its first bishop.

The Bull made Aberdeen one of the four suffragan sees of the Archdiocese of St. Andrews and Edinburgh, and defined as its territory "the counties of Aberdeen, Kincardine, Banff, Elgin or Moray, Nairn, Ross (except Lewis in the Hebrides), Cromarty, Sutherland, Caithness, the Orkney and Shetland Islands, and that portion of Inverness which lies to the north of a straight line drawn from the most northerly point of Loch Luing to the eastern boundary of the said county of Inverness, where the counties of Aberdeen and Banff join."

== Early twentieth century ==
In 1906 there were nearly 4,000 Catholics out of a population of 800,000. The clergy consisted of 48 secular priests, 24 regular priests, 57 churches, chapels, and stations; and various schools. There was a Benedictine Abbey at Fort Augustus which had been raised to the rank of an abbey, immediately subject to the Holy See, by a brief of Leo XIII on 12 December 1882. Its building was made possible by the financial backing of Lord Lovat.

== Twenty-first century ==
The current bishop of the diocese is the Right Reverend Hugh Gilbert OSB. In area the diocese is 29,068 square kilometres (11,223 sq mi) approximately one fifth of the land mass of Scotland. Proportionately it has the smallest Catholic population of any diocese in the United Kingdom. In 2006 the Catholic population of 20,000 out of a total population of 700,000 (2.9%) was served by 44 priests and 12 deacons in 41 parishes.

== Bishops ==
=== Past and present ordinaries ===
The following is a list of the modern Bishops of Aberdeen and its precursor offices:

Vicars Apostolic of the Highland District

- Alexander John Grant (appointed 16 September 1727 – died 19 September 1727)
- Hugh MacDonald (appointed 12 February 1731 – died 12 March 1773)
- John MacDonald (succeeded 12 March 1773 – died 9 May 1779)
- Alexander MacDonald (appointed 30 September 1779 – died 9 September 1791)
- John Chisholm (appointed 8 November 1791 – died 8 July 1814)
- Aeneas Chisholm (succeeded 8 July 1814 – died 31 July 1818)
- Ranald MacDonald (appointed 27 August 1819 – translated to the Western District 13 February 1827)

Vicars Apostolic of the Northern District

- James Kyle (appointed 13 February 1827 – died 23 February 1869)
- John MacDonald (succeeded 23 February 1869 – became Bishop of Aberdeen 15 March 1878)

Bishops of Aberdeen

- John MacDonald (appointed 15 March 1878 – died 4 February 1889)
- Colin Grant (appointed 16 July 1889 – died 26 September 1889)
- Hugh MacDonald, C.SS.R. (appointed 14 August 1890 – died 29 May 1898)
- Aeneas Chisholm (appointed 7 January 1899 – died 13 January 1918)
- George Henry Bennett (appointed 18 June 1918 – died 25 December 1946)
- John Alexander Matheson (appointed 2 August 1947 – died 5 July 1950)
- Francis Raymond Walsh, M. Afr. (appointed 20 June 1951 – resigned 22 July 1963)
- Michael Foylan (appointed 8 December 1964 – died 28 May 1976)
- Mario Joseph Conti (appointed 28 February 1977 – translated to the Archdiocese of Glasgow 15 January 2002)
- Peter Antony Moran (appointed 13 October 2003 – resigned 4 June 2011)
- Hugh Gilbert OSB (incumbent, appointed 4 June 2011)

=== Coadjutor Vicars Apostolic ===
- Aeneas Chisholm (1804 – 1814)
- John MacDonald (1761 – 1773)
- John MacDonald (1868 – 1869)

=== Other priest of this diocese who became bishop ===
- Robert Fraser, appointed Bishop of Dunkeld in 1913

== See also ==
- Catholic Church in Scotland
- Diocese of Aberdeen
- Bishop of Aberdeen
- Ogilvie Institute
